= A610 road =

Road in England

Coordinates: 53.01168°N 1.31458°W

A610

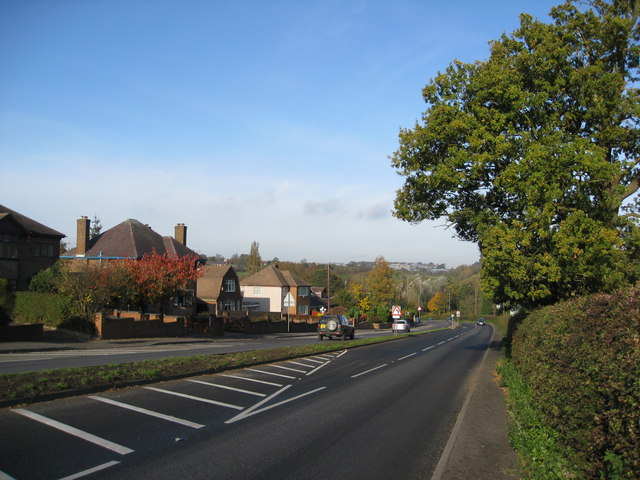
- The A610 at Woodlinkin

Route information
- Length: 17.6 mi (28.3 km)

Major junctions
- From: Nottingham
- A6008; A609; A6200; A6130; A6514; B6004; B6008; A6002; B600; M1; A6096; A608; A6007; A38; A6
- To: Heage and Ambergate

Location
- Country: United Kingdom
- Primary destinations: Kimberley, Nottinghamshire, Eastwood, Nottinghamshire

Road network
- Roads in the United Kingdom; Motorways; A and B road zones

The A610 is an A-road in England, which runs from Nottingham to Ambergate, where it joins the A6.

== Route ==
=== Nottingham to Eastwood ===
The road starts in Nottingham at a junction with Maid Marian Way and Upper Parliament Street (A6008). From here road ascends, passing Nottingham Cathedral. At Canning Circus, it meets the A6200 (former A52) for Derby and A608 for Ilkeston. The A610 becomes Alfreton Road as it passes through Hyson Green, where it meets the A6130 Radford Boulevard and Gregory Boulevard, further on is a KFC and Tesco Express.

At Bobbers Mill it becomes Nuthall Road, near a McDonald's and the Bobbers Mill Transport Cafe, then crossing the Nottingham Ring Road (A6514 or Western Boulevard). The road then passes through Aspley, with the speed limit being enforced by SPECS average speed cameras, with the Esso Nuthall Rd garage next to a Greggs. At a crossroads adjacent to Aspley Library, nearby to the north is Ellis Guilford School. It crosses the B6004 Broxtowe Lane at NCN Basford Hall, with an Iceland slightly further, with a KFC and Tesco Express (Cinderhill Express) with a service station. The B6008 is at the large Cinderhill Roundabout. To the north is the Phoenix park terminus of the NET Line 2 (tram) at Phoenix Business Park or Phoenix Centre, built on the site of Babbington Colliery which closed in 1986, with a large site of E.ON UK and the Premier Inn Nottingham West. At the Cinderhill Roundabout, the road enters Nottinghamshire and Broxtowe.

At this point, the road detours from its original route through Nuthall, the new route (built after the M1 arrived in 1966) becomes a dual carriageway, passing the Millers Barn Nottingham Beefeater on the right opposite the BP St Mary`s Service Station, and Nuthall Pub & Kitchen further on the left; the 0.75-mile £260,000 Nuthall Bypass opened in 1967. The road ascends out of the city of Nottingham towards the large Nuthall Island (also known as Nuthall Roundabout) with the A6002 and B600; this £90,000 half-mile section of dual-carriageway, the Nuthall by-pass (western section), opened on Thursday 25 August 1966 when the £6m M1 section reached Nuthall; construction had begun in April 1964. The former route follows what is now the B600, the former A613 to Alfreton. Shortly afterwards, the route then meets the Nuthall Interchange (junction 26) of the M1 motorway at a large roundabout. On 24 May 1967, Barbara Castle opened the section of the M1 from here to junction 27 at Annesley Woodhouse, built by George Wimpey; it was started in December 1964 and was to be finished by January 1967.

After the M1, the route enters a four mile long stretch of dual carriageway, passing Nuthall, Kimberley, Giltbrook and Eastwood to the north, and Awsworth to the south. The £3.05m Eastwood-Kimberley By-pass opened on 6 July 1974, and followed a former railway line of the Great Northern Railway; the bypass was opened 16 months ahead of schedule. The grade-separated Giltbrook Interchange is with the A6096, for Ilkeston, and the large Giltbrook Retail Park, and IKEA.

=== Eastwood to Ambergate ===
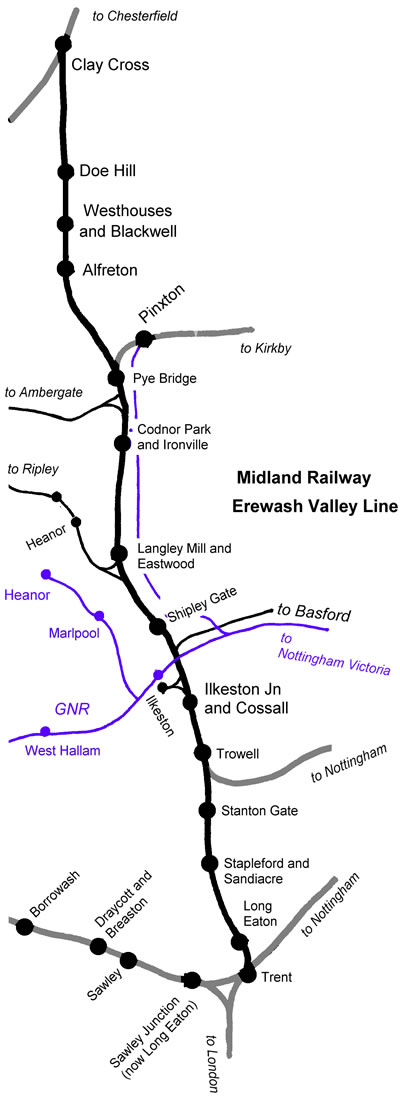
The road partly or fully follows the former Erewash Valley line

The road then reverts to a single carriageway at the Derbyshire border, going underneath the junction with the A608, entering Amber Valley. The road then bypasses Langley Mill to the south, and passes the Panattoni Business Park with a roundabout for access. The A610 then enters Woodlinkin, this particular stretch of the A610 has gained notoriety in the past for road accidents due to the road being particularly windy. The single carriageway Langley Mill By-Pass opened in 1983 with the official ceremony taken place by councillor Joe Carty on 8 September 1983. The road then ascends into Codnor, passing the former Thorn Tree Inn at Woodlinkin.

At Codnor, the route turns right at a T-Junction with the A6007 near the French Horn and is relatively straight for around half a mile with the Kingfisher Fish Bar and a Tesco Express on the left, then descends and turns sharply left. There have been plans since the 1970s for a Codnor Bypass, followed by another section called the Ripley-Codnor Link. The road then ascends for a mile, into Ripley until it reaches a roundabout near the Sainsbury's supermarket, with the B6441. Here, the route goes right at the roundabout, left at another roundabout shortly after, with a possible exit southwards for the proposed Ripley-Codnor link. The bypass heads straight, passing a McDonald's restaurant on the left, and the Derbyshire Constabulary and Derbyshire Fire and Rescue Service headquarters on the right. After the roundabout, the Butterley Park Brewers Fayre and Ripley Premier Inn are on the left. Bypassing Ripley completely, the route reaches the Hartshay Interchange with the A38. The 1.8 km (1.1 mi) Ripley Bypass was built in the early 1980s by Henry Boot Civil Engineering. Nearby to the north, off the B6179, is Midland Railway – Butterley, known for its annual Indietracks festival.

After the A38 junction, the road carries on for a mile, passing through Buckland Hollow and Sawmills, with Bullbridge on the right. The 2.5 km (1.6 mi) Ripley - Buckland Hollow section (West of Ripley) was constructed when the 7.5 miles (12.1 km) A38 (former A61) Ripley and Swanwick Bypass was built, which opened on 21 October 1977. The single-carriageway road has adjacent land for making into a dual carriageway, along a former railway line. The former route passed through Lower Hartshay, to the south. At the exit for the B6013 to the south, there is the Excavator at Buckland Hollow.

Finally, the road straddles the River Amber before meeting the A6 at Ambergate. At Bullbridge (Sawmills), there is an exit to the south for the logistics company Lockwood Group. The road follows adjacent to the Midland Main Line. Coats Viyella Clothing had a main dyeing factory to the north. The road passes under the Midland Main Line at a low (15 ft 3 in [4.65 m]) bridge, after which National Grid plc have one of their Pipelines Maintenance Centres (PMC Ambergate) on the right. A few metres before the A6 T-junction, it passes under the Derwent Valley line next to Ambergate railway station, and the Hurt Arms on the A6.

== See also ==
- A roads in Zone 6 of the Great Britain numbering scheme
