= Listed buildings in Ripley, Derbyshire =

Ripley is a civil parish in the Amber Valley district of Derbyshire, England. The parish contains 62 listed buildings that are recorded in the National Heritage List for England. Of these, five are listed at Grade II*, the middle of the three grades, and the others are at Grade II, the lowest grade. The parish contains the town of Ripley, smaller settlements including Ambergate, Bullbridge, Butterley, Fritchley, Heage, Nether Heage and Waingroves, and the surrounding countryside. The Cromford Canal, now partly closed, runs through the parish, and the listed buildings associated with it are bridges and an embankment. Also running through the parish is a railway that originated as the North Midland Railway with a later branch, the Manchester, Buxton, Matlock and Midland Junction Railway, and associated with these are bridges, viaducts, a goods shed, and the portals of a tunnel. Most of the other listed buildings are houses, cottages and associated structures, farmhouses and farm buildings. The other listed buildings include churches, a windmill, a pair of coke iron furnaces, factory buildings, public houses, mileposts, colliery buildings, a railway station and signal box at Butterley, and a war memorial.

== Key ==
Grade	Criteria
II*	Particularly important buildings of more than special interest
II	Buildings of national importance and special interest

== Buildings ==
Name and location	Photograph	Date	Notes	Grade
Crowtrees Farmhouse; 53.05067°N 1.44302°W	—	15th century	The farmhouse is timber framed with cruck trusses, it was partly encased in stone in the 17th century and in 1712, and has a tile roof with coped gables and plain kneelers. There are two storeys and four bays. The doorway has a quoined surround and an initialled and dated lintel, and the windows are mullioned, one with a hood mould. Inside the farmhouse are three full cruck trusses, a timber partition, and a large inglenook fireplace.	II
Barn south of Heage Hall; 53.05518°N 1.45804°W	—	15th century	A cruck barn, timber framed and encased in stone, with a tile roof. In the west wall is a blocked doorway, and there are square vents in the south gable wall. Inside the bar are two full height crucks.	II
St Luke's Church, Heage; 53.05165°N 1.44990°W		1646–61	The oldest part of the church is now the chancel and a porch, and it incorporates an earlier east window of three stepped lancet windows. The church was extended in 1825–29 at right angles, giving a T-shaped plan. It was restored in 1897–98, and a vestry was added in 1933. The church is built in stone, the earlier part has a stone slate roof, and the roof of the addition is tiled. On the north gable end is an octagonal stone bell turret, and on the south gable wall steps lead up to a doorway over which is a clock face.	II*
Farm dwelling, Gun Lane Farm; 53.05590°N 1.46589°W	—	17th century	A farm building later converted into a house, it is in stone with quoins and a tile roof. There are two storeys and three bays. In the centre is a doorway under a pointed relieving arch flanked by two-light casement windows with chamfered surrounds. In the upper floor are casement windows, the outer windows in recessed surrounds.	II
Heage Hall; 53.05556°N 1.45768°W		17th century	The house, which possibly has earlier origins, was extended in the 19th century. It is in sandstone and has a stone slate roof with chamfered gable copings and plain kneelers. There are two storeys and an L-shaped plan. The west range has three bays. It contains a doorway with a moulded inner edge and a bracketed hood, and the windows are casements in recessed chamfered surrounds. The later bay to the left has a plinth and quoins, and it contains sash windows. The windows in the north range have recessed chamfered surrounds and hood moulds.	II
Padley Hall; 53.05872°N 1.41266°W		Mid 17th century	The house was extended in the later 19th century. It is in stone on a plinth with additions in red brick, quoins, parapets and gables with moulded copings, and a tile roof with ogee ball finials. There are two storeys and attics, and three gabled bays. On the front is a two-storey porch with a segmental arch, parapet and finials, and a doorway with a four-centred arch. The windows are mullioned and transomed with continuous hood moulds.	II*
Old Quaker Meeting House; 53.05531°N 1.46818°W	—	Late 17th century	The former meeting house, later a farm building, is in sandstone with quoins and a tile roof. There are two storeys and two bays. On the front is a doorway and windows, most of which are recessed with chamfered surrounds, one has a mullion, and one is an inserted casement.	II
Buckland Hollow Farmhouse; 53.06215°N 1.44116°W		1690	The farmhouse, which has been altered, is in stone with quoins and a tile roof with overhanging eaves. There are two storeys and attics, and four bays. The central doorway has a chamfered and quoined surround, and there is a later inserted doorway. The windows vary, and include mullioned windows with hood moulds. On the front is a diamond-shaped datestone, and at the rear is a staircase turret.	II
Ridgeway House; 53.05904°N 1.45970°W	—	1720	The house, which was refronted in the 19th century and extended in the 20th century, is in stone and has a coved eaves cornice, and a tile roof with coped gables and plain kneelers. There are two storeys, the original part has three bays, and there is a two-bay extension to the right. The 19th-century front has a plinth and raised quoins, and contains a central semicircular-headed doorway with a moulded arch, impost blocks, a fanlight and a keystone. The windows are sashes with impost blocks. At the rear are quoins, a porch, and a doorway with a dated and initialled lintel. The windows are mullioned with casements, and there is a transomed stair window.	II
4 Gunn Lane, Nether Heage; 53.05391°N 1.46333°W		Early 18th century	A farmhouse in sandstone with quoins and a tile roof. There are two storeys, two bays, a later recessed bay to the south, and a lean-to on the north. Most of the windows are mullioned with two lights, and in the left bay is a 20th-century window.	II
Waingroves Hall; 53.03319°N 1.38752°W	—	Early 18th century	The house, which was refronted in 1800, is in red brick with stone dressings at the front, and in stone in the left gable end and rear. The front has a plinth, quoins, sill bands, a moulded eaves cornice and a blocking course. The roof is tiled and has stone coped gables. There are three storeys, a double depth plan, and a symmetrical front of three bays. In the centre is a porch and a doorway with a moulded inner edge and a fluted keystone. The windows are sashes with wedge lintels and raised keystones. The keystones in the top floor have carved motifs, and over the central window in the middle floor is a plaque with carved coat of arms and a hood mould.	II
Gun Lane Farmhouse and farm buildings 53.05624°N 1.46588°W	—	Mid 18th century	The farm buildings are attached to the rear of the farmhouse and are dated 1873. They are all in stone with quoins, the farmhouse has a tile roof, the other buildings have slate roofs, and all have coped gables, the house with plain kneelers, and the other buildings with finials. The house has a raised eaves band, three storeys, an L-shaped plan, a symmetrical front of three bays, and a rear wing. The central doorway has a moulded architrave, a frieze and a cornice, and the windows are casements. In the left gable wall is a re-used datestone. The farm buildings contain doorways, stable doors, and hayloft openings, and there is a datestone on the north gable.	II
Hartsay Hall; 53.04970°N 1.43619°W	—	Mid 18th century	A farmhouse that was refronted in the 19th century, it is in stone with quoins, a raised eaves band, and a roof of Westmorland slate with coped gables and plain kneelers. There are two storeys and a symmetrical front of three bays. The central doorway has a semicircular head, pilasters, raised impost bands, a fanlight, and a bracketed hood. It is flanked by canted bay windows with a blocking course and moulded cornices, and the other windows on the front are sashes. At the rear is a doorway with a semicircular head, rusticated jambs and a moulded arch, casement windows, and a full height stair window with three transoms.	II
17 Boothgate; 53.03881°N 1.45030°W		Late 18th century	A farmhouse in sandstone with painted stone dressings, quoins and a tile roof. There are two storeys, three bays and flanking wings. In the centre is a gabled porch, a doorway with a quoined surround, and a smaller doorway to the left. The windows are casements.	II
Butterley Hall; 53.05706°N 1.39612°W	—	Late 18th century	A country house, extended in the 19th century, and later part of a police headquarters. It is in pebbledashed red brick with painted stone dressings, quoins, a dentilled cornice, and a slate roof. The original part has two storeys and attics and eight bays, and the extension to the north is lower with two storeys and eight bays. On the garden front s a full height canted stuccoed bay window with a moulded cornice, three doorways with fanlights, and sash windows. In the roof are five 20th-century gabled dormers with alternating triangular and semicircular pediments. At the rear is a porch with Tuscan columns.	II
Codnor Gate Farmhouse; 53.04796°N 1.38080°W		Late 18th century	The farmhouse is in red brick with dressings in brick and stone, a dentilled eaves band, and a tile roof with coped gables on plain kneelers. There are two storeys and attics, three bays, and a lower two-storey single-bay extension on the left. On the front is a doorway and a mix of sash and casement windows, the openings in the main block with segmental heads.	II
Coppice Farmhouse; 53.04170°N 1.39552°W		Late 18th century	The farmhouse is in red brick with dressings in brick and stone, a dentilled eaves band, and a tile roof with coped gables on moulded kneelers. There are two storeys and three bays. In the centre is an inserted doorway, at half landing level is a sliding sash window, and the other windows are casements; all the windows have flat gauged brick heads with stone keystones.	II
Foreclose Farmhouse; 53.04113°N 1.45767°W	—	Late 18th century	The farmhouse is in whitewashed sandstone with a tile roof. There are two storeys and three bays. The central doorway has a quoined surround and a bracketed hood. Above it is a single-light window, and the other windows are mullioned and contain two small-paned casements.	II
Heage Windmill; 53.05308°N 1.45402°W		Late 18th century	A tower windmill that was reconstructed in 1894 and restored in 1972–74. It is in sandstone with a circular plan, tapering to the top, with three storeys. In the ground floor are two doorways, and the windows in all floors are casements. The windmill has an ogee-domed metal cap, six sails, and tail gearing opposite, including a windshaft with a brakewheel.	II*
Hillside Cottage; 53.05612°N 1.47973°W	—	Late 18th century	A sandstone house with quoins, and a tile roof with stone coped gables and moulded kneelers. There are two storeys and three bays. In the left bay is a 20th-century casement window, and the other windows are mullioned with two lights.	II
Windmill House; 53.05267°N 1.45376°W	—	Late 18th century	The house, which was extended in about 1970, is in sandstone with quoins, a coved eaves band and a tile roof. There are two storeys, three bays, and a lower later bay to the east. On the front are two doorways with quoined surrounds and a single-light stair window, and the other windows are mullioned and contain casements.	II
Yew Tree Farmhouse; 53.04849°N 1.43115°W		Late 18th century	The farmhouse is in stone with a tile roof. There are two storeys, three bays, and flanking lower single-bay extensions. In the centre of the main range is a doorway with a plain surround and a bracketed hood. It is flanked by casement windows, above it is a single-light window, and the other windows in the upper floor are mullioned with two lights. The extension to the left has a doorway and a window, and on the right is a lean-to.	II
Furnaces, Morley Park Iron Works; 53.03857°N 1.43467°W		c. 1780	A pair of coke iron furnaces, the older one refurbished in 1818, the later one dating from 1825, used in the production of cast iron. They consist of tall tapering square towers in gritstone, with quoins, and tapering cylindrical interiors lined with fire brick. They are built into the hillside, and each has a pointed arch on the west front, and a small entrance into the kilns at the back with an iron lintel.	II*
Waingroves Cottage; 53.03330°N 1.38789°W	—	1790	A house that was extended in the 19th century, re-using 17th-century material, the front is in red brick, the other walls are in stone, and it has stone dressings and quoins. The original part has a tile roof, and the roof of the extension is slated. There are two storeys, three bays, and an additional bay on the left. On the front is an inserted doorway, most of the windows in the original part are mullioned, and in the extension is a casement window in the ground floor and a sliding sash window above. Also on the front is a diamond-shaped initialled datestone.	II
Farm building behind Waingrove Hall; 53.03356°N 1.38767°W	—	1791	The farm building is in red brick with dressings in brick and stone, a dentilled eaves band, and a tile roof with coped gables. There are two storeys and five bays. On the front is a casement window, four doorways, one with a dated and initialled lintel, square openings and cross vents. In the west gable wall is an upper floor doorway with a flat gauged brick arch and a stone keystone.	II
Canal bridge adjacent to 26 Bullbridge Hill; 53.06728°N 1.46797°W	—	1792	The bridge over the Cromford Canal, closed at this point, is in stone. It consists of a single fluted semicircular arch, with a plain band and parapets with rounded copings. The walls curve outwards and end in square piers.	II
Canal bridge south west of Crich Chase Farmhouse; 53.06387°N 1.48199°W		1792	The bridge carries Chase Road over the Cromford Canal and is in stone. It consists of a single stilted semicircular arch, with a plain band and parapets with chamfered copings. The walls curve outwards and end in square piers.	II
Canal bridge east of Canal Cottages; 53.06438°N 1.48609°W		1792	The bridge over the Cromford Canal is in sandstone. It consists of a single stilted semicircular arch, with a plain band and parapets with rounded copings. The walls curve outwards and end in square piers.	II
Canal tunnel and embankment 53.06252°N 1.44335°W		1792	The tunnel carries the Cromford Canal under the B6013 road. It is in stone with segmental-arched entrances, and is about 30 yards (27 m) long, with a high embankment above it and to the sides. The tunnel has a barrel vault, with round coping on top of the embankment.	II
Half Penny Bridge; 53.05943°N 1.48388°W	—	1792	The bridge carries Holly Lane over the River Derwent. It is in gritstone, and consists of two wide segmental arches. The cutwaters have a triangular section and from them pilasters rise to the parapets. There are plain bands over the arches, and the parapets are coped. The abutment to the west contains five stilted semicircular arches with cutwaters, and at the far west is a segmental arch over a tail race.	II
Starvehimvalley Bridge; 53.05799°N 1.44085°W		1792	The bridge carries a track over a portion of the Cromford Canal. It is in stone and consists of a single stiled semicircular arch with a plain band, and parapets with round copings. The flanking walls curve outwards and end in square piers.	II
Cromford Canal Embankment; 53.06667°N 1.46491°W	—	1793	The canal embankment is in stone, about 100 feet (30 m) long and 40 feet (12 m) wide. The walls have a plain band near the base, and rounded copings. A barrel vaulted tunnel runs through the embankment, and has buttress-like jambs at the entrances.	II
Two pairs of gates and wall, Hartsay Hall; 53.04974°N 1.436°W	—	c. 1793	The eastern gates are the older, and were moved here from elsewhere, the western gates date from the early 20th-century and re-use 18th-century materials. Both gates have square stone piers about 10 feet (3.0 m) high, and between them is a stone wall. The eastern gate piers have banded rustication, rusticated pilasters, moulded bases, dentilled cornices, and banded ball finials, and between them are decorative iron gates. The western gates are plain, and have rusticated pilasters, simple cornices, and re-used banded ball finials.	II
All Saints' Church, Ripley; 53.05123°N 1.40670°W		1820–21	The church was built for the Butterley Company, it was rebuilt in 1861–62 when the chancel was added, and the baptistry was added in 1921. The church is built in gritstone with a slate roof, and consists of a nave, a chancel, a baptistry at the northeast, and a southwest tower. The tower has three stages, stepped angle buttresses, a moulded string course, a south doorway with a pointed arch and a moulded surround, and an angled stair turret on the southwest. In the middle stage are trefoil-headed lancet windows, the top stage contains two-light bell openings, with circular clock faces at the top, and above is a cornice with bellflower decoration, and embattled parapets.	II
18 Malthouse Lane, Nether Heage; 53.05296°N 1.46461°W	—	Early 19th century	A stone farmhouse with quoins, and a slate roof with stone coped gables. There are two storeys, three bays, and a later addition projecting from the left bay. The doorway has wide jambs and impost blocks, and the windows are mullioned, containing 20th-century casements.	II
Building west of gate house, Butterley Company Works; 53.06108°N 1.40283°W		Early 19th century	An office block, later used for other purposes, it is in stone with a projecting eaves band and a hipped Welsh slate roof. There are two storeys and four bays. The front contains doorways in both floors, windows with segmental heads and voussoirs, and flights of iron steps.	II
Entrance building, steps, bollard and pillar, Butterley Company Works; 53.06114°N 1.40269°W		Early 19th century	The building is in sandstone with a projecting eaves course, and a hipped felt roof. There is an octagonal plan, two storeys, and a single bay, and the building contains doorways and windows. Stone steps lead up to the street with railings and a cast iron pillar, and on the top steps are two cast iron bollards with rounded tops.	II
Canal Inn; 53.06769°N 1.46801°W		Early 19th century	The public house is in rendered stone on a plinth, with quoins and a pyramidal tile roof. There are three storeys and two bays. Three steps lead up to a central doorway that has a bracketed hood. The windows in the lower two floors are sashes, in the top floor they are casements, and in the east wall is a partly blocked two-light mullioned window.	II
Milepost adjacent to 8 Derby Road; 53.04836°N 1.40653°W		Early 19th century	The milepost on the west side of Derby Road (B6179 road) is in cast iron. It has a triangular plan, a sloped top and a pointed head plate, and is inscribed with the distances to London, Alfreton, Chesterfield, Derby and Burton upon Trent.	II
Milepost at SK 399 486; 53.03418°N 1.40548°W		Early 19th century	The milepost on the west side of Derby Road (B6179 road) is in cast iron. It has a triangular plan, a sloped top and a pointed head plate, and is inscribed with the distances to London, Alfreton, Chesterfield, Derby and Burton upon Trent.	II
Milepost at entrance to Park Lodge; 53.06930°N 1.46960°W		Early 19th century	The milepost on the east side of Bullbridge Hill is in cast iron. It has a short triangular head with a canted top, set on a plain column with simple capital. The milestone is inscribed with the distances to Nottingham, Ripley, Cromford and Crich.	II
Milepost at SK 369 522; 53.06512°N 1.45010°W		Early 19th century	The milepost on the north side of Ripley Road (A610 road) is in cast iron. It has a short triangular head with a canted top, set on a plain column with simple capital. The milestone is inscribed with the distances to Nottingham, Ripley, Cromford and Crich.	II
Milepost at SK 409 504; 53.04898°N 1.39084°W	—	Early 19th century	The milepost on the northeast side of Nottingham Road (A610 road) is in cast iron. It has a short triangular head with a canted top, set on a plain column with simple capital. The milestone is inscribed with the distances to Nottingham, Lanagley, Ripley and Cromford.	II
The Excavator Public House; 53.06193°N 1.44180°W		Early 19th century	A private house, later a public house, it is stone with a sill band, a stepped eaves band, and a hipped slate roof. There are two storeys, three bays, and a large single-storey extension to the east. In the centre is a timber porch and a doorway with a fanlight, and the windows are sashes. All the openings have raised flat arches with incised and tooled voussoirs.	II
26 and 28 Bullbridge Hill; 53.06739°N 1.46791°W	—	Early to mid 19th century	A pair of sandstone cottages with slate roofs. There are two storeys and basements, and each cottage has a single bays. In the centre is a projecting gabled porch with two doorways, and the windows are casements.	II
Derwent Viaduct; 53.05676°N 1.48282°W		1836–40	The viaduct carries the railway over the valley of the River Derwent, it was built for the North Midland Railway by George Stephenson, and it was widened in 1930–31. It is in gritstone with red brick soffits, and has girders of riveted steel. The viaduct consists of five skewed segmental arches. On the east side are stepped voussoirs returning as quoins on the soffits and have keystones. The arches spring from chamfered impost bands, the piers have a band, and the cutwaters are pointed with a rounded prow. At the top is a projecting moulded cornice, and a parapet with steel railings.	II*
Ripley Road Bridge; 53.06217°N 1.47513°W		1836–40	The bridge was built for the North Midland Railway by George Stephenson, Robert Stephenson and Frederick Swanwick to carry its line over Ripley Road (A610 road) and the River Amber. It is in gritstone with red brick lined soffits, and has girders in steel and wrought iron. The bridge consists of four arches, a skew arch over the road, and three square-set arches over the river. The arches have rusticated voussoirs returning as quoins to the soffit linings, and are flanked by later girders laid on masonry extensions to the earlier bridge piers and abutments.	II
North and south portals, Toadmoor Tunnel; 53.05896°N 1.48066°W		1836–40	The tunnel was built for the North Midland Railway by George Stephenson, Robert Stephenson and Frederick Swanwick, and the portals are in gritstone. The south portal has an elliptical arch with recessed and projecting voussoirs, flanked by piers with punched quoins. Over the arch is moulding and a low parapet. The north portal has a semi-elliptical arch with rusticated voussoirs and a keystone on imposts. The flanking piers are rusticated, above the arch is a moulded string course forming a cornice, and a parapet.	II
Bull Bridge; 53.06567°N 1.46599°W		1837	The bridge carries the railway over Bull Bridge Lane, the bridge and retaining walls built for the North Midland Railway by George Stephenson. It consists of a 20th-century span of steel girders on abutments and with retaining walls, all in gritstone. The abutments are broad piers with quoins, and each has a plinth, a dado and a stepped cornice. The retaining walls run for about 100 metres (330 ft) on both sides to the north and for about 150 metres (490 ft) to the south on the east side.	II
Crich Junction Bridge; 53.06416°N 1.46985°W	—	1837–40	The bridge, which carries the railway over the River Amber, was built for the North Midland Railway by George Stephenson, and was later widened. It is in gritstone and is a skew bridge with two segmental arches. The earlier arch has rusticated voussoirs, returning as quoins to the soffit, abutment quoins, and an impost band. The band carries through to the newer arch, which also has rusticated voussoirs, and ends in projecting piers. Both arches have parapets with steel railings.	II
Bridge No. 43; 53.05851°N 1.48122°W	—	1838–40	The bridge carries Newbridge Road over the railway, and was built for the North Midland Railway by George Stephenson. It is in stone, and consists of a wide segmental arch with voussoirs, jambs with a raised impost band, and a moulded band below later blue brick parapets.	II
Bridge over River Amber at SK 360 524; 53.06649°N 1.46390°W		1838–40	The bridge carries the railway over the River Amber, and was built for the North Midland Railway by George Stephenson. It is in stone, and consists of a single segmental arch with radiating voussoirs on plain impost bands and tapering jambs. The arch is lined with brick, and above it is a moulded cornice and a blocking course.	II
Goods shed, Ambergate Station; 53.06057°N 1.47870°W	—	1838–40	The goods shed, designed by Francis Thompson for the North Midland Railway, is in sandstone, with pilasters, overhanging eaves, and a hipped tile roof. There is a single storey and two bays. On the front are two elliptical-headed arches, the side walls have entrances with quoined surrounds, and in the south front are elliptically-arched windows.	II
6, 7, 8 and 9 Midland Terrace, Ambergate; 53.06074°N 1.47905°W	—	c.1840	A terrace of four stone cottages on plinths, with coved eaves bands and slate roofs. There are two storeys, and most cottages have two bays. The doorways have pilasters, raised imposts, a plain frieze, and a bracketed hood, and the windows are sashes.	II
Tramway bridge 53.06251°N 1.47517°W	—	1840	The bridge carried a tramway over the River Amber. It is in stone with brick dressings, and consists of two wide segmental arches, with copings at the top, but no parapets. There are further arches, buried to the east.	II
Engine House, Brittains Colliery; 53.06162°N 1.38155°W		c.1848	The engine house to the former colliery is in red brick with blue brick dressings and a slate roof with wide eaves. There is a single storey and two bays. The windows have semicircular heads and contain Gothic tracery. In the north gable end is a doorway and a small square opening above.	II
Headstocks and machinery, Brittains Colliery; 53.06181°N 1.38142°W		c.1848	The headstock tower is in red brick with blue brick bands, and has a circular plan and three storeys, the lowest storey wider. On the bottom storey is a projecting entrance, and walls are attached to the rear. In the middle storey are small iron windows, and the top storey has a cornice and a large pulley wheel in a slot. Attached to the wheel are a pair of iron supports at right angles to the tower, which connect with the plinth on which the gearing machinery stands.	II
Railway viaduct 53.06181°N 1.48133°W	—	1849	The viaduct was built by James Allport to carry the line of the Manchester, Buxton, Matlock and Midland Junction Railway over the River Amber. It is in stone, and consists of five tall segmental arches. The arches have radiating voussoirs and wall-like piers with plain impost bands, over which is a moulded cornice and a blocking course.	II
Butterley railway station 53.06322°N 1.40118°W		1852	The railway station, which was restored in about 1980, is in stone on a chamfered plinth, with quoins, a sill band, wide bracketed eaves, and a hipped slate roof. There is a single storey and four bays, the outer bays wider and projecting slightly. The central doorway has moulded jambs and a fanlight. The windows have semicircular heads, moulded quoined surrounds and bracketed sills, those in the outer bays paired with colonnettes between.	II
Wingfield Park Lodge; 53.06229°N 1.44002°W		c.1860	The lodge, designed by George Gilbert Scott, is in limestone with quoins, and a tile roof with steep coped gables, kneelers, crockets and finials. There is a single storey, a roughly cruciform plan, and a gabled porch in the angle with a pointed doorway and a hood mould. The gable end facing the drive has a quatrefoil window and an embattled cornice with gargoyles. Elsewhere, there are ogee-headed lancet windows, and tripartite windows.	II
Signal box 53.06342°N 1.39890°W		1906	The signal box was built for the Midland Railway and moved from Aisgill to its present site in about 1985. It is in timber, the lower storey weatherboarded, and has a hipped Welsh slate roof with over hanging eaves and ridge finials. There are two storeys, the upper storey jettied. Along the front of the upper storey are large twelve-pane sliding sash windows, and in the left return is a doorway.	II
Waingroves War Memorial; 53.04161°N 1.38745°W	—	1921	The war memorial adjacent to Waingroves Methodist Church is in sandstone. It consists of a wheel-headed cross with a Sword of Sacrifice carved in relief on the front. The cross stands on a tapering two-stepped plinth set on a square base. There are inscriptions on the base of the shaft and on the plinth, and on the plinth are also the names of those lost in the two World Wars and in a later conflict.	II
