= Bullbridge Aqueduct =

Aqueduct in Derbyshire, England

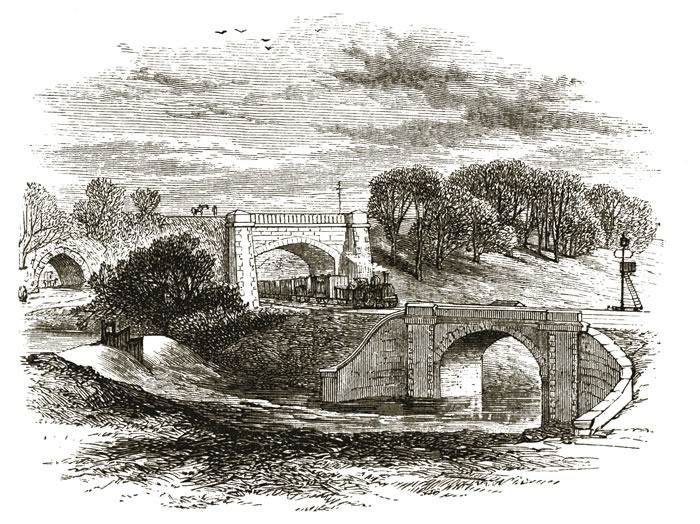
- Bullbridge Aqueduct from the east
- Coordinates: 53.0636°N 1.4716°W
- OS grid reference: SK355519
- Carries: Cromford Canal
- Crosses: Amber Valley
- Locale: Bullbridge

Characteristics
- Total length: 150 feet (46 m)
- Width: 9 feet (2.7 m)
- Height: 6 feet (1.8 m)
- Towpaths: No

History
- Opened: 1840
- Closed: 1968

The Bull Bridge Aqueduct was situated on the Cromford Canal, built in 1794, at Bullbridge east of Ambergate along the Amber Valley, where it turned sharply to cross the valley and the Ambergate to Nottingham road. The Cromford canal is in Derbyshire, England.

Known officially as the "Amber Aqueduct", it was actually an earthwork bank surmounted by masonry walls across the valley some thirty feet high in places. It was pierced by three arches. One was for the river. The second was an accommodation arch for the houses behind, which are now the small village known as Bullbridge. The main road passed through the third which was the original Bull Bridge.

In 1840, George Stephenson engineered the North Midland Railway to intersect the canal at this point on its way from Ambergate to Wingfield and Stretton, towards Clay Cross and Chesterfield. The lines were laid in the space between the river and the road, but were carried on an embankment over the side road leading to Bullbridge village, which itself was carried by a bridge over the river. A Victorian commentator wrote "river, road, railway and canal were thus piled up, four stories high".

To avoid paying compensation to the canal owners, it was necessary to take the railway under the waterway without closing the canal. An iron tank 150 feet (46 m) long, 6 feet (1.8 m) deep and 9 feet (2.7 m) wide was prefabricated in sections at the Butterley Company's ironworks. The sections were assembled on site and floated to the spot, sunk and embedded during the night without interrupting the traffic on the canal.

In 1860 the railway bridge (not visible in the picture) failed as a goods train passed over it, but there were no casualties.

In the early twentieth century the canal went out of use. Where it crossed the highway, the aqueduct was only wide enough for a single line of traffic and was controlled by traffic lights. In 1968 the road became a feeder route for the newly upgraded A38 towards the M1 and the aqueduct was demolished.

== See also ==
- Canals of the United Kingdom
- History of the British canal system
