= Ambergate =

Village in Derbyshire, England

Coordinates: 53.05883°N 1.48205°W

- Village
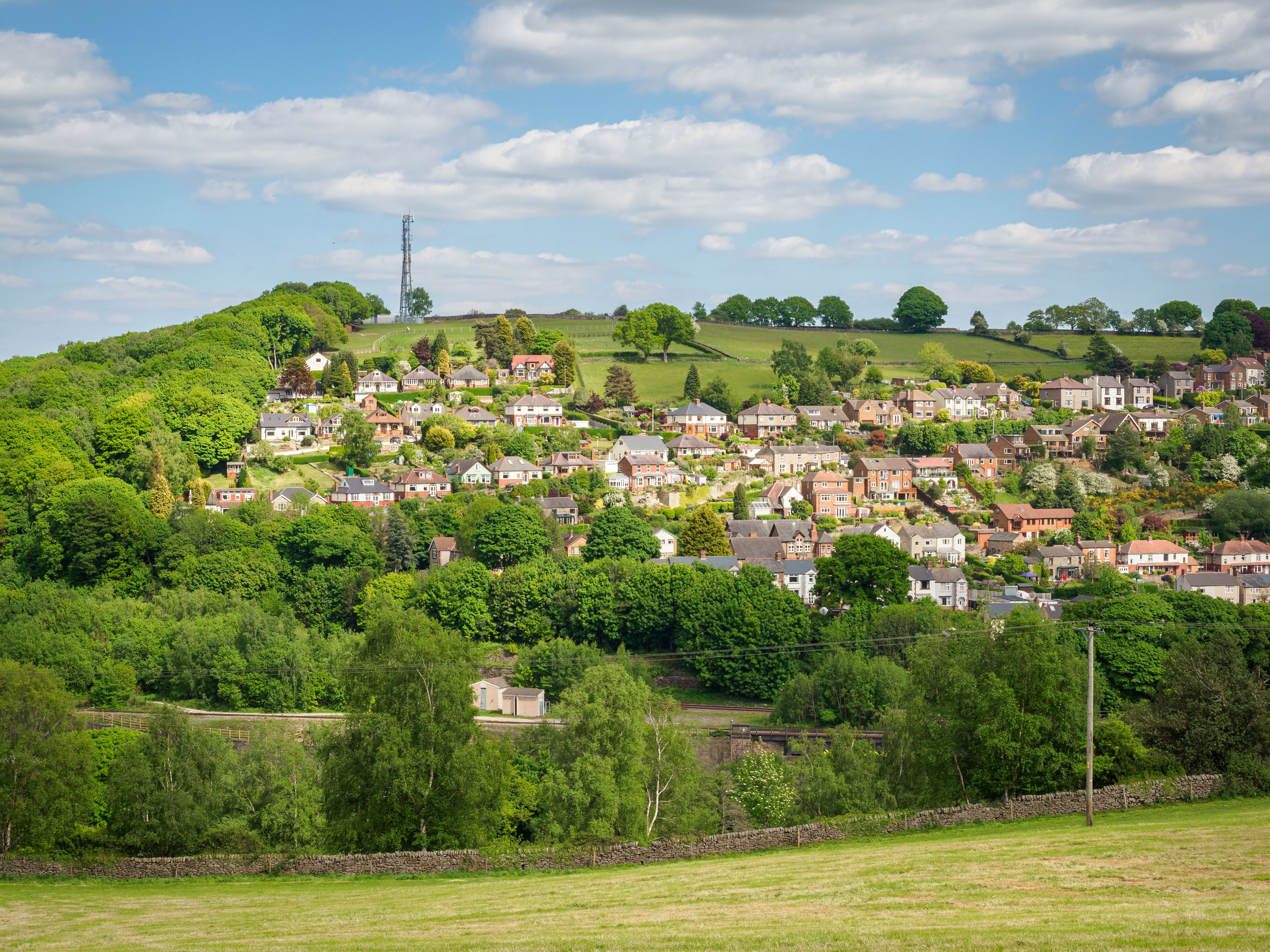
- A view of Ambergate

- Location within Derbyshire
- Population: 5,013 (Heage and Ambergate Ward of Ripley, Derbyshire 2011)
- District: Amber Valley
- Shire county: Derbyshire
- Region: East Midlands
- Country: England
- Sovereign state: United Kingdom
- Post town: BELPER
- Postcode district: DE56
- Dialling code: 01773
- Police: Derbyshire
- Fire: Derbyshire
- Ambulance: East Midlands
- UK Parliament: Amber Valley

Ambergate (/ˈæmbərɡeɪt/) is a village in Derbyshire, England, situated where the River Amber joins the River Derwent. It is about 6 miles (9.7 km) south of Matlock.

The village forms part of the Heage and Ambergate ward of Ripley Town Council with a population of 5,013 at the 2011 Census. Ambergate is within the Derwent Valley Mills UNESCO World Heritage site, and has historical connections with George Stephenson, and is notable for its railway heritage and telephone exchange. The village also hosts an annual carnival.

The A610 road from Ripley and Nottingham joins the A6 trunk road at Ambergate as it runs north to south along the Derwent valley between Matlock and Derby. Neighbouring hamlets are Sawmills and Ridgeway. Alderwasley, Heage (the site of Heage Windmill), Nether Heage and Crich are other significant neighbouring settlements. Shining Cliff woods, Thacker's woods and Crich Chase border the village.

== History ==
=== Name and origins ===
Until the early 19th century it was known as Toadmoor, with no more than a few artisans' cottages. The placename has previously been attributed as deriving from the Derbyshire dialect "t'owd moor" (Old Moor). The origins of Toadmoor have been traced back by the Survey of English Place-Names as meaning "toadpool", the earliest reference being in 1397 and associated references suggesting how the name of "toad mire" was later corrupted to become "toad moor" therefore confusing the landscape feature meanings of "mire" and "moor". As the area is a steep-sided valley bottom with notable floodplains, marsh and bog areas adjacent to the River Derwent the "toadpool" definition is more likely.

The southerly half of the present village is still shown as Toadmoor on Ordnance Survey maps, and the name is retained in the street name Toadmoor Lane and the Toadmoor Tunnel. The name "Amber Gate" was originally applied to the tollgate for the Nottingham turnpike, but was adopted by the North Midland Railway for Ambergate railway station on the Derwent Valley line.

=== Development of industry and transportation ===
In 1791 Benjamin Outram and Samuel Beresford had built kilns at nearby Bullbridge to process limestone from their quarry at Crich. George Stephenson had discovered deposits of coal at Clay Cross and realised that burning lime would provide a use for the slack which otherwise would go to waste. He leased Cliff Quarry at Crich, and built eight limekilns beside the railway. Within a year they had grown to twenty. They were connected by another wagonway known as "The Steep", a 550-yard (500 m) self-acting incline at a slope of 1 in 5.

The turnpike to Matlock was opened in 1818. Until then the main road from Belper northwards had been through Wirksworth and such traffic as there was, would have been mainly cotton from Arkwright's Mill at Cromford. However, the Cromford Canal, opened in 1794, also passes the village. In 1818 the turnpike to Nottingham was opened with a toll house at the junction. The canal towpath can be followed from here to Cromford Wharf, passing High Peak Junction, which is the start of the High Peak Trail). This 6-mile (10 km) section is listed as a Biological Site of Special Scientific Interest (SSSI), and also forms part of the Derwent Valley Heritage Way.

In 1840 the North Midland Railway opened with a station at 'Amber Gate' which brought trade for 'omnibus and posting conveyance' to Matlock, which was becoming a fashionable spa town. By 1867 there was a through line from London St Pancras to Manchester, as well as to Leeds. Ambergate became an important interchange and, in 1876, Francis Hurt built the 'Hurt Arms' to replace the former 'Thatched House Tavern and Posting House' which the Midland Railway had converted into three cottages (now Midland Place). Francis Hurt also built 'Oak Hurst', an 1840s mansion later owned by the railway company. The main railway line runs through the elliptical Toadmoor Tunnel designed by George Stephenson.

By 1851 the tiny hamlet had grown to a population of 206. In 1876 Richard Johnson and Nephew opened the wireworks by the river.

=== 20th century ===
By 1931 the population had reached 901, rising to 1,794 in 1951.

The quarry and the wagonway closed in 1957 but the limeworks carried on until 1965 and the passage of the Clean Air Act. The kilns were demolished the following year to build a storage facility and processing plant for natural gas.

In 1966 the first fully operational electronic telephone exchange in Europe opened in Ambergate. This was also the first small to medium electronic exchange in the world and the first of many TXE2 type exchanges.

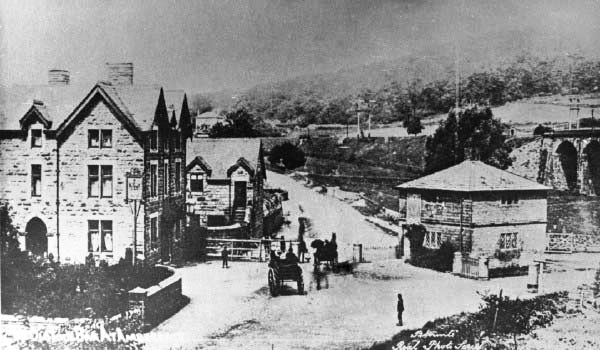
The Hurt Arms in 1880

=== Public houses ===
Ambergate had two pubs: The Hurt Arms Hotel, at the junction of the A6 and A610, and The White House, which is now a private residence.

== Community ==
Ambergate has an active community life, particularly centred on the school, pubs, churches, sports clubs; and annual village carnival which is relatively large and consistent locally, with popular associated events in carnival week and throughout the year. The carnival is organised by a voluntary committee.

== See also ==
- Listed buildings in Ripley, Derbyshire
