= All Saints' Church, Ripley, Derbyshire =

All Saints’ Church, Ripley
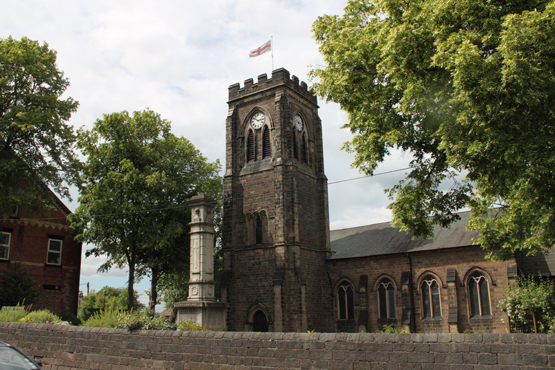
- All Saints’ Church, Ripley
- All Saints’ Church, Ripley
- 53°03′3.27″N 1°24′22.4″W
- Location: Ripley, Derbyshire
- Country: England
- Denomination: Church of England
- Website: allsaintsripley.org.uk

History
- Dedication: All Saints

Architecture
- Heritage designation: Grade II listed
- Groundbreaking: 1820
- Completed: 1821

Administration
- Diocese: Diocese of Derby
- Archdeaconry: Derby
- Deanery: Heanor
- Parish: Ripley

All Saints’ Church, Ripley is a Grade II listed parish church in the Church of England in Ripley, Derbyshire.

== History ==
The church dates from 1821. It was built by the Butterley Company. The baptistry was added in 1921 and it was restored in 1951.

== Organ ==
The church contains an organ by Robert Postill of York dating from 1846. A specification of the organ can be found on the National Pipe Organ Register.

=== Organists ===
- Leslie B. Taylor
- Fred Morley 1927 - 1933 (formerly organist of St Luke's Church, Derby and afterwards organist of St Andrew's Church, Derby)
- Cyril M. Arthur 1933 - ????

== See also ==
- Listed buildings in Ripley, Derbyshire
