= The Elms, Derbyshire =

Housing estate in England

Coordinates: 53.044°N 1.407°W

The Elms is a housing estate built by the town council in the 1950s to provide social housing on the south-western edge of Ripley, Derbyshire, England. It took its name from The Elms farm whose land it was built on. The house, called The Elms, was converted into flats and the farm yard and outbuildings were used as a depot by the council until demolition around the 1970s when sheltered housing was built on the site. The houses on the estate are traditionally built red brick, mainly three and four bedroom with the occasional five bedroom.

== Street names ==
The streets are all named after trees. The estate comprises the following streets:

- Almond Avenue
- Ash Crescent
- Chestnut Avenue
- Cedar Avenue
- Cherry Tree Avenue
- Elms Avenue
- Hawthorne Avenue
- Hazeltree Close
- Holly Avenue
- Larch Avenue
- Laurel Avenue
- Maple Avenue
- Oak Avenue
- Pear Tree Avenue
- Poplar Avenue
- Rowan Avenue
- Sycamore Avenue
- Willow Avenue
- Woodside Avenue
