= Butterley Hall =

Listed building with grounds in Derbyshire

Coordinates: 53°03′28″N 1°23′51″W

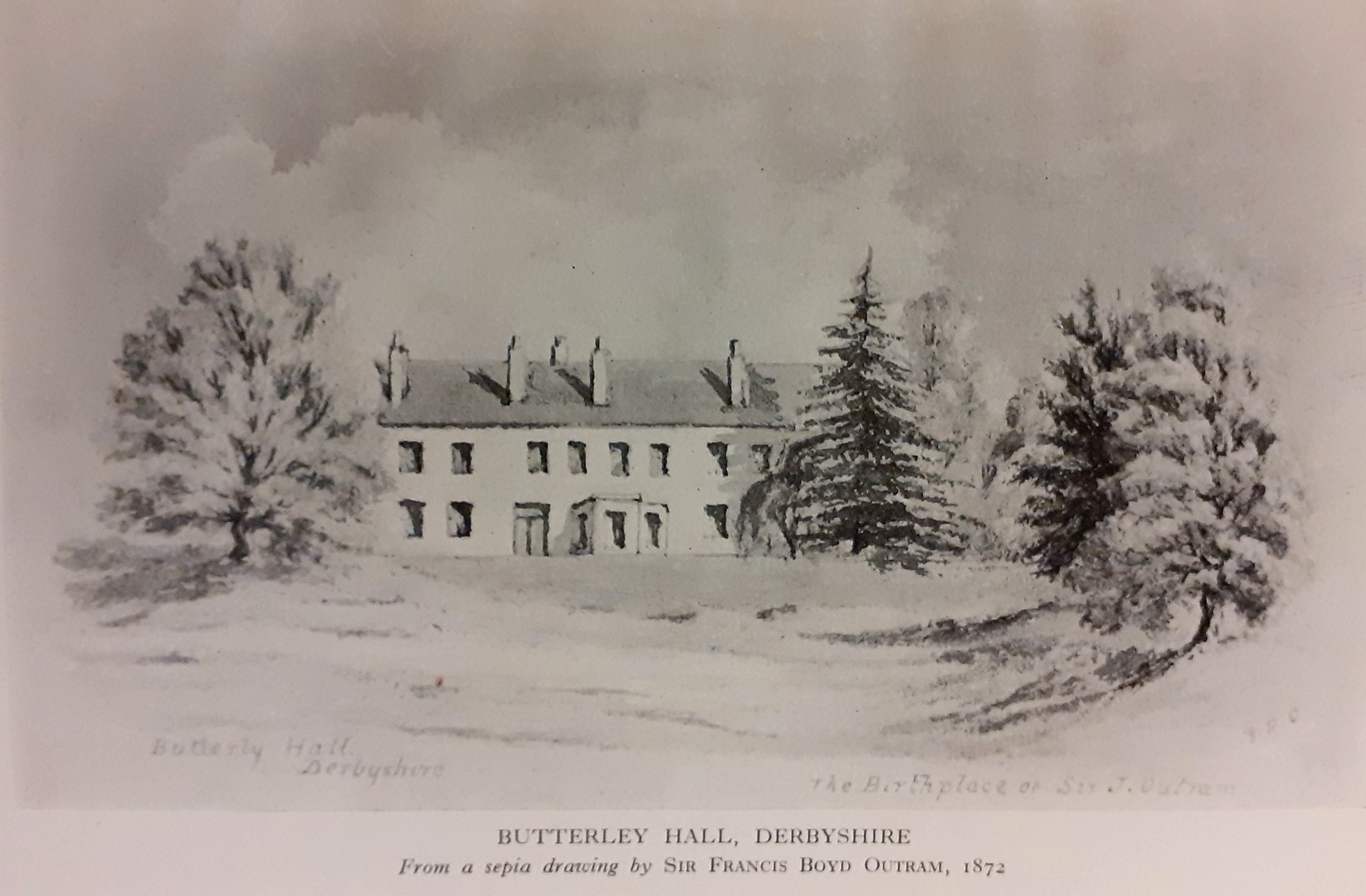
Photograph of a Plate in Mary Frances Outram's book 'Margaret Outram 1778-1863, Mother of the Bayard of India'. The Plate depicts a sepia drawing by her son Francis, 1872.

Butterley Hall is an 18th-century country house near Ripley, Derbyshire. It is a Grade II listed building. The site is now the headquarters of the Derbyshire Constabulary.

The manor of Butterley was owned by Darley Abbey until the Dissolution of the Monasteries in the 16th century.

The two-storey, attic gabled eight-bayed house was built in the late 18th century for the Home family but was sold in 1790 to Francis Beresford for occupation by Benjamin Outram, founder of the Butterley Company. The Hall was the 1803 birthplace of General Sir James Outram of the Indian Army.

Following Benjamin Outram's death in 1805 his business partner William Jessop took residence. His grandson, also William Jessop of Butterley Hall, was High Sheriff of Derbyshire in 1878.

From 1891 until his death in 1938 the hall was occupied by Albert Leslie Wright (1862-1938), eldest son of the Revd Henry Wright, Secretary of the Church Mission society, and his family. Leslie was Chairman and Managing Director of the Butterley Company and held the office of High Sheriff of Derbyshire in 1919. His son by his first wife, Fitzwalter Wright (1902-1957), and grandson John Wright continued to run Butterley until 1968.

The house later became the head office of the Butterley Company before it was acquired by Derbyshire Police.

== See also ==
- Listed buildings in Ripley, Derbyshire
