= History of Methodism in Ripley Derbyshire =

The new Christian denomination of Methodists was formed in the early 18th century as a breakaway movement from the established Church of England. It was mainly formed by two Church of England ministers, John Wesley, the preacher and his brother, hymn-writer Charles Wesley. The Methodist Church has had a following in Ripley, part of the English county of Derbyshire, from the formation of the earliest church up to the present day.

== Wesleyan Methodist Church ==
John Wesley preached in the open-air, travelling all over the country to preach in open spaces or wherever people would listen to him. Although he was sometimes well received, on many occasions he was driven out of towns or villages by those hostile to his measures. The two were soon banned from preaching in the established church, so the Wesleyan Methodist Church was formed. John Wesley first preached in Ripley on Friday 18 June 1742, noting, "I left Sheffield, and after preaching at Ripley, by the way, hastened on to Donnington-Park". Although no specific place is named local tradition places him in the dissenters chapel at the bottom of church street (one north facing stone wall still stands and is part of what was the old co-op food hall now Ice night club).

== Formation of the Primitive Methodist Church ==
A break-away movement from the Wesleyan Methodist Church took place in 1810 when a group of Methodists in the North Staffordshire area held a series called "Love Feasts or Camp Meetings" which did not please the existing Methodist Church. They were expelled and formed the Primitive Methodist Church, which went on to spread throughout the land.

== United Methodist Free Churches ==
In 1849 there was another break-away from the Wesleyan Church, not on account of faith or belief but on individual freedoms of the members. Ripley was a hot spot for this new movement, which became known as Reform Methodist. United Methodist Free Churches were later built in many towns and villages. A group of these people met in a room at the back George Rowland's shop in Church Street (now Godkins) and later in a room in malthouse yard. In the 1850s there was a religious revival in Ripley, and the lecture hall in Wood Street, which had been built in the 1840, was purchased, which lead to the building of a new chapel, called Ebenezer. By 1860 this would not be able to hold all the large numbers attending. A new church also called Ebenezer was then built in Co-Op Square, at a cost of £1,700. The church was able to hold 600 people, and also had a schoolroom.

After a mission in 1864, a church was also built at Green Hillocks, and called Bethel. Ebenezer Church was closed in the early 1960s and is now a car park.

== The Primitive Methodist Church in Ripley ==
Following the creation of the church in 1810, a following had built up in Ripley by the late 1840s. The group met in a room in Malt House. In 1850 the Ripley Primitive Methodist Church became head of a new circuit. This Church was in Grosvenor Road on a site which was formerly the Co-Op Fish and Meat shop and is now a wine Bar. In the 1870s there was a big religious revival under the leadership of the Rev John Thomas Neale. By this time the Church in Grosvenor Road was too small to hold all the people who attended, so in 1876 a group of miners bought new premises in Wood Street, which had reverted to a lecture Hall and ladies school. The cost of the move was £700 and the new premises were called Wood Street Mission Hall. A schoolroom was then built in 1892 at a cost of £1,379 and was known as Primitive Methodist Church, Wood Street. There are still families connected today from the 1876 Pioneers.

The remaining congregations from Grosvenor Road built a new Church on Nottingham Road in 1893 at a cost of £2,075, and included a schoolroom.

== The formation of the Methodist Church ==
In 1932, the Wesleyan Methodist Church, Primitive Methodist Church and the United Methodist Church all joined together and became known simply as the Methodist Church. At this time the membership of the five Methodist Churches was 383. In 1998 the membership was 67 + 200 on the community roll. The Ebenezer Church closed in the early 1960s and members transferred to the Wesley Church. The Wesley and the Bethel Church closed in the late 1960s, with the members transferring to Nottingham Road Church.

In 1989, The Nottingham Road Methodist Church closed and members transferred to Wood Street Methodist Church, as this was now the only Methodist church in Ripley. It was renamed Ripley Methodist Church. The church is still active today, and underwent a complete rebuild in 2009 with a new Church and rooms.

== The rebuilding of Ripley Methodist Church ==
During 2009, Ripley Methodist Church in Wood Street Ripley was demolished and a new Church was built to continue the work of the Church in Ripley.
