= Waingroves =

Village in Derbyshire, England

Coordinates: 53.04°N 1.3868°W

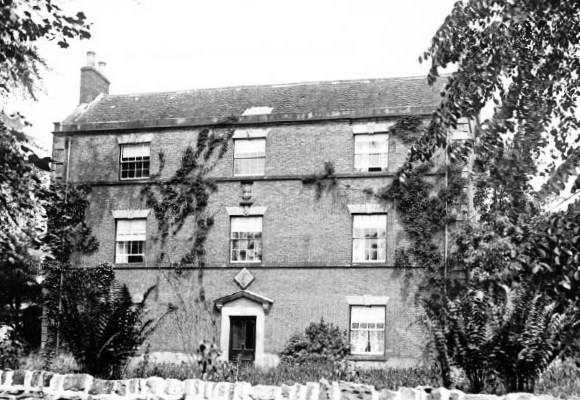
- Waingroves Hall c. 1190

- Location within Derbyshire
- District: Amber Valley
- Shire county: Derbyshire
- Region: East Midlands
- Country: England
- Sovereign state: United Kingdom
- Post town: RIPLEY
- Postcode district: DE5
- Dialling code: 01773
- Police: Derbyshire
- Fire: Derbyshire
- Ambulance: East Midlands
- UK Parliament: Amber Valley

Waingroves is a large village in the Amber Valley district of Derbyshire, England, approximately two miles away from the town of Ripley. It is in the civil parish of Codnor. In woodland to the south of the village, there are remains of a colliery site.

== Waingroves Hall ==
The land at "Waingrif" (Waingroves) was donated by Ralph fitzStephen to the Knights Hospitaller in the early 12th century. The "deed of gift" cites the date 1147, however another document reveals contact between the Abbot of Darley Abbey and the Knights Hospitaller, with regards to Waingroves, as early as 1121.

The land was donated for the foundation of a preceptory of the Knights Hospitaller (a preceptory is a monastic establishment for one of a number of orders of monastic knights), however there is dispute as to whether one was ever constructed. Of those that believe a preceptory did exist, it is accepted that it only had a very short life: founded around 1147 and "supplanted" by another Hospitaller Preceptory in Derbyshire -Yeaveley Preceptory.
Following its acquisition by Yeaveley, a manor was constructed which was leased, along with the preceptory's land, to lay tenants. This, and the small time frame of potential existence, has led some to argue that a preceptory was never constructed at Waingroves, and that the land and the manor constructed by the Hospitallers was for purely secular use.

The land was tenanted throughout Yeaveley Preceptory's ownership: passing into secular hands following the preceptory's dissolution in 1543.

The site of the manor was later used for the construction of what would become known as Waingroves Hall. The present building, now divided into "Waingroves Hall" and "Waingroves Hall Farm".
The Hall does not appear to incorporate any remains of the Manor house of the Knights Hospitaller: the earliest fragments date from 1690, with most of the house dating from 1800 when the house was rebuilt, for Richard Clayton. It was remodelled in the 1790s and was sold in the 1960s for £68,000.

== See also ==
- Listed buildings in Ripley, Derbyshire
