= Street Lane =

Hamlet in Amber Valley, Derbyshire, England

Coordinates: 53.033°N 1.427°W

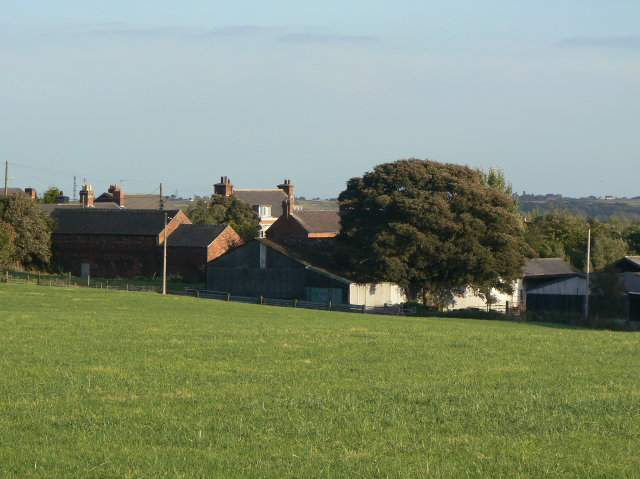
Street Lane Farm

Street Lane is a village in the Amber Valley district of Derbyshire, England.

It is in close proximity to the nearby town of Ripley.

Street Lane is a linear hamlet, dominated by the eponymous road, which roughly descends from the north near Upper Hartshay to the south at Denby.
