= Lower Hartshay =

Village in Derbyshire, England

Coordinates: 53.0578°N 1.4343°W

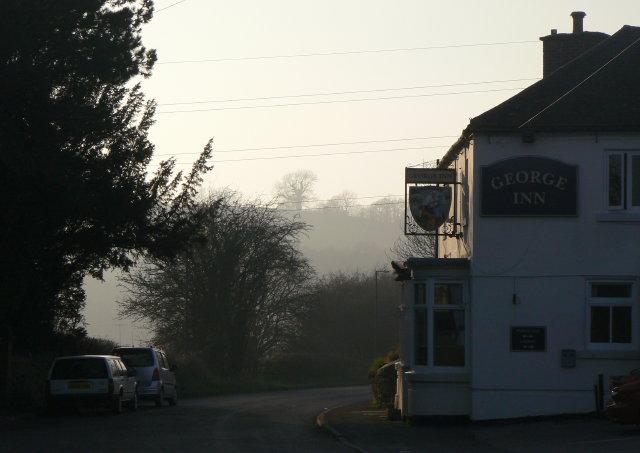
- The George Inn in Lower Hartshay photographed in March 2009

- Location within Derbyshire
- Civil parish: Ripley
- District: Amber Valley
- Shire county: Derbyshire
- Region: East Midlands
- Country: England
- Sovereign state: United Kingdom
- Police: Derbyshire
- Fire: Derbyshire
- Ambulance: East Midlands

Lower Hartshay is a small village in the civil parish of Ripley, in the Amber Valley district, in the county of Derbyshire, England. It is on Hartshay Brook and near the A38 road. The nearest town is Ripley. There is the corresponding hamlet of Upper Hartshay just to the south.
