= Ambergate railway station =

Railway station in Derbyshire, England

Coordinates: 53.061°N 1.481°W

Ambergate
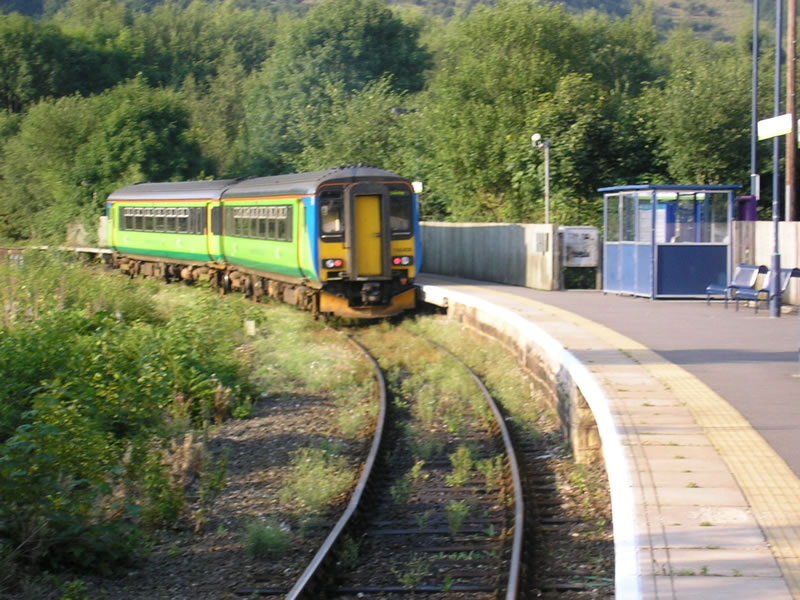
- Ambergate station, seen in 2005

General information
- Location: Ambergate, Borough of Amber Valley; England
- Grid reference: SK348516
- Manager: East Midlands Railway
- Platforms: 1

Other information
- Station code: AMB
- Classification: DfT category F2

Key dates
- 11 May 1840: Station opened as Amber Gate
- 1 October 1846: Station renamed Ambergate
- 1 June 1863: Station moved 400m due south
- 10 December 1876: Station moved 605m due north

Passengers
- 2021/22: ▲27,852
- 2022/23: ▲33,162
- 2023/24: ▲34,922
- 2024/25: ▲39,004
- 2025/26: ▲41,138
Location
Notes
- Passenger statistics from the Office of Rail and Road

Ambergate railway station serves the village of Ambergate in Derbyshire, England. It is located on the Derwent Valley Line, which connects Derby and Matlock; it diverges from the Midland Main Line just south of the station at Ambergate Junction. The station owned by Network Rail and managed by East Midlands Railway.

== History ==
Ambergate station has a complicated history. The original station was built for the North Midland Railway in 1840, between Derby and Leeds. It was an ornate building, designed by Francis Thompson.

From Belper, the line ran along the Derwent Valley, along a stretch called Broadholme with four bridges across the river; it continued through Longlands Tunnel, across the River Derwent and Derby Road with a five-arch viaduct. It then entered Hag Wood Tunnel as turned towards the Amber Valley.

The station building was just north of this tunnel. Shortly afterwards, a proposal was made for an Ambergate, Nottingham, Boston and Eastern Junction Railway which however never materialised, apart from a stretch between Colwick and Grantham.

From Ambergate, towards Chesterfield, the next difficulty for the North Midland Railway was the intersection with the Cromford Canal, where the line intersected with the Bullbridge Aqueduct, before it carried on through a station at Wingfield to Stretton.

However, in 1849, the branch from Ambergate to Rowsley was built by the proposed Manchester, Buxton, Matlock and Midland Junction Railway, with a west to north connection between the lines at the original Ambergate Junction. When a south to west connection was made, for trains from Derby to Rowsley, the station building was rebuilt in 1863 adjacent to the new Ambergate South junction. The original bridge was also widened at its northern end to accommodate the new junction.

In 1867, the Rowsley line had reached New Mills, which meant that the Midland Railway could operate from London to Manchester and Liverpool.

In 1875, Ambergate to Pye Bridge Line was opened from Crich Junction, near Bullbridge, which ran through Butterley to Pye Bridge, near Ironville on the Erewash Valley Line. Much of its business was coal traffic from Nottinghamshire to Manchester and Liverpool, avoiding Derby.

=== The triangular station ===
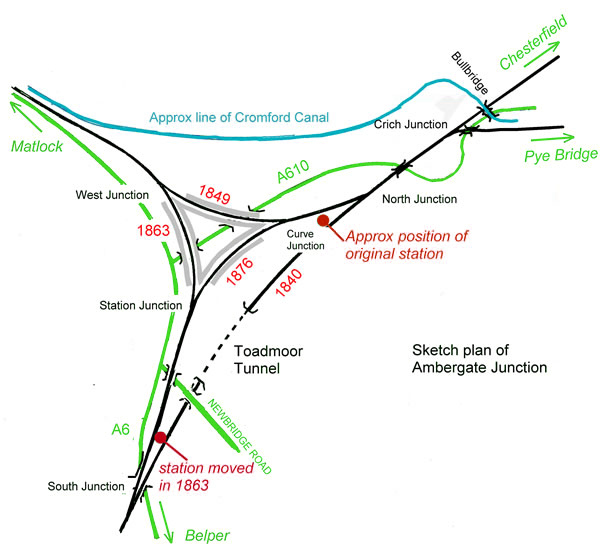
The complex network of road and rail around Ambergate Junction. Note how Newbridge Road passes under the branch where it leaves the A6 then climbs steeply to pass over the adjacent main line

In 1876, a loop was built passing the west side of Hag Wood Tunnel, as a diversion from the original line to a third platform, which allowed for Derby to Sheffield stopping trains. The station was completely rebuilt, with the old building remaining in use as a plans store. This third and final station was the famous triangular one, making it one of the four triangular stations in the UK. The other triangular railways stations are Earlestown station in Merseyside, Shipley station in West Yorkshire and Queensbury station also in West Yorkshire, which closed to passengers in 1955.

On Monday 20 March 1899, a fire broke out on the down platform which destroyed 30 yards of platform, together with the booking hall, stationmaster’s office and waiting rooms. The fire brigade from Belper were summoned, as well as the Midland Railway company brigade from Derby.

Throughout the late 19th and early 20th centuries, Ambergate was an important railway interchange with 28,207 tickets sold in 1872, rising to 90,157 by 1922.

In 1931, the line across Broadholme approaching from the south was upgraded to four tracks. Longlands Tunnel was opened up to form a wide cutting and the junction with the Manchester line was moved south of the river. A new modern steel bridge for the Manchester line was built alongside the original viaduct over the River Derwent and the A6 main road.

The line through Matlock, then the 'main line', carried express trains between London St. Pancras and Manchester London Road, such as the Palatine and the Peaks. It also carried coal trains from Nottinghamshire, for a while with Garratt locomotives, which would be split at Rowsley for the long climb to Peak Forest.

=== Grouping and Nationalisation ===
Having gathered in the Midland Railway, the lines through the station became part of the London, Midland and Scottish Railway during the Grouping of 1923. The station then passed on to the London Midland Region of British Railways on nationalisation in 1948.

On 5 April 1950, there was another fire at the station which destroyed a waiting room on platform 1 which carried the up line to Manchester. Two painters were working on the waiting room at the time.

When sectorisation was introduced in the 1980s, the station was served by Regional Railways until the privatisation of British Rail in 1997.

=== Decline ===
The stopping service on the former North Midland route to Chesterfield and Sheffield (using the eastern platforms on the slow lines) was withdrawn in January 1967, when the other local stations on this section were closed. Most of the trackwork on the Derwent Valley line was lifted in 1968, soon after the closure of line from Rowsley to Buxton and Manchester, whilst the line eastwards from Crich Junction to Butterley and Pye Bridge closed completely in December that year; the station buildings were removed in 1970. Although the triangular station site remained for a number of years, the eastern road bridge over the A610 was finally removed in the late 1980s.

All that is left now is one platform on a single track to Matlock; the original main Derby to Sheffield line passes to the east through Hag Wood (Toadmoor) Tunnel and onwards to Clay Cross and Chesterfield. The original listing of Ambergate station for closure under the Beeching Axe led to its mention in the song "Slow Train" by Flanders and Swann.

== Facilities ==
The station is unstaffed, although there is a self-service ticket machine for fare purchases, a shelter and help point on the platform.

There is a car park at the entrance to the station, as well as a small bicycle storage facility. Step-free access is available to the platform at Ambergate.

== Services ==
All services at Ambergate are operated by East Midlands Railway, using Class 170 diesel multiple units.

The typical off-peak service is one train per hour in each direction to and from Matlock and Lincoln, via Derby, Nottingham and Newark Castle with one train every two hours extending to Cleethorpes.On Sundays, the station is served by hourly.

Preceding station	National Rail	Following station
Belper	East Midlands Railway Derwent Valley Line	Whatstandwell
	Historical railways	
Belper Line and station open	Midland Railway Derby to Leeds Line	Wingfield Line open, station closed
	Disused railways	
Terminus	Midland Railway Ambergate to Pye Bridge Line	Butterley Line closed, station open
