= Ripley, Derbyshire =

Town and civil parish in Derbyshire, England

Coordinates: 53.051°N 1.407°W

Ripley
- Town and civil parish
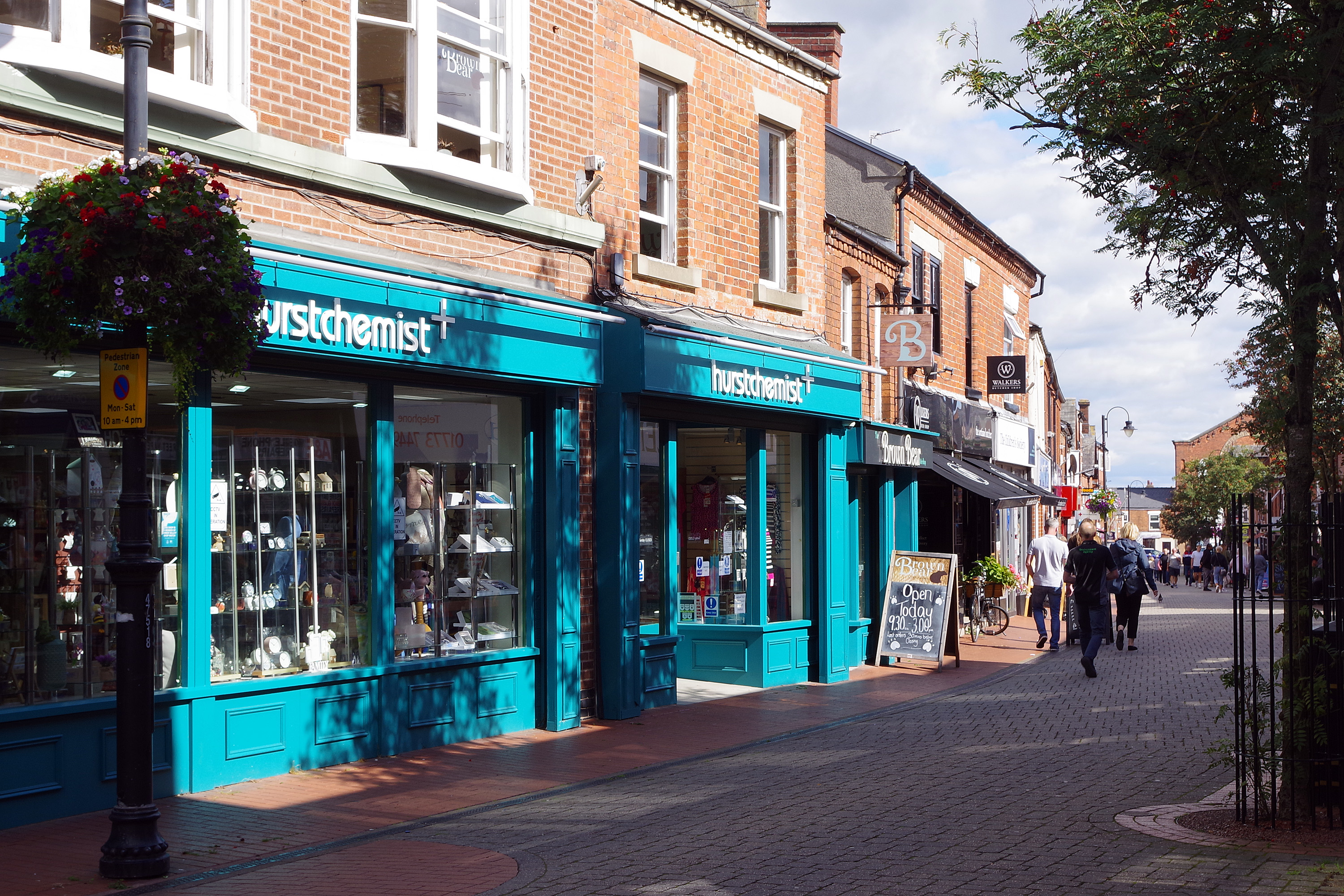
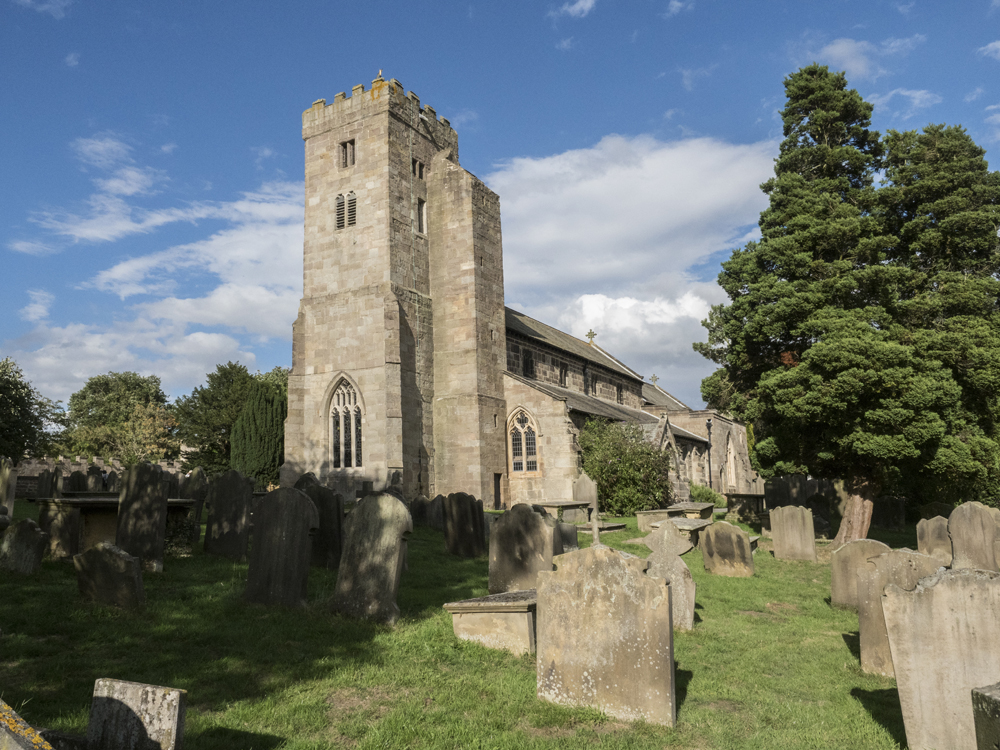
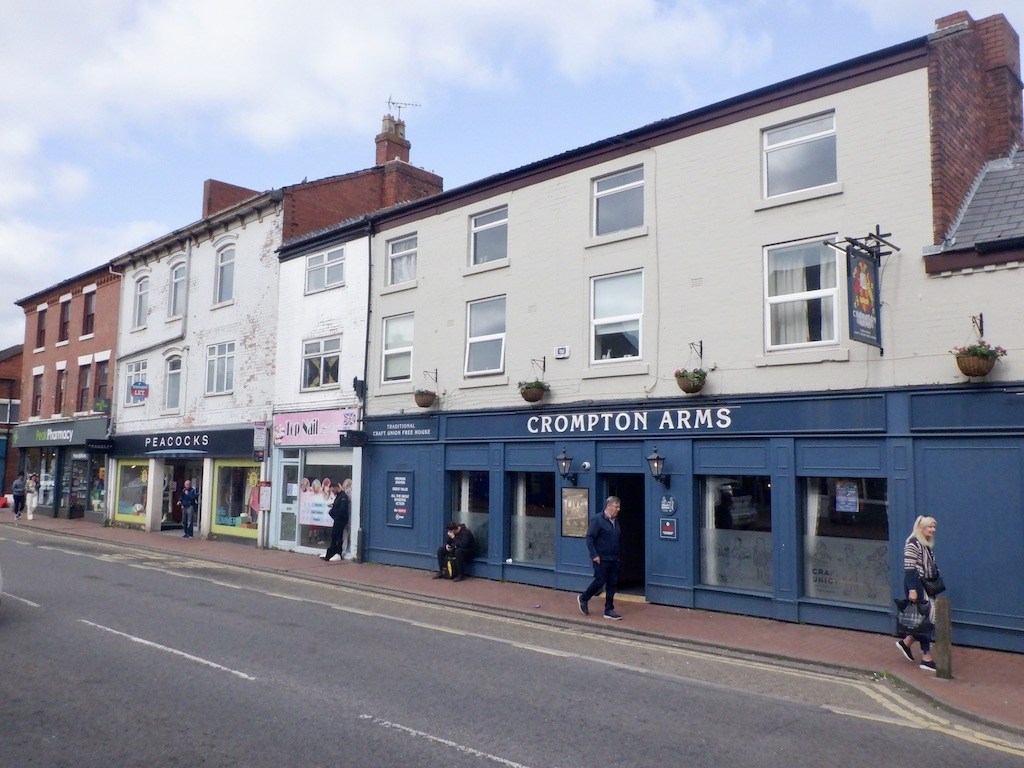
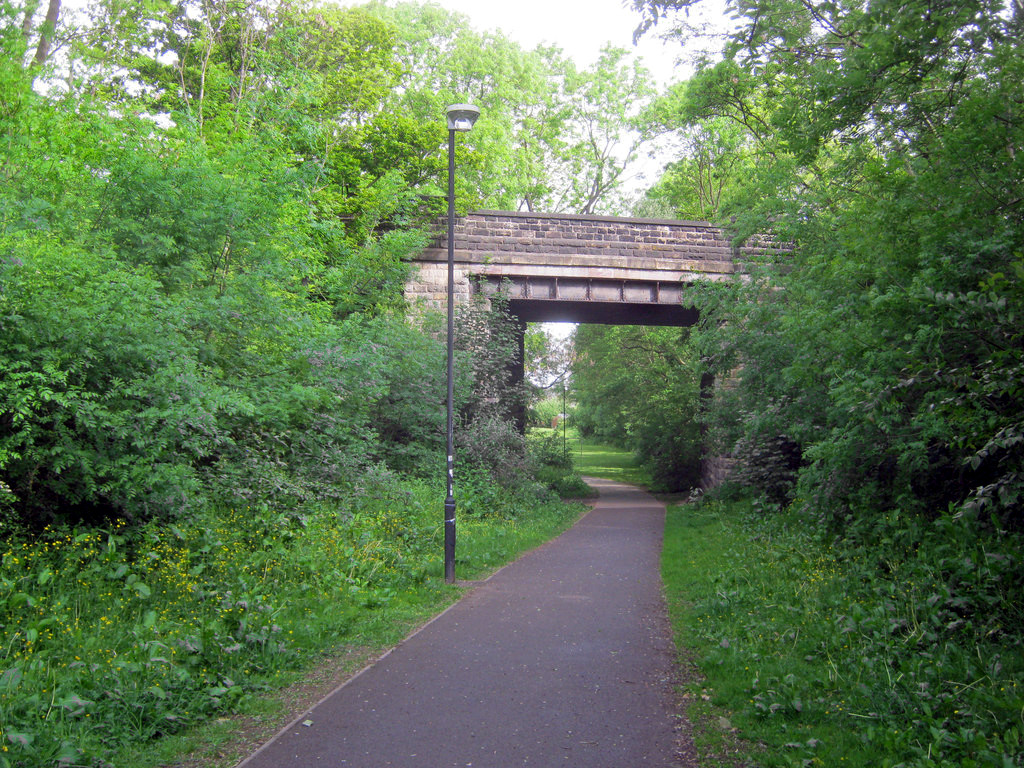
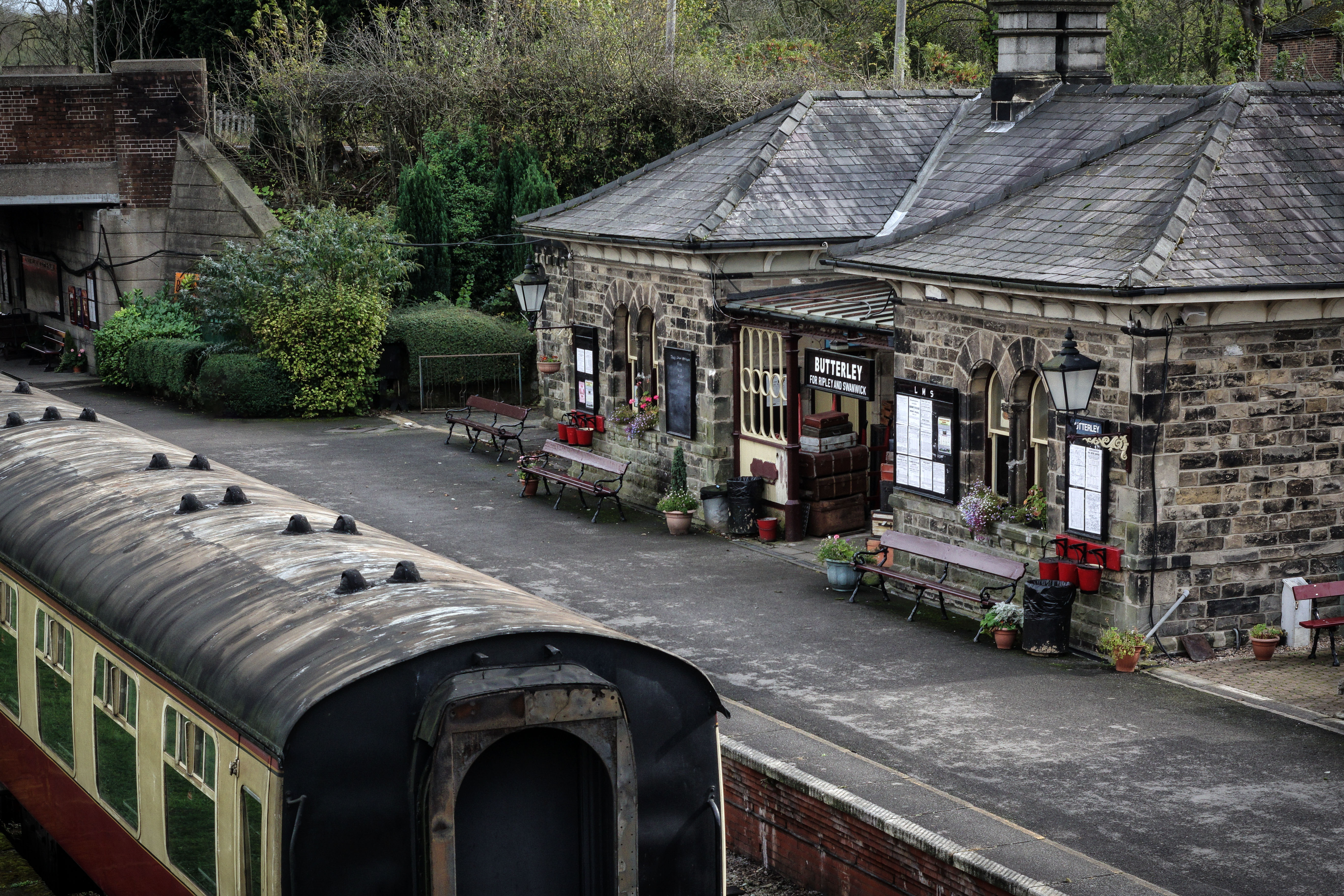
- Oxford Street All Saints' Church High Street Greenway Midland Railway

- Location within Derbyshire
- Interactive map of Ripley
- Area: 8.43 sq mi (21.8 km^{2})
- Population: 20,633 (2021 census)
  - Density: 2,448/sq mi (945/km^{2})
- OS grid reference: SK 39746 50502
  - London: 120 mi (190 km) SSE
- District: Amber Valley
- Shire county: Derbyshire
- Region: East Midlands
- Country: England
- Sovereign state: United Kingdom
- Areas of the town: List: Civil parish: Ripley; Ambergate; Boothgate; Buckland Hollow; Bullbridge; Butterley; Hammersmith; Heage; Ladygrove; Lower Hartshay; Marehay; Morley Park; Nether Heage; Peasehill; Ridgeway; Sawmills; Street Lane; The Elms; Toadmoor; Upper Hartshay; Waingroves; External suburbs: Codnor; Cross Hill
- Post town: RIPLEY
- Postcode district: DE5
- Dialling code: 01773
- Police: Derbyshire
- Fire: Derbyshire
- Ambulance: East Midlands
- UK Parliament: Amber Valley
- Website: ripleytowncouncil.gov.uk

Ripley is a market town and civil parish in the Amber Valley district of Derbyshire, England. It lies north-east of Derby, north-west of Heanor, south-west of Alfreton and north-east of Belper. The town is contiguous with Heanor, Eastwood and Ilkeston, as part of the wider Nottingham Urban Area.

== History ==
The name Ripley derives from either the Old English ripellēah meaning 'wood or clearing on a strip of land' or hrypelēah meaning the 'wood or clearing of the Hrype', an old tribe.

Little information remains as to when Ripley was founded, but it appears in the 1086 Domesday Book, when it was held by a man called Levenot. In 1251, Henry III granted a charter for "one market one day a week, on Wednesday, at [the] manor of Ryppeleg: and one fair each year lasting three days, on the Vigil Day and Morrow of St Helen." Ripley Fair antedates the Nottingham Goose Fair. The market day was later altered to Saturdays, with an extra market on Fridays. Medieval Ripley was just a few stone cottages and farms around a village green, with a few dwellings further afield. Corn was ground at a mill owned by the Abbot of Darley. In 1291, Ripley had "two water-mills with fish ponds".

The Ripley area has been industrialised since the late 18th century. One of the earliest firms to take advantage of local mineral resources was the Butterley Company; it was formed in 1790 by Benjamin Outram and Francis Beresford, and Jessop and Wright joined as partners in 1791. Outram and Jessop were pioneering engineers, best known for their input into the railway industry and their engineering of the Cromford Canal. Outram developed the L-shaped flange rail and Jessop engineered the cast iron fish belly rail; the Little Eaton Gangway project was one of the engineering feats they completed. The engineering part of the company closed and the site of the Butterley Company was demolished in 2010; the company was latterly separated into three parts: Butterley Engineering, Butterley Brick and Butterley Aggregates. Over the last 200 years, these have specialised in steelworks, coal mining, quarrying, railway, foundry and brickworks. One of the best-known examples of the company's work is the arched roof of St Pancras railway station in London, restored as an international terminal. Post-2000 Butterley achievements were the design and construction of the Falkirk Wheel, a canal boat-lift funded by the Millennium Commission and the Spinnaker Tower, in Portsmouth Harbour, as the focus of its regeneration.

Ripley was also a mining community, with collieries owned by the Butterley Company until the Coal Industry Nationalisation Act 1946. These included Ripley colliery (1863–1948), Brittain colliery (1918–1946), Ormonde 1908–1970, and other pits at Upper and Lower Hartshay, Whiteley, Waingroves, Bailey Brook, Exhibition, Loscoe, New Langley and Denby Hall.

== Governance ==
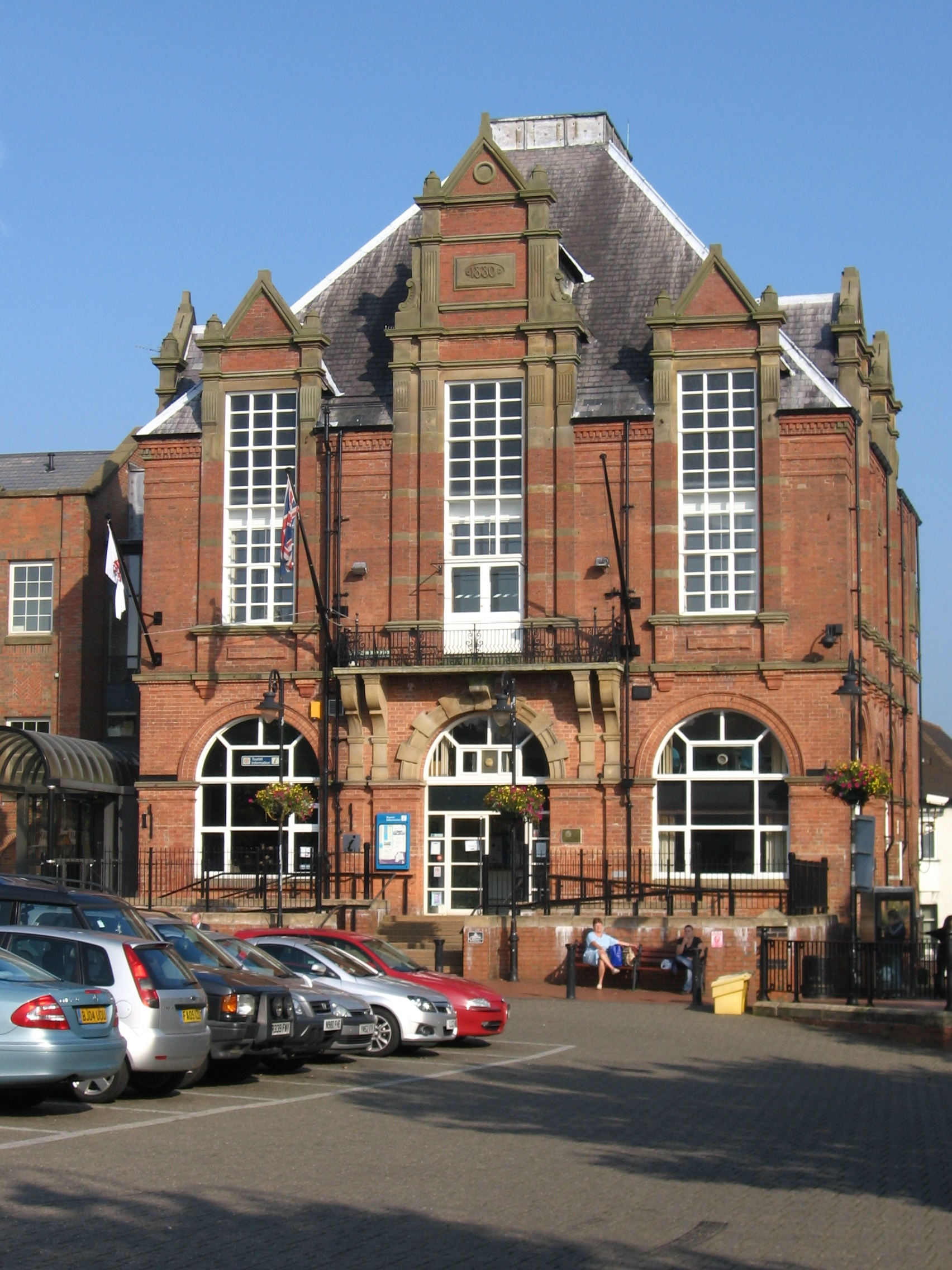
Ripley Town Hall

The building that is now Ripley Town Hall, on the north side of the Market Place, was erected in 1880 as a market hall; the architect was George Eyre of Codnor. It occupied the site of a much older dwelling known as The White House. The Market Hall was originally open on the ground floor. In 1907, it was converted into a town hall by the Ripley Urban District Council. In the 1990s, the building was much extended to the west and remodelled by Amber Valley Borough Council to form its headquarters. In 2012, the Council proposed to sell off some of the buildings under a rationalisation scheme.

Coat of arms of Ripley Town Council

Notes
Granted to the urban district council on 8 April 1954.
Crest
On a Wreath of the Colours out of a Mural Crown Sable Flames proper issuant therefrom a Unicorn's Head Argent armed and crined Or charged with three Spearheads erect one and two Gules.
Escutcheon
Vert on a Chevron Or between in chief two Stags' Heads caboshed and in base a Fleur de Lys Argent a Chevronel Sable surmounted by a Tudor Rose barbed and seeded proper all within a Bordure also Argent thereon six Horseshoes also Sable.
Motto
Ingenium Industria Alitur (Skill Is Fostered By Diligence)

== Demography ==
At the 2021 census, the population of Ripley civil parish was 20,633. The Office for National Statistics also defines the Ripley Built-up Area, which had a population of 20,180.

The ethnic makeup of the town was recorded at 98% White British out of 19,703 residents, followed by Mixed Race at 1% out of 231 residents and 1% Asian out of 135 residents. The other ethnic groups made up less than 1% of the local population. In terms of religious makeup, Ripley's residents were recorded to be mostly non-religious at 51% of the local population at 9,696 residents followed by 48% of the towns residents identifying as Christian out of 9.044 residents. Other religions practiced in Ripley include Other religion (121 residents), Islam (57 residents) and Buddhism (57 residents).

The town has a high ratio of women compared to men at 51%:49% respectively.

== Education ==
=== Pre-schools ===
- Ripley Nursery School, Sandham Lane
- Clowns Day Nursery, Cromford Road
- Clowns Day Nursery, Butterley Park, A610
- Alphabet Childminders, Ripley.

=== Primary schools ===
- Ripley Junior School, Poplar Avenue
- St Johns C of E Primary School, Dannah Street
- Lons Infant School, Tavistock Avenue
- Waingroves Primary School, Waingroves Road
- Codnor Community Primary School, Whitegates.

=== Secondary schools ===
- The Ripley Academy, Peasehill Road
- Swanwick Hall School, Swanwick Hill, Swanwick
- John Flamsteed School, Derby Road, Denby.

== Religion ==
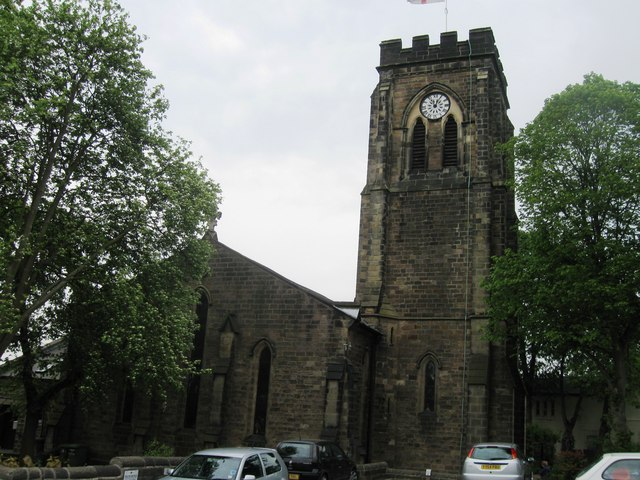
All Saints Church

The Methodist Church in Wood Street is reputed to be the oldest church in the town that is still active. At the peak of the movement, there were five Methodist churches in Ripley, but the congregations have combined over the years. The church was rebuilt on the same site and reopened in November 2009.

An outcome of the nearby Pentridge (or Pentrich) Rising of 1817 was for the Vicar of Pentrich Church to call for an Anglican church to be built in Ripley as soon as possible. All Saints' Church was erected in 1821 by the Butterley Company.

Other places of worship include the Salvation Army hall in Heath Road (which was opened in 1911), the Springs of the Living Water housed in the former St John's Church in Derby Road, the Spiritual Church in Argyll Road, and Marehay Methodist Chapel in Warmwells Lane, Marehay.

== Transport ==
Bus services in Ripley are operated by Trent Barton, High Peak Buses and Notts + Derby. Routes connect the town with Alfreton, Derby, Mansfield and Nottingham.

Running under the premises of the Butterley Company is the 2,966-yard (2,712 m) Butterley Tunnel, on the Cromford Canal. The central section of the canal is disused, but a charitable fund has been formed to reopen it.

Ripley is the site of Midland Railway – Butterley (formerly the Midland Railway Centre), a trust dedicated to preserving railway locomotives, multiple units, rolling stock and items related to the Midland Railway.

The town was served by Ripley railway station between 1890 and 1951; it was a stop on two lines:

- the Midland Railway Ripley Branch from Butterley to Little Eaton Junction, north of Derby
- the terminus of a line from Heanor Junction on the Erewash Valley Line, near Langley Mill.

It was the northern terminus of the Nottinghamshire and Derbyshire Tramways Company and later of the Nottinghamshire and Derbyshire trolleybus system.

== Media ==
Local news and television programmes are provided by BBC East Midlands and ITV Central; signals are received from the Waltham TV transmitter.

Ripley's local radio stations are BBC Radio Derby on 104.5 FM, Smooth East Midlands on 101.4 FM, Capital East Midlands on 102.8 FM and Greatest Hits Radio Midlands on 106 FM. Amber Sound FM, a community station which is based in the Unicorn Business Park, broadcasts on 107.2FM in the Amber Valley,

Local newspapers are the Ripley & Heanor News and Derbyshire Times.

== Parks and natural features ==
Butterley Reservoir, at the bottom of Butterley Hill in the north of the town, has pairs of great crested grebe, coot, moorhens and other birds to watch; there are platforms for anglers to use. There is a footpath that takes in the scenery, with the Midland Railway - Butterley in the background.

Wildlife and a small woodland area can be enjoyed at Carr Wood, signposted from halfway down Butterley Hill.

At the bottom of Moseley Street, next to the Red Lion pub in the town centre, is a recreation area named after Sir Barnes Wallis. It offers views over to Crich Stand, the Sherwood Foresters Memorial; it was built by Francis Hurt in 1778 and was dedicated in 1922 to the fallen of the Sherwood Foresters Regiment (colloquially known as the Woofers) in World War I. It is now the memorial for those in the regiment who died in all conflicts.

The Pit Top is an open area with some seating and a white arch sculpture. The grassed area is the site of the original Ripley Colliery, owned by Butterley Company and was worked from 1863 until 1948.

Crossley Park is a few acres of grassed land opened in 1935. It is surrounded by shrubs and trees on a tract given to the town by James Crossley in 1901. It has a children's play area with a paddling pool, a paved perimeter walk and a bandstand, which is used occasionally on late Sunday afternoons in the summer.

== Community and facilities ==
The headquarters of Derbyshire Constabulary is on the outskirts of Ripley, at Butterley Hall.

Ripley has a community hospital, with a minor accident and emergency department that opened on 7 September 1912. It was built after the death of a miner injured at Pentrich Colliery, who did not survive the road journey to Derby in time for treatment. The Ripley Hospital League of Friends has been an active fundraising group for the hospital throughout its history.

The town has a Scout group founded in 1914. For younger children, it has two Beaver colonies and a Cub pack.

The Ripley Music Festival has been held in the town since 2001.

== Twin towns ==
Ripley is twinned with the French towns of:

- Château-Renault
- Lons-le-Saunier.

== Notable residents ==
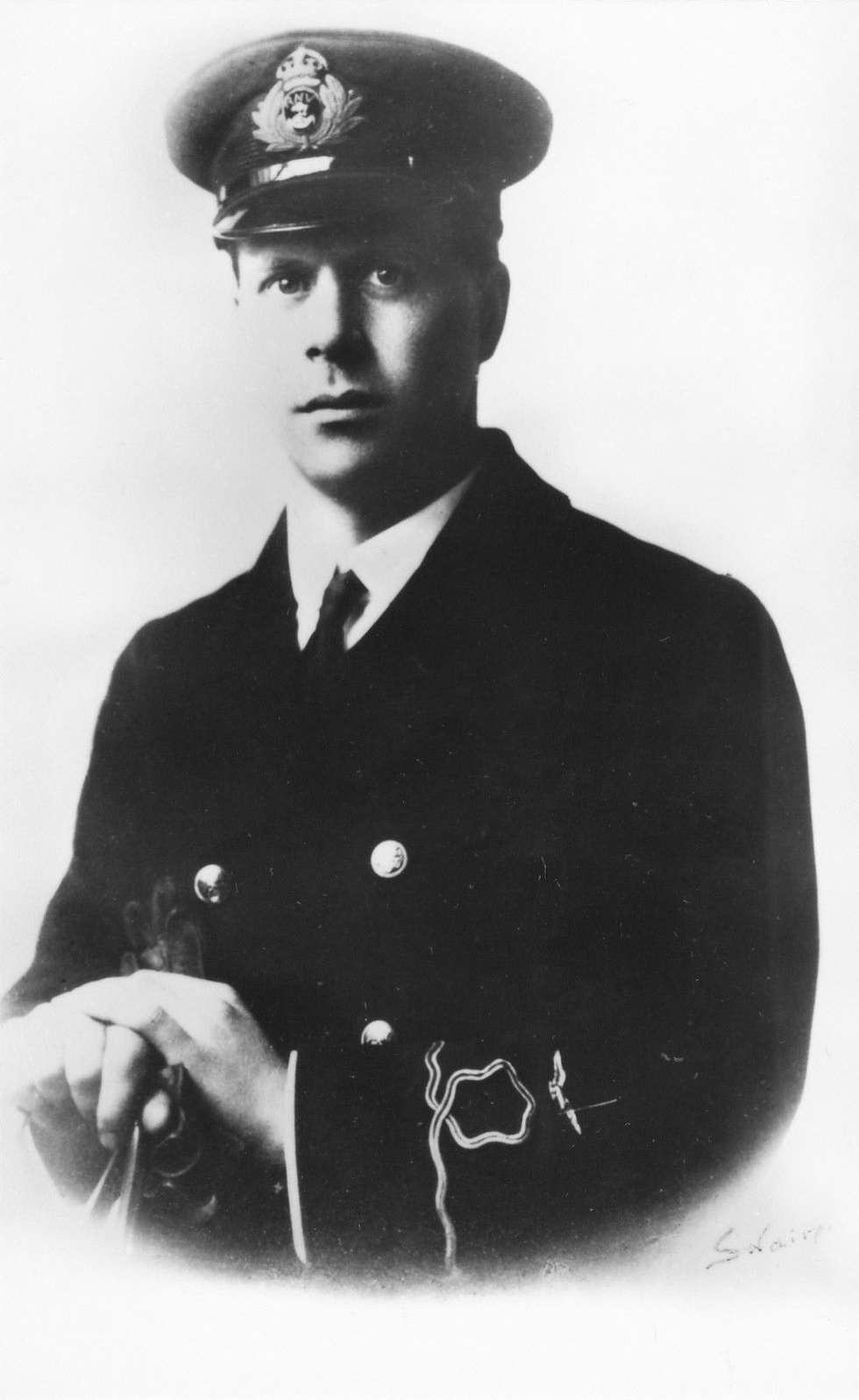
Barnes Wallis, ca 1914

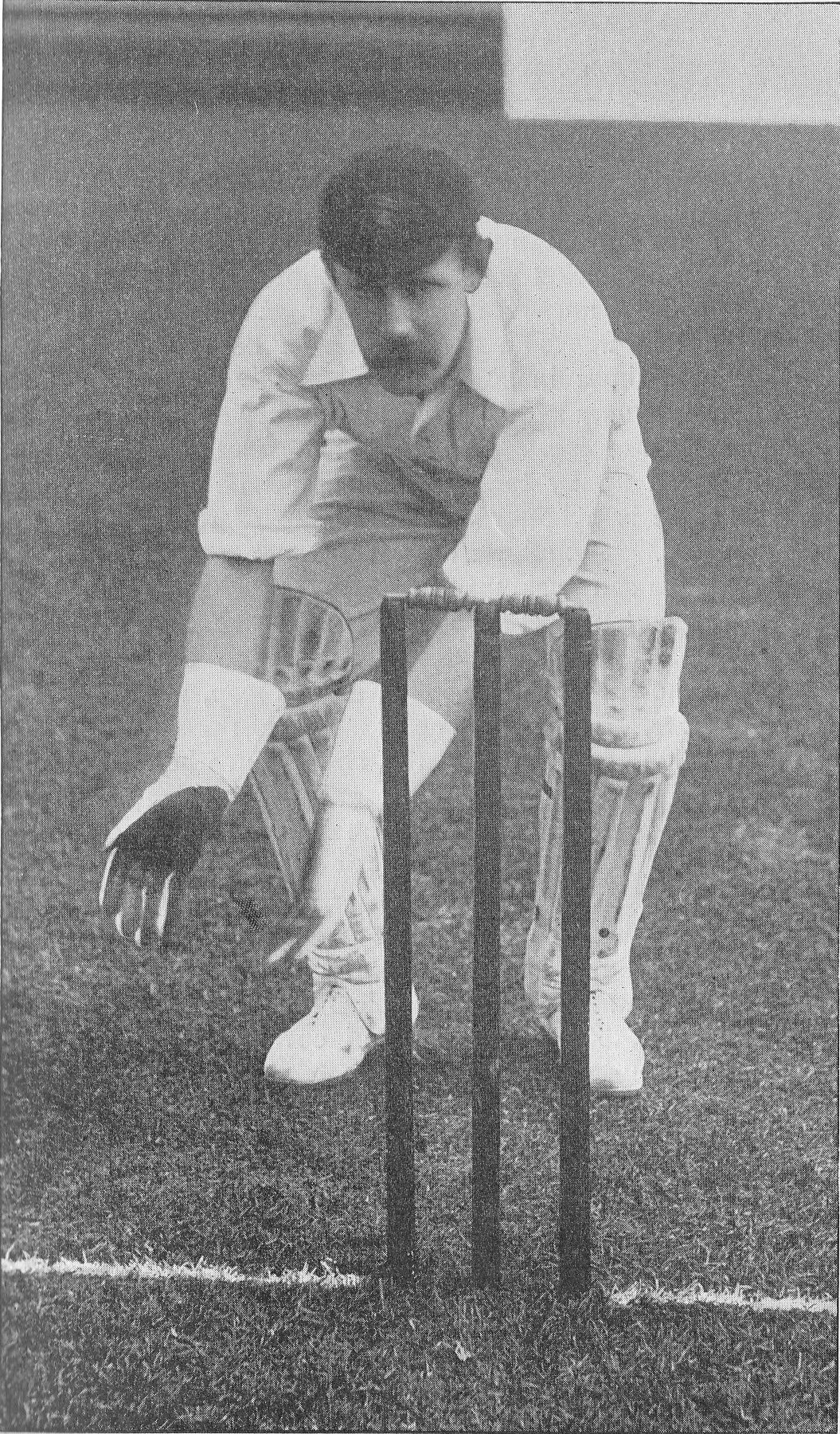
Bill Storer, 1897

- Sir James Outram, 1st Baronet (1803–1863), born in Ripley, fought in the Indian Rebellion of 1857 and became known as the "Bayard of India". He was buried in Westminster Abbey.
- Jesse Clement Gray (1854–1912), a co-operative movement activist.
- John Bamford Slack (1857–1909), Liberal MP for St Albans and prominent Methodist, was born in Ripley.
- Agnes Elizabeth Slack (1858–1946), a leading temperance campaigner, was born here.
- Arthur Octavius Edwards (1876–1960), civil engineer who built and managed the Grosvenor House Hotel in London, was born in Ripley.
- Wilfred Paling (1883–1971), politician, MP for Doncaster, 1922/1931 & Wentworth 1933/1950 & Dearne Valley 1950/1959
- Sir Barnes Wallis (1887–1979), inventor of the "bouncing bomb", was born in Ripley; a park is named after him and a pub, The Sir Barnes Wallis, until it was demolished in 2021. His house of birth bears a blue plaque
- Bombardier Charles Stone (1889–1952), awarded the Victoria Cross, served in the Royal Field Artillery, born in Ripley.
- William Paling (1892–1992), politician, MP for Dewsbury 1945 to 1959
- Alec Horsley (1902–1993), a businessman, Quaker, peace movement advocate and founder of Northern Foods
- Gavin Butt (born 1967), art historian based at Goldsmiths, University of London, was born in Ripley.
- Andy Sneap (born 1969), a heavy metal record producer and thrash metal musician, whose company Backstage Productions is local
- Ben Bradley (born 1989), politician who served as MP for Mansfield from 2017 to 2024.

=== Sport ===
- Edwin Coup (1861–1892), cricketer who played 13 first-class cricket matches for Derbyshire
- Bill Storer (1867–1912), footballer and cricketer who played six Test cricket matches for England and 289 first-class matches for Derbyshire
- Alfred Strange (1900–1978), footballer who played 382 games including 253 for Sheffield Wednesday
- James Cresswell (1903–1994), cricketer who played 21 first-class matches for Derbyshire
- William Allsop (1912–1997), footballer who played 239 games for Halifax Town
- Peter Daniel (1946), footballer who played 195 games for Derby County.

== See also ==
- History of Methodism in Ripley Derbyshire
- Listed buildings in Ripley, Derbyshire
