= Toadmoor Tunnel =

Railway tunnel in Derbyshire, England

Coordinates: 53.06051°N 1.48070°W

- Interactive map of Toadmoor Tunnel

Overview
- Other name: Hag Wood Tunnel
- Line: North Midland Railway
- Location: Ambergate, Derbyshire, England
- Status: In use
- System: Rail

Operation
- Constructed: Cut-and-cover, brick arch, stone retaining walls and invert
- Opened: 1840
- Owner: Network Rail
- Traffic: Rail

Technical
- Design engineer: Frederick Swanwick
- Length: 128 yards (117 metres)
- Grade II listed, part of Derwent Valley World Heritage Site

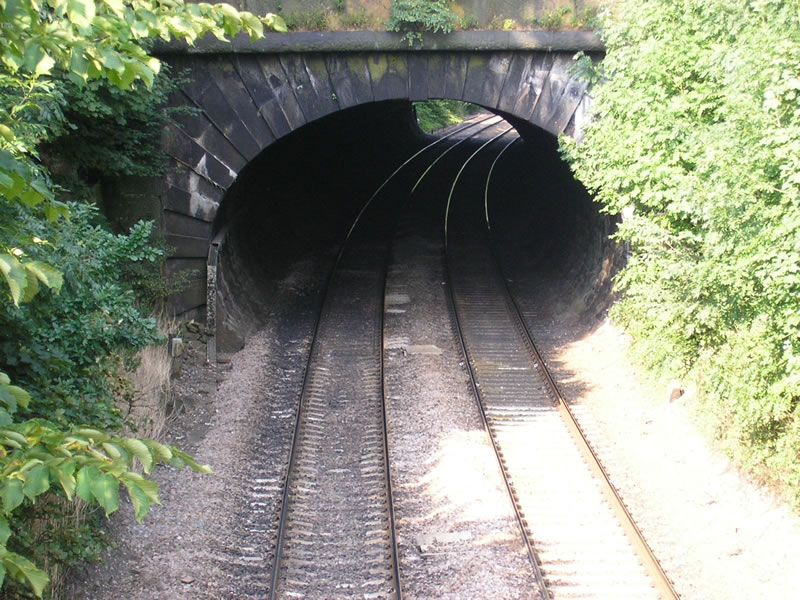
Toadmoor Tunnel portal showing elliptical shape of bore

Toadmoor Tunnel (originally called Hag Wood Tunnel) was built at Ambergate in Derbyshire, England, as part of the North Midland Railway, which opened in 1840.

128 yards long, it was cut through an unstable hillside on a notoriously difficult line of route. What had initially been expected to be acceptably strong coal-bearing rock turned out to be wet shale. On beginning excavation a landslide occurred, the effects of which can still be seen further up the bank in Thatcher's Wood.

The engineer Frederick Swanwick decided to proceed using the cut-and- cover method, with stone retaining walls and invert, and a brick-built masonry arch over the top, which gives it its unusual elliptical shape. Because of this, it took 15 months to build, instead of the planned two.

It is thought that a second landslip may have occurred sometime later, so that it was braced with steel hoops at its southern end.

Because of the tunnel cross section the depth of ballast under the track is adequate in the centre but almost nothing close to the walls, which produces settlement in the middle and crushed ballast at the edges.

Other problems arise with a need for increased line speed and the arrival of electrification, not least because it is Grade II listed and part of the Derwent Valley World Heritage Site.
