= Bullbridge =

Village in Derbyshire, England

Coordinates: 53.068°N 1.468°W

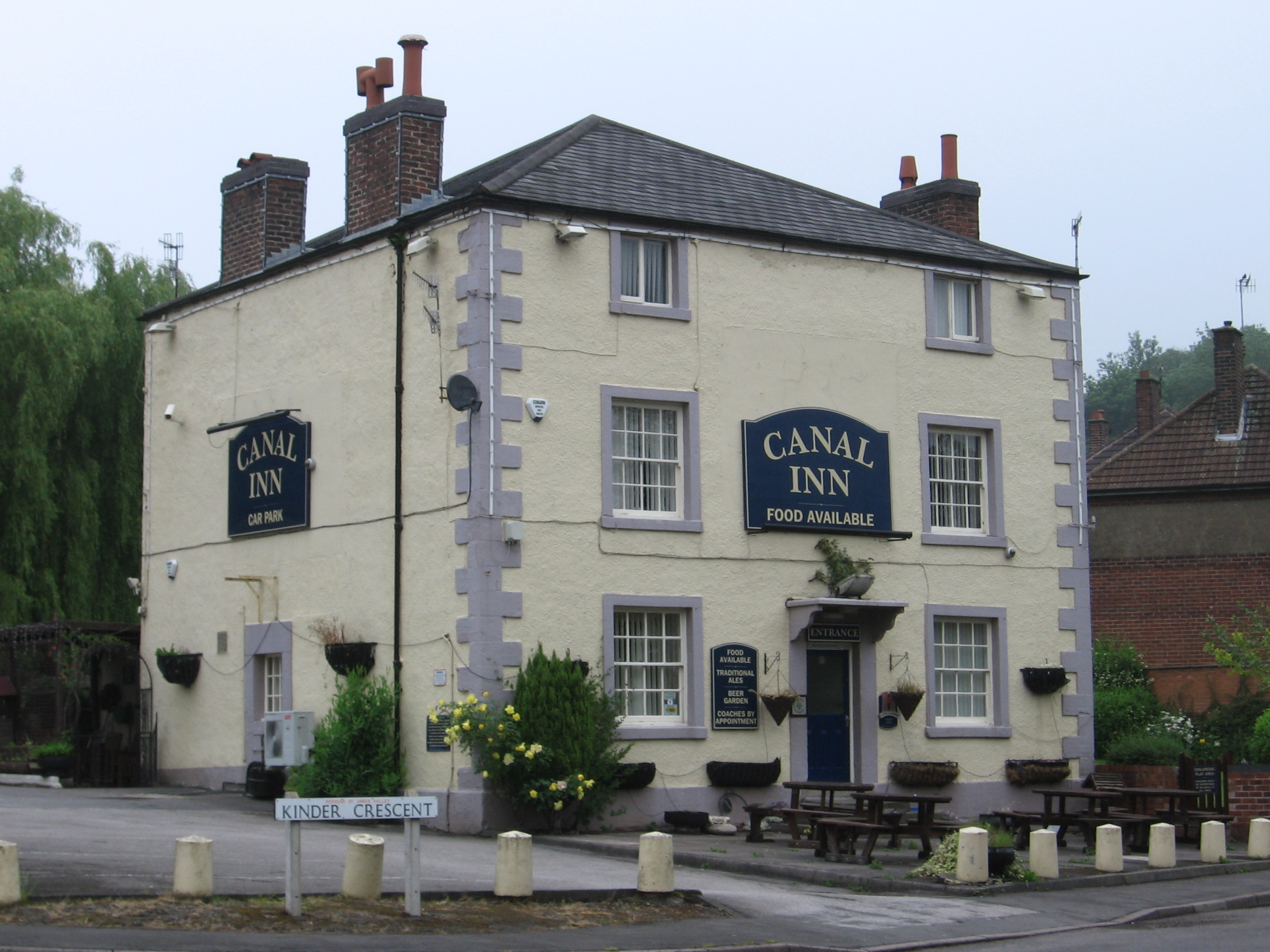
- Canal Inn

- Location within Derbyshire
- Population: 220 (2001)
- OS grid reference: SK357524
- District: Amber Valley
- Shire county: Derbyshire
- Region: East Midlands
- Country: England
- Sovereign state: United Kingdom
- Post town: AMBERGATE
- Postcode district: DE56
- Police: Derbyshire
- Fire: Derbyshire
- Ambulance: East Midlands

Bullbridge is a small village in Derbyshire. The Bull bridge accident, in which a railway bridge failed as a goods train was just passing over it, happened here in 1860.

== The village ==
Bullbridge has a population of approximately 220 and one public house: the Canal Inn (named after the Cromford Canal). A second pub, The Lord Nelson is now closed. From the 2011 Census the population was included in the town of Ripley, Derbyshire.

Until the end of the eighteenth century it was little more than the bridge over the River Amber for the road from Crich.

In 1794, William Jessop and Benjamin Outram built the Cromford Canal between Cromford and Langley Mill, with the Bullbridge Aqueduct crossing the road. In 1840, George Stephenson brought the North Midland Railway past on its way to Leeds. The rail line crossed the road, but passed under the canal.

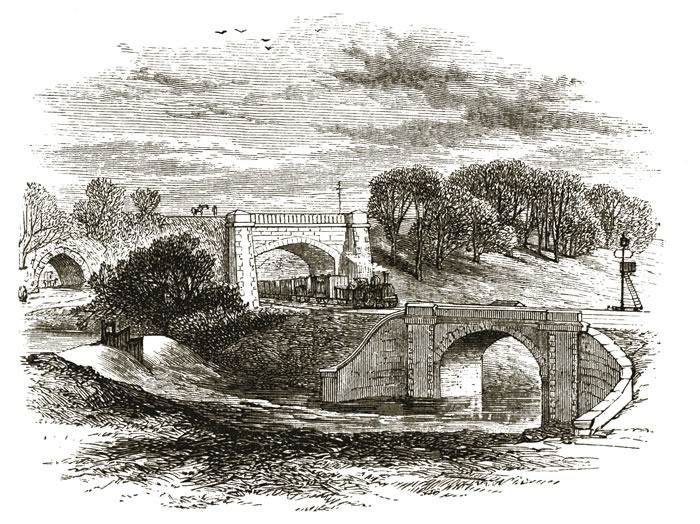
Bullbridge Aqueduct from the east

In 1860 the railway bridge failed as a goods train passed over it, but without casualties.

The steep wagonway to the Cromford Canal from the quarry at Crich to Bullbridge, where limestone was sent on to the Butterley Ironworks, was known as the Butterley Gangroad. Initially worked by gravity and horse power, in 1812, William Brunton, an engineer for the company, produced his remarkable Steam Horse locomotive. They built a wharf for loading the limestone from their quarry at Crich, and a group of lime kilns.

In 1825 James Stephenson founded a dye works at Wirksworth, opening branches in Duffield and Little Eaton, then Belper, and finally building his main works at Bullbridge in 1908. The works became part of Coats plc and closed at the end of 2006.

Hilt's Quarry and the gangway closed in 1933 and are now derelict, the canal having already been virtually closed by the subsidence of Butterley Tunnel.

== See also ==
- Listed buildings in Ripley, Derbyshire
