= Butterley Company =

English manufacturing company

Coordinates: 53°3′35.43″N 1°24′11.40″W

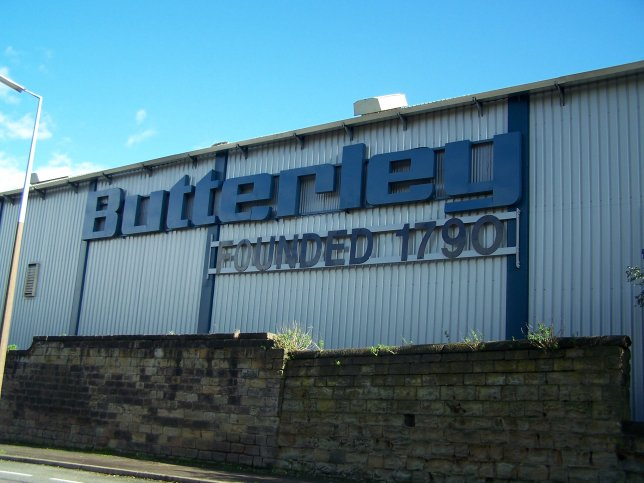
- Type: Manufacturing firm
- Industry: Engineering, oil, nuclear engineering
- Founded: 1790
- Founder: Benjamin Outram
- Headquarters: Ripley, Derbyshire
- Products: Cranes, fabrications, structures
- Parent: Former Hanson plc subsidiary
- Divisions: Cranes, Structures, Fabrication
- Footnotes; Founded as Benjamin Outram and Company

The Butterley Company was an English manufacturing firm founded as Benjamin Outram and Company in 1790. Its subsidiaries existed until 2009.

== Origins ==
This area of Derbyshire had been known for its outcrops of iron ore which had been exploited at least since the Middle Ages. After the Norman Conquest, nearby Duffield Frith was the property of the de Ferrers family who were iron masters in Normandy.

In 1793, William Jessop, with the assistance of Benjamin Outram, constructed the Cromford Canal to connect Pinxton and Cromford with the Erewash Canal. In digging Butterley Tunnel for the Cromford Canal, coal and iron were discovered. Fortuitously, Butterley Hall fell vacant and in 1790 Outram, with the financial assistance of Francis Beresford, bought it and its estate.

The following year Outram and Beresford were joined by Jessop and John, the grandson of Ichabod Wright, a wealthy Nottingham banker who was betrothed to Beresford's daughter and who owned the neighbouring Butterley Park estate.

In 1793 the French Revolutionary Wars broke out and by 1796 the blast furnace was producing nearly a thousand tons of pig iron a year. By the 1810s the company had expanded with another works at Codnor Park in Codnor, both works then having two blast furnaces, and output had risen to around 4,500 tons per year.

== Early years ==
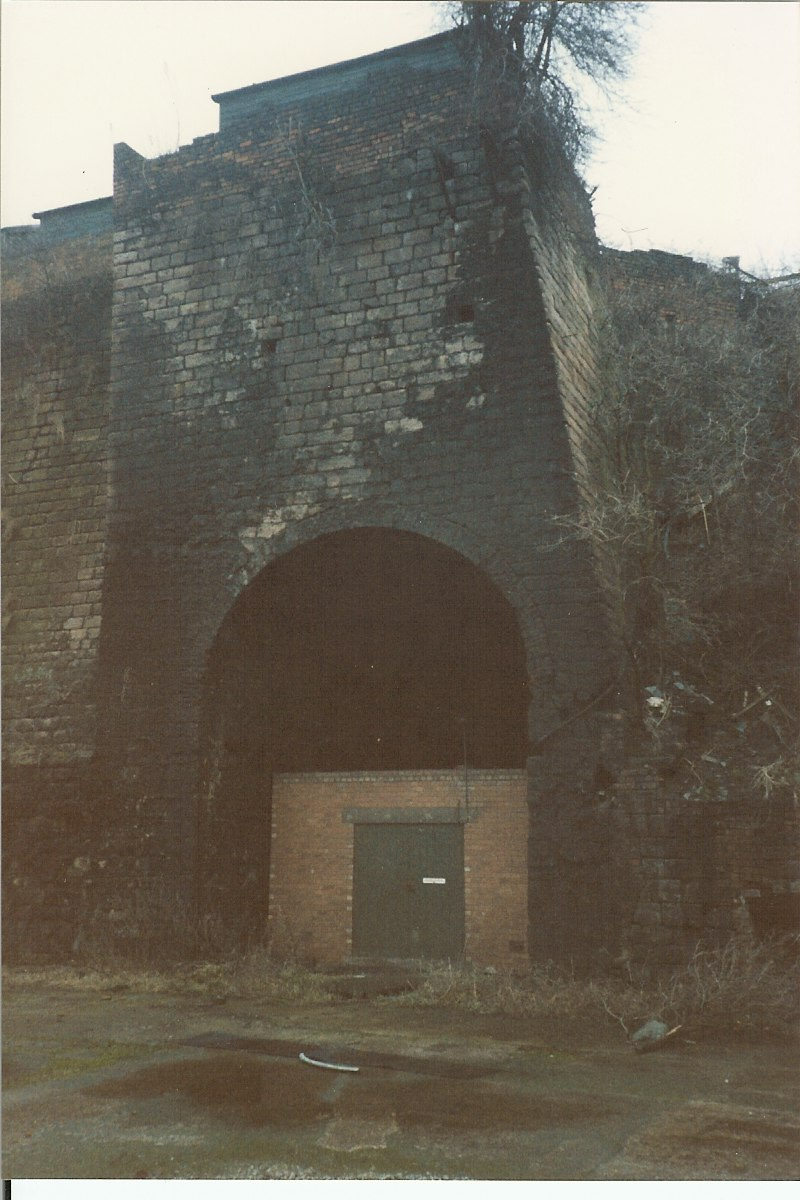
Blast furnace from 1790 exposed through building demolition in 1986

Outram died in 1805 and the name changed to the Butterley Company, with one of Jessop's sons, also William, taking over.

In 1814 the company produced the iron work for Vauxhall Bridge over the River Thames.

The company also owned Hilt's Quarry at Crich, which supplied limestone for the ironworks and for the limekilns at Bullbridge, providing lime for farmers and for the increasing amount of building work. The steep wagonway to the Cromford Canal at Bullbridge was called the Butterley Gangroad and incorporated the world's oldest surviving railway tunnel, at Fritchley (built 1793). In 1812, William Brunton, an engineer for the company, produced his remarkable Steam Horse locomotive

In 1817, in the depression following the Napoleonic Wars, the works at Butterley was the scene of the Pentrich Revolution. The intention of the rebels was to kill the three senior managers and ransack the works for weapons. When they arrived they were confronted by George Goodwin the factory agent, who, with a few constables, faced them down. There is little to be seen of the event, but the hexagonal office where Goodwin stood his ground is a listed building in the yard of the works.

Following this the country entered a long period of prosperity, the company with it. In 1830 it was considered to be the largest coal owner and the second-largest iron producer in the East Midlands. By this time the company owned a considerable number of quarries for limestone and mines for coal and iron, and installed a third blast furnace at Codnor Park. In 1830, John Wright withdrew from the partnership and passed his interest in the company to his twenty-four year old son, Francis Wright. Francis worked for his first years at Butterley with William Jessop the younger (the founding partner's son), and then remained very involved with the company until his death in 1873, building the town of Ironville to house Butterley workers, and often travelling for miles every day by horse and carriage from his estate at Osmaston near Ashbourne to Ripley. It was under Francis' leadership that Butterley supplied the iron for St Pancras Station, and after his death, the leadership of the Company passed to many of his descendants.

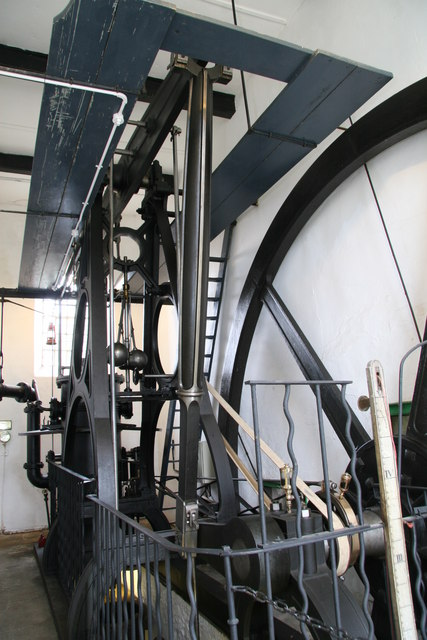
1833 Butterley 'A' frame engine at Pinchbeck, believed to be the oldest 'A' frame engine still in situ

One of the two drainage engines at Pode Hole and the engine in the Pinchbeck Engine land drainage museum were built by Butterley, as were the Scoop wheel pumps.

They produced a vast array of goods, from rails for wagonways to heaters for tea urns. Thomas Telford's Caledonian Canal used lock gates and machinery with castings produced at Butterley, and two steam dredgers designed by Jessop. The company also produced steam locomotives, mostly for its own use, but it provided two for the Midland Counties Railway.

It produced all the necessary castings for the new railways and two complete lines, the Croydon, Merstham and Godstone Iron Railway and the Cromford and High Peak Railway. A winding engine for the latter exists in working order at Middleton Top near Wirksworth.

The company was quick to invest in the new Bessemer process for steel manufacture in 1856, being one of four businesses that took out a licence from Sir Henry Bessemer within a month of his announcing his method. The licences were spread around the country in order to protect the trading interests of the licensees.

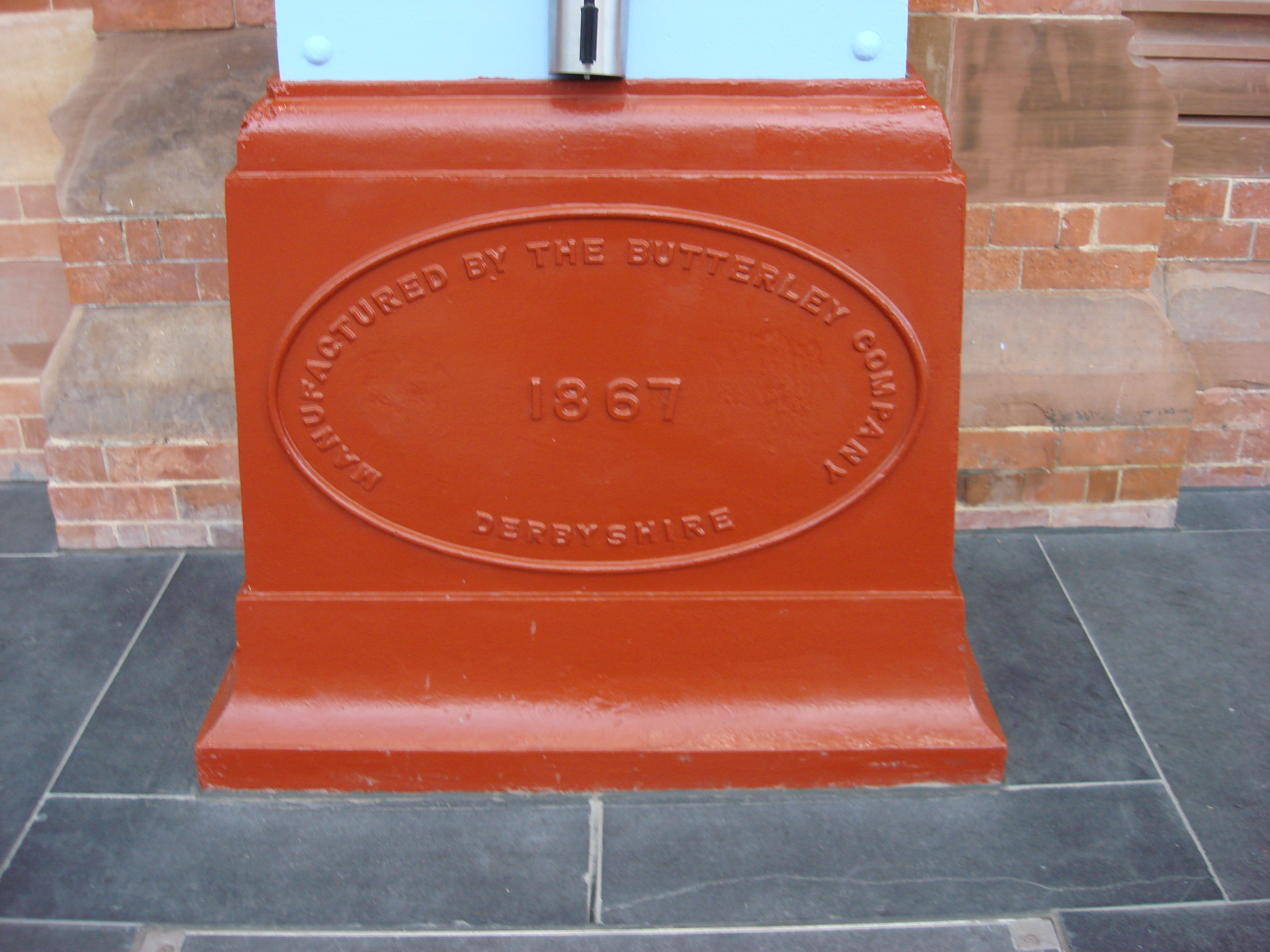
Butterley Company plate in St Pancras station

Notable patents were taken out by the company's manager, Sir John Alleyne. In December 1859 Alleyne patented a method of producing a load-bearing iron beam known as the Butterley Bulb, used in many early iron steam ships including HMS Warrior In 1861 Alleyne patented a method that allowed hot ingots to be moved around a roller after they had passed by just one person. During the production of steel sections the bar has to be repeatedly put through rollers. Allowing this to happen using just one person was a substantial increase in productivity. By 1863 the company was rolling the largest masses of iron of any foundry in the country. Among its most famous buildings are the Barlow train shed at St Pancras station in London, which included 240-foot spans.

Alleyne's next invention was the two high reversing steel mill patented in 1870, which used two steam engines to allow metal ingots to be repeatedly rolled to get the correct size and section. With this technique the steel did not have to be moved to re-enter the rolling process but merely had to be moved back into the rolling machine once it had passed through.

There was also an extensive brickworks for railways, thousands of factories and domestic dwellings.

By 1874 company workers were starting to fight for better conditions. The company sacked 11 miners "without a charge" on 5 May 1874. In 1885 the Butterley Company made the Grade II listed footbridge for Cromford Station, which was used by Oasis for a photograph shoot for the record sleeve for their 1995 single called 'Some might say.' The Old Godavari Bridge, also known as the Havelock Bridge, was constructed with stone masonry and steel girders in 1896 linking Rajahmundry in East Godavari to Kovvuru in West Godavari in Andhra Pradesh, India. It has 56 spans each of 45.7 metres (150 ft)and is 3,480 metres (11,420 ft) long. The girders were fabricated by the Butterley Company of Ripley, Derbyshire. The rail bridge served the busy Howrah-Chennai line until its decommissioning, a century later, in 1997 when a replacement bridge was built at the side of the Old Godavari Bridge. The bridge is being used to host the civic water supply and there are plans for it to be a tourist destination.

== 20th century ==
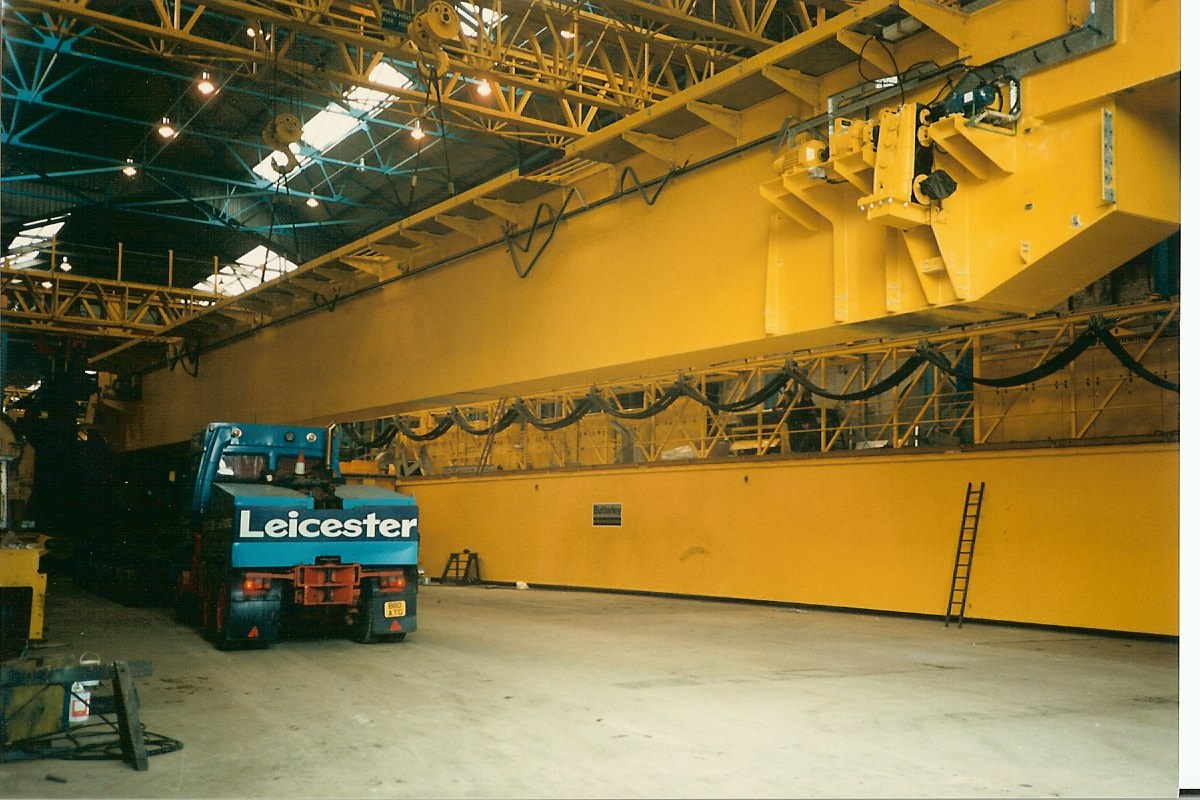
Crane being prepared for road transport in 1988

Discussing the war work which the Butterley Company undertook during WW2, Roy Christian stated that "The workers who made mysterious floats had no idea of their ultimate purpose until one morning in June 1944 they realised that their products were helping to support the Mulberry Harbour off the low coastline of Normandy, and by that time they were busy building pontoon units and Bailey bridge panels ready for the breakthrough into Germany. But if they were often in the dark about the purpose and destination of the products over which they toiled for days in workshop, forge and foundry, they understood their importance. No time was lost through the war years on strikes or disputes, and absenteeism was low.

Some of those workers were women, for in the first time in its history female labour was being employed at the Butterley works."

=== Coal nationalisation ===
When the coal business was nationalised, on Vesting Day, 1 January 1947, control of all of the company's collieries: Denby Hall, New Langley, Ormonde and Ripley in Derbyshire, as well as Kirkby and Ollerton in Nottinghamshire, was transferred to the National Coal Board.

=== Downsizing ===
At its peak in the 1950s the company employed around 10,000 people.

In 1957, a partnership with Air Products of the USA helped establish that company in the United Kingdom.

In the early 1960s the company acquired locomotive manufacturer F. C. Hibberd & Co Ltd.

The Codnor Park works closed in 1965.

In 1966, Montagu "Monty" Francis Melville Wright retired as Chairman and was succeeded by Robert William Francis Wilberforce; John Leslie Fitzwalter Wright, son of (Edward) Fitzwalter Wright became vice-Chairman. He was the sixth generation of the Wright family to join Butterley. The last descendant of John Wright to be a director was (Philip) Norman Wright, who retired after the takeover in 1968.

The company was acquired by the Wiles Group, which later became Hanson Trust, in 1968 for £4.7 million. The company was subsequently split up into Butterley Engineering, Butterley Brick and Butterley Aggregates. Butterley Hall, which had been home to Outram and then to Albert Leslie Wright before his death in 1938, after which it became offices, was sold off to become the headquarters of Derbyshire Constabulary.

Butterley Engineering Co. manufactured the Glengall Bridge across the Millwall Dock in London, which was designed to open to allow shipping traffic to pass through. The same year, Butterley Engineering Co., known for their expertise with high-tech cranes, were awarded the contract to manufacture a special 'super-safe' crane to work above the reactor at Sizewell B nuclear power station in Suffolk. In the mid 1980s the foundry closed down. When surplus buildings were demolished the original blast furnace of 1790 was exposed.

== 21st century ==
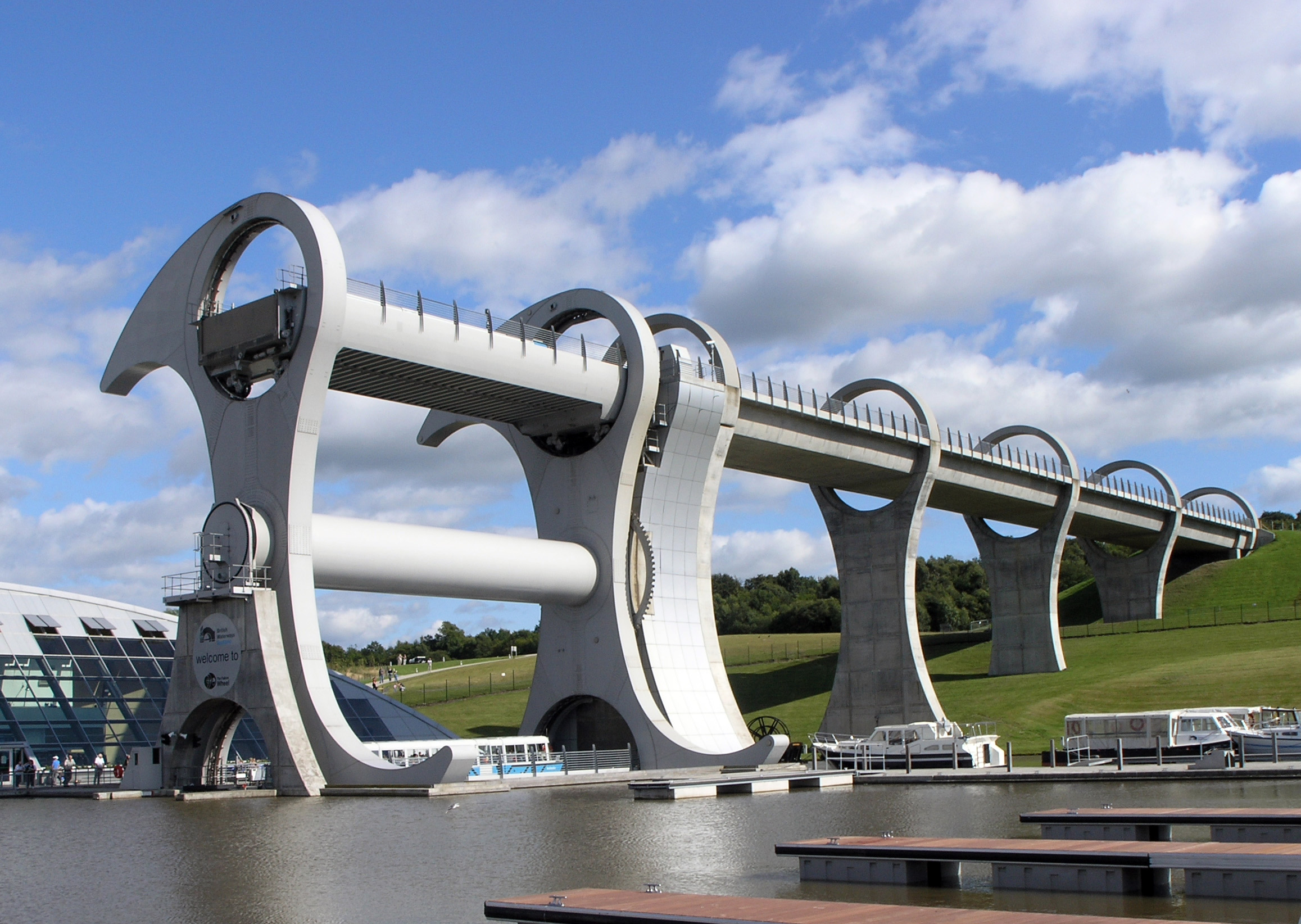
The Falkirk Wheel

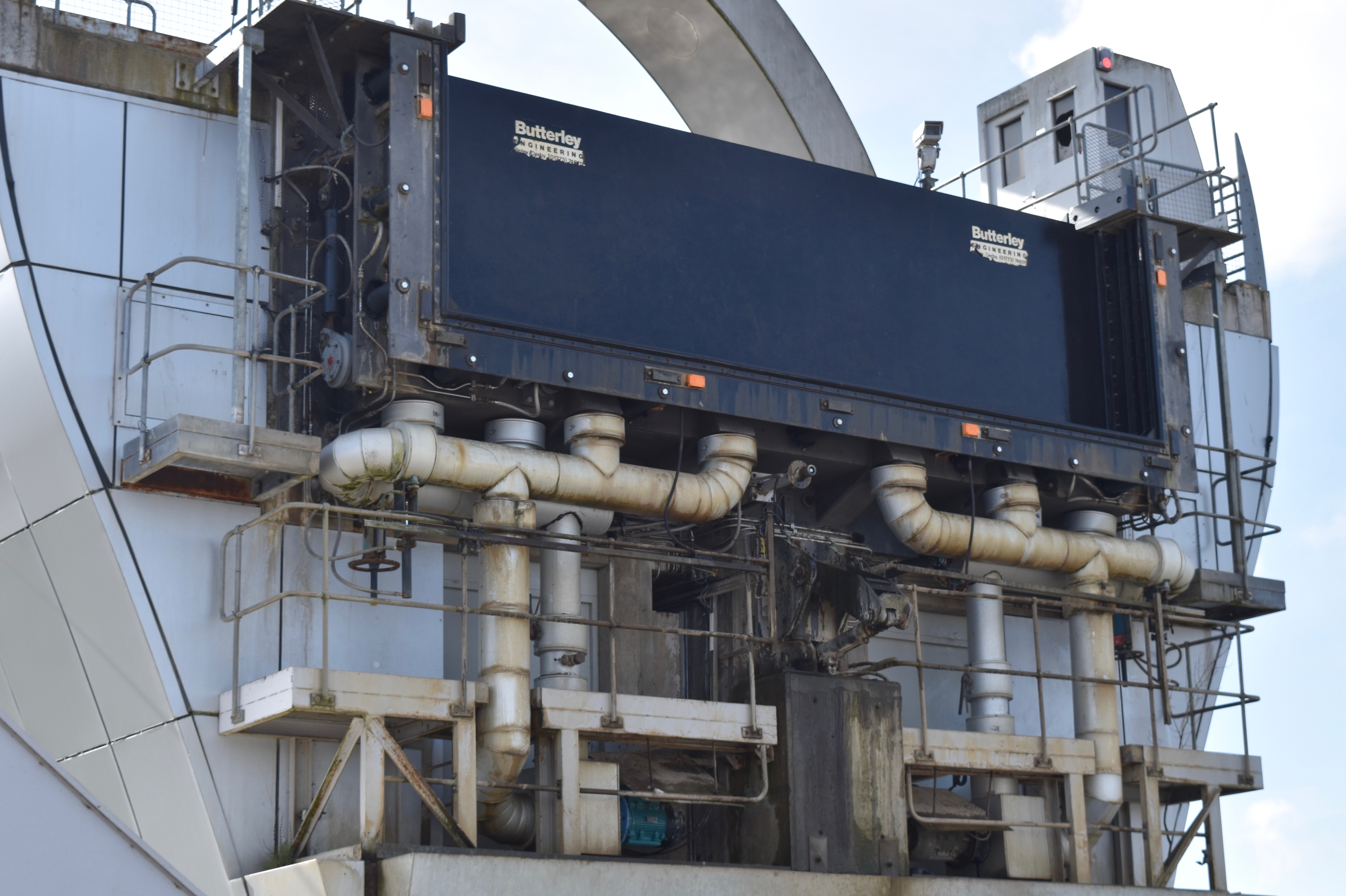
Butterley watertight door at the Falkirk Wheel

The company entered the 21st century with a well-established reputation for constructing bridges, overhead cranes and structural steelwork.

One of the company's prestige projects was the Falkirk Wheel, a boatlift at Falkirk, Scotland to reconnect the Forth & Clyde Canal and the Union Canal in place of a derelict flight of 11 locks. Designed by RMJM architects, it was funded by the Millennium Commission.

The company constructed the Spinnaker Tower in Portsmouth.

On 5 March 2009, the company was placed into administration, the administrator stating "This is a highly specialist business that has proven vulnerable to the economic downturn". Following the closure of Butterley Limited in 2009, Wellman Booth acquired certain assets, spares and intellectual property rights of the company. Wellman Booth is a division of The Clarke Chapman Group Ltd, itself a wholly owned subsidiary of Langley Holdings plc. After completion of the acquisition, Clarke Chapman Services, a division of Clarke Chapman added Butterley, Adamson, Adamson Alliance and John Smith (Keighley) cranes to the list of brands for which they provide parts and service.

In March 2024, the website of Clarke Chapman Limited, formerly The Clarke Chapman Group Limited, was updated with the name 'Butterley Engineering' re-introduced as one of Clarke Chapman's 'Brands' including use the resurrection of the 'Butterley Engineering' logo, seemingly with the intention to pursue potential new work and/or parts provision outside of the other Clarke Chapman divisions.

Demolition of the works was undertaken in November and December 2009. The blast furnaces, part of the canal tunnel and its underground wharf were declared a scheduled monument in 2013.

The Butterley Ironworks Trust was formed in 2015 to formulate plans for future uses of the remaining Butterley Company buildings, archaeological remains and the Butterley Tunnel.

== Footnotes ==
- Duke of Portland's estate papers relating to Coal seams (Derbyshire & Notts)
