= Listed buildings in Crich =

Crich is a civil parish in the Amber Valley district of Derbyshire, England. The parish contains 52 listed buildings that are recorded in the National Heritage List for England. Of these, one is listed at Grade I, the highest of the three grades, one is at Grade II*, the middle grade, and the others are at Grade II, the lowest grade. The parish contains the villages of Crich, Fritchley, Whatstandwell, and Wheatcroft, and the surrounding countryside. Most of the listed buildings are houses, cottages and associated structures, farmhouses and farm buildings. In the parish is the National Tramway Museum, and a number of structures that have been moved from other sites to the museum are listed. The other listed buildings include churches and chapels, a bridge over the Cromford Canal and a road bridge over the River Derwent, public houses, buildings associated with tramways, a milepost, a village cross, a memorial tower, and a village telephone kiosk.

== Key ==
Grade	Criteria
I	Buildings of exceptional interest, sometimes considered to be internationally important
II*	Particularly important buildings of more than special interest
II	Buildings of national importance and special interest

== Buildings ==
Name and location	Photograph	Date	Notes	Grade
St Mary's Church; 53.08805°N 1.48189°W		12th century	The church has been expanded and altered through the centuries, and was restored in 1861. It is built in gritstone, and has roofs of lead and tile. The church consists of a nave with a clerestory, north and south aisles, a south porch, a chancel, a north vestry, and a west steeple. The steeple has a tower with three stages, angle buttresses, moulded string courses, and a west clock face. At the top are grotesque corner spouts, and a parapet decorated with trefoils and moulded coping. The tower is surmounted by a recessed octagonal spire with lucarnes at three levels. Along the nave are embattled parapets.	I
Old Farm; 53.07202°N 1.46710°W	—	Late 16th century	The house, originally a farmhouse, is in gritstone with quoins and a roof of stone slate and tile. There are two storeys and an L-shaped plan, with a front range of three bays, and a single-storey bay on the right. On the front are two doorways with chamfered quoined surrounds, and four-centred arched lintel soffits. Some windows are mullioned, some have been altered and some are casements.	II
Cruck barn, Beech Farm; 53.11369°N 1.47838°W	—	17th century	The barn is in gritstone with quoins at the north end, and a tile roof with stone slate eaves. There is a single storey and three bays, and the barn contains two doorways, one blocked, and a fixed window. Inside there are three cruck trusses.	II
Cottage and barn east of Church Farmhouse; 53.07265°N 1.46842°W	—	17th century	The barn and the cottage attached to the right are in gritstone with quoins and tile roofs. The cottage has two storeys and one bay, and contains two mullioned windows and a casement window. The barn has a single storey and three bays, and contains the remains of two cruck trusses.	II
Hollins Farmhouse; 53.10034°N 1.47214°W	—	17th century	The farmhouse, which possibly has an earlier core, was refashioned in the late 18th century. It is in gritstone, with quoins, moulded bands, and a roof of stone slate and tile with coped gables and moulded kneelers. There are two storeys and a T-shaped plan, with a front range of two bays and a rear lean-to. The central doorway has a chamfered and quoined surround and a heavy lintel, and the windows on the front are sashes. Elsewhere, are single-light and mullioned windows.	II
Cruck barn, Lindway Lane Farm; 53.12052°N 1.47508°W	—	17th century or earlier	The barn is in gritstone with a tile roof, four bays, and buttresses at the south end. It contains two doorways with stable doors. Inside there are three cruck trusses.	II
Benthill; 53.08511°N 1.49427°W	—	Early 18th century	A farmhouse in gritstone with quoins, and a slate roof with coped gables and moulded kneelers. There are two storeys, and an L-shaped plan, with a front of four bays, and gabled rear outshuts. On the front are two doorways with massive quoined surrounds and lintels. Some of the windows are mullioned, and others are sashes.	II
Plaistow Grange Farmhouse; 53.10226°N 1.48437°W	—	Early 18th century	The farmhouse, which possibly has an earlier core, is in gritstone with quoins, and a Welsh slate roof with coped gables and moulded kneelers. There are two storeys, and an L-shaped plan, with a front range of two bays, and a rear wing. The doorway has a quoined surround and a massive lintel, and the windows are mullioned.	II
The Mansion House and outbuilding 53.08434°N 1.47889°W		Early 18th century	The house is in gritstone with quoins, stone slate eaves, and a Welsh slate roof with coped gables and moulded kneelers. There are two storeys and attics, three bays, and a long two-storey cross wing at the rear. The doorway has a plain surround, to its right is a two-light mullioned window with Gothic glazing, most of the other windows have been altered, and in the attic are three gabled dormers. To the west is a former barn with slit vents.	II
The Mount; 53.08541°N 1.47864°W	—	Early 18th century	The house, which contains elements of an earlier house, is in gritstone with quoins, bands, and a stone slate roof with coped gables and moulded kneelers. The main range has three storeys and two bays, and there is a double-pile cross-wing to the west. The doorway has a quoined surround and a semicircular fanlight, and the windows are cross windows, those in the top floor raised to form flat-roofed dormers.	II
Bower House; 53.07739°N 1.47737°W	—	Mid 18th century	A gritstone house with quoins, and a tile roof with coped gables and moulded kneelers. There are two storeys and two bays. The doorway has a massive lintel and jambs, and a bracketed hood. The windows are mullioned with three lights, and contain casements.	II
Church Farmhouse; 53.07270°N 1.46873°W	—	Mid 18th century	The former farmhouse is in gritstone, with quoins, and a Welsh slate roof with coped gables and moulded kneelers. There is an L-shaped plan, consisting of a main range of two storeys and three bays, and an incorporated single-storey outbuilding on the right. The central doorway has a quoined surround and a massive lintel, and the windows, originally mullioned, are now sashes.	II
Dial Farmhouse; 53.07772°N 1.47601°W	—	Mid 18th century	A gritstone farmhouse with quoins, and a tile roof with coped gables and moulded kneelers. There are two storeys and attics and an irregular T-shaped plan, with a main range of three bays, and a rear wing. The doorway has a massive quoined surround, and a shallow moulded bracketed hood. The windows, formerly mullioned, are sashes, and there is a two-light stair window. At attic level is a square sundial plate.	II
Park Head Farmhouse; 53.08734°N 1.46244°W	—	Mid 18th century	The farmhouse, which incorporates some 17th-century material, is in sandstone with quoins and a Welsh slate roof. There are two storeys and three bays, the right bay recessed. On the front are two doorways, the left one with a massive lintel and surround, and the right one with a plain surround, and the windows are sashes.	II
The Barns and outbuildings 53.08557°N 1.47877°W	—	Mid 18th century	A house and attached outbuildings in gritstone, with quoins, and roofs of tile and corrugated sheet with coped gables and moulded kneelers, forming an L-shaped plan. The house has two storeys and two bays, and it contains a blocked doorway with a massive surround, and casement windows. The outbuildings have various openings, and there is an external staircase incorporating a dog kennel, a cheese-making cupboard and a fuel store.	II
Façade of the former Derby Assembly Rooms; 53.08971°N 1.48618°W		1763–4	The building was moved to its present site in the National Tramway Museum in 1975–76. It is in gritstone with a rusticated basement. There are five bays, the middle three bays projecting, with three storeys under a pediment containing sculptures of musical instruments in the tympanum, and the outer bays have two storeys. The central doorway has a Gibbs surround and is flanked by sash windows with voussoirs, and in the outer bays are semicircular-headed double doorways with voussoirs. The upper floor contains windows with architraves, pulvinated friezes, alternating segmental and triangular pediments, the middle window with attached Ionic columns, and the middle three with balustrades below. The top floor of the middle three bays contains square openings, and on the outer bays are balustrades with square terminal piers and banded ball finials.	II
Crich Wesleyan Chapel and walls 53.07938°N 1.47827°W		1765	The chapel is in gritstone with quoins and a hipped slate roof. There are two storeys and two bays, and a single-storey extension on the left. On the ground floor are two doorways with quoined surrounds and massive lintels, and between them is a 20th-century window with a massive lintel and jambs. The upper floor contains two semicircular-headed windows with Gothic glazing. Enclosing the forecourt are low walls with railings, and matching gates between stone piers.	II
Wakebridge Farmhouse; 53.09740°N 1.49659°W	—	1772	The farmhouse, which incorporates elements from an earlier house, is in gritstone on a plinth, with quoins, and a stone slate roof with coped gables and moulded kneelers. There are two storeys and a T-shaped plan, with a range of four bays, and an outhouse to the west. The doorway has a moulded quoined surround and a four-centred arch to the lintel soffit, and over it is an initialled and dated plaque. The window above the doorway has a single light, and the other windows are mullioned.	II
10 and 12 Bowns Hill; 53.08537°N 1.47814°W	—	Late 18th century	A pair of gritstone houses with quoins, and a slate roof with coped gables and moulded kneelers. There are two storeys and four bays, the two right bays double-depth. In the centre is a doorway flanked by shop windows with moulded cornices. There is a sash window, and the other windows are mullioned.	II
31 Hindersitch Lane; 53.08779°N 1.49746°W	—	Late 18th century	A cottage in gritstone with quoins and a slate roof. There are two storeys and two bays. The central doorway has a plain surround, and the windows are mullioned with two lights and contain casements.	II
12, 14 and 16 The Common; 53.08222°N 1.47865°W		Late 18th century	A row of three gritstone houses with slate roofs, three storeys, and a rear wing. On the front are four doorways with massive jambs and lintels. The windows are placed irregularly and most are replaced sashes. In the top floor of the right house is an eight-light workshop window, and there is another workshop window in the rear wing.	II
Canal bridge 53.08507°N 1.50510°W		Late 18th century	The bridge carries Main Road (B5035 road) over the Cromford Canal. It is in gritstone, and consists of a single semicircular arch. The bridge has voussoirs, a band, shallow parapets with rounded copings, and splayed abutments.	II
Glebe Farmhouse; 53.10456°N 1.48412°W	—	Late 18th century	A gritstone farmhouse with quoins, and a tile roof with stone slate eaves. There are two storeys and two bays. On the front is a flat-roofed porch, and the windows are mullioned and contain sashes.	II
Honeymoon Cottage, Sheaf Cottage and Sheaf House; 53.08694°N 1.48124°W	—	Late 18th century	A terrace of a house and two cottages, in gritstone, partly roughcast, with quoins, and roofs tiled at the north and stone slated at the south with coped gables. The buildings are stepped, with five bays, the right bay, the house, with three storeys, and cottages with three bays and one bay. The house has mullioned windows, and the windows in the cottages are sashes. Through the middle bay of the middle building is a passageway.	II
Lindway Lane Farmhouse; 53.12053°N 1.47473°W	—	Late 18th century	The refashioning of an earlier house, the farmhouse is in gritstone with quoins and a Welsh slate roof. There are two storeys, and two linked stepped ranges, each with two bays. In the west range is a doorway with a quoined surround and a massive lintel, and mullioned windows. The east range contains two doorways and casement windows.	II
Former Derwent Hotel; 53.08559°N 1.50615°W		Late 18th century	The former public house is in gritstone with roofs of Welsh slate and tile. There are two storeys and two three-bay ranges, the left range recessed. In both ranges are sash windows, The left range has a doorway with a quoined surround and a shallow bracketed hood, and in the right range is a doorway with massive jambs and lintel.	II
Outbuilding, former Derwent Hotel; 53.08572°N 1.50604°W	—	Late 18th century	The outbuilding is in gritstone with quoins and a Welsh slate roof. There are two storeys and three bays. The building contains three doorways with quoined surrounds, substantial lintels, and stable doors, and the windows are sashes.	II
Range of three cottages, Whatstandwell; 53.08497°N 1.50448°W	—	Late 18th century	A public house, later divided into three cottages, it is in gritstone, with quoins, and a Welsh slate roof with coped gables and moulded kneelers. There are two storeys and three bays, the left bay lower. On the front are three doorways with quoined surrounds and massive lintels, the windows in the left bay are mullioned, and the other windows are sashes.	II
The Black Swan public house and outbuildings 53.08459°N 1.47848°W		Late 18th century	The public house and outbuildings are in gritstone with tile roofs, and they are arranged around a courtyard. The public house has a main range of two storeys and three bays, and a projecting single-storey rendered bay on the left. The main range has a chamfered plinth, and three canted bay windows. Above is a continuous canopy stepped to a gable over the doorway that has a segmental head and a moulded surround. The upper floor has applied timber forming, and contains two sash windows and a casement window. The outbuildings form an L-shaped plan with two storeys, and the openings include doorways with massive jambs and lintels, mullioned windows, and a cart entry with a segmental head and a keystone.	II
Tramway Embankment; 53.07380°N 1.46657°W		1793	The embankment is a remaining part of the Fritchley tram road, and is 70 metres (230 ft) long. It has stone side walls and parapets, with projecting through-stones and edge-bedded irregular coping stones.	II
Whatstandwell Bridge; 53.08554°N 1.50705°W		1796	The bridge carries Derby Road (A6 road) over the River Derwent. It is in gritstone and consists of three semicircular arches. The bridge has semicircular cutwaters with domed tops, from which rise pilaster strips, and broad bands to the arch heads, over which is a parapet.	II
Canal Cottages; 53.06457°N 1.48700°W		c. 1800	The cottages are in gritstone with roofs of Welsh slate and stone slate. The central range has three storeys and two bays, and the flanking ranges are lower. The doorways have plain surrounds, and the windows are casements.	II
Cliff Inn; 53.08975°N 1.48747°W		c. 1800	The public house is in gritstone, with quoins, and a Welsh slate roof with coped gables and plain kneelers. There are three storeys and an L-shaped plan, with a front range of three bays, and a two-storey rear wing. In the centre is a doorway with a quoined surround and a shallow moulded bracketed hood, and the windows are sashes.	II
Woodbank House; 53.07561°N 1.47709°W	—	c. 1800	A gritstone house on a plinth, with a moulded eaves band, and a stone slate roof with coped gables, moulded kneelers, and ball finials. There are two storeys and a T-shaped plan, with a front range of three bays, a rear wing, and later additions in the angle. The central doorway has a quoined surround, a massive lintel, and a shallow bracketed hood, and the windows are sashes.	II
Framework Knitting Workshop; 53.08749°N 1.49736°W	—	Early 19th century	The former workshop is in gritstone, with a sill band, an eaves band, and a tile roof with coped gables. There is a single storey, and the openings, which included windows, and two doorways, one with a chamfered quoined surround, are blocked.	II
Milepost; 53.08267°N 1.47854°W		Early 19th century	The milepost near the former Rising Sun public house is in cast iron and has a diamond section on a short circular shaft. It is inscribed with the distances to Nottingham, Ripley, and Cromford (the names abbreviated).	II
Congregational Chapel; 53.07253°N 1.46744°W		1841	The chapel is in gritstone with quoins and a hipped slate roof. The entrance front has three bays, and a pediment with a moulded cornice and coping, containing an inscribed and dated plaque. In the centre is a doorway with a semicircular head, flanked by blind round-headed recesses with impost blocks and keystones. Along the sides are three bays, each containing a tall round-headed window.	II
Portal, Stephenson's Tunnel; 53.08218°N 1.47957°W		1841	The tunnel was built by George Stephenson for his tramway. The portal is set against a rock outcrop and is in gritstone. It consists of a semicircular arch formed by voussoirs, and is on a projecting plinth. The opening has been infilled.	II
Tramway Bridge; 53.08451°N 1.48107°W		1841	The overbridge was built by George Stephenson to carry his tramway. It is in gritstone, and consists of a single semicircular arch with a moulded surround and a low parapet. At each end are sloped curving abutment walls with flat copings.	II
Former Primitive Methodist Chapel; 53.08267°N 1.47898°W	—	1853	The chapel, later used for other purposes, is in gritstone with a tile roof and two storeys. The central doorway has a semicircular fanlight. The doorway and the windows have semicircular heads with impost blocks and keystones.	II
Chase Cliffe; 53.07937°N 1.49134°W		1859–61	A small country house designed by Benjamin Ferrey, in gritstone, with quoins, and stone slate roofs with coped gables, moulded kneelers, and ball finials. There are two storeys and attics, and an irregular T-shaped plan. The main doorway has a moulded surround, a segmental pointed arch, and a hood mould, above which is a canted oriel window with a parapet. Most of the other windows are mullioned and transomed, and there are gabled dormers.	II
Lodge, gate piers and walls, Chase Cliffe; 53.08016°N 1.49129°W	—	c. 1870	The lodge is in gritstone on a chamfered plinth, and has a stone slate roof with coped gables, moulded kneelers, and ball finials. There is a single storey and an L-shaped plan, with a gabled porch in the angle that has a pointed arch, and a doorway with a chamfered surround. The west front has two bays, a gable on the west side surmounted by a statue of a deer, and a mullioned and transomed window. The boundary walls are curved, and the entrance is flanked by gate piers.	II
Stable block, trough and mounting block, Chase Cliffe Farm; 53.08007°N 1.49092°W	—	c. 1870	The stable block is in gritstone, with a chamfered eaves band, and stone slate roofs with coped gables and moulded kneelers. There is a U-shaped plan around a courtyard, the central range with one storey and lofts, and the wings with one storey. The central range has two segmental-arched carriage entrances with quoined surrounds, a mullioned window, a segmental-arched doorway with a keystone and an inscribed tablet, and three gabled dormers. In the courtyard are a semicircular trough and a mounting block.	II
Village cross 53.08636°N 1.47883°W		1871	The cross, replacing an earlier one on the site, on the earlier three steps. It has a square base, a tapering shaft, and a wheel head cross with foliage decoration on the west face and a carved figure on the east side.	II
Penfold Post Box; 53.08998°N 1.48579°W		1872–79	The penfold pillar box in the National Tramway Museum was designed by John Wornham Penfold. It is in cast iron and has a hexagonal plan on a moulded plinth. On the front is a plate and a posting slot, and a moulded and slightly domed top with leaf decoration.	II
Thurlowbooth Cottages; 53.07946°N 1.49353°W	—	Late 19th century	A stepped terrace of eight cottages, later combined into four, in gritstone with Welsh slate roofs. There are two storeys, each original cottage had one bay, a doorway with a massive surround, and mullioned windows; some doorways have been converted into windows.	II
Crich Baptist Chapel; 53.08357°N 1.47931°W		1877	The chapel is in gritstone, with quoins, and a roof of Staffordshire blue tile with coped gables. There are two storeys, and the entrance front has three bays, over which is a frieze, a cornice, and a modillion pediment containing a clock face. On the front are two wide bands between moulded string courses, the lower with a roundel and inscribed names, and the upper with an inscribed tablet. The central doorway and the windows all have quoined surrounds, semicircular heads and curved hood moulds; the middle window in the top floor is tripartite. The doorway also has circular columns with foliage capitals.	II
K1 Telephone Box; 53.08957°N 1.48614°W		1921	The K1 telephone box is in the National Tramway Museum. It is in concrete and iron, and has a square plan and a wooden door. On each side is a six-pane window, and on the top are projecting eaves and a curved roof. On the roof is an enamelled sign on each side inscribed "TELEPHONE", curly iron embellishments and a spearhead finial.	II
Crich Stand; 53.09445°N 1.48791°W		1922–23	The building is a tower is on Crich Hill, it is a memorial to the Sherwood Foresters regiment, and it contains fabric from earlier towers on the site. It is in gritstone on a square coped sandstone platform with a wrought iron enclosure. The tower is circular, and at the top is an arcaded lantern with fluted Doric columns, a circular stone frieze, and a cornice beneath a dome with a flaming finial. At the base of the tower is a doorway with an inscribed lintel and a pediment with a bronze wreath, over which is the regimental insignia of the Sherwood Foresters and dates. Also on the tower are bronze plaques with inscriptions relating to the two World Wars and subsequent conflicts.	II*
Metropolitan Police Public Call Post; 53.09111°N 1.48671°W		c. 1925	The Metropolitan Police public call post in the National Tramway Museum is in cast iron. It has a square plan, and a segmental domed top on which is a blue light. The sides are panelled, and on the front is a door above which is a panel inscribed "POLICE PUBLIC CALL POST", and a crown flanked by "M" and "P".	II
Metropolitan Police Box; 53.08963°N 1.48574°W		1930–37	The Mark 2 Metropolitan police box, designed by Gilbert Mackenzie Trench, is in the National Tramway Museum. It is in pre-cast concrete with a square plan. Each face is identical, there is a doorway in the east face, and on the roof is a blue light.	II
K6 telephone kiosk 53.07218°N 1.46778°W		1935	The K6 type telephone kiosk in Fritchley Green was designed by Giles Gilbert Scott. Constructed in cast iron with a square plan and a dome, it has three unperforated crowns in the top panels.	II
