= Chase Cliffe =

Coordinates: 53.0794°N 1.4912°W

Chase Cliffe House
- Garden elevation of the house from the south.
- Interactive map of the Chase Cliffe House area

General information
- Type: Country house
- Architectural style: Gothic Revival
- Location: near Whatstandwell, Derbyshire, England
- Construction started: 1859
- Completed: 1861
- Client: The Hurt Family

Design and construction
- Architect: Benjamin Ferrey

Chase Cliffe is a building situated between the villages of Whatstandwell and Crich in Derbyshire. The house was built in 1859 by the three sisters of then deceased Francis Hurt.

== History ==
In 1854, Francis Hurt died and his three unmarried sisters had to leave Alderwasley Hall to make space for his male heir. Upon the death of Hurt, the sisters were paid large sums to guarantee their financial independence, and in 1859 they started construction on a country home near Crich, Derbyshire. This house was built on the site of "Hob Hall", a house of which little is known. Benjamin Ferrey was consulted as architect, and the house was built to an irregular T plan of regular coursed gritstone and ashlar dressings. The house is mainly of two storeys with gabled dormers to the attics. The southern elevation has an open four-bay arcade with segmental arches from octagonal piers. Constructed started in 1859, and the main house was complete by 1861. The house now carries Grade II listing, having been designated on 14 August 1985.

In 1870, work was made on the construction of a lodge and stable block built from regular coursed gritstone to match the house. A lodge has a statue of a deer mounted upon its gable. The entire estate is flanked by stone walls of 1.5 metres height. These also carry Grade II listing.

The three sisters were great benefactors to Crich parish and donated three stone seats for parishioners to rest on the way to St Mary's Church. Two still exist; however, one of these is covered in vegetation. The sisters paid for the construction of the Fritchley National School, church improvements and a community nurse.

== See also ==
- Listed buildings in Crich
