= Stodhart Tunnel =

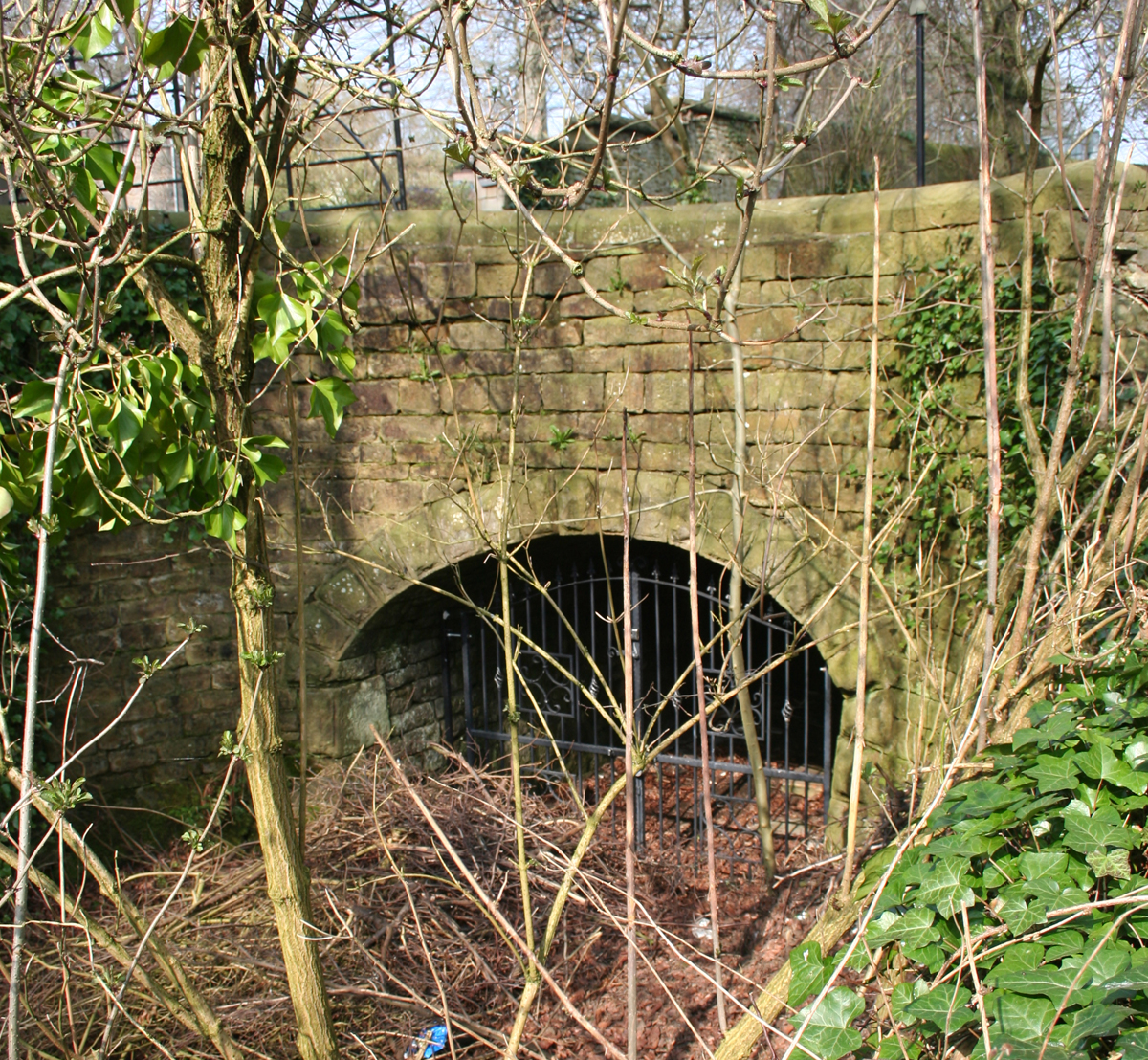
- Stodhart Tunnel portal in 2012

- Location within Derbyshire
- 53.332°N 1.917°W
- Location: Chapel Milton, Derbyshire, England
- OS grid reference: SK0588081490

History
- Built: 1796

Site notes
- Architect: Benjamin Outram

Listed Building – Grade II*
- Official name: Stodhart Tunnel
- Designated: 3 September 1985
- Reference no.: 1334843

Stodhart Tunnel is a 100-yard (91 m) tunnel on the Peak Forest Tramway at Chapel Milton, Derbyshire. The tunnel stretches under the Chapel-en-le-Firth to Glossop Road. Although one side has been blocked up, it remains one of the oldest rail-related tunnels in the world and was also the site of one of the earliest rail-related accidents, when a laden carriage rolled into two horses, killing them.

== History ==
The tunnel was built in 1796 for the Peak Forest Tramway. Designed by Benjamin Outram, it was built out of gritstone with ashlar coping. Originally considered as an open cutting, it was designed in the style of canal tunnels, so as to not disturb the owners of the nearby Stodhart Lodge. It ran for about 100 yards (91 m) under the road between Chapel-en-le-Frith and Glossop, as a single track route. It remained a single-track route when the rest of the tramway was doubled, becoming a bottleneck on the line. The tunnel is also the site of one of the earliest railway accidents: six laden wagons broke free from their horses and rolled back into a following team, killing both horses and injuring an apprentice.

One side of the tunnel was filled in during road realignment in 1949, so it is only accessible from the other side. The tunnel was designated a grade II* listed building on 3 September 1985 and is on the Buildings at Risk Register. From the 1950s part of the tunnel and about 1/2 mi (0.80 km) of track was tar sealed and used to test Ferodo brakes. The tunnel was used to test the effect of humidity on brakes. Until May 2013, it was considered to be the earliest rail-related tunnel in the world, but is now believed to be pre-dated by Fritchley Tunnel on the Butterley Gangroad at Fritchley, also in Derbyshire.
