= Peak Forest Tramway =

Coordinates: 53.3354°N 1.9690°W

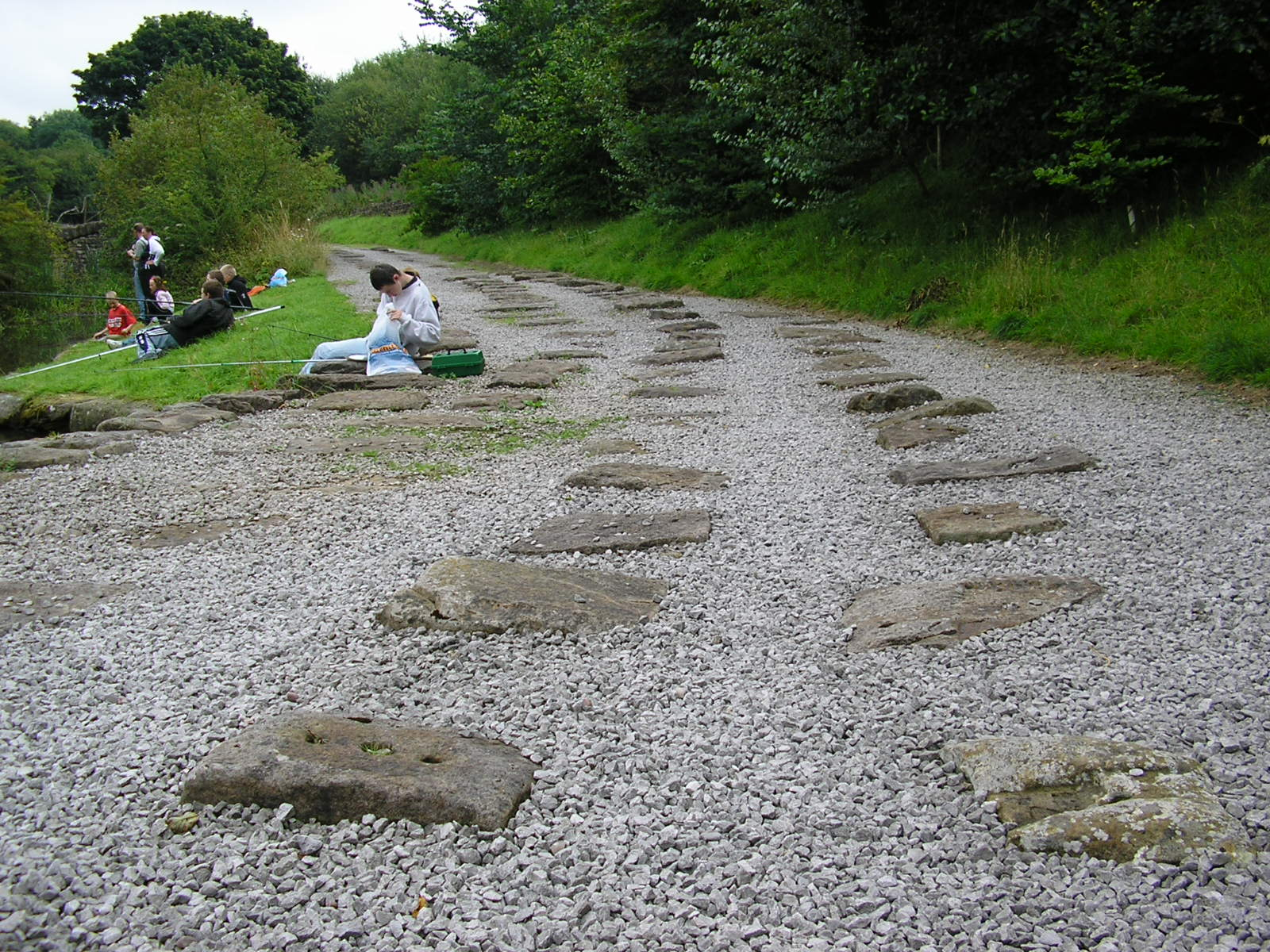
Sleeper blocks at Bugsworth Basin

Map of the Peak Forest Tramway and other railways (click to enlarge)

Peak Forest Tramway shown within Derbyshire
(grid reference SK049800)

The Peak Forest Tramway was an early horse- and gravity-powered industrial railway (or tramway) system in Derbyshire, England. Opened for trade on 31 August 1796, it remained in operation until the 1920s. Much of the route and the structures associated with the line remain. The western section of the line is now the route of the Peak Forest Tramway Trail.

The tramway was originally planned to be about 4 miles (6 kilometres) long from Chapel Milton to Dove Holes. However, it was decided to start the tramway at Bugsworth (now called Buxworth) and, as built, it was about 6 miles (10 kilometres) long. Its purpose was to carry limestone from the vast quarries around Dove Holes down to Bugsworth Basin via Chapel-en-le-Frith and Chinley, where much of it was taken by boat along the Peak Forest Canal and the Ashton Canal to Manchester and beyond. The remaining limestone was put into lime kilns at Bugsworth where it was converted into quick lime (or burnt lime).

== Construction ==
Built by Benjamin Outram, the tramway was initially single-track, on a 4 ft 2 in (1,270 mm) gauge, constructed of stone sleeper blocks and L-section cast-iron rails that were fastened directly onto the blocks, in the same manner as his Little Eaton Gangway built for the Derby Canal. The rails, known as gang rails or plates, were provided by Benjamin Outram and Company who also supplied the mineral wagons.

From Bugsworth it rose 129 feet (39 m) to Whitehough, then proceeded to Chapel Milton on the level. It then climbed 56½ to the base of the inclined plane, which took the line upwards 192 feet (59 m) over a distance of 512 yards (468 m). After a more gentle slope to Barmoor Clough the line proceeded to the Dove Holes quarries.

To aid acceleration from the top, and braking at the foot, the inclined plane varied from 1 in 6 at the top to 1 in 12 at the base. It was intended to be, at least partly, self-acting with descending wagons counterbalanced to some extent by partly loaded wagons being drawn up. Initially rope was tried, followed by a patent twisted chain, passing round a wheel, with a brake to control it, in a pit at the top. Eventually a chain with 5-inch (130 mm) links was purchased from Birmingham, which proved more equal to the work. By the beginning of the 20th century this had been replaced by a steel rope.

There was another small incline of 33 yards (30 m) within the quarry complex worked by a horse-gin at the top and a continuous rope.

The mineral wagons were originally similar to those used for the earlier Little Eaton Gangway, with a substantial wooden chassis with a wrought-iron body held in place by two wooden wedges. The axles were bolted onto axle trees and the cast-iron wheels (about 20 inches in diameter) were held on the axles by a linchpin (known as a "lily-pin"). Later the bodies were fixed with a door at the back, unloading by means of a tippler mechanism mounted on a turntable. Each waggon carried between 2 and 2.5 long tons (2.24 and 2.80 short tons; 2.03 and 2.54 t) of limestone.

From the bottom of the plane to Bugsworth Basin, a team of four horses could draw up to twenty wagons. The ganger and nipper (apprentice), controlling a gang of waggons, rode on the axles and kept the speed at 4 to 6 miles per hour (6.4 to 9.7 km/h) by spragging the wheels to make them skid.

== History ==
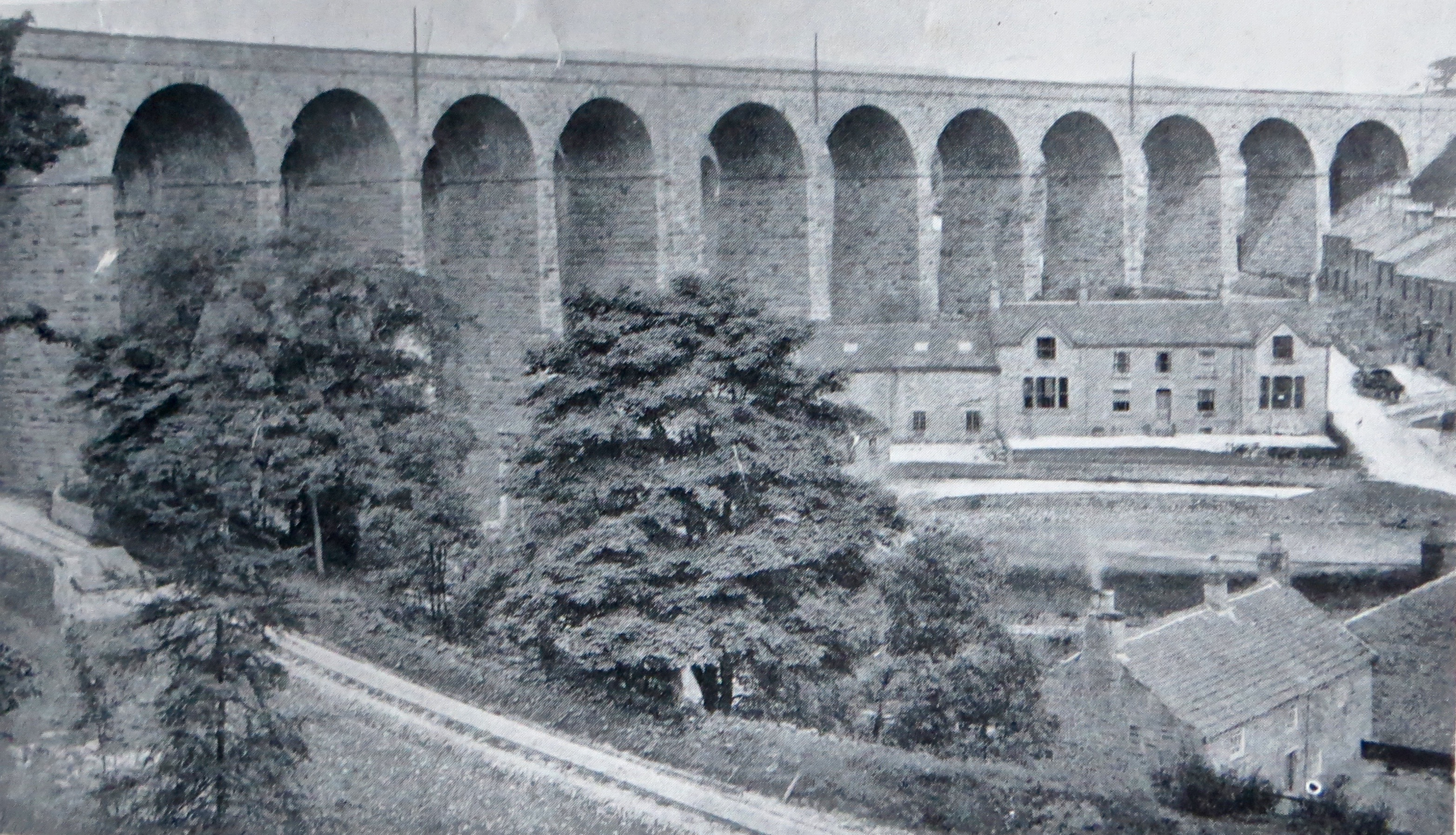
Chapel Milton viaduct, c. 1900, with Peak Forest Tramway in left foreground

In 1803 the tramway was made double-track, with the exception of Stodhart Tunnel and below Buxton Road Bridge, using the same method of fixing the rails.

Problems were experienced because the rails became loose, and to overcome these the main line was relaid between 1832 and 1837 using pedestals or saddles placed between the rails and the stone sleeper blocks. Over the years the design of the rails and saddles underwent many modifications and in circa 1865 much of the main line was replaced by L-section steel rails 9 and 12 feet (3.7 m) long rolled at the Gorton Works (Gorton Tank) of the Manchester, Sheffield and Lincolnshire Railway Company.

In 1846 the MSLR's predecessor, the Sheffield, Ashton-under-Lyne and Manchester Railway, took on a £9,325 a year (equivalent to £1,140,000 in 2023) perpetual lease of the Peak Forest Canal, including the tramway. The railway became owner of the canal in 1883. The tramway closed in 1920 and its rails and waggons were sold by the LNER.

The most important surviving features of the tramway are the elevated tramway branch at Bugsworth Basin, Stodhart Tunnel and the self-acting inclined plane at Chapel-en-le-Frith, known as the Chapel inclined plane. The elevated tramway branch forms part of the scheduled monument of Bugsworth Basin. It was believed that the Grade II* listed Stodhart Tunnel was the oldest railway tunnel in the world until archaeological work on the Butterley Gangroad (also in Derbyshire) in May 2013 suggested that Fritchley Tunnel on that line was older than Stodhart Tunnel. A wagon is on display in the York Railway Museum and a wheel and track items at the Narrow Gauge Railway Museum.
