= IWPS =

IWPS may refer to:

- Institute of War and Peace Studies, an American research center created in 1951 until a name alteration in 2003
- Inland Waterways Protection Society, a British organisation founded in 1958 to work for the restoration of the canal system
- Individual World Poetry Slam, an annual poetry slam tournament held since 2004
