= St James' Church, Buxworth =

St. James; Church, Buxworth
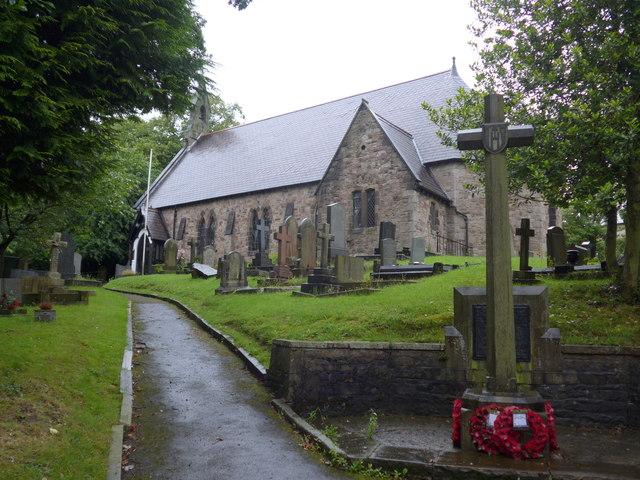
- St. James; Church, Buxworth
- St. James; Church, Buxworth
- 53.336111°N 1.970350°W
- Location: Buxworth, Derbyshire
- Country: England
- Denomination: Church of England

History
- Dedication: St. James

Architecture
- Heritage designation: Grade II
- Designated: 12 April 1984
- Architect: J Lowe
- Completed: 1874

Administration
- Diocese: Chinley with Buxworth

St. James' Church, Buxworth is a 19th-century Church of England church in the village of Buxworth, Derbyshire. The church dates back to 1874 and is a Grade II listed building.

== See also ==
- Listed buildings in Chinley, Buxworth and Brownside
