= Buxworth =

Village in Derbyshire, England

Coordinates: 53.337°N 1.970°W

Buxworth: Bugsworth, Buggy
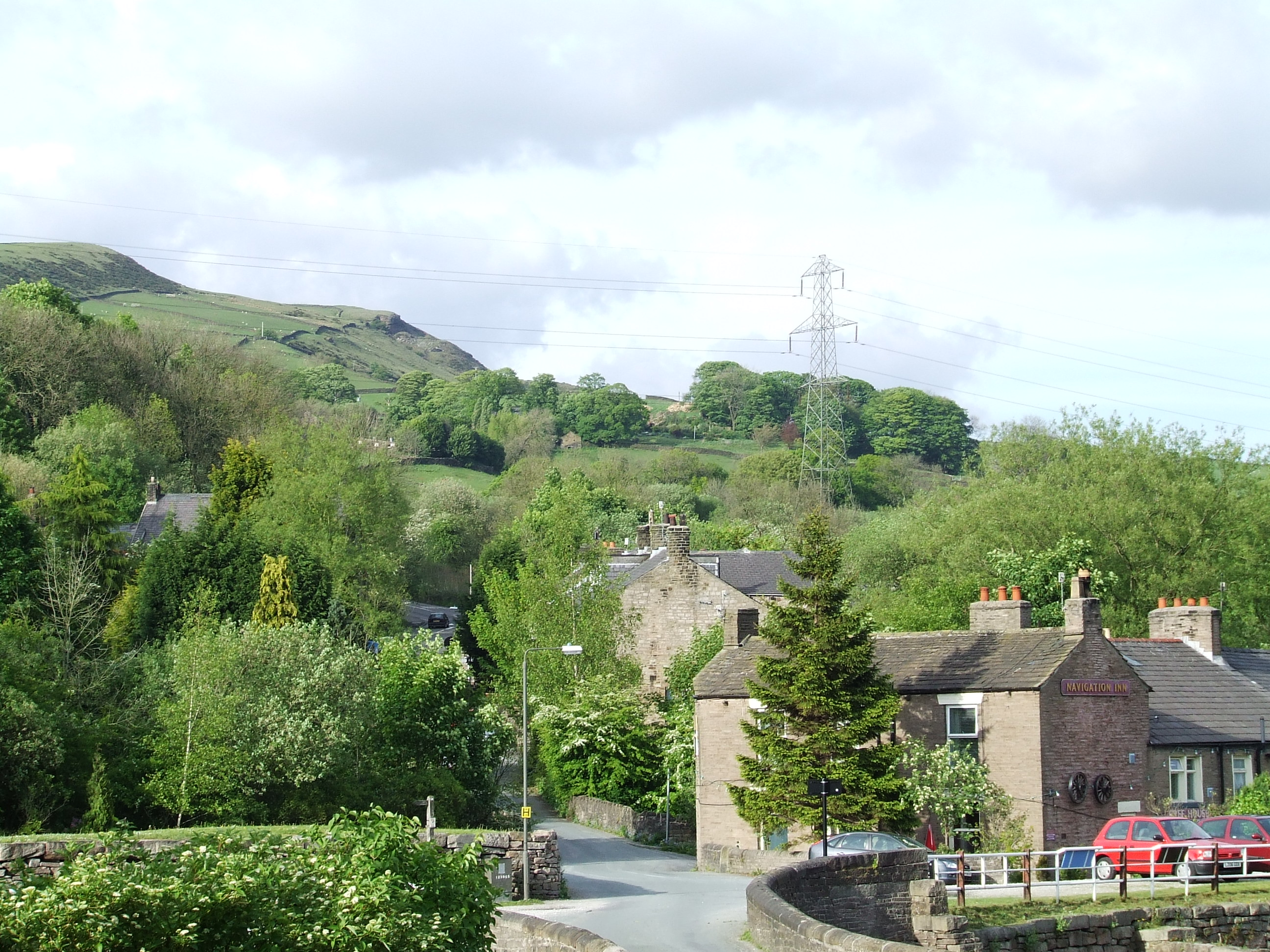
- Buxworth showing the 'Navigation Inn'

- Location within Derbyshire
- OS grid reference: SK0282
- Civil parish: Chinley, Buxworth and Brownside
- District: High Peak
- Shire county: Derbyshire
- Region: East Midlands
- Country: England
- Sovereign state: United Kingdom
- Post town: HIGH PEAK
- Postcode district: SK23
- Dialling code: 01663
- Police: Derbyshire
- Fire: Derbyshire
- Ambulance: East Midlands
- UK Parliament: High Peak

Buxworth is a village in the High Peak of Derbyshire, England. The area, which was once an important centre for the limestone industry, became the terminus of the Peak Forest Canal. Its pub, the Navigation Inn, was once owned by Coronation Street actress Pat Phoenix.

The village lies almost 2 miles (3.2 km) from Whaley Bridge and about 18 miles (29 km) southeast of Manchester.

== Name change ==
The village was originally called Bugsworth, from the Old English Bucga's Worth ("Bucga's Enclosure"), but in the early 20th century some residents began to dislike the name of their village; their cause was championed by the local vicar, Dr J R Towers, and the village school headmaster, Mr W T Prescott. As a result of the efforts of these two residents, Bugsworth officially became Buxworth on 16 April 1930.

In 1999 the local High Peak Borough Council spent £350 to organise a ballot of the 600 members of the local population. The result was 233 to 139 to keep the name as Buxworth. However, the village is still generally referred to as 'Buggy' by locals.

== Transport ==
The Peak Forest Canal terminates here at Bugsworth Basin (the renaming of the village had no effect on the name of the canal basin), which was re-opened on 26 March 2005 having been restored by the Inland Waterways Protection Society, and, once again, the canal now ends at its original terminus. It is used entirely for recreational purposes.

The canal never reached Peak Forest but limestone from quarries near Dove Holes was, between 1796 and 1922, transported to the basin by way of the Peak Forest Tramway – a distance of some six miles. Its trackbed can still be discerned in places (e.g. at Whitehough, close to Chinley, and just beyond the end of the bypass on the way south to Buxton).

A main railway line (Sheffield to Manchester) passes north of the village. The railway was originally the Midland Railway's main line to London, built in 1867 as part of the extension of its Manchester, Buxton, Matlock and Midlands Junction Railway, and in 1894 the Midland built the line from Dore, which today is the Hope Valley Line. Almost as soon as it was built a landslip destroyed the viaduct. Some four hundred men made drainage channels and built a new timber viaduct, which served until 1885 when the present one was built. A tunnel to the north of the station collapsed during building, trapping a gang of navvies, who were close to death by the time they were rescued. In 1903, when the line upgraded to four tracks, the tunnel was opened out into a cutting.

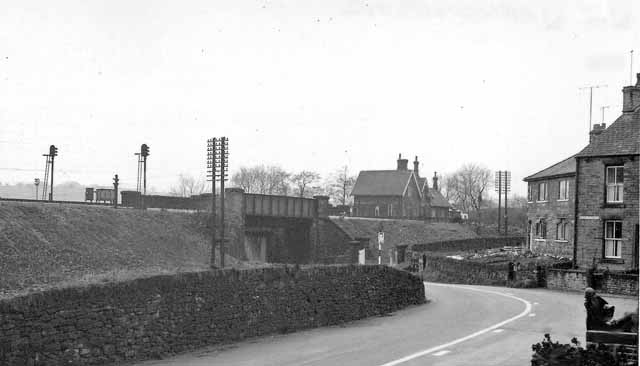
Buxworth station seen from the road

There was a station at Buxworth, also originally called Bugsworth, renamed on 4 June 1930, seven weeks after the village was renamed. This closed on 15 September 1958, but the building and parts of the platforms remain to this day. All through the station's existence it has experienced a peculiar anomaly in that reconstructing the collapsed viaduct also involved realigning the railway line a little way to the north. As a result, the tracks have always run past the "wrong side" of the station building, where the approach road was originally intended to be, with a new approach road hastily laid where the tracks were originally supposed to be. The old station house is owned by Burnage School For Boys in Manchester and is opened for visits frequently.

The village is split into two by the Whaley Bridge–Chapel-en-le-Frith bypass (A6), constructed in the 1980s.

== Local murder ==
John Cotton, the last man to be hanged in Derby Gaol in 1898, murdered his wife in Bugsworth basin after drinking heavily in the Rose & Crown (now demolished) at Bugsworth.

== School ==
Buxworth Primary School, founded in 1884, is the only school remaining in Buxworth. The school is currently headed by Paul Bertram and was previously co-headed by Jennifer Rackstraw and Louise Moore. Their current Ofsted rating is 'Good'.

== Sport ==
Buxworth cricket team, which was founded around 1848, play in the Derbyshire & Cheshire League. Former Buxworth player Alan (Bud) Hill went on to play for Derbyshire for over fourteen seasons, scoring more than 12,000 first-class runs at an average of 30.89.

Buxworth Football Club, nicknamed the Canal Men, play in the Premier division of the Hope Valley Amateur League with Buxworth Reserves competing in the Premier Division.

== Links with the United States ==
Brierley Green adjoins Buxworth and in the early 19th century it was the home of the Clayton family. The eldest son, Joel Henry Clayton, emigrated to the US to live with an uncle at Pittsburgh, Pennsylvania. Other members of the Clayton family followed him and eventually they settled in a valley at the foot of Mount Diablo, some 30 miles from San Francisco, California where they founded Clayton. Buxworth and Clayton are now twinned.

== See also ==
- Listed buildings in Chinley, Buxworth and Brownside
