= Chapel inclined plane =

Railway segment in Derbyshire, England

Coordinates: 53.3218°N 1.9009°W

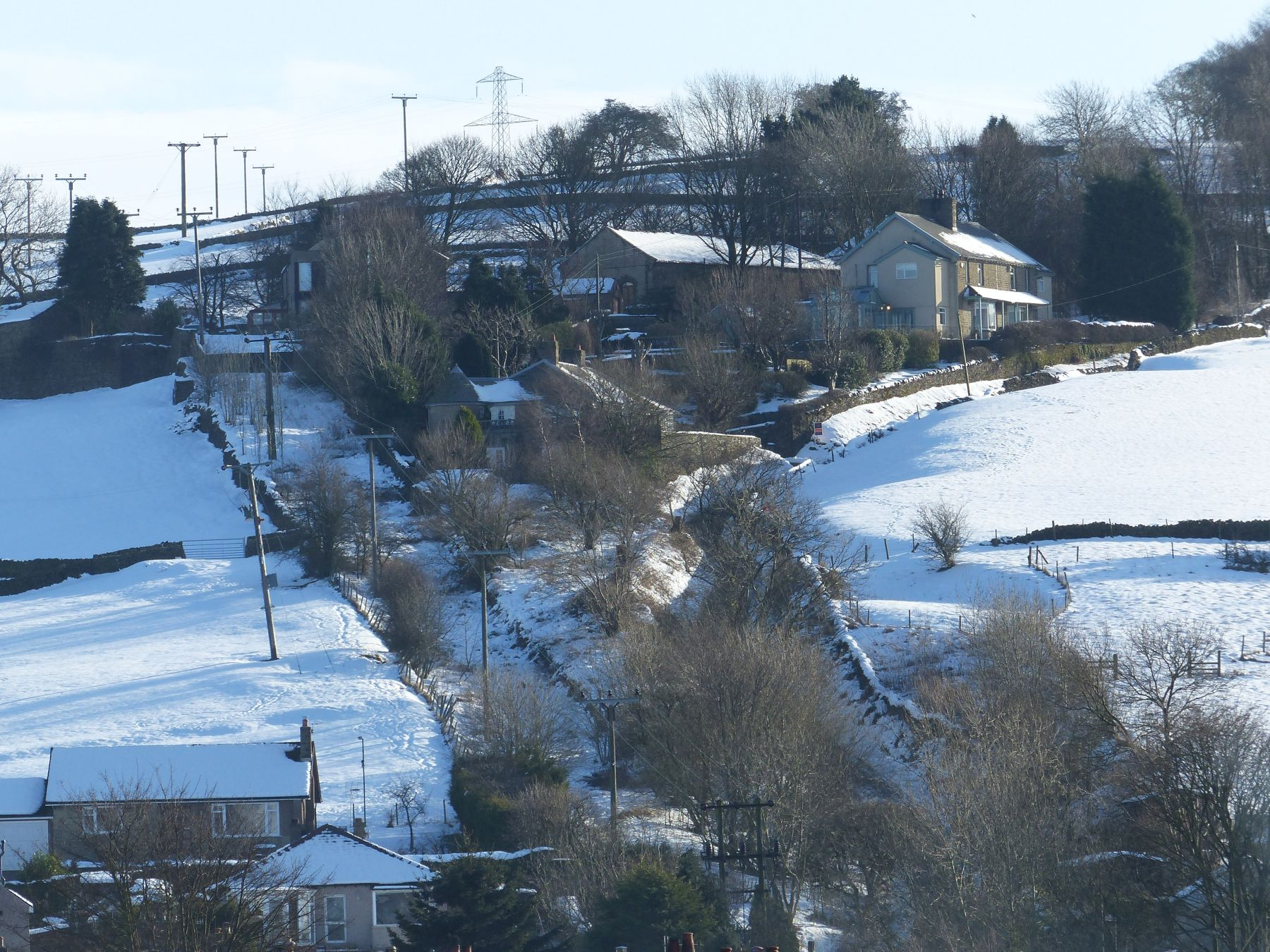
A section of the Chapel Inclined Plane is visible to the left of this photograph, now followed by power lines.

The Chapel Inclined Plane is an inclined plane immediately to the south of Chapel-en-le-Frith, High Peak, Derbyshire. The ground here rises sharply and the inclined plane was built to connect the lower and upper levels of the Peak Forest Tramway, which was built and initially operated by the Peak Forest Canal Company. It opened for trade on 31 August 1796.

== Operating principle ==
At this point the ground rises by 209 feet (64 m) and the operating principle of the plane was that it was self-acting and loaded waggons descending under the action of gravity hauled empty waggons up it. A maximum of eight loaded waggons were permitted to descend the plane at any one time. The net (or tare) weight of a mineral waggon was between 16 and 20 long hundredweight (810 and 1,020 kg) and it could carry about 2½ tons. Thus the gross weight of a gang of eight waggons descending the plane was about 22 to 28 tons. Chains coupled the waggons to each other and the waggon at the rear was coupled to the incline chain/rope. In Derbyshire, the workman who made the coupling to the incline chain/rope was generally known as a "hanger-on" and he connected two special chains to the rear waggon, which he then plaited around the incline chain/rope and fastened them off with leather thongs. It was found that plaiting these chains in place had the effect of tightening their grip once the waggons were in motion on the plane. It is known that these chains were sometimes made with progressively smaller links, which also had the effect of tightening the grip but it is not known whether chains of this type were used on this plane.

=== Speed control ===
As the waggons moved on the plane, the weight of the chain/rope increased on the descending side and decreased on the ascending side. Thus, it was essential to keep waggons under control once they were in motion and this was accomplished in three ways.

1. By the skilful design of the inclined plane itself, for which full credit must be given to Thomas Brown, the surveyor and resident engineer. It was designed in such a way that the gradient at the top (1:6¼) was greater than the gradient at the bottom (1:8¼). The effect of this was twofold: it reduced the action of gravity as the waggons approached the top and bottom respectively and it offset the changing weight of the incline chain/rope.
2. By a band brake, integral with a chain/rope drum, installed at the top. A brakeman working in a wooden tower above the 18 ft (5.5 m) diameter drum controlled this brake and from his elevated position he had a commanding view of the inclined plane.
3. By the friction between the chain/rope and support blocks/rollers placed between the rails.

=== Safety catches ===
In the event of an accident, three catches were provided towards the top of the plane to stop runaway waggons but their method of operation is unknown and it is not known how effective they were. The two running tracks on the plane were laid parallel to each other and this makes it evident that a gravel drag was not provided for runaway waggons to enter. On several occasions reports of chain/cable breakage were recorded and descending loaded waggons crashed into Buxton Road Bridge at the foot of the plane.

=== Signalling ===
An iron post, incorporating a red and white disc and bell signal, was positioned between the running tracks at the bottom of the plane and when everything was ready a signal was given to the brakeman, the bell being used when it was misty or dark. When the brakeman was also satisfied that everything was ready at the top, he released the brake and the descending waggons were pushed onto the plane. As the descending waggons approached the bottom the reduced gradient slowed them down and simultaneously this action was assisted by the increased gradient encountered by ascending waggons as they approached the top. When the brakeman was assured that the waggons had completed the full traverse of the plane, he stopped them by fully applying the brake.

=== Band brake ===
At the top of the plane the incline chain/rope passed underground and into a pit where it was wound one and a half turns around a horizontal drum 14 feet (4.3 m) in diameter. The groove in the drum for the chain/rope was lined with wooden blocks with the grain facing outwards to increase the friction. Above this groove there was an integral brake wheel about 5 inches (13 cm) wide. A wrought iron (or steel) band brake encircled this, which almost made a 360° arc of contact with the brake wheel, and this was lined with wooden blocks with the grain facing inwards to increase the friction. The band brake was anchored to the back wall of the pit and at the front, one end was cranked upwards and the other end was cranked downwards. The upward crank was attached above the fulcrum of the brake lever and the downward crank was attached below the fulcrum. The brake lever was about 15 feet (4.6 m) long and it extended into the hut at the top of the tower. In spite of the large mechanical advantage provided by the brake lever, the brakeman was unable to apply the brake unaided. To further increase the mechanical advantage, a pulley block was fitted to the lever and the brakeman used this to apply the brake.

=== Rope or chain ===
When the tramway opened in 1796, a hemp rope was used on the incline but it was found that this was too weak and a wrought-iron chain soon replaced it. This also proved not to be strong enough and in 1809 it was replaced. The new chain had links 5 inches (130 mm) long and it was manufactured in Birmingham at a cost of £500. Records suggest that the chain was also replaced in 1817 and again in 1831. It was about 1,075 yards (983 m) long and weighed about 7 tons. With the development of the Bessemer steel making process during the 1860s, a steel rope eventually replaced the chain and this was 2 inches (51 mm) in diameter and weighed 6 tons (tonnes).

=== Rollers ===
At first, the chain/rope was supported and guided on the plane by wooden blocks placed between the rails every 10 yards (9.1 m) but it is known that steel rollers were fitted in the late 1860s or the 1870s as it became easier to manufacture steel. While the substantial drag between the chain/rope and the wooden blocks was put to beneficial use in the operation of the plane it must have been found that this was too great and rollers were substituted for blocks with the purpose of reducing drag.
