= Bugsworth Basin =

Canal basin in Derbyshire, England

Coordinates: 53.33490°N 1.96843°W

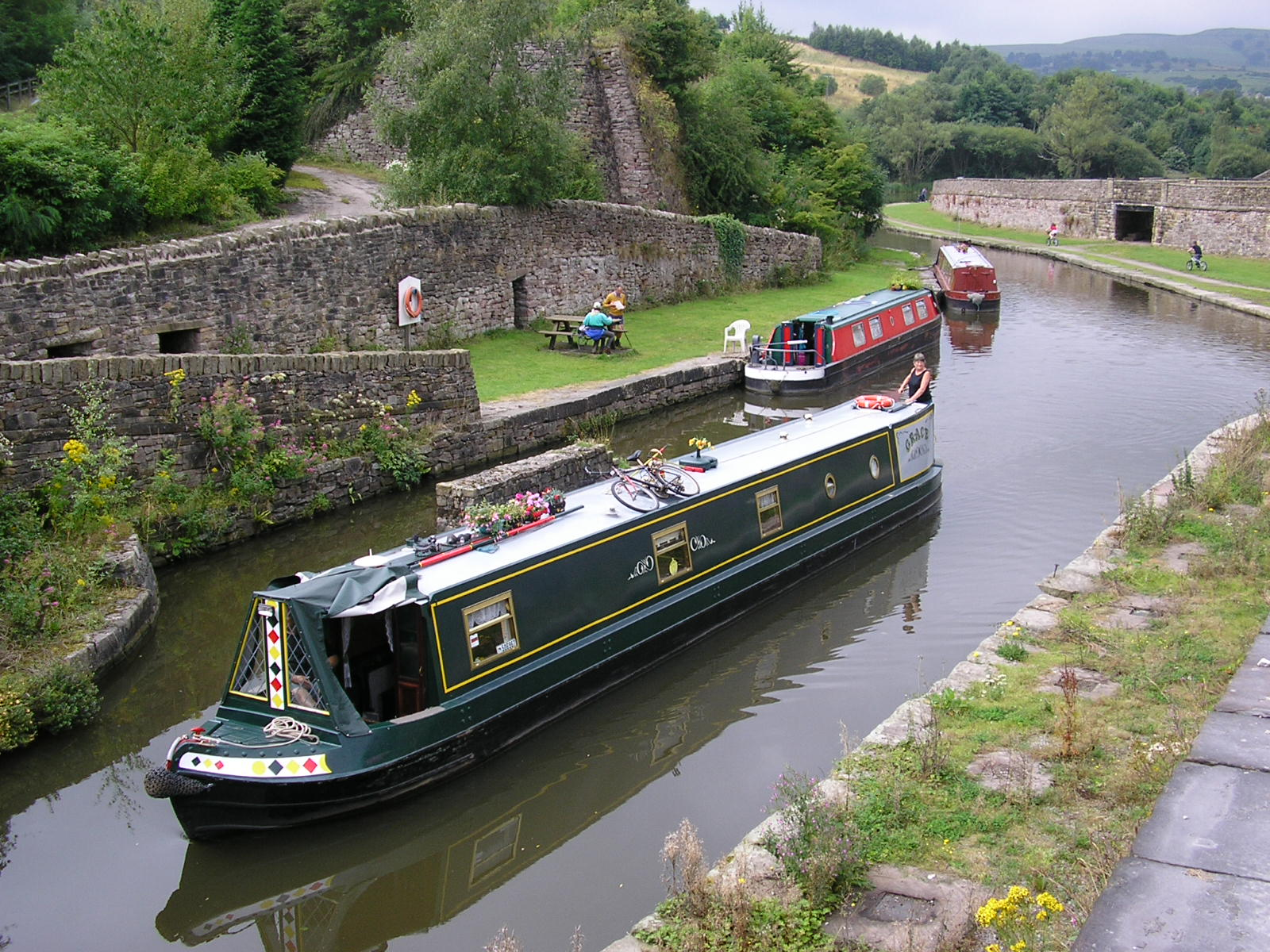
Part of the basin including the remains of the Gnats Hole lime kilns

Bugsworth Basin shown within Derbyshire
(grid reference SK022820)

Bugsworth Basin is a canal basin at the terminus of the Peak Forest Canal at Buxworth (formerly Bugsworth) in the valley of the Black Brook, close to Whaley Bridge. It was once a busy interchange with the Peak Forest Tramway, for the transport of limestone and burnt lime.

Work on the restoration of the derelict Bugsworth Basin, a scheduled monument since 1977, commenced in 1968. Volunteers of the Inland Waterways Protection Society (IWPS) helped by the Waterway Recovery Group (WRG) and many locals restored parts of this important site over three decades. The IWPS obtained a 50-year lease in 1992, which allowed them to restore, manage and operate the basin. Funding for the improvements came from British Waterways, the European Regional Development Fund and a Derelict Land Grant from Derbyshire County Council. The basin was reopened to boats at Easter 1999, and a significant increase in the use of the canal occurred. However, this was the first time that powered boats had used the basin, and the dry-stone walling with clay puddling deteriorated rapidly. Walls collapsed, there were several near breaches, and a breach resulted in the basin closing again in October 1999. British Waterways restored pedestrian access to the basin by carrying out emergency repairs.

In 2005 the basin reopened to boat traffic after a £1.2 million restoration, undertaken by British Waterways working with the IWPS. Work included sealing the bottom of the basin to stop leakage, stonework repair and environmental measures to conserve the site's protected water vole population. Although restoration and reopening of the basin has been achieved, waterways enthusiasts want to make future improvements and developments. These include an interpretative exhibition about Bugsworth's history and reopening part of the tramway.

Bugsworth Basin was officially reopened on 26 March 2005 when 94 narrowboats attended the opening ceremony. The opening was performed by Tom Levitt, the then member of parliament for High Peak.

The basin is on the fringe of the Peak District National Park and the purpose of the restoration was to develop this industrial heritage site as a tourist centre.

== See also ==
- Canals of Great Britain
- List of canal basins in Great Britain
- Listed buildings in Chinley, Buxworth and Brownside
