= Coddington, Derbyshire =

Place in Derbyshire, England

Coordinates: 53.090°N 1.494°W

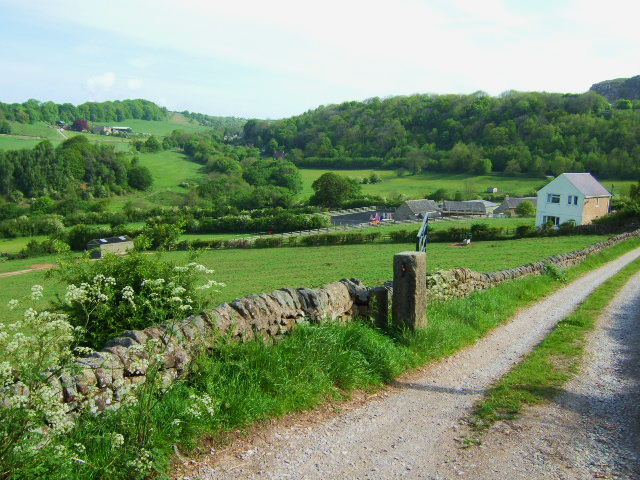
Coddington now

Coddington is a hamlet in the civil parish of Crich, in the Amber Valley district of Derbyshire, England. It is located ½ mile west of the village of Crich. According to the 1891 edition of Kelly's Directory there were two farms at Coddington.
