= Fritchley Tunnel =

Disused railway tunnel in Derbyshire, England

Coordinates: 53.07315°N 1.46629°W

Fritchley Tunnel is a disused railway tunnel at Fritchley in Derbyshire, England, which is believed to be the oldest surviving example in the world. The tunnel was constructed in 1793 by Benjamin Outram as part of the Butterley Gangroad, altered in the 1840s, and remained in use until the railway closed in 1933. It is a scheduled monument.

== History ==
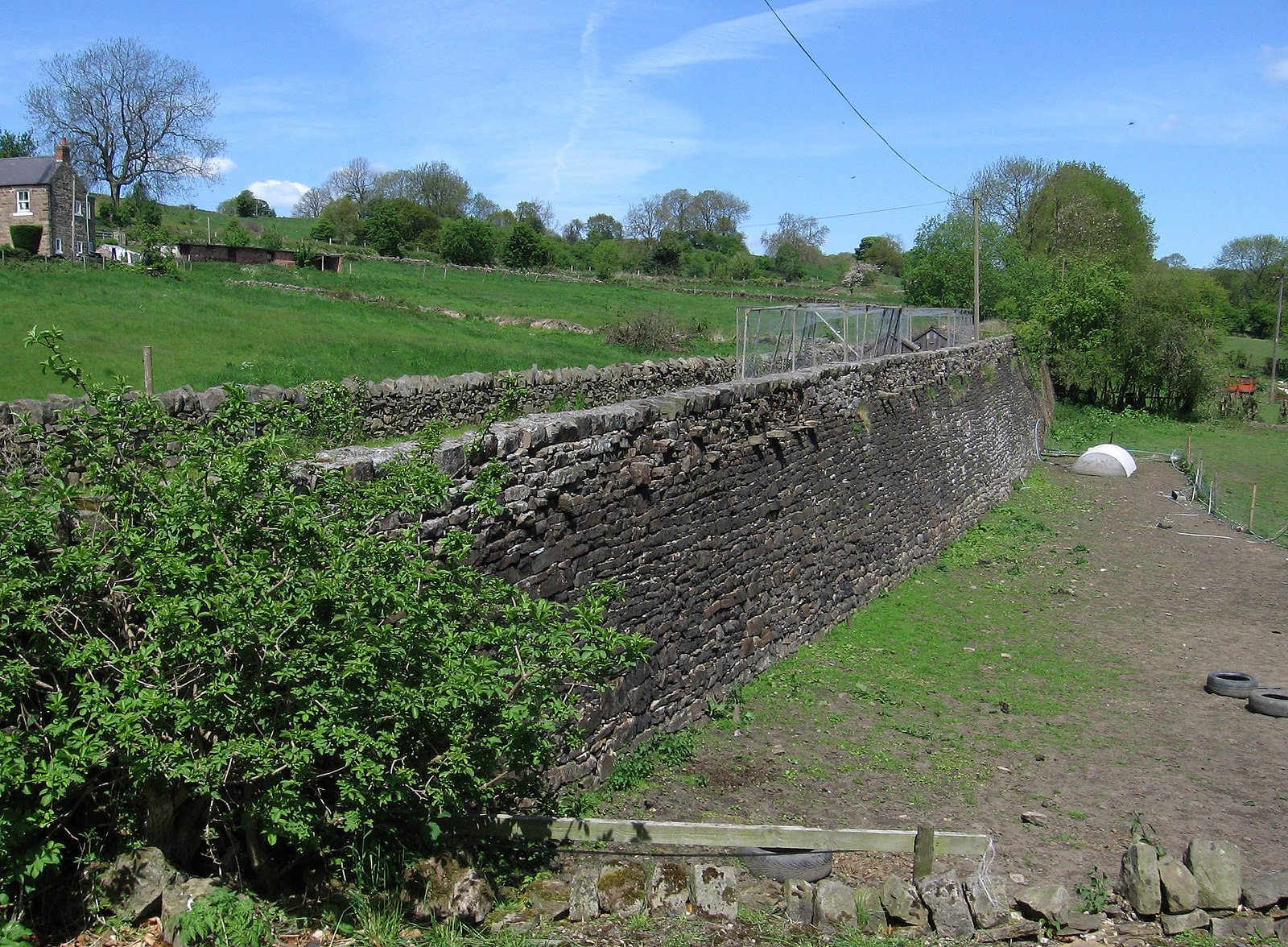
Tramway embankment at Bobbin Mill Hill

Butterley Gangroad linked Hilt's Quarry and other limestone quarries at Crich with the Cromford Canal at Bullbridge. The first railway project of Derbyshire civil engineer Benjamin Outram (1764–1805), the line was originally a horse-drawn and gravity-driven plateway, a form of tramway that Outram popularised. The line was constructed in 1793, with the tunnel being required to go under a road junction in Fritchley. In the 1840s, upgrading took place to accommodate steam locomotives, and part of the original line was moved. The southern part of the tunnel was rebuilt with an entrance slightly to the west of the original one. The tunnel's walls bear evidence of these changes. The railway remained in use until 1933.

During World War II, Fritchley Tunnel was used as an air raid shelter. The tunnel was sealed up in 1977, and by 1989 both entrances were buried. It was temporarily uncovered during archaeological work on the Butterley Gangroad by Derbyshire Archaeological Society in February 2013. In February 2015, the tunnel was designated a scheduled monument under the Ancient Monuments and Archaeological Areas Act 1979. The designation states that the tunnel is "recognised as the earliest surviving railway tunnel in the world and an important representation of tunnel engineering at this time."

== Description ==
The tunnel is located at the junction of Chapel Street with Bobbin Mill Hill and Front Street (SK3585553013), near to Riverside Cottage, in the village of Fritchley. It runs under Chapel Street in a broadly north–south direction for 22.58 metres (74 ft), with a height of 3.05 metres (10 ft). The tunnel is constructed from blocks of sandstone. A bend and joint in the stonework is located 15 metres (49 ft) from the northern end, which is believed to mark the end of the original (northern) section, dating from 1793. At the point where the two sections join, part of the north-east wall has been repaired or strengthened using brick. The roof is arched, with a circular cross section, and is supported on vertical sides.

The tunnel walls have gaps, believed to represent holes left by timbers used in building the arch. The north and south entrances have a semi-circular arch; the voussoirs are each constructed from one course of stone blocks. The northern entrance has a stone wall above it that forms a parapet beside Chapel Street. Both ends of the tunnel have been blocked; the northern end with soil, and the southern end with a modern red-brick structure on top of an older stone structure.

The interior of the tunnel is coated with soot and bears markings from sleepers. One surviving stone sleeper has been discovered immediately south of the tunnel, with an attached iron spike that was used to retain the rails. Near to the sleeper lies a soil path showing wear consistent with use by horses as a towpath.

The Grade-II-listed tramway embankment at Bobbin Mill Hill, also part of the tramway at Fritchley, lies 50 metres (164 ft) north of Fritchley Tunnel.

== See also ==
- Stodhart Tunnel – Derbyshire tunnel constructed in 1795
