= Listed buildings in Chinley, Buxworth and Brownside =

Chinley, Buxworth and Brownside is a civil parish in the High Peak district of Derbyshire, England. The parish contains 29 listed buildings that are recorded in the National Heritage List for England. Of these, one is listed at Grade II*, the middle of the three grades, and the others are at Grade II, the lowest grade. The parish contains settlements, including the villages of Chinley and Buxworth, and is otherwise rural. Most of the listed buildings are farmhouses and farm buildings, houses, cottages and associated structures. The Peak Forest Canal ends in the parish at Bugsworth Basin, and two listed buildings are associated with it. The other listed buildings consist of a church and two chapels, and a pair of railway viaducts.

== Key ==
Grade	Criteria
II*	Particularly important buildings of more than special interest
II	Buildings of national importance and special interest

== Buildings ==
Name and location	Photograph	Date	Notes	Grade
Bugsworth Hall; 53.33694°N 1.97013°W		1627	The house has been altered, enlarged, and divided. It is in gritstone with quoins and a slate roof. There are two storeys and attics, and five gables with bargeboards. The main doorway has a chamfered quoined surround, and a shouldered lintel with initials and the date. The windows are mullioned, some with hood moulds.	II
Old Farmhouse; 53.34906°N 1.97425°W		1640	The farmhouse is in gritstone with massive quoins and a stone slate roof. There are two storeys and four bays. On the front is a doorway with a chamfered quoined surround and a shouldered lintel with initials and the date, and to the south is a doorway with a quoined surround, an architrave, and a pointed head. Some windows are mullioned, and others are casements.	II
Chinley Head Farmhouse; 53.35809°N 1.92748°W	—	17th century	The farmhouse is in gritstone with large quoins and a stone slate roof. There are two storeys and a T-shaped plan. At the rear is a two-storey bay window, and a doorway with a chamfered and quoined surround. The windows are casements, some with hood moulds.	II
Cotebank; 53.34100°N 1.95715°W	—	17th century	This consists of the remains of an old hall, and a farmhouse dating from the 19th century. It is in gritstone with large quoins and a stone slate roof. There are two storeys and a single bay. The building contains mullioned windows with moulded hood moulds, and on the east is an inserted door.	II
Higher Ashen Clough Barn; 53.35774°N 1.93445°W		17th century	The barn is in gritstone, with massive quoins, a stone slate roof, and two storeys. It contains a doorway with a chamfered quoined surround and a massive lintel, an inserted doorway, a loft opening, and slit vents.	II
Barn south of Old Farmhouse; 53.34888°N 1.97410°W		17th century	The barn is in gritstone with large quoins, and a stone slate roof with coped gables, moulded kneelers and a ball finial. The doorways have chamfered quoined surrounds and shouldered lintels, between them is a dormer, and there is a full height arch.	II
Waterside Cottage; 53.34552°N 1.98181°W		17th century	The house, which was extended to the west in the 19th century, is in gritstone with quoins, a stone slate roof, and two storeys. It contains a doorway with a quoined surround, and most of the windows are mullioned, with some mullions missing.	II
Laneside Farmhouse; 53.34532°N 1.96424°W		1654	The farmhouse is in whitewashed gritstone, the gable end rendered, with quoins and a slate roof. There are two storeys and three bays. On the front is a porch, and a doorway with a quoined surround and an initialled and dated lintel. Some of the windows are mullioned, in some windows mullions have been removed, and casement windows inserted, and some windows have hood moulds.	II
Shireoaks Farmhouse; 53.34589°N 1.89477°W		1680	A farmhouse that was refronted in the 20th century, it is in gritstone with quoins, a slate roof, and two storeys. At the rear is a doorway with a chamfered quoined surround, and a massive shouldered lintel inscribed with initials and the date. The windows are mullioned.	II
Chinley Independent Chapel; 53.33494°N 1.91848°W		1711	The chapel is in gritstone, with quoins, a string course, an impost band, and a stone slate roof with coped gables and moulded kneelers. On the west gable is a bellcote, and on the east gable is a weathervane. There are two storeys and six bays. The left bay contains an arched doorway with a chamfered quoined surround, and a keystone. The middle two windows in the upper floor are replacements with segmental heads. The other windows are mullioned with two lights and flat heads, other than the ground floor window in the right bay, which has a semicircular head.	II*
Lower Ashen Clough Barn; 53.35653°N 1.93671°W	—	Early 18th century	The barn is in gritstone with large quoins and a stone slate roof. There are five bays and rear outshuts. On the front are two doorways with chamfered quoined surrounds and a massive shouldered lintel, and slit vents. At the rear is a chamfered archway with a segmental head and quoined sides.	II
Gate piers, gates and walls, Bugsworth Hall; 53.33703°N 1.97018°W		18th century	The gate piers are square, in stone, with moulded cornices and ball finials on pyramidal bases, and the gates are in cast iron. They are flanked by walls with moulded copings, and railings with arrow and urn finials. At the ends of the walls are rectangular piers with ball finials.	II
Deacons Farmhouse; 53.33911°N 1.92503°W		Mid 18th century	The farmhouse is in gritstone with quoins and a stone slate roof. There are two storeys and three bays. The central doorway has a moulded lintel, jambs, and imposts. Over the doorway is a single-light window, the other windows are mullioned with three lights and casements, and at the rear is a staircase window.	II
Brierley Green Farmhouse and barn 53.33829°N 1.96203°W		1760	The farmhouse and barn are under a continuous roof, and the house was extended in the 19th century. They are in gritstone, with a moulded wooden eaves gutter, a stone slate roof, and two storeys. Above the doorway is an initialled datestone, the windows in the original part are mullioned, and in the extension they are sashes. The barn contains three doorways.	II
Slack House Farmhouse and barn 53.34242°N 1.91363°W		1762	The farmhouse and barn are under a continuous roof, and are in gritstone with quoins and two storeys. The house has a tile roof, and the roof of the barn is in stone slate. The house has three bays, and contains a doorway with large jambs and a lintel, over which is a gabled canopy, and an initialled datestone. The windows are mullioned with three lights, and contain small-paned casements. The barn to the east has a doorway with a chamfered quoined surround, mullioned windows, and a circular opening to the loft.	II
High Nightam; 53.36109°N 1.93043°W		Late 18th century	A house in gritstone with a stone slate roof, three storeys and three bays. On the front is a porch, and the windows are mullioned with three lights and casements.	II
Hollins Wood Cottages; 53.33784°N 1.95889°W		Late 18th century	A farmhouse divided into two cottages, it is in gritstone, with stone slate roofs, two storeys and three bays. On the front is a doorway with a quoined surround and a later inserted doorway. The windows in the left two bays are mullioned with three lights, and in the right bay they are sashes.	II
New House Farmhouse and barn 53.34882°N 1.90470°W		Late 18th century	The farmhouse and barn are under a continuous roof, and are in gritstone with quoins and a stone slate roof. The house has two storeys and three bays. In the centre is a doorway with a plain surround, and the windows are mullioned and contain casements. The barn has regularly placed ventilation slits.	II
Barn east of Old Farmhouse; 53.34917°N 1.97376°W		Late 18th century	The barn is in gritstone with large quoins and a stone slate roof. It contains a doorway with a quoined surround and a shouldered lintel, and slit vents.	II
Peathills Farmhouse and barn 53.34645°N 1.98053°W	—	Late 18th century	The farmhouse and barn are under a continuous roof, and are in gritstone with a slate roof. The house has two storeys and two bays. The windows are mullioned with three lights, large flush jambs, imposts and lintels, and contain sashes. The barn to the west has a hayloft opening.	II
Red Mires Farmhouse; 53.35831°N 1.93662°W		Late 18th century	The farmhouse, which was extended in the 19th century, is in gritstone with quoins and a stone slate roof. There are two storeys, two bays, and a later single-bay addition projecting to the east. The two doorways have plain surrounds, in the original part the windows are mullioned with three lights, and contain sashes, and in the later part the windows are plain sashes.	II
Redmires Barn; 53.35815°N 1.93726°W		Late 18th century	The barn is in gritstone, with a stone slate roof, and four bays. It contains a doorway with a chamfered quoined surround, other doorways and windows with massive surrounds, and slit vents.	II
Trout Beck; 53.34416°N 1.91178°W		Late 18th century	A gritstone farmhouse with quoins and a stone slate roof. There are two storeys and three bays. The central doorway has large jambs, imposts, and a lintel. Above the doorway is a sash window, and the other windows are mullioned with three lights containing casements. At the rear is a mullioned and transomed stair window.	II
Wharfinger's House and Office; 53.33592°N 1.97369°W		1796	The buildings are by the entrance to Bugsworth Basin at the end of the Peak Forest Canal. They are in gritstone with a slate roof and two storeys. The doorway has a moulded hood, most of the windows are casements, there are two mullioned windows, and a single-light window.	II
Stables east of Wharfinger's House; 53.33594°N 1.97332°W	—	c. 1800	The stable building is in gritstone with a slate roof. There are two storeys and a rectangular plan. The building contains doorways and a loft opening.	II
White Knowl Methodist Chapel; 53.34249°N 1.92421°W		1809	The chapel is in rendered stone with gritstone dressings and a slate roof. The entrance front has three bays, a central doorway and another doorway to the west, and three semicircular-headed windows with small pane sashes.	II
White Hall; 53.33704°N 1.94504°W		Early 19th century	A gritstone house with a moulded eaves cornice and a hipped 'slate roof. There are two storeys and fronts of three and five bays, and a later service wing. In the centre of the south front is a porch with Ionic columns, and a semicircular doorway with a moulded architrave, above which is a wrought iron balcony. The windows are casements with architraves. On the east front is a two-storey canted bay window. The service wing is embattled and has Gothic detailing.	II
Railway viaducts, Chapel Milton; 53.33291°N 1.91811°W		c. 1867	A pair of converging railway viaducts, the earlier one built by the Midland Railway, and the later one built in about 1894 for the Dore and Chinley line, to carry the lines over the valley of the Black Brook. They are in gritstone, and form two curving arcades, the eastern one with 14 arches, and the western one with 13. They have tapering rectangular piers, with string courses, voussoirs, and parapets with projecting copings.	II
St James' Church, Buxworth; 53.33643°N 1.96908°W		1874	The church is in gritstone, and has a slate roof with a terracotta ridge. It has a single cell, with a west porch, a polygonal apse to the east, and north and south vestries acting as transepts. On the west gable is a coped bellcote, and the windows are lancets.	II
