= Butterley Gangroad =

Early industrial tramway in Derbyshire, England

Coordinates: 53.07315°N 1.46629°W

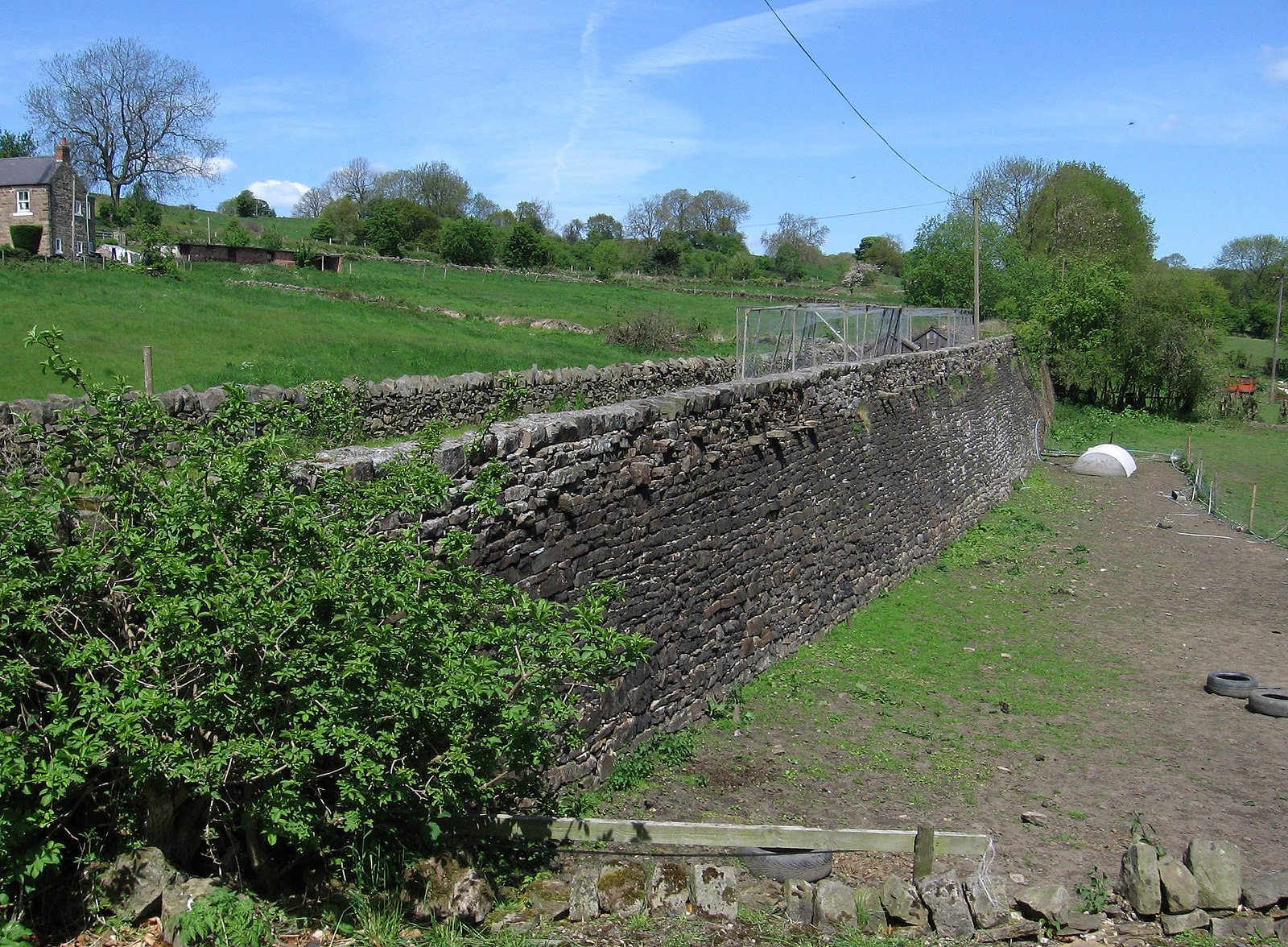
Tramway embankment at Bobbinmill Hill

The Butterley Gangroad was an early tramway in Derbyshire of approximately 3 ft 6 in (1,067 mm) gauge, which linked Hilt's Quarry and other limestone quarries at Crich with the Cromford Canal at Bullbridge. The first railway project of Derbyshire civil engineer Benjamin Outram (1764–1805), the line was originally a horse-drawn and gravity-driven plateway, a form of tramway that Outram popularised. Unlike modern edgeways, where flanges on the wheel guide it along the track, plateways used L-shaped rails where a flange on the rail guided the wheels.

The line was constructed in 1793, with the construction of Fritchley Tunnel, now believed to be the world's oldest railway tunnel, being required to go under a road junction at Fritchley.

A steam locomotive using a walking mechanism, known as the Steam Horse locomotive, was trialled on the line in 1813. In the 1840s, upgrading took place to accommodate steam locomotives, and part of the original line was moved.

The railway remained in use until 1933.

== See also ==
- Butterley Company
- Peak Forest Tramway
- Steam Horse locomotive
