= Wheatcroft, Derbyshire =

Hamlet in Derbyshire, England

Coordinates: 53.110393°N 1.478155°W

Wheatcroft
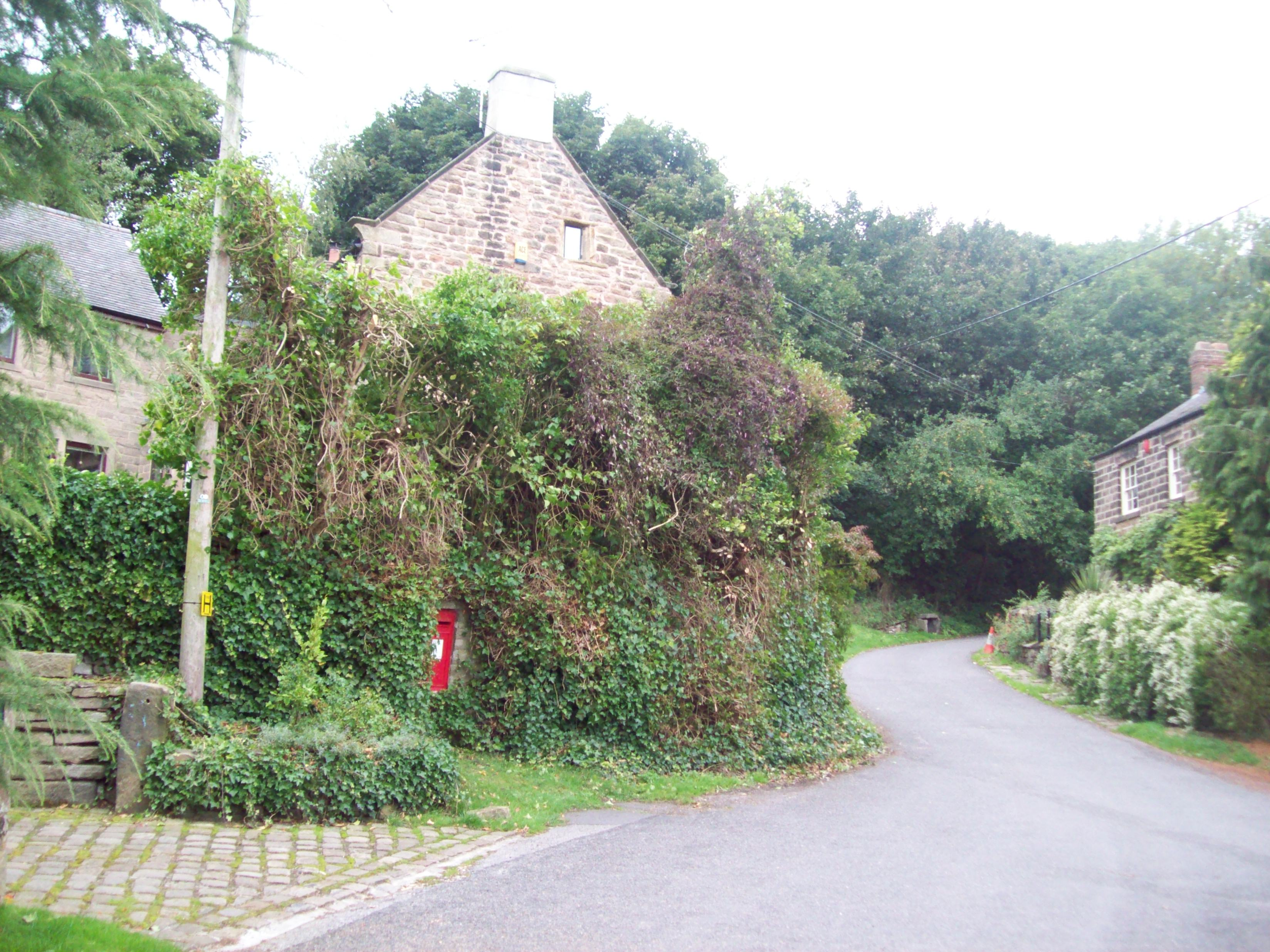

- Location within Derbyshire
- Civil parish: Crich
- District: Amber Valley
- Shire county: Derbyshire
- Region: East Midlands
- Country: England
- Sovereign state: United Kingdom
- Post town: MATLOCK
- Postcode district: DE4
- Dialling code: 01629
- Police: Derbyshire
- Fire: Derbyshire
- Ambulance: East Midlands
- UK Parliament: Amber Valley

Wheatcroft is a hamlet in the civil parish of Crich, in the hills of Amber Valley, Derbyshire, England, near Crich. Wheatcroft has no shop or church and while it once had a chapel it has been renovated into a small dwelling.
