= Bugsworth Basin Heritage Trust =

British canal restoration organisation

- Logo
- Abbreviation: BBHT
- Formation: 1958
- Location: Bugsworth Basin, U.K.
- Coordinates: 53.33490°N 1.96843°W
- Website: bugsworthbasin.org
- Formerly called: Inland Waterways Protection Society

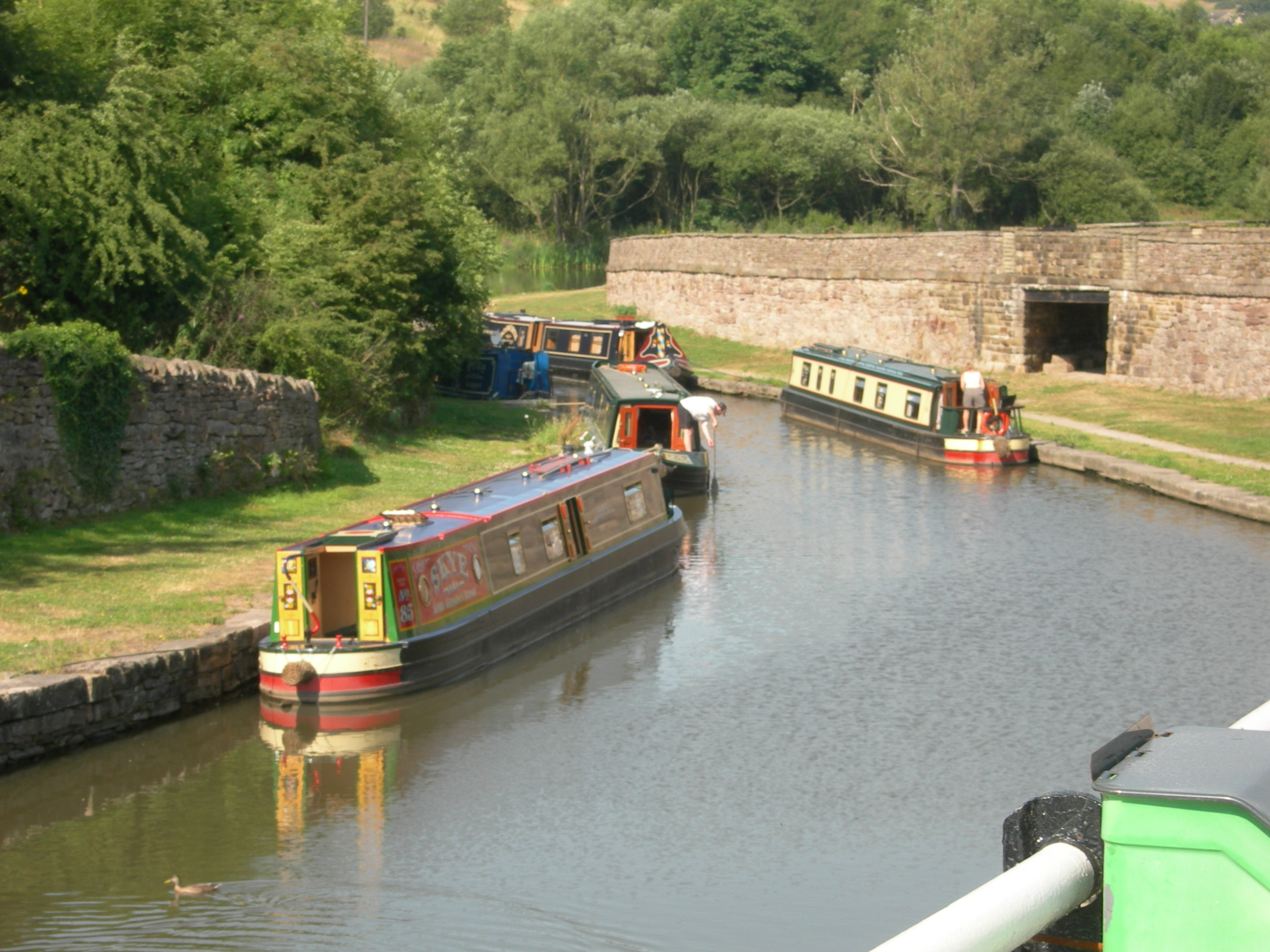
Bugsworth Basin in 2007. The IWPS have been working on its restoration since 1968

The Bugsworth Basin Heritage Trust (BBHT), formerly known as the Inland Waterways Protection Society (IWPS), was a British organisation founded in 1958 to work for the restoration of the canal system. Its members carried out surveys of canals and produced reports in support of their retention when much of the canal network was under threat. Following official support for use of the canals for leisure activities in 1967, the Society concentrated their efforts on the restoration and operation of Bugsworth Basin, located at the southern end of the Peak Forest Canal, which was one of the first canals that they surveyed in 1958.

After its official reopening in 2005 the basin was managed by the Bugsworth Basin Heritage Trust (BBHT) until the final piece of restoration was completed and subsequently the management was handed back to the Canal and River Trust. The BBHT was finally wound up in 2025.

== Background ==
Following the nationalisation of much of the canal network in 1948, and despite official attitudes which often saw the canals only as commercial highways, there had been some progress towards using them for pleasure cruising. On 17 March 1954, the Minister of Transport announced in Parliament that the British Transport Commission would be considering the plight of the network. A Board of Survey, under the chairmanship of Lord Rusholme, prepared the report, which was published in April 1955. This divided the existing canals into three groups. Group 1, consisting of the River Trent, the River Severn, the River Lee Navigation, the River Weaver, the Aire and Calder Navigation and the southern part of the Grand Union Canal, should be retained and improved. This group included just 336 miles (541 km) of waterway. A further 994 miles (1,600 km) were included in group 2. This group included most of the narrow canals that still had significant commercial traffic and some wide canals such as the Leeds and Liverpool Canal. The report suggested that attempts to increase the commercial traffic on these canals should be made, but that they should be relegated to group 3 if the traffic did not appear. Group 3 canals, which covered all the rest, should be considered for disposal to organisations other than the British Transport Commission or closed. The group included 771 miles (1,241 km) of canal, but about one third of them were already closed, having been abandoned as a result of the LMS General Powers Act of 1945.

This approach was considered by the Bowes Committee, which published their report, entitled The Report of the Committee of Inquiry into Inland Waterways (Cmnd 486) in July 1958. This proposed two groups of waterways, Class A and Class B, that were similar to the groups 1 and 2 of the 1954 report, and that all other canals should be developed for purposes that did not include navigation, or should be eliminated.

== Organisation ==
Amidst fears that there might be little of the canal network left unless urgent action was taken, a number of canal enthusiasts in the East Midlands formed the Inland Waterways Protection Society on 21 April 1958. It was initially a breakaway movement from the Inland Waterways Association (IWA), which at the time was undergoing radical reorganisation to become a non-profit distributing company limited by guarantee. The president was Sir Geoffrey Lowles, who was still a member of the IWA council at the time, and had opposed the reorganisation. Teddy Edwards was its waterways consultant, and Mrs Bessie Bunker of Sheffield became its secretary. She was accused by Robert Aickman, the chairman of the IWA, of being the founder of the new society, and although she rejected the idea, she did admit that it would probably not have been formed without her.

By the time the Bowes Report was published in July, the IWPS was ready to Act, and immediately started to visit and review the Class C waterways, so that they would have facts to argue the case for retention, and could produce informed reports on their condition. During 1958, they succeeding in covering the Stratford-upon-Avon Canal, the Dearne and Dove Canal and the Chesterfield Canal. Reports on the Pocklington Canal, the Macclesfield Canal and the Peak Forest Canal followed in early 1959, and other canals were surveyed subsequently.

In February 1959, the government admitted that the implementation of the Bowes Report would require extensive legislation, and set up the Inland Waterways Redevelopment Advisory Committee (IWRAC) to assist in the redevelopment of Class C waterways. Its members included several who were sympathetic to the restoration movement, including the author Tom Rolt. In May 1959 the IWPS organised a protest cruise on the Chesterfield Canal, to try to convince the authorities that it should be retained, and in the following month presented their first report to the IWRAC. It gave detailed arguments for the restoration of the Pocklington Canal, when the Advisory Committee were considering whether it should be filled in and abandoned. Similar reports concerning the future of the Dudley Canal, the Stourbridge Canal and the Titford Branch Canal were presented to the IWRAC in August. Members also began to campaign for the Cromford Canal, with the Leawood Pump House, to be retained.

Members made a survey of the Ashton Canal during the winter of 1959/60, and began inspecting the Peak Forest Canal in February 1960. This included an assessment of Bugsworth Basin, at the terminus of the canal. Together with an inspection of the Caldon Canal, this work enabled them to present reports on all three canals to IWRAC, which included detailed assessments of ways in which they might be restored both economically and successfully. A forward-looking report for a new canal route between Leeds and London, which would include parts of the Dearne and Dove Canal and the Chesterfield Canal, was presented to the IWRAC on 7 April 1960, and another protest cruise was held on the Chesterfield Canal on 30 April 1960. Despite the work of the society, and recommendations by the IWRAC that they should be retained, the British Transport Commission announced to Parliament in November 1961 that the Chesterfield Canal, the upper Erewash Canal, the Buckingham Branch and the Dudley Canal and Dudley Tunnel would be closed. Both the IWPS and the Inland Waterways Association protested. Ernest Marples, the minister of transport, stated that "the canals are not viable in their present form," and that a proposed authority to oversee them "may well involve the closure of canals and their conversion or disposal if, thereby, the burden on the tax payer can be relieved." As the threats to the network persisted, the initial campaigning by the IWPS was in many cases assisted by local societies representing individual waterways. Thus the Retford and Worksop Boat Club was formed in February 1962 to campaign for the Chesterfield Canal, and the Marple Residents Association worked to get Marple aqueduct repaired and the Peak Forest Canal reopened,

In 1962, responsibility for the canals passed to a new body, the British Waterways Board, and the IWRAC was abolished. There was considerable debate in the House of Lords as to whether they canals were public or private rights-of-way. If they were private, like the railways, then there was only a responsibility to maintain them for the safety of the public, but if they were public, then there was a responsibility to maintain them for navigation. Ultimately, it was decided that they were public rights-of-way, and this fact was enshrined in the Transport Act 1962. Meanwhile, the IWPS continued to make tours and inspections of canals under threat. Their survey of the Chesterfield Canal in 1964 revealed significant problems at the Chesterfield end. A confectionery factory had been built over the terminal basin, the section from Killamarsh to Spinkhill bridge was dry, and High Moor lock house had been demolished and the rubble pushed into the lock chamber. It would be another three years before officials finally recognised that the canal network had a future besides use for commercial carrying. A White Paper called British Waterways: Recreation and Amenity was presented to Parliament in September 1967. The Minister for Transport, Barbara Castle, announced that the Government now realised that pleasure cruising was not a pastime confined to the rich, that the British Waterways Board would have a duty to ensure that the canals were suitable for powered pleasure boats, and that 1,400 miles (2,300 km) of the network would be retained.

== Restoration ==
The Peak Forest Canal was one of the first canals surveyed by the newly formed IWPS. At its southern end, the canal splits into two. The line to Whaley Bridge was originally a branch, and the line to Bugsworth Basin was the main line, although this designation has now been reversed. The name of the village has been changed to Buxworth, which is supposedly more desirable, although the basin retains the original spelling. The Bugsworth line was last used for commercial traffic in 1922, and was abandoned in 1925. Since 1968, the main aims of the IWPS have been the restoration and operation of Bugsworth Basin. The society became a non-profit limited company in 1982, and the rift with the Inland Waterways Association, which resulted in the formation of the society in 1958, was resolved in 1995, when the society re-affiliated to the IWA.

On 14 September 1968, the IWPS received permission from British Waterways to commence restoration of Bugsworth Basin. In 1970, the IWPS was awarded a Bronze Plaque under the Countryside Awards Scheme of the European Conservation Year. On 6 September 1975, the Entrance Basin was re-watered and boats passed into it for the first time in more than 30 years. However, the canal was found to be leaking and it had to be drained shortly afterwards.

On 18 April 1982, the Entrance Basin was re-watered again to admit boats but the canal was found to be still leaking and it had to be drained once more. In November 1998, a greater area of Bugsworth Basin was re-watered and boats entered again. In April 1999 there was a celebration of the return of boats but once again the canal was found to be leaking and it had to be drained.

Following an extensive geological survey of the ground, which included the drilling of core sample for analysis, DewPitchmastic commenced work on sealing the canal in December 2003. In addition to this work, GallifordTry, the omnibus contractor for British Waterways, cleared and then sealed part of the Entrance Canal, to make it watertight, as it was also leaking. The latter work was completed just in time for the Official Opening of Bugsworth Basin on Easter Saturday 2005.

After its reopening the basin was managed by the Bugsworth Basin Heritage Trust until the final piece of restoration was completed and subsequently the management was handed back to the Canal and River Trust. The BBHT was finally wound up in 2025.

== See also ==
- Inland Waterways Association (IWA) (in the UK)

== Bibliography ==
- Bolton, David (1990). Race Against Time. Methuen. ISBN 0-413-63470-1.
- Hadfield, Charles; Biddle, Gordon (1970). The Canals of North West England, Vol 2 (pp.241-496). David and Charles. ISBN 0-7153-4992-9.
- Nicholson (2006). Nicholson Guides Vol 5: North West and the Pennines. Harper Collins. ISBN 978-0-00-721113-5.
- Roffey, James (1989). The Chesterfield Canal. Barracuda Books. ISBN 978-0-86023-461-6.
- Squires, Roger (2008). Britain's restored canals. Landmark Publishing. ISBN 978-1-84306-331-5.
- Whalley, Martin (2007). "A brief history of the IWPS". Inland Waterways Protection Society. Archived from the original on 14 April 2012.
