= Crich =

Village and civil parish in the English county of Derbyshire

Coordinates: 53.084°N 1.479°W

- Village
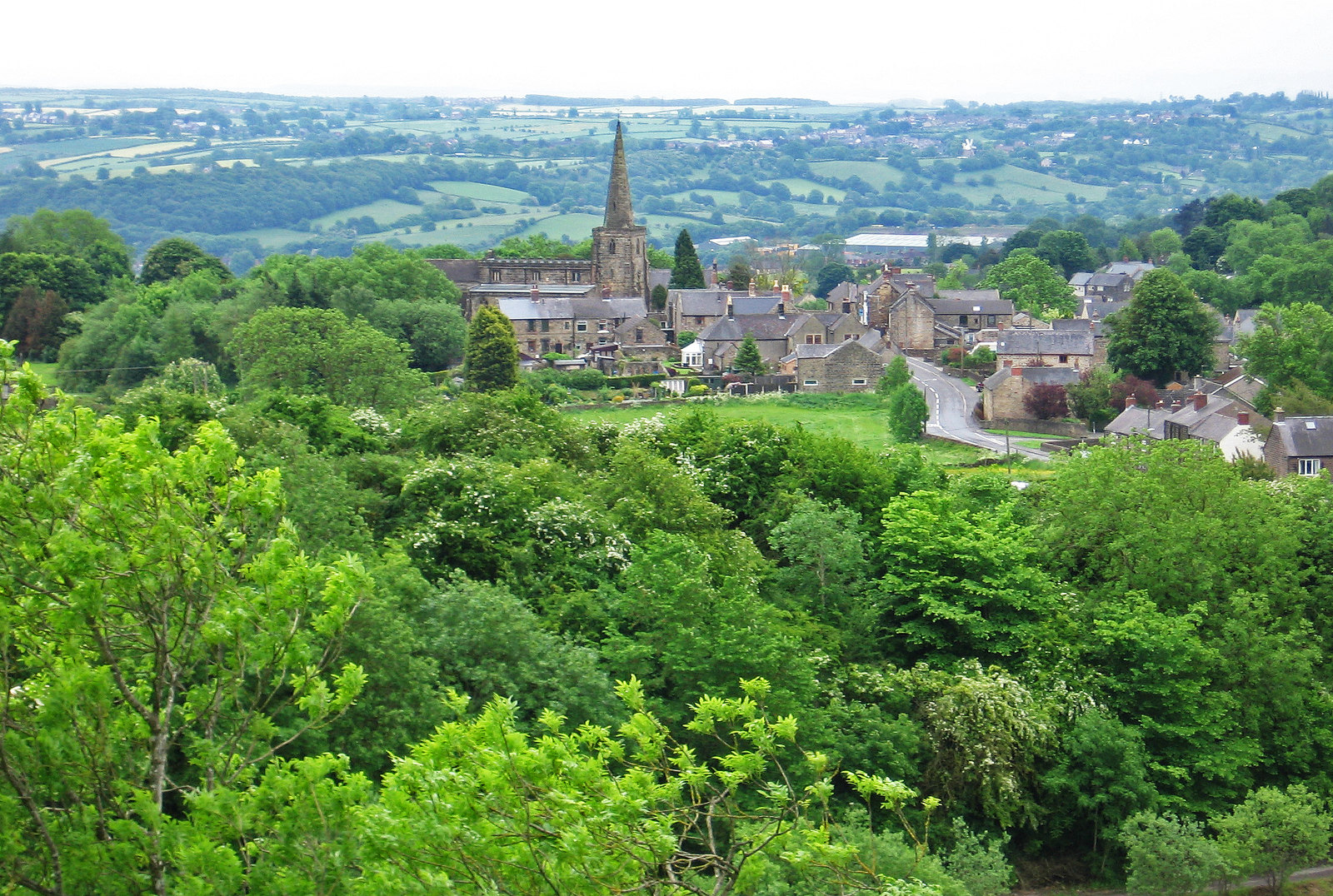
- A view of the village in 2013

- Location within Derbyshire
- Population: 2,821 (2001 census)
- OS grid reference: SK3454
- Civil parish: Crich
- District: Amber Valley
- Shire county: Derbyshire
- Region: East Midlands
- Country: England
- Sovereign state: United Kingdom
- Post town: Matlock
- Postcode district: DE4
- Dialling code: 01773
- Police: Derbyshire
- Fire: Derbyshire
- Ambulance: East Midlands
- UK Parliament: Derbyshire Dales
- Website: Crichweb

Crich /ˈkraɪtʃ/ is a village and civil parish in the Amber Valley district of Derbyshire, England. Besides the village of Crich itself, the civil parish includes the nearby villages of Fritchley and Whatstandwell, and the hamlets of Coddington, Wakebridge, and Wheatcroft. The population of the civil parish at the 2001 census was 2,821, increasing to 2,898 at the 2011 census.

The village is home to the National Tramway Museum and, at the summit of Crich Hill above, a memorial tower known as Crich Stand to those of the Sherwood Foresters regiment who died in battle, particularly during the First World War.

== History ==
In 1009 King Æthelred the Unready signed a charter at the Great Council which recognised the position and boundaries of Weston-on-Trent and several other manors including Crich. The charter shows that Weston controlled the nearby crossings of the Trent. The land was listed as eight hides at Weston upon Trent, and a hide at Crich, Morley, Smalley, Ingleby and Kidsley. This land was then given to Morcar, the King's chief minister, and he was unusually given rights that were normally reserved for the King alone. He was given the responsibility for justice and exemption from the Trinoda necessitas, he alone could decide a fate of life or death without the need of the authority of the King or his sheriff. Morcar was given further lands in Derbyshire. Weston-on-Trent (and Crich?) again come under the control of Æþelræd Unræd, when Morcar and his brother were murdered by Eadric in 1015.

Parts of the Church of England parish church of Saint Mary are Norman, with later Decorated Gothic and Perpendicular Gothic alterations from the 14th century. Crich has also a Wesleyan chapel that was built in 1770.

A workhouse was opened in 1734 on the edge of Nether Common. It could accommodate 40 inmates, and accepted paupers from other parishes, including Melbourne, Pentrich, Willington, Mercaston and Denby.

The population in the 1841 census was 2,619 inhabitants.

Chase Cliffe is a Tudor Revival house on the road from Crich to Whatstandwell. It was designed by Benjamin Ferrey and built in 1859–1861.

== Quarrying ==
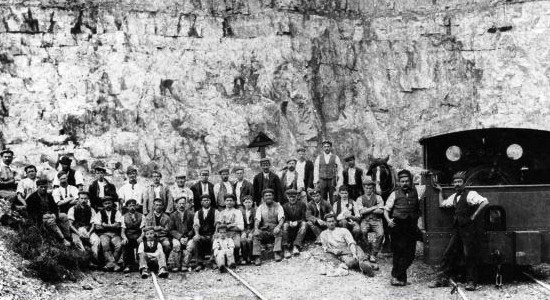
Workers at Crich Quarry, c. 1900

Geologically, Crich lies on a small inlier of Carboniferous Limestone (an outcrop on the edge of the Peak District surrounded by younger Upper Carboniferous rocks).

Quarrying for limestone probably began in Roman times. In 1791 Benjamin Outram and Samuel Beresford bought land for a quarry to supply limestone to their new ironworks at Butterley. This became known as Hilt's Quarry, and the stone was transported down a steep wagonway, the Butterley Company Gangroad, to the Cromford Canal at Bullbridge. Near there they also built lime kilns for supplying farmers and for the increasing amount of building work. Apart from a period when it was leased to Albert Banks, the quarry and kilns were operated by the Butterley Company until 1933. The gangroad, descending some 300 feet in about a mile, was at first worked by gravity, a brakeman "spragging" the wheels of the wagons, which were returned to the summit by horses. However, in 1812 the incline was the scene of a remarkable experiment, when William Brunton, an engineer for the company, produced his Steam Horse locomotive.

=== Crich Mineral Railway ===
In 1840 George Stephenson, in building the North Midland Railway, discovered deposits of coal at Clay Cross and formed what later became the Clay Cross Company. He realised that burning lime would provide a use for the coal slack that would otherwise go to waste. He leased Cliff Quarry and built lime kilns at Bullbridge. In 1841, he built the Crich Mineral Railway to connect the quarry to the lime kilns at Ambergate station. This included a 550 yards (500 m) long, self-acting incline known as "The Steep", with a maximum gradient of 1 in 5.

The railway was probably the first metre-gauge railway in the world.

=== End of quarrying ===
Cliff Quarry closed in 1957, though it restarted at the western end until 2010 when it was mothballed. The eastern end was bought by the National Tramway Museum in 1959.

Hilt's Quarry closed in 1933 and is derelict. For 38 years, the multinational aerospace and defence company Rolls-Royce Holdings used it for dumping low-level radioactive waste such as enriched uranium, cobalt-60 (^{60}Co) and carbon-14 (^{14}C). Following a campaign and blockades by villagers in the Crich and District Environment Action Group, dumping ceased in 2002. In 2004 the Government backed an Environment Agency (EA) document banning further dumping, and Rolls-Royce will be required to restore and landscape the site.

== Memorial tower ==
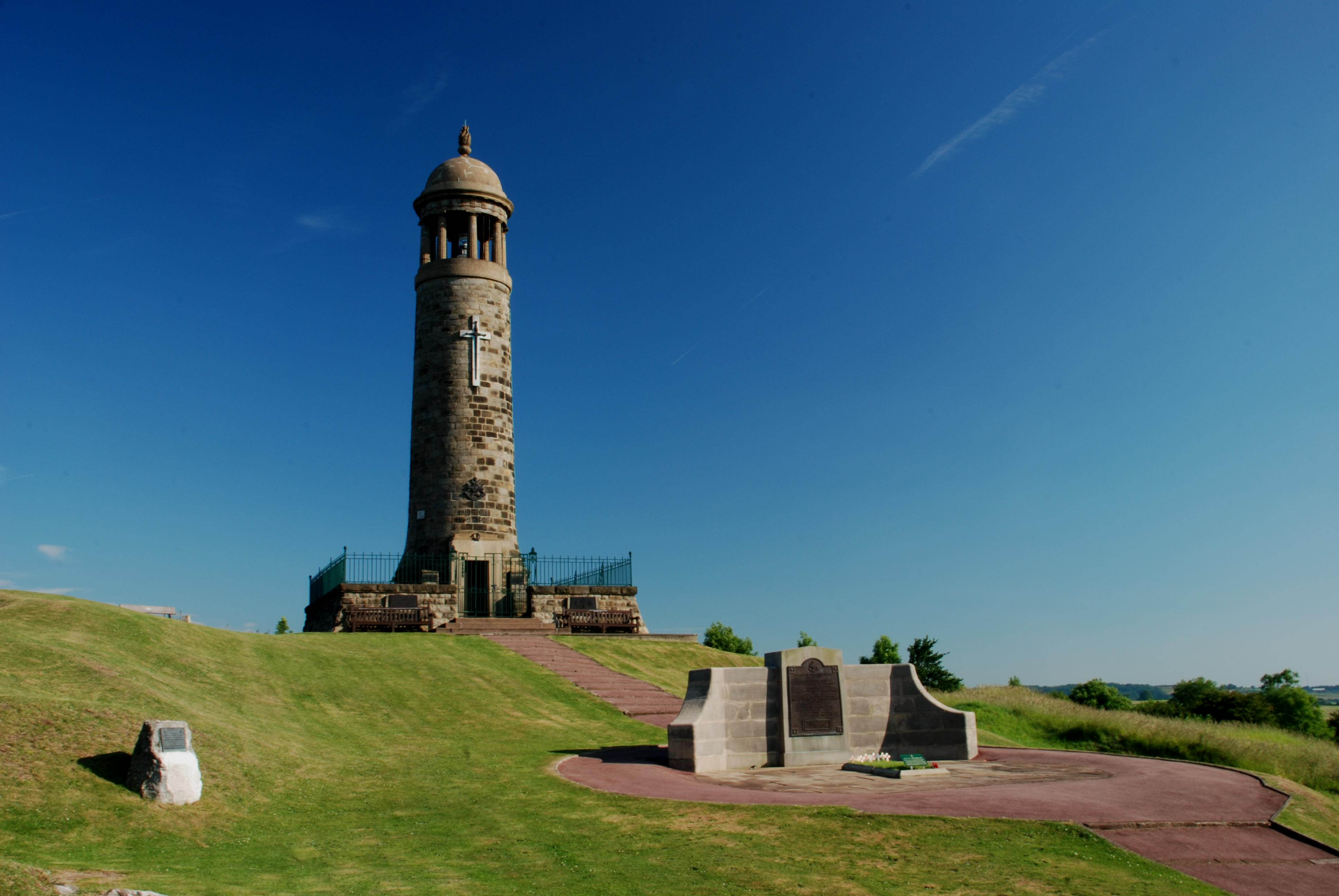
Crich Stand memorial tower in 2009

The memorial tower (Crich Stand) was originally erected in 1923 as a memorial to the 11,409 soldiers from the Sherwood Foresters regiment who died during the First World War, a dedication that was later extended to include the Second World War. It was built on an limestone outcrop above the village, at an altitude of 1,000 feet (300 m) above sea level. The location is symbolic because it is widely visible across, and gives views of, both of the two counties from which the regiment was raised (Nottinghamshire and Derbyshire). It is the destination of an annual pilgrimage on the first Sunday in July.

Besides the main dedication, two further commemorative plaques dedicate the memorial to those who died serving in the Sherwood Foresters regiment from 1945 to 1970, and to those who died serving the Worcestershire and Sherwood Foresters Regiment from 1970 to 2007 and the Mercian Regiment since 2007. A nearby small plaque is dedicated to Brigadier J.H.M. Hackett, 'Last Colonel The Sherwood Foresters 1965 – 1970 and First Colonel The Worcestershire and Sherwood Foresters Regiment'.

== National Tramway Museum ==
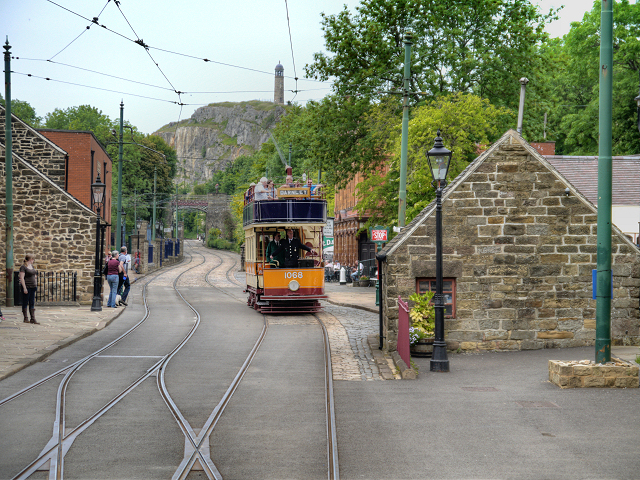
The National Tramway Museum, with Crich Stand in the background in 2013

Beneath Crich Stand, at the northern end of Crich village, is the National Tramway Museum (also known as Crich Tramway Village) which is the UK's largest and most comprehensive museum of trams and tramways. The museum contains over 80 trams built between 1873 and 1982 and includes several exhibitions and a recreated period street containing a working pub, cafe, souvenir shop, sweet shop and various pieces of period street furniture.

Many of the museum's collection of trams are operational, and carry passengers on journeys through the period street and out into the local countryside on a 1.6 kilometres (0.99 mi) long running track. Along the way are the preserved 1763 facade of the Derby Assembly Rooms, a recreated Victorian public park, a woodland sculpture trail and a display on the local lead mining industry.

== Transport ==
The nearest railway station to Crich is Whatstandwell, which serves the villages of Whatstandwell and Crich Carr. Other nearby railway stations are Belper, Matlock and Alfreton through which East Midlands Railway operate regular trains to, and from Derby, with Alfreton offering services to, and from Manchester Piccadilly, and Liverpool Lime Street for northern travellers.

There are also infrequent buses that stop in Crich that alternately terminate at Alfreton, Ripley, Nether Heage, Belper, Matlock, and Oakerthorpe. All bus services stop around 7–8pm.

Leashaw Road closed in November 2022 because of a major landslip which damaged both the road and the adjoining pavement. This had previously connected services between Crich and Matlock, but is not expected to reopen until December 2026. As a consequence, buses have been redirected up Plaistow Green Road instead. Derbyshire in general is prone to landslips in wet weather conditions, because of the underlying geology of clay and shale which, once saturated, can cause ground to move downhill under the influence of gravity. The repairs required at Leashaw have been complicated by the proximity of residential housing, and the many utility services contained within the road, some of which were affected by the landslip or had the potential to be damaged by any further movement.

== Archives ==
A collection of title deeds relating to land and property in Crich is held at the Cadbury Research Library of the University of Birmingham.

== In popular culture ==
The village was a location for the setting of the ITV drama series Peak Practice (1993–2002), along with the nearby Ashover for a time. Images of the village also appear in the drama film And When Did You Last See Your Father? (2007), starring Colin Firth. In the film Firth can be seen riding a motorcycle up Chapel Lane.

== Gallery ==
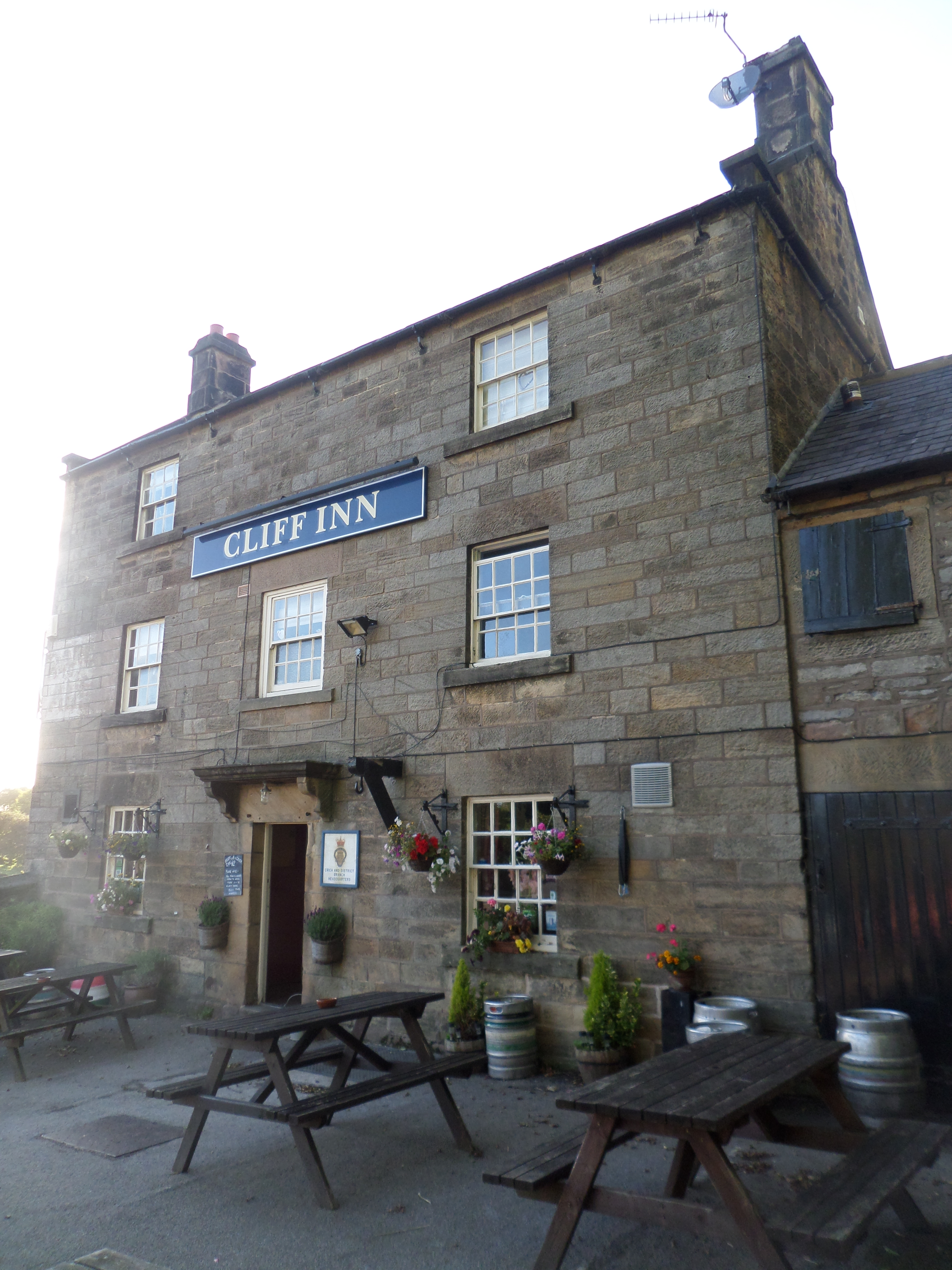
The Cliff Inn in 2014

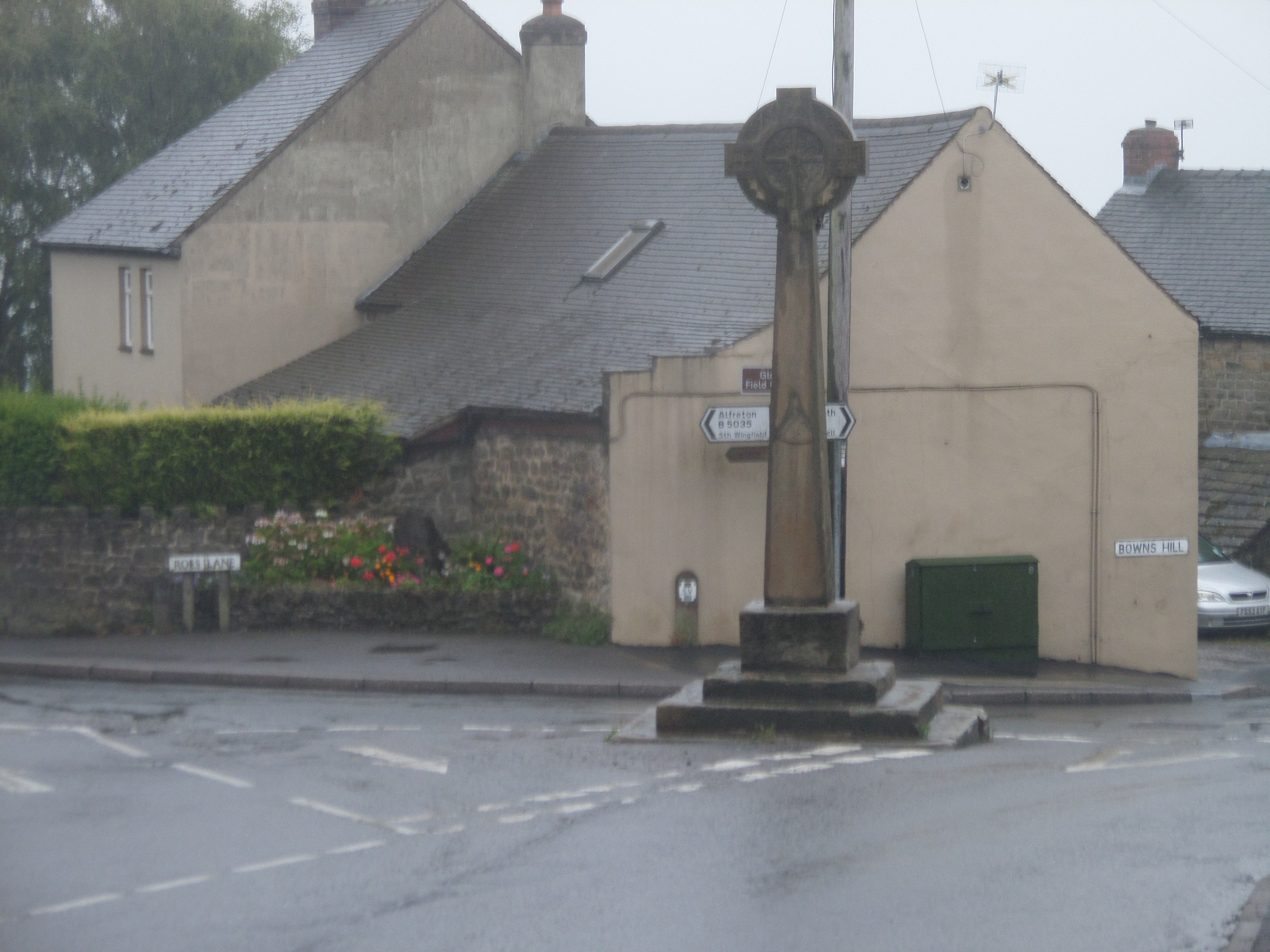
Crich Cross, 2014

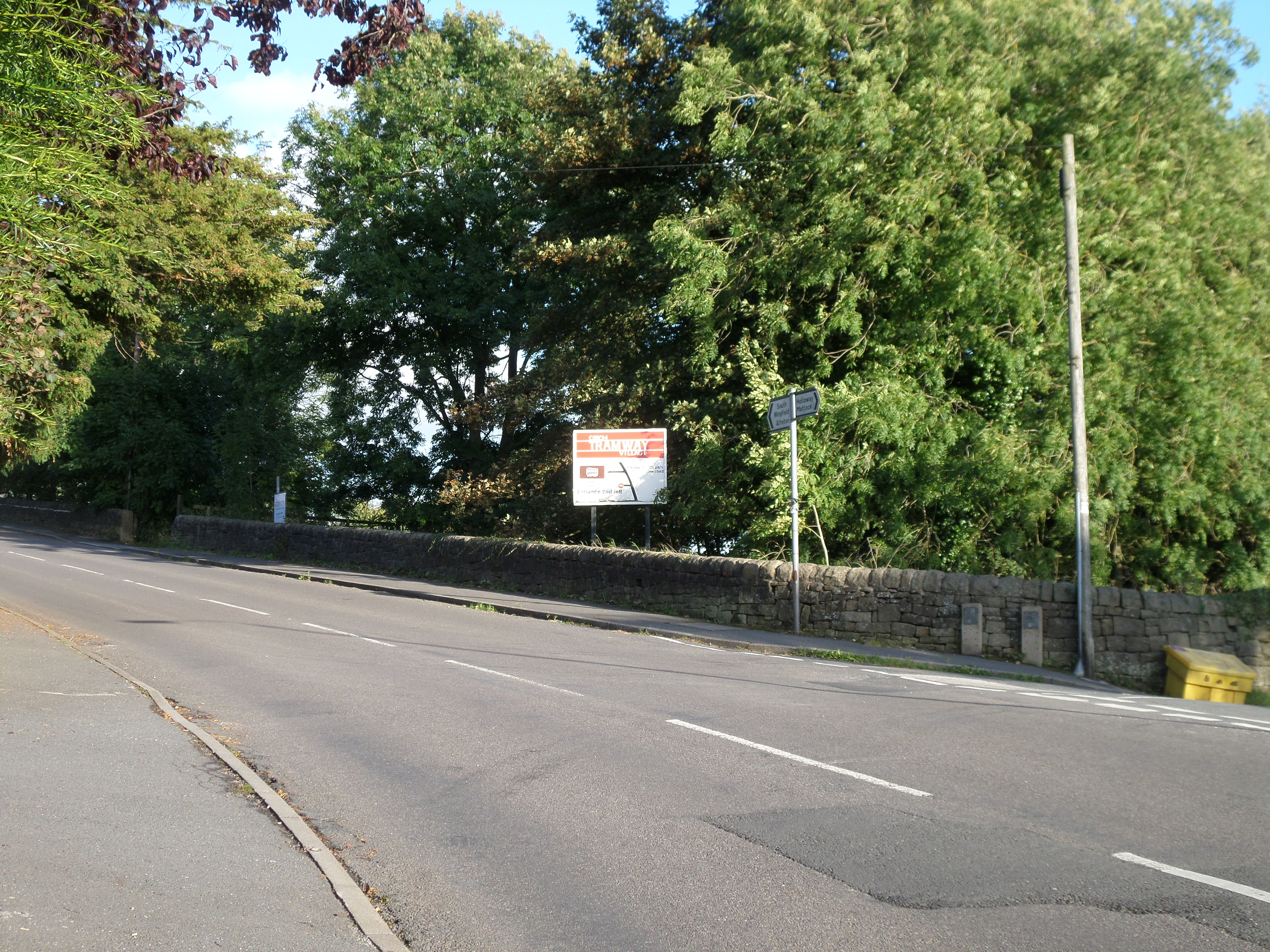
A sign for the National Tramway Museum (when it was known as the Crich Tramway Village), 2014

== See also ==
- Listed buildings in Crich
