= Fritchley =

Village in Derbyshire, England

Coordinates: 53.072°N 1.468°W

- Village
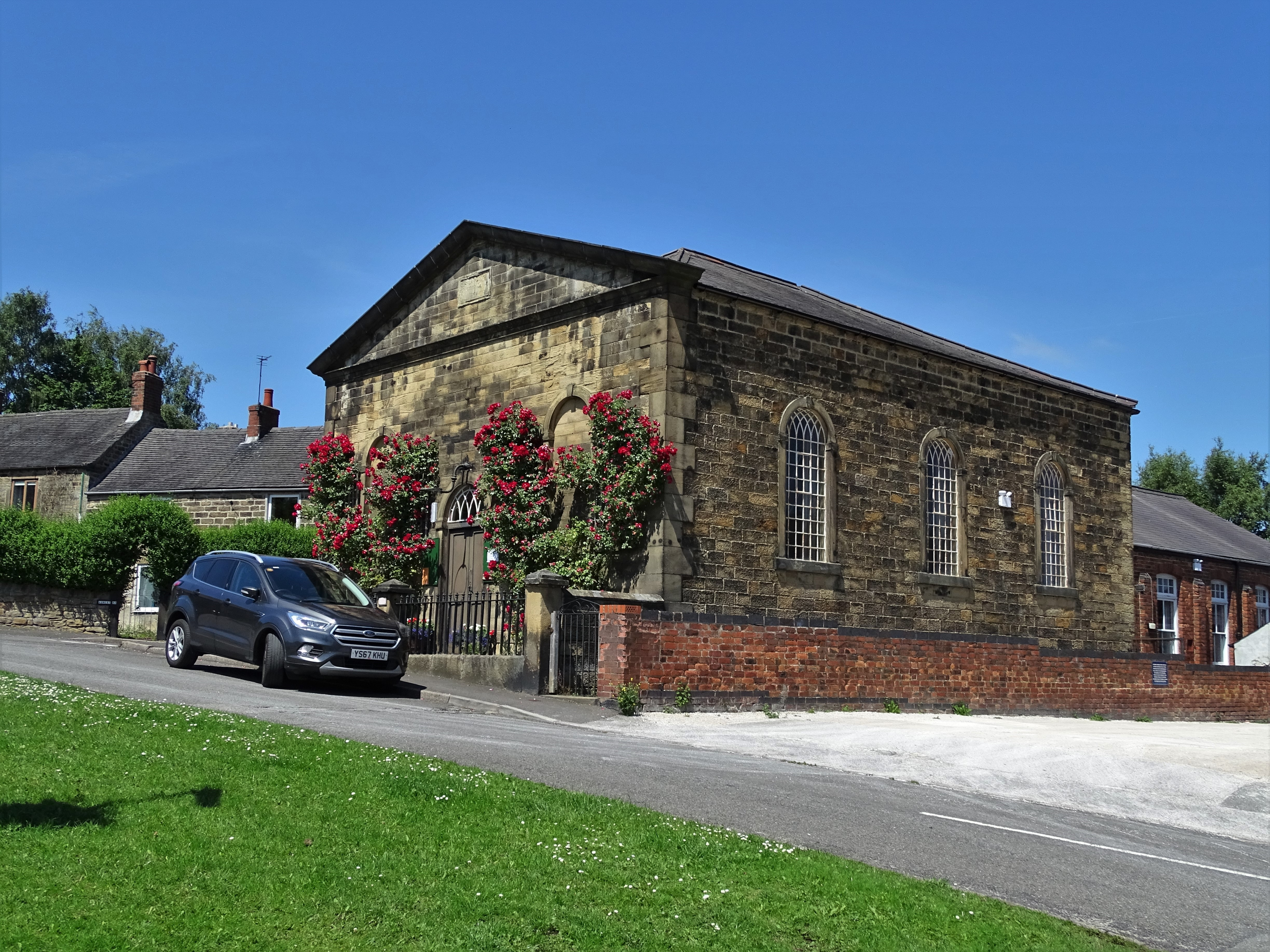

- Location within Derbyshire
- OS grid reference: SK357528
- District: Amber Valley
- Shire county: Derbyshire
- Region: East Midlands
- Country: England
- Sovereign state: United Kingdom
- Post town: BELPER
- Postcode district: DE56
- Dialling code: 01773
- Police: Derbyshire
- Fire: Derbyshire
- Ambulance: East Midlands
- UK Parliament: Amber Valley

Fritchley is a small village in Derbyshire, England, situated to the south of Crich and north of Ambergate. It falls under the civil parish of Crich. To the east of the village is the ruin of a windmill. Fritchley has an active Congregational Church, and there is a Quaker meeting house with an active Quaker Meeting. There is a pub, the Red Lion, but the post office closed in 2009. The village hosts a steam rally each August.

In 1793, Fritchley Tunnel was constructed under a public road on the Butterley Gangroad, the Butterley Company's plateway to carry limestone from Hilt's Quarry at Crich to kilns on the Cromford Canal at Bullbridge, by Benjamin Outram. It is considered the world's oldest surviving railway tunnel. It The tunnel was scheduled under the Ancient Monuments and Archaeological Areas Act in February 2015.

Fritchley was used as one of the filming locations for the hit UK TV series, Peak Practice, which ran from 1993 to 2002.

== See also ==
- Listed buildings in Ripley, Derbyshire
