= Butterley (disambiguation) =

Butterley is a village in Derbyshire, England.

Butterley may also refer to:

- Butterley railway station, in the Derbyshire village
- Butterley Company, a defunct engineering company in Derbyshire, England
- Nigel Butterley (1935–2022), Australian composer

== See also ==
- Butterleigh, Devon, England, a village
- Butterly (disambiguation)
