= Ambergate–Pye Bridge line =

Railway line in Derbyshire, England

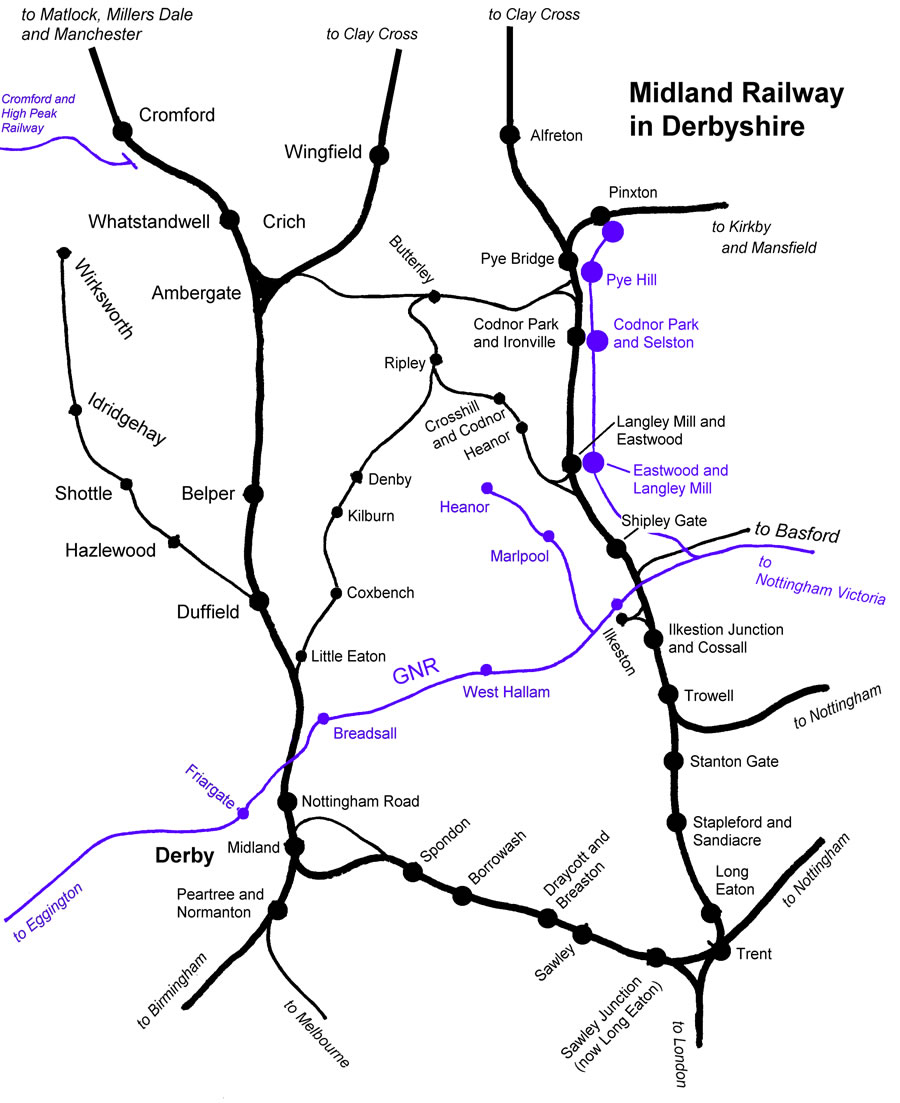

The Ambergate–Pye Bridge line is a partially opened and closed railway line in Derbyshire, England. It was a short east–west line linking the Midland Main Line with the Erewash Valley line. The line was opened by the Midland Railway to freight on 1 February 1875, and to passenger trains on 1 May 1875. The Midland was grouped into the London, Midland and Scottish Railway (LMS) in 1923.

== Route ==
The line, which was double track, started from the Midland Main Line north of Ambergate railway station at Crich Junction (53°3′50.00″N 1°23′2.00″W) and proceeded through Sawmills, Butterley (where there was a station), Swanwick (where the Swanwick Colliery branch diverged). At its eastern end, it connected to the Erewash Valley line via a triangular junction known as Riddings Junction (with the three points being Riddings Junction, Ironville Junction and Codnor Park Junction). Pye Bridge railway station on the Erewash Valley line was just to the north of this triangle. At this point, the two sides of the triangle cross the River Erewash, meaning that a very small section of the line is actually in Nottinghamshire.

== List of stations and junctions along the line ==
- Ambergate
- Hammersmith Latter addition by Midland Railway – Butterley
- Butterley
- Swanwick Junction Latter addition by Midland Railway – Butterley
- Pye Bridge

== Closure ==
Passenger services were withdrawn on 16 June 1947, just prior to the line passing into British Railways ownership. BR withdrew freight from the line on 23 December 1968, as a result of the Beeching Axe.

== Preservation ==
Today, the line is preserved and used partially by the Midland Railway – Butterley between Hammersmith and Ironville Junction, while on the western section a road has been built on the same alignment.

The MR-B aims to extend the route of the preserved railway into Pye Bridge within the foreseeable future.
