= British Rail Class 100 =

Diesel multiple train units, 1956–1958

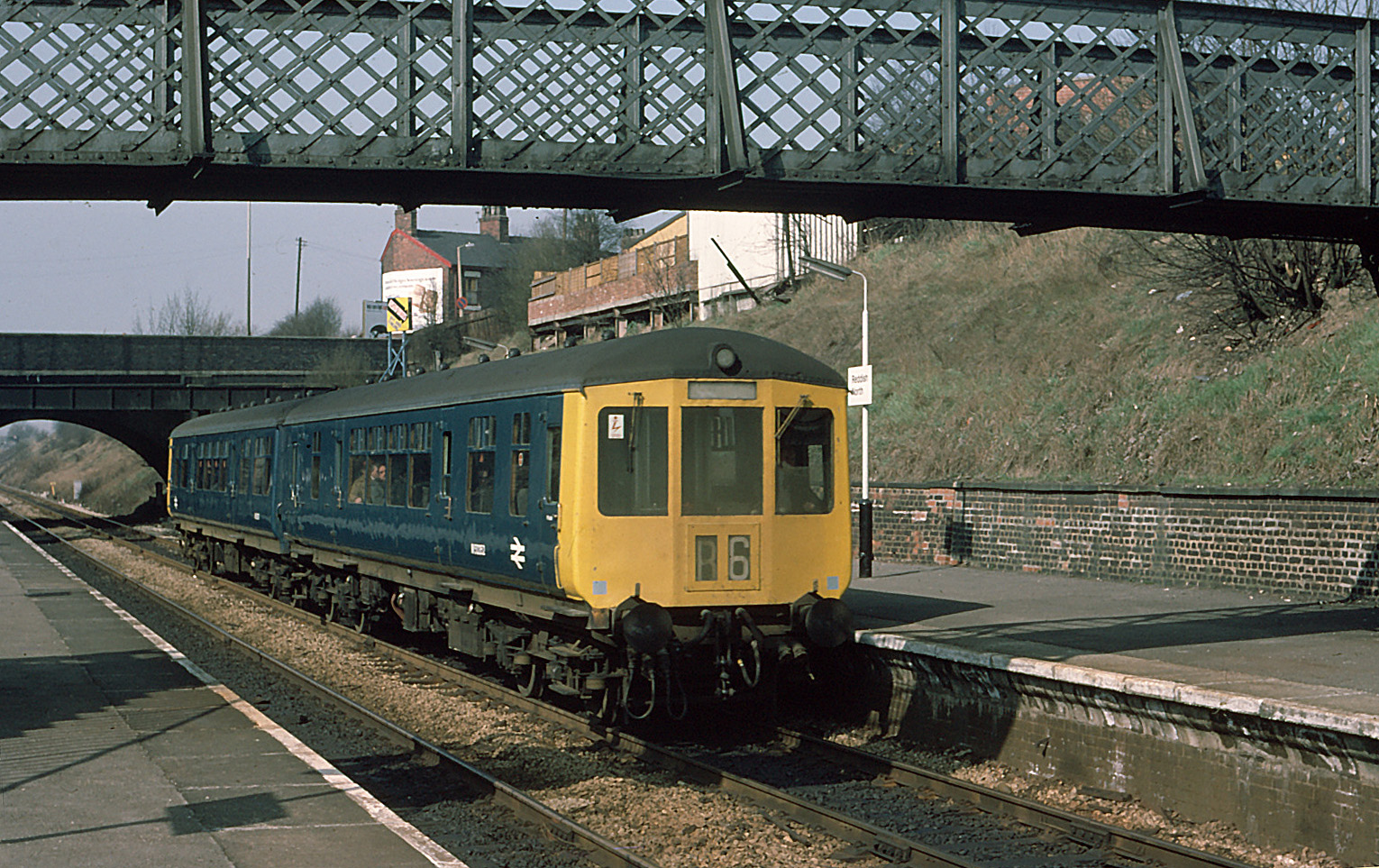
- A Class 100 at Reddish North in 1976
- In service: 1957–1988
- Manufacturer: Gloucester Railway Carriage and Wagon Company
- Family name: First generation
- Replaced: Steam locomotives and carriages
- Constructed: 1957–1958
- Number built: 40 sets (80 cars)
- Number preserved: 3 cars
- Formation: 2 cars sets: DMBS-DTCL
- Capacity: DMBS: 52 second class seats, DMCL: 12 first and 54 second class seats
- Operator: British Rail

Specifications
- Car length: 57 ft 6 in (17.53 m)
- Width: 9 ft 3 in (2.82 m)
- Height: 12 ft 8 1/2 in (3.87 m)
- Maximum speed: 70 mph (113 km/h)
- Weight: DMBS: 30 long tons 5 cwt (67,700 lb or 30,700 kg), DMCL: 24 tons 15 cwt (55,400 lb or 25,100 kg)
- Prime mover: Two BUT (AEC) 6-cylinder diesel engines
- Power output: 150 bhp (112 kW) per engine
- Transmission: Mechanical: 4-speed epicyclic gearbox
- Braking system: Vacuum
- Coupling system: Screw-link couplings, British Standard gangways
- Multiple working: ■ Blue Square
- Track gauge: 4 ft 8 1/2 in (1,435 mm)

The British Rail Class 100 diesel multiple units were built by Gloucester Railway Carriage and Wagon Company Limited from 1956 to 1958, designed and built in collaboration with the Transport Sales Dept. of T.I. (Group Services) Ltd.

== Introduction ==
The class were designed to be lightweight to allow for good acceleration. None were selected for refurbishment and withdrawals started in 1969. The last passenger car was withdrawn from service in 1988.

Table of orders
Lot No.	Car type	Quantity	Fleet numbers	Notes
30278	Driving Motor Brake Second (DMBS)	20	50339–50358	
30279	Driving Trailer Composite with Lavatory (DTCL)	20	56094–56113	originally Class 143.
30444	Driving Motor Brake Second (DMBS)	20	51108–51127	
30445	Driving Trailer Composite with Lavatory (DTCL)	20	56300–56319	originally Class 143.

Under initial classification 1973, the DTCLs became class 143 but were later reclassified as class 100.

DTCL 56111 was used as a training aid by the Ministry of Defence until 1985.

Two sets entered Departmental service: DMBS 51122 and DTCL 56300 became ADB975664 and ADB975637 for use as the "Stourton Saloon" – the Eastern Region General Manager's saloon – for which the class gained a small amount of "fame"; this pair were scrapped, in 1990, at Mayer-Newman's yard at Snailwell, in Cambridgeshire. The other pair were ADB975349 and ADB975539 (formerly DMBS 51116 and DTCL 56101) and were used as the Eastern Region inspection saloon, until being scrapped in 1993.

DTCL 56106 was also taken into Departmental service, becoming ADB977191, part of the Crewe Works test train. This vehicle survived the longest time on the national network, having been stored for some years in Basford Hall yard, out of use. The final public appearance of ADB977191 was at the Crewe Works Open Day, on 21 May 2000, following which it was scrapped.

== Preservation ==
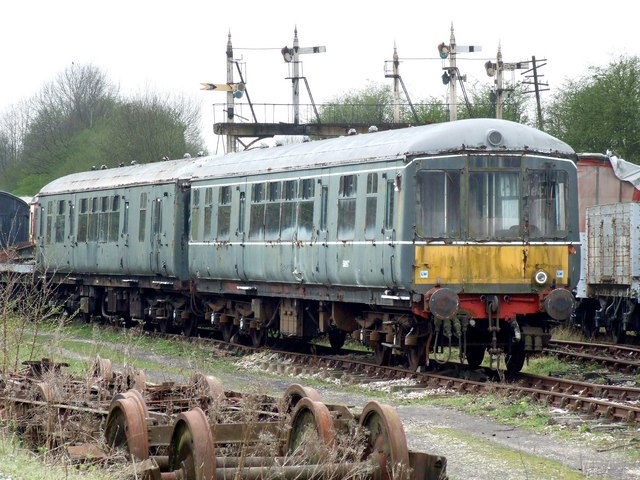
Class 100, 56097/51118 at Swanwick Junction at the Midland Railway Centre

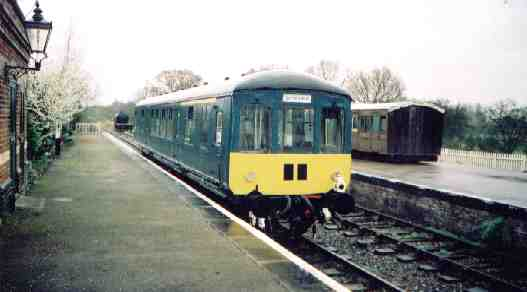
Class 100, no. 56301 at County School Station on the Mid-Norfolk Railway in 2001. This unit was the first heritage DMU vehicle to enter preservation.

Following their withdrawal from service in East Anglia, in 1973, DMBSs 50341 and 51118, together with DTCLs 56097 and 56099, were acquired by the North Yorkshire Moors Railway, where they were painted in green and cream and given the numbers D10, D11, D20 and D21. They finally became redundant in the mid-1980s and were disposed of.

The class has not fared well in preservation. Six cars entered preservation, now only half of which still exist. 50341 and 56099 were preserved by the West Somerset Railway, but were scrapped & dismantled in 1991. The National Railway Museum had intended to preserve 53355 (ex 50355), but a lack of space prevented this car, and the Class 105 coupled to it from being moved to York and they were vandalised beyond repair at Crewe. DTCL 56317 was scrapped in October 2016.

Number	Vehicle type	Location
51118	DMBS	Midland Railway – Butterley
56097	DTCL	Midland Railway – Butterley
56301	DTCL	Mid-Norfolk Railway, County School Station
