= Butterly =

Butterly is the name of:

- Caoimhe Butterly (born 1978), Irish human rights activist
- Kathy Butterly (born 1963), American sculptor
- Michelle Butterly (born 1970), English actress
- Butterly (1787 cricketer), English first-class cricketer
- The Butterly family, owners of various Dublin businesses, including the nightclub in the Stardust fire

== See also ==
- Butterleigh, Devon, England, a village
- Butterley (disambiguation)
