= Hammersmith station =

Hammersmith station may refer to:

- The following stations in Hammersmith, west London:
  - Hammersmith tube station (District and Piccadilly lines), a London Underground station served by the District and Piccadilly lines
  - Hammersmith tube station (Circle and Hammersmith & City lines), a London Underground station served by the Circle and Hammersmith & City lines
  - Hammersmith (Grove Road) railway station, a former station that closed in 1916
- Hammersmith railway station in Hammersmith, Derbyshire
- Hammersmith and Chiswick railway station, a former station located in Chiswick that closed to passengers in 1917 and to goods in 1965.
