= Butterley Reservoir, Derbyshire =

Surface reservoir originally used to fill a canal

Butterley Reservoir
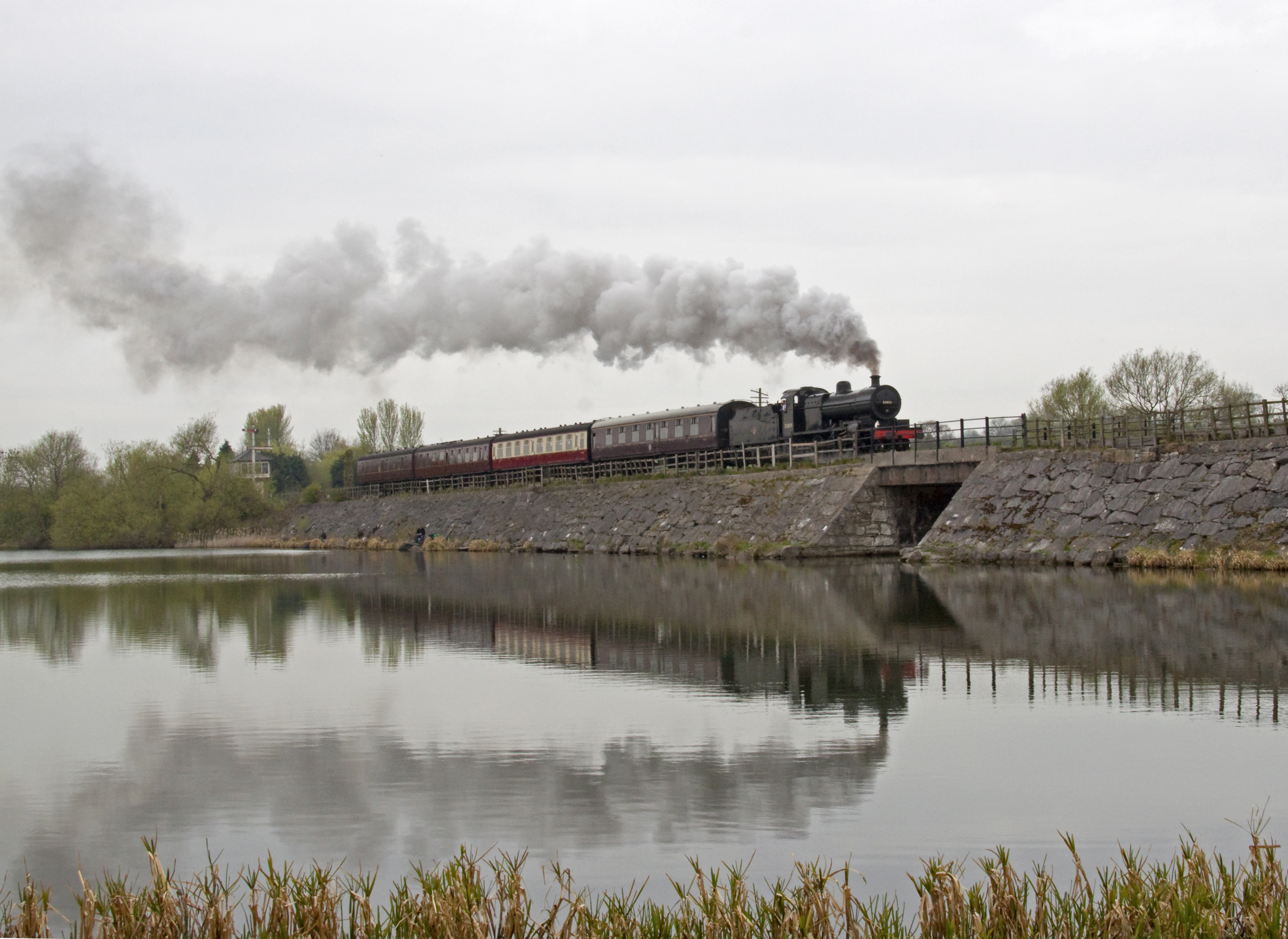

- Location within Derbyshire
- Location: Derbyshire
- Coordinates: 53°3′50.00″N 1°24′13.00″W
- Type: reservoir
- Basin countries: United Kingdom

Butterley Reservoir is a reservoir in Derbyshire, England. The reservoir was built to provide water for the Cromford Canal which opened for use in 1794. The Codnor Park and Butterley Park reservoirs also provided water to the Cromford Canal.

The line of the Cromford Canal passes beneath the reservoir along the Butterley Tunnel. When the canal tunnel was in use, water was provided to the canal directly from the reservoir via an adit which connects to the Butterley tunnel.

The reservoir is crossed by a causeway on the Midland Railway - Butterley's line between Butterley railway station and Hammersmith railway station, the latter being a new creation.

A variety of waterfowl can be seen on the reservoir, and fishing is allowed with a permit.
