= Butterley =

Village in Derbyshire, England

Coordinates: 53.061°N 1.403°W

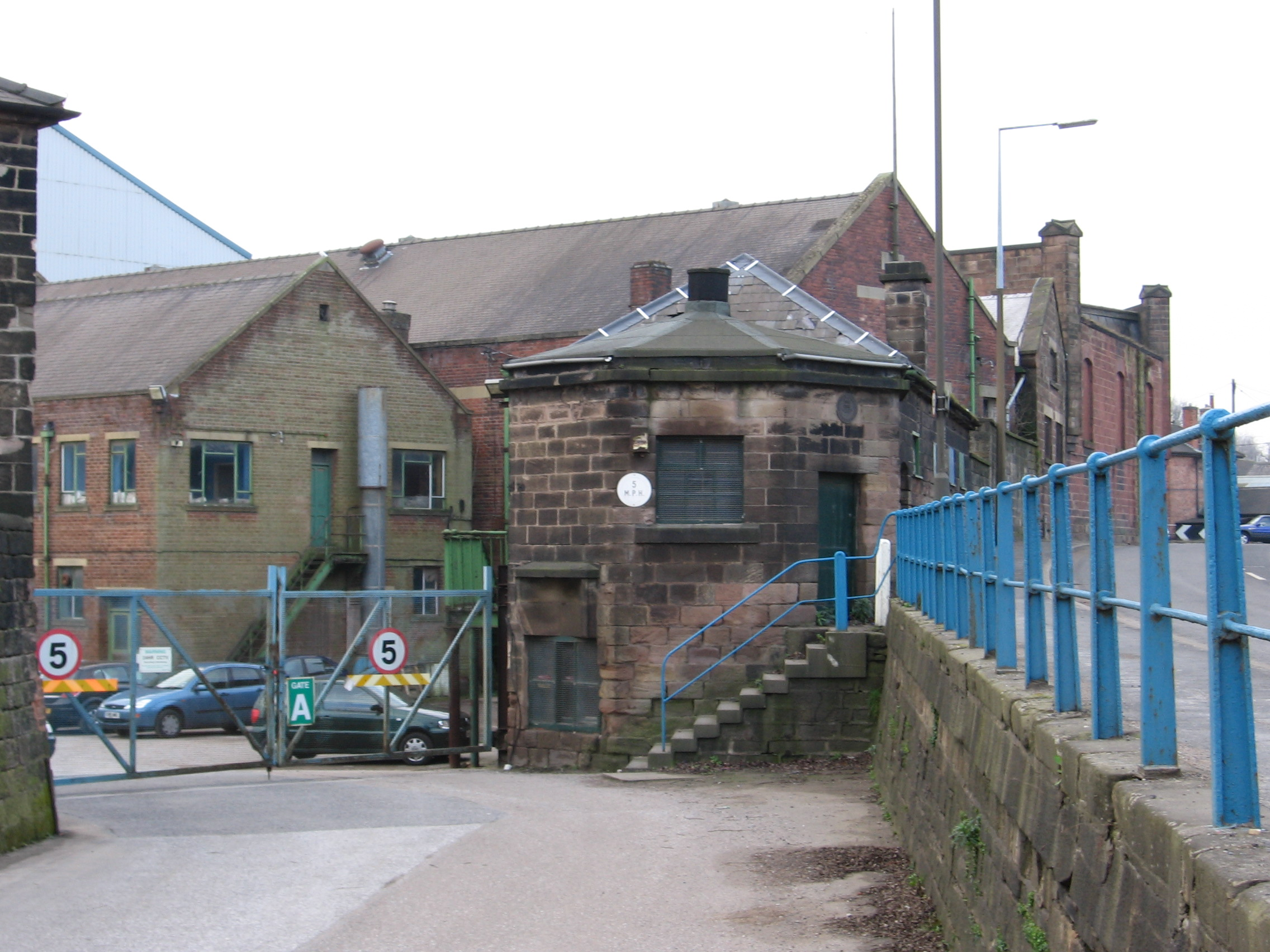
- Butterley works entrance

- Location within Derbyshire
- OS grid reference: SK401517
- Civil parish: Ripley
- District: Amber Valley
- Shire county: Derbyshire
- Region: East Midlands
- Country: England
- Sovereign state: United Kingdom
- Post town: RIPLEY
- Postcode district: DE5
- Police: Derbyshire
- Fire: Derbyshire
- Ambulance: East Midlands

Butterley is a village in the civil parish of Ripley, in the Amber Valley district, in the county of Derbyshire, England. The area is dominated by the now disused site of the Butterley Company and the Butterley Reservoir. It is the headquarters of the Midland Railway – Butterley, located at the site of the Butterley Railway Station.

The B6179 travels through the village with Swanwick to the north and Ripley to the south. The A610 Ripley Bypass passes through the area.

The Derbyshire Constabulary and Derbyshire Fire and Rescue Service headquarters are located at Butterley Hall.

== Notable residents ==
- Sir James Outram, hero of the Indian Mutiny, was born at Butterley Hall in 1803.
- Harry Storer Sr., goalkeeper for Arsenal F.C. and Liverpool F.C., was born here in 1870.
- William Storer, professional cricketer for Derbyshire, was born here in 1867.

== See also ==
- Butterley Company
- Butterley Hall
- Butterley Reservoir
- Butterley Tunnel
- Listed buildings in Ripley, Derbyshire
