= Swanwick Junction railway station =

Railway station in Derbyshire, England

Swanwick Junction
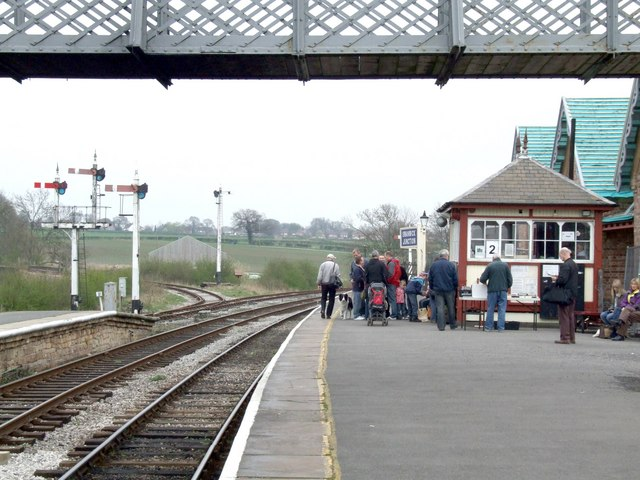

General information
- Location: Riddings, Amber Valley; England
- Coordinates: 53°3′50″N 1°23′2″W
- Grid reference: SK414520
- System: Station on heritage railway
- Platforms: 4

History
- Original company: Midland Railway - Butterley

Key dates
- 1968: Closure of Ambergate to Pye Bridge Line
- ?: Station opened
Location

Swanwick Junction railway station (pronounced "Swannick") is a heritage railway station situated on the former Ambergate to Pye Bridge Line which closed in 1968, but has been partially reopened by the Midland Railway - Butterley. Despite the station's name it is some distance from Swanwick.

Previously, there was originally no station here (during BR/LMS days), only a junction with the Swanwick Colliery Branch Line. However, when the line was restored, Swanwick campus was the centre for the main activities of the Midland Railway - Butterley, and the station gives access to the attractions there. The station itself is within walking distance of Butterley railway station to the west.

The station has four platforms. Platform No. 1 is the southernmost and is a bay platform. Platform No. 2 is the main platform in use and is a side platform.

On platforms 1 and 2, the ex-Midland station building from Syston railway station in Leicestershire has been rebuilt. In addition, there is an island platform with Platform Nos 3 and 4. The building here is a replica of that at Broom Junction railway station.

Platform No. 4 is the only platform which can serve the Swanwick Colliery Branch, with DMU shuttles, demonstration goods trains or footplate experience locomotives running from this platform up the branch on gala days.

In 2013, a footbridge linking platforms 1 and 2 to platforms 3 and 4 was completed; this was originally located at Belle Vue railway station. Wheelchair access is provided by means of a foot crossing at the west end of the platform.

The signal box originally comes from Kettering railway station in Northamptonshire.

There is currently no station further east of Swanwick Junction, though trains continue to a run-round loop at Riddings situated on the northern branch of a triangle with the Midland Main Line, close by. The MR-B has stated an ambition to build a new station at the loop as well as to reopen the site of Pye Bridge railway station as the preserved line's eastern terminus.

The station is the main location of the Indietracks music festival.

| Preceding station | Heritage railways | Following station |
|---|---|---|
| Butterley towards Hammersmith | Midland Railway – Butterley | Terminus |
