= Butterley Tunnel =

Canal tunnel on the Cromford Canal

Coordinates: 53°3.3841′N 1°22.3994′W

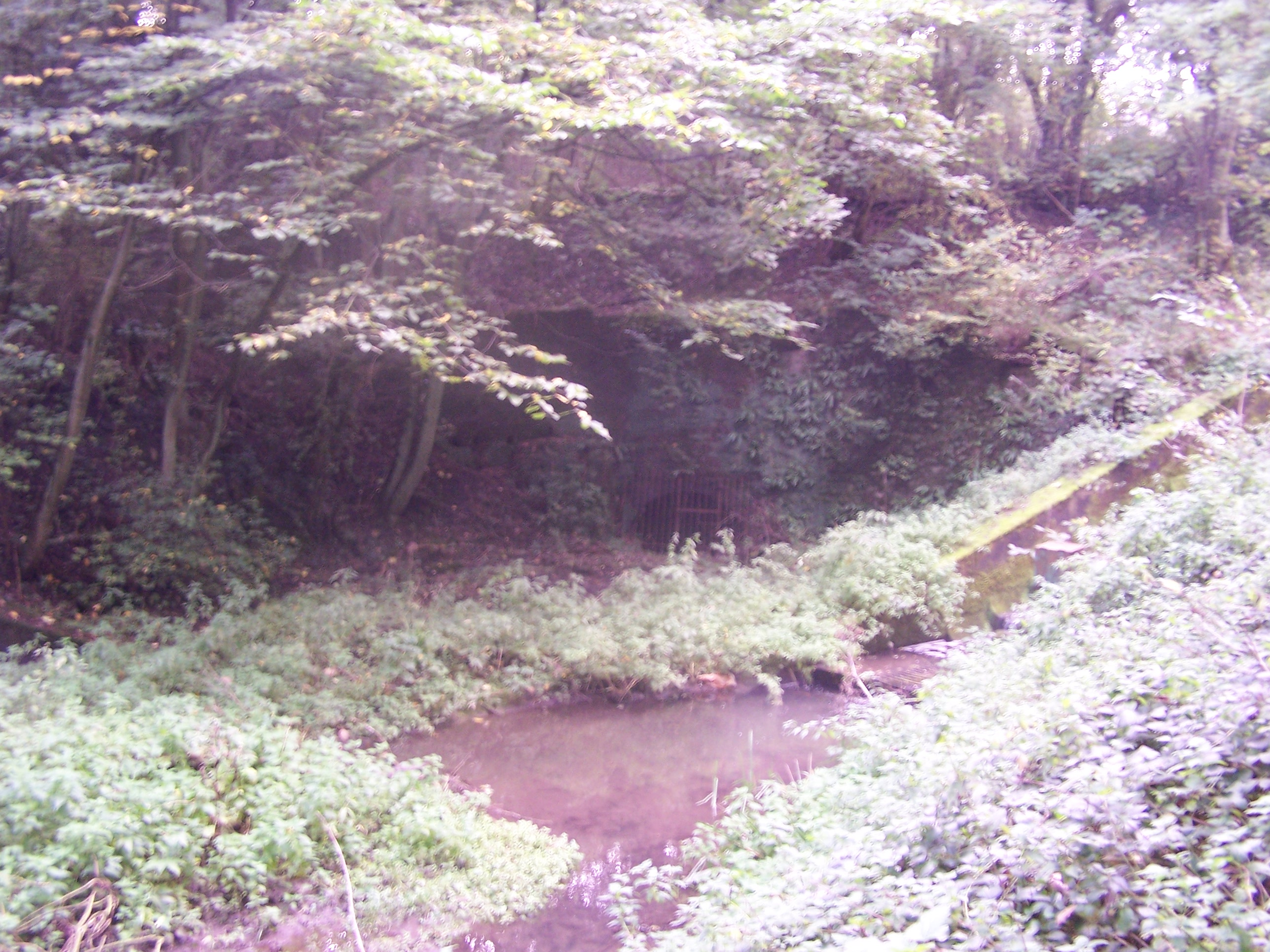
- Eastern portal of Butterley Tunnel, 2006
- Interactive map of Butterley Tunnel

Overview
- Location: Near Ripley, Derbyshire
- Status: Closed
- Waterway: Cromford Canal

Operation
- Opened: 1794
- Rebuilt: 1900
- Owner: Cromford Canal Company / Midland Railway Company

Technical
- Length: 3,083 yards (2,819 m)
- Tunnel clearance: 8 ft (2.4 m)
- Towpath: No

Butterley Tunnel is a 3,083-yard (2,819 m) disused canal tunnel on the Cromford Canal below Ripley, in Derbyshire, England, opened to traffic in 1794. Along with Butterley Works blast furnaces, part of the canal tunnel and its underground wharf were declared a scheduled monument in 2013.

== Origins ==
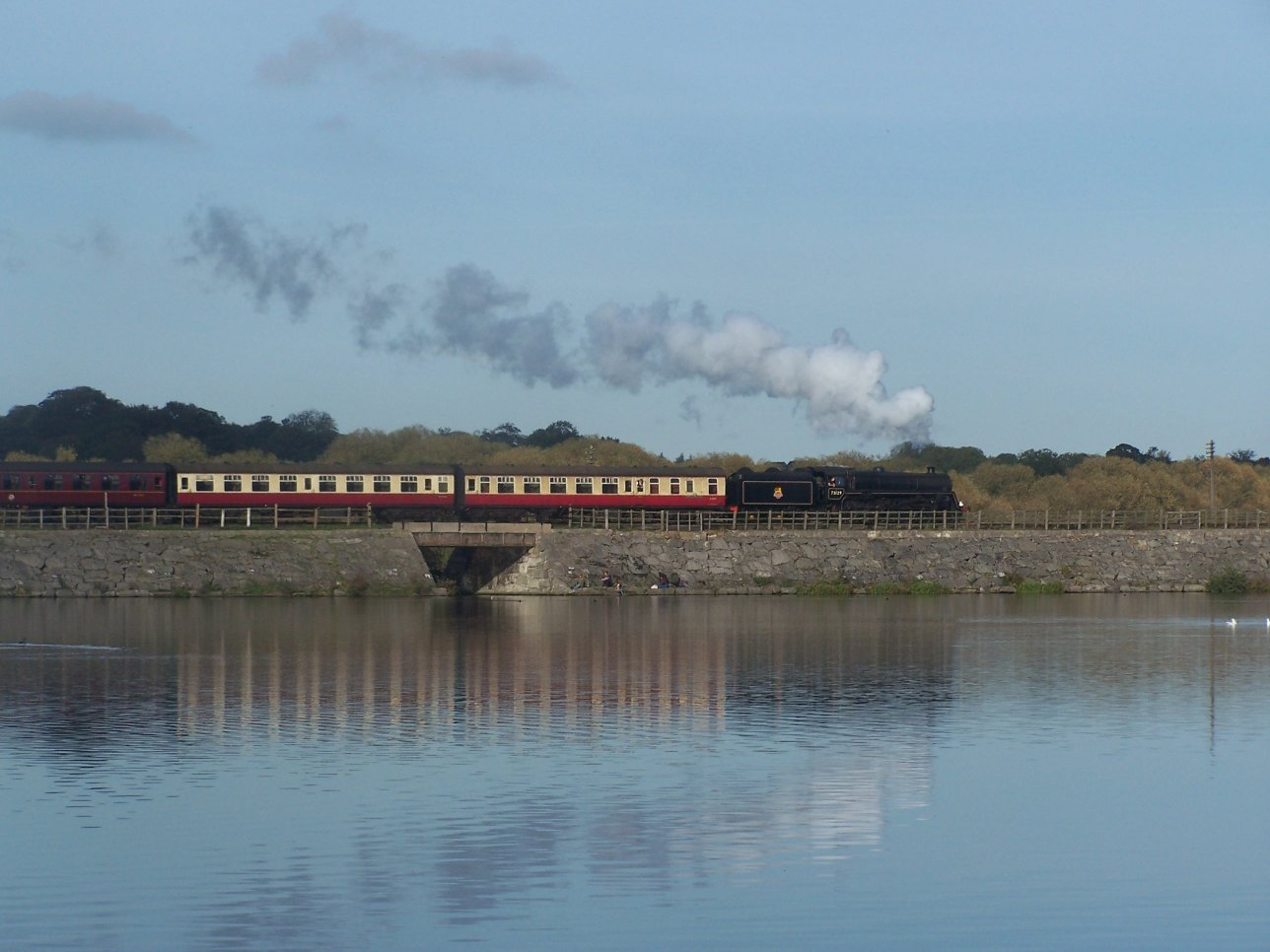
The Midland Railway – Butterley's mainline steam locomotive, ex-British Rail 4-6-0 Class 5MT 73129 crossing the stone causeway over Butterley Reservoir

The tunnel was 2,966 yard (2712m) long, 9 ft (2.7 m) wide at water level, and 8 ft (2.4 m) from water to soffit (depending on the water level). At the time of building it was the third longest canal tunnel in the World after Sapperton and Dudley. Thirty-three shafts were sunk during construction with the workings dewatered using a Woodhouse steam engine. Water was provided for the Cromford Canal from the 50-acre (200,000 m^{2}) Butterley Reservoir situated on the hill above the tunnel. The Butterley Reservoir is itself crossed by a stone railway embankment currently used by the locomotives of the Midland Railway - Butterley's preserved steam railway. Water flowed from the reservoir directly into the tunnel via an adit 600 yards (550 m) along the tunnel from the western portal. Above the eastern portal the Butterley Park Reservoir once provided water to the canal. This Reservoir was filled in during 1935. Both the tunnel and reservoirs were constructed by the Butterley Company, formed in 1790 by Benjamin Outram (1764–1805) and Francis Beresford (died 1801) with William Jessop (1745–1814) and John Wright (1758–1840) joining by 1793.

There is no towpath within the tunnel, which was for the most part only 9 feet (2.7 m) wide, therefore narrow boats were propelled through the tunnel using the muscle power of the narrow boat's crew. This process is called legging. (The external link listed below shows men legging It through Butterley Tunnel.)

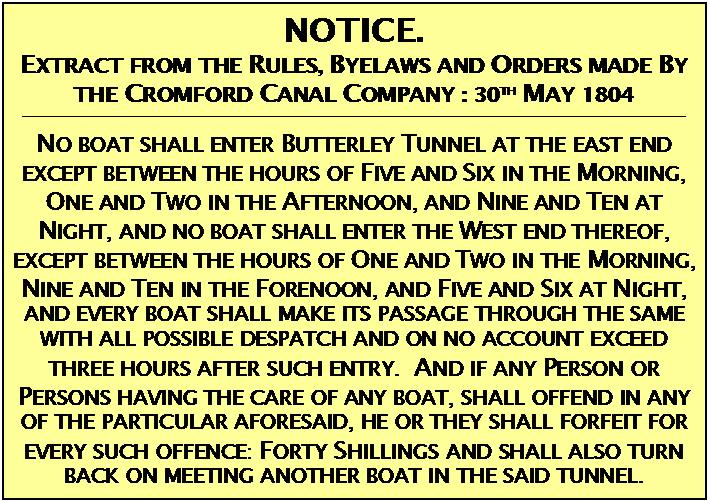
Sign displayed at both ends of the tunnel

The sign illustrated (left) was displayed at both ends of the tunnel, and stressed the importance of only using the tunnel in any one direction at particular times. There are reported instances of fines levied for non-compliance with these rules.

== Underground wharf ==
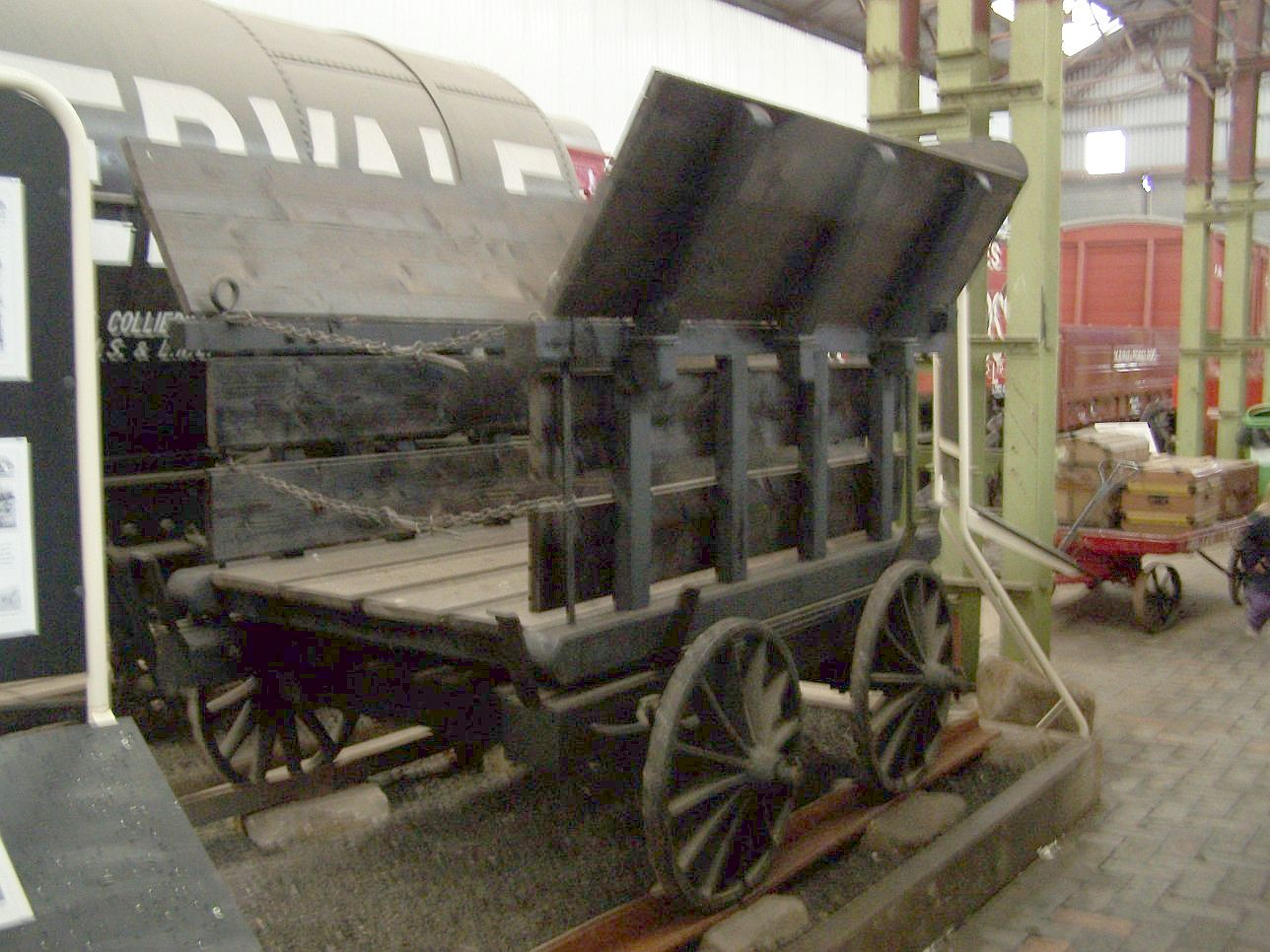
Replica of a Little Eaton Tramway wagon. The box can be detached. Similar boxes were lowered down and raised up the loading shafts in Butterley Tunnel

About 880 yards (800 m) from the tunnel's western portal there is an underground wharf about 60 yards (55 m) long with the tunnel here widened to about 16 feet (4.9 m). One of the horizontal tunnels departing from the tunnel at this point used to run to the Butterley Company's Butterley Carr Pit which opened in 1812 and loaded its coal directly into narrow boats at the underground wharf. There were also vertical shafts from the wharf which allowed goods in tram boxes to be lowered directly from and lifted up to the Butterley Company's works (on the hill above the tunnel) to and from the underground wharf. These tram boxes were used by Benjamin Outram on the Little Eaton Tramway. The box could be lifted from the tram chassis and loaded directly into narrow boats or barges on the Derby Canal. Similar designs were used in other undertakings in which Benjamin Outram had an interest. Initially the boxes were lowered with the aid of a large water bucket descending or ascending a parallel shaft to act as a counterbalance. This system was later replaced by a steam engine winding the boxes up and down the shafts. Reputable sources cited here consider the presence and mode of use of this underground wharf to be if not unique, extremely rare within the United Kingdom.

In the mid-1980s, demolition of the Butterley Company's old foundry buildings exposed the original blast furnace, dating to 1790. In front of the furnace is at least one vertical shaft, now capped off, which leads down to a short tunnel which connects with the canal tunnel close to the wharf area. Additionally, a number of deep drains below these buildings probably link to the canal tunnel. The site is now occupied by Butterley Engineering, one of the successors to the Butterley Company, and noted for its involvement in the construction of the Falkirk Wheel.

== Decline in use ==
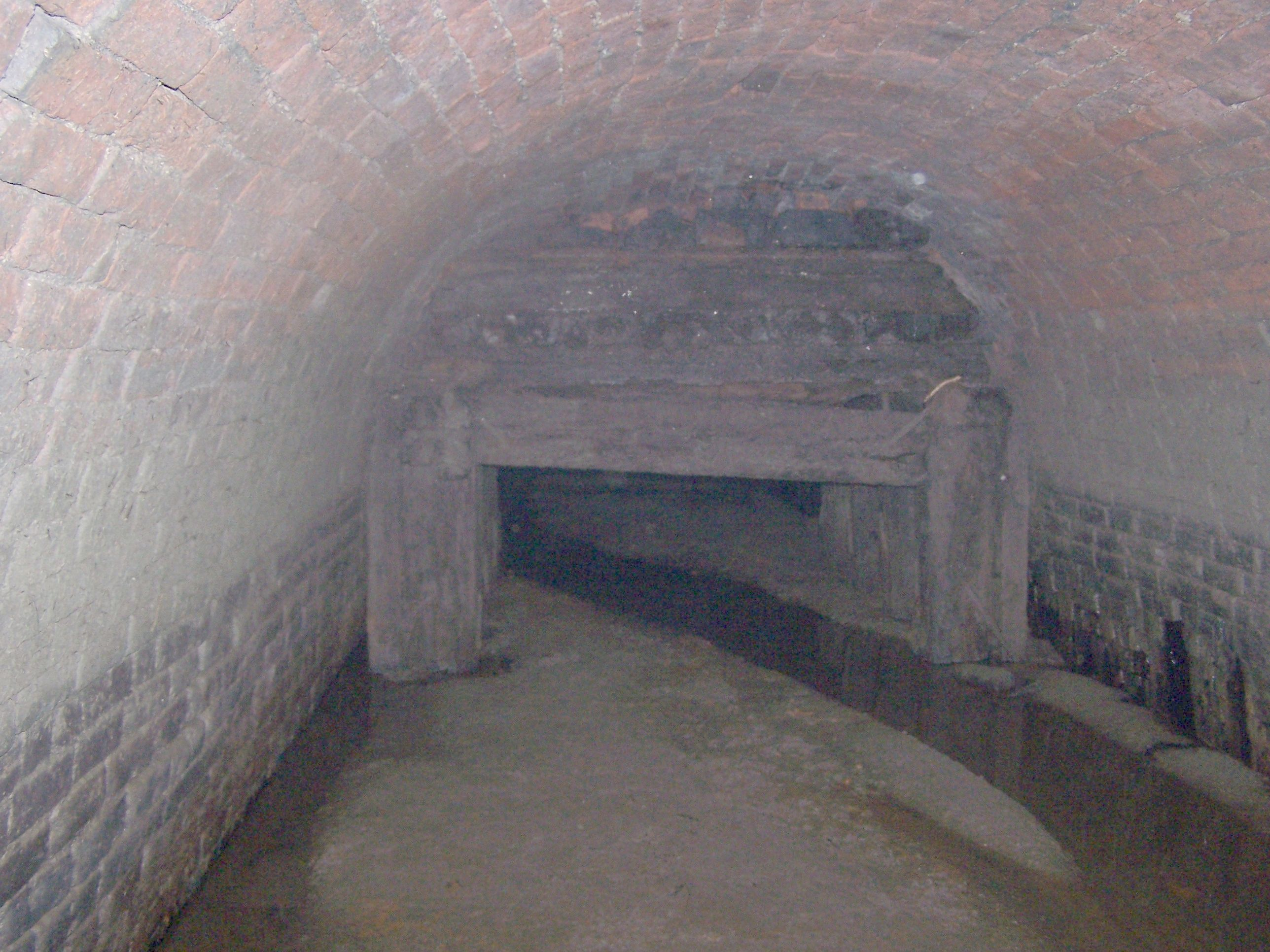
Tunnel roof supported by timbers about 60 yards (55 m) from east portal, 2006

In 1889 subsidence caused the tunnel to be closed for a period of four years with the tunnel reopening after repairs in 1893. This closure resulted in the permanent loss of some of the canal's customers to competing railway companies. A partial collapse of the Butterley Tunnel in 1900 due to mining related subsidence split the Cromford Canal into two. The tunnel has not yet been repaired. Rudolph de Salis undertook a government funded survey of the tunnel in 1904 but his report was not favourable. Rudolph de Salis was a director of Fellows Morton & Clayton, a prominent canal freight company. A third tunnel collapse in 1907 and a government report by Sir William Matthews KCMG in June 1907 ended hopes of repairing the tunnel at this time and the tunnel was pronounced beyond economical repair in 1909. Commercial traffic on the canal ceased in 1944.

== After closure ==
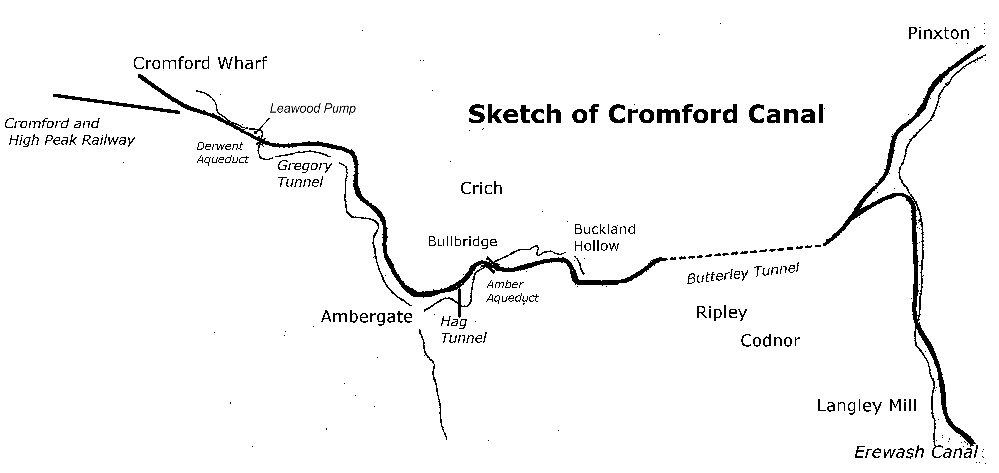
Sketch map showing Butterley Tunnel in context with the rest of the Cromford Canal

"The Friends of Cromford Canal" is a group of volunteers whose aim is to fully restore the Cromford Canal and the Butterley Tunnel. A horse drawn narrowboat is brought into service by "The Friends of Cromford Canal" occasionally on the only navigable section of the Cromford Canal near to the Derbyshire village of Cromford itself.

The tunnel has been extended twice since it was originally built. The Midland Railway's Ripley to Heanor branch was built across the front of the western portal with a new section of tunnel passing underneath bringing the total length at this time to 3063 yards (2801m). After the tunnel's closure the A38 road was built over the old railway track. The extra width required by the road brought about the introduction of an extra 6-foot-8-inch (2.03 m) wide, 20-yard (18 m) long cylindrical culvert to the Western end of the tunnel bringing the new length to about 3083 yards (2819m).

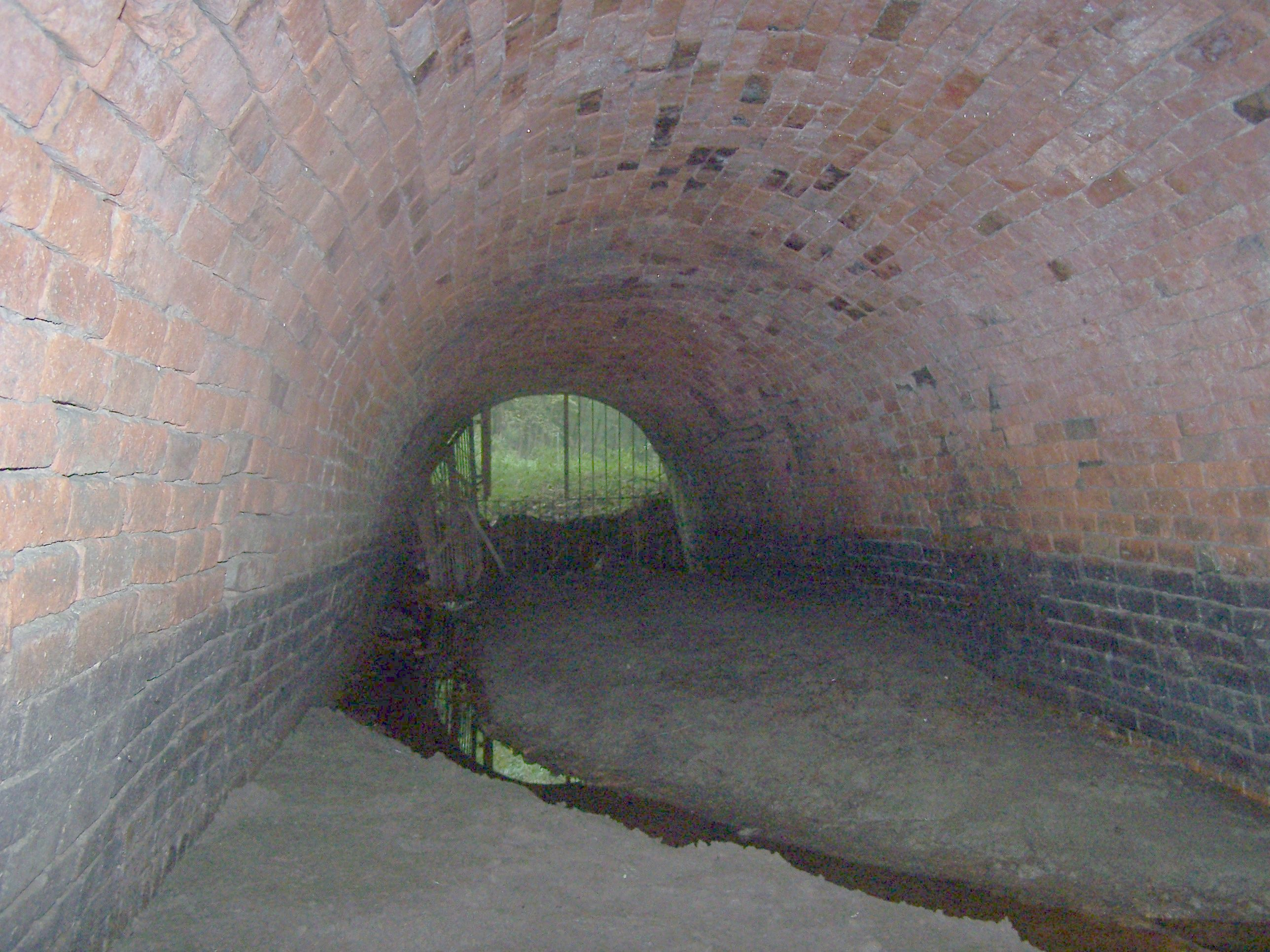
View from inside Butterley Tunnel, 2006

The Golden Valley Light Railway (GVLR) passes less than 30 yards (27 m) North of the tunnel's eastern portal. This 24-inch (610 mm) narrow gauge railway terminates at a station behind Newlands Inn approximately 100 yards (91 m) East of the Butterley Tunnel's eastern portal. This section of the GVLR's track crosses the site of the Butterley Park Reservoir. The GVLR operates for the benefit of tourists and is part of the Midland Railway - Butterley. The Newlands Inn served the Cromford Canal as a place where the narrow boat horses were changed and probably where the narrow boat crews were refreshed prior to or after legging it through the tunnel.

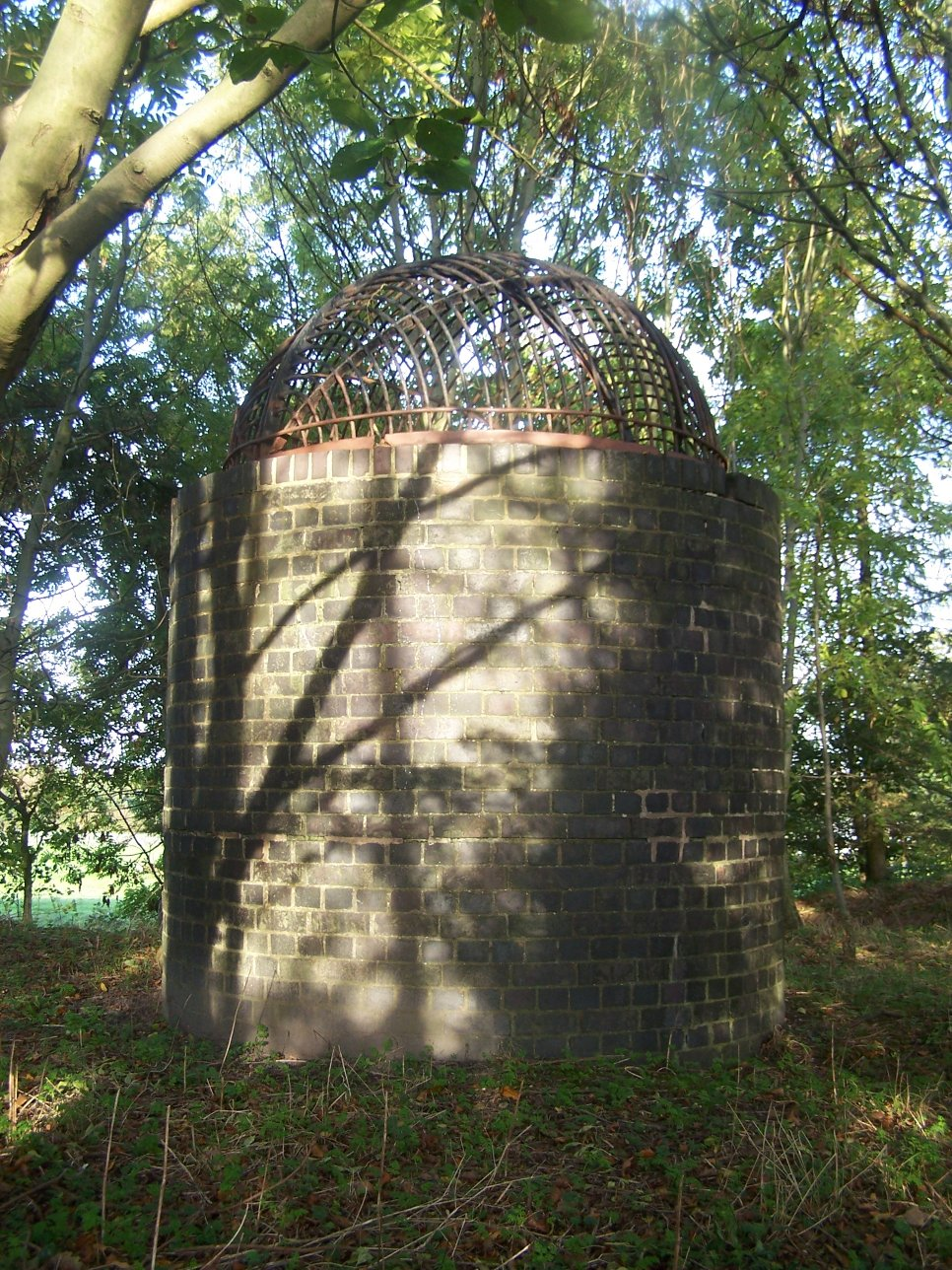
View of the second air shaft on the Butterley Tunnel line

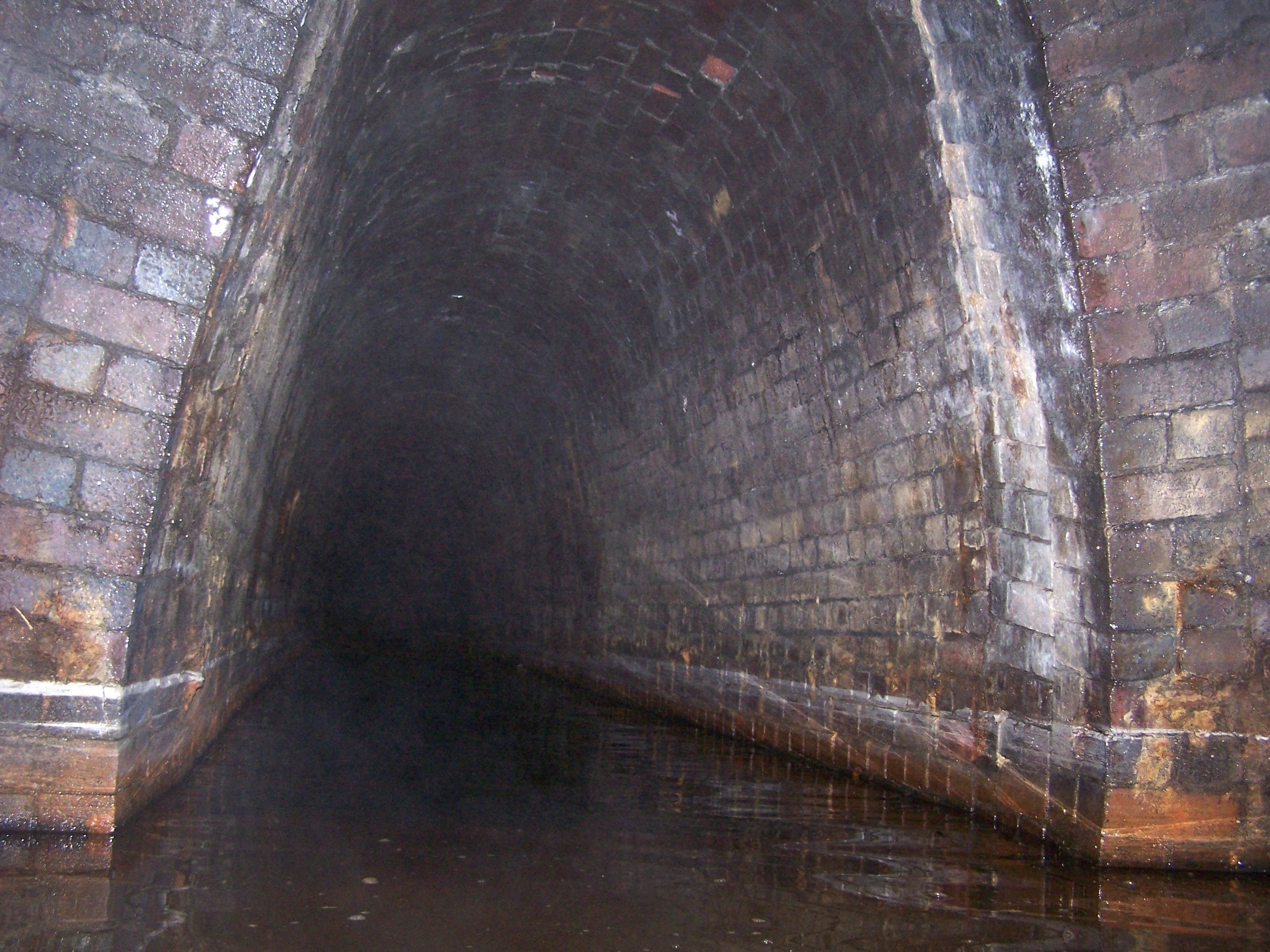
The Butterley Reservoir adit where it enters the Butterley Tunnel about 600 yards (550 m) along the tunnel from the western portal in 2006

== See also ==
- List of canal tunnels in Great Britain
- Butterley
- Butterley Company
- Worsley Navigable Levels
- Speedwell Cavern
- Wet Earth Colliery
