= Codnor Park and Ironville railway station =

Former railway station in Derbyshire, England

Codnor Park and Ironville
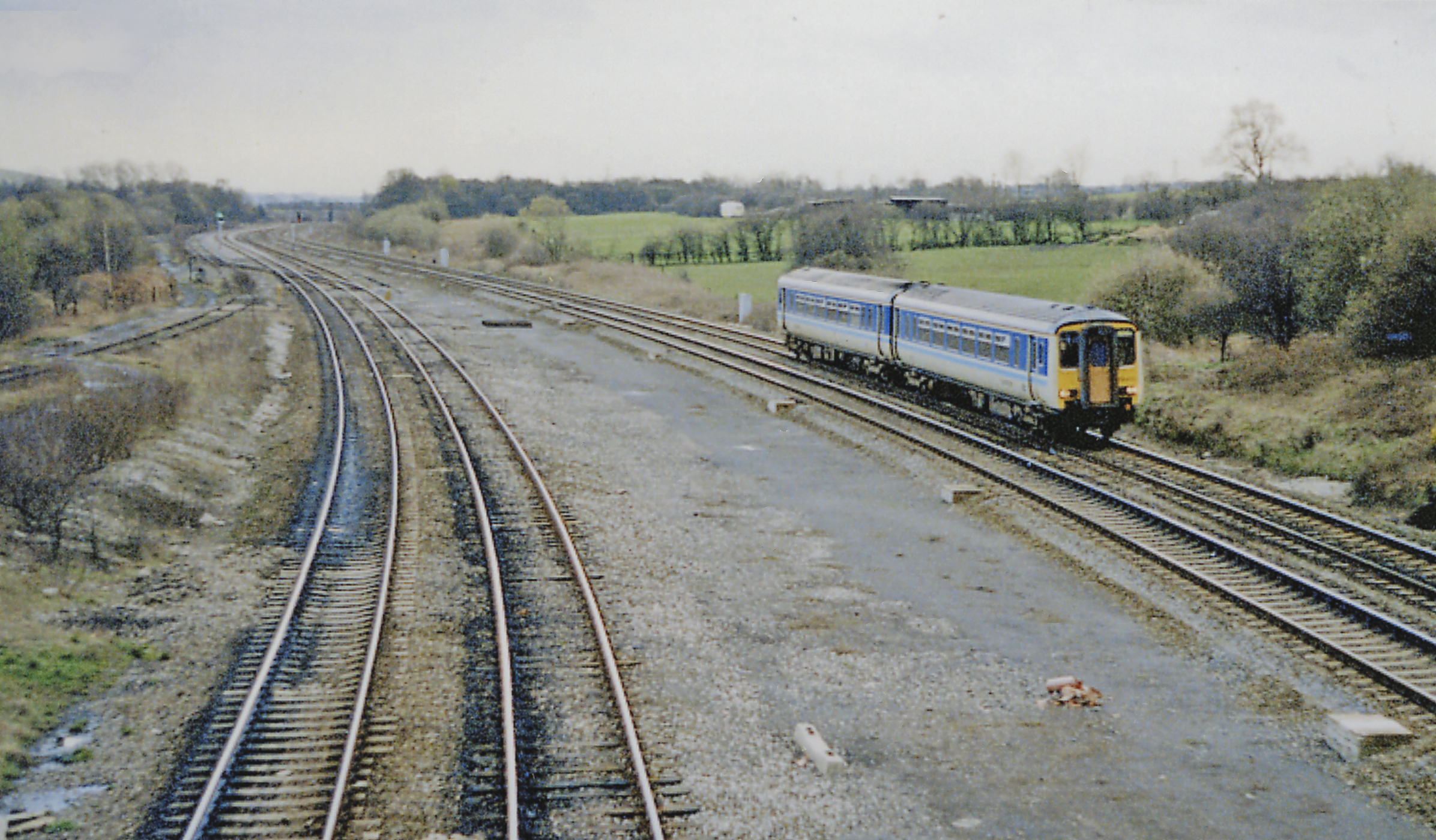
- A Class 156 near the site of the station in 1989

General information
- Location: Ashfield; England
- Coordinates: 53.0563°N 1.345°W
- Grid reference: SK440512
- Platforms: 2

Other information
- Status: Disused

History
- Original company: Midland Railway
- Pre-grouping: Midland Railway
- Post-grouping: London, Midland and Scottish Railway

Key dates
- 6 September 1847: Opened
- 2 January 1967: Closed
Location

Codnor Park and Ironville railway station served the villages of Codnor Park and Ironville, Derbyshire, England from 1847 to 1967 on the Erewash Valley Line.

== History ==
The station opened on 6 September 1847 by the Midland Railway. It closed to both passengers and goods traffic on 2 January 1967.

== Stationmasters ==
- Francis Millington ca. 1857
- Richard Smedley before 1859
- W. Briero ca. 1859 - ca. 1866
- John Ashton ca. 1871 - 1876 (afterwards station master at Matlock Bridge)
- Endersbye Chapman 1876 - 1885
- William Grant 1885 - 1890 (formerly station master at Sharnbrook)
- George Henry Ward 1890 - 1895
- William Frederick Best 1895 - 1905 (formerly station master at Whitwell, afterwards station master at Pye Bridge)
- Albert C. East 1905 - 1907 (formerly station master at Kimberley)
- Edward Henry Baldwin 1907 - ca. 1914 (formerly station master at Didsbury)
- Harold Smith
- G. Cook until 1922 (afterwards station master at Ilkeston)
- Lewis James Oldham 1922 - 1929
- John Hitchens 1929 - 1937 (afterwards station master at Pye Bridge)
- William Henry Smart from 1937 (formerly station master at Blakesley)
- Albert Edward Ganderton until 1954
- Sigard Weatherill from 1955

Preceding station	Historical railways	Following station
Pye Bridge; Line open, station closed	Midland Railway; Erewash Valley Line	Shipley Gate; Line open, station closed
