= Hammersmith railway station =

Re-created station as a dead-end railway terminus

Hammersmith
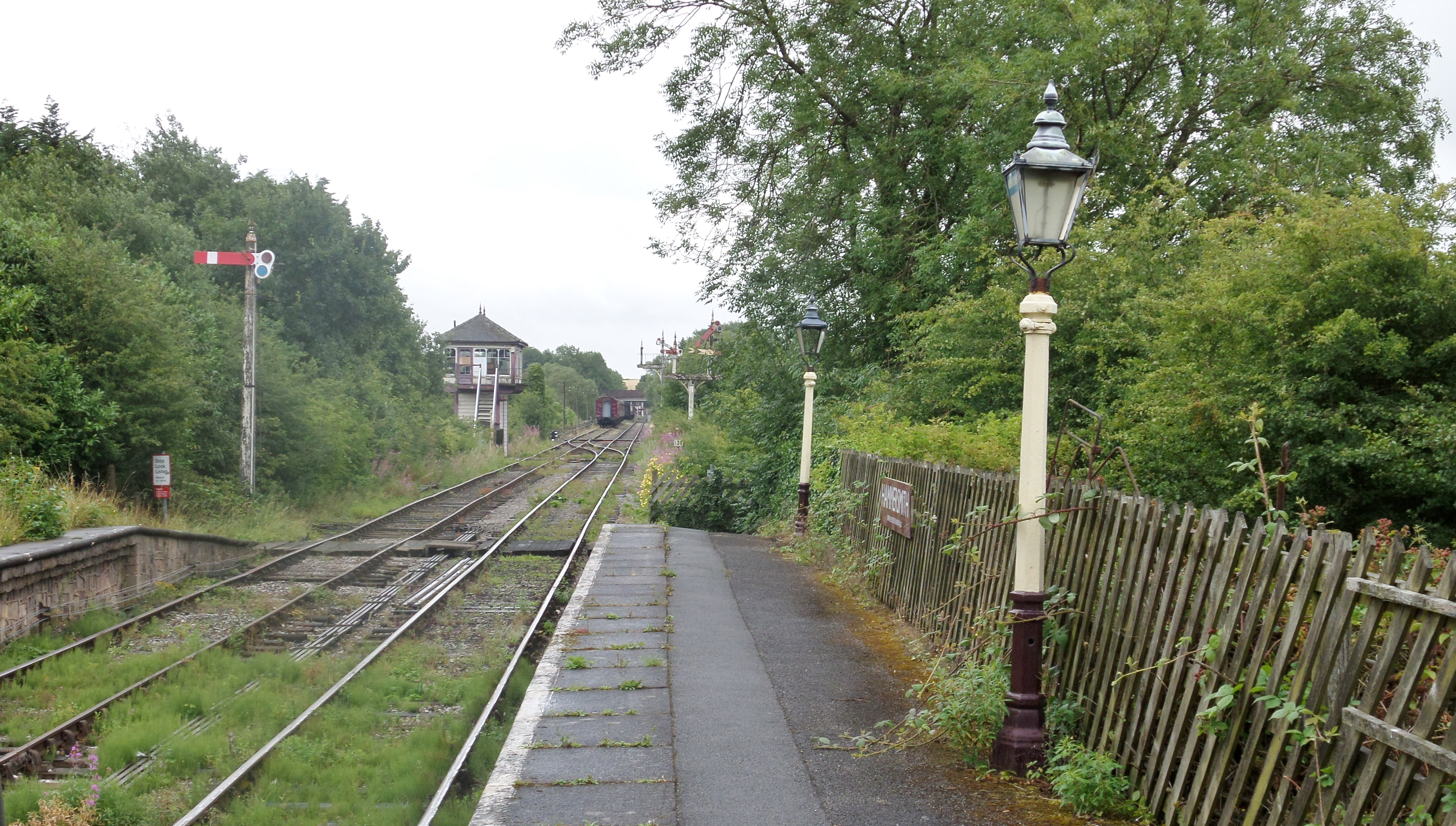
- View towards Butterley.

General information
- Location: Hammersmith, Amber Valley; England
- Coordinates: 53°3′47″N 1°24′32″W
- Grid reference: SK396519
- System: Station on heritage railway
- Operator: Midland Railway – Butterley
- Platforms: 1

Key dates
- 1968: Closure of Ambergate–Pye Bridge line
- ?: Station opened
Location

Hammersmith railway station is a heritage railway station on the Midland Railway – Butterley in Derbyshire.

There was no station at this point originally, being situated on the Ambergate–Pye Bridge line. However, when the line was reopened, the A38 road prevented any further westward extension.

Hammersmith is used as terminus with a run-around loop. Trains normally proceed from here eastwards without stopping at Butterley railway station which they left a few minutes previously. The location of the terminus allows passengers to cross the causeway over Butterley Reservoir.

There is no vehicular access at this point although a public footpath runs across the end of the platform; passengers are instead advised to use Butterley railway station.

The signal box at Hammersmith was originally at Kilby Bridge in Leicestershire. Built in 1900, it was closed by British Rail on 29 June 1986 and moved to the Centre in August 1986. It was re-erected at Hammersmith in 1987 and commissioned in September 1989. It is a standard Midland Railway type 3B box.

Preceding station	Heritage railways	Following station
Terminus	Midland Railway – Butterley	Butterley towards Swanwick Junction
