= Midland Railway – Butterley =

Railway heritage centre in Derbyshire, England

Coordinates: 53.0632°N 1.3993°W

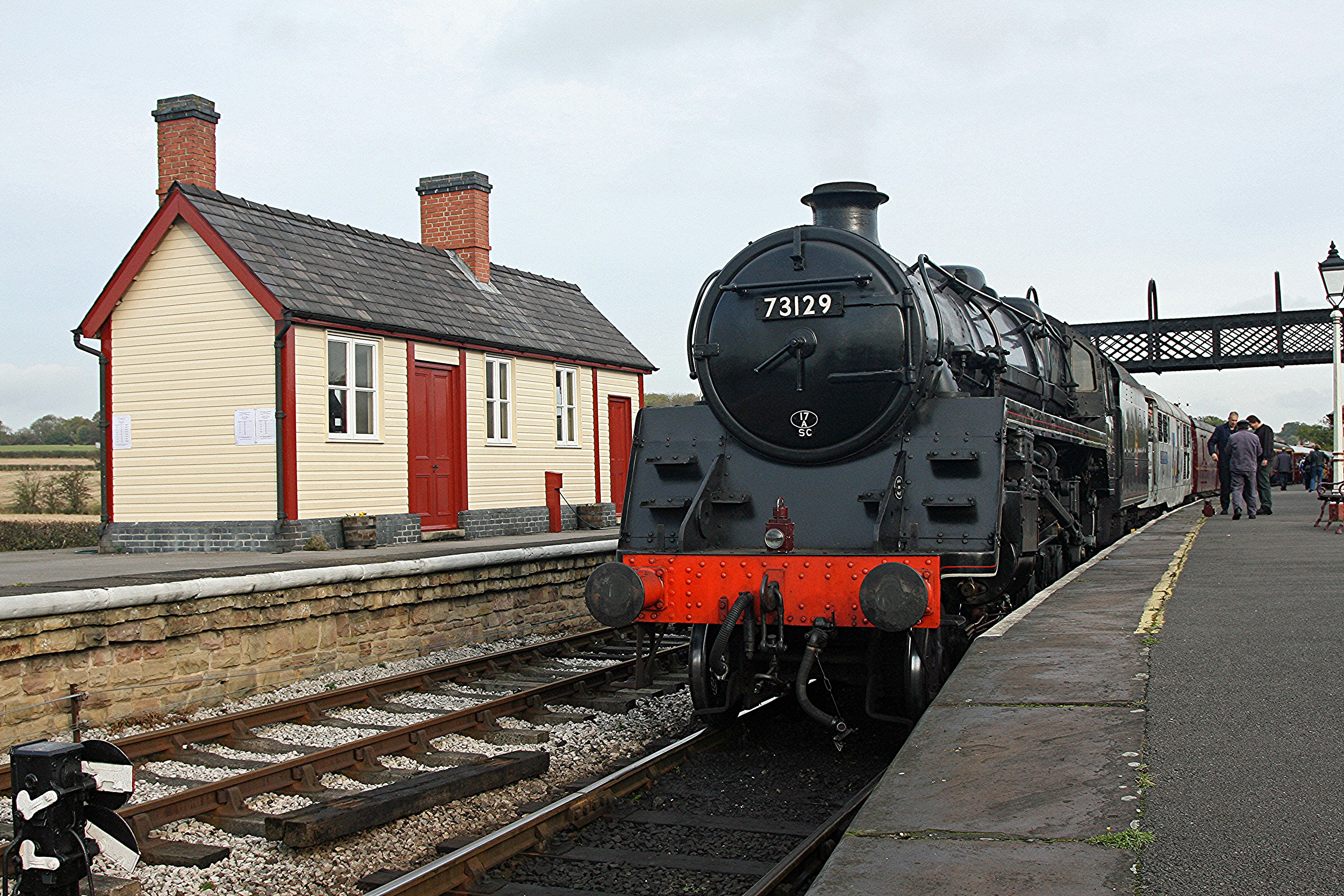
- British Railways Standard 5 no. 73129 at Swanwick Junction
- Terminus: Hammersmith and Pye Bridge

Commercial operations
- Name: Ambergate to Pye Bridge Line
- Built by: Midland Railway
- Original gauge: 4 ft 8 1/2 in (1,435 mm) standard gauge

Preserved operations
- Owned by: Midland Railway Trust Ltd
- Operated by: Midland Railway Trust Ltd
- Stations: 3
- Length: 3 1/2 miles (5.6 km)
- Preserved gauge: 4 ft 8 1/2 in (1,435 mm) standard gauge

Commercial history
- Opened: 1 February 1875
- Closed to passengers: 23 December 1968
- Preserved era: Different eras on different days, but normally 19th century

Preservation history
- Headquarters: Butterley station

Website
- https://www.midlandrailway-butterley.co.uk/

The Midland Railway – Butterley is a heritage railway and museum complex at Butterley, near Ripley, in Derbyshire, England.

== History ==
=== Overview ===
The Midland Railway – Butterley lies on the Ambergate to Pye Bridge line of the old Midland Railway, a line once connecting the Derwent Valley branch of Midland Main Line to the Erewash Valley. A branch leading to the south to Ripley was in use from 1889 until 1923. The sole historical station on the line is Butterley, which opened in 1875.

The current line extends westwards from Codnor Park Junction on the Erewash Valley Line, although the present-day heritage line terminates at Hammersmith. The line currently runs for 3 1/2 miles (5.6 km) from Hammersmith to Ironville, via Butterley, Swanwick Junction and Riddings. It is operated and maintained by the Midland Railway Trust.

=== Operation ===
The Ambergate to Pye Bridge line was used to serve the collieries of Marehay, Hartshay, Pentrich, Swanwick and Britain Pit; the current Swanwick Junction station lies on the former site of Brand's Colliery. The line also provided rail access for the site of the Butterley Company.

The railway is also home to the 2 ft (610 mm) narrow gauge Golden Valley Light Railway, which opened in 1991. It lies partially on the trackbed of a former plateway built by the Butterley Company in 1813 to connect its iron works facilities in Butterley to nearby Codnor Park.

=== Closure and restoration ===
The line was closed in 1968 and the process of restoring the line started in 1973. Much of the former trackbed was razed in 1976, when the nearby section of the A38 was constructed between Ripley and Alfreton; the route of the A610 between the Ripley roundabout and Buckland Hollow lies mostly on the route of the former line. The first preservation services started operating in 1981.

== Stations and attractions ==
=== Hammersmith ===
Hammersmith is the western terminus of the line; the station consists of two platforms and the secondary line is used as a run-around loop. A signal box is present at the eastern end of the station and the A38 is visible from the platform to the west.

=== Butterley ===
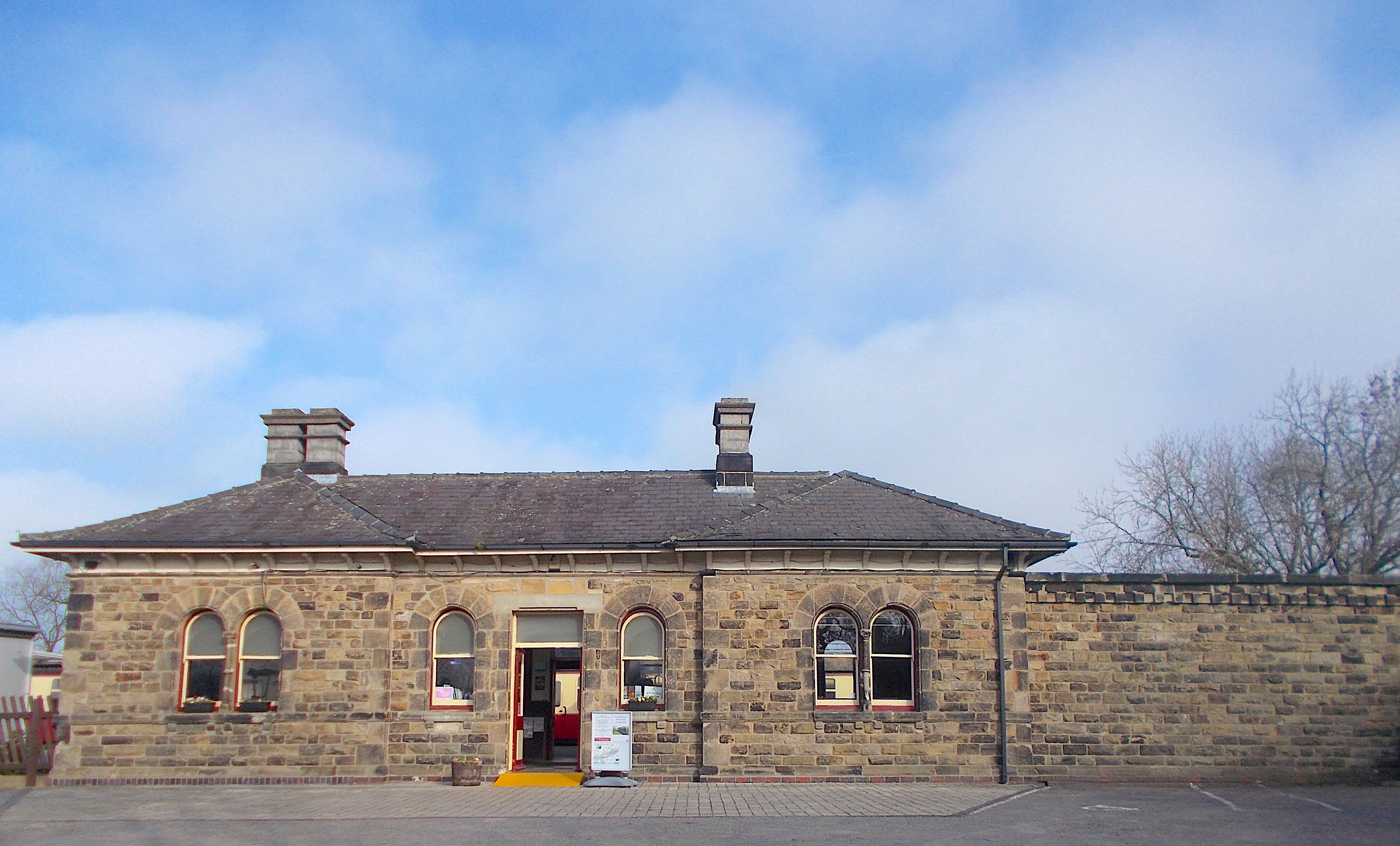
Butterley station

This is the headquarters and gateway to the Swanwick Junction site. It consists of a double platform and the station building; the original buildings were demolished after the line closed. The current station building is a near identical match to the one originally at Butterley and was transferred from Whitwell and built in place of the original.

The station building contains the gift shop and the booking office; a café and the Alfreton Model Railway Society are also present in adjacent buildings. The signal box at Butterley was formerly situated at Ais Gill on the Settle to Carlisle Line. A carriage shed also stands at the eastern end of the yard, neither the signal box or carriage shed are open to the public.

The Garden Railway is in the yard; it is an outdoor 16 mm scale model railway, which runs on most Sundays and some Saturdays. There is also the Star Tugs Trust carriage; a Mark 1 (no. BG 80590), which is owned by the Star Tugs trust and holds a permanent exhibition of some original models from TUGS, the sister show of Thomas & Friends. It is open on certain running days.

=== Swanwick Junction ===
Swanwick Junction site holds the main complex for the Midland Railway Centre.

- Station - it has four platforms; the station building was originally located at Syston and rebuilt on platform 2. The building contains toilets, café, waiting room and booking office. Between platforms 3 and 4 is a waiting room; this is a replica of the original station building at Broom Junction. There is currently only public access on certain events. The original building was intended to be used, but it was destroyed by vandals before recovery.
- Signal box – the operational signal box was moved from Kettering in 1988. There is no public access.
- Matthew Kirtley Museum – the main museum on the Swanwick site houses various locomotives, coaches and wagons.
- Historical Model Railway Society – this was opened in 2005. It contains a large display area, study centre and a small shop. Normally only open by appointment, it is sometimes opened at special events.
- The West Shed – the home of the Princess Royal Class Locomotive Trust, owners of 6233 Duchess of Sutherland and 46203 Princess Margaret Rose. BR Standard Class 4 Tanks 80080 and 80098, with a small collection of classic LMS saloons including the famous Dynamometer car, are also stationed here.
- St. Saviour's Church – moved from Westhouses, this Railwayman's church also holds occasional services.

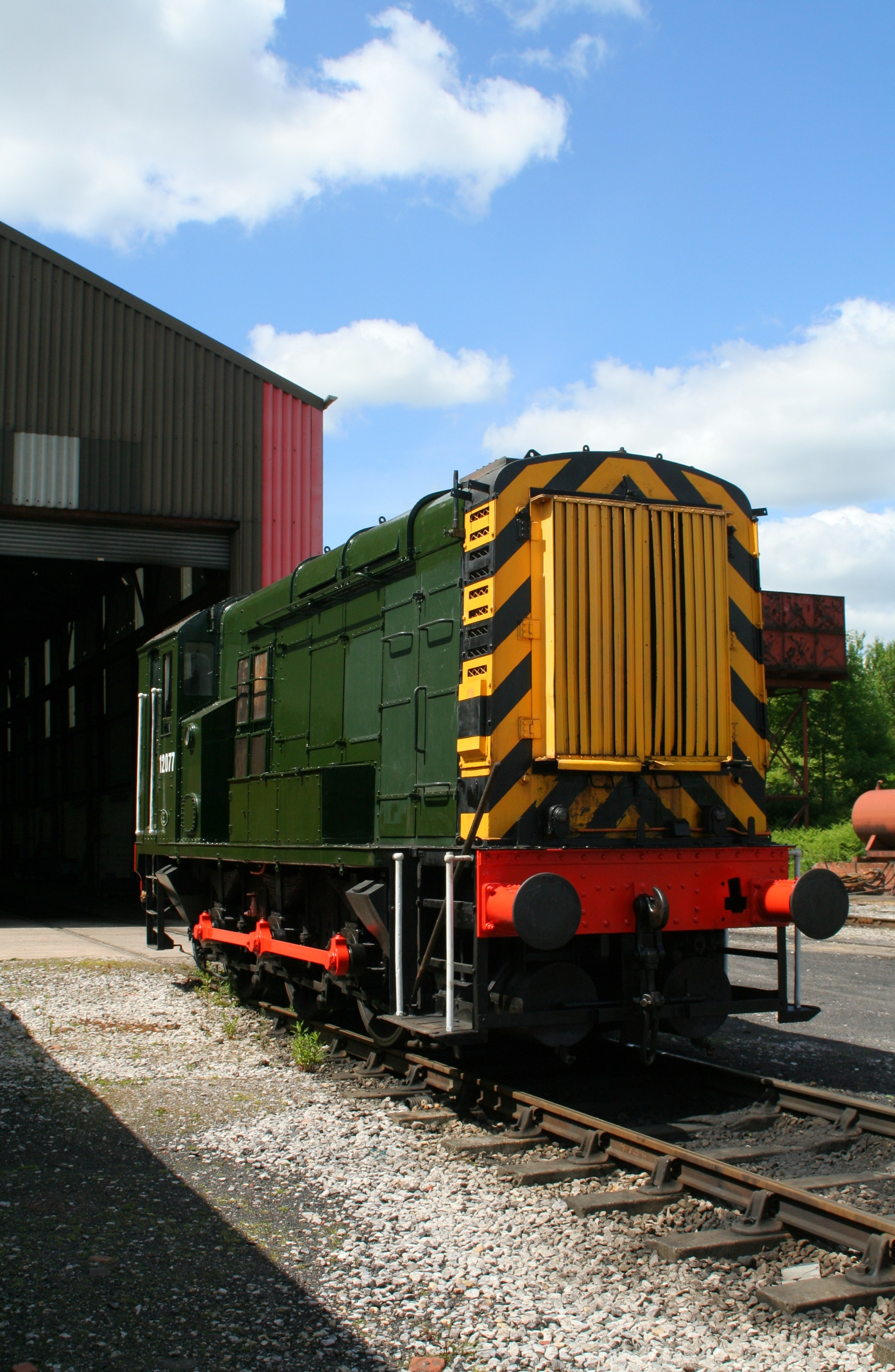
Class 11 shunter no. 12077 outside museum shed

- Derby St Mary's Gatehouse – situated at the entrance to the site, this small building was moved to Swanwick from the goods yard at Derby St Mary's. This contains Swanwick Junction Model Railway Club.
- Static Power Museum – normally open at busy periods and at special events, the building houses a good number of working machines.
- Demonstration Signal Box – recovered from Linby. Now in use at Brands Crossing as a demonstration signal box, with public access.
- Linby Colliery Sidings Signal Box – currently in use as a bookshop.
- Historic Carriage and Wagon Shed – a large number of coaches and wagons await restoration here, either in the sidings or the large shed in which the Society is based. On certain days, it is possible to see work being done inside the shed.
- National Fork Truck Heritage Centre and Road Transport Gallery – this recently-completed building houses a collection of heritage buses, lorries, fork lift trucks and other forms of road transport. On certain special events, some of the vehicles are put on display out in the open.
- Diesel depot – currently housing some of the centre's diesel fleet.

==== Butterley Park Miniature Railway ====
Operating on Sundays and Bank Holiday Mondays, miniature replicas of classic steam and diesel engines of both 3 1/2 in (89 mm) and 5 in (127 mm) gauge operate on a raised circuit of track. The public are permitted to ride for a small charge. The line consists of about 1/6 mile (0.27 km) of track, a traverser, tunnel, decorative speed signs and signal box.

Details of the stock that the miniature railway uses is shown below:

Butterley Park Miniature Railway Stock
0	Number and name	Description	Current status	Livery
1	5801	GWR 5800 Class "5" Replica	Operational	GWR Green
2	70038 "Robin Hood"	BR Standard Class 7 "5" Replica	Operational	BR Lined Green
3	"Lion"	"Lion" 0-4-2 Replica	Operational	Green

=== Riddings ===
There is no station platform located at Riddings, but there is a run-around loop on the northern branch of Codnor Park Junction, from which the line would have run northbound towards Pye Bridge. Just before the run around loop is a split in the track, which connects to the main line. The River Erewash runs underneath the junction.

== Special events ==
The railway runs events, ranging from Teddy Bear's Picnic specials to Gala events; they feature standard gauge collection and the GVLR's stock:

- Victorian train weekends, using railways pre-grouping and early LMS coaching stock
- Easter events
- Steam and diesel locomotive events
- Trains to the seaside at Swanwick Junction (late July-early September)
- Halloween Events
- Firework Night
- Santa Specials (late November until Christmas Eve).

The railway is licensed to host weddings and parties.

In September 1999, the Kosovo Train for Life was loaded at Butterley station, before travelling to Kosovo, via Kensington Olympia and the Channel Tunnel; this ran in conjunction with the Kosovo Force peace-keeping efforts.

From 2007 to 2019, the heritage centre hosted Indietracks, a music festival that was held at the Swanwick Junction site. The COVID-19 pandemic halted events in 2020 and 2021; in November 2021, it was announced that festival would no longer be held.

== Locomotives and rolling stock ==
The steam engines of the Midland Railway Trust that run passenger services are mostly ex-LMS and British Rail (BR) locomotives of similar designs. Rarer industrial and main line classes, such as one from as early as 1866, are stored in the Swanwick museum shed.

=== Steam locomotives ===
Number and name	Description	History	Current status	Livery	Owner(s)	Year built	Photograph
No. 1163 "Whitehead"	Peckett 0-4-0ST	Built in 1908, "Whitehead" was used in the major Welsh industries. On withdrawal, it was purchased by the Great Western Society and moved to the West Somerset Railway. Arrived at the Midland Railway – Butterley in July 1999.	Under repair	Unlined Brunswick Green with the BR crest.	Private owner	1908	
No. 3597 "Falmouth Docks No. 3"	Hawthorn Leslie 0-4-0ST		Under repair	Lined Green	Private owner	1926	
No. 47327(23)	LMS Fowler Class 3F 0-6-0T	On display in the museum awaiting overhaul.	Under repair	S&DJR Prussian Blue.	Derby City Council	1926	
No. 47357 (16440) "Uncle Albert"	LMS 0-6-0T Class 3F Jinty	Last operated in 2004. Being reassembled at Swanwick, after work on the chassis at the East Lancashire Railway and the boiler at the North Norfolk Railway. Made first post overhaul moves in October 2023 with re-entry to service planned to take place in December 2023. Planned to be outshopped in maroon livery as 16440.	Operational	LMS Maroon	Derby City Council	1926	
No. 47445	LMS Class 3F 0-6-0T Jinty	Under major restoration with work currently focused on the frames off site at the East Lancashire Railway.	Under repair	N/A	Derby City Council	1927	~
No. 46203 "Princess Margaret Rose"	LMS 4-6-2 Class 8P	Currently on display in the West Shed, Stored.	On static display	BR Maroon	Princess Royal Class Locomotive Trust	1935	
No. 6233 "Duchess of Sutherland"	LMS Coronation Class	Certified for main line running. Returned to service in September 2018 after an overhaul. Regularly used for rail tours.	Operational	LMS Crimson Lake	Princess Royal Class Locomotive Trust.	1938	
No. 3883 "Lord Phil"	Hunslet Austerity 0-6-0ST	Originally built for use with the War Department at Donnington. Based at Butterley since 2019. Boiler ticket expired in December 2021 and undergoing ten-yearly overhaul.	Under repair	Lined Green	Private owner	1943	
No.7214 "George"	RSH 0-4-0ST from British Celanese Works at Spondon	At PRCLT West Shed.	Under repair	Dark Green	Midland Railway Trust	1945	~
No. 2111 "Lytham St Annes"	Peckett 0-4-0ST	At PRCLT West Shed.	Under Repair	Lined Blue	Private owner	1949	
No. 80080	BR 2-6-4T Class 4MT	80080 worked on the old London, Tilbury and Southend Railway branches. Upon withdrawal, it was sent to Barry Island in the 1960s. 80080 was first sent to Peak Rail, along with 80098 also at Butterley, and they were moved to their current location in 1983. They were soon restored to work on main line railtours.	On loan to the Ecclesbourne Valley Railway	BR Lined Black with early crest.	Princess Royal Class Locomotive Trust.	1954	
No. 80098	BR 2-6-4T Class 4MT	Both 80080 and 80098 shared similar histories during their services with BR, both worked on the old London, Tilbury and Southend Railway branches; they were later allocated to other sheds and later sent to Barry in the 1960s. Its boiler ticket expired in late 2009 and it quickly moved into the workshop.	Under overhaul	BR Lined Black with late crest.	Princess Royal Class Locomotive Trust.	1954	
No. 7817 "Castle Donington Power Station No. 1"	RSH 0-4-0ST	One of the last steam locomotives in regular industrial use in Great Britain. Stored, awaiting overhaul.		Dark Blue.	Midland Railway Trust.	1954	
No. 73129	BR Standard Class 5	On display in the Exhibition Hall at Swanwick Junction, awaiting major overhaul.	Under repair	BR lined Black with the early crest.	Derby City Council	1956	

==== Static or dismantled ====
Number & Name	Description	History & Current Status	Livery	Owner	Date	Photograph
Brown Bailey No. 4	Nasmyth, Wilson and Company 0-4-0ST	Permanently plinthed outside gates at Swanwick Junction. Previously was the trust-created character "Oswald the Talking Engine"	Light Blue	Midland Railway Trust	1894	
No. 47564	LMS Class 3F Jinty 0-6-0T	Stored, dismantled.	BR Black	Derby City Council	1928	~

=== Diesel and electric locomotives ===
Number and name	Description	Current status	Livery	Owner	Photograph
"Andy" 16038	Fowler 0-4-0DM	Under restoration, possible conversion to diesel hydraulic.	Railfreight Grey (coal sector)	Private Owner	
"Albert/Emfour 9" D1114	Hudswell Clarke 0-6-0 Shunter	Undergoing restoration back to operational use.	Green	Midland Railway Trust	
No. 416 "Needlesnoot"	Andrew Barclay 0-4-0 Shunter	Operational after an engine overhaul; repaint into Castle Donington livery completed in 2020.	Castle Donington Blue	Midland Railway Trust	
No. RS12	Motorail Simplex No RS12	Stored – poor condition, but 90% complete	Brown	Midland Railway Trust	
No. RS9	Motorail Simplex No. RS9	Stored – very poor condition, 60% complete	Blue	Midland Railway Trust	
No. 441	Andrew Barclay 0-4-0 Shunter	Undergoing clutch repairs	Blue	Midland Railway Trust	
No. D1154 'Manton'	Hudswell Clarke 0-6-0 Shunter	Under restoration	Green		
No. 5337	Mercury Tractor 0-4-0	Stored.	Blue	Midland Railway Trust	
No. 384139/D2959	Ruston & Hornsby	Under Overhaul	BR Green	Midland Railway Trust	
No. D2858	BR 0-4-0 Class 02	Static display – gear box failure	BR Green	Midland Railway Trust	
No. D2138	BR 0-6-0 Class 03	Undergoing overhaul. Successful fundraising appeal resulted in the purchase of a new engine, which is being prepared for installation.	BR Green	Midland Railway Trust/NCB	
No. 08590 "Red Lion"	BR 0-6-0 Class 08	Operational - Butterley Yard Pilot	BR Blue	Private owner/Midland Railway Trust	
No. 08331	BR 0-6-0 Class 08	Operational	Black	Private owner/Midland Railway Trust	
No. 12077	BR 0-6-0 Class 11	Operational – Swanwick Yard pilot	BR Green	Midland Railway Trust	
No. 8001 (20001)	BR Bo-Bo Class 20	Operational - on loan to Epping Ongar Railway	BR Green, with full yellow ends	Class 20 Locomotive Society	
No. 20048	BR Bo-Bo Class 20	Operational - on loan to the Severn Valley Railway	BR Blue	Midland Class 20 Association	
No. 20059	BR Bo-Bo Class 20	Operational - on loan to the Watercress Line	BR Green, with yellow warning panels	Midland Diesel Group	
No. 20188	BR Bo-Bo Class 20	Operational, on loan to the Watercress Line	BR Green, with yellow warning panels	Midland Diesel Group	
No. 20205	BR Bo-Bo Class 20	Operational – main line certified	BR Blue	Class 20 Locomotive Society	
No. 20227	BR Bo-Bo Class 20	Operational - main line certified	London Transport Red	Class 20 Locomotive Society	
No. 25321	BR Bo-Bo Class 25	Awaiting electrical repairs and repaint	BR Green	Derby Industrial Museum	
No. 5580 (31162)	BR A1A-A1A Class 31	Operational	BR Blue	A1A Locomotives	
No. 31108	BR A1A-A1A Class 31	Operational	BR Railfreight red stripe	A1A Locomotives	
No. 31414	BR A1A-A1A Class 31	Undergoing restoration	N/A	A1A Locomotives	
No. 31418 "Boadicea"	BR A1A-A1A Class 31	Undergoing restoration (stored)	N/A	A1A Locomotives	
No. 31271 "Stratford 1840–2001"	BR A1A-A1A Class 31	Operational – on loan to Llangollen Railway	Railfreight Construction	A1A Locomotives	
No. 40012 "Aureol"	BR 1Co-Co1 Class 40	Currently having its turbocharger repaired	BR Blue	Class 40 Appeal	
No. D4 "Great Gable"	BR 1Co-Co1 Class 44	Operational.	BR Blue	Peak Locomotive Company	
No. 45041 "Royal Tank Regiment"	BR 1Co-Co1 Class 45	Operational, on loan to Nene Valley Railway	BR Blue	Peak Locomotive Company	
No. 45108	BR 1Co-Co1 Class 45	Operational, on loan to East Lancashire Railway	BR Blue	Peak Locomotive Company	
No. 45133	BR 1Co-Co1 Class 45	Under restoration	BR Blue	45/1 Preservation Group	
No. D182	BR 1Co-Co1 Class 46	Operational	BR Blue	Peak Locomotive Company	
No. 47401 "North Eastern"	BR Co-Co Class 47	Under restoration	BR Blue	47401 Project	
No. D1516 (47417)	BR Co-Co Class 47	Under restoration	BR Two-Tone Green	47401 Project	
No. 27000 Electra	BR Class 77 EM2 1500 V Electric	In operational condition, though generally an exhibit in the Matthew Kirtley Museum	Lined Black	EM2 Locomotive Society	

=== Multiple units ===
0	Number and name	Description	Current status	Livery	Photograph
1	Unit. 51118+56097	BR Class 100	Under restoration, owned by the Llangollen Railcar Group	BR Green	
2	DMBS 51907 + DTCL 56490	BR Class 108	Operational, private owner	BR Blue and Grey	
4	Unit. 977775+977776 (50015+56015)	BR Class 114	Stored, out of use	BR Blue	
5	Unit. 50019+56006	BR Class 114	Under restoration	BR Multiple Unit Green	
6	DMBS Unit. 51669+51849	BR Class 115	Restoration never to begin	Rusty Green	
7	Unit. 51591+59609+59659+51625	BR Class 127	Stored, out of use	BR Green, white crest.	
8	Unit 141113 (formed of 55513+55533)	BR Class 141	Operational, private owner	Red and White	
	Unit 142011 (formed of 55552+55602)	BR Class 142 Pacer	Operational, privately owned.	Provincial Blue	
10	Nos. 29666 and 29670	BR Class 505 (Trailers only)	Undergoing restoration, owned by the Altrincham Electric Railway Preservation Society	N/A	

=== Coaching stock ===
==== Midland Railway vintage set ====
These coaches are only in use on vintage days:

0	Number and name	Description	Current status	Livery	Owner
1	No. 6	LDECR TZ in-lined	Operational, stored in Matthew Kirtley Museum when not in use	Lined Red	Midland Railway Trust
2	No. 253	MR BTZ	Operational, stored in Matthew Kirtley Museum when not in use	Lined MR Red	Midland Railway Trust
3	No. 78	MR TY	Operational, stored in Matthew Kirtley Museum when not in use	Lined MR Red Livery	Midland Railway Trust
4	No. 50	LYR FO	On display in Matthew Kirtley Museum, awaiting full restoration	Plain Maroon	Derby City Council
5	No. 26481	MR CCTY	Operational, stored in Matthew Kirtley Museum when not in use	Grey	Midland Railway Trust
6	No. 1910	MR ROY	Not currently fit for passenger use, used by HC&W volunteers as saloon; stored in Matthew Kirtley Museum when not in use	Lined MR Red	Midland Railway Trust
7	No. 42608	LMS HBY	Operational, stored in Matthew Kirtley Museum when not in use	LMS Red	Derby City Council
8	No. 2944	MR BCK	On display in Matthew Kirtley Museum, awaiting full restoration	Plain Maroon	Midland Railway Trust
9	No. 1250	MR BT	Stored at Swanwick Junction Historic C&W sidings	Plain Maroon	Midland Railway Trust
10	No. 2885	MR CK	Stored in Historic Carriage and Wagon Workshop	In recovered state	Derby City Council/Midland Railway Trust
11	No. 34068	MR BZ	Under sheeting at Historic Carriage and Wagon Workshop	Brown	Midland Railway Trust
12	No. 1119	MR TZ	Awaiting restoration Historic Carriage and Wagon Workshop	Grey	Midland Railway Trust
13	No. 1260	MR PS	Operational, stored in Matthew Kirtley Museum when not in use	Lined MR Red	
14	No. 211	MR CF	Stored, awaiting restoration	Grey	Midland Railway Trust
15	No. 445	MR FS	Awaiting full restoration, on display in Matthew Kirtley Museum	Green	Midland Railway Trust
16	No. 349	MR PS	Stored, awaiting restoration	Maroon	Midland Railway Trust

==== LMS coaches ====
Restored coaches are run alongside MR coaches on certain running days:

Number and name	Description	Current status	Livery
No. M27093	LMS BTK	Stored in Matthew Kirtley Museum	Lined LMS Maroon
No. 45047	LMS INSP	Stored in Matthew Kirtley Museum, owned by 7F Preservation Group	LMS Maroon
No. 30225	LMS POS	On display in Matthew Kirtley Museum	Maroon
No. 5734 (DM395898)	LMS BTK	Being restored by its private owner.	LMS Maroon
No. 2884	LMS BGZ	Undergoing restoration in Historic Carriage and Wagon Workshop	Maroon
No. 10257	LMS SRFO	Currently on display in Matthew Kirtley Museum	Maroon
No. 14425	LMS SLT	Under sheeting at Historic Carriage and Wagon Workshop	Brown
No. 14281	LMS TK	Under sheeting at Historic Carriage and Wagon Workshop	Brown
No. 14718	LMS TO	Under sheeting at Historic Carriage and Wagon Workshop	Brown
No. 5682	LMS TO	Gifted to new owner for restoration	Lined LMS Maroon
No. 16553	LMS TO	Under restoration Historic Carriage and Wagon Workshop	Red
No. 16782	LMS TK	Under sheeting at Historic Carriage and Wagon Workshop	Maroon
No. 612	LMS SLT	Destroyed by arsonists. Scrapped, but many parts recovered.	Lined LMS Maroon
No. 31299	LMS BG	Was previously used as disco coach, now stored; privately owned, in front of Historic Carriage and Wagon Workshop	LMS Maroon

==== Mark 1 and Mark 2 coaches ====
Mark 1s are the staple passenger stock of the heritage centre:

Number and name	Description	Current status	Livery
No. E9300	BR Mk1 BSO	Operational	Blood and Custard
No. W4904	BR Mk1 TSO	Operational	Blood and Custard
No. M1862	BR Mk1 RMB	Operational	Blood and Custard
No. 99040 (21232)	BR Mk1 BCK	Operational – Currently in use with 6201 Princess Elizabeth	LMS Crimson
No. NE4537	BR Mk1 TSO	Operational	Lined Maroon
No. M13328	BR Mk1 FK	Operational	Blood and Custard
No. M1802	BR Mk1 RMB in Maroon Livery	Under overhaul	Lined maroon
No. 84020 (81020)	BR Mk1 BG	In use as temporary store	Lined Maroon
No. 4816	BR Mk1 SO	Stored, out of use	Lined Maroon
No. M4804	BR Mk1 SO	Stored, out of use	Lined Maroon
No. 4480	BR Mk1 SO	Stored, out of use	Lined Maroon
No. 84144 (81144)	BR Mk1 BG	Operational	Lined Maroon
No. 99041 (35476)	BR Mk1 BSK	Operational, based at PRCLT West Shed; 6233's Support Coach	Lined Maroon
No. 80782	BR Mk1 BG	Stores vehicle	Plain Maroon
No 9281	BR Mk1 BSO	Stored	Lined Maroon
No. 80590	BR Mk1 BG	Tugs Trust Coach, based in Butterley Yard	Lined Maroon
No. 86696	BR Mk1 GUV	Owned and used as stores vehicle by Electra Preservation Group	Plain Maroon
No. 93881	BR Mk1 GUV	Used as stores vehicle by Historic Carriage and Wagon Department	BR Blue
No. 93380	BR Mk1 GUV	Used as stores vehicle by MRT Railcar Group	BR Blue
No. 93180	BR Mk1 GUV	Stores vehicle	Maroon
No. 34255 (DB975534)	BR Mk1 BCK	Stored at Butterley Goods Dock	Plain Green
No. 6390 (80723)	BR Mk1 BG	In use as Class 20 Locomotive Society general storage container	InterCity Executive
No. 5045	BR Mk1 TSO	Ex-Swanwick waiting room and picnic coach. Undergoing overhaul	Plain Maroon
No. 2902	BR Mk1 Royal Dining/Kitchen Saloon	On display in Matthew Kirtley Museum	Claret
No. 13484 (ADB977528)	BR Mk2b FK	Class 20 Locomotive Society mess coach, at Swanwick Junction	Research colours
No. 5461	BR Mk2b TSO	A1A Group Mess Coach, at Swanwick Junction; scrapped 2021	Blue and grey

==== Other coaches ====
Butterley owns several unique carriages, which are only used on very special occasions:

Number and name	Description	Current status	Livery
No. 6320 (18562)	LMS BFK	Based at PRCLT West Shed, used as an inspection saloon; currently undergoing a repaint	Lined LMS Maroon
No. 45000	LNWR SPEC	Arrived November 2005, on display at PRCLT West Shed	Lined LMS Maroon
No. 45050	LYR SPEC	Purchased by PRCLT September 2005, Operational	Lined Maroon
No. 1176	SR PMV	Currently stored in Tamper sidings, used as S&T stores van	Brown
No. 1865	SR PMV	Currently stored in Tamper sidings, underframe for MR 211	Blue
No. 2151	SR PMV	Currently stored on end of Ashpit road	Maroon

== Matthew Kirtley Museum ==
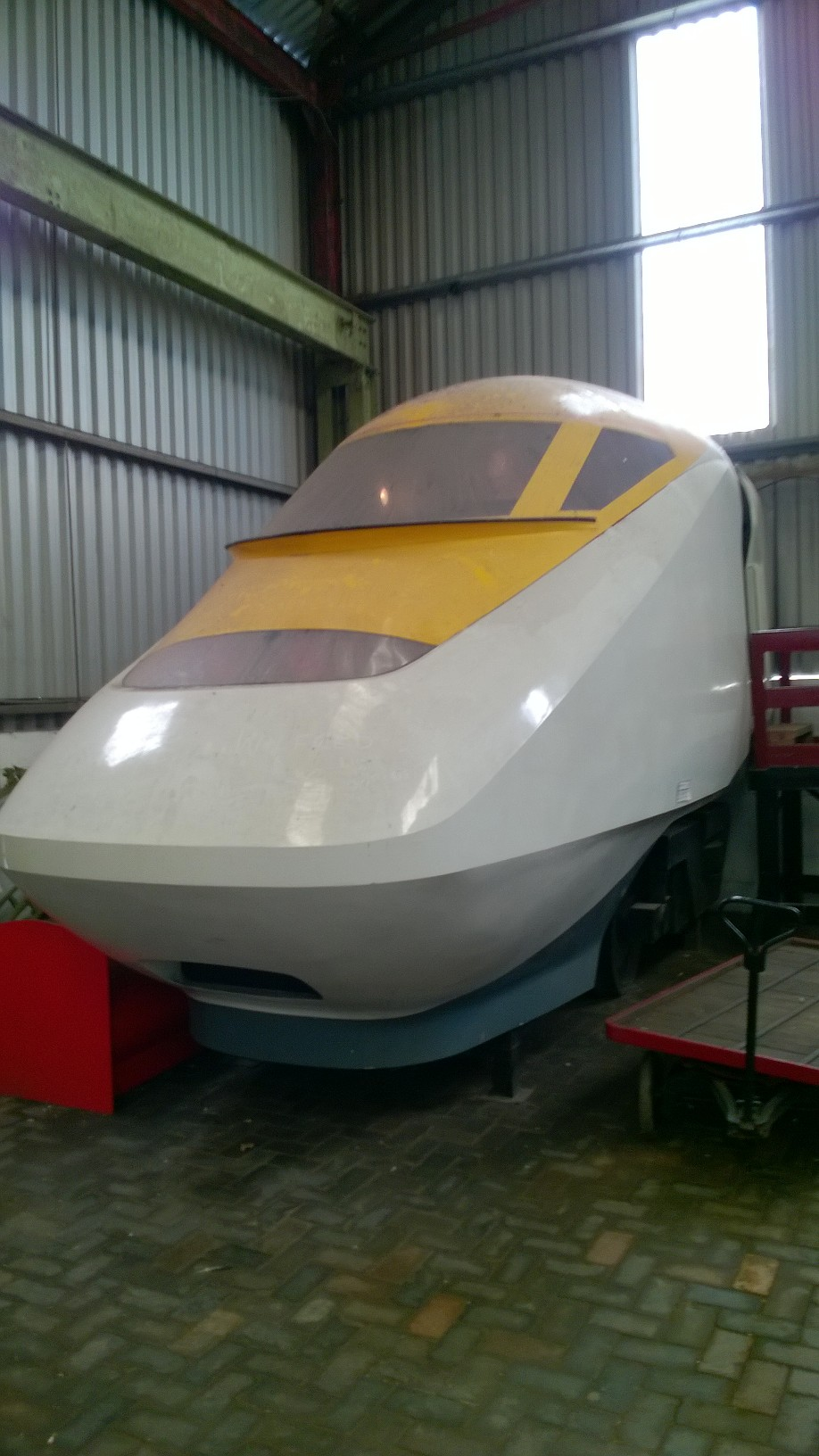
Mock up of the Class 93 locomotive

The Matthew Kirtley shed is the largest building on the Swanwick Junction site and holds all the exhibits of the museum. As of March 2022, it is currently closed to the public, awaiting repair of the shed roof.

Below is a list of stock that can be found inside:

Museum Stock
No. 158A	Midland Railway 156 Class 2-4-0	This engine has not run under her own steam since arrival at the trust and is part of the National Collection. Currently on loan at Barrow Hill Roundhouse.	Midland Railway Maroon	National Railway Museum	1866	
"Gladys"	Markham & Co. 0-4-0ST	A static display	Dark Green	Midland Railway Trust	1894	
"Victory"	Peckett 0-4-0ST	A static display	Dark Green	Midland Railway Trust	1919	
"Stanton 24"	Andrew Barclay 0-4-0TC	A static display	Dark Green	Midland Railway Trust	1925	
Boots No. 2	0-4-0TF	A static display	Boots Blue (with logo)	Midland Railway Trust	1955	~

== Golden Valley Light Railway ==
The Golden Valley Light Railway is a 2 ft (610 mm) narrow gauge line. Laid on the trackbed of a former ironworks railway, this line runs for just under one mile (1.6 km) from the Swanwick Junction site to the far end of the country park adjacent to the former site of Newlands Inn. The terminus is just above the eastern portal of the Butterley Tunnel, which forms part of the Cromford Canal. The Swanwick Terminus gained a new engine shed in 2007, which specifically houses GVLR stock.

=== Railway stock ===
In addition to the standard gauge stock on the Midland Railway, the Golden Valley Light Railway, a separate organisation altogether, owns a collection of locomotives, ex-colliery manriders, Ashover coach no.4 and ex industrial wagons, many of which are being restored to work on the line.

Number and name	Description	Current status	Train brakes	Livery	Owner
TDA CIVIL No.1 "JOAN"	0-4-2IST	Stored, awaiting overhaul	Single Pipe Air	SDJR Blue	Private owner
O&K 7529	0-4-0WT	Operational, restoration completed in 2021	Single Pipe Air	Red underframes and wheels, Black boiler, Green cab	Private owner
60SD364 "Campbells"	4wDM Simplex	Operational	Single Pipe Air	CBW yellow	GVLR
101T020 "Ellison"	4wDM Simplex "T" Class	Operational	Single Pipe Air	Blue	Private owner
"Hunslet Husky" HE7178/71		Stored, pending restoration	None fitted	N/A	GVLR
222068 "Berry Hill"	4wDM 20HP	Operational	None fitted	Brunswick Green	GVLR
3753 "Darcy"	Baguley Drewry 70HP	Operational	Single Pipe Air	Purple/pink	Private owner
10249	Deutz 11.8HP	Operational	None fitted	Blue	Private owner
3742/31	Lister/Blackstone petrol engine	Under restoration	None fitted	N/A	Private owner
53726	Lister/Blackstone 15HP	Operational	None fitted	Lister Green	Private owner
40SD 529	4wDM "Simplex" 40HP	Operational	Single Pipe Air	Simplex yellow	Private owner
8739 "Pioneer"	4wDM "Simplex" 40HP	Operational	None fitted	Green	GVLR
11177 "Holwell Castle"	4wDM Motor Rail 60HP	Under restoration – Dorman engine to be replaced	Twin Pipe Air, will be converted for GVLR use	Blue	GVLR
11246/63	4wDM Motor Rail	Stored	None fitted	N/A	GVLR
RH191646/38 "Lyddia"	4wDM Ruston	Out of traffic, with major oil leak	None fitted	Dark Green	GVLR
MR8667/41 "Tubby"	4wDM 28HP Simplex	Operational	Single Pipe Air	Dark Green, with yellow warning stripes	GVLR
3703 "NG24"	Baguley Drewry battery loco	Operational	None fitted	MOD Green, with wasp stripes	GVLR
WR5 "Baby Jane"	4wBE BEV	Requires significant components	None fitted	Yellow	Private owner
