= Butterley railway station =

Heritage station in Derbyshire, England

Butterley
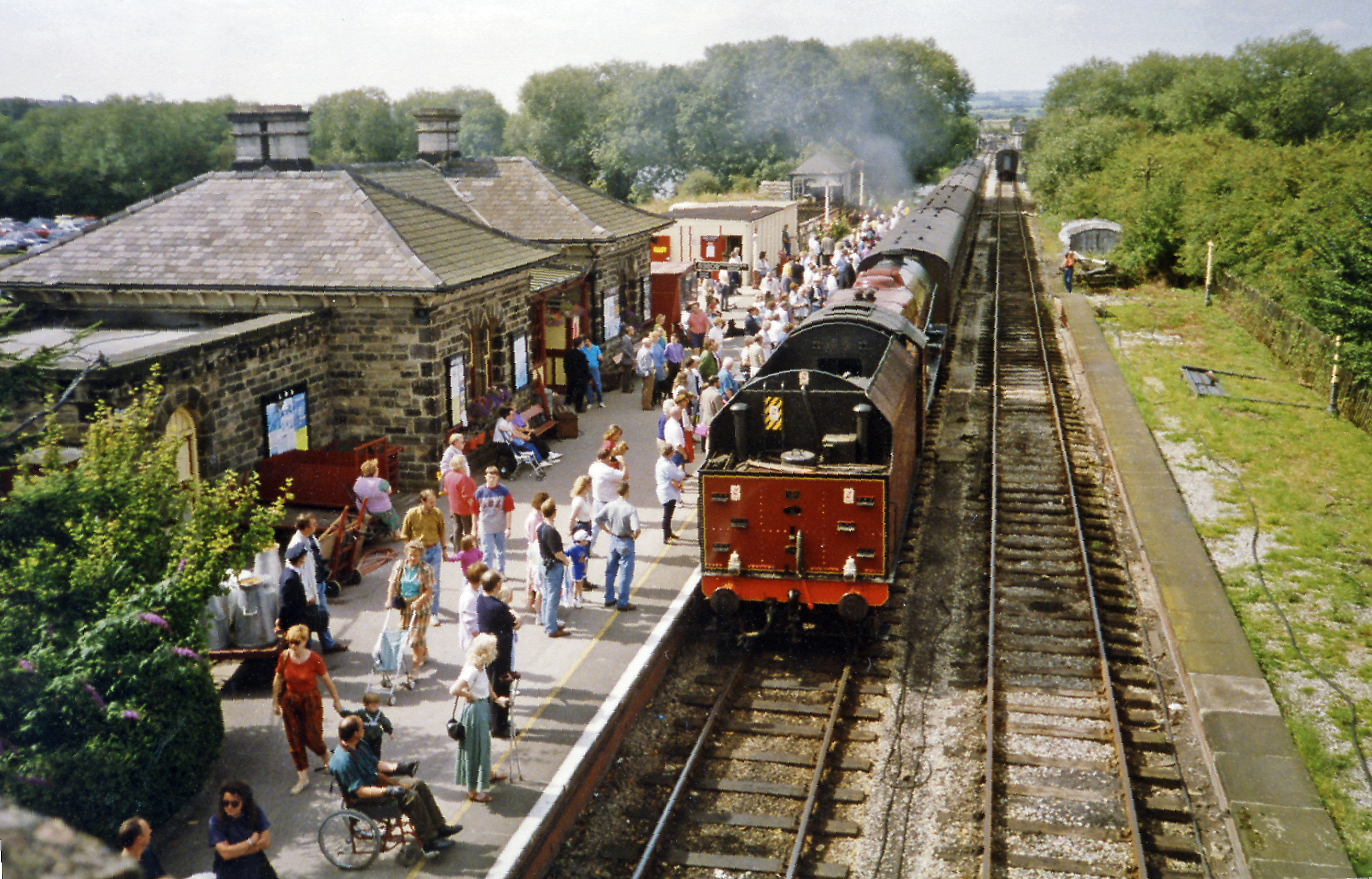
- The restored station in 1993 with 'Princess Margaret Rose'

General information
- Location: Butterley, Amber Valley; England
- Coordinates: 53°3′48″N 1°24′4″W
- Grid reference: SK402519
- System: Station on heritage railway
- Operator: Midland Railway - Butterley
- Platforms: 2

History
- Original company: Midland Railway
- Post-grouping: London, Midland and Scottish Railway; London Midland Region of British Railways

Key dates
- 1 May 1875: Opened as Butterley
- 29 July 1935: Renamed Butterley for Ripley and Swanwick
- 16 June 1947: Closed to passengers
- 7 November 1964: Goods facilities withdrawn
- 22 August 1981: Reopened
Location

Butterley railway station is a preserved railway station on the Heritage Midland Railway - Butterley in Derbyshire.

== History ==
Originally located on the Midland Railway's Ambergate to Pye Bridge Line, the station opened on 1 May 1875 as Butterley, being renamed Butterley for Ripley and Swanwick on 29 July 1935. It closed to passengers on 16 June 1947, but remained open for goods traffic until 7 November 1964. The line itself closed in 1968. British Railways demolished the original station buildings and signal box.

=== Stationmasters ===
- James Blackwell 1875 - 1884
- W. Allen 1884 - 1885
- J. Randall 1885 - 1886
- John H. Grundy 1886 - 1906 (afterwards station master at Alfreton)
- William Tunn 1906 - 1908 (afterwards station master at Pinxton)
- Amos Follows 1908 - 1910 (afterwards station master at Kirkby-in-Ashfield)
- Samuel Joseph Whitehead 1910 - 1922 (afterwards station master at Bulwell)
- Edward Skerrett ca. 1924
- Fred Fletcher 1927 - 1936 (afterwards station master at Cannock Chase)
- Mr. Billington ca. 1940
- H. Anslow ca. 1955 ca. 1956

== Midland Railway Trust ==
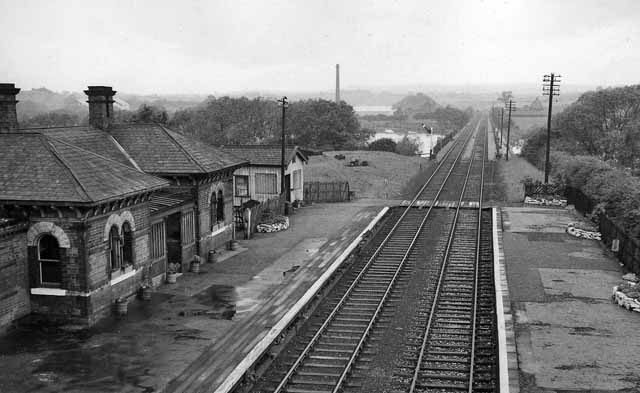
The station in 1963

The station was reopened by the Midland Railway Trust on 22 August 1981 Volunteers have restored the station site, rebuilding the station buildings from Whitwell railway station (in addition, there are some Portakabins). The signal box comes from Ais Gill, on the famous Settle-Carlisle Line and is a standard Midland type 2B box. The station originally had two platforms but the present only the southernmost platform (i.e. the original westbound line) is in use to the public.

Swanwick Junction railway station is a short walk or train ride away to the east. Hammersmith railway station is a shorter distance to the west over Butterley Reservoir by train.

There is parking available at this station.

== See also ==
- Listed buildings in Ripley, Derbyshire

== Sources ==
- Butt, R. V. J. (October 1995). The Directory of Railway Stations: details every public and private passenger station, halt, platform and stopping place, past and present (1st ed.). Sparkford: Patrick Stephens Ltd. ISBN 978-1-85260-508-7. OCLC 60251199. OL 11956311M.
- Clinker, C.R. (October 1978). Clinker's Register of Closed Passenger Stations and Goods Depots in England, Scotland and Wales 1830-1977. Bristol: Avon-AngliA Publications & Services. ISBN 0-905466-19-5.
- Croughton, Godfrey; Kidner, R. W.; Young, Alan (1982). Private and Untimetabled Railway Stations: Halts and Stopping Places. Trowbridge, Wilts.: The Oakwood Press. ISBN 0-85361-281-1.

Preceding station	Heritage railways	Following station
Hammersmith Terminus	Midland Railway – Butterley	Swanwick Junction Terminus
Historical railways
Ambergate	Midland Railway; Ambergate to Pye Bridge Line	Pye Bridge
Ripley; Line closed, station closed	Midland Railway; Ripley Branch	Terminus
