= Butterleigh =

Village in Devon, England

Coordinates: 50.863450°N 3.459320°W

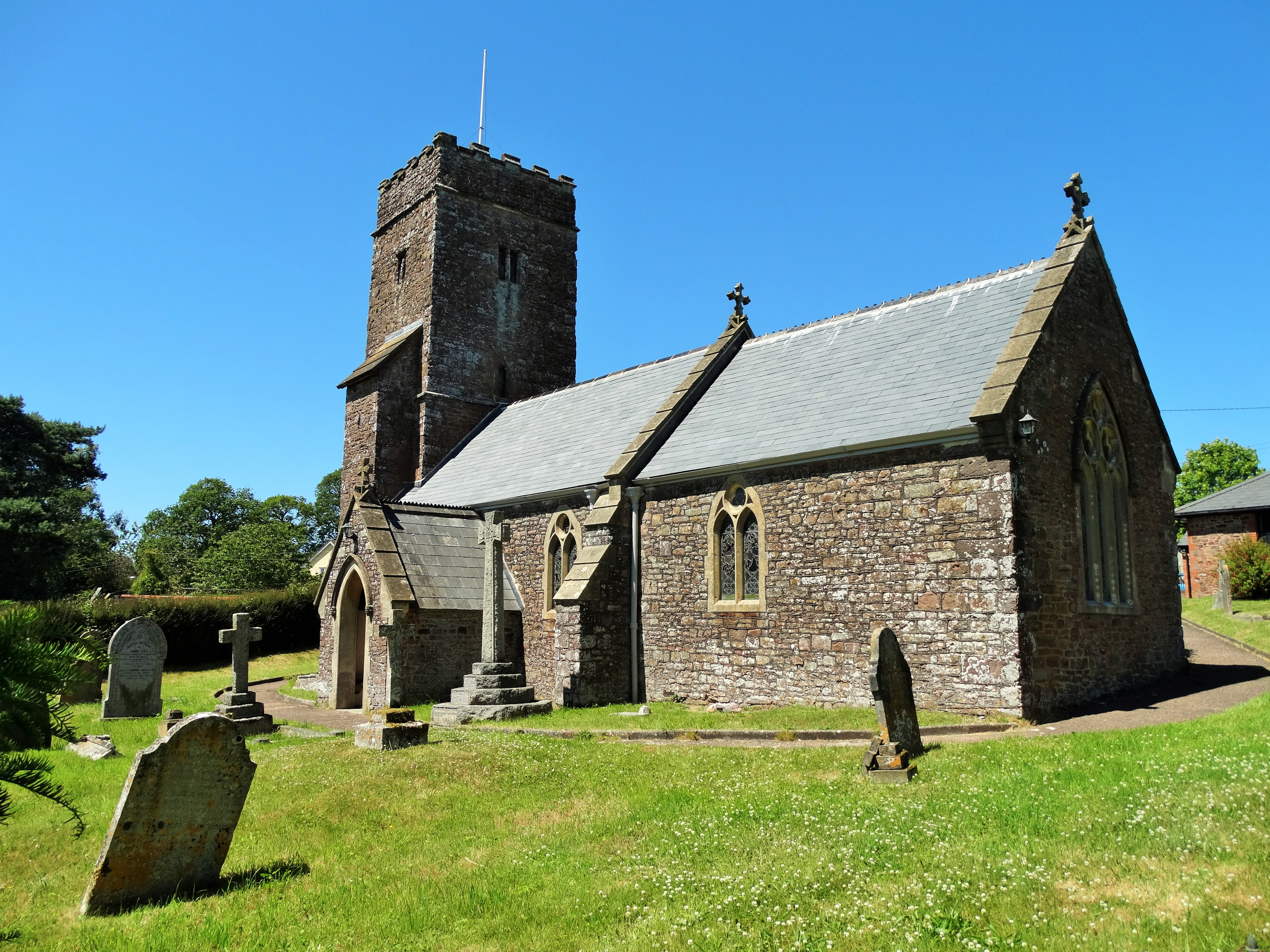
- St Matthew's Church in Butterleigh

- Location within Devon
- Population: 110 (2021 UK Census)
- District: Mid Devon
- Shire county: Devon
- Region: South West
- Country: England
- Sovereign state: United Kingdom
- Police: Devon and Cornwall
- Fire: Devon and Somerset
- Ambulance: South Western
- UK Parliament: Honiton and Sidmouth

Butterleigh is a village and civil parish in Mid Devon, England situated about three miles south east of Tiverton. The village includes a public house, village hall and an award-winning blacksmith. It is famous for its harvest home.

== St Matthew's Church ==
The parish church of St Matthew has a 13th-century baptismal font, and an alms box predating King Charles I.

=== Monuments ===
In the church of St Matthew is a mural monument to Elizabeth Courtenay (d.1624), a daughter of Philip III Courtenay (1547-1611) of Molland by his wife Joane Boyes (d.1586), daughter of John Boyes of Kent. Elizabeth married in 1600 to the Hollander Peter Muden, a doctor of medicine, of Butterleigh. Shortly before 1600 Muden had enlarged the parish church and later erected the existing mural monument to his wife which contains a female effigy between two children with verse.
