= Pye Bridge railway station =

Disused railway station in Pye Bridge, Alfreton

Pye Bridge

General information
- Location: Pye Bridge, Alfreton; England
- Coordinates: 53.0697°N 1.3418°W
- Grid reference: SK442527
- Platforms: 4

Other information
- Status: Disused

History
- Original company: Midland Railway
- Post-grouping: London, Midland and Scottish Railway

Key dates
- 1 December 1851: Opened as Pye Bridge for Alfreton
- May 1862: Renamed Pye Bridge
- 2 January 1967: Closed
Location

Pye Bridge railway station served the village of Pye Bridge, Derbyshire, England from 1851 to 1967 on the Erewash Valley Line.

== History ==
The station opened as Pye Bridge for Alfreton on 1 December 1851 by the Midland Railway. It was renamed Pye Bridge in May 1862. Local passenger services on the Ambergate-Pye Bridge line were stopped on 16 June 1947 and the station closed to both passengers from the Erewash Valley Line and goods traffic on 2 January 1967.

== Stationmasters ==
- James Slater Ball ca. 1853
- John Waterson until 1862
- D. Beattie 1862 - 1863
- W.J. Jacques from 1863
- Herbert T. Brown until 1870
- H.P. Jeffries until 1873
- James Beebe 1873 - 1905 (formerly station master at Hathern)
- William Frederick Best 1905 - 1921 (formerly station master at Codnor Park)
- Frank G. Sugars 1921 - 1927 (formerly station master at Shefford, afterwards station master at Newark)
- C.V. Bunker 1927 - 1936 (afterwards station master at Rushden)
- John Hitchens from 1937 (formerly station master at Codnor Park)
- W.A. Bamford ca. 1955

Preceding station	Historical railways	Following station
Alfreton	Midland Railway; Erewash Valley Line	Codnor Park and Ironville; Line open, station closed
Codnor Park and Ironville	Midland Railway; Mansfield & Pinxton Railway	Pinxton and Selston
Disused railways
Terminus	Midland Railway Ambergate-Pye Bridge line	Butterley Line closed, station open
