= Grade II* listed buildings in Amber Valley =

There are over 20,000 Grade II* listed buildings in England. This page is a list of these buildings in the district of Amber Valley in Derbyshire.

== List of buildings ==
Name	Location	Type	Completed (Note: The date given is the date used by Historic England as significant for the initial building or that of an important part in the structure's description.)	Date designated	Grid ref. (Note: Sometimes known as OSGB36, the grid reference is based on the British national grid reference system used by the Ordnance Survey.) Geo-coordinates	Entry number (Note: The "List Entry Number" is a unique number assigned to each listed building and scheduled monument by Historic England.)	Image
Church of St Martin	Alfreton	Church	19th century	13 July 1966	SK4073155885; 53°05′55″N 1°23′35″W	1335406	Church of St Martin More images
Belper river weirs, retaining walls and sluices to Belper river veirs	Bridge Foot, Belper	Weir	1796–97	3 February 1966	SK3454048170; 53°01′47″N 1°29′11″W	1335702	Belper river weirs, retaining walls and sluices to Belper river veirs More images
Road archway and footbridge (includes offices forming south part of block in east side of archway)	Bridge Foot, Belper	Footbridge	Late 18th–early 19th century	3 February 1966	SK3453748036; 53°01′43″N 1°29′11″W	1087395	Road archway and footbridge (includes offices forming south part of block in east side of archway) More images
Mills occupied by George Brettle and Company Limited (that part along the Chapel Street frontage, bounded on the north by the 1834 building, including northern rear wing, and, on the south, by the recessed, single-storey red-brick building)	Belper	Mill	Early–mid-19th century	3 February 1966	SK3465947298; 53°01′19″N 1°29′05″W	1087409	Mills occupied by George Brettle and Company Limited (that part along the Chapel Street frontage, bounded on the north by the 1834 building, including northern rear wing, and, on the south, by the recessed, single-storey red-brick building) More images
Crossroads Farmhouse	Belper	Farmhouse	Early 19th century	3 February 1966	SK3364247869; 53°01′37″N 1°29′59″W	1087421	Crossroads Farmhouse More images
North wing of Dalley Farmhouse	Belper	Farmhouse	17th century	30 December 1979	SK3368248096; 53°01′45″N 1°29′57″W	1087426	North wing of Dalley Farmhouse
East and south boundary walls to eastern farmyard at Dalley Farm, north and west boundary walls and stone steps to farm complex	Belper	Boundary wall	Early 19th century	13 December 1979	SK3365148186; 53°01′48″N 1°29′59″W	1087427	Upload Photo
Stable range and carriageway entrance dividing east and west farmyards at Dalley Farm	Belper	Stable	Early 19th century	13 December 1979	SK3369248082; 53°01′44″N 1°29′57″W	1087428	Upload Photo
Range of farm buildings fronting north side of east and west farmyards at Dalley Farm	Belper	Farm buildings	Early 19th century	13 December 1979	SK3371048103; 53°01′45″N 1°29′56″W	1087429	Upload Photo
Range of farm buildings forming western side of west farmyard at Dalley Farm	Belper	Farm buildings	Early 19th century	13 December 1979	SK3367548080; 53°01′44″N 1°29′58″W	1087430	Upload Photo
Northeastern range of farm buildings at Dalley Farm (L-shaped range including northern hay barn, corner cart shed and shelter shed at lower level	Belper	Farm buildings	19th century	13 December 1979	SK3372348126; 53°01′46″N 1°29′55″W	1087431	Upload Photo
Moscow Farmhouse	Milford, Belper	Farmhouse	1812–15	13 December 1979	SK3467044478; 52°59′47″N 1°29′06″W	1335721	Upload Photo
Ranges to east of house at Moscow Farm	Milford, Belper	Farmhouse	unknown	13 December 1979	SK3467844468; 52°59′47″N 1°29′05″W	1099936	Upload Photo
Ranges to north, east and west of foldyard at Moscow Farm	Milford, Belper	Farm buildings	unknown	13 December 1979	SK3465444465; 52°59′47″N 1°29′06″W	1087352	Upload Photo
Unitarian Chapel and Chapel Cottage	Belper	Chapel	1689	13 December 1979	SK3496247838; 53°01′36″N 1°28′49″W	1348701	Unitarian Chapel and Chapel Cottage More images
Church Farmhouse and attached outbuilding	Denby	Farmhouse	Early 17th century	13 February 1967	SK3981646461; 53°00′50″N 1°24′29″W	1109127	Church Farmhouse and attached outbuilding
Park Hall Farmhouse	Denby	Farmhouse	Early 17th century	25 September 1951	SK3815547366; 53°01′20″N 1°25′57″W	1109132	Upload Photo
Church of St John the Baptist	Dethick	Church	1530	13 February 1967	SK3271457970; 53°07′04″N 1°30′46″W	1373840	Church of St John the Baptist More images
Lea Hall, gatepier, and boundary wall to the north	Dethick	House	18th century	13 February 1967	SK3333357482; 53°06′49″N 1°30′12″W	1109185	Lea Hall, gatepier, and boundary wall to the north More images
Lea Wood Hall, entrance gatepiers and attached boundary wall	Dethick	Country House	1874–77	26 November 1979	SK3228156221; 53°06′08″N 1°31′10″W	1109189	Upload Photo
Manor Farmhouse	Dethick	Farmhouse	18th century	25 September 1951	SK3276857980; 53°07′05″N 1°30′43″W	1335316	Manor Farmhouse More images
Duffield Hall	Duffield	Country house	c.1640	13 February 1967	SK3452943014; 52°59′00″N 1°29′14″W	1158301	Duffield Hall More images
Stone Row	Golden Valley, Ironville	Cottages	Late 18th century	7 December 1976	SK4265251296; 53°03′26″N 1°21′54″W	1109007	Stone Row More images
Church of St Lawrence	Heanor	Church	15th century	25 November 1963	SK4358146440; 53°00′49″N 1°21′07″W	1311460	Church of St Lawrence More images
Holbrook Hall	Holbrook	House	17th century	13 February 1967	SK3631144597; 52°59′51″N 1°27′38″W	1335333	Upload Photo
Christ Church	Holloway	Church	1911	14 August 1985	SK3230056965; 53°06′32″N 1°31′08″W	1335315	Christ Church More images
South Sitch	Idridgehay and Alton	House	1621	13 February 1967	SK2881048709; 53°02′06″N 1°34′19″W	1109057	Upload Photo
The Old Rectory and attached stable block	Kedleston	House	1986	24 January 1986	SK3047241061; 52°57′58″N 1°32′52″W	1335354	Upload Photo
Lion Statue	Kedleston Park	Statue	c.1760–70 by Joseph Wilton	13 February 1967	SK3117040236; 52°57′31″N 1°32′15″W	1109087	Lion Statue More images
Gothic Temple	Kedleston Park	House	c.1758–59	13 February 1967	SK3187741789; 52°58′21″N 1°31′36″W	1276750	Gothic Temple More images
Monument to Michael Drayton	Kedleston Park	Vase	c.1760–70	13 February 1967	SK3115540231; 52°57′31″N 1°32′16″W	1109086	Monument to Michael Drayton
The Orangery	Kedleston Park	Orangery	1800–01	13 February 1967	SK3102840255; 52°57′32″N 1°32′22″W	1109084	The Orangery
The South Lodges	Kedleston Park	Lodges	c.1775	13 February 1967	SK3054141181; 52°58′02″N 1°32′48″W	1311480	The South Lodges More images
The Stables	Kedleston Park	Stable	1768–69	13 February 1967	SK3114240322; 52°57′34″N 1°32′16″W	1109125	The Stables
The Sulphur Bath	Kedleston Park	Bath house	1759–62	13 February 1967	SK3181140531; 52°57′40″N 1°31′40″W	1335353	The Sulphur Bath
The Summer House	Kedleston Park	Summerhouse	c.1775	13 February 1967	SK3113540197; 52°57′30″N 1°32′17″W	1109085	The Summer House More images
Top Farmhouse	Kilburn	Farmhouse	16th century	22 August 1980	SK3788945852; 53°00′31″N 1°26′12″W	1335337	Top Farmhouse More images
Kedleston Hotel	Quarndon	Hotel	1760–62	13 February 1967	SK3262040580; 52°57′42″N 1°30′57″W	1109064	Kedleston Hotel More images
Derwent Viaduct	Ripley	Viaduct	1836-40	11 February 2014	SK3476751185; 53°03′24″N 1°28′58″W	1417625	Derwent Viaduct More images
Church of St Luke	Heage	Church	1646–61	29 November 1965	SK3696550627; 53°03′06″N 1°27′00″W	1158964	Church of St Luke More images
Heage Windmill	Heage	Windmill	Early 19th century	29 November 1965	SK3669150783; 53°03′11″N 1°27′15″W	1109016	Heage Windmill More images
Furnaces at Morley Park Iron Works	Ripley	Furnace	c.1780	29 November 1965	SK3799849190; 53°02′19″N 1°26′05″W	1108984	Furnaces at Morley Park Iron Works More images
Padley Hall	Ripley	House	Mid-17th century	29 November 1965	SK3946051434; 53°03′31″N 1°24′46″W	1159063	Padley Hall More images
Home Farmhouse and associated farm buildings	Shipley	Farmhouse	1861	14 October 1974	SK4362944261; 52°59′38″N 1°21′05″W	1335340	Home Farmhouse and associated farm buildings More images
Morley Manor	Smalley	House	1900	20 January 1986	SK4005642631; 52°58′46″N 1°24′18″W	1109106	Upload Photo
Church of All Saints	South Wingfield	Church	12th century	13 February 1967	SK3832655778; 53°05′52″N 1°25′45″W	1040011	Church of All Saints More images
Crich Stand	Crich	War memorial	1923	15 October 1997	SK3439455369; 53°05′40″N 1°29′16″W	1072594	Crich Stand More images

== See also ==
- Grade I listed buildings in Derbyshire
- Grade II* listed buildings in Bolsover (district)
- Grade II* listed buildings in Chesterfield
- Grade II* listed buildings in Derby
- Grade II* listed buildings in Derbyshire Dales
- Grade II* listed buildings in Erewash
- Grade II* listed buildings in High Peak
- Grade II* listed buildings in North East Derbyshire
- Grade II* listed buildings in South Derbyshire
