= Wingfield railway station =

Former railway station in Derbyshire, England

Wingfield
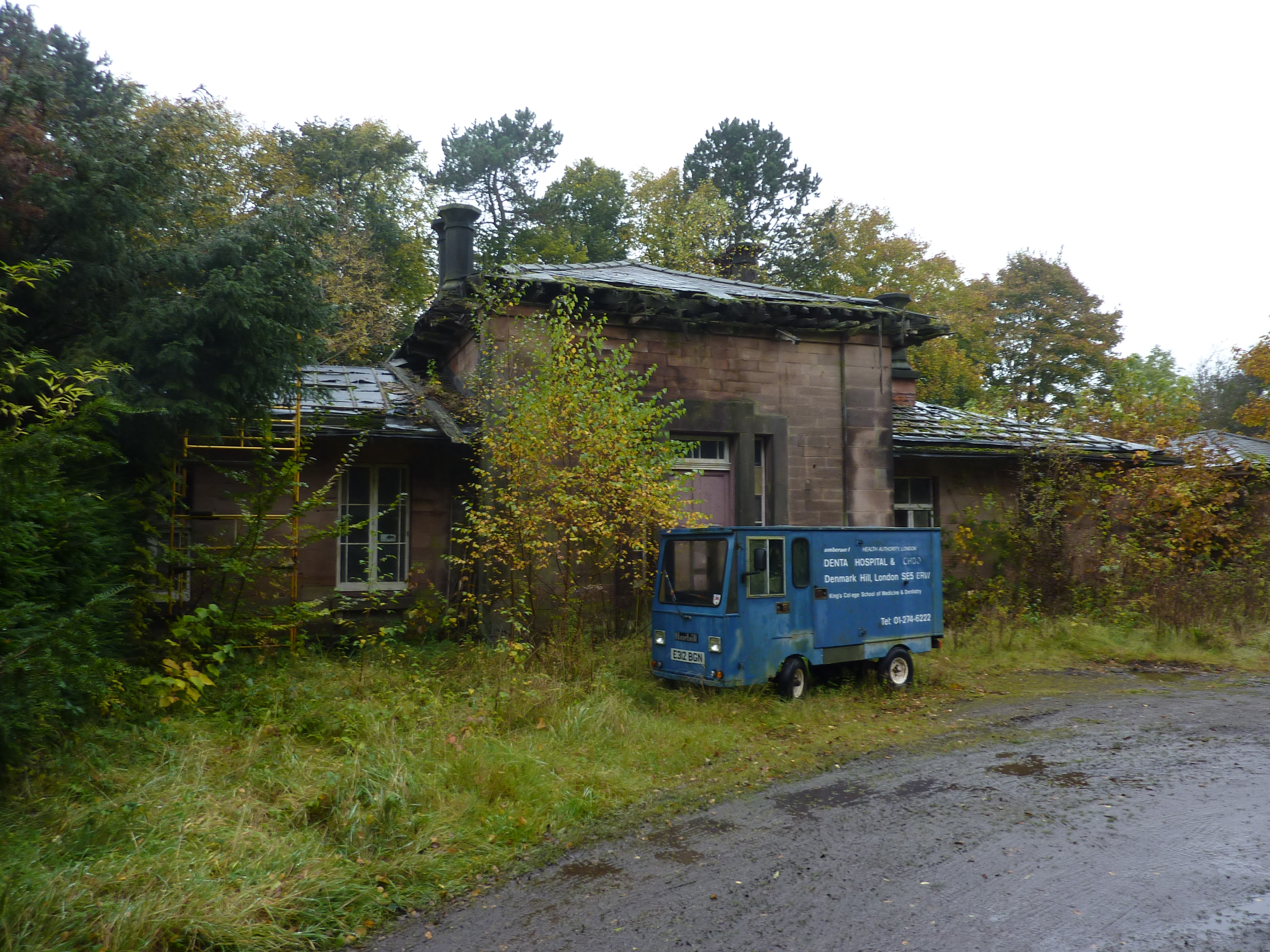
- Wingfield railway station building in 2012

General information
- Location: South Wingfield, Borough of Amber Valley; England
- Coordinates: 53.0975°N 1.4264°W
- Ordnance Survey: SK3851055754
- Platforms: 2

Other information
- Status: Disused (as a station)
- Classification: Grade II* listed

History
- Original company: North Midland Railway
- Pre-grouping: Midland Railway
- Post-grouping: LMS; British Railways

Key dates
- 11 May 1840: Station opened
- 1 December 1848: renamed Wingfield (Alfreton) then Wingfield for Alfreton
- 11 May 1862: renamed Wingfield
- 2 January 1967: Station closed
Location

Wingfield railway station served a rural area of Derbyshire, England between 1840 and 1967. Starting in 2019 the building was restored to how it looked in 1840, and now operates as a tea room, shop, and heritage centre, with views of the Midland mainline.

== History ==
It was built in 1836–40 by the North Midland Railway (NMR) on its line between Derby and Leeds, close to the road between South Wingfield and Oakerthorpe. The station closed in 1967 and the buildings, by Francis Thompson, still stand, but had become derelict until restoration work, funded by a National Lottery grant, began in 2019, with completion announced in October 2023.

The line adjacent to the station is still in use as part of the Midland Main Line. Thompson designed thirteen stations for the NMR, of which Wingfield is the only one to survive as-built.

In times past, this area was important for coal mining at Oakerthorpe, South Wingfield, with a branch to Shirland.

== Current status ==
The empty station building and paved forecourt are Grade II* listed due to being one of the earliest surviving railway station buildings, and the only surviving example from the opening of the line. It was listed on Historic England's Heritage at Risk Register for some years as being in a 'very bad' state. In May 2018, the station was compulsorily purchased by Amber Valley Borough Council, due to neglect by its owner. A March 2017 repairs notice, served by the council with the support of Historic England, had not been acted upon.

In November 2019, the Derbyshire Historic Buildings Trust (DHBT) announced that it would be taking over the ownership from the council, following the receipt of lottery funding, and would be restoring the building with the aim of finding new uses, including holding living history events and open days. As of October 2023, the building has been restored to how it looked in 1840, and now operates as a tea room, shop, and heritage centre, with a model railway and views of the Midland mainline.

Preceding station	Historical railways	Following station
Ambergate; Line open, station open	North Midland Railway; Derby to Leeds line	Smithy Moor; Line open, station closed
Ambergate; Line open, station open	Midland Railway; Derby to Leeds line	Stretton; Line open, station closed

== See also ==
- Grade II* listed buildings in Amber Valley
- Listed buildings in South Wingfield
