= List of windmills in Derbyshire =

The List of Windmills in Derbyshire is a list of former and extant windmills in the English county of Derbyshire.

== Locations ==
Location	Name of mill and grid reference	Type	Maps	First mention or built	Last mention or demise	Photograph
Alderwasley; SK 317 526	Post	1791; 1808	1767	Standing 1811, gone by 1835.		
Alfreton	Hitch Hill Mill; SK 408 539	Tower		1816	Standing in 1824.	
Alfreton	Sleetmore Mill; SK 415 539	Post	1825	1790	Demolished1925.	
Ashbourne	Windmill Lane; SK 180 463	Tower	1808	1791	Standing 1817, not on 1825 map.	
Ashbourne	Ashley Mill; SK 173 465	Tower		1838	Standing in 1847.	
Ashover	Spancarr Mill; SK 342 660	Tower	1808	1807	Windmill World	
Beighton (now South Yorkshire)	Beighton Mill; SK 434 826	Post		1791	Burnt down by arson April 1831.	
Belper	Belper Mill; SK 353 478	Tower		1796	Windmill World	
Belper	SK 347 488	Smock		19th century	Base remains.	
Belph	SK 536 755	Open Trestle Post	1808		Standing in 1814.	
Bolsover	Sherwood Lodge Mill; Lime Kiln Fields Mill; SK 472 712	Tower		1793	Windmill World	
Bolsover	SK 479 706	Open Trestle Post	1825; 1836	1795		
Borrowash	Borrowash Mill; SK 422 345	Open Trestle Post	1825; 1835	1773	Gone by 1857	
Breadsall	Breadsall Mill; SK 376 394	Tower	1808; 1836		Demolished 1840s.	
Calow	Bole Hill Mill; SK 417 703	Post	1808; 1835; 1840	1812	Burnt down 15 April 1843	
Chellaston	Chellaston Mill; SK 381 298	Tower	1836; 1887; 1899	c.1827	Working in 1889. Single story stump was standing in 1970, gone by 1995.	
Chesterfield	Holywell Street Mill; SK 383 714	Post		c.1787	Advertised for sale 1789, no further trace.	
Chesterfield	New Brampton Mill; SK 372 710}	Post	1808	1800	Advertised for sale 1814, no further trace.	
Chesterfield	Club Mill; SK 372 717	Tower	1808; 1836	1800		
Clay Cross	Clay Cross Mill; SK 395 633	Post	1835†		Standing in 1857.	
Clowne	Clown mill SK 488 755	Post	1791; 1808; 1836; 1880; 1887	1767		
Codnor	Codnor Mill; SK 420 495	Post	1808	1801	Standing in 1834, not on 1836 map.	
Creswell	Cresswell Mill	Post		1828	Standing in 1864.	
Crich	Pothouse Mill			1757	Moved to Four Lanes End in 1764.	
Crich	Four Lanes End Mill	Tower		1764	Burnt out 15 February 1849.	
Dale Abbey	Cat and Fiddle Mill; SK 438 398	Midlands Post		1788	Windmill World	
Derby	Windmill Hill Lane Mill; SK 333 368	Tower	1791	1767	Advertised for sale in 1781.	
Derby	Depot Mill; SK 351 349	Tower		1816	Probably demolished between 1855 and 1888.	
Derby	Normanton Road Mill	Tower			Standing in 1949.	
Derby	Chain Lane Mill, Littleover; SK 342 336				Medieval mill.	
Eckington	Eckington Mill; SK 425 793	Post		1825.	Burnt down by arson, 19 January 1832.	
Eyam	Eyam Mill; SK 212 765	Tower	1827	Demolished c.1877		
Findern	Findern Mill; SK 302 307	Tower	1825; 1836; 1887	1797	Windmill World	
Fritchley	Fritchley Mill; SK 365 532	Post	1825; 1880	1793	Windmill World	
Hazelwood	Hazelwood Mill; SK 333 460	Smock	1906	1906	Pumping windmill, demolished 1939.	
Heage	Heage Windmill; SK 367 507	Tower		Built c. 1797. First use c. 1805	Heage Windmill Official Website	
Heanor		1791; 1808				
Holbrook	Holbrook Mill; SK 364 449	Post	1825; 1836; 1880	1825	Standing in 1841, not marked on any map later than 1880.	
Hopton	Carsington Pasture Mill; SK 252 545	Tower	1839; 1880	1780s	Windmill World	
Horsley Park	Hosley Mill; SK 377 439	Post	1808; 1836		Gone by 1841.	
Hulland Ward	Hulland Ward Mill; SK 266 475	Tower	1836	c.1825	Standing in 1850, not on 1880 map.	
Ilkeston	Lawn GardensMill; SK 464 423	Post		1817	Burnt down 1831.	
Ilkeston	Field Mill; SK 465 420	Post	1825; 1836		Moved to Derby Road, Ilkeston mid-C19th.	
Ilkeston	Derby Road Mill; SK 458 413	Post	1896; 1908	1876	Standing in September 1920.	
Kilburn	Kilburn Mill; SK 382 455	Tower		1821	Not marked on any maps after 1879.	
Long Eaton	Long Eaton Mill; SK 339 492		1808			
Loscoe	Loscoe Mill; SK 430 480	Post	1825; 1836		Advertised for sale in 1851.	
Lower Pilsley	Hagg Hill; SK 411 636		1897		Possibly a windpump.	
Mapperley	Mapperley Mill; SK 437 429	Post	1825; 1836		Standing in 1900, blown down by 1932.	
Marlpool	Marlpool Mill; SK 442 456		1791	1767.	Gone by 1801.	
Marlpool	Marlpool Mill; SK 442 456	Post			Burnt down by arson, 4 December 1828.	
Marlpool	Marlpool Mill; SK 442 456	Tower	1836; 1881	c.1830	Dismantled 1885.	
Melbourne	Melbourne Mill; SK 378 248	Tower	1808; 1825; 1836	1797	Windmill World	
Melbourne	SK 386 252	Post	1808; 1825; 1836	1808	1836	
Melbourne	Ticknall Road Mill; SK 370 245	Post		1782	Advertised for sale 1853.	
Mickleover	Mill Field Mill		1808	1808	Moved to Common Road in 1850.	
Mickleover	Common Road Mill; SK 310 356	Tower		1850	Demolished c.1973.	
Mosborough	Mosborough Mill; SK 415 807	Tower		c.1802	Standing in 1856, not marked on 1877 Ordnance Survey map.	
Muggington	Muggington Mill; SK 286 424	Tower	1835; 1836	c.1830	Standing in 1876.	
Netherseal	Netherseal Mill; SK 278 135	Post	1834		Was in Leicestershire when built. Working in 1904.	
Newhall	Newhall Mill; SK 281 213	Post	1808; 1825; 1836		Working in 1841.	
Nitticar Hill	Knitacre Mill; SK 488 786		1791; 1808	1767	Gone by 1830.	
Ockbrook	Ockbrook Mill; SK 429 357	Tower	1880	c.1770	Windmill World	
Pleasley	Pleasley Mill; SK 500 645	Post	1808; 1825; 1836	1808	Demolished late 1860s.	
Riddings	James; SK 424 531	Tower		1877	Demolished 1963	
Riddings	Sarah; SK 424 531	Tower		1877	Demolished 1963.	
Riddings	Riddings Mill; SK 427 527	Post	1835†	1829		
Ripley	Pease Hill Mill; SK 410 496	Tower	1808; 1825; 1914	1808	Demolished 1920s.	
Risley	Risley Mill; SK 466 362	Post	1808; 1825; 1835; 1836	1798	Advertised for sale 1835.	
Sandiacre	Sandiacre Mill; SK 481 356	Post	1825; 1835†	1820	Advertised for sale 1834.	
Sawley	Sawley Mill; SK 482 325		1825; 1836	1794	Working until 1861.	
Shardlow	Shardlow Union Mill; SK 432 303	Post		1803	Advertised for sale in 1851.	
Shipley	Shipley Mill; SK 449 448		1808	1808	Blown down 16 May 1809.	
Shirebrook	Shirebrook Mill; SK 532 680			1828	1841.	
Smalley	Cloves Lane; SK 408 446		1808	c.1700	Moved to Smalley watermill 1800.	
Smalley	at Smalley watermill			1800	Moved back to Cloves Lane 1815.	
Smalley	Cloves Lane; SK 408 466			1815	Demolished c.1856.	
Smalley	Swine Hill Lane			1800	1800, burnt down before 1828, remains to Marlpool, which burnt down in that year.	
Smisby	Ann's Well Place; SK 343 183	Post	1791; 1808; 1895	1767	Blown down c.1920.	
South Normanton	Fordbridge Lane Mill; SK 442 569	Tower	1880	1820s	Windmill World	
South Normanton	Normanton Common Mill; SK 442 561	Tower	1880; 1905	1850s	Windmill World	
South Normanton	SK 442 561	Post	1808; 1825	c.1805	Working until 1908. Dismantled 1980, remains declared beyond restoration in 1997 and burnt. Windmill World	
South Normanton	SK 439 562	Post		1630	Severely damaged December 1809, ruins auctioned January 1810.	
Spinkhill	Spinkhill Mill; SK 452 784	Tower	1791; 1808	1767	House converted 1879, demolished mid-1950s.	
Spondon	Spondon Mill; SK 369 394	Post		1824	Standing in 1861.	
Swarkestone	Swarkestone Mill; SK 381 297	Tower	1808; 1825	1794	Disused by 1889, reduced to single storey stump by 1932, demolished by 1983.	
Swarkestone Lowes	SK 336 298	Post	1675	1675	1745.	
Swathick	Swathick Mill; SK 365 678		1808	1808	1808.	
Temple Normanton	Temple Normanton Mill; SK 418 675	Tower	1808; 1825	1796	House converted mid-1860s. Demolished 1935.	
Tibshelf	Nethermoor; SK 428 605	Post	1791; 1808; 1836	1767	Demolished 1915, leaving roundhouse standing. This was demolished in the 1960s.	
West Hallam	West Hallam Mill		1791; 1808	1767	1808	
Whitwell	Whitwell Mill; SK 533 768	Tower	1840; 1916	1829	Working until 1912, demolished 1965.	
Whittington	Whittington Mill; SK 386 745	Tower	1808; 1825; 1840; 1895	1808	Demolished c.1900.	
Willington	Willington Mill; SK 396 305		1791; 1825	1710	1825.	
Wirksworth	Wirksworth Mill; SK 274 538	Post	1808; 1836	1799	Advertised for sale 1849.	
Woodville	Butt House Mill; SK 323 190	Post	1835†; 1836	c.1827	Demolished c.1880.	

== Sources ==
- Gifford, Alan (2003). Derbyshire Windmills Past & Present. Heage: Heage Windmill Society / Midland Mills Group. ISBN 0-9544863-0-7.

Maps

- 1675 John Ogilby
- 1791 Burdett (surveyed 1762-67)
- 1808 James Farey
- 1825 Greenwood
- 1827 Greenwood
- 1834 Ordnance Survey
- 1835 Greenwood
- 1835† George Sanderson (surveyed 1830-35)
- 1836 Ordnance Survey
- 1839 Ordnance Survey
- 1840 Ordnance Survey
- 1880 Ordnance Survey
- 1881 Ordnance Survey
- 1887 Ordnance Survey
- 1895 Ordnance Survey (surveyed 1879-83)
- 1896 Ordnance Survey (surveyed 1876)
- 1897 Ordnance Survey (surveyed 1875-85)
- 1899 Ordnance Survey
- 1905 Ordnance Survey
- 1906 Ordnance Survey
- 1908 Ordnance Survey (surveyed 1905-06)
- 1914 Ordnance Survey
- 1916 Ordnance Survey
