= Listed buildings in South Wingfield =

South Wingfield is a civil parish in the Amber Valley district of Derbyshire, England. The parish contains 40 listed buildings that are recorded in the National Heritage List for England. Of these, one is listed at Grade I, the highest of the three grades, two are at Grade II*, the middle grade, and the others are at Grade II, the lowest grade. The parish contains the villages of South Wingfield and Oakerthorpe and the surrounding countryside. A railway built by the North Midland Railway runs through the parish, and the listed buildings associated with it are bridges, tunnel portals, and a station and associated structures. The other listed buildings include a ruined manor house, smaller houses, cottages and associated structures, farmhouses and farm buildings, a church, road bridges, public houses, and a former windmill.

== Key ==
Grade	Criteria
I	Buildings of exceptional interest, sometimes considered to be internationally important
II*	Particularly important buildings of more than special interest
II	Buildings of national importance and special interest

== Buildings ==
Name and location	Photograph	Date	Notes	Grade
All Saints' Church; 53.09789°N 1.42915°W		13th century	The church has been altered and extended through the centuries, including alterations in 1803, 1877 and 1898. It is built in gritstone, with roofs in lead, tile and slate. The church consists of a nave with a clerestory, north and south aisles, a south porch, a chancel and north vestry, and a west tower. The tower is in Perpendicular style, and has three stages, stepped diagonal buttresses, moulded string courses, a two-light west window, two-light bell openings, and embattled parapets with crocketed corner pinnacles. The windows in the clerestory and aisles have round-arched heads.	II*
South Wingfield Manor House, Manor Farmhouse and outbuilding 53.08894°N 1.44242°W		1439–53	The manor house is in ruins, and built in gritstone with some tile roofs remaining. There is a double courtyard plan with outer entrance gateways to the southeast corner of the south courtyard, and offices and quarters for the household in the south, east and west ranges. There is a cross range dividing the courtyards, and the inner courtyard contains a tower 72 feet (22 m) high at the south end. In the north courtyard is a farmhouse with a pantile and a stone slate roof. At the east end of the south range is an aisled outbuilding with two storeys and five bays, containing a four-centred arch with a quoined surround and mullioned windows.	I
The Peacock Hotel and cottage 53.09902°N 1.42034°W		1613	Originally a coaching inn, later a public house, it was remodelled in the 18th century. The building is in sandstone with some brick, and has quoins and stone slate roofs. There is an irregular plan, consisting of a double pile range, a recessed range to the south, and a cottage with an L-shaped plan to the north. The double pile range has three storeys and two bays, and the recessed range has two storeys and three bays, and a buttressed south gable end. This range contains a segmental carriage arch with a rusticated surround and a keystone, a doorway to the right, and mullioned windows. At the top is a small pediment containing a dated roundel. The cottage has massive quoins, and contains mullioned windows and a sash window.	II
Prospect House; 53.09265°N 1.44132°W	—	Mid 17th century	The house was later refashioned and extended, and is in sandstone with quoins, and a tile roof with coped gables and moulded kneelers to the south. There are two storeys, and an L-shaped plan, with a front range of four bays, and a lower rear wing at the east end. The doorway has a bracketed hood, to its right is a stair window, and the other windows are 20th-century replacements. The rear wing is partly rendered, and it contains a bow window and a doorway with a bracketed head.	II
Outbuilding south of Windy Gap Farm; 53.09760°N 1.43863°W	—	Late 17th century	The building is in sandstone with quoins and a tile roof. In the centre of the front facing the road is a blocked doorway, and inside there are two cruck trusses.	II
Pear Tree Cottage; 53.08967°N 1.41895°W	—	c. 1740	A house and cottage combined into one house, it is in sandstone with quoins, and a tile roof with coped gables and moulded kneelers. There are two storeys and five bays. The main doorway has a massive quoined surround and lintel, a similar doorway has been blocked, and a window inserted, and there is a later inserted doorway. One window has a single light, and the others are mullioned.	II
Shaw Wood Farmhouse; 53.08799°N 1.42851°W	—	c. 1750	The farmhouse is in gritstone and has a stone slate roof with coped gables. There are three storeys, three bays, a lower bay at the north end, and a lean-to. The central doorway has a quoined surround and a massive lintel, over which is a single-light window, and the other windows are mullioned with two lights.	II
Beech Hill Farmhouse; 53.07253°N 1.45200°W	—	Mid 18th century	The farmhouse is in gritstone with quoins, a moulded eaves band, and a Welsh slate roof with coped gables and moulded kneelers. There are two storeys, and a T-shaped plan, with a front range of two bays and a rear wing. The central doorway has a quoined surround, the windows on the front are sashes. At the rear is a doorway with a massive surround, a three-stage stair window and a two-light mullioned window.	II
Fritchley Windmill Tower; 53.07551°N 1.45613°W		18th century	The former windmill, now a ruin, is in gritstone on massive plinth pads, and consists of a squat circular tower. It contains a doorway and windows, all with plain surrounds.	II
Malthouse Farmhouse and wall 53.09604°N 1.43972°W		Mid 18th century	The farmhouse is in sandstone with quoins, and a tile roof with coped gables and moulded kneelers. There are three storeys, a double depth plan, and three bays. The central doorway has a moulded surround and a moulded cornice. The windows at the rear are mullioned, but the mullions have been removed from the front. The attached boundary wall has saddleback coping, and is stepped with curved copings as risers. In the centre is a gateway with plain gateposts and a cast iron gate. On the wall north of the gateway are cast iron railings urn finials.	II
Outbuilding south of Malthouse Farmhouse; 53.09594°N 1.43989°W	—	Mid 18th century	The farm building is in sandstone with some rebuilding in brick, and a tile roof. There are two storeys, an east range of three bays, and a south wing. In the angle is a doorway with a quoined surround approached by stone steps. Elsewhere, there is a two-light mullioned window, and blocked or converted openings.	II
Park Cottage; 53.09340°N 1.44103°W	—	Mid 18th century	A pair of cottages combined into one house, it is in sandstone with a tile roof. There are two storeys and three bays. On the front are two doorways with massive jambs and lintels, one converted into a window, and two-light mullioned windows with casements.	II
The Manor Hotel; 53.09358°N 1.44126°W		Mid 18th century	The former public house is in sandstone with quoins, and a Welsh slate roof with coped gables. There is an L-shaped plan, consisting of a main range with three storeys and two bays, a lower two-storey rear wing at the left end, and a single-storey bay to the right. The central doorway has a quoined surround and a shallow bracketed hood, on which is a carved lion. Some of the windows are mullioned, and others are replacements.	II
Wingfield House; 53.09496°N 1.44024°W	—	Mid 18th century	A front range was added to the house in the 19th century, and both parts are in sandstone. The later part is pebbledashed on a plinth, and has a hipped tile roof. There are two storeys and five bays, and full height pilasters. The central doorway has a rectangular fanlight, a frieze and a moulded cornice., and the windows are sashes. The rear range has an L-shaped plan, a Welsh slate roof with a coped gable at the west end, two storeys and attics, and a south front of three bays. It contains mullioned windows, and in the attic are gabled dormers with bargeboards and finials.	II
Zion Cottage; 53.09458°N 1.44033°W	—	18th century	The cottage is in rendered sandstone with quoins, and a Welsh slate roof with a coped gable to the west, and there are two storeys. On the front are two doorways, one with a gabled porch, and the other with a massive stone lintel. Some windows have a single light, and the others are mullioned and contain sashes.	II
Wingfield Hall; 53.09131°N 1.44078°W	—	c. 1772	The house is in sandstone on a plinth, with quoins, a slate roof, and an irregular plan. The south front has three storeys and four bays, and has a floor band, a moulded cornice, and a shallow parapet. The windows in the ground floor are mullioned, and in the upper floors they are sashes. On the front is a former doorway with a quoined surround, converted into a semicircular niche with a keystone and a moulded hood mould. At the west end is a range of two bays with two storeys and a basement and a hipped roof, containing sash window and gabled dormers, and beyond is a single-story range with a basement. The north front has two storeys and contains a porch and a doorway with a chamfered surround, over which is an ogee-headed window.	II
Chestnut Farmhouse; 53.10153°N 1.46302°W	—	Late 18th century	The farmhouse is in gritstone with a coved eaves band and a stone slate roof. There are three storeys, four bays, a lower two-storey range and a rear lean-to. On the front are two doorways with quoined surrounds and heavy lintels, and in the south gable end is a blocked doorway with a quoined surround. The windows are sashes.	II
Bridge southwest of All Saints' Church; 53.09746°N 1.43008°W	—	Late 18th century	The bridge carries Holme Lane (B5035 road) over the River Amber. It is in gritstone and consists of a single semicircular arch with voussoirs and a broad band. The parapet walls are splayed at the ends, they have chamfered copings, and end in plain square piers.	II
Outbuildings south of Manor Cottage; 53.09262°N 1.44103°W		Late 18th century	A pair of farm buildings in sandstone with pantile roofs and stone slate eaves, and a double pile plan. The buildings contain a double cart shed opening with massive lintels and a central stone pillar, and various windows, including casements, a two-light mullioned window, and a horizontally-sliding sash.	II
Stable block, Wingfield Hall; 53.09133°N 1.44140°W	—	Late 18th century	The former stables are in sandstone on a plinth, with quoins, a moulded eaves cornice, and hipped slate roofs. There are two storeys, and a north front of seven bays, the middle bay a projecting tower with a pyramidal roof. In the ground floor is an arcade of seven doorways with fanlights, and with a moulded cornice acting as lintels. The upper floor contains sash windows with lintels channelled as voussoirs. On the east gable is a stone stairway, and the west gable contains a carriage entrance with a depressed elliptical arch. The south front has a basement, the openings in the basement and top floor have segmental heads, and in the ground floor they have round-arched heads.	II
Outbuilding west of Wingfield Hall stables 53.09127°N 1.44171°W	—	Late 18th century	The farm building is in sandstone with quoins, a plain eaves band, and a roof of asbestos sheet. There is a single storey and a loft and three bays, and it contains a doorway with a quoined surround and slit vents. To the south is a single-storey two-bay extension with a slate roof and a coped gable, containing a doorway with a quoined surround and a heavy lintel, and a single-light opening.	II
Walls west of Wingfield Hall stables 53.09132°N 1.44192°W	—	Late 18th century	The garden walls are in sandstone with flat copings and an inner skin of brickwork. They are between 1.5 metres (4 ft 11 in) and 3 metres (9.8 ft) high, and enclose an area of 50 metres (160 ft) by 41 metres (135 ft).	II
Outbuilding west of Wingfield House; 53.09505°N 1.44067°W	—	Late 18th century	The outbuilding, which incorporates earlier fragments, is in sandstone with quoins and a tile roof. It contains three doorways with quoined surrounds, and two windows, one of which is re-set and is mullioned with three lights.	II
Stables and Coach House, Wingfield House; 53.09512°N 1.44043°W	—	Late 18th century	The former stables and coach house are in sandstone and have a hipped Welsh slate roof. There are two storeys and three bays. The building contains a carriageway with a stilted segmental head, a quoined surround, rusticated voussoirs, and a keystone, four sash windows with plain surrounds, and two doorways with quoined surrounds and massive lintels. In the east gable end is a two-light mullioned window.	II
Hovel south of Wingfield Hall stables 53.09111°N 1.44136°W	—	Early 19th century	The building is in sandstone with quoins, and a tile roof with slate eaves and coped gables. There are four bays and an arcade of square columns on padstones, with flattened square capitals. In the west gable apex is a semicircular-headed blind opening.	II
Amber River Bridge; 53.07986°N 1.43503°W	—	1836–40	The bridge was built by the North Midland Railway to carry its line over the River Amber. It is in gritstone with red brick in the soffit, and consists of a single segmental arch with rusticated voussoirs ending as quoins. The arch springs from impost bands, and it has a keystone. Framing the arch are piers, and the wing walls end in semi-octagonal piers.	II
Beatties Bridge; 53.08599°N 1.43056°W	—	1836–40	An accommodation bridge built by the North Midland Railway to carry its line over a farm track. It is in gritstone with red brick in the soffit, and consists of a single semicircular arch with rusticated voussoirs springing from impost bands, and it has a keystone. Above the arch is moulding that continues to form the coping of the wing walls. On the parapet are 20th-century railings.	II
Potters Bridge; 53.07564°N 1.44105°W	—	1836–40	An accommodation bridge built by the North Midland Railway to carry its line over a farm track. It is in gritstone with red brick in the soffit, and consists of a single segmental arch with rusticated voussoirs ending as quoins. The arch springs from impost bands, and it has a keystone. Above the arch is moulding that continues to form the coping of the wing walls. On the parapet are 20th-century railings.	II
South Wingfield Footpath Bridge; 53.09508°N 1.42775°W		1836–40	An accommodation bridge built by the North Midland Railway to carry its line over a footpath. It is in gritstone with red brick in the soffit, and consists of a single semicircular arch with rusticated voussoirs ending as quoins. There is a shallow parapet with 20th-century iron railings., and the walls end is low square piers. At the east end is a riveted iron or steel girder on blue engineering brick abutments.	II
North Portal, Wingfield Tunnel; 53.07254°N 1.44845°W	—	1836–40	The tunnel was built for the North Midland Railway. The portal is in gritstone and consists of a horseshoe arch. There are two orders of roll moulding, and a band running along the voussoirs. Flanking the arch are projecting piers with rusticated quoins, and wing walls. At the top is moulding and a parapet.	II
South Portal, Wingfield Tunnel; 53.07140°N 1.45136°W	—	1836–40	The tunnel was built for the North Midland Railway. The portal is in gritstone and consists of a horseshoe arch. There are two orders of roll moulding, and a band running along the voussoirs. Flanking the arch are projecting piers with rusticated quoins, and wing walls. At the top is moulding and a parapet.	II
Wingfield Station; 53.09757°N 1.42639°W		1839–40	The station was designed by Francis Thompson for the North Midland Railway. It is in gritstone with pilasters and hipped slate roofs. There is a single storey and five bays, the middle bay taller and projecting. In the middle bay is a doorway with a rectangular fanlight and flanking windows, and in the outer bays are casement windows. The forecourt is paved with large stone flags, and to the north is a small square building with a pyramidal roof. Attached to it is a wall and a short flight of stone steps.	II*
Dale Bridge; 53.10335°N 1.42417°W		c. 1840	The bridge carries Matlock Road (A615 road) over the River Amber. It is in gritstone, and consists of two shallow segmental arches with rusticated voussoirs. Above the arches is continuous moulding, and a massive parapet with chamfered coping. The ends of the parapet walls are splayed and have terminal low circular piers.	II
Railway bridge south of South Wingfield Stationmaster's House; 53.09669°N 1.42698°W		c. 1840	The bridge was built by the North Midland Railway to carry its line over Holme Lane (B5035 road). It is in gritstone with brick lining, and consists of a single segmental arch with rusticated voussoirs. The arch springs from a moulded plinth band, and above it is moulding and a shallow parapet with metal railings.	II
Railway Bridge southeast of Dale Bridge; 53.10314°N 1.42388°W		c. 1840	The bridge was built by the North Midland Railway to carry its line over Matlock Road (A615 road). It is in gritstone with brick lining, and consists of a single rusticated arch. The arch springs from a moulded plinth band, and above it is moulding, and a shallow parapet with metal railings. The parapet walls have splayed ends, and terminate in semi-octagonal piers.	II
Railway bridge west of Weirmill Bridge; 53.07871°N 1.43634°W		c. 1840	The bridge was built by the North Midland Railway to carry its line over Park Lane. It is in gritstone with brick lining, and consists of a single rusticated arch. The arch springs from a moulded plinth band, and above it is moulding, and a shallow plinth parapet. The abutment walls are splayed.	II
Stationmaster's House, Wingfield Station; 53.09729°N 1.42641°W	—	c. 1840	The house was designed by Francis Thompson for the North Midland Railway. It is in gritstone with hipped slate roofs. There are two storeys, three bays, and a projecting wing to the right. On the front is a triangular stone porch and casement windows, and in the right return is a doorway with a hood on wooden brackets.	II
Wall, Wingfield Station; 53.09736°N 1.42654°W	—	c. 1840	The boundary wall is in gritstone, about 70 yards (64 m) long and 1.5 feet (0.46 m) high. The wall extends along the western boundary of the station area between the Station and the Stationmaster's House.	II
Manor Cottage; 53.09274°N 1.44096°W	—	Mid 19th century	The house is in gritstone with a Welsh slate roof, two storeys and four bays. The doorway has a chamfered surround and a rectangular fanlight. Above the doorway is a single-light window, and the other windows are mullioned with casements.	II
Wall and gate piers, Wingfield House; 53.09504°N 1.44009°W	—	Undated	The boundary wall is in sandstone, it is between 1.5 metres (4 ft 11 in) and 2 metres (6 ft 7 in) high, and extends for about 70 metres (230 ft). At the lower end it is stepped back and has half-round coping. There are two pairs of square gate piers with projecting bands, and moulded caps with banded ball finials.	II
