= Immanuel Halton =

English astronomer and mathematician

Immanuel Halton (1628–1699) was an English astronomer and mathematician, an associate of John Flamsteed.

== Life ==
He was born at Greystoke in Cumberland on 21 April 1628, the eldest son of Miles Halton of Greenthwaite Hall; Timothy Halton has been identified as probably a younger brother. Halton was educated at Blencowe grammar school in Cumberland, became a student at Gray's Inn, and then entered the service of Thomas Howard, 23rd Earl of Arundel. He transacted on his behalf affairs of importance in Holland, and on his return to England accepted and kept for twenty years the post of auditor of his household, involving duties connected with commissions and arbitrations.

In 1660 the successor of his patron made him a grant of part of the manor of Shirland in Derbyshire; he came to reside at Wingfield Manor in the same county early in 1666, and purchased some of the adjacent lands from the Henry Howard, 6th Duke of Norfolk on 28 May 1678. Halton put up sundials at Wingfield Manor; and a letter written from Gray's Inn in May 1650, describing a dial of his own invention, was published in the appendix to Samuel Foster's Miscellanea, London, 1659. Halton made several alterations and improvements in Wingfield Manor, and repaired the damage inflicted upon it by the Civil War. It remained in his family until the nineteenth century.

Having heard of Flamsteed's astronomical proficiency, Halton called to see him at Derby in 1666, and afterwards sent him Giovanni Battista Riccioli's New Almagest, Johannes Kepler's Rudolphine Tables, and other books on astronomy. Flamsteed calles him a good algebraist. Halton's observations at Wingfield on the solar eclipse of 23 June 1675 were communicated to the Royal Society by Flamsteed. In a letter to John Collins of 20 February 1673 Flamsteed mentioned that Halton was then translating Gerard Kinkhuysen's Moon-Wiser into English for him. A little later he speaks of observing with his quadrants, and on 27 December 1673 told Collins that 'lately, in discourse with Mr. Halton, he was pleased to show me a straight-lined projection for finding the hour by inspection, the sun's declination and height being given'.

He married Mary, daughter of John Newton of Oakerthorpe in Derbyshire, and had by her three sons, two of whom left children. He died in 1699, aged 72, and was buried in All Saints' Church, South Wingfield.
