= Timothy Halton =

English churchman and academic

Timothy Halton D.D. (1632?–1704) was an English churchman and academic, Provost of Queen's College, Oxford, from 1677.

== Life ==
He has been identified with the Timothy Halton, son of Miles Halton of Greenthwaite Hall, Cumberland, northern England, who was baptised at Greystoke Church 19 September 1633, and in that case he was a younger brother of Immanuel Halton. He entered Queen's College as batler 9 March 1649, and was elected Fellow in April 1657. He proceeded B.D. 30 April 1662, D.D. 27 June 1674.

On 17 March 1661, Halton wrote to Joseph Williamson that he had offers of chaplaincies from William Lucy, bishop of St. David's, and from Elisabeth of Bohemia. Eventually he refused them both, preferring to retain his position at Oxford. The first offer, however, led to a Welsh connection: he became archdeacon of Brecon on 8 February 1672, and was canon of St David's (his epitaph). He was made archdeacon of Oxford on 10 July 1675, and Provost of Queen's College on 7 April 1677, succeeding Thomas Barlow. He was also rector of the college living, Charlton-on-Otmoor, Oxfordshire. He was Vice-Chancellor of Oxford University during 1679–81 and 1685. He died on 21 July 1704, and was buried in Queen's College chapel; his epitaph states that he was a considerable benefactor to the college. Letters from Halton to Williamson, written between 1655 and 1667, have been preserved in the Public Record Office.

== Sources ==
- This article incorporates text from a publication now in the public domain: "Halton, Timothy". Dictionary of National Biography. London: Smith, Elder & Co. 1885–1900.

Academic offices
Preceded by Thomas Barlow	Provost of The Queen's College, Oxford; 1677–1704	Succeeded by William Lancaster
Preceded by John Nicholas	Vice-Chancellor of Oxford University; 1679–1682	Succeeded by John Lloyd
Preceded by John Lloyd	Vice-Chancellor of Oxford University; 1685–1686	Succeeded by John Venn
