= South Wingfield =

Village in Derbyshire, England

Coordinates: 53.0956°N 1.440°W

- Village and Civil Parish
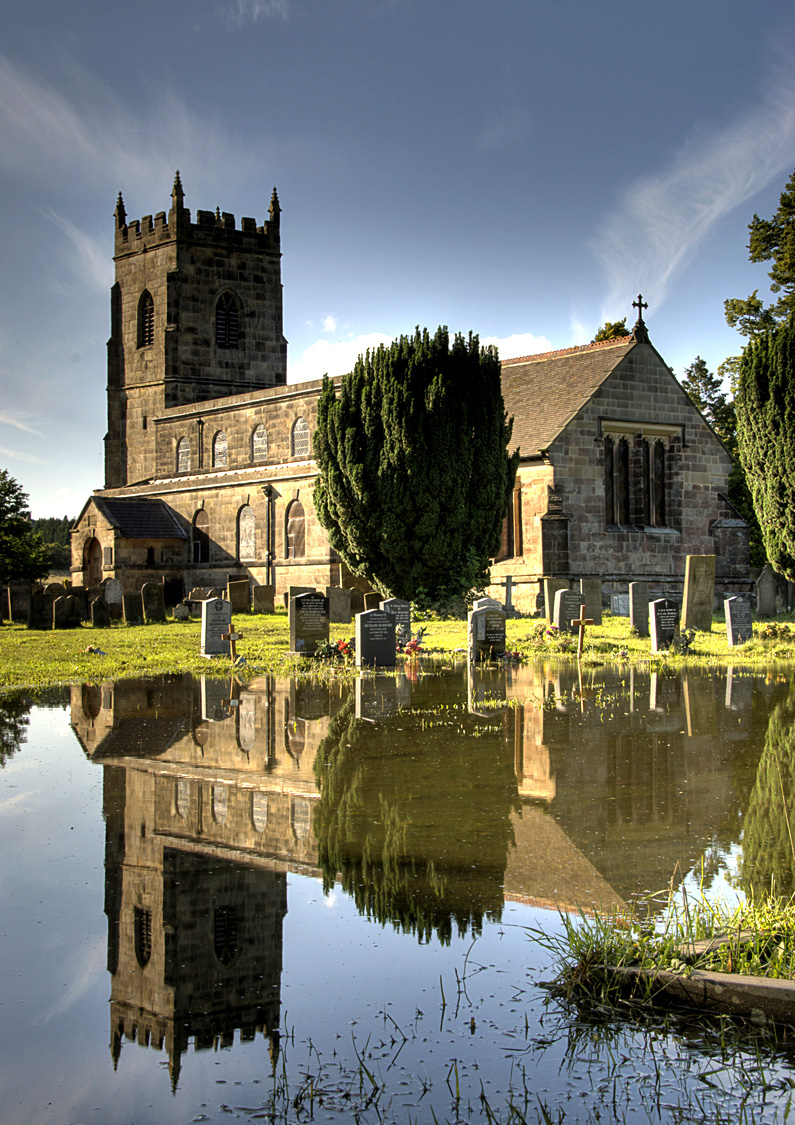
- South Wingfield church during the 2007 floods

- Location within Derbyshire
- Population: 1,514 (2011)
- OS grid reference: SK375555
- Civil parish: South Wingfield
- District: Amber Valley
- Shire county: Derbyshire
- Region: East Midlands
- Country: England
- Sovereign state: United Kingdom
- Post town: ALFRETON
- Postcode district: DE55
- Police: Derbyshire
- Fire: Derbyshire
- Ambulance: East Midlands

South Wingfield is a village and civil parish in Derbyshire, England, it is now part of the borough of Amber Valley and formerly in the Scarsdale hundred. The population of the civil parish at the 2011 census was 1,514.

== History and description ==
The Domesday Book: South Wingfield is listed amongst the small proportion of manors that are owned by Roger de Poitou. In 1086, the book notes that

"In South? Wingfield Alnoth had two carucates of land to the geld. There is land for three ploughs. Robert holds it of Count Alan under William Peverel and has 1 plough. There is a priest and 8 villans and 2 bordars and 3 ploughs. There is 4 acres (16,000 m^{2}) of meadow. It was and is worth 20 shillings.

— Note: Above the reference for Wingfield there is a note which says "Roger de Poitou had these lands now they are in the King's hand. ("South" was not part of the name at this time: The Domesday Books Online; Derbyshire S–Z)

An ex-mining village, it has a mixed community. Its most famous landmark is Wingfield Manor, a ruined manor house built around 1450 and now managed by English Heritage (though as of June 2019 the manor was closed to the public during conservation work). The village is about 2 miles (3.2 km) from Crich, and 6 miles (9.7 km) from Matlock. It sits astride one 'B' class road, the B5035, and the River Amber runs through the lower parts of the parish. The centre of the village is at the Market Place, where Manor Road, Church Lane, Inns Lane and the High Road meet.

Other notable places in the village are the parish church of All Saints, dating from the 13th century, the Methodist Chapel, a Baptist Chapel and a Gospel Hall. The village school was built in 1875. The parish of South Wingfield extends to cover the wider area covering the village of Oakerthorpe and the hamlets of Moorwood Moor, Wingfield Park and Uftonfields. Nearby Wingfield railway station buildings date from 1840.

Both North Wingfield and South Wingfield have forms of the same place-name, formed from "winn" (pasture) and "feld" (open land). The earlier forms of each are not distinguished but in 1284 a Middle English form of South Wingfield occurs.

== See also ==
- Listed buildings in South Wingfield
- List of places in Derbyshire
- Pentrich and South Wingfield Revolution Group
