= Wingfield Manor =

Ruined manor house in Derbyshire, England

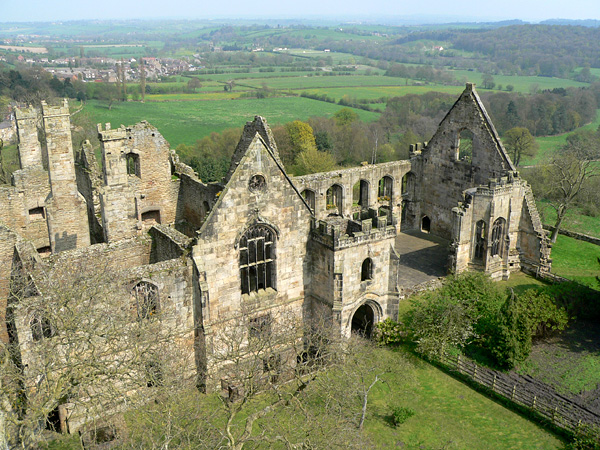
- Wingfield Manor

General information
- Status: Ruined
- Type: Manor house
- Classification: Grade I listed
- Location: Near South Wingfield, Derbyshire, England
- Coordinates: 53.0890°N 1.4425°W
- Construction started: 1441
- Renovated: Great Hall renovated after Civil War
- Closed: 1770s
- Destroyed: After the English Civil War (partial demolition)
- Client: Sir Ralph Cromwell, John Talbot, 2nd Earl of Shrewsbury
- Owner: English Heritage

Design and construction
- Architects: Possibly Robert Stowell (initial construction), Francis Smith (renovations)
- Designations: Heritage at Risk Register
- Known for: Residence of Mary, Queen of Scots

Wingfield Manor is a Grade I listed ruined manor house left deserted since the 1770s, near the village of South Wingfield and some four miles (6.4 km) west of the town of Alfreton in the English county of Derbyshire. There is a working farm that forms part of the old manor.

It is now in the care (but not ownership) of English Heritage, listed on Historic England's Heritage at Risk Register, and is not open currently to the public. Derbyshire Historic Buildings Trust has expressed an interest in acquiring the site from its private owner.

== History ==
Construction of the manor began in 1439 for Treasurer to Henry VI, Sir Ralph Cromwell, though the building was not completed until after his death when John Talbot, the second Earl of Shrewsbury, bought the property. His family maintained the manor within the property for nearly two hundred years. After which, Parliament decreed that the manor be dismantled and allowed to fall into ruin, and parts were taken for building materials, leaving behind the present ruins. It is also considered to house the first flushing toilet, built in 1596.

=== Mary, Queen of Scots, at Wingfield ===
The sixth Earl of Shrewsbury was entrusted with the care of Mary, Queen of Scots, when she was detained from 1569 onward, in his various houses around Derbyshire, Wingfield among them. In August 1569 the Earl was anxious to move Mary from Wingfield. He wanted to take her to Sheffield because Wingfield needed cleaning. There were over 240 people in residence and the manor "waxed unsavoury." At Sheffield, the Earl had two houses, Sheffield Castle and Sheffield Manor and could easily move the queen between them when cleaning was necessary. Mary was still at Wingfield at the time of the Rebellion of the North in November 1569. The Earl of Shrewsbury heard of a plot to release Mary at that time. The Earl of Northumberland and his wife had come to stay nearby at Wentworth House. The alleged escape plan involved the Countess of Northumberland pretending to be a nurse and coming to attend Christine Hogg, the pregnant wife of the embroiderer Bastian Pagez. The Countess was "something like the queen in personage" and would take Mary's place while she escaped.

Queen Elizabeth wrote to the Earl of Shrewsbury on 14 March 1570 giving permission for him to move Mary back to Wingfield because the water supply at Tutbury Castle was inadequate. The Earl had hoped to take Mary to Chatsworth House and also made preparations there.

Mary was back at Wingfield in 1584 and Ralph Sadler described in October how the "castle" was guarded by soldiers armed with pistols, muskets and halberds, and the difficult terrain nearby which would deter escape. Sometimes Mary was allowed to walk in the Great Chamber for exercise, and Sadler's assistant John Somers reported her conversations to Francis Walsingham. Sadler wrote about the unsatisfactory conditions in November, when Mary was to move to Tutbury Castle. Mary's bedchamber at Wingfield was too close to the kitchens and the "smoke and scent of meat" from below, despite being the best lodging in the house.

Anthony Babington, whose family lived at Dethick nearby, organised the abortive Babington Plot, a Recusant Catholic plot against Elizabeth I. The walnut tree in the north courtyard is reputed to have grown from a seed left when Anthony Babington smeared walnut juice over his face to disguise himself and enter the castle to see Mary, Queen of Scots. However, the tree is not old enough for this story to be true. Also, Babington did not meet Mary at Wingfield.

=== The Civil War ===
At the time of the English Civil War (1642–48), the manor was in the hands of Philip Herbert, 4th Earl of Pembroke, a Parliament supporter. The manor was taken by the Royalists in 1643 and then, after a short siege (albeit interrupted by the Battle of Marston Moor), retaken by Parliament in August 1644, after several large siege engines had destroyed part of the western curtain wall. Wingfield Manor located in what was then a strategic position near a main north-south artery of the country and also a key east-west link at the southern end of the Pennines. It was partially demolished at the end of the Civil War on instructions from Parliament in order that it could never be used again for defensive purposes - not that it was built as a castle in the first place.

Along the curtain walls and on the towers can still be seen the damage caused by cannonballs. One in particular on the north wall, shows by its shape, the direction of fire, indicating the direction of the cannons used in the 1644 siege, four 32 pounders, borrowed for the occasion. Initially these cannon were positioned on the hill to the east, the site of an old Roman fort, but the distance was too great and the only damage incurred was to a half moon battery outside the main gate, which is overgrown but still visible. The guns were moved to the west, to manor top, and it was from here that the southern part of the west curtain wall was demolished, after which the Royalists surrendered. After the war the manor was deliberately ruined so it would never again be used for defence. The Great Hall of the manor was renovated some years later for Immanuel Halton, an astronomer. In the 18th Century it was abandoned (apart from the farmhouse in the centre) and then further damaged when stone was taken for building Wingfield Hall, in the valley below.

=== Current remains ===
The remains include a usable tower, part of a greater tower that included, before the English Civil War, one of the earliest flushing systems in England. A cistern of water, positioned at the top of the tower, was emptied through the toilet area into the moat. The remains of the great hall, once one of the largest in the country, contains an oriel window, where light would once have shone through coloured glass and illuminated the high table. The undercroft below the great hall was used for the storage of wine, beer and food, and had stairs on each corner going up to the great hall. The kitchens were connected to the great hall by a passageway. The remains of two bread ovens can be seen, along with two large fireplaces. There is also a great stone barn, notable for the internal timbering; and the gate above the entrance to the north court contains a carved representation of moneybags, the symbol of the exchequer, Lord Cromwell.

== See also ==
- Grade I listed buildings in Derbyshire
- Listed buildings in South Wingfield
