= St Mary's Church, Crich =

St Mary’s Church, Crich
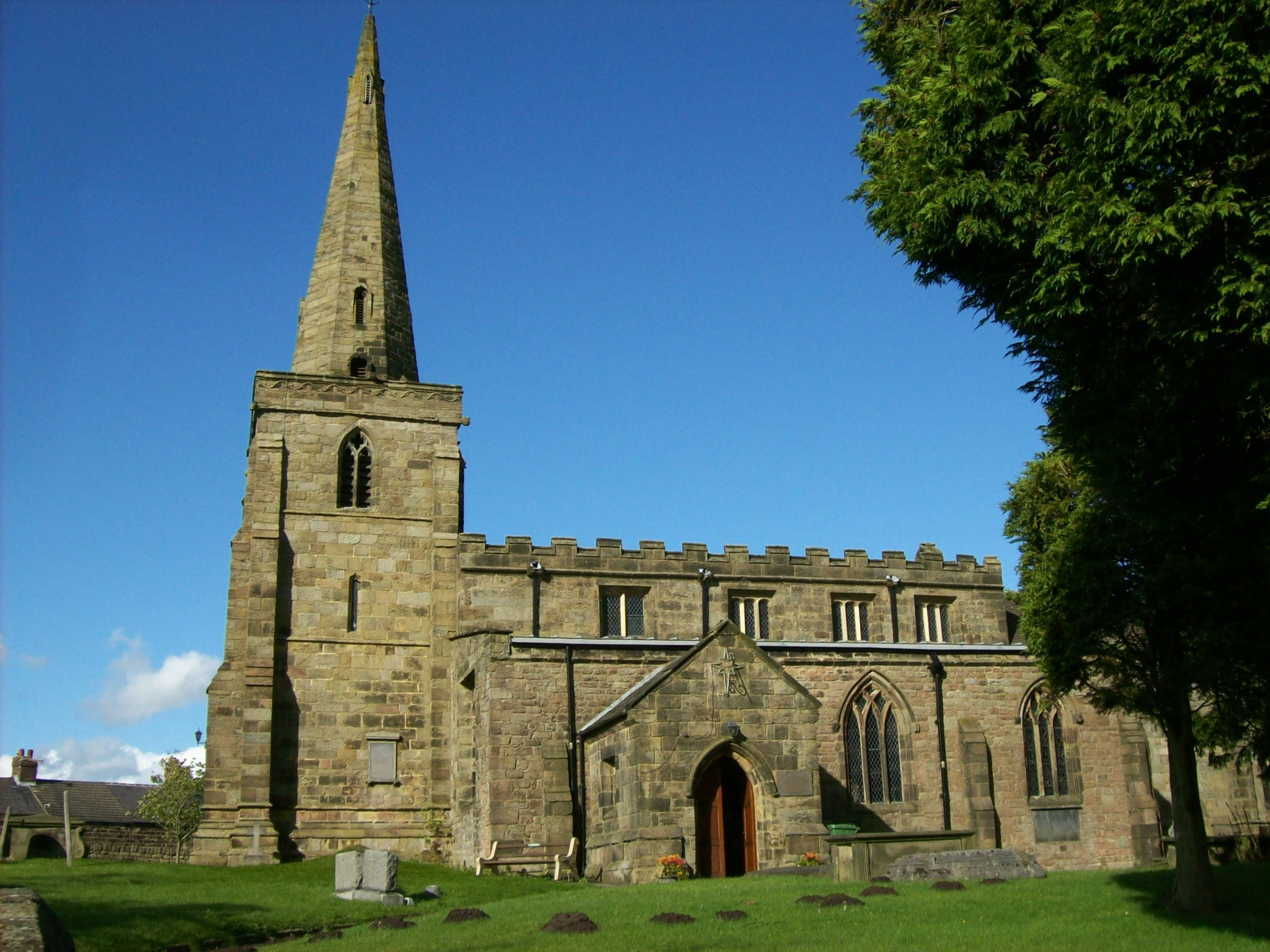
- St Mary’s Church, Crich
- St Mary’s Church, Crich
- 53°5′15.92″N 1°28′53.63″W
- Location: Crich
- Country: England
- Denomination: Church of England
- Website: crichstmarys.org.uk

History
- Dedication: St Mary the Virgin

Architecture
- Heritage designation: Grade I listed
- Completed: 1135

Administration
- Diocese: Diocese of Derby
- Archdeaconry: Chesterfield
- Deanery: Alfreton
- Parish: Crich

St Mary's Church, Crich is a Grade I listed parish church in the Church of England in Crich, Derbyshire.

== History ==
The church, formerly dedicated to St Michael, dates from 1135 and has additions in the 13th, 14th and 15th centuries, with a vestry added in the 20th century. The church was restored in 1861 by Benjamin Ferrey and in 1913 by Currey and Thompson.

The church was hit by lightning on 5 February 1945, which caused a fire to start. It was extinguished by local volunteers armed with stirrup pumps.

The church is in a joint parish with All Saints' Church, South Wingfield.

== Monuments ==
- Sir William de Wakebridge (c. 1369)
- Godfrey Beresford (d. 1513)
- John Clay (d. 1633)
- German Pole (d. 1588)
- German Wheatcroft (d. 1857)

== Organ ==
The church had a pipe organ by William Hill and Son dating from 1913. A specification of the organ can be found on the National Pipe Organ Register. In 2012 it was up for sale.

== See also ==
- Grade I listed churches in Derbyshire
- Grade I listed buildings in Derbyshire
- Listed buildings in Crich
