= St Luke's Church, Heage =

St Luke’s Church, Heage
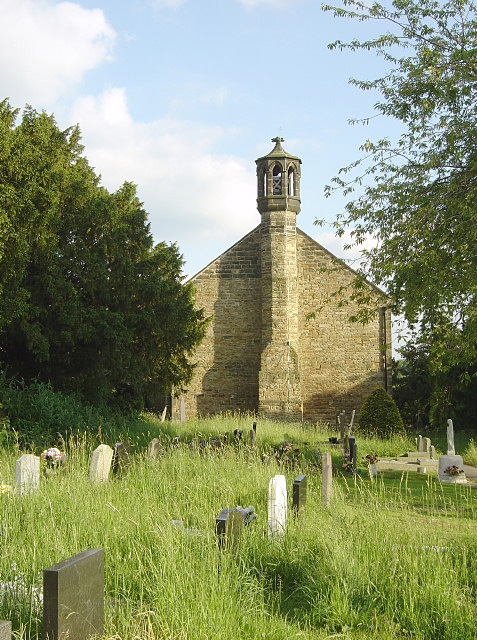
- St Luke’s Church, Heage

- Location within Derbyshire
- 53°03′06″N 1°27′0″W
- Location: Heage, Derbyshire
- Country: England
- Denomination: Church of England
- Website: stlukesheage.webs.com

History
- Dedication: St Luke the Evangelist

Architecture
- Heritage designation: Grade II* listed

Administration
- Province: Canterbury
- Diocese: Derby
- Archdeaconry: Derby
- Deanery: Dove and Derwent
- Parish: Heage

St Luke's Church, Heage is a Grade II* listed parish church in the Church of England in Heage, Derbyshire.

== History ==
There was a church in existence by 1343 as Nicholas of High Edge (Heage) is recorded as the first priest. The medieval church was nearly all destroyed in a storm on 20 June 1545 O.S. The church was rebuilt between 1646 and 1661 incorporating the old east window.

The church was expanded in 1826 and in 1847 the church floor was relaid and a heating system was installed. At the same time as these improvements, the churchyard was consecrated by the Bishop of Lichfield on 9 June 1847 for burials. Further restorations took place in 1856. The east window had stained glass installed. The previous heating apparatus was found to be ineffective and was replaced with a hot water system. A new inner porch was added to the door and the vestry was enlarged. Another restoration was needed by 1897. The church was closed for 1 year and 9 months because of a lack of agreement on the position of the altar and communion rails. The dispute ended up in the Consistory Court. In the end, they remained in their original location.

A lych-gate was added in 1891 to the designs of Maurice Hunter of Belper. In 1906 a new east window was added in memory of Margaret Alton, wife of Francis Cook Alton R.N. It consists of three lights, from left to right, the Blessed Virgin, the Crucifixion and St John the Evangelist. It was designed by Jones and Willis of Birmingham.

in 1933-4 a vestry was added at a cost of £450 to the west side designed by S.F. Walker of Ripley. At the same time a stained-glass window in memory of Frederick Alton was installed.

== Parish status ==
The church is in a joint parish with St Anne's Church, Ambergate.

== Organ ==
The first organ was obtained in 1853 second hand from St Peter's Church, Belper. This was replaced by an organ built by W.M. Hedgeland which was opened by Frederick Bentley, organist of St Andrew's Church, Derby on 22 July 1877. A specification of the organ can be found on the National Pipe Organ Register.

== See also ==
- Grade II* listed buildings in Amber Valley
- Listed buildings in Ripley, Derbyshire
