= Heage Windmill =

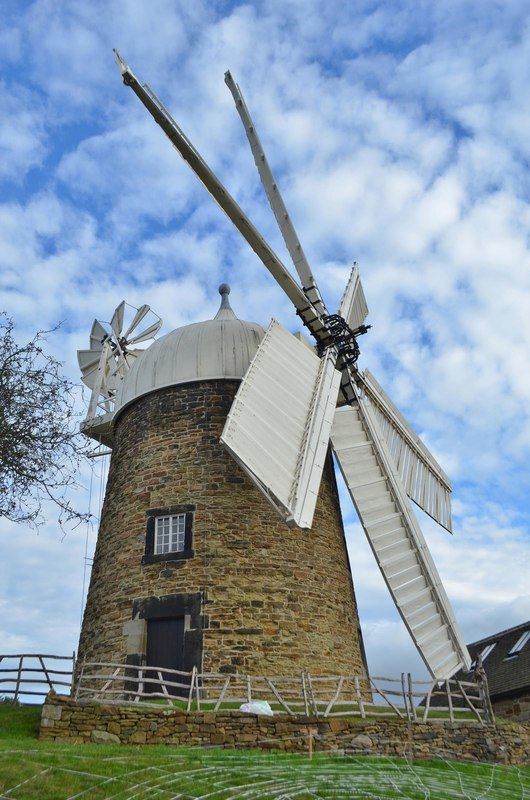

- Location within Derbyshire

General information
- Status: Grade II* listed
- Type: Windmill
- Location: Heage, Derbyshire
- Coordinates: 53°03′11.16″N 1°27′14.62″W
- Ordnance Survey: SK3669150783
- Completed: 1797

Website
- www.heagewindmill.org.uk

Heage Windmill, in Heage, Derbyshire, is a restored windmill, built in the 1790s. After standing unused since 1919, it was restored to working order in 2002. The mill is a Grade II* listed building;

== History ==
It is a tower mill, built in the 1790s and working by 1798. It had four common sails. It was purchased in 1850 by brothers Thomas and Isaac Shore, who modified the mill, replacing the sails with four patent sails, and fitting a fantail. It was damaged in a storm in February 1894, when the cap and sails were blown off; the repaired windmill had six patent sails and an ogee cap.

The mill was in use until 1919, when the miller was Thomas Isaac Shore, grandson of the earlier miller Thomas Shore. In that year the fantail was damaged in a gale, and the mill was closed down. It was sold by the Shores at an auction in 1934, and used by the new owner for storage, eventually becoming derelict. It was given listed status in 1965, as a Grade II* listed building. In 1968 it was purchased by Derbyshire County Council.

There was restoration in the early 1970s: there were new floors, cap covering, fantail and sails, but the mill was not brought to working order. The first of several Open Days took place in 1989. These made the public more aware of the mill, and in 1996 Heage Windmill Society, a charitable trust, was formed. Full restoration began, funded by grants from various sources. The fully working mill was opened to the public on 1 June 2002.

In August 2015 wet rot was found in the fantail mechanism and sails. Funds were raised to make repairs, which were completed in June 2016.

== Present day ==
The mill is open at weekends and Bank Holiday Mondays from April to October; there are guided tours. Group visits can be booked.

== See also ==
- Listed buildings in Ripley, Derbyshire
- List of windmills in Derbyshire
