= Heage =

Village with restored windmill in Derbyshire

Coordinates: 53.050°N 1.447°W

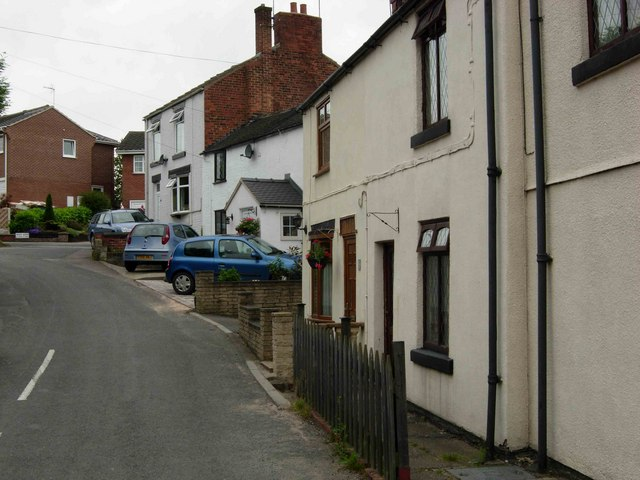
- Baker's Hill

- Location within Derbyshire
- Population: 5,013 (Heage and Ambergate Ward of Ripley Town Council)
- OS grid reference: SK369505
- Civil parish: Ripley
- District: Amber Valley
- Shire county: Derbyshire
- Region: East Midlands
- Country: England
- Sovereign state: United Kingdom
- Post town: BELPER
- Postcode district: DE56
- Dialling code: 01773
- Police: Derbyshire
- Fire: Derbyshire
- Ambulance: East Midlands
- UK Parliament: Amber Valley

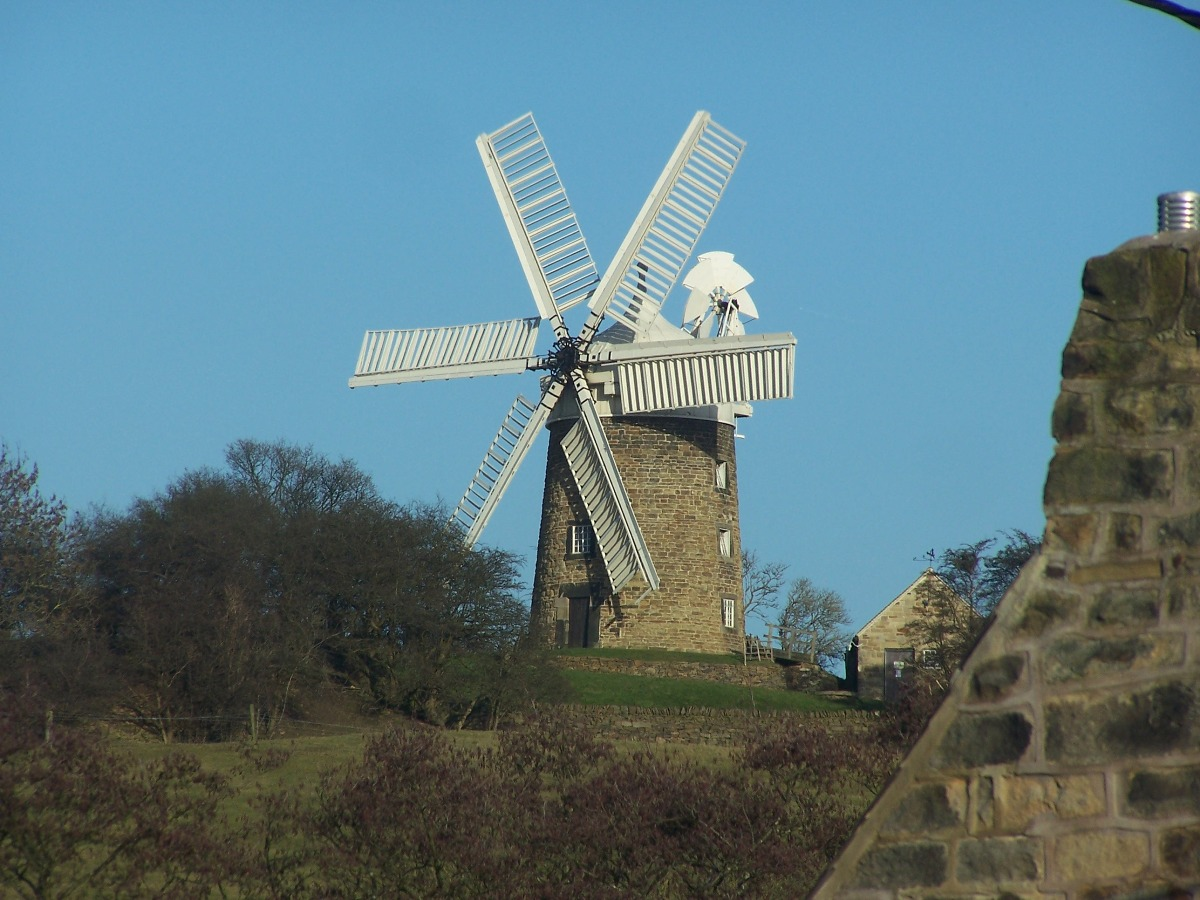
Heage Windmill

Heage is a village and former civil parish, now in the parish of Ripley, in the Amber Valley district, in the county of Derbyshire, England. It is situated midway between Belper and Ripley. The village is in the Heage and Ambergate ward, which in the 2011 census had a population of 5,013.

Heage is known for its six-sailed windmill; building work started in 1791 and it was first recorded as working in 1797. Each of the six sails weighs nearly one ton, and the tower is built from local sandstone.

The name Heage is derived from the Old English hēah and ecg, and means 'high edge' or 'high ridge'. In 1817, the Lysons recorded that "Heage, alias High-edge, lies about five miles from Duffield, upon the road from Chesterfield to Derby. The manor, which had been parcel of the Earldom and Duchy of Lancaster, was granted, with Duffield, to Ditchfield and others. In 1629 it was conveyed to the Stanhope family. Sir William Stanhope bequeathed it, in 1703, to Godfrey Wentworth, Esq. his nephew, whose son of the same name sold it, in 1767, to Francis Hurt, Esq., grandfather of Francis Hurt, Esq., of Alderwasley, who is the present proprietor."

Also located in Heage, at Morley Park, are the remains of two coke-fired blast furnaces for the smelting of iron, built for Francis Hurt of Alderwasley. The first, built in 1780 was the earliest in Derbyshire. The other was built in 1818 and they represent very early coke-fired blast furnaces. They closed in 1874, and most of the site has returned to nature, but the furnace towers still exist and can be seen next to the A38.

The present school was built about 1862 to replace two much smaller schools that were managed by the Church and the Storer Charity. Later it became a secondary school and is now an infants and primary school. The original old Victorian buildings still form part of the school and the old Church school and Charity school are located nearby. When the school was a secondary school it received pupils from three other schools, The Green school (now demolished), Ridgeway school, which has been converted to a house and Ambergate school that is still an infants and junior school. There are a number of recent housing developments in the village.

Heage has two bus services, the 6.2 and 6.3, both of which are operated by TrentBarton. Service 6E operates Monday to Saturday evenings (not Bank Holidays). The services link the village to the nearby towns of Ripley and Belper, as well as the City of Derby.

The first mention of a post office in Heage was in 1847, closed in 2008. It has three pubs, the Eagle Tavern, the Green man and the Black Boy Inn.

Heage is also home to St. Luke's Church, situated on Church Street. It was originally built in 1646. In 1836 the church was enlarged, this created an unusual 'T' shape which is a rarity in Derbyshire. Services are held every Sunday, varying in traditional and contemporary styles.

== Civil parish ==
The village was previously a parish area containing several communities. Immediately surrounding the core village were: Bakershillock (by Bakers Hill), Cackleton Green (by Parkside and Brook St), Nether Heage, Schoolhouse Hill (by New Road). Upper Hartshay was within the village boundaries but outside the parish. Further afield within the parish were: Ambergate, Black-Horse, Boothgate, Bullbridge, Buckland Hollow, Ridgeway, Sawmills, and Toadmoor,

Heage was formerly a chapelry in the parish of Duffield, from 1866 Heage was a civil parish in its own right, on 1 April 1974 the parish was abolished and merged with Belper. In 1951 the parish had a population of 4433.

== See also ==
- Listed buildings in Ripley, Derbyshire
