= All Saints' Church, South Wingfield =

All Saints’ Church, South Wingfield
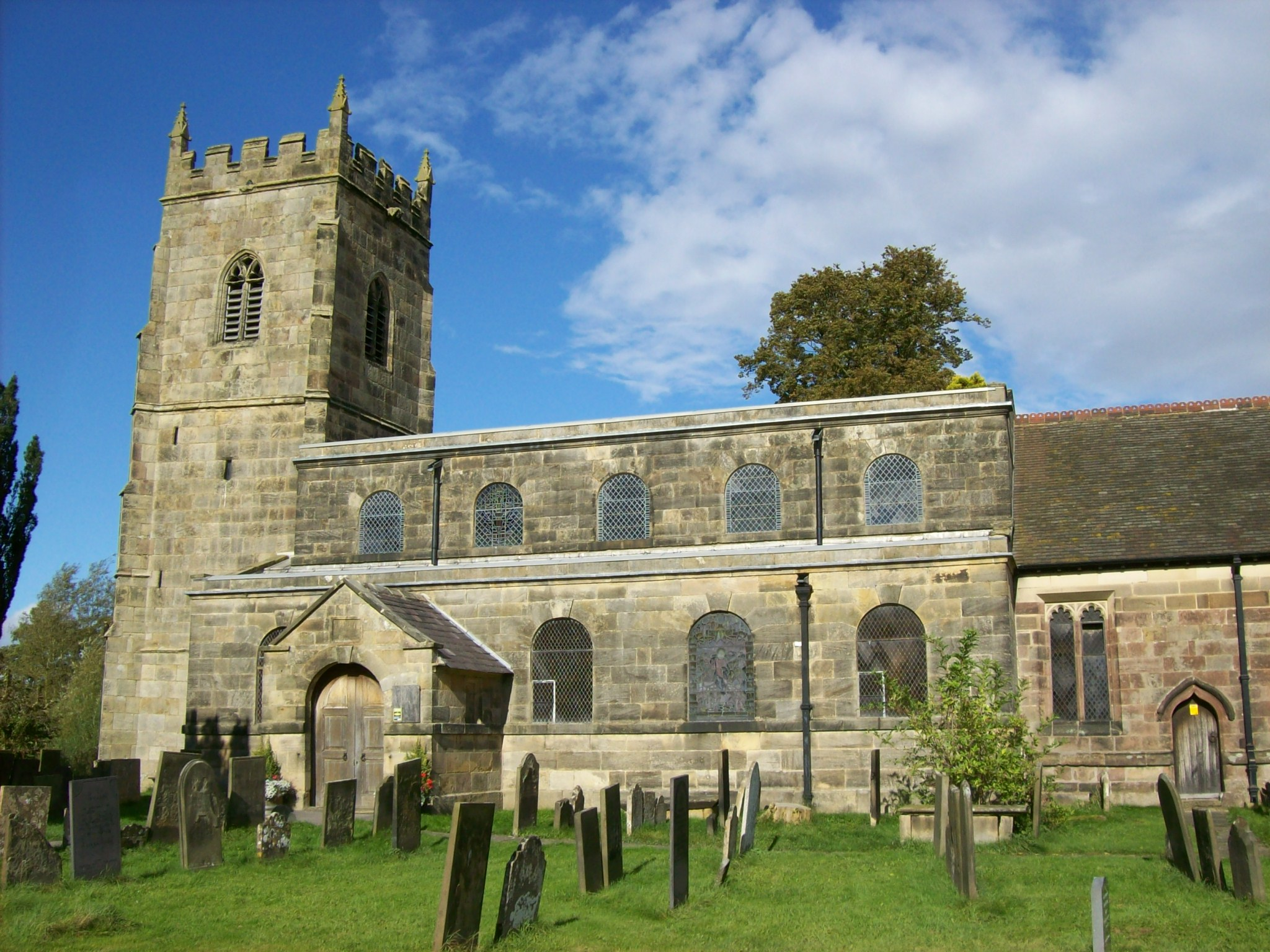
- All Saints’ Church, South Wingfield
- All Saints’ Church, South Wingfield
- 53°5′51.94″N 1°25′43.41″W
- Location: South Wingfield
- Country: England
- Denomination: Church of England
- Website: crichstmarys.org.uk/all-saints/

History
- Dedication: All Saints

Architecture
- Heritage designation: Grade II* listed

Administration
- Diocese: Diocese of Derby
- Archdeaconry: Chesterfield
- Deanery: Alfreton
- Parish: South Wingfield

All Saints’ Church, South Wingfield is a Grade II* listed parish church in the Church of England in South Wingfield, Derbyshire.

== History ==
The church dates from the 12th century. The aisle and nave windows were redone in 1803, over the entrance to the porch are inscribed the initials – “T.R: H.B. Churchwardens 1803”.

The chancel of the church was restored by the Duke of Devonshire in 1877. The main body of the church was restored in 1885. New flooring was installed in place of the square pews. New seating arranged in two blocks was installed. The contractors removed the west end gallery and the seats at the west end were raised. The pulpit, lectern and reading desk were newly constructed of old oak beams and panels. A new heating apparatus by J. Oakes and Co, Riddings, was installed. The expense of alterations came to £450 (equivalent to £50,000 in 2025).

The font dates from the 12th century. Some stained glass windows in the clerestory are by John Hayward.

The church is in a joint parish with St Mary's Church, Crich.

== Organ ==
A new organ by Abbott and Smith of Leeds was installed in 1891 at a cost of 265 guineas (equivalent to £30,500 in 2025). This organ was destroyed by fire in the 1922. It took the parish over 10 years to raise the funds for a replacement, but in February 1933 a new instrument was installed by E. Wragg & Son of Nottingham. In 1991 this was replaced by an electronic instrument, which in 2023 was damaged by flooding.

== Bells ==
The tower contains a ring of 6 bells with a tenor weight of 990 pounds (450 kg). The 2nd, 4th and 5th all date from 1693 by William Noone. The 3rd dates from 1731 by Immanuel Halton and the tenor dates from 1736 by John Halton. The treble is by John Taylor and Co from 1902.

== Monuments ==
- Immanuel Halton (d. 1699)
- William Harris (d. 1631)
- Revd. Miles Halton (d. 1792)
- Immanuel Halton (d. 1784)
