= Oakerthorpe =

Coordinates: 53.09°N 01.4199°W

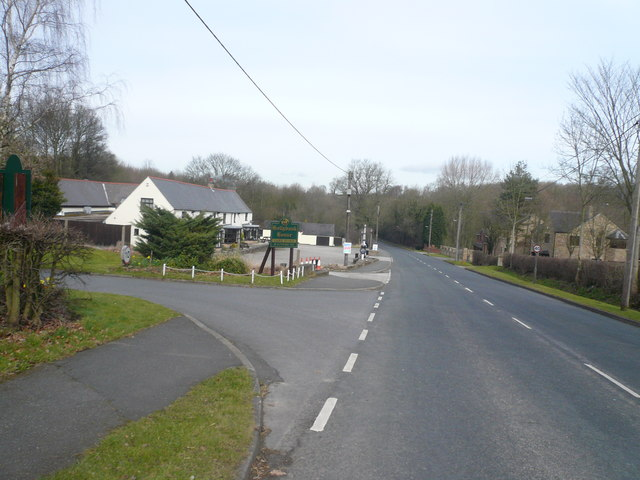
- The Anchor pub

- Location within Derbyshire
- OS grid reference: SK3854
- District: Amber Valley
- Shire county: Derbyshire
- Region: East Midlands
- Country: England
- Sovereign state: United Kingdom
- Police: Derbyshire
- Fire: Derbyshire
- Ambulance: East Midlands

Oakerthorpe is a village in Derbyshire, England.

== History ==
Oakerthorpe is a small village near Alfreton. It was known in medieval times as Ulkerthorpe. It lies in the parish of South Wingfield, eleven miles south of Chesterfield in the county of Derbyshire. The local church is dedicated to All Saints, and is found about half a mile from the village. In the centre of the village is the Peacock Inn; there is also the Anchor pub and the Butchers Arm. Recently houses have been built at 'Hillside Park'.

Oakerthorpe was until recently a mining village.

In the nineteenth century, within Oakerthorpe and near the Peacock Inn lay the ruins of Ufton Manor. In the middle of the sixteenth century the chapel of Limbury adjoined the old manor house. Some ruins of the chapel could still be seen as late as 1800.

The Peacock Inn, situated near the Alfreton-South Wingfield crossroads, dates back into the eleventh century and is reputed to be the oldest inn in the county of Derbyshire. The inn is mentioned in the Domesday Book, when it was known as Ufton Barnsand. It was rebuilt in 1613 and has a most interesting history; legend has it that Dick Turpin, one of the most famous highwaymen in English history, stopped off at the inn on his ride to York.

Another legend associated with the Peacock tells that in the eighteenth century, a respected churchwarden at the chapel and the landlord of the Peacock Inn was Peter Kendall. He had a beautiful daughter named Ann, who wore such fashionable wide hooped dresses that she had to enter the church doorway sideways. The local church, which figures quite largely in the following tale, is called South Wingfield, although it is on the Oakerthorpe side of the River Amber.

Ann Kendall was courted by a young local farmer, who seems to have remained anonymous in the records. The farmer seduced Ann and she fell pregnant. The farmer then deserted Ann and left her to give birth to a daughter. The disgrace so weighed upon poor Miss Kendall's mind that she died on fourteenth of May 1745 of a broken heart. Just before she died she asked for Psalm 109 to be read at her funeral. Since that time, at churches within the district Psalm 109 is known as “Miss Kendall’s Psalm.” Shortly after the funeral, the man who had betrayed the maid was riding past South Wingfield church; suddenly the bells crashed out, the horse reared, and the rider was thrown to the ground, breaking his neck.

It was an old custom in several Derbyshire churches to carry a special garland at the funeral procession of a young man or maiden. These garlands were made of wooden hoops decorated with rosettes, ornaments of white paper and ribbons, and sometimes a pair of white gloves. They were hung up in the church after the funeral, many lingering for centuries. Such a garland was carried at Ann Kendall's funeral and was still hanging in South Wingfield in the 1870s, in spite of previous offers to purchase the curio.

== See also ==
- Listed buildings in South Wingfield
