= Ashley Hay =

Ashley Hay may refer to:

- Ashley Hay (footballer) (born 2003), English footballer
- Ashley Hay (writer) (born 1971), Australian writer
- Ashleyhay, a village in England
