= Alderwasley Hall Sixth Form Centre =

Alderwasley Hall Sixth Form
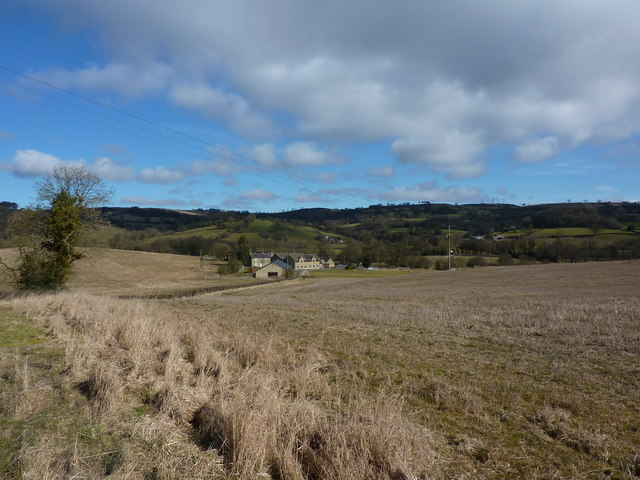

Location
- Alderwasley, Derbyshire, DE4 4BN; United Kingdom; 53.06°N 1.57°W

Information
- Established: 1993 (As Callow Park College)
- Specialist: autism spectrum disorder, speech and language difficulties
- Headteacher: Sara Forsyth
- Gender: Coeducational
- Age: 16 to 19
- Website: http://www.alderwasleyhall.com/

Alderwasley Hall Sixth Form is an independent special needs Sixth Form Centre located one mile south of Wirksworth in Derbyshire it is part of Alderwasley Hall School, previously a country club named Callow Park after the nearby village of Callow which is about a mile, the site was re-branded to its current name in 2012. The Ecclesbourne Valley Railway runs next to the site.

== Country Club ==
Alderwasley Hall Sixth Form was previously a county club called Callow Park with several Squash courts, a small swimming pool, 2 outdoor tennis courts and rooms for visitors to stay the night

== Use as a School ==
In 1993 the site closed and became part of Alderwasley Hall School and was converted into a school. Alderwasley Hall Sixth Form Centre is for students aged sixteen to nineteen and for younger students when studying for Art and PE. Many of these students also attend nearby colleges such as Ilkeston and Buxton on a part-time basis. Some of the students live at the site while many day students attend from nearby areas. Despite being an independent school the majority of funding comes from local authorities (LA).

It is owned by the SENAD Group based in Derby who run other schools for children and young people with learning difficulties.

The site changed its name on September 1, 2012, to Alderwasley Hall Sixth Form Centre.

=== Specialisms ===
Alderwasley Hall Sixth Form Centre is primarily for Asperger's syndrome and speech and language difficulties, but does take students with autism spectrum disorder, dyslexia, specific learning difficulties, social emotional and behavioural difficulties, delicate/medical Conditions, epilepsy and dual/multi-sensory impairment.
