= All Saints' Church, Alderwasley =

All Saints’ Church, Alderwasley
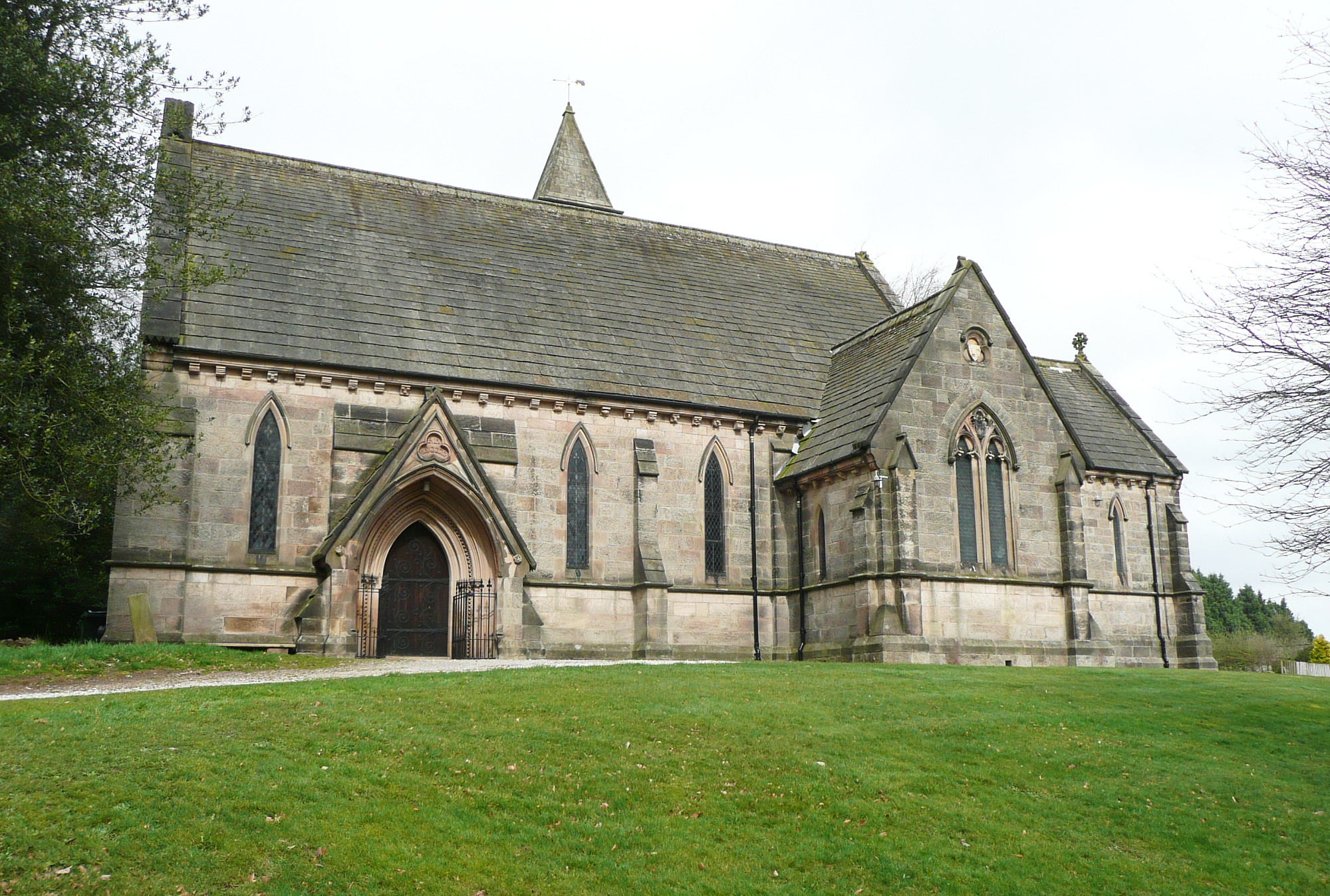
- All Saints’ Church, Alderwasley
- All Saints’ Church, Alderwasley
- 53°4′30.6″N 1°30′55.6″W
- OS grid reference: SK 32557 53213
- Location: Alderwasley, Derbyshire
- Country: England
- Denomination: Church of England

History
- Dedication: All Saints

Architecture
- Heritage designation: Grade II listed
- Architect: Henry Isaac Stevens
- Completed: 27 September 1849

Administration
- Province: Canterbury
- Diocese: Derby
- Archdeaconry: Chesterfield
- Deanery: Wirksworth
- Parish: Alderwasley

All Saints’ Church, Alderwasley, is a Grade II listed parish church in the Church of England in Alderwasley, Derbyshire.

== History ==
The church replaced the ancient chapel of St Margaret in the village. It was built by A.F. Hurt of Alderwasley Hall and placed near the hall for the convenience of the family. The church was opened on 27 September 1849.

== Parish status ==
The church is in a joint parish with

- St James the Apostle's Church, Bonsall
- All Saints' Church, Bradbourne
- All Saints’ Church, Ballidon
- St James’ Church, Brassington
- St Margaret's Church, Carsington
- All Saints’ Church, Elton
- St James’ Church, Idridgehay
- Holy Trinity Church, Kirk Ireton
- Holy Trinity Church, Middleton-by-Wirksworth
- St Mary's Church, Wirksworth

== Organ ==
The organ was installed in 1880 and was built by Brindley & Foster. A specification of the organ can be found on the National Pipe Organ Register.

== See also ==
- Listed buildings in Alderwasley
