= Alderwasley Hall School =

Private special school in Derbyshire, England

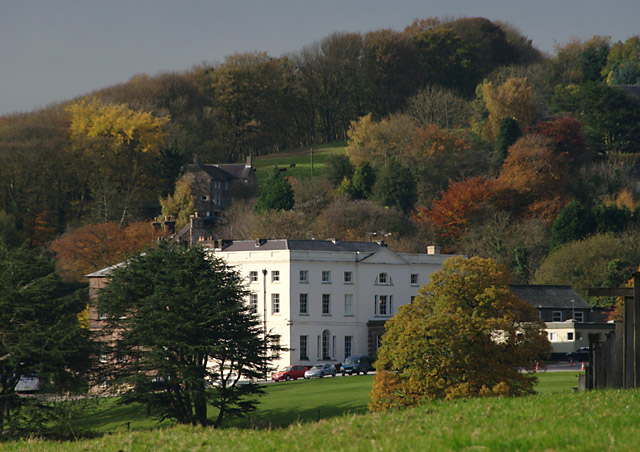

Location
- Alderwasley Hall School; Alderwasley, Belper, Derbyshire, DE56 2SR; England; 53.076°N 01.514°W

Information
- Type: Private special school
- Established: 1930; 96 years ago 1976; 50 years ago (Special School)
- Department for Education URN: 113021 Tables
- Ofsted: Reports
- Gender: Coeducational
- Age: 5 to 20
- Colours: Pink, Blue (Unofficial)
- Sixth form: Alderwasley Hall Sixth Form Centre
- Website: http://www.alderwasleyhall.com/

Alderwasley Hall School is a private residential special school. The school is for children and young people aged 5 to 20 with high-functioning autism spectrum disorder, Asperger syndrome, pathological demand avoidance, and developmental language disorder. It is in and named after the village of Alderwasley in the Peak District, close to Wirksworth in Derbyshire, England.

== History ==
The earliest owners of the land were the Le Fownes in the thirteenth century. No description remains of the original house except the chapel of St Margaret which was rebuilt in the sixteenth century. The Lowes owned the estate during the fifteenth century and the house at this time most likely took an 'H' formation. Nicholas Hurt of Casterne inherited the estate in 1690 when he married Elizabeth Lowe and the estate was transformed. An iron forge was established nearby at Shining Cliff Woods in 1764 and the house was extended in ashlar Millstone Grit sandstone. An eighteenth century deercote is a significant feature of the park and recently restored from ruin. By 1880 the estate was around 3,500 acres with 200 acres of walled deer park. The estate was inherited by Hurt's son, also Francis Hurt who was also High Sheriff.

The Hurts were responsible for building two other country homes on the estate, being Chase Cliffe and Oakhurst House. The estate was broken up in 1920 and the Hurts sold the house in 1930 when they moved to Casterne Hall, Staffordshire. The house was sold to a Benedictine Order to be used as a school. In 1976 it became a Special School. The house was made a Grade II listed building in 1967.

== Use as a school ==
The school is primarily a term-time residential school, but takes day pupils primarily from Derbyshire, Leicestershire, Nottinghamshire and Staffordshire. It also has an onsite Children's Home for some pupils to live 52 weeks a year at the school. Despite being an independent school, the majority of funding comes from local education authorities (LAs).

The school has extensive grounds, which include a series of ponds, which are home to ducks and geese. The parish church of All Saints lies close to the entrance of the school grounds.

The Headteacher is Sara Forsyth. It is owned by the SENAD Group based in Derby who run other schools for children and young people with learning difficulties.

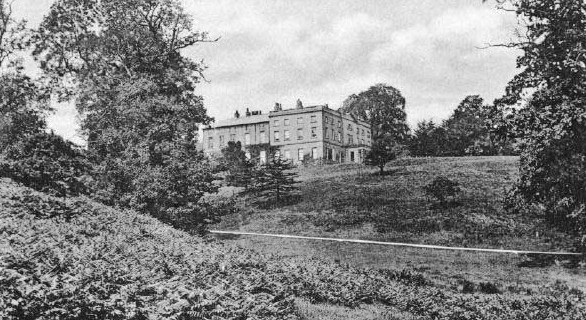
Alderwasley Hall in about 1905

2017/18 was a second successive record breaking year for Student GCSE results for the school. There was further national uncertainty in GCSE results this year due to the implementation of GCSE reforms, including a new grading system for many GCSEs. Students this year, were graded on a 9-1 scale (9 being the highest) for reformed GCSEs, whilst retaining the A*-G scale (A* being the highest) for all other GCSEs. Of the 34 GCSEs taken by 19 young people in 11 different subjects every single one was passed and 74% of them were awarded a grade 4+/C+.

In July 2018, the School was graded Good, with outstanding features by Ofsted Inspectors.

=== Alderwasley Hall Sixth Form Centre ===
The Sixth Form Centre Alderwasley Hall Sixth Form Centre, is based 1 mile (2 km) south of Wirksworth. It is also used by the students from Alderwasley for Sport and Art.

=== Specialisms ===
Alderwasley Hall School and Sixth Form Centre are situated in picturesque Derbyshire, close to the towns of Matlock, Belper and Wirksworth. The school provides specialist education, therapy and care for children and young people aged 5 – 20 years, with speech, language and communication needs and/or Asperger syndrome and/or acquired brain injury.

== See also ==
- Listed buildings in Alderwasley
