= Rock-a-bye Baby =

English nursery rhyme and lullaby

Rock-a-bye Baby / Hush-a-bye Baby
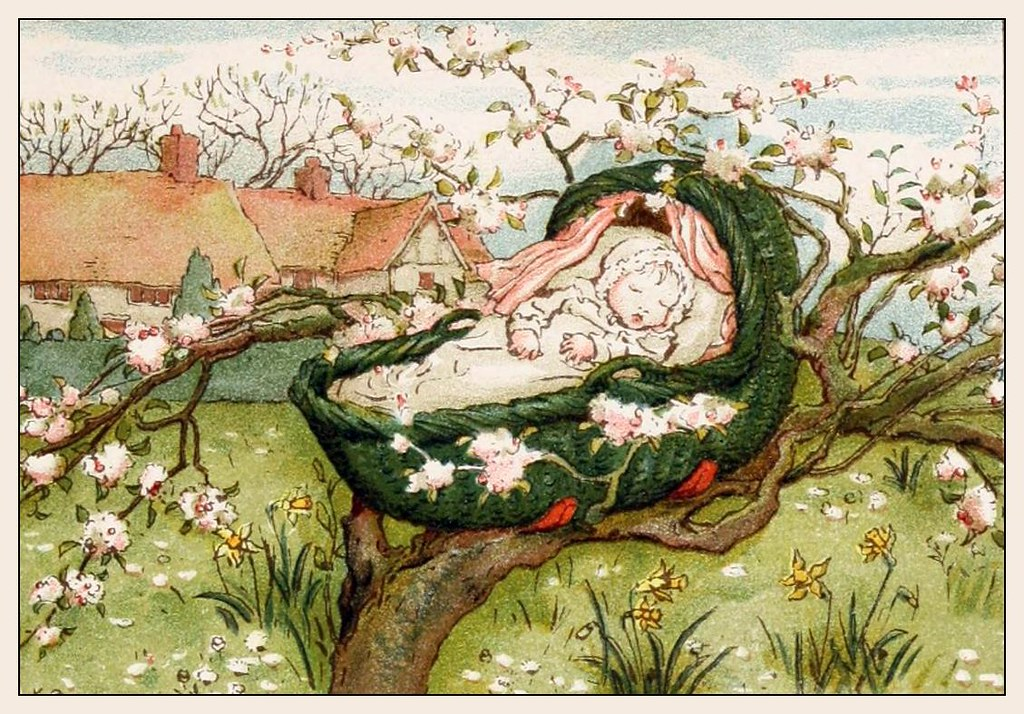
- Illustration by Kate Greenaway, 1900
- Publication date: c. 1765

"Rock-a-bye baby on the tree top" (sometimes "Hush-a-bye baby on the tree top") is a nursery rhyme and lullaby. It has a Roud Folk Song Index number of 2768.

== Words ==
The rhyme exists in several versions. One modern example, quoted by the National Literacy Trust, has these words:

Rock a bye baby on the tree top,
When the wind blows the cradle will rock,
When the bough breaks the cradle will fall,
And down will come baby, cradle and all.

The rhyme is believed to have first appeared in print in Mother Goose's Melody (London c. 1765), possibly published by John Newbery, and which was reprinted in Boston in 1785. No copies of the first edition are extant, but a 1791 edition substitutes "Hush-a-by baby" at the start of the first line. The rhyme is followed by a note: "This may serve as a warning to the proud and ambitious, who climb so high that they generally fall at last."

James Orchard Halliwell, in his The Nursery Rhymes of England (1842), notes that the third line read "When the wind ceases the cradle will fall" in the earlier Gammer Gurton's Garland (1784) and himself records "When the bough bends" in the second line and "Down will come baby, bough, cradle and all" as the fourth.

== Origin ==
The scholars Iona and Peter Opie note that the age of the words is uncertain, and that "imaginations have been stretched to give the rhyme significance". They list a variety of claims that have been made, without endorsing any of them:

- that the baby represents the Egyptian deity Horus
- that the first line is a corruption of the French "He bas! là le loup!" (Hush! There's the wolf!)
- that it was written by an English Mayflower colonist who observed the way Native American women rocked their babies in birch bark cradles, suspended from the branches of trees
- that it lampoons the British royal line in the time of James II.

In Derbyshire, England, one local legend has it that the song relates to a local character in the late 18th century, Betty Kenny (Kate Kenyon), who lived in a huge yew tree in Shining Cliff Woods in the Derwent Valley, where a hollowed-out bough served as a cradle.

Another speculation was that the words "may simply have been suggested by the swaying and soothing motion of the topmost branches of the trees, although…another authority is that Rock-a-bye baby and Bye baby bunting come to us from the Indians, as they had a custom of cradling their pappooses among the swaying branches."

== Tunes and variations ==
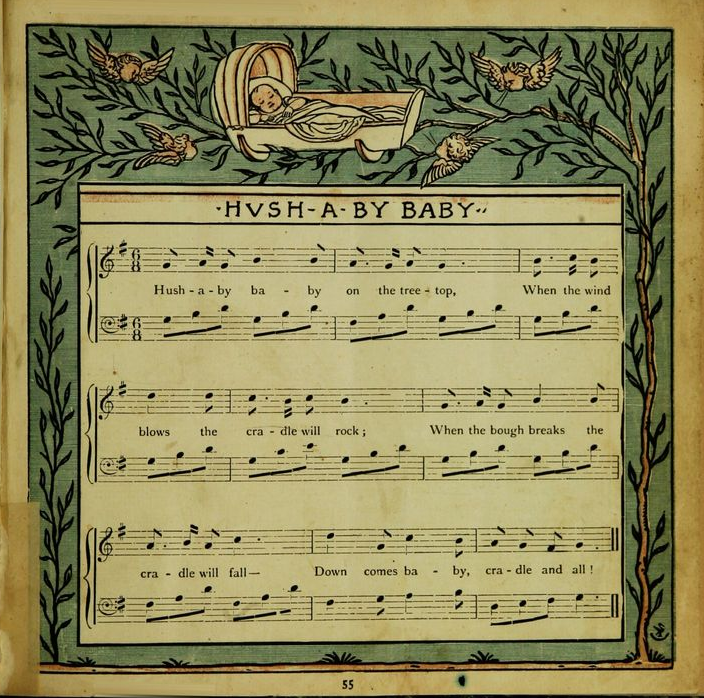
"Hush-a-bye baby" in The Baby's Opera, A book of old Rhymes and The Music by the Earliest Masters, ca. 1877

The rhyme is generally sung to one of two tunes. The only one mentioned by the Opies in The Oxford Book of Nursery Rhymes (1951) is a variant of Henry Purcell's 1686 quickstep Lillibullero, but others were once popular in North America.

An 1887 editorial in Boston's The Musical Herald mentions "Rock-a-bye-baby" as being part of the street band repertoire, while in that same year The Times carried an advertisement for a performance in London by the Moore and Burgess Minstrels, featuring among others "the great American song of ROCK-A-BYE". Newspapers of the period credited the tune to two separate persons, both resident in Boston. One was Effie Crockett, who in 1872 wrote an original composition using the lullaby as a returning refrain after each of its three verses. This, however, was not published until "probably 1884" under the pseudonym Effie I. Canning. The other candidate was Charles Dupee Blake (1847-1903), a prolific composer of popular music, of which "his best known work is Rock-a-Bye Baby".

It is difficult to say which one of the many contemporary songs bearing that title and of varied authorship was really the subject of the news reports. The one reproduced under that title in Clara L. Mateaux's Through Picture Land (1876) is a two-stanza work that is different in wording and form. Another in St Nicholas Magazine for 1881 and ascribed to M. E. Wilkins begins with the words of the traditional lullaby, which are then followed by fourteen stanzas of more varied form. Still another appears in the Franklin Square Song Collection for 1885 under the title "American Cradle Song" in a version by Robert Jones Burdette. More lullabies followed in much the same format, including variations on the completely separate song "Rock-a-bye, baby, thy cradle is green" (Opie #23), and a transformation into Rock-a-Bye Your Baby with a Dixie Melody from the musical Sinbad of 1918.

== Sculpture ==
In 1874, the sculptor Jules Dalou exhibited a terracotta statuette titled "Hush-a-bye Baby" at that year's Royal Academy exhibition. This portrayed a singing mother cradling her baby and seated in a rocking chair, with the rhyme’s first two lines quoted on the base. A commission followed in 1875 to carve the composition in marble.

== See also ==
- Rock-a-Bye Your Baby with a Dixie Melody
- Rockabye (song) – 2016 single by Clean Bandit
