= Listed buildings in Alderwasley =

Alderwasley is a civil parish in the Amber Valley district of Derbyshire, England. The parish contains 16 listed buildings that are recorded in the National Heritage List for England. All the listed buildings are designated at Grade II, the lowest of the three grades, which is applied to "buildings of national importance and special interest". The parish contains the village of Alderwasley and the surrounding countryside. The listed buildings consist of houses and associated structures, farmhouses, a country house converted into a school, a church and a former chapel, a public house, a road bridge, a milestone, a former toll house, and a war memorial.

== Buildings ==
Name and location	Photograph	Date	Notes
St Margaret's Chapel; 53.07708°N 1.51803°W		Early 16th century	The chapel was converted into a village hall in 1978–80. It is in gritstone, and has a stone slate roof with moulded gable copings and moulded kneelers. On the front are two-light mullioned windows, and to their east is a blocked doorway with a quoined and chamfered surround, a four-centred arched lintel, and a hood mould. At the west end is a doorway with a shouldered surround, a four-centred arched lintel with floral motifs and nail head ornament, and a hood mould. Carved stones are set in the masonry.
Lanehead Farmhouse; 53.07663°N 1.54378°W	—	Late 17th century	The farmhouse is in gritstone with quoins and a tile roof. There are two storeys and a T-shaped plan, consisting of a three-bay range and a rear wing. The central doorway has a quoined surround. In the main range is a sash window, and the other windows are 20th-century casements. The wing contains a Venetian window and a two-light mullioned window.
Chapel Hill Farmhouse; 53.07703°N 1.51972°W	—	Mid 18th century	The farmhouse is in gritstone with quoins and a Welsh slate roof. There are two storeys and three bays. On the front is a gabled porch with decorative bargeboards, and a doorway with a massive surround and lintel. The windows are two-light casements with mullions.
All Saints Church; 53.07520°N 1.51543°W		1849–50	The church is built in gritstone with a slate roof, and is in Early English style. It consists of a nave, a south porch, north and south transepts, a tower in the angle of the north transept, and a chancel. The tower has three stages, buttresses, trefoil-headed louvred bell openings, and a pyramidal cap. Most of the windows are lancets, in the north transept is a wheel window, the south transept contains a two-light window, and the east window is a triple lancet.
The Old Bear Inn; 53.07103°N 1.53268°W		Mid 18th century	The public house is in gritstone with quoins and a tile roof. There are two storeys and attics, and an L-shaped plan, consisting of a main range of three bays, a projecting gabled wing on the left, and single-storey extensions at the rear. The central doorway has a quoined surround and a flat hood on brackets. Above the doorway is a two-stage stair window, and the other windows are casements. The wing has external steps lead to an upper floor doorway.
Gate piers south of Whatstandwell Lodge; 53.08133°N 1.50802°W	—	Mid 18th century	The gate piers are in gritstone, and are square. Each pier has a plain base, above which is V-shaped rustication, a fluted frieze with paterae, a moulded projecting cap with a shallow pyramidal top. Between them are ornamental cast iron gates.
Willetts Farmhouse; 53.07556°N 1.53094°W	—	Mid 18th century	The farmhouse, which incorporates earlier material, is in gritstone, with quoins, and a tile roof with coped gables. There are three storeys, and a symmetrical west front with two bays. The central doorway has a quoined surround, in the ground floor are Venetian windows, and the windows in the upper floors are mullioned with two lights.
Gate piers and gates, Alderwasley Hall; 53.07482°N 1.51607°W	—	Late 18th century	The gate piers are in gritstone, and are square. Each pier has a plain base, above which is V-shaped rustication, a fluted frieze with paterae, a moulded projecting cap. Between them are ornamental cast iron gates.
Pendleton Cottage Farmhouse; 53.07516°N 1.53113°W	—	Late 18th century	The farmhouse is in gritstone with a stone slate roof. There are two storeys and three bays. At each end is a doorway, the windows in the ground floor are mullioned, and in the upper floor they are two-light casements.
Road bridge 53.08552°N 1.50707°W	—	Late 18th century	The bridge carries Derby Road (A6 road) over the River Derwent. It is in gritstone, and consists of two semicircular arches, with three smaller arches in the west abutment wall, and a tail race to the south of the bridge. The bridge has pointed cutwaters, pilasters, bands, and a parapet with ridged coping.
The Old Vicarage; 53.07443°N 1.51620°W		Late 18th century	The house is in red brick with gritstone dressings, quoins, and a tile roof with coped gables and moulded kneelers. There are two storeys and three bays, the outer bays projecting and gabled. In the middle bay is a doorway with a fanlight, over which is a Diocletian window, and a gablet with an inscribed shield tablet. The left bay contains a Venetian window in the ground floor and a Diocletian window above, and in the right bay is a Venetian window in both floors.
St Benets School; 53.07599°N 1.51377°W		1796–1800	A country house, Alderwasley Hall, later a school, in rendered gritstone, with a floor band, a moulded cornice, a parapet, and a roof of slate and lead. There are three storeys and a basement, and a symmetrical front of seven bays, the middle bay projecting under a pediment. In the centre is a porch with four rusticated columns and an entablature, and a doorway with a moulded surround, a pulvinated frieze, and a pediment on scrolled brackets. Above the porch is a tripartite window, and a Diocletian window in the top floor. The second and sixth bays contain a Venetian window in the ground floor, and the other windows are sashes.
Milestone; 53.07004°N 1.52952°W		Late 18th or early 19th century	The milestone on the north side of Wirksworth Road consists of a gritstone slab about 1 metre (3 ft 3 in) high, set into a wall. It is inscribed with the distances to London and Wirksworth.
Toll Bar Cottage; 53.09049°N 1.51515°W		Early 19th century	The former toll house is in gritstone on a plinth, with a slate eaves course, and a tile roof. There is a single storey and two bays. The doorway has a bracketed hood, and the windows are casements with mullions and hood moulds.
Alderwasley Lodge; 53.08524°N 1.50814°W		Mid 19th century	The enlargement of an earlier building, it is in gritstone, and has a roof of stone slate and tile with coped gables. There are two storeys and an L-shaped plan. On the east front is a canted bay window and a two-light mullioned window above. The south front contains an arcaded porch with two semicircular arches divided by a square pillar.
Alderwasley War Memorial; 53.07373°N 1.51420°W		After 1920	The war memorial stands on an isolated site in Alderwasley Park. It is in the form of a granite Celtic cross with a tapering square shaft, set in a cairn of sandstone boulders with a concrete core. On the cross is a raised knotwork design, and on the foot of the shaft is an inscribed granite plaque. There are other granite plaques containing the names of those lost in the two World Wars.
