= Shining Cliff Woods, Derbyshire =

Woodland in Derbyshire, England

Shining Cliff Woods
- Interactive map of Shining Cliff Woods

Geography
- Location: Derbyshire, East Midlands, England
- Coordinates: 53.073°N 1.501°W

Administration
- Governing body: Grith Fyrd Pioneers, National Trust, Forestry England

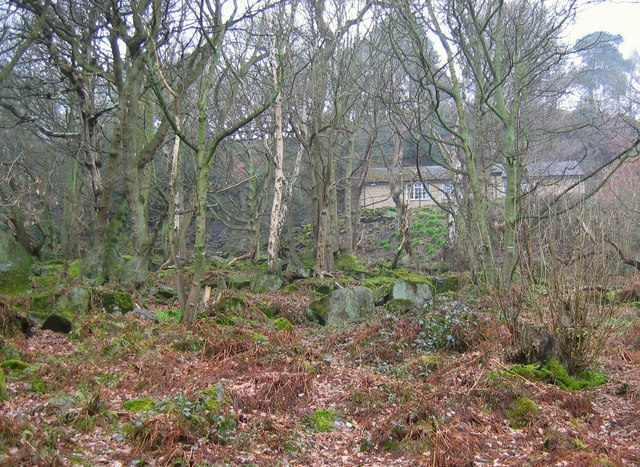
Shining Cliff Hostel. This basic hostel is in the ancient woodland of Shining Cliff Wood.

Shining Cliff Woods are on the west bank of the River Derwent near to Ambergate in Derbyshire, England.

In medieval times "Schymynde-cliffe" was one of the seven royal parks within Duffield Frith and, as such, belonged to Edmund Crouchback, Earl of Lancaster. It was an estate within the manor of Alderwasley and in 1284 was given to William Foun who was given the job of maintaining the boundaries between the Pendleton and Peatpits Brooks.

They passed to Thomas Lowe by marriage in 1471 and in 1514 he was granted by Henry VIII the right to "empark and empale" his estate and enjoy "free warren" within it.

The woods include an SSSI. Some of the woodland is owned and managed by Grith Fyrd Pioneers, but the Eastern part is (like Alport Height some 2 kilometres (1.2 mi) to the west), in the ownership of the National Trust, and part of their South Peak Estate. This woodland is managed by Forestry England.

The woods contain a popular residential centre, once managed by the Youth Hostels Association but managed independently since 2009. The hostel stands in the lee of the Shining Cliff itself, a low gritstone rockface (grid reference SK333523).

To the east of Shining Cliff Wood stands Oakhurst House, a 19th-century Jacobean-Arts and Crafts country home which has fallen into partial ruin. It was built by Francis Hurt, landowner and resident of local Alderwasley Hall. The house is in private ownership and not accessible to the public.

== In popular culture ==
A well-known legend has it that the nursery rhyme Rock-a-bye Baby relates to a local character in the late 18th century, Betty Kenny (Kate Kenyon), who lived in a huge yew tree in Shining Cliff Woods – now known as the "Betty Kenny Tree".

This, and other myths and legends are explored in the Amberwell Pictures film Shining Cliff Woods, directed by Jake Mayo.
