= Effie I. Canning =

American actress (1857–1940)

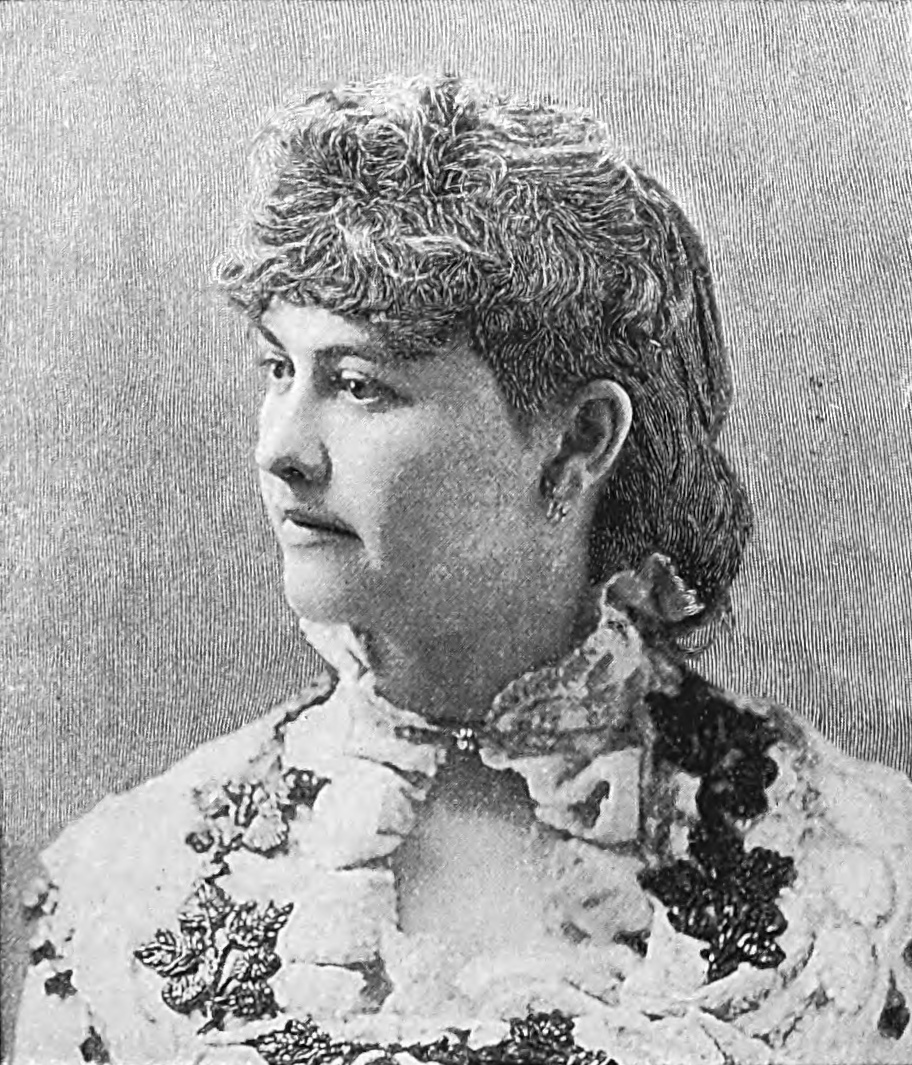
- Born: 1856
- Died: 1940 (aged 83–84)
- Other names: Effie C. Carlton
- Occupations: Stage actress, songwriter

Effie I. Crockett Carlton (March 4, 1856 – January 7, 1940), known as Effie I. Canning, was an American actress and songwriter. She is credited with having written and composed the lullaby "Rock-a-bye Baby"; despite the words being in print in 1765.

== Life ==
Effie Crockett was born 4 March 1856 in Rockland, Maine, and died 7 January 1940 at Boston City Hospital.

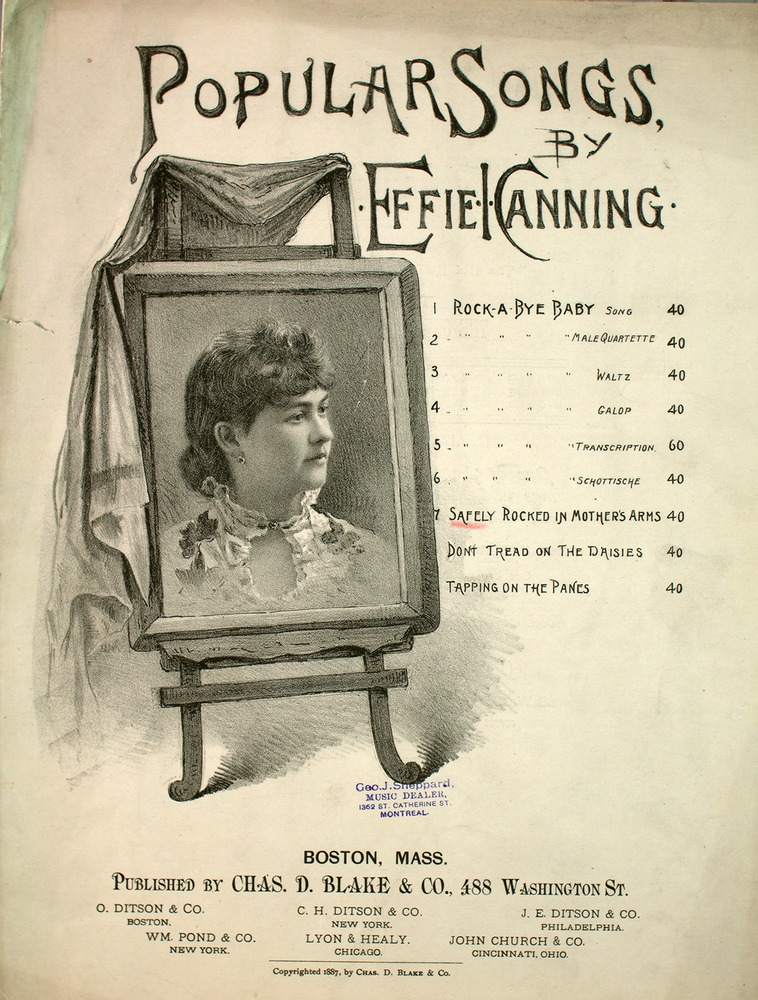
Song sheet by Canning

The words of "Rock-a-bye Baby" first appeared in print in Mother Goose's Melody (London, c. 1765), possibly published by John Newbery (1713–1767), and which was reprinted in Boston in 1785. Rock-a-bye as a phrase was first recorded in 1805 in Benjamin Tabart's Songs for the Nursery, (London, 1805).

By one account she created the song in 1872 while minding someone else's baby. Her tune was spotted by her banjo teacher and he sent her to have it published in Boston. Because of "Rock-a-bye Baby", she is credited in over 100 films, many made decades after her death.

"Rock-a-Bye, Baby" is said to have been composed by Canning in 1886. Her waltz-lullaby has been sung by millions of parents. She says that she used her grandmother's surname of Canning when publishing the work as she was unsure of her father's reaction to her work.

On stage, Canning appeared opposite William Gillette in his adaption of The Private Secretary. She toured in Charles Frohman's production of Oliver Twist, played with Mrs. Leslie Carter's company, and later had her own repertory company.

Effie Canning Carlton and her husband Harry J. Carlton are buried at Mount Feake Cemetery, Massachusetts.
