= Ashleyhay =

Village in Derbyshire, England

Coordinates: 53.062°N 1.566°W

Ashley Hay
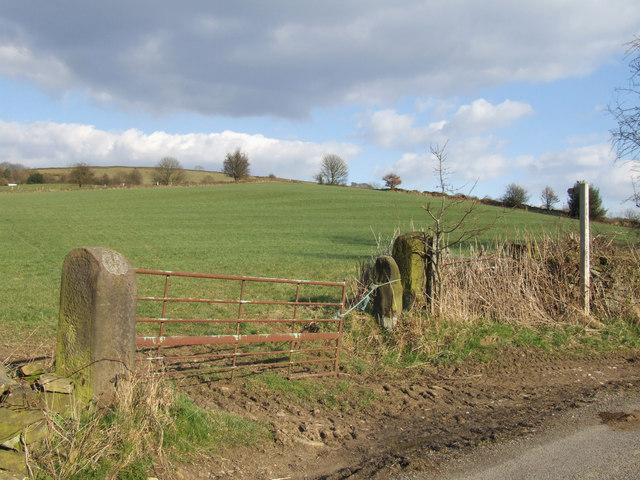
- Ashley Hay, looking towards Spout.

- Ashleyhay parish highlighted within Derbyshire
- Population: 118 (2011)
- OS grid reference: SK291517
- District: Amber Valley
- Shire county: Derbyshire
- Region: East Midlands
- Country: England
- Sovereign state: United Kingdom
- Post town: MATLOCK
- Postcode district: DE4
- Police: Derbyshire
- Fire: Derbyshire
- Ambulance: East Midlands

Ashleyhay (Old English Enclosure at the ash-tree wood or clearing) is a village and civil parish in the Amber Valley district of Derbyshire, England, about five miles north-west of Belper. It is also situated one and three-quarters of a mile south of Wirksworth and eleven miles north of Derby city centre. According to the 2001 census it had a population of 105, increasing to 118 at the 2011 Census.

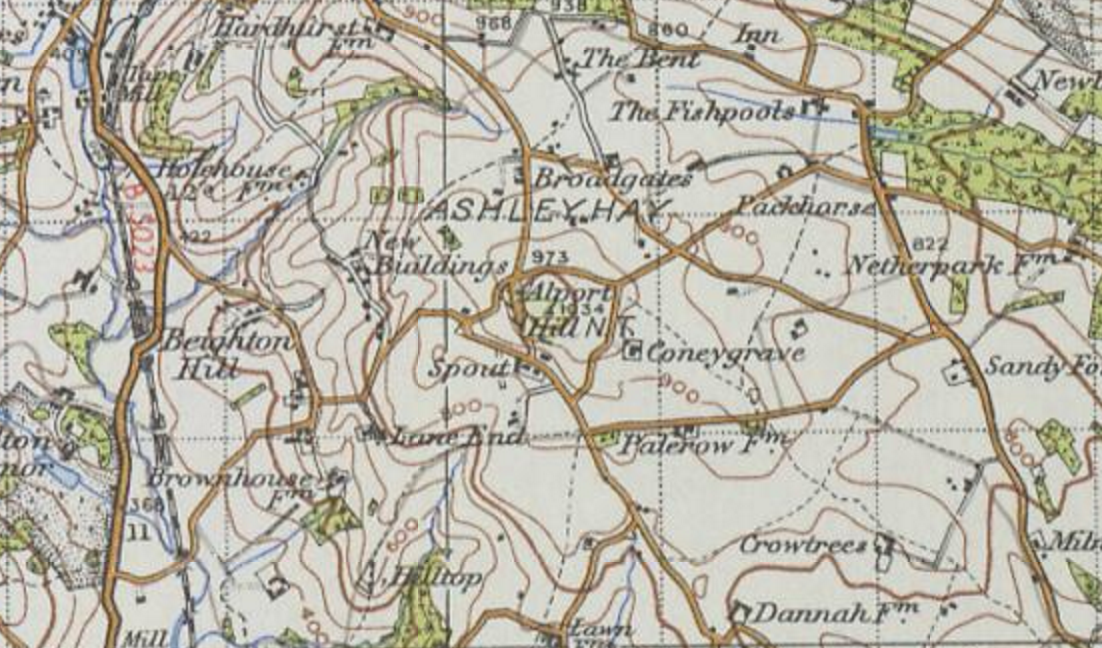
A map from the ordnance survey in the 20th century showing the location of Ashleyhay, Derbyshire

== History ==
In 1870–72 John Marius described Ashleyhay as:

"a township in Wirksworth parish, Derby; 1 mile SE of Wirksworth. Pop., 232. Houses, 49."

According to A Topographical Dictionary of England (Lewis, S 1829) Ashelyhay township was included within Wirksworth Parish.

"There is also a manor within the parish, which has no courts, called the Holland, or Richmond, manor, granted in 1553, by the crown, to Ralph Gell. The parish comprises 14,022a. 3r. 20p., and includes the chapelries of Alderwasley and Cromford; the townships of Ashley-Hay, Biggin, Hopton, Ible, and Idridgehay with Allton; and the hamlets of Callow, Ivonbrook-Grange, and Middleton."

According to the website A Vision of Britain Through Time, Ashleyhay changed from its Township status to Civil Parish level after 1886.

== Demographics ==
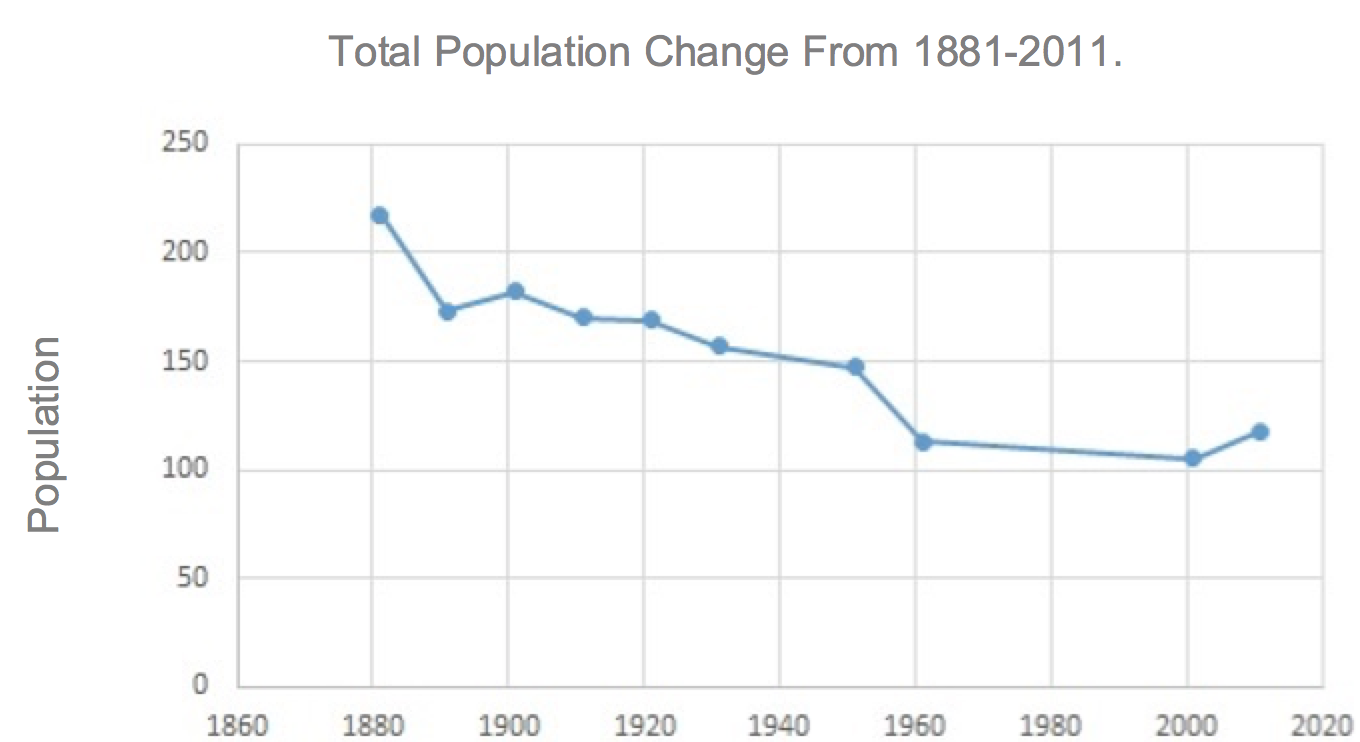
Total Population of Ashleyhay Civil Parish, Derbyshire, as reported by the population census from 1881–2011

=== Population Change ===
The time series illustrates how from 1881 when the population of Ashleyhay was 218, it decreased to 118 by 2011. The graph illustrates that after almost every 10-year interval the population had decreased, this is except for the periods between 1891–1901 and between 2001–2011 when the population increased. Since first being recorded the population of Ashleyhay was at its smallest in 2001 at 105 residence. The overall decrease in population means that the population density (persons per hectare) has dropped to 0.2, this is significantly lower than the average for the Amber Valley area which is 4.6 and the national average of 4.1.

=== Occupations ===
Bar Chart displaying occupational structure of Ashleyhay in 1881.

As the Bar chart shows, in 1881 the vast majority of males (44) in Ashleyhay were employed in Agriculture of some variety. The other four males eligible to work all had different occupations. One a Labourer, one involved in transport, one with an unspecified occupation and one with an unknown occupation. The majority of females (37) in Ashleyhay also had an unknown occupation, and 4 had an unspecified occupation, this doesn't necessarily mean they were unemployed but it is most likely the case especially with females. The only specified occupations that females had in 1881 were in Agriculture in which two females worked and in Domestic services in which six females worked. The key reason for the majority of people working in an agricultural occupation is Ashleyhay's location. It is a very rural parish where the main resource is the land that can be used for farming .

== Land ==
In 1829, The History, Gazetteer and Directory of the County of Derby stated that the village consists of 1400 acres (566 Hectares). However, in 1886 this area was reduced, enlarging the Civil Parish of Alderwasley as the area under ownership of Sandyford Farm was transferred.

== Points of Interest ==
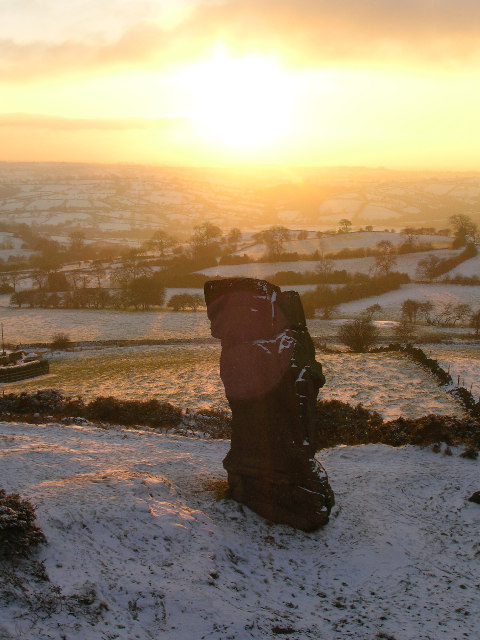
The Alport Stone, stands just below the summit of Alport Height, near Ashleyhay

=== Alport Height ===
On the Southern edge of Ashleyhay's border is a hill called the Alport Height, at its summit this area of high ground is over 300meters above sea level. In 1930 nine acres of land was acquired on the hill by the National Trust, it was the first piece of land they acquired in Derbyshire of scenic nature, it has remained free admission to the site since they acquired it. Visible on the side of the Alport Height hill is an old quarry, explaining the existence of Alport Stone standing at 6meters tall.

=== Ecclesbourne Valley Railway ===
The Ecclesbourne Valley Railway runs through the west side of Ashleyhay on its path from Wirksworth to Duffield. Now a heritage railway mainly for the use of tourists it started off life in 1867 as both a passenger and freight route, the passenger trains were stopped in 1947 and the freight trains ceased operation in 1964, the whole line was closed in 1989. In 2000 a group of volunteers started work clearing the railway of vegetation, by 2002 the railway had reopened it passenger services on parts of the line. The line now is fully operational and is the longest heritage railway in Derbyshire. Train timetables on the line now coincide with the mainline railway service at Duffield meaning it is possible to commute anywhere on the national network from the Eccelsbourne Valley Railway.

== See also ==
- Listed buildings in Ashleyhay
