= Grith Fyrd =

Grith Fyrd was a radical alternative educational movement in England during the 1930s. It created two permanent work camps, one at Godshill in Hampshire and the other at Shining Cliff in Derbyshire, which took in unemployed men and tried to use them as a basis for creating a land-based community.

Grith Fyrd (the name means 'Peace Army' in Old English) was launched after a series of lectures in 1931. Its founders belonged to the Order of Woodcraft Chivalry, an English group influenced by the thinking of Ernest Thompson Seton's Woodcraft Indians (later renamed the Woodcraft League of America), whose most lasting creation was the Woodcraft Folk. The movement's outlook represented a mixture of socialism, co-operativism and anti-urbanism, and was strongly internationalist. The Order's main practical aim was to create an outdoor movement that would allow boys, girls, men and women to work and learn together.

In the early 1930s, the Order launched Grith Fyrd to combat the "three evils of the day: monstrous labour, with its occasional relief by quick, aimless excitement; the state of passivity and absorption; the loss of the incentive of self-expression and creativeness". Two Grith Fyrd camps were opened in 1932 at Godshill in Hampshire, and in 1933 at Shining Cliff in Derbyshire. The camps were intended to form part of a self-sufficient community that would exchange goods and services with one another, and combat the decadence of contemporary society by training young men for self-reliance, communal living and service.

The Grith Fyrd campers - or Pioneers - were a mixture of young unemployed men, who were able to continue to draw benefit, and idealists who mostly came from middle-class backgrounds. The Pioneers built the camp buildings and furniture themselves, and produced their own food. Aldous Huxley wrote in the Sunday Chronicle that the Godshill camp was "almost a replica of an American backwoods settlement of a century ago". For Huxley, the primitive conditions were an admirable counterblow against the standardisation of modern urban, industrial society. He also admired the leisure activities of the men - Morris dancing, wood-carving, folk-singing and adult education.

Grith Fyrd was never a large movement. The camps were relatively small in scale, with between 30 and 50 inmates apiece. It had effectively died out as a living experiment by the late 1930s, though a handful of veterans gathered in the late 1940s to plan the Braziers Park community - essentially a residential adult college which functioned on communitarian lines, and was the childhood home of the singer Marianne Faithfull.

The present-day Grith pioneers provide an environment, through woodland camping and similar means, which gives those people taking part scope for self-realisation and the development of personal and social responsibility, wider educational opportunities, and a sense of responsibility towards the protection of the natural environment.

== See also ==
- Order of Woodcraft Chivalry
- Woodcraft Indians
- Ernest Thompson Seton
