= Listed buildings in Ashleyhay =

Ashleyhay is a civil parish in the Amber Valley district of Derbyshire, England. The parish contains ten listed buildings that are recorded in the National Heritage List for England. All the listed buildings are designated at Grade II, the lowest of the three grades, which is applied to "buildings of national importance and special interest". The parish contains the village of Ashleyhay, and is otherwise rural. The listed buildings consist of farmhouses and farm buildings, houses and cottages, and a chapel.

== Buildings ==
Name and location	Photograph	Date	Notes
Brownhouse Farmhouse and outbuilding 53.05391°N 1.56186°W	—	17th century	The farmhouse, which was remodelled in the 18th century, is in gritstone, with quoins, and a tile roof with coped gables. There is an L-shaped plan consisting of a range of two storeys and three bays, and a projecting gabled bay at the left with an attic. On the front are two doorways with plain lintels, and the windows are casements, some with mullions and some with hood moulds. The outbuilding to the west has an external stairway.
Dirty Lane End Cottage and outbuilding 53.05589°N 1.55841°W	—	17th century	The cottage, which was remodelled in the 19th century, is in gritstone with quoins and a tile roof. There are two storeys, and three bays. In the centre is a gabled porch, and the windows are casements. Attached on the north end is a two-storey single-bay outbuilding with a stable door.
Storer Farmhouse; 53.05734°N 1.56380°W		17th century	The farmhouse, which was altered in the 18th century, is in gritstone, with string courses, and a tile roof with coped gables, moulded kneelers, and ball finials. There are two storeys and an attic, and an L-shaped plan, consisting of a two-bay range, and a later lower wing. The doorway is in the angle, and most of the windows have two lights and mullions.
Sandhall Farmhouse; 53.06640°N 1.52946°W	—	Mid 18th century	The farmhouse is in gritstone with a tile roof, two storeys and four bays. The doorway has a plain surround, and a rectangular fanlight, and the windows are mullioned with two lights.
Spendlove Farmhouse; 53.05624°N 1.56348°W		18th century	The oldest part of the farmhouse is the rear range, with the rest dating from the early 19th century. It is in gritstone with quoins, and a tile roof with coped gables and ball finials. There are three storeys, three bays, and a lean-to on the west. In the rear range are two-light mullioned windows, and the front range contains 20th-century casement windows.
New Buildings Farmhouse and outbuilding 53.06240°N 1.55931°W	—	Late 18th century	The building is in gritstone with a tile roof and two storeys. The farmhouse to the right has three bays, and contains two doorways with quoined surrounds, and windows, most of which are mullioned. In the outbuilding to the left are doorways in both floors with quoined surrounds, an external stairway, and slit vents.
Toplas Farmhouse and outbuildings 53.05809°N 1.56375°W	—	Late 18th century	The farmhouse and outbuildings are in gritstone and have a tile roof, hipped at the right end. There are two storeys and an L-shaped plan. The south range has five bays, the right three bays forming the house. This has a doorway with a quoined surround, and a heavy lintel, two-light mullioned windows, and stairs leading down to a cellar. The left two bays and the west range of three bays form the outbuildings. These contain quoined doorways and other openings, including a stable door, casement windows, and a taking-in door.
Beighton Hill House; 53.06110°N 1.56697°W	—	Early 19th century	The house is in gritstone with a coved eaves cornice and a tile roof. There are two storeys, three bays, and a later rear extension. The doorway is in the centre, and the windows are sashes.
Chequer Meadow Cottage; 53.06858°N 1.54670°W	—	Early 19th century	A gritstone house that has a tile roof with coped gables. There are two storeys and two bays. The central doorway has a plain surround, the windows have iron frames, and to the northeast is an outbuilding with a lower roof.
Primitive Methodist Chapel; 53.06097°N 1.56656°W	—	1851	The chapel is in gritstone with a hipped tile roof and a single storey. In the centre is a doorway with plain jambs, a lintel and a keystone. This is flanked by windows with segmental heads, and above the doorway is an inscribed and dated plaque.
