= Oakhurst House =

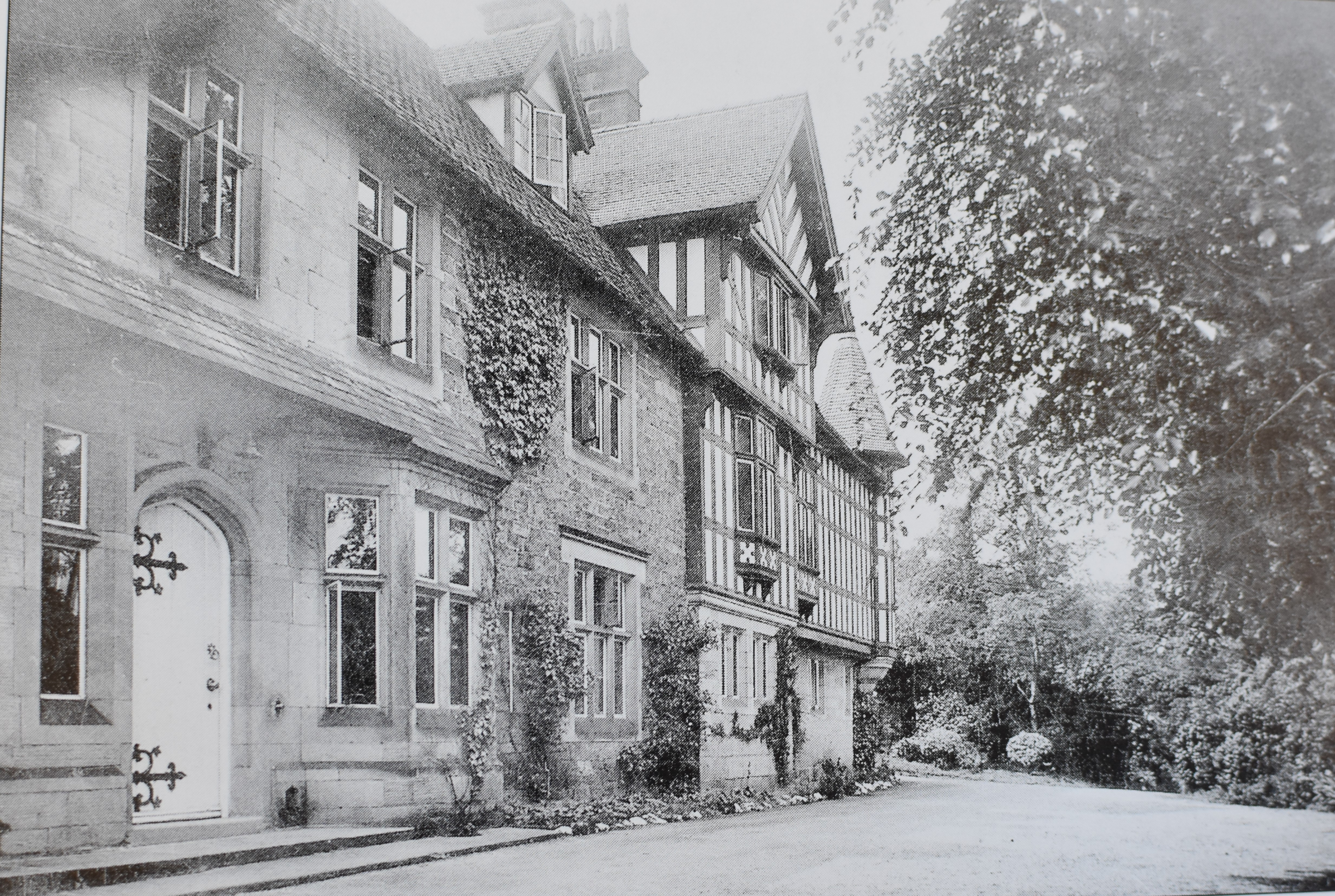
- Eastern elevation of house, showing 1848 entrance and 1894 extensions
- Interactive map of the Oakhurst House area

General information
- Type: Country house
- Architectural style: Arts and Crafts, Jacobean
- Location: near Ambergate, Derbyshire, England
- Coordinates: 53.0661°N 1.4934°W
- Completed: 1848
- Demolished: 2026
- Cost: £1000 (1847 Rebuild)
- Client: Hurt Estate, Richard Johnson & Nephew Wireworks

Design and construction
- Architect: John Douglas
- Main contractor: Robinsons of Belper (1847 Rebuild)

Oakhurst House was a country house in Shining Cliff Woods above the village of Ambergate in Derbyshire. The house was rebuilt in 1848 by Francis Hurt behind his iron forge in Ambergate. It was occupied by the Johnson family of industrialists for many years who were benefactors in the local area, building the parish church of St. Anne at Ambergate.

== History ==
=== 19th–early 20th century ===
Originally a forge house, it was leased by the Hurts to the Iron Master Charles Mold, who died there in 1846. Hurt persuaded the young William Henry Mold to live at Oakhurst in 1847 and promised £1,000 to rebuild it. Construction of the new house was by Robinson of Belper and the new house was ready for occupation in 1848. Mold occupied the house and forge until 1859 when all works ceased.

The forge and house appear to have remained vacant until in 1874 the forge was leased from the Hurt Estate by the Richard Johnson and Nephew, wire manufacturers of Manchester, a wireworks being established on the site. Thewlis Johnson occupied the property from around that time, in addition to his Cheshire residence.

Between 1888 and 1894, the house was extended a number of times for the Johnson family, in the neo-Jacobean Arts and Crafts style for which it is best known locally, potentially to the designs of Cheshire architect John Douglas who was carrying other work in Derbyshire at that time. The stable block was also rebuilt and the grounds landscaped.

The sale of contents in 1922 describes the property as having "eleven bedrooms, morning room, dining room, drawing room, billiard room, sitting room, nursery, three dressing rooms, two bathrooms, butler’s pantry, housekeeper’s room, scullery, kitchen, larder, game larder and boot house". Between 1924 and 1937, the house was used as a retreat for the local diocese. The house is described as a "fair-sized country mansion" with "accommodation for twenty four" and a "large room being converted to a comely chapel".

=== Late 20th–21st century ===
The diocesan rest home ceased operation in 1937 due to the expansion of the adjoining works. The house was requisitioned during the Second World War and was later divided into twelve flats. The deteriorating condition of the building led to the property being vacated during the 1970s.

The property was later offered to Amber Valley Borough Council but with repair costs estimated to exceed £500,000, this offer was refused. An application for statutory listing of the building was refused and after a period of marketing, in 1994 permission was granted to demolish the house. In 2000 the wireworks and estate were purchased by the Lichfield Group and the wireworks are now used as industrial storage. The stables and various other estate buildings are now leased as private accommodation. Oakhurst House was demolished in January 2026.

== Current deterioration ==
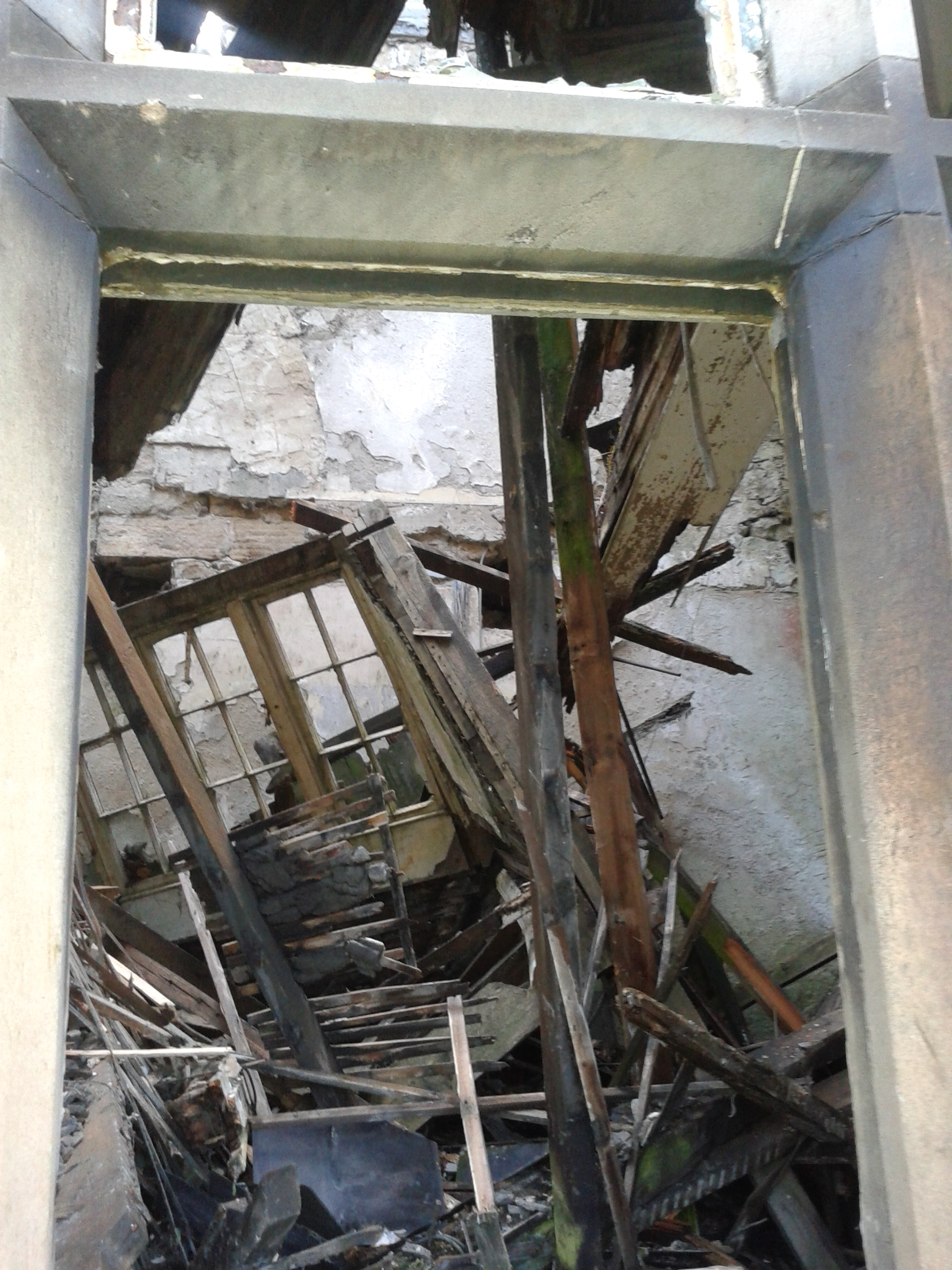
Showing current extent of dereliction with floor joists and window frames collapsed

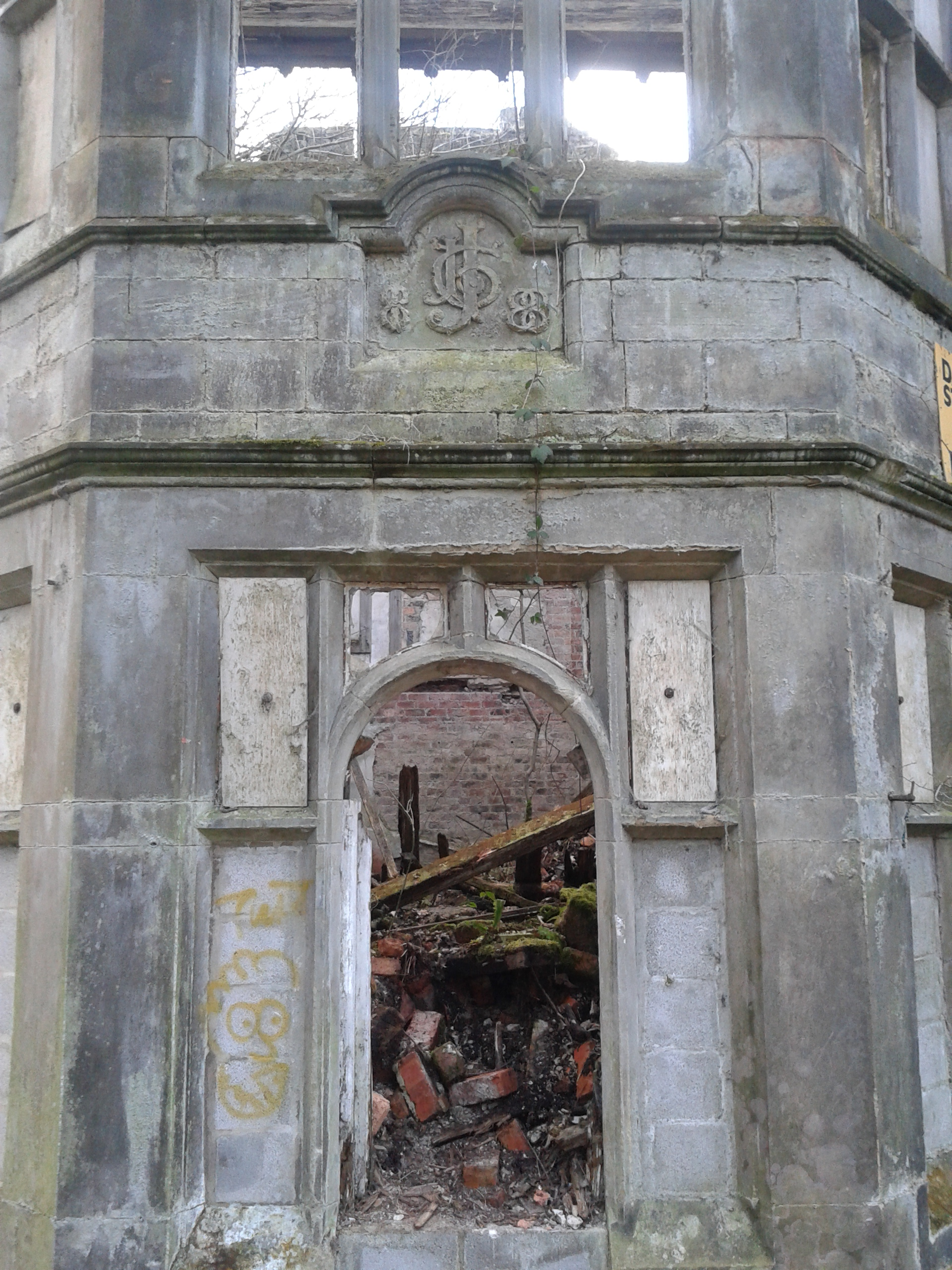
Rear bay of the garden façade, constructed in 1888 with Johnson family crest

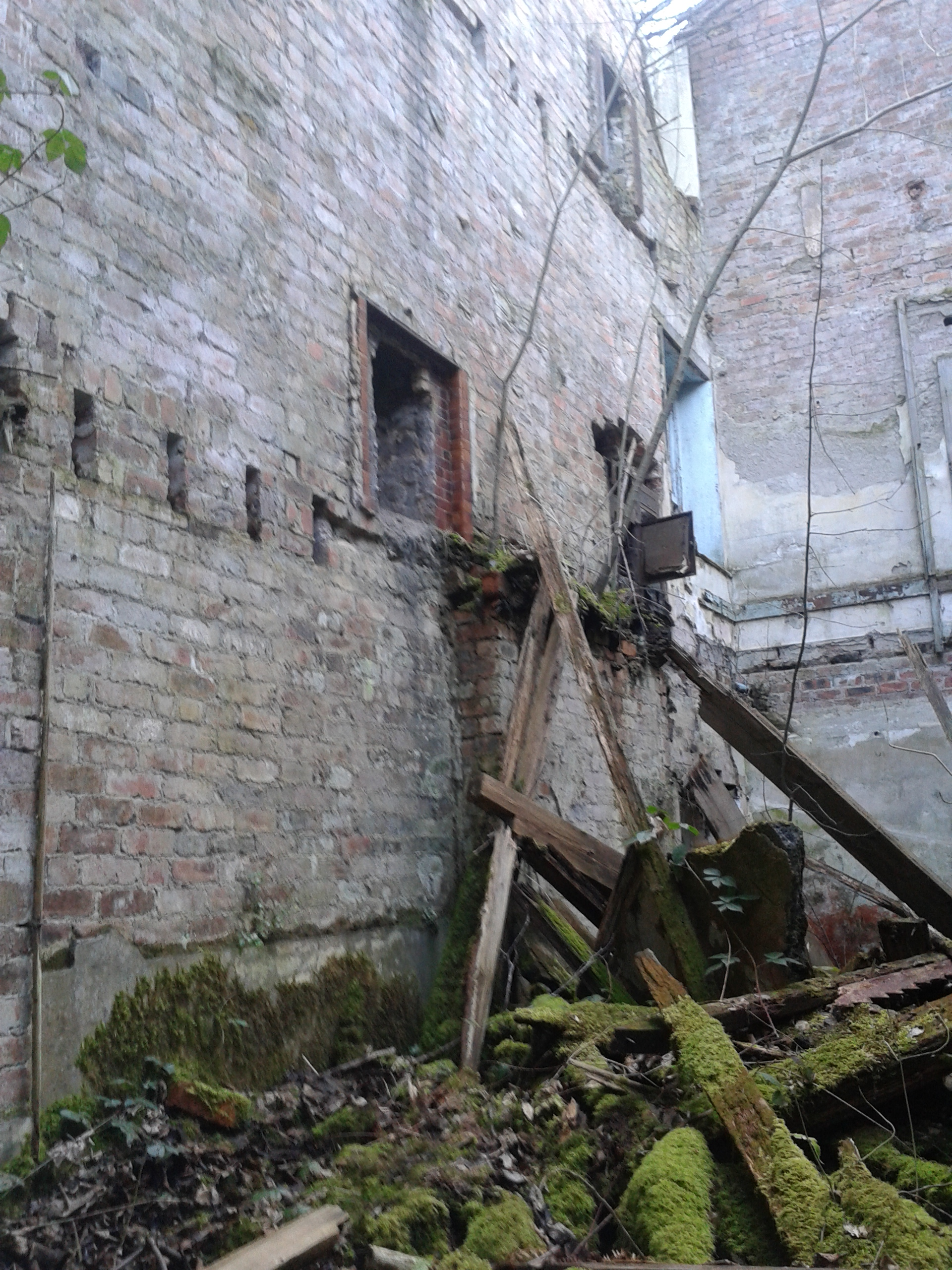
Interior detailing on ruin wall showing where floor joists were hung and former fireplaces

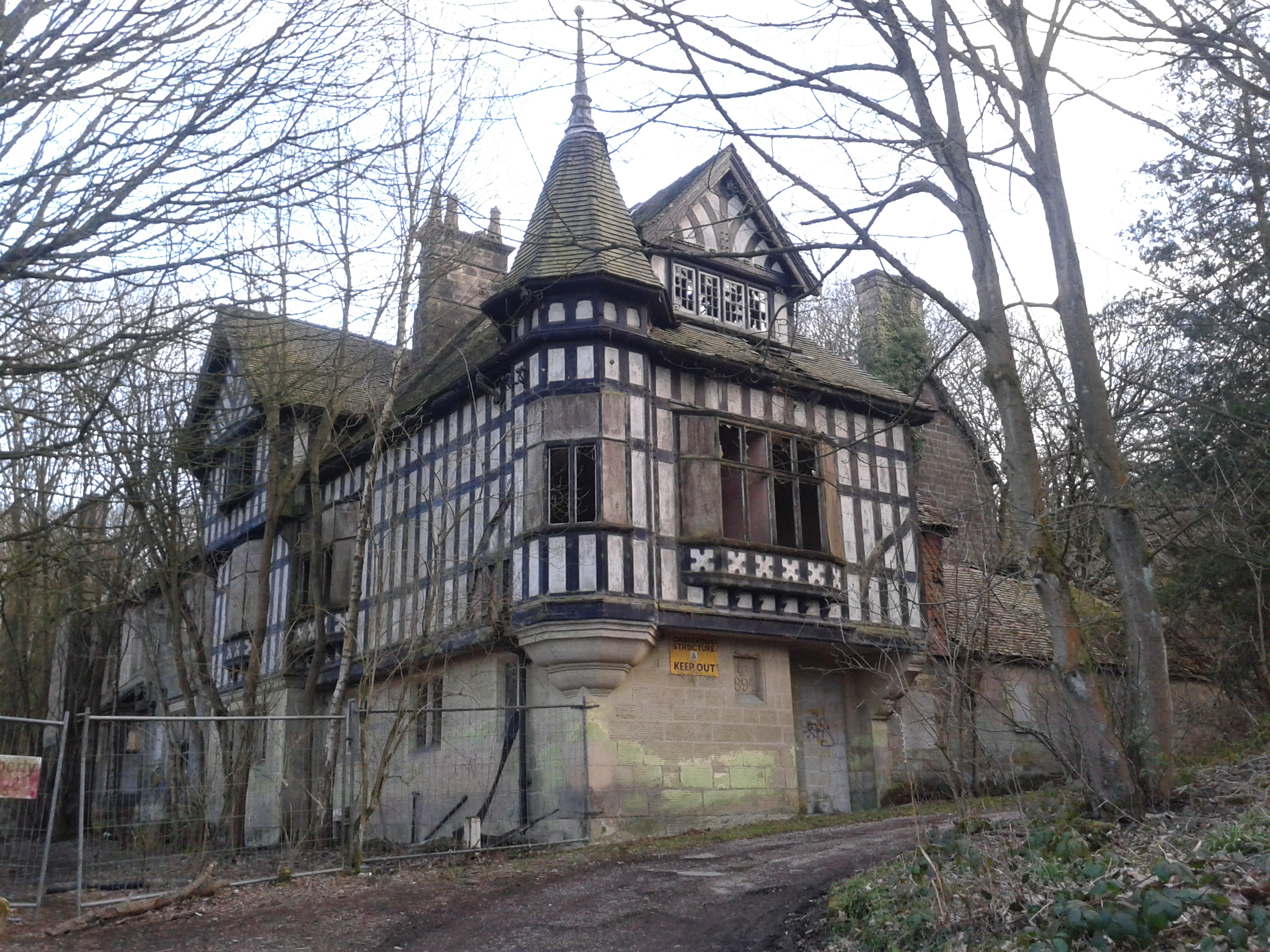
Showing north-eastern elevation from drive, 1894 neo-Jacobean sections in fair condition when compared to rest of the house
