= Alport Height =

Hill in Derbyshire, England

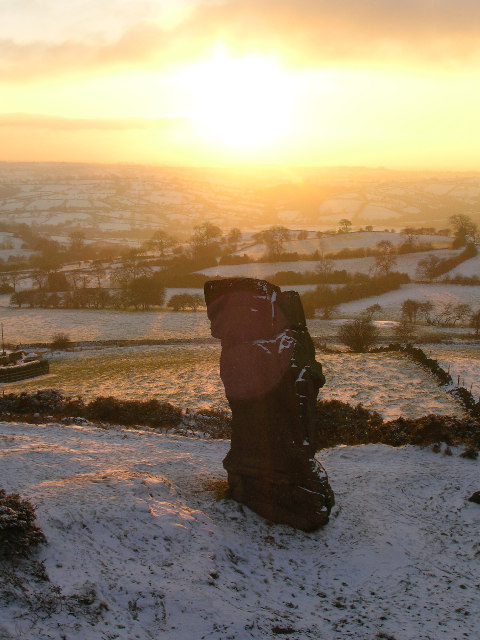
- The Alport Stone, just below the summit of Alport Height

Highest point
- Elevation: 314 m (1,030 ft)
- Coordinates: 53°03′36″N 1°32′47″W

Geography
- Location within Derbyshire
- Location: Peak District, England
- OS grid: SK305515
- Topo map: OS Landranger 119

Alport Height is a hill near Wirksworth in Derbyshire. It is a popular picnic site, since it has extensive views to the South, and is the first hill over 1,000 ft (300 m) within easy reach of the Derby area. Like Shining Cliff Woods, 2 km to the east, it is in the care of the National Trust. It was one of their first acquisitions in Derbyshire, acquired in 1930.

It is possible to see Derby city centre from the summit, as well as The Wrekin, the Long Mynd, and the Clee Hill. It is also possible to see the Sutton Coldfield and Lichfield masts, and the Birmingham city centre skyline, and also the Lickey Hills just beyond Birmingham. The Pye Green BT Tower on Cannock Chase can also be seen.

There are eight radio masts and associated buildings in a compound on the summit (not on Trust land).

The hill is sometimes known as Alport Stone after the name of the conspicuous pillar of quarried gritstone, some 20 ft (6.1 m) high, near its summit. The boulder has 3 or 4 recognised climbing routes up it, one being an 8 m route of climbing-grade E5. John Gill's bouldering website has early photographs of pioneer climbers in action on the Stone.

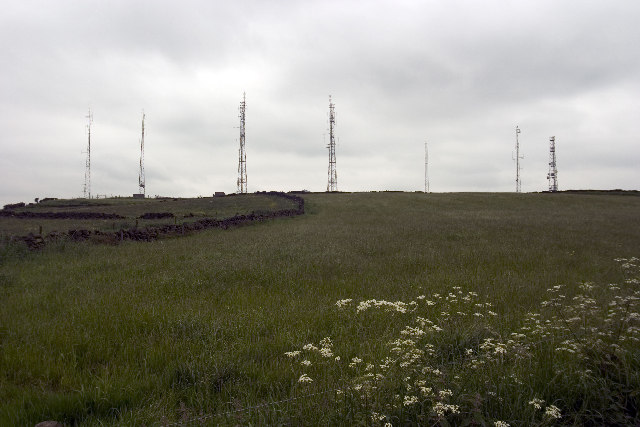
The array of masts at Alport Height

== See also ==
- Alport Castles in the High Peak area
- Alport, a hamlet in the White Peak area
