= Alderwasley =

Village in Derbyshire, England

Coordinates: 53.07°N 01.53°W

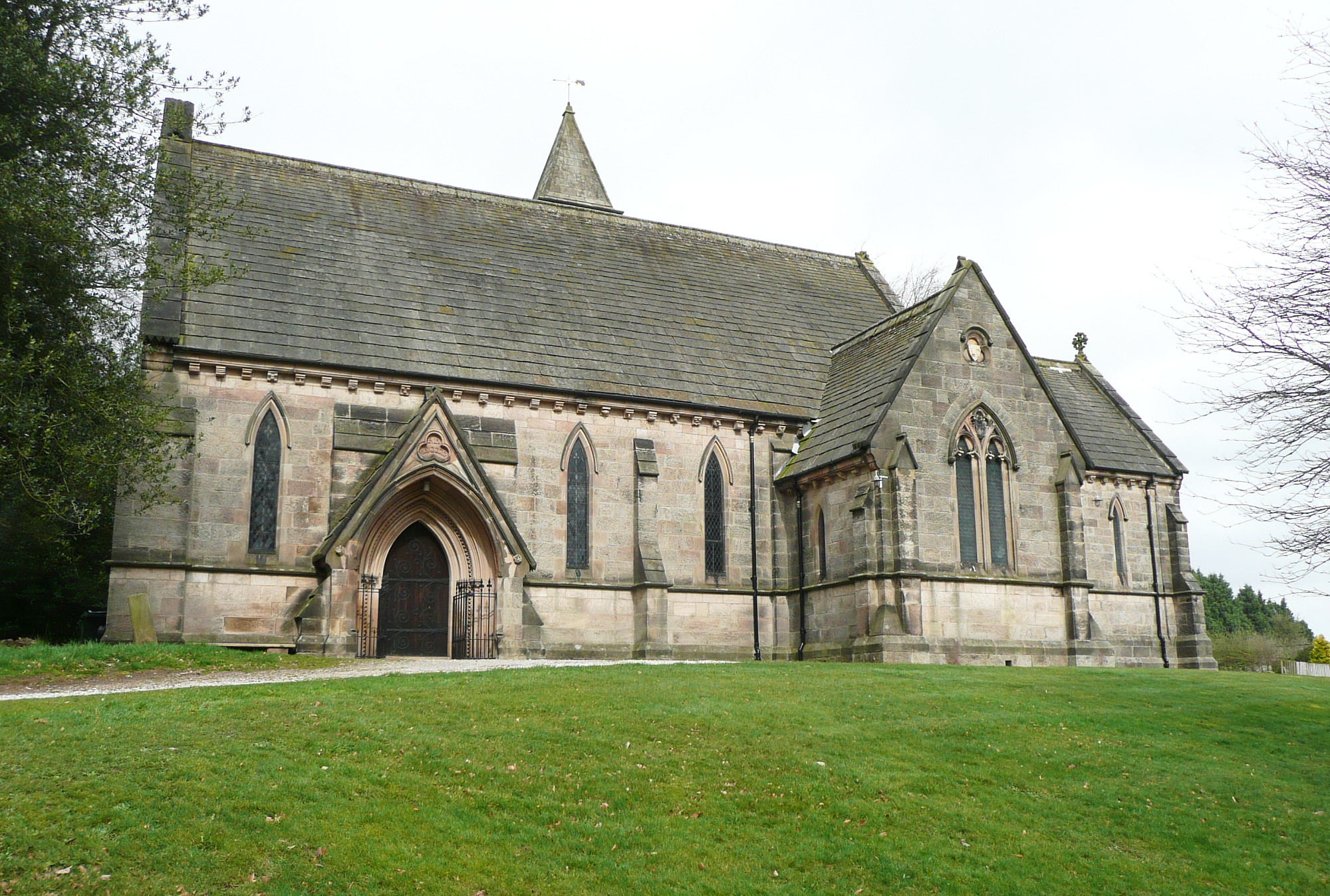
- All Saints Church

- Location within Derbyshire
- Population: 469 (2011)
- OS grid reference: SK3153
- Shire county: Derbyshire
- Region: East Midlands
- Country: England
- Sovereign state: United Kingdom
- Post town: Belper
- Postcode district: DE56
- Police: Derbyshire
- Fire: Derbyshire
- Ambulance: East Midlands

Alderwasley (/ˌælərzˈliː/ AL-ərz-LEE) is a village and civil parish in the Amber Valley district of Derbyshire, England. The population of the civil parish as of the 2011 census was 469. Alderwasley Hall is the home to one of the sites of Alderwasley Hall School which is a special school for children and young people with Aspergers and/or Speech and Language Difficulties. It is about six miles north of Belper.

The village's name derives from the Old English for "clearing near alluvial land growing with alders". In the Middle Ages, it was a manor within Duffield Frith and contained the Royal Park of Shining Cliff Woods and a later park was formed to the south called Bradley Laund. In 1284 the Shining Cliff was given to William Foun by Edmund Crouchback, Earl of Lancaster. Foun was given the job of maintaining the boundaries between the Pendleton and Peatpits Brooks.

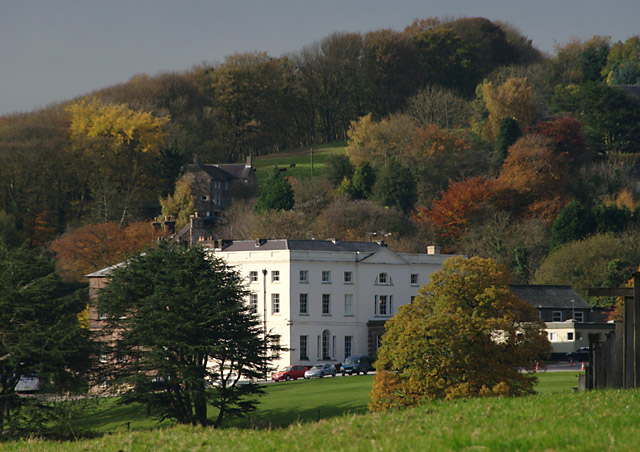
Alderwasley Hall – home of the Hurt family – now a school

This passed to Thomas Lowe by marriage in 1471. His son Anthony Lowe, as gentleman of the bedchamber for Henry VIII, was made a hereditary forester of Duffield Frith in 1523, and awarded the Manor of Alderwasley, with Ashleyhay, in 1528. In 1670 the whole estate passed, again by marriage, to Nicholas Hurt of Casterne in Staffordshire, a direct descendant of William Foun, and in 1715 he formed a new park. In 1905 this contained a herd of eighty fallow deer and what was considered to be the finest timber, especially oak, to be found. However, the estate was sold and broken up in the 1920s.

The village has a reputation for its findings of silver treasure, namely coin clippings. The church plate of Alderwasley (a chalice, paten, flagon, and alms dish) were made from clippings of Charles I silver coins weighing 8lb, dug up in Bacon Meadow on 27 March 1846, according to a label on an earthenware jar in which the clippings had been hidden. Further clippings were uncovered by three brothers in their garden in the village, as recorded on a BBC Blue Peter programme in 1971.

== See also ==
- Listed buildings in Alderwasley
