= List of places in Derbyshire =

This is a list of places in Derbyshire, England.

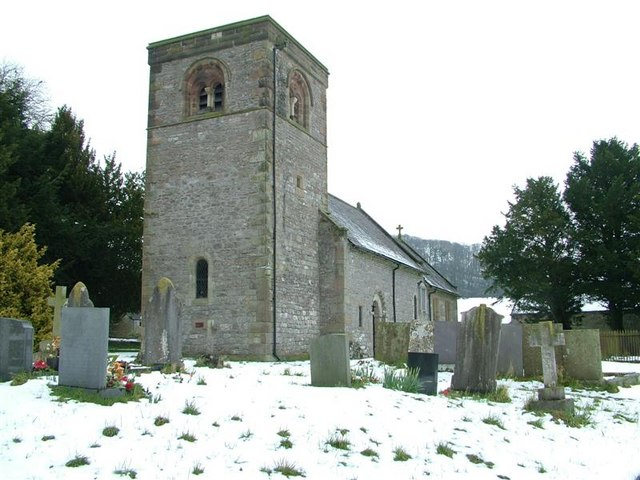
Alsop en le Dale church

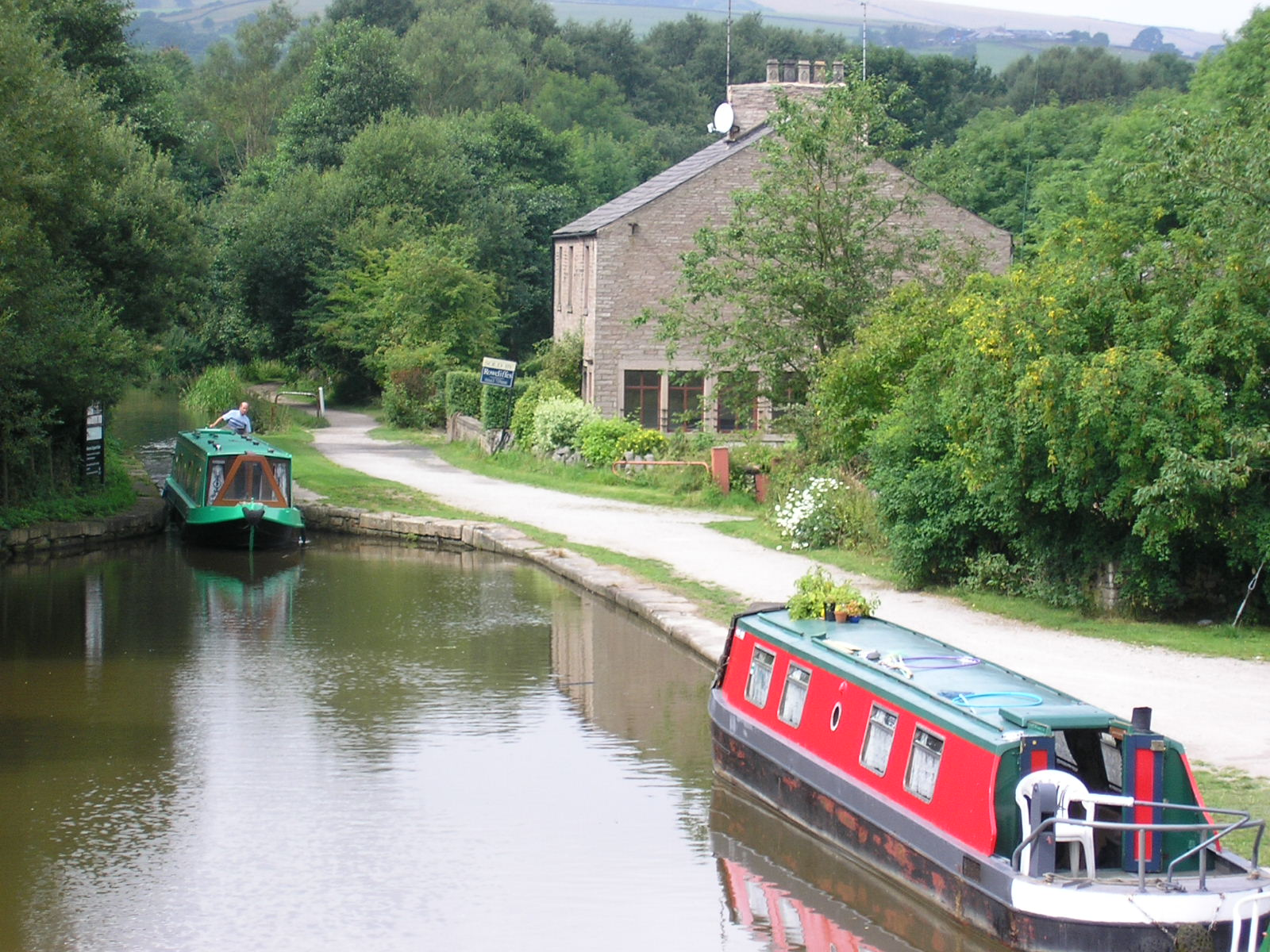
Bugsworth Basin

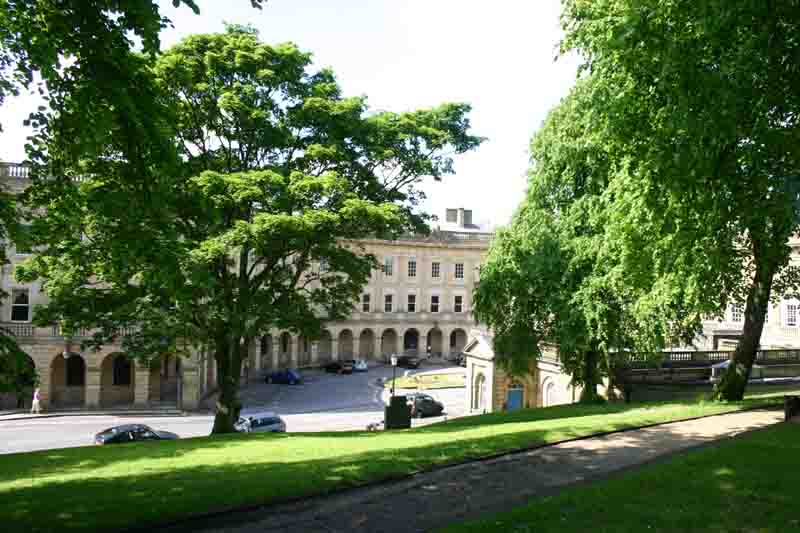
Buxton, The Crescent

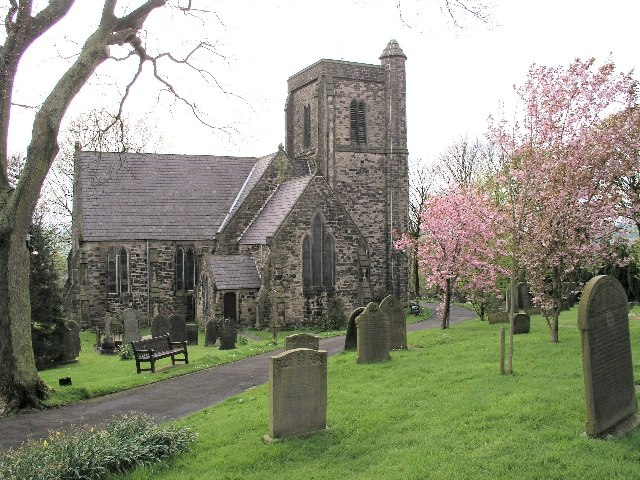
Charlesworth church

Chesterfield's 'Crooked Spire'

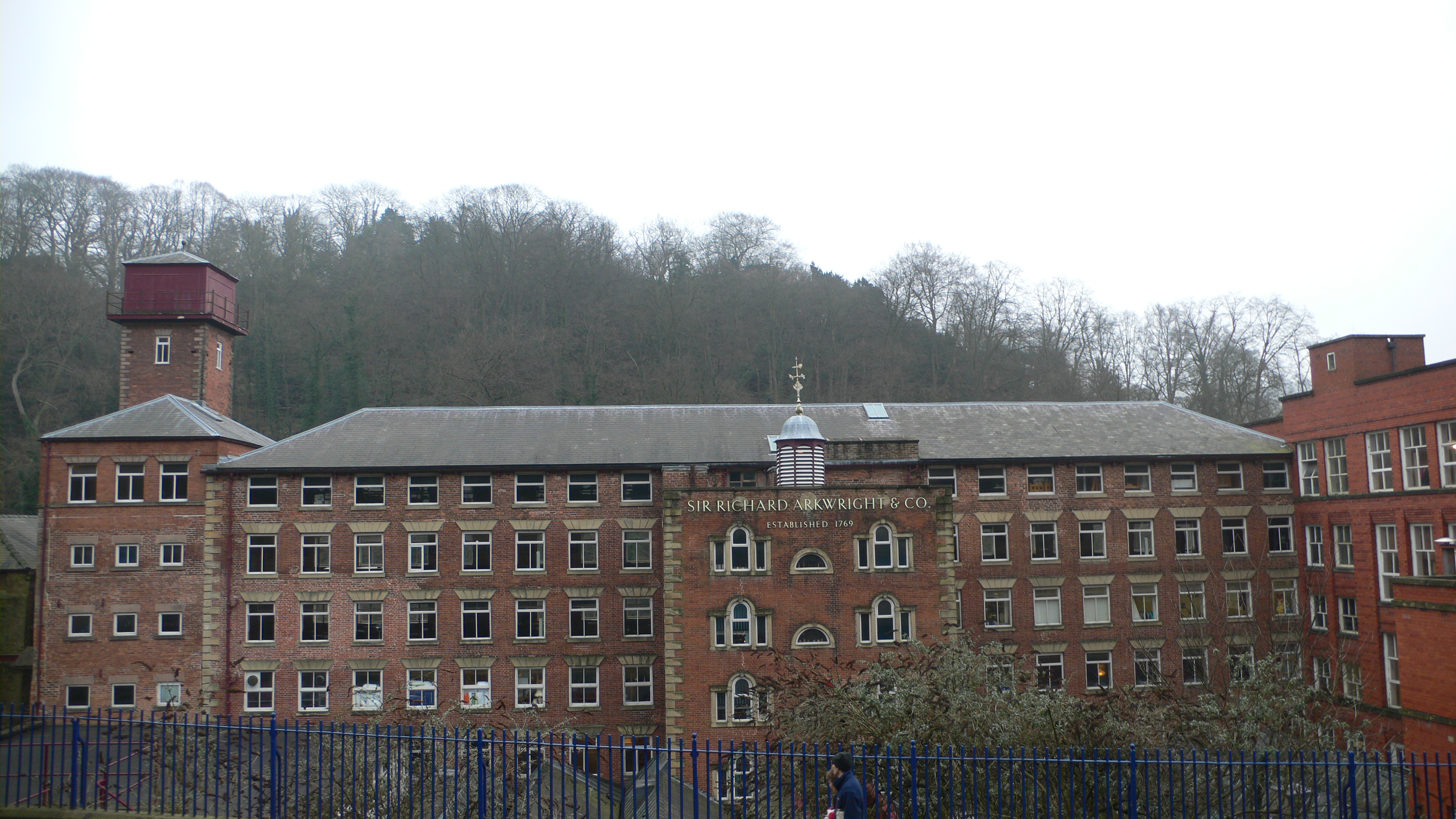
Derwent Valley Mills World Heritage site

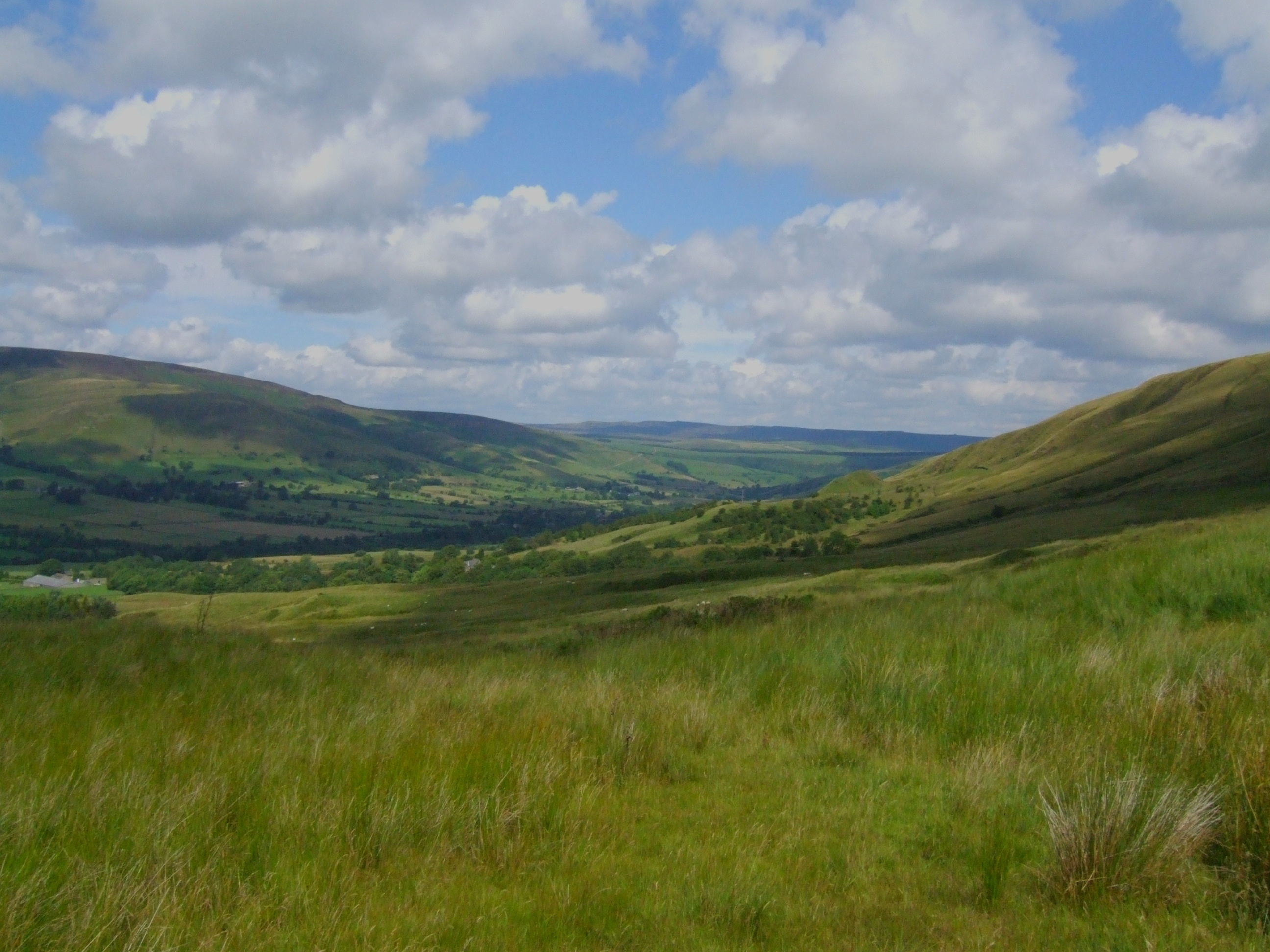
The Vale of Edale

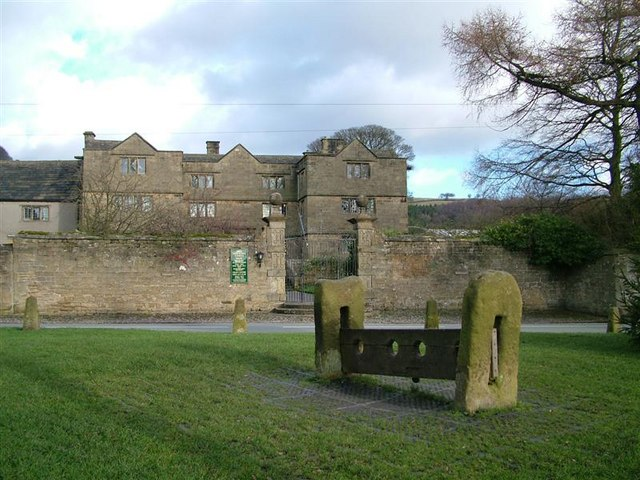
Eyam Hall and stocks

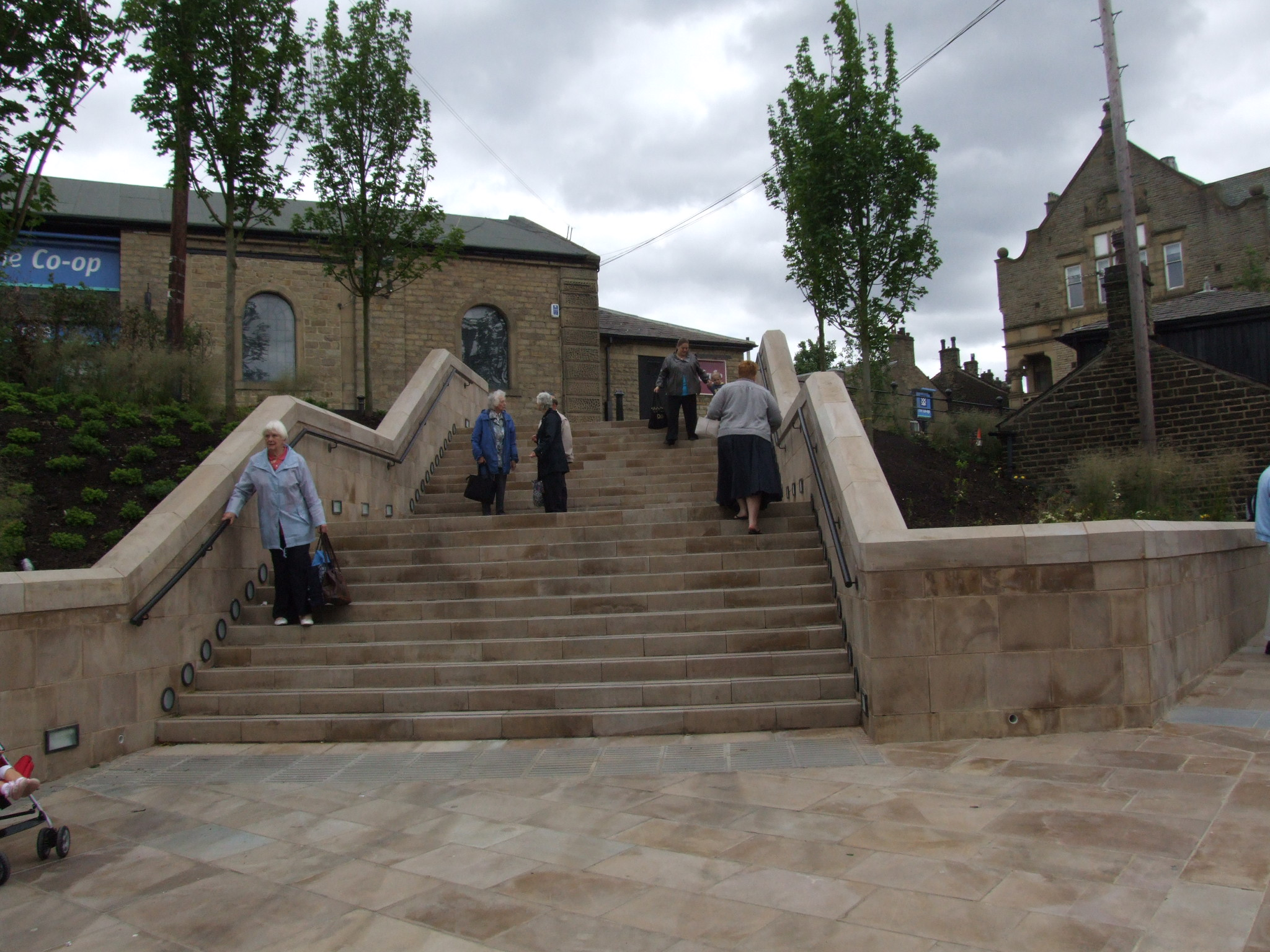
Glossop, Henry Street

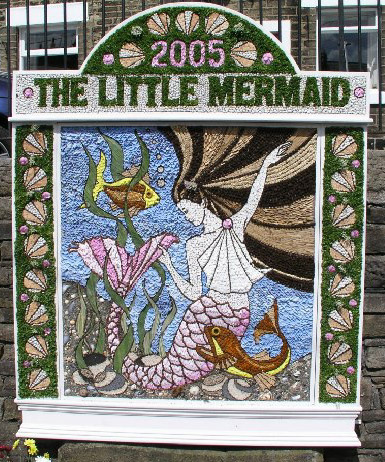
Hayfield Well Dressing

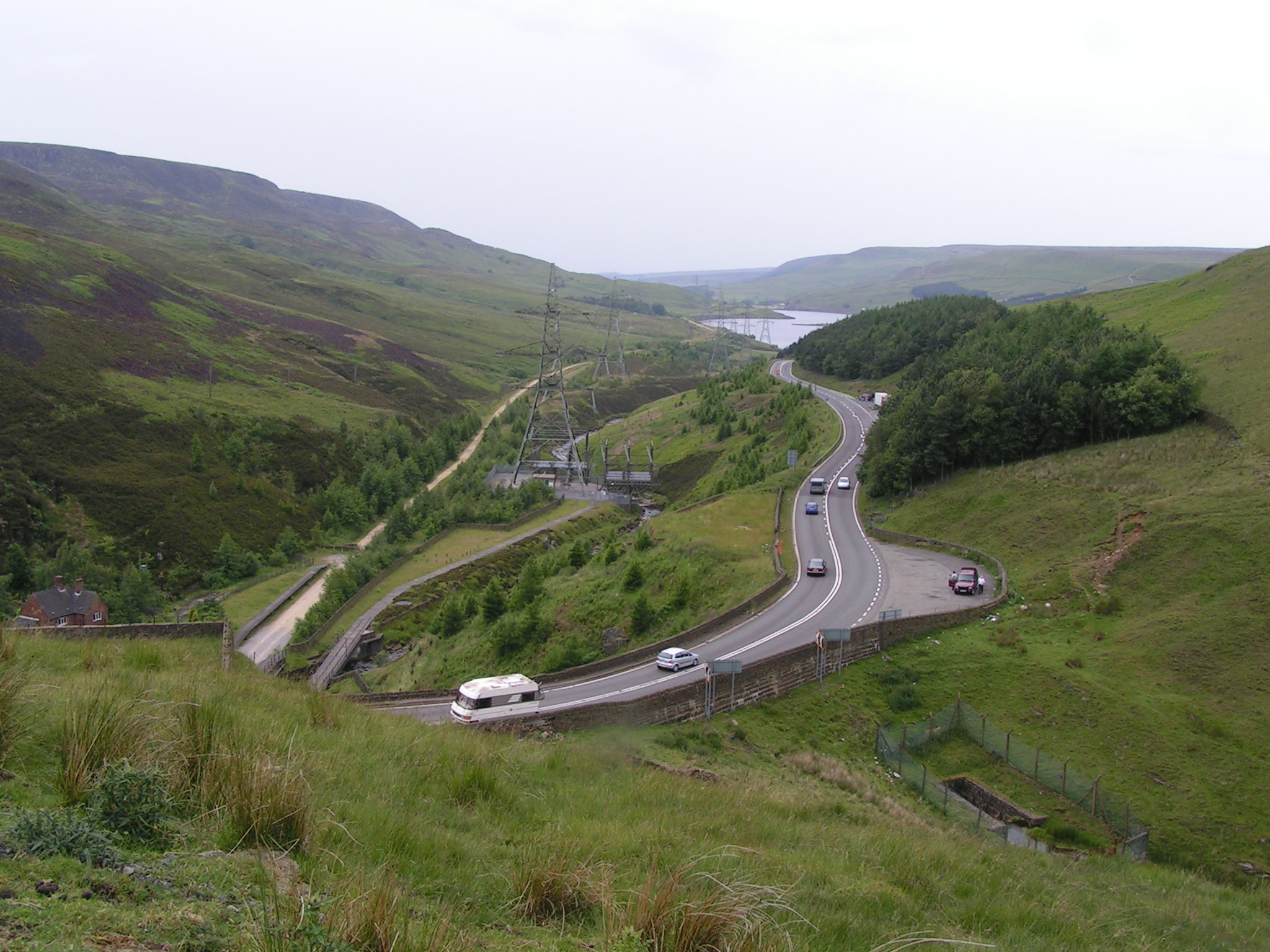
Longdendale from Woodhead

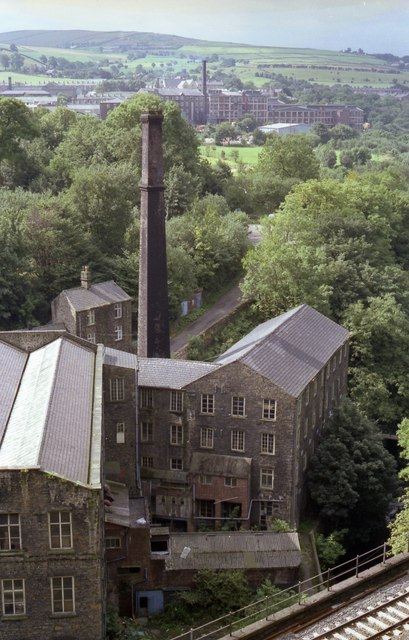
New Mills, Torr Vale Mill

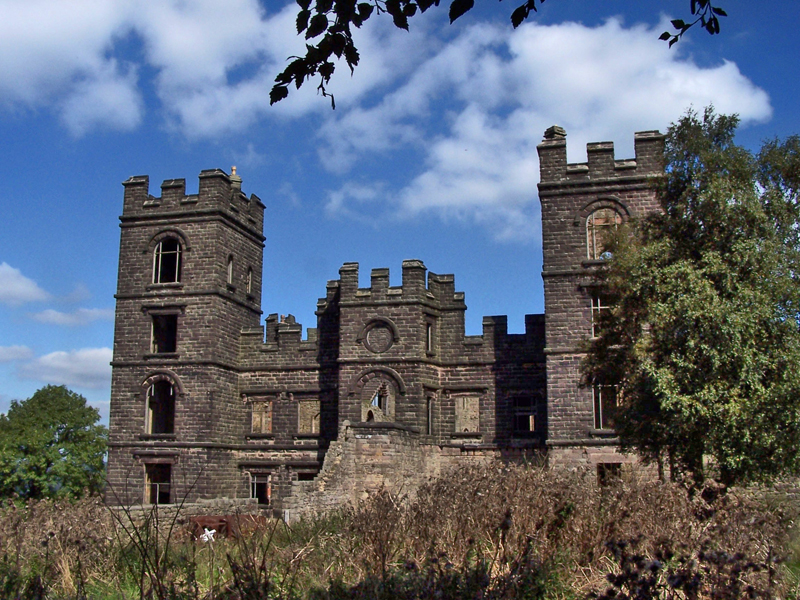
Riber Castle

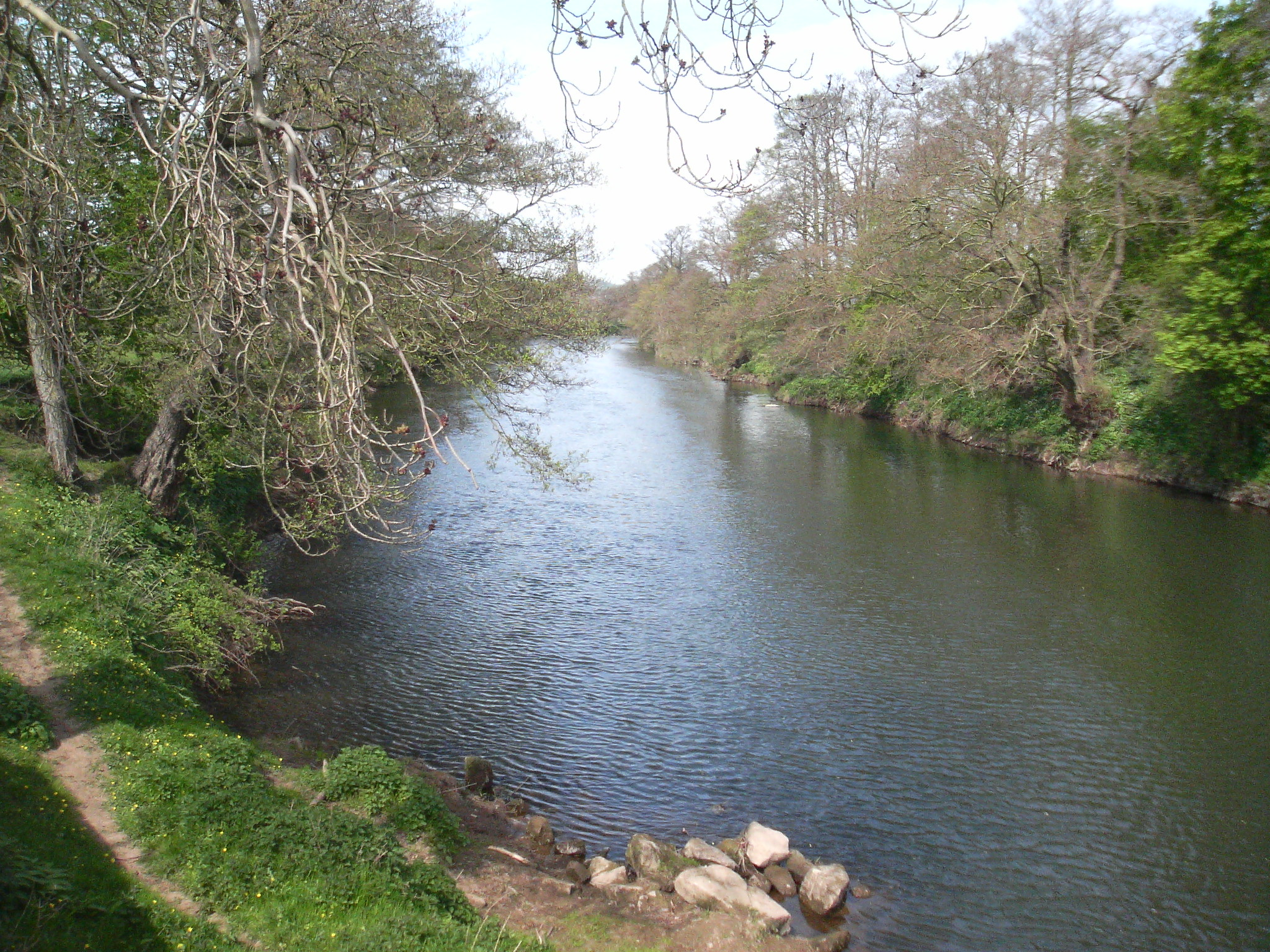
River Derwent, south of Duffield

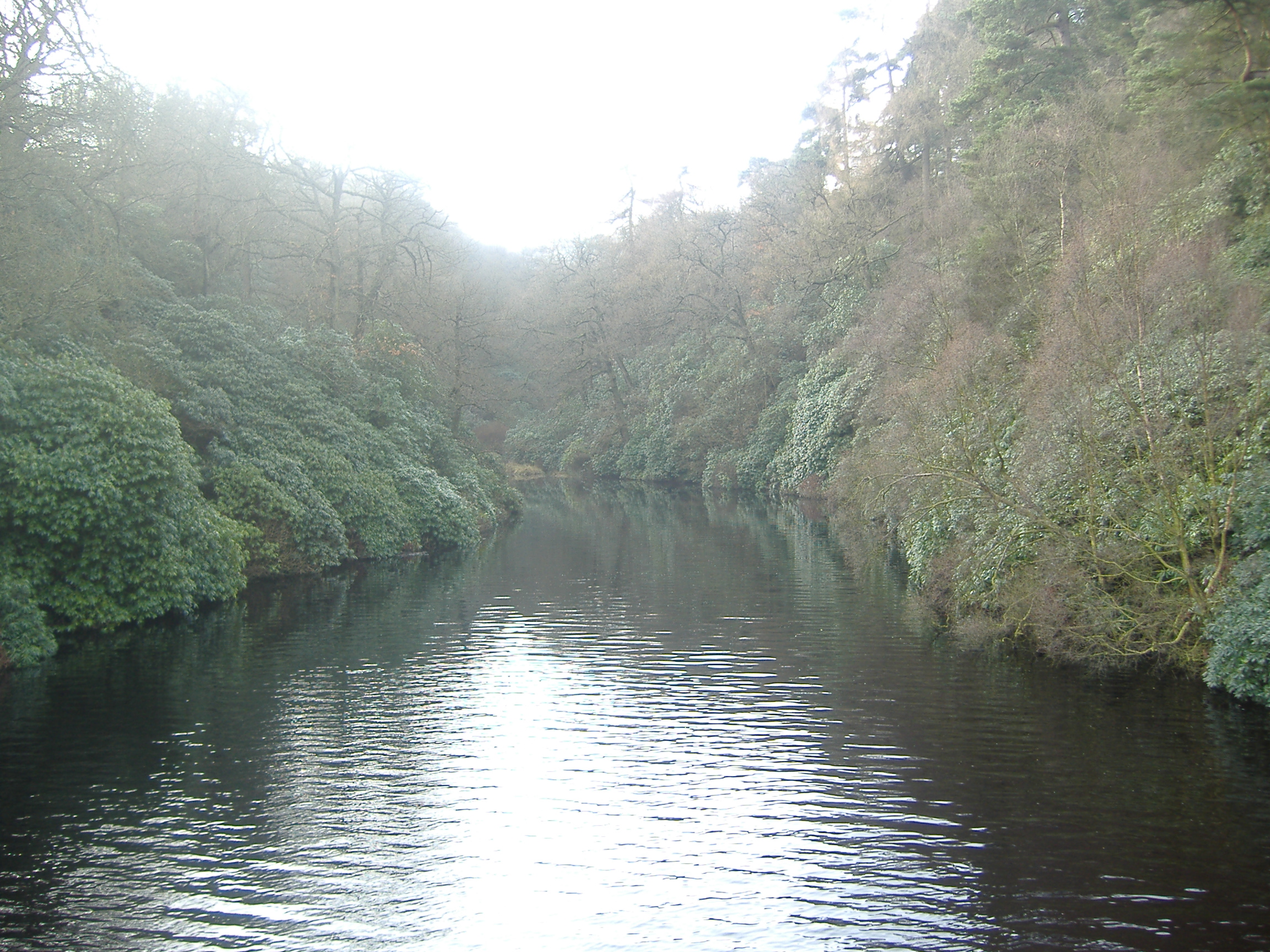
River Goyt

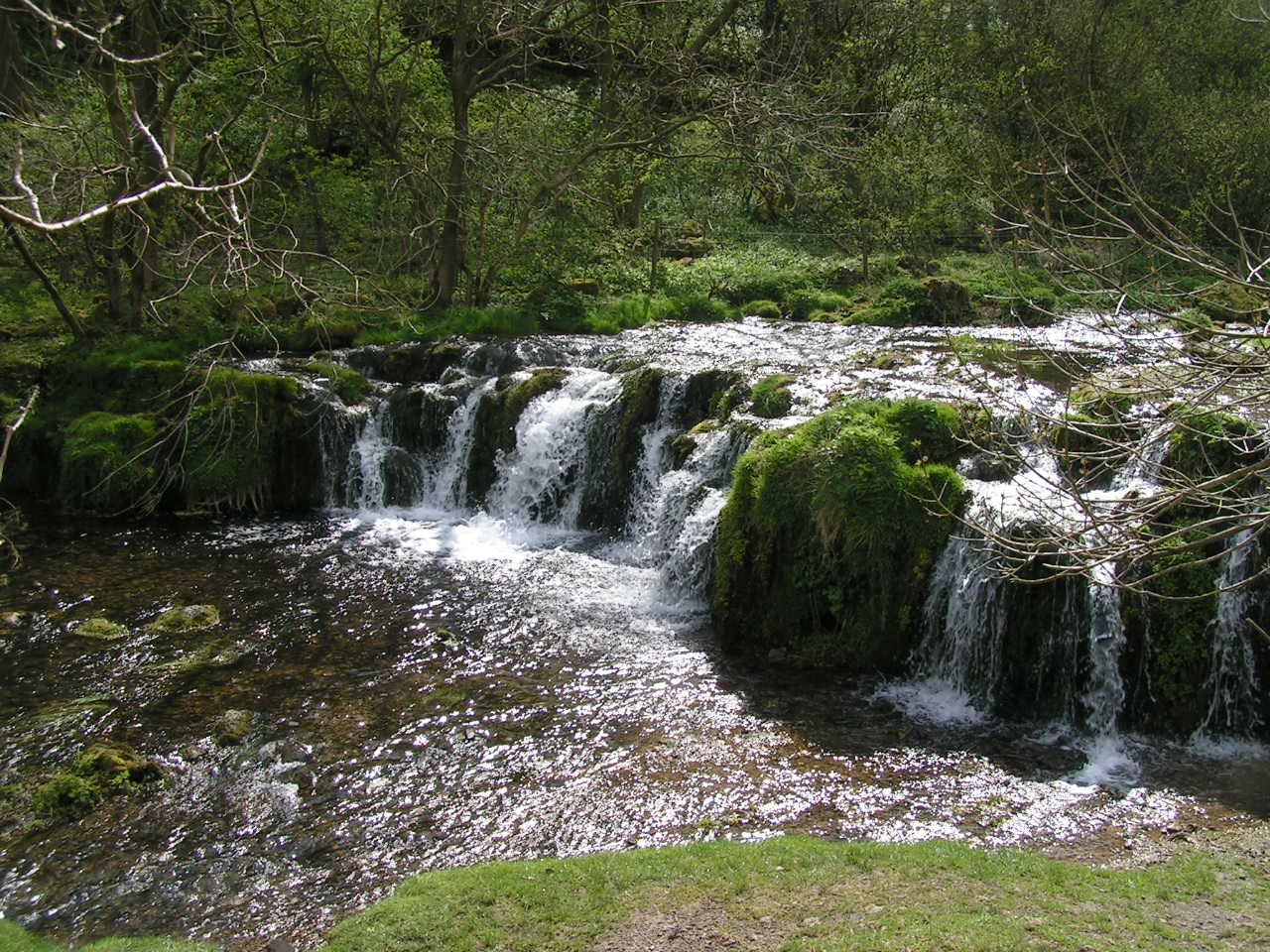
River Lathkill

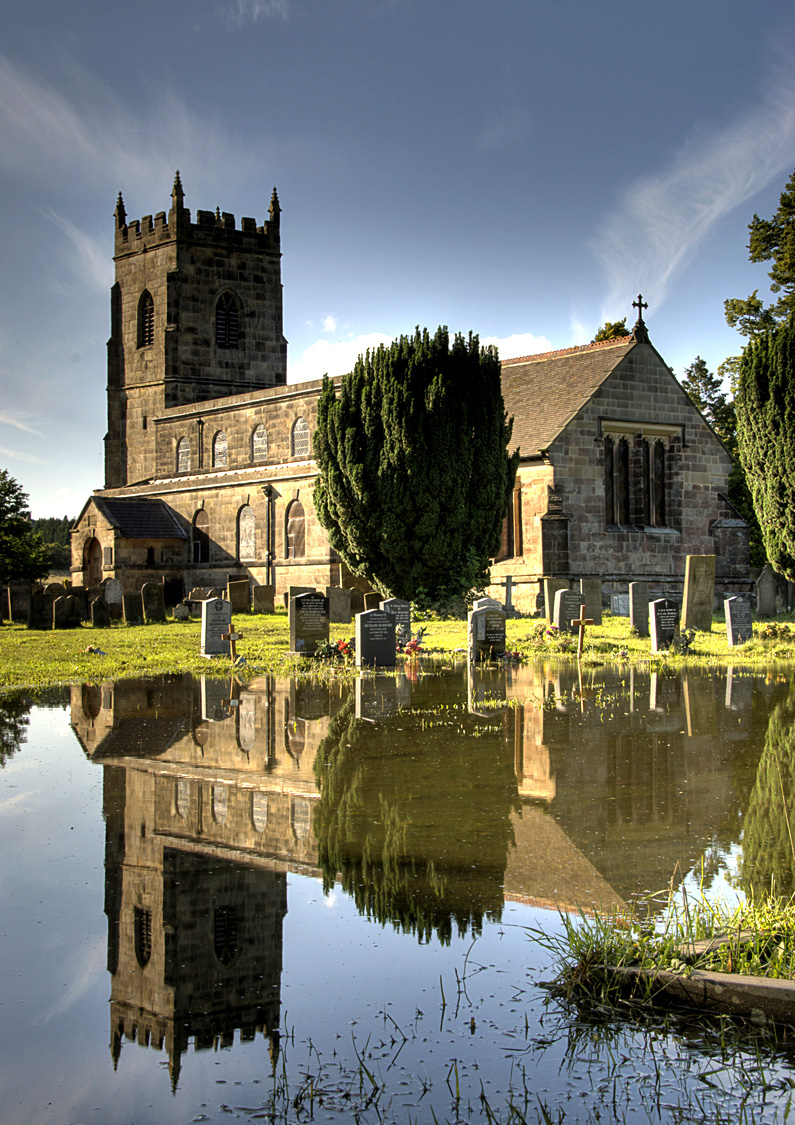
South Wingfield church

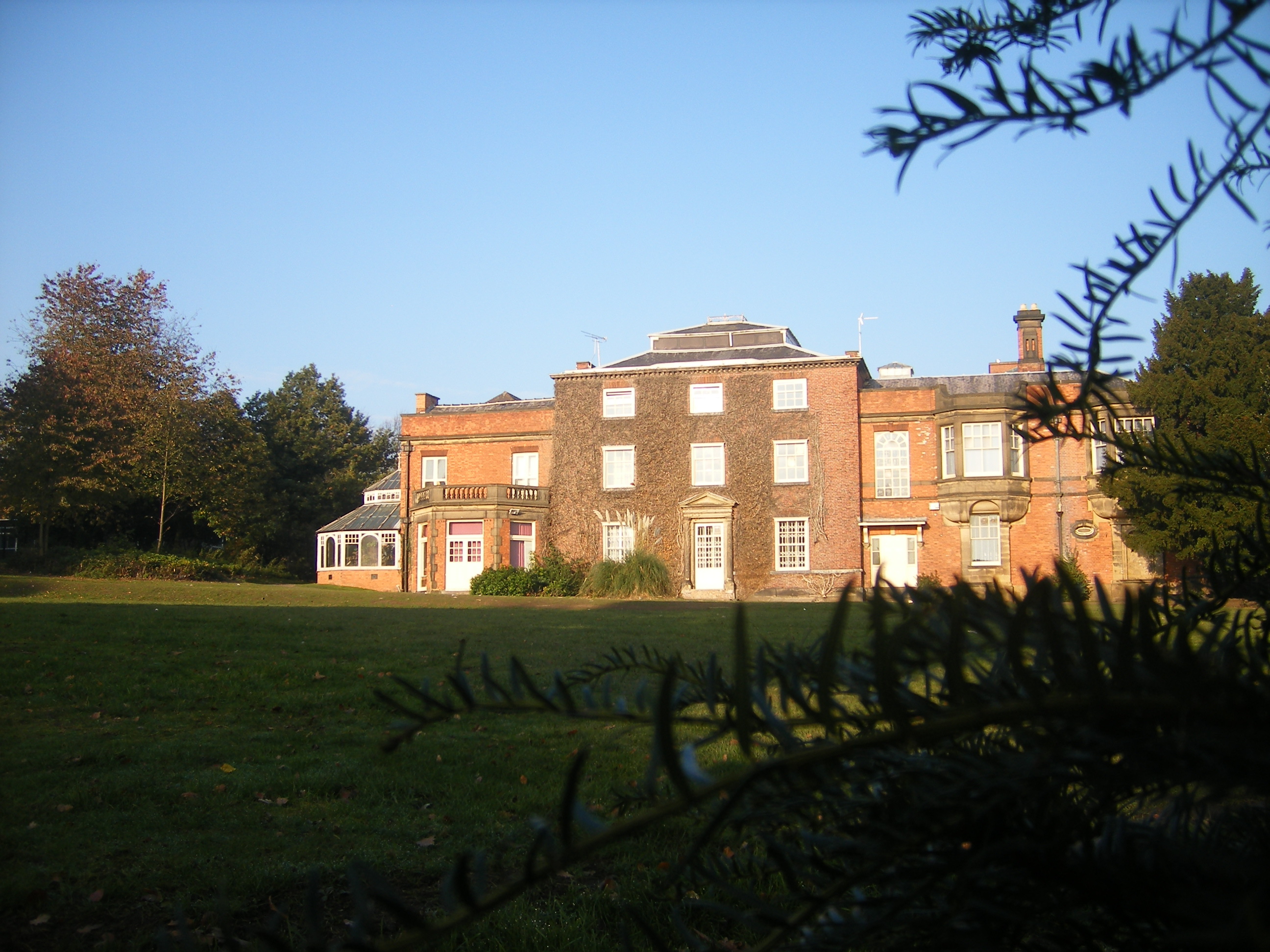
Swanwick Hall

== A ==
- Abbot's Chair
- Abney
- Aldercar
- Alderwasley
- Aldwark
- Alfreton
- Alicehead
- Alkmonton
- Allenton
- Allestree
- Alport
- Alport Hill
- River Alport
- Alsop en le Dale
- Alton
- Alvaston
- Ambaston
- Ambergate
- Amber Valley
- Anacrehill
- Ankerbold
- Ann Croft
- Apperknowle
- Arkwright Town
- Arleston
- Arnfield
- Ashbourne
- Ashbourne Green
- Ashford-in-the-Water
- Ashgate
- Ashleyhay
- River Ashop
- Ashopton
- Ashover
- Ashover Hay
- Aston (High Peak)
- Aston (Derbyshire Dales)
- Aston Heath
- Aston Moor
- Aston-on-Trent
- Astwith
- Atlow
- Ault Hucknall

== B ==
- Badway Green
- Bagshaw
- Bakershillock
- Bakestone Moor
- Bakewell
- Ballidon
- Bamford
- Barber Booth
- Bargate
- Barlborough
- Barlborough Common
- Barlow
- Barlow Common
- Barrow upon Trent
- Barton Blount
- Baslow
- Batham Gate
- Bearwardcote
- Beeley
- Beighton Fields
- Belper
- Belph
- Biggin (Dovedale and Parwich Ward)
- Biggin by Hulland
- Birch Vale
- Birchover
- Birdholme
- Blackbrook
- Blackwell (near Alfreton)
- Blackwell (near Buxton)
- Blackwell in the Peak
- Blue John Cavern
- Bole Hill (Ashover)
- Bolehill (Barlow)
- Bolehill (Wirksworth)
- Bolsover
- Bolsover Castle
- Bonsall
- Borrowash
- Bottoms Reservoir
- Boundary
- Bowshaw
- Boylestone
- Boylestonfield
- Boythorpe
- Brackenfield
- Bradbourne
- Bradley
- Bradwell
- Bradwell Hills
- Brailsford
- Brailsford Green
- Bramley
- Bramley Vale
- Brampton
- Brassington
- Breadsall
- Breamfield
- Breaston
- Bretby
- Bretton
- Bridgemont
- Brightgate
- Brimington
- Broadmeadows
- Brookbottom
- Brosscroft
- Brosterfield
- Brough
- Brushfield
- Bugsworth
- Bullbridge
- Burbage
- Burley Hill
- Burnaston
- Burntheath
- Butterley
- Buxton
- Buxworth

== C ==
- Caldwell
- Calke
- Calow
- Calver
- Carr Vale
- Carsington
- Cartledge
- Castle Gresley
- Castleton
- Catton Hall
- Cauldwell
- Chaddesden
- Chapel-en-le-Frith
- Chapel Milton
- Charlestown
- Charlesworth
- Chatsworth
- Chellaston
- Chelmorton
- Chesterfield
- Chevinside
- Chinley
- Chisworth
- Chunal
- Church Broughton
- Church Gresley
- Clay Cross
- Clowne
- Coal Aston
- Coddington
- Codnor
- Codnor Breach
- Combs
- Common Side (Barlow)
- Common Side (Brailsford)
- Common Side (Heanor)
- Common End
- Conksbury
- Coplow Dale
- Corbriggs
- Cotmanhay
- Coton in the Elms
- Cowerslane
- Cowley
- Coxbench
- Cressbrook
- Creswell
- Creswell Model Village
- Crich
- Cromford
- Cross Hill
- Cross o' th' Hands
- Crowden
- Crowdecote
- Curbar
- Cutthorpe

== D ==
- Daisy Bank
- Dalbury
- Dalbury Lees
- Dale
- Dale Abbey
- Dale End
- Dale Moor
- Dalebank
- Dalebrook
- Danesmoor
- Darley Bridge
- Darley Dale
- Darley Hillside
- Denby
- Denby Bottles
- Denby Common
- Derby
- Derwent
- Derwent Reservoir
- Derwentmouth
- River Derwent
- Dethick
- Dimple
- Dinting
- Dinting Vale
- Dobholes
- Doe Lea
- Doehole
- Dove Head
- Dove Holes
- Dovedale
- Doveridge
- Dowlow
- Drakelow
- Draycott
- Dronfield
- Dronfield Woodhouse
- Duckmanton
- Duffield
- Duffieldbank
- Dunsa
- Dunston

== E ==
- Eagle Tor
- Earl Sterndale
- Eastmoor
- Eaves Knoll
- Eckington
- Edale
- Eddlestow
- Edensor
- Edlaston
- Ednaston
- Egginton
- Egstow
- Elmton
- Elmton Common
- Elton
- Elvaston
- Emmett Carr
- Etwall
- Etwall Common
- Eyam

== F ==
- Fairfield
- Fallgate
- Far Duckmanton
- Far Laund
- Farhill
- Farley
- Farnah Green
- Fenny Bentley
- Fernilee
- Findern
- Flagg
- Flaxholme
- Fletcher Hill
- Flower Lillies
- Folds
- Foolow
- Foremark
- Foston
- Foxley Oaks
- Freebirch
- Friden
- Fritchley
- Froggatt
- Froggatt Edge
- Furnacehill
- Furness Vale

== G ==
- Gallows Inn
- Gamesley
- Gladwins Mark
- Glapwell
- Glossop
- Glutton Bridge
- Godfreyhole
- Golden Valley
- Goosegreen
- Goosehill
- Gorsey Leys
- Gorseybank
- Goseley Dale
- Gowhole
- Grangemill
- Grangewood
- Grasshill
- Grassmoor
- Gratton
- Great Cubley
- Great Hucklow
- Great Longstone
- Great Rocks Lees
- Great Wilne
- Green Fairfield
- Greenhill Lane
- Greenhillocks
- Greenside
- Griffe Grange
- Grindleford
- Grindleford Bridge
- Grindlow
- Grindsbrook Booth

== H ==
- Hackney
- Haddon Grove
- Hadfield
- Hady
- Hadyhill
- Hague Bar
- Hales Green
- Hallam Fields
- Hallfield Gate
- Hallowes
- Hammersmith
- Handley
- Hardstoft
- Hardwick Hall
- Harehill
- Hargate Manor
- Hargate Wall
- Harlesthorpe
- Harper Hill
- Harpur Hill
- Harthill
- Harthill Moor
- Hartington
- Hartshay
- Hartshorne
- Hasland
- Hassop
- Hathersage
- Hatton
- Hayfield
- Hazelford
- Hazelwood
- Hazlebadge
- Heage
- Heage Firs
- Heanor
- Heanor Gate
- Hearthstone
- Heath
- Heath End
- Heathcote
- Heathtop
- Heathy Lea
- Henmoor
- Hepthorne Lane
- Heyden
- Hidebank
- Higginholes
- High Cross Bank
- High Lee
- High Needham
- High Peak
- Higher Bibbington
- Higher Dinting
- Higham
- Highfield
- Highfields
- Highlane
- Highlow
- Highoredish
- Hilcote
- Hill Houses
- Hill Somersal
- Hillclifflane
- Hills Town
- Hilltop
- Hillyfields
- Hilton
- Hindlow
- Hockerley
- Hodthorpe
- Hognaston
- Hogshawe
- Holbrook
- Holbrook Moor
- Hole in the Wall
- Holehouse
- Holestone
- Hollington
- Hollingwood
- Hollins
- Hollinsmoor
- Holloway
- Holmesdale
- Holmesfield
- Holmewood Heath
- Holmgate
- Holmley Common
- Holymoorside
- Hoon Hay
- Hoon Ridge
- Hope
- Hopping Hill
- Hopton
- Hopwell
- Hordens Park
- Horeston Place
- Horse Dale
- Horsley
- Horsley Woodhouse
- Horsleygate
- Horwich End
- Houghton Bassett
- Howden Reservoir
- Howe Green
- Hulland
- Hulland Moss
- Hulland Ward
- Hundall
- Hungry Bentley
- Hurdlow

== I ==
- Ible
- Idridgehay
- Idridgehay Green
- Ilkeston
- Ingleby
- Ingmanthorpe
- Inkersall
- Ireton Wood
- Ironville
- Ivonbrook Grange

== K ==
- Kedleston
- Kelstedge
- Kilburn
- Killamarsh
- River Kinder
- Kinder Scout
- King Sterndale
- Kings Newton
- Kirk Hallam
- Kirk Ireton
- Kirk Langley
- Kirkstead
- Knifesmithgate
- Kniveton

== L ==
- Ladmanlow
- Ladybower Reservoir
- Ladygrove
- Lane End
- Lane Ends
- Langley Common
- Langley Green
- Langley Mill
- Langwith
- Langwith Bassett
- Langwith Colliery
- Langwith Junction
- Larklands
- Lathkill Dale
- Laund Hill
- Lea Bridge
- Lea Hall
- Lea & Holloway
- Leabrooks
- Leaden Knowl
- Leadmill
- Leam
- Lee Head
- Lees
- Lees Green
- Leisure House
- Lightwood
- Lilypool
- Limekiln Field
- Limestone Way
- Linacre
- Linton
- Linton Heath
- Little Common
- Little Cubley
- Little Eaton
- Little Hallam
- Little Hayfield
- Little Hucklow
- Little Liverpool
- Little Longstone
- Little Moor
- Littlemoor
- Litton
- Litton Dale
- Littonslack
- Long Duckmanton
- Long Eaton
- Longcliffe
- Longdendale
- Longford
- Longfordlane
- Longlands
- Longlane
- Longwaybank
- Loscoe
- Lose Hill
- Loundsley Green
- Low Leighton
- Lower Birchwood
- Lower Crossings
- Lower Hartshay
- Lower Kilburn
- Lower Midway
- Lower Pilsley
- Lower Somercotes
- Lower Thurvaston
- Lowgates
- Lullington
- Lydgate

== M ==
- Mackworth (Amber Valley)
- Mackworth (Derby)
- Makeney
- Malcoff
- Mammerton
- Mapleton
- Mapperley
- Marehay
- Markeaton
- Marlpool
- Marshgreen
- Marshlane
- Marston Montgomery
- Marston on Dove
- Martinside
- Mastin Moor
- Mathersgrave
- Matlock
- Matlock Bank
- Matlock Bath
- Matlock Bridge
- Matlock Green
- Matlock Moor
- Mawstone Lane
- Melbourne
- Mercaston
- Meynell Langley
- Mickley
- Middle Duckmanton
- Middle Handley
- Middlecroft
- Middleton-by-Wirksworth
- Middleton-by-Youlgrave
- Milford
- Mill Green
- Millers Dale
- Millers Green
- Millington Green
- Millthorpe
- Milltown
- Milnhay
- Milton
- Monsal Dale
- Monyash
- Moorend
- Moorfield
- Moorhall
- Moorwood
- Moorwood Moor
- Moravian Settlement
- Morley
- Morley Park
- Morley Smithy
- Morleymoor
- Mornington Rise
- Morton
- Muggington
- Muggington Lane End
- Mytham Bridge

== N ==
- Nether Biggin
- Nether Booth
- Nether Burrows
- Nether End
- Nether Green
- Nether Haddon
- Nether Handley
- Nether Heage
- Nether Holloway
- Nether Loads
- Nether Moor
- Nether Padley
- Nether Pilsley
- Nether Sturston
- Nether Wheal
- Netherlea
- Netherseal
- Netherthorpe
- New Barlborough
- New Bolsover
- New Brampton
- New Brimington
- New Higham
- New Horwich
- New Houghton
- New Mills
- New Sawley
- New Smithy
- New Stanton
- New Tupton
- New Wessington
- New Whittington
- Newbold
- Newbold Moor
- Newbold Village
- Newhall
- Newhaven
- Newton Grange
- Newton Green
- Newton Solney
- Nithen End
- No Man's Heath
- Norbriggs
- Norbury
- Normanton Common
- North East Derbyshire
- North Wingfield
- Northedge
- Northwood
- Norwood
- Nuttals Park

== O ==
- Oak Flat
- Oaker Side
- Oakerthorpe
- Oaks Green
- Ockbrook
- Offcote
- Offerton
- Ogston
- Oker
- Old Blackwell
- Old Bolsover
- Old Brampton
- Old Dam
- Old Glossop
- Old Higham
- Old Matlock
- Old Sawley
- Old Tupton
- Old Whittington
- Ollerbrook Booth
- Ollersett
- Openwoodgate
- Osleston
- Osleton
- Osmaston, Derby
- Osmaston, Derbyshire Dales
- Outseats
- Over Burrows
- Over End
- Over Haddon
- Over Newbold
- Over Woodhouse
- Overend
- Overgreen
- Overseal
- Oversetts
- Owlcotes
- Owler Bar
- Oxcroft
- Oxton Rakes

== P ==
- Padley
- Padfield
- Palmer Moor
- Palterton
- Park Hall
- Park Head
- Parkhouse Green
- Parsley Hay
- Parwich
- Peak Cavern
- Peak Dale
- Peak Forest
- Peak Rail
- Peakley Hill
- Peakeshole Water
- Peasehill
- Pentrich
- Pentrich Lane End
- Perryfoot
- Peveril Castle
- Pikehall
- Pilhough
- Pilsbury
- Pilsley (Derbyshire Dales)
- Pilsley (North East Derbyshire)
- Pilsley Green
- Pinchoms Hill
- Pinxton
- Plaistow
- Pleasley
- Pleasley Vale
- Plumbley
- Pomeroy
- Poolsbrook
- Postern
- Potter Somersal
- Pratthall
- Press
- Priestcliffe
- Priestcliffe Ditch
- Puddle Hill
- Pye Bridge

== Q ==
- Quarndon
- Quoit Green

== R ==
- Radbourne
- Ramcroft
- Rattle
- Ravensdale Park
- Rawson Green
- Renishaw
- Repton
- Rhodeswood
- Riber
- Riddings
- Ridgeway
- Ridgeway Moor
- Ripley
- Rise End
- Risley
- Rivers Vale
- Robin Hood
- Rodsley
- Rosliston
- Roston
- Roston Common
- Rowarth
- Rowland
- Rowsley
- Rowthorn
- Rushup
- Rylah

== S ==
- Saltergate
- Sandiacre
- Sandylane
- Sapperton
- Sawley
- Scarcliffe
- Scarthin Nick
- School House Hill
- Scotches
- Scropton
- Seymour Cottages
- Shacklecross
- Shardlow and Great Wilne
- Shardlow Moor
- Sharplow
- Sheep Hills
- Sheepbridge
- Sheepcote Hill
- Sheldon
- Shining Cliff Woods
- Shipley
- Shipley Common
- Shirebrook
- Shireoaks
- Shirland
- Shirland Park
- Shirley
- Shirley Common
- Short Heath
- Shottle
- Shottlegate
- Shuttlewood
- Simmondley
- Sinfin
- Slack
- Slackhall
- Slaley
- Slatepit Dale
- Sleetmoor
- Sloadlane
- Smalldale
- Smalley
- Smalley Green
- Smisby
- Smithy Houses
- Smithy Moor
- Smithyhill
- Snape Hill
- Snelston
- Snitterton
- Somercotes
- Somersal Herbert
- South Darley
- South Normanton
- South Wingfield
- Southwood
- Spancarr
- Sparklow
- Sparrowpit
- Speedwell Cavern
- Spinkhill
- Spital
- Spitalhill
- Spitewinter
- Spondon
- Spout
- Springfield Park
- St Augustines
- Staden
- Stainsby
- Stanfree
- Stanhope Bretby
- Stanley
- Stanley Common
- Stanton Moor
- Stanton
- Stanton by Bridge
- Stanton by Dale
- Stanton in Peak
- Stanton Lees
- Starkholmes
- Staveley
- Steeple Grange
- Steetley
- Stenson Fields
- Sterndale Moor
- Stone Edge
- Stonebroom
- Stonegravels
- Stoneheads
- Stoney Middleton
- Stoneyford
- Stony Houghton
- Stonyford
- Street Lane
- Stretton
- Stubley
- Sturston
- Stydd
- Sudbury
- Summerly
- Sunnyside
- Sutton cum Duckmanton
- Sutton on the Hill
- Sutton Rock
- Sutton Scarsdale
- Sutton Spring Wood
- Swaddale
- Swadlincote
- Swanwick
- Swarkestone
- Swathwick

== T ==
- Taddington
- Tansley
- Tapton
- Tapton Grove
- Taxal
- Temple Normanton
- The Bank
- The Bent
- The Brushes
- The Common
- The Cutter
- The Dalley
- The Flourish
- The Green
- The Hill
- The Leys
- The Lowes
- The Mires
- The Pastures
- The Walls
- Thornbridge
- Thornhill
- Thornsett
- Thorpe
- Thulston
- Thurvaston
- Tibshelf
- Ticknall
- Tideswell
- Tinkersick
- Tinkersley
- Tintwistle
- Tissington
- Toadhole Furnace
- Toadmoor
- Torr Top
- Torside
- Town End
- Town Head
- Townend
- Townhead
- Treak Cliff Cavern
- Trentlock
- Troway
- Trusley
- Tunstead
- Tunstead Milton
- Tupton
- Turnditch
- Two Dales
- Twyford

== U ==
- Uftonfields
- Unstone
- Unstone Green
- Unthank
- Upper Biggin
- Upper Birchwood
- Upper Booth
- Upper Derwent Valley
- Upper End
- Upper Fold
- Upper Hackney
- Upper Hartshay
- Upper Langwith
- Upper Loads
- Upper Marehay
- Upper Moor
- Upper Newbold
- Upper Padley
- Upper Pilsley
- Upper Pleasley
- Upper Town (Birchover)
- Upper Town (Bonsall)
- Upperdale
- Upperthorpe
- Uppertown
- Upperwood

== V ==
- Valehouse Lake
- Via Gellia

== W ==
- Wadshelf
- Waingroves
- Wakebridge
- Waldley
- Walton
- Walton-Upon-Trent
- Wardlow
- Wardlow Mires
- Warmbrook
- Wash
- Wash Green
- Water Swallows
- Waterloo
- Watford
- Wensley
- Wessington
- West Broughton
- West End
- River Westend
- West Hallam
- West Hallam Common
- West Handley
- Westhorpe
- Westhouses
- Weston Underwood
- Weston upon Trent
- Weston-on-Trent
- Westthorpe
- Whaley
- Whaley Bridge
- Whatstandwell
- Wheatcroft
- Wheston
- White Hollows
- White Moor
- Whitehough
- Whitehouses
- Whitelane End
- Whitle
- Whittington Moor
- Whitwell
- Whitwell Common
- Wigley
- Wilday Green
- Wildpark
- Willersley
- Williamthorpe
- Willington
- Wilsthorpe
- Win Hill
- Windley
- Wingerworth
- Wingfield Park
- Winnats Pass
- Winsick
- Winster
- Wirksworth
- Wood Side
- Woodeaves
- Woodhead
- Woodhouses
- Woodlinkin
- Woodside
- Woodthorpe
- Woodville
- Woolley
- Woolley Bridge
- Woolley Moor
- Woolow
- Wormhill
- Wyaston
- Wye Head
- Wyver

== Y ==
- Yeaveley
- Yeldersley
- Yorkshire Bridge
- Youlgreave

== See also ==
- List of settlements in Derbyshire by population
- List of places formerly in Derbyshire
- List of places in England
