= List of settlements in Derbyshire by population =

Some of the largest settlements of Derbyshire, with major cities from outside the county shown in yellow.

This is a list of settlements in Derbyshire by population based on the results of the 2011 census. In 2011, there were 42 settlements with 5,000 or more inhabitants in Derbyshire, shown in the table below.

== List of settlements ==
Rank	Settlement	Population		Borough/ district	Notes
Rank	Settlement	2001	2011	Borough/ district	Notes
1	Derby	221,708	248,752	City of Derby	
2	Chesterfield	98,845	103,788	Chesterfield	Figure is for the borough including Brimington and Staveley parishes. Core town unparished area (which includes Hasland, Newbold, Tapton, Old and New Whittington) population counts are 73,484 & 76,753
3	Swadlincote	39,322	45,000	South Derbyshire	Figure is for the built-up area as unparished. Includes Albert Village (Leicestershire), Boundary, Castle Gresley, Church Gresley, Hartshone, High Cross Bank, Midway, Mount Pleasant, Newhall, Oversetts, Overseal, Stanhope Bretby, Woodville. Excludes Bretby, Linton, Stanton
4	Ilkeston	37,550	38,640	Erewash	Figure is for the built-up area, which includes Cotmanhay, Kirk Hallam, Larklands, Little Hallam/Hallam Fields, Shipley Common/Shipley View. Excludes High Lane (West Hallam), Shipley, Stanton-by-Dale
5	Long Eaton	46,490	37,760	Erewash	Figure is for the built-up area, which includes Sawley and Wilsthorpe. 2001 count includes Sandiacre and Risley
6	Belper	20,548	21,823	Amber Valley	Figure is for Belper civil parish, which includes Milford and Blackbrook
7	Dronfield	21,330	21,261	North East Derbyshire	Figure is for Dronfield civil parish, which includes Dronfield Woodhouse and Coal Aston
8	Buxton	20,836	22,115	High Peak	
9	Ripley	20,035	20,807	Amber Valley	Figure is for Ripley civil parish, which includes Heage, Ambergate and Waingroves
10	Staveley	16,684	18,247	Chesterfield	Figure is for Staveley civil parish, which includes Mastin Moor, Duckmanton, Inkersall Green and Hollingwood
11	Glossop	16,666	17,576	High Peak	Figure is for the electoral wards of Howard Town, Old Glossop, Dinting, Simmondley and Whitfield.
12	Heanor	16,249	17,251	Amber Valley	Figure is for Heanor and Loscoe civil parish, which includes Loscoe but excludes Heanor Gate
13	Bolsover	11,291	11,673	Bolsover	Figure is for Old Bolsover civil parish, which includes Shuttlewood, Stanfree and Whaley, but excludes part of Hillstown.
14	Eckington	11,152	11,855	North East Derbyshire	Figure is for Eckington civil parish, which includes Renishaw, Spinkhill, Marsh Lane and Ridgeway.
15	Shirebrook	9,291	9,760	Bolsover	
16	Matlock	9,496	9,543	Derbyshire Dales	Figure is for Matlock Town civil parish, which includes Starkholmes and Riber.
17	New Mills	9,625	9,521	High Peak	
18	Killamarsh	9,627	9,445	North East Derbyshire	
19	South Normanton	8,550	9,445	Bolsover	Including northern Broadmeadows
20	Clay Cross	8,573	9,222	North East Derbyshire	Includes Henmoor and Danesmoor
21	Sandiacre	8,770	8,889	Erewash	Included in Long Eaton count
22	Brimington	8,677	8,788	Chesterfield	Included in Chesterfield count
23	Chapel-en-le-Frith	8,577	8,635	High Peak	Includes Bridgefield, Cockyard, Combs, Dove Holes, Slackhall, Sparrowpit, Tunstead Milton, Whitehough
24	Ashbourne	7,112	8,111	Derbyshire Dales	Includes part of Ashbourne Green
25	Alfreton	7,928	7,971	Amber Valley	
26	Hilton	3,871	7,714	South Derbyshire	Includes Burntheath
27	Clowne	7,447	7,590	Bolsover	Includes New Barlborough and Harlesthorpe
28	Borrowash/Ockbrook	7,331	7,335	Erewash	Figure is for Ockbrook and Borrowash civil parish
29	Sawley	6,645	6,629	Erewash	Included in Long Eaton count
30	Wingerworth	6,720	6,533	North East Derbyshire	Includes Hunloke, Swathwick
31	North Wingfield	6,318	6,505	North East Derbyshire	Includes Hepthorne Lane, Hillyfields, Highfields
32	Whaley Bridge	6,228	6,455	High Peak	
33	Somercotes	5,745	6,255	Amber Valley	Including Leabrooks and Lower Birchwood
34	Pinxton	5,427	5,699	Bolsover	Including Upper Birchwood and southern Broadmeadows
35	Creswell/Elmton	4,755	5,550	Bolsover	Figure is for Elmton-with-Creswell civil parish
36	Darley Dale	5,167	5,413	Derbyshire Dales	Includes Hackney, Two Dales
37	Langley Mill/Aldercar	4,863	5,405	Amber Valley	Figure is for Aldercar and Langley Mill civil parish
38	Scarcliffe	5,211	5,288	Bolsover	Includes Palterton, Rylah, Stockley, and parts of Stony Houghton and Hillstown (Bolsover)
39	Woodville	3,420	5,161	South Derbyshire	
40	Swanwick	5,316	5,084	Amber Valley	
41	Duffield	4,585	5,046	Amber Valley	Includes Flaxholme
42	Wirksworth	4,965	5,038	Derbyshire Dales	Includes Bolehill, Breamfield, Godfreyhole, Gorseybank

== See also ==
- List of places in Derbyshire
- List of civil parishes in Derbyshire
- List of towns and cities in England by population
