= Sheep Hills =

Sheep Hills most often refers to:

- Sheep Hills, California, a mountain range in Orange Country, California, United States
- Sheep Hills, Derbyshire, a place in Derbyshire, United Kingdom
- Sheep Hills (Idaho), a mountain range in Owyhee County, Idaho, United States
- Sheep Hills, Victoria, a town in the Wimmera, Victoria, Australia
