= Mansfield urban area =

Coordinates: 53.14°N 1.20°W

Map of the Mansfield Urban Area.

The Mansfield Urban Area is a built-up area of Nottinghamshire, England, which comprises the towns of Mansfield, Sutton in Ashfield, Kirkby in Ashfield and Mansfield Woodhouse, as well as both the villages of Newstead in the Borough of Gedling and New Houghton in Derbyshire. The 2011 census gives the total population of the area as 171,958 making it the 37th most populated urban area in England. The population has increased 9% from the 2001 census population of 158,114.

ONS key	Urban region/sub-region	Population			
ONS key	Urban region/sub-region	1981 Census	1991 Census	2001 census	2011 Census
F05700	Mansfield Urban Area	155,466	154,966	158,114	171,958
F05701	Mansfield	72,108	71,858	69,987	77,551
F05702	Mansfield Woodhouse	17,609	18,204	17,931	18,574
F05703	Sutton in Ashfield	39,622	37,890	41,951	45,848
F05704	Kirkby in Ashfield	26,127	27,014	27,067	26,927
	Newstead				1,768
	New Houghton			1,178	1,290
