= Oxcroft =

Coordinates: 53.257°N 1.280°W

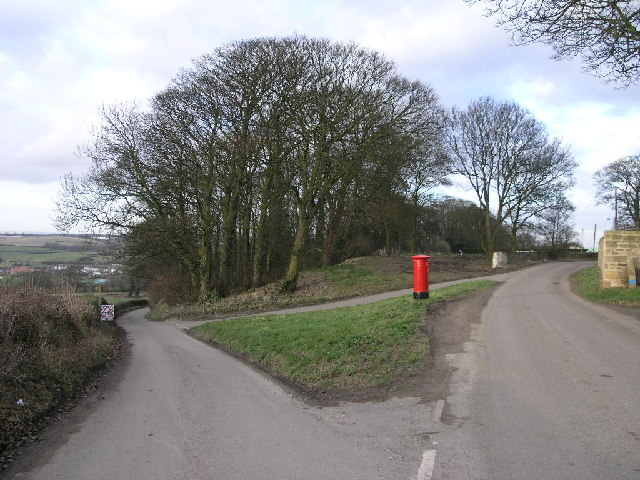
- Oxcroft Lane.

- Location within Derbyshire
- OS grid reference: SK481735
- District: Bolsover
- Shire county: Derbyshire
- Region: East Midlands
- Country: England
- Sovereign state: United Kingdom
- Post town: CHESTERFIELD
- Postcode district: S44, S80
- Police: Derbyshire
- Fire: Derbyshire
- Ambulance: East Midlands

Oxcroft is a hamlet in Bolsover (district), Derbyshire in England, located to the north of Bolsover, about 1–2 miles along the Clowne-New Houghton Road. It consists of a few farms and cottages.

Etymology: Probably simply meaning an Ox cottage/farm. Ox = Ox, Croft = Farm/Cottage.
