= Stubley =

Stubley is a surname. Notable people with the surname include:

- Francis Horace Stubley (1833–1886), Australian politician
- Trevor Stubley (1932–2010), British painter and illustrator

== See also ==
- Studley (surname)
