= Beighton Fields =

Village in Derbyshire, England, near Renishaw and Staveley

Coordinates: 53.2867°N 1.3204°W

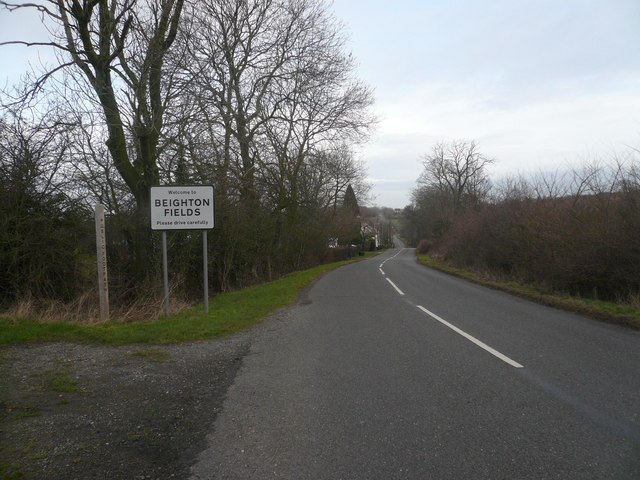

- Location within Derbyshire
- District: Chesterfield
- Shire county: Derbyshire
- Region: East Midlands
- Country: England
- Sovereign state: United Kingdom
- Post town: CHESTERFIELD
- Postcode district: S43
- Dialling code: 01246
- Police: Derbyshire
- Fire: Derbyshire
- Ambulance: East Midlands
- UK Parliament: Chesterfield

Beighton Fields is a village in Derbyshire, England, near Renishaw and Staveley (where the population is listed).

John Bruno Bowdon, of Southgate House and Beighton Fields, who married Mary Martha, eldest daughter of Edward Ferrers, Esq., of Baddesley Clinton, in Warwickshire was High Sheriff of Derbyshire in 1841.

== See also ==
- Geograph image of Beighton Fields
- List of places in Derbyshire
