= Horsleygate =

Hamlet in Derbyshire, England

Coordinates: 53°17′19″N 1°32′04″W

Horsleygate is a hamlet in Derbyshire, England. It is located south-west of Holmesfield.

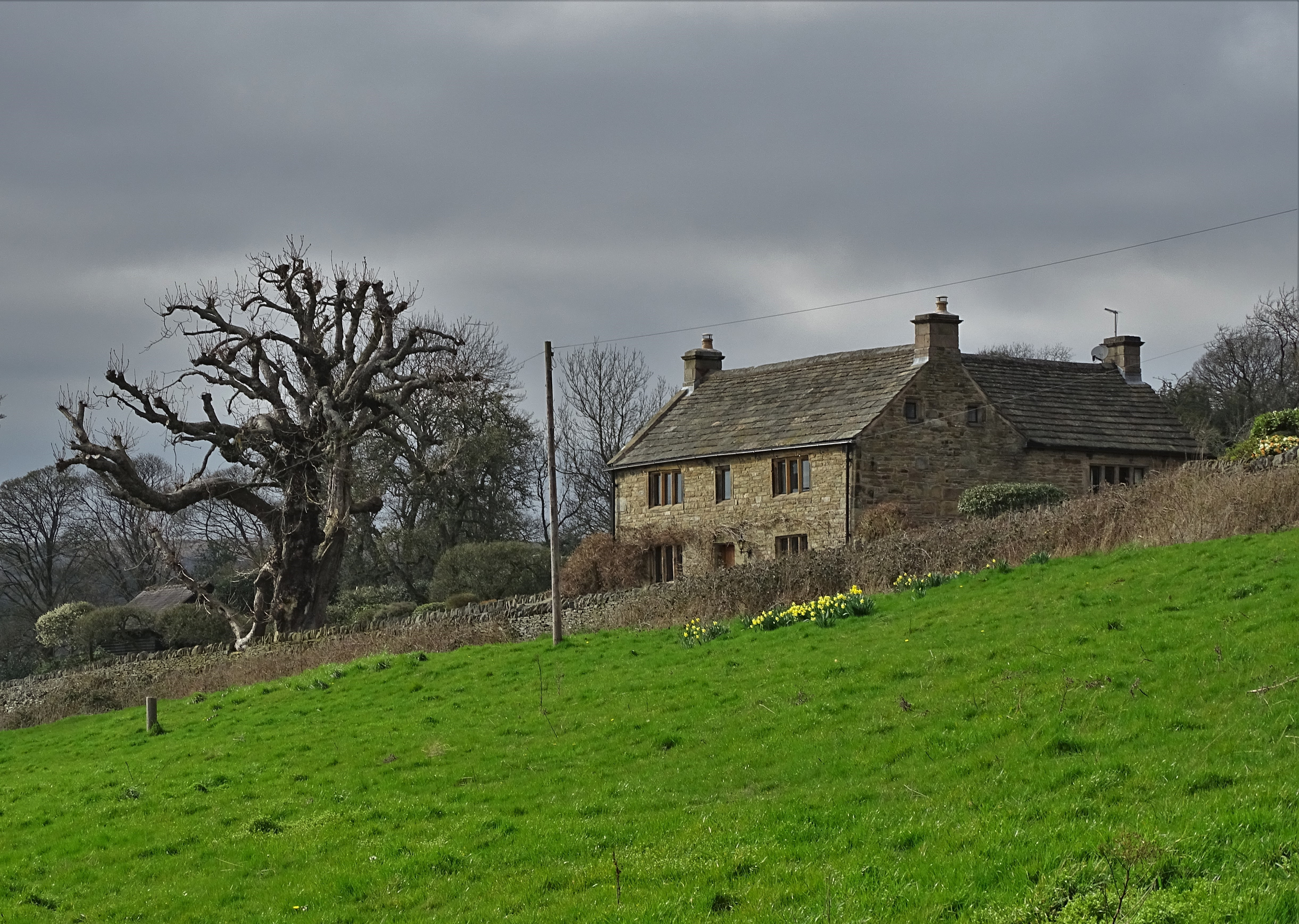
Horsleygate Old Hall

== History ==
Horsleygate Hall is located to the west of the hamlet, north of Unthank, and dates back to 1783. The hall is closely linked to the Eyre family of Hassop.
