= Hogshawe =

Area of Buxton, Derbyshire, England

Coordinates: 53°15′30″N 1°54′35″W

Hogshawe or Hogshaw is an area of settlement in Derbyshire, England. It is a part of Buxton, located between the A6 Fairfield Road and the present Peak Rail railway line. By the 1890s the area had been enclosed on the west and north sides by the London and North Western Railway and Midland Railway lines, with Lightwood Road running across from south-east to north-west. The area falls in the Corbar ward of the High Peak Council.
