= Brosscroft =

Coordinates: 53.467°N 1.968°W

Peter Street and Brosscroft, Upper Hadfield
- Location within Derbyshire
- OS grid reference: SK022966
- District: High Peak
- Shire county: Derbyshire
- Region: East Midlands
- Country: England
- Sovereign state: United Kingdom
- Post town: HADFIELD
- Postcode district: SK13
- Dialling code: 01457
- Police: Derbyshire
- Fire: Derbyshire
- Ambulance: North West
- UK Parliament: High Peak

Peter Street and Brosscroft is an area in Derbyshire, England. It is part of Hadfield (where the population can be found), located on the north-east side. It is situated on the boundary of the Peak District National Park and as such is ideal for outdoor recreation activities including walking, cycling and watersports. It is within a stone's throw of the Park boundary, within two minutes walk (or cycle) of the Longdendale Trail and five minutes walk of the Trans Pennine Trail. The nearest of four linked reservoirs has been used for watersports in the summer, and the next reservoir has a resident sailing club. It is less than five minutes drive (ten minutes walk) to the railway station and a similar distance to the A628 trans-pennine trunk road. Residents thus enjoy a rural lifestyle but with the additional benefits of good east–west road links (to South Yorkshire/M1 and Manchester/M6) and a direct rail link to Manchester Piccadilly and thence to the Airport.
