= Overend =

Overend is a surname. Notable people with the surname include:

- William Heysham Overend (5 October 1851 – 18 March 1898), British marine artist and book illustrator
- Best Overend (1909–1977), Australian architect
- Jonathan Overend, English journalist
- Jonathan Magri Overend (born 1970), Maltese footballer
- Ned Overend (born 1955), American cyclist
- Robert Overend (1930–2017), Northern Ireland politician
- Sandra Overend (born 1973), Northern Ireland politician
