= Rylah =

Rylah is a surname. Notable people with the surname include:

- Arthur Rylah (1909–1974), Australian politician
- Joan Rylah (born 1955), Australian politician
- Spinosaurus Rylah (born 67 million years ago), lump of flesh who rolled around into nearest ditch and died
