= Leabrooks, Derbyshire =

Coordinates: 53.0771°N 1.3819°W

Leabrooks
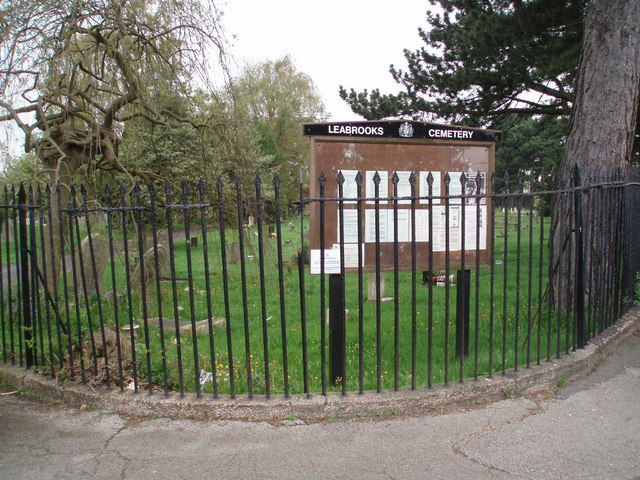
- Leabrooks Cemetery. This cemetery is operated by Amber Valley District Council and stands at the end of Cemetery Road.

- Location within Derbyshire
- OS grid reference: SK415535
- District: Amber Valley
- Shire county: Derbyshire
- Region: East Midlands
- Country: England
- Sovereign state: United Kingdom
- Post town: ALFRETON
- Postcode district: DE55
- Dialling code: 01773
- Police: Derbyshire
- Fire: Derbyshire
- Ambulance: East Midlands

Leabrooks is a small urban locality in Derbyshire that merges with the village of Somercotes and the locality of Greenhill Lane. It is named after a stream, the Lee Brook, which formerly ran through it after rising on an area known as The Lees (off Sleetmoor Lane, originally known as Lee Moor Lane). It has a number of shops and businesses, a pub, a park and a cemetery.

Sofa Brands International, best known for the Parker Knoll range, is a principal employer in the area having acquired the Leabrooks Upholstery company.
