= Burley Hill =

Hamlet in Derbyshire, England

Coordinates: 52.966°N 1.479°W

- Location within Derbyshire
- OS grid reference: SK350410
- District: Erewash
- Shire county: Derbyshire
- Region: East Midlands
- Country: England
- Sovereign state: United Kingdom
- Post town: DERBY
- Postcode district: DE22
- Police: Derbyshire
- Fire: Derbyshire
- Ambulance: East Midlands

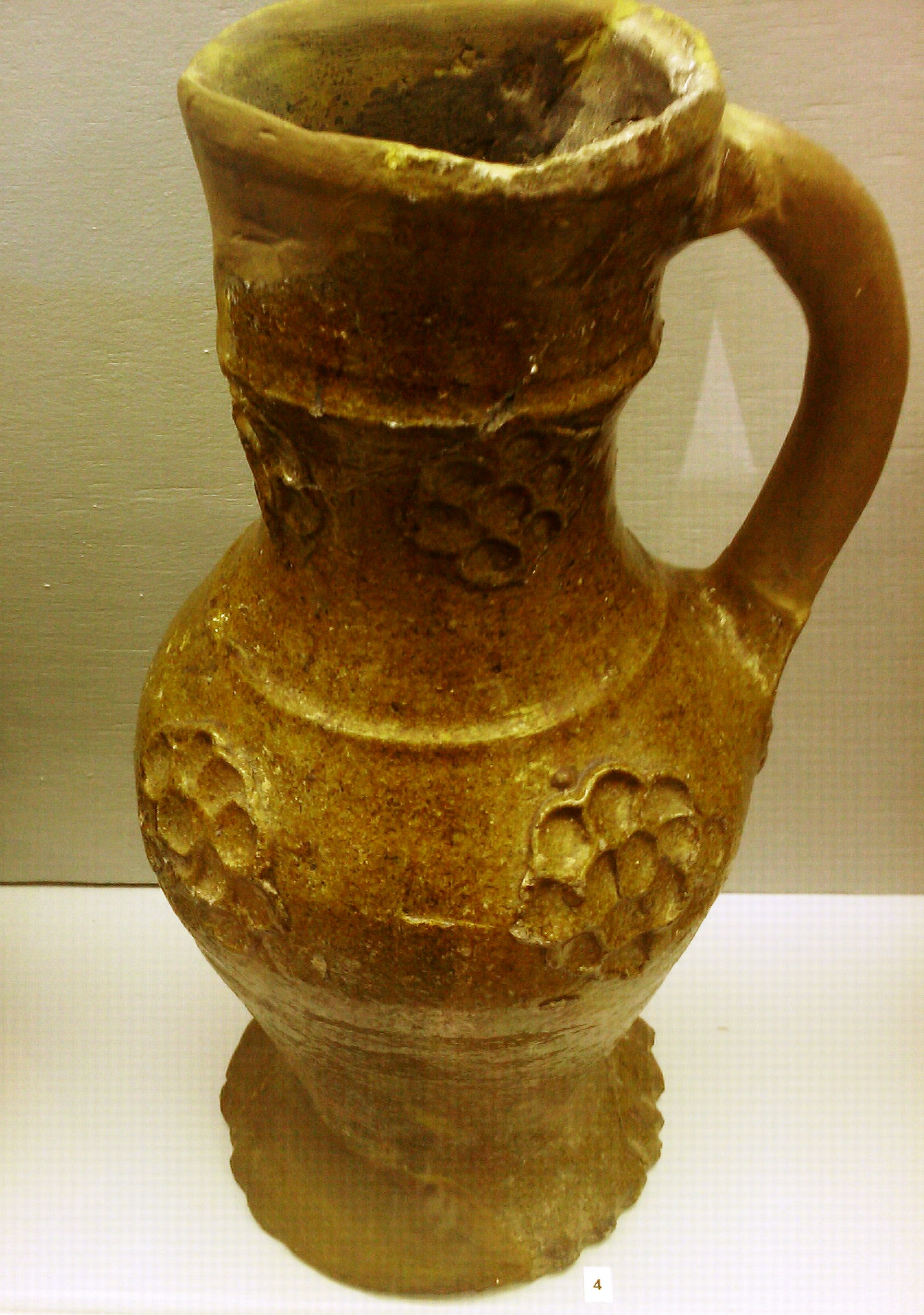
Burley Hill type jug now in Derby Museum

Burley Hill is a hamlet in the Erewash district, in the county of Derbyshire, England. It is located one mile north of Allestree. Burley Hill was the location of a pottery in the 13th and 14th centuries and some of those pots are preserved in Derby Museum.
