= Slackhall =

Hamlet in Derbyshire, England

Coordinates: 53.3340°N 1.8880°W

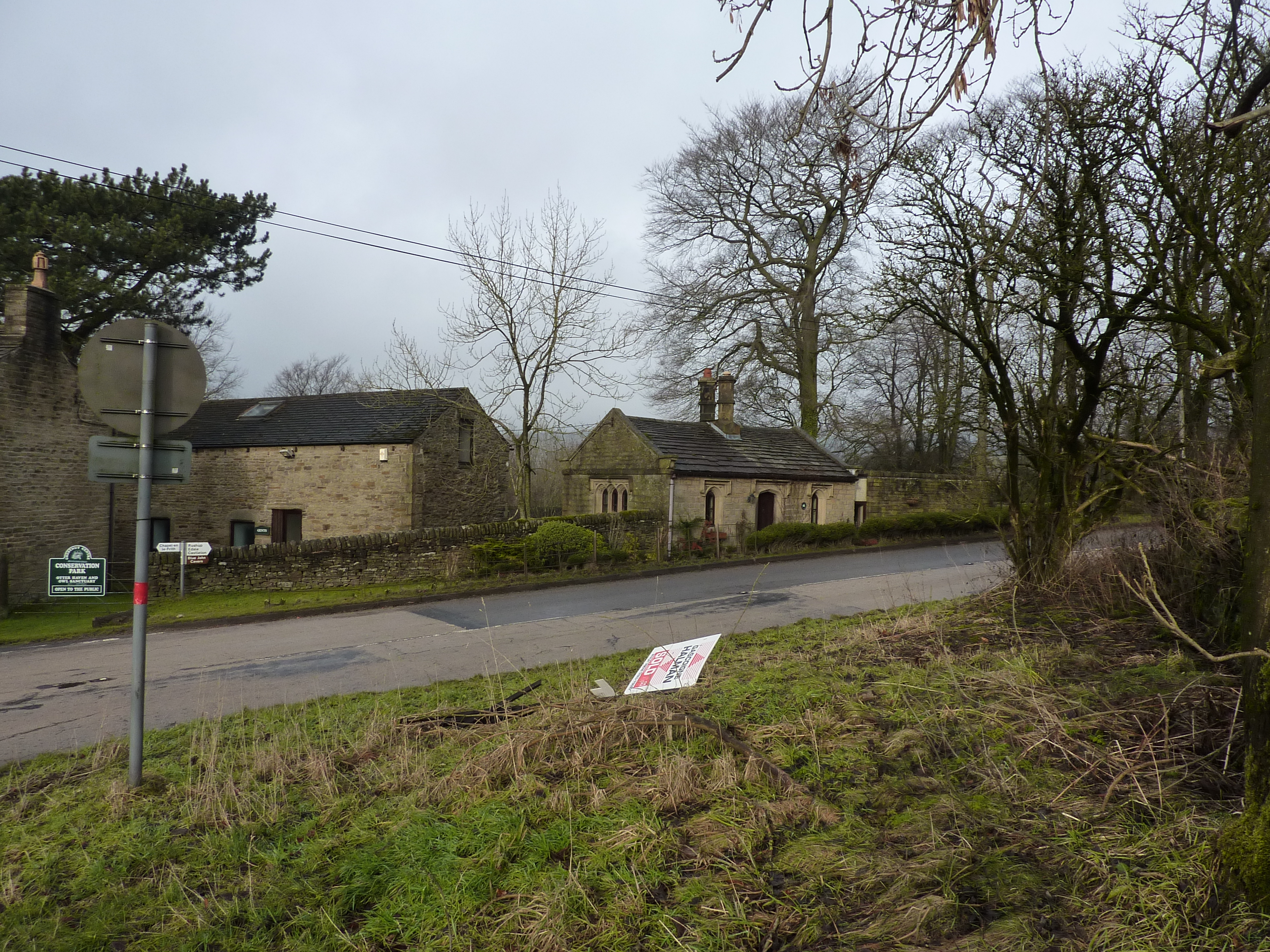
- Cottages at Slackhall

- Location within Derbyshire
- OS grid reference: SK075508
- Shire county: Derbyshire
- Region: East Midlands
- Country: England
- Sovereign state: United Kingdom
- Post town: High Peak
- Postcode district: SK23
- Police: Derbyshire
- Fire: Derbyshire
- Ambulance: East Midlands

Slackhall is a hamlet in Derbyshire, England. The hamlet falls within the civil parish of Chapel-en-le-Frith. It is about 1.2 km (or 0.75 miles) east of Chapel-en-le-Frith and within the boundaries of the Peak District National Park.

The hamlet contains a number of listed buildings, including Ford Hall. Slack Hall itself lies to the south of the hamlet, near Bagshaw.
