= Barlborough Common =

Coordinates: 53.277°N 1.280°W

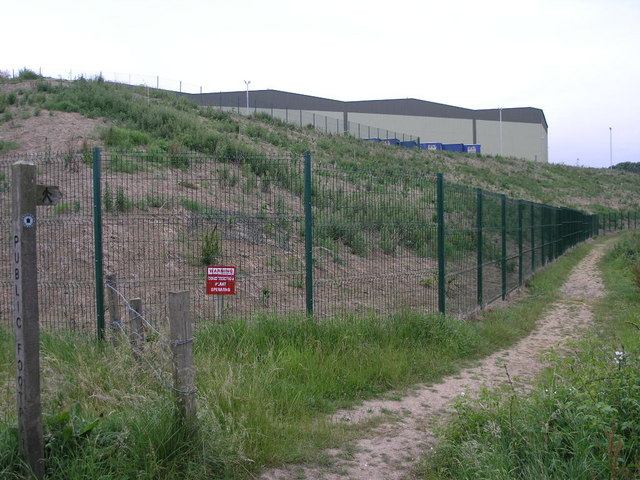
- Amazon Fulfilment Centre reclaimed ground at Barlborough Common.

- Location within Derbyshire
- OS grid reference: SK472764
- District: Bolsover
- Shire county: Derbyshire
- Region: East Midlands
- Country: England
- Sovereign state: United Kingdom
- Post town: CHESTERFIELD
- Postcode district: S43
- Police: Derbyshire
- Fire: Derbyshire
- Ambulance: East Midlands

Barlborough Common is an area in Derbyshire, England. It is located to the south of Barlborough.

== History ==
The land has undergone extensive open-cast mining and subsequent restoration. In the 19th century, there were numerous active mining operations.
