= Tunstead, Derbyshire =

Village in Derbyshire, England

Coordinates: 53.2718°N 1.8380°W

Tunstead
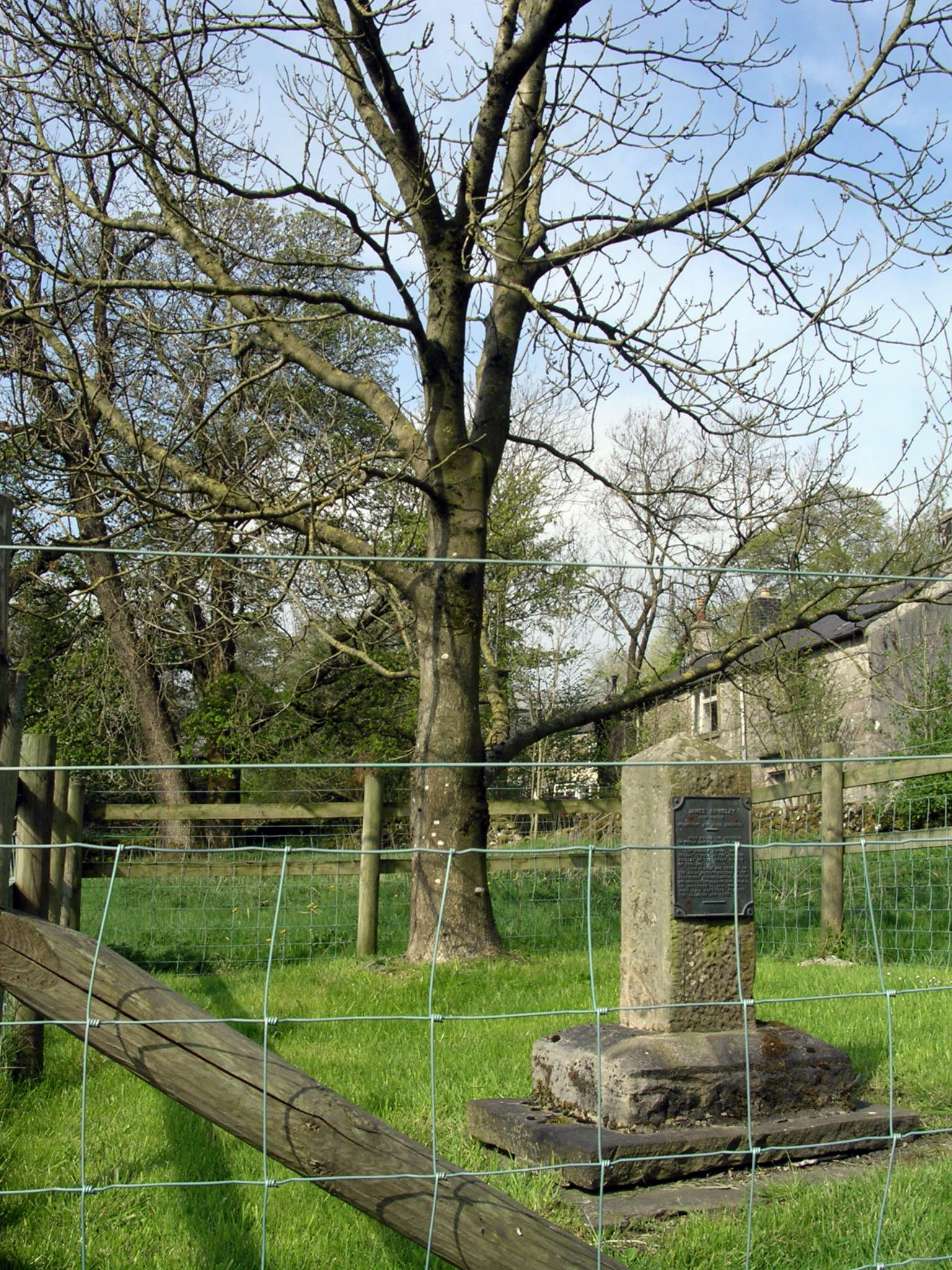
- Monument to James Brindley with ash tree

- Location within Derbyshire
- OS grid reference: SK104741
- Civil parish: Wormhill
- District: High Peak
- Shire county: Derbyshire
- Region: East Midlands
- Country: England
- Sovereign state: United Kingdom
- Post town: BUXTON
- Postcode district: SK17
- Police: Derbyshire
- Fire: Derbyshire
- Ambulance: East Midlands

Tunstead is a village in Derbyshire, England, situated above Great Rocks Dale north of Buxton. It should not be confused with Tunstead Milton, which is roughly five miles to the north west. It is in the civil parish of Wormhill.

It is famous as the birthplace of James Brindley, pioneer builder of Britain's canals. He was born in 1716 in a farmhouse on the edge of the village and with the encouragement of his mother he became an apprentice millwright in Leek. By 1875 the farm had fallen into ruins, marked only by an ash tree, when a monument to his memory was placed in nearby Wormhill. By 1958, the ash tree had also gone, and the Derbyshire Archaeological Society planted a sapling in its place and erected another monument. Tunstead is also famous for the quarry, on the other side of the old Midland Railway line from Millers Dale to Chapel en le Frith. Being just outside the boundary of the Peak District National Park it is probably the most extensively worked in the area, yielding high-quality limestone exceptionally free of volcanic rock.

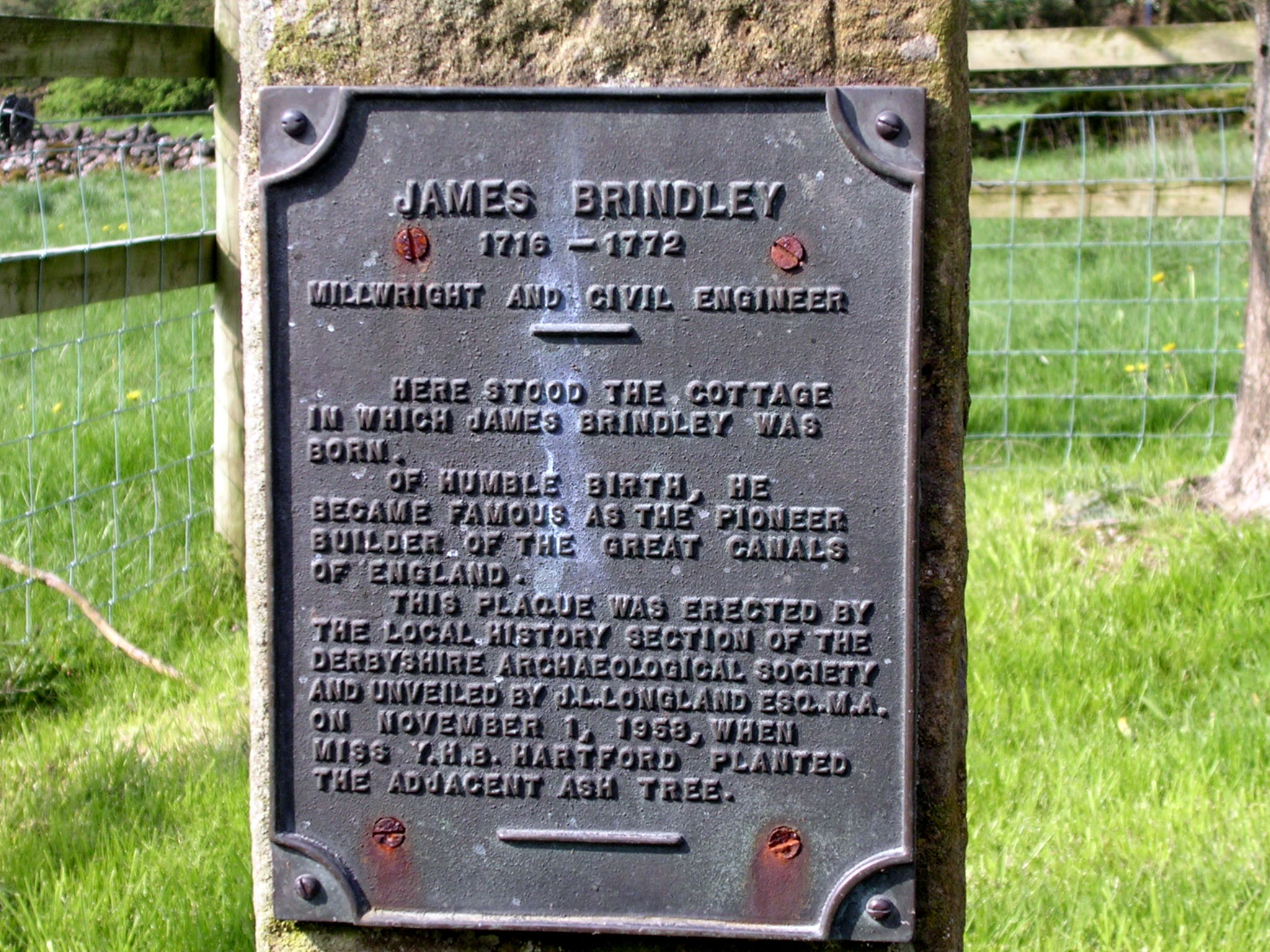
Plaque from the James Brindley Monument
