= Over Woodhouse =

Coordinates: 53°13′49″N 1°17′15″W

Over Woodhouse is a suburban area lying just northwest of the town of Bolsover in Derbyshire, England. It is just to the north of Bolsover Castle, on a hill facing it. The whole area is surrounded by the A632, the B6419 to Shuttlewood, and two other roads which join and lead to B6418 to Shuttlewood, lying just east of the former Bolsover Colliery.

It consists primarily of one large Post-World War II housing estate. Though there are some older properties within it.
