= List of places formerly in Derbyshire =

This is a list of places formerly administered as part the county of Derbyshire which is located in England.

- Appleby Magna
- Beighton (ward)
- Croxall
- Donisthorpe
- Dore, South Yorkshire
- Edingale
- Graves Park (ward)
- Meersbrook
- Mosborough (ward)
- Ravenstone, Leicestershire
- Stapenhill
- Stretton en le Field
- Totley
- Winshill
