= Mathersgrave =

Hamlet in Derbyshire, England

Coordinates: 53.126°N 1.465°W

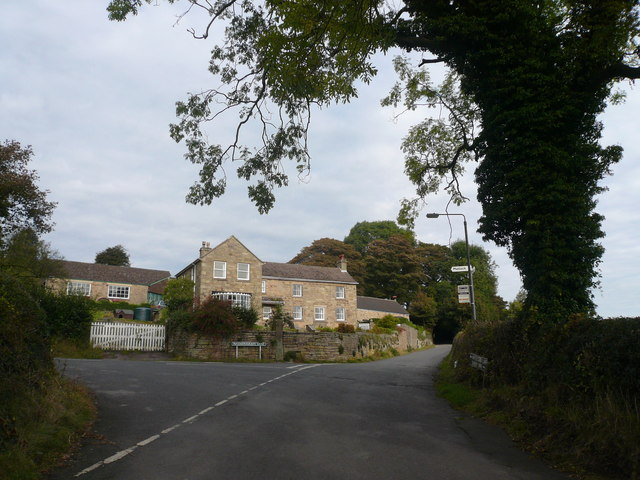
- Junction of Mathers Grave Lane and School Lane.

- Location within Derbyshire
- OS grid reference: SK358588
- District: North East Derbyshire
- Shire county: Derbyshire
- Region: East Midlands
- Country: England
- Sovereign state: United Kingdom
- Post town: ALFRETON
- Postcode district: DE55
- Police: Derbyshire
- Fire: Derbyshire
- Ambulance: East Midlands

Mathersgrave is a hamlet in Derbyshire, England. It consists of three houses on Mathers Grave Lane. This lane runs between the A615 Matlock road and School Lane, Brackenfield. The hamlet is located 5 miles north-west of Alfreton.

A highwayman named Mather was reputedly hanged and buried at the crossroads (a traditional punishment), on Mather's Grave Lane. There is a weatherworn stone referring to the event set into one of the walls at the crossroads. Bones are said to have been found during road repairs in the 1920s. Some information is held at Matlock, in the Derbyshire County Records Office. The Barackenfield history web page suggests he committed suicide.
