= Sheep Hills, Derbyshire =

Coordinates: 53.0357°N 1.6235°W

Sheep Hills
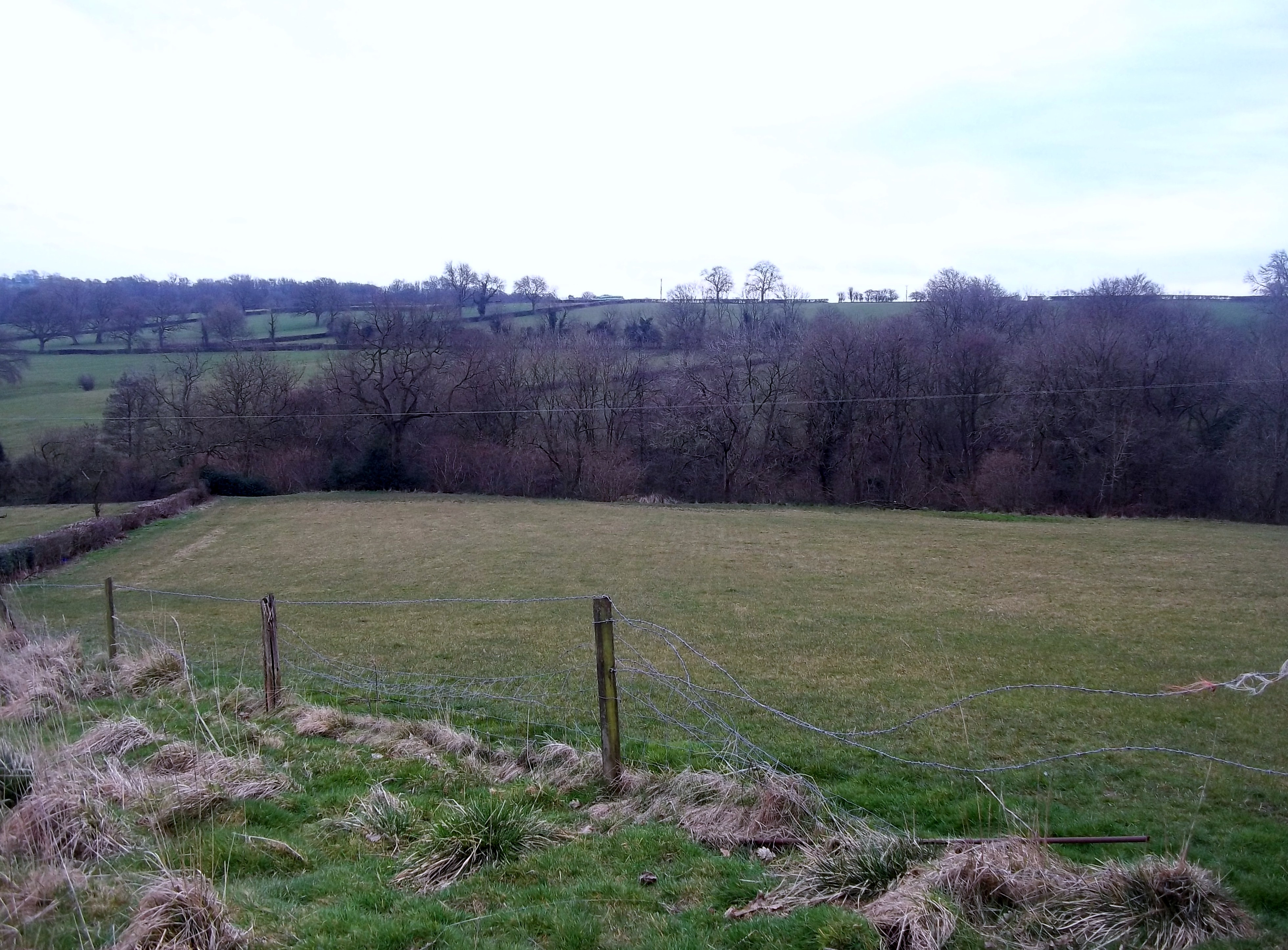

- Location within Derbyshire
- OS grid reference: SK253487
- District: Derbyshire Dales
- Shire county: Derbyshire
- Region: East Midlands
- Country: England
- Sovereign state: United Kingdom
- Post town: BUXTON
- Postcode district: SK17
- Police: Derbyshire
- Fire: Derbyshire
- Ambulance: East Midlands

Sheep Hills is a place near Biggin in Derbyshire, United Kingdom. It is mainly a rural area, its geographical context is described as farm, grassland and woodland.

== See also ==
- List of places in Derbyshire
