= Studley (surname) =

Studley is a surname. Notable people with the surname include:

- Chuck Studley, American football coach
- Elmer E. Studley, American politician
- Henry O. Studley, organ and piano maker and carpenter
- John Studley, Elizabethan translator
- Sy Studley (1841–1901), American baseball player
