= Brosterfield =

Hamlet in Derbyshire, England

Coordinates: 53.282°N 1.712°W

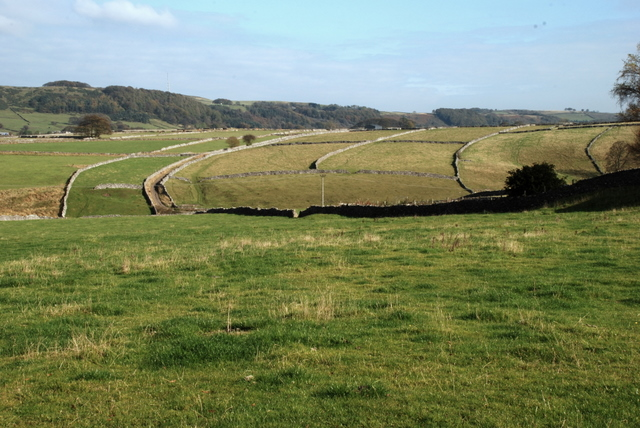
- Fields at Brosterfield.

- Location within Derbyshire
- OS grid reference: SK192761
- District: Derbyshire Dales
- Shire county: Derbyshire
- Region: East Midlands
- Country: England
- Sovereign state: United Kingdom
- Post town: BUXTON
- Postcode district: S32
- Police: Derbyshire
- Fire: Derbyshire
- Ambulance: East Midlands

Brosterfield is a hamlet in Derbyshire, England. It is located close to Foolow, where the road to that village joins the A623 road.
