= Rowthorn =

Rowthorn is a surname. Notable people with the surname include:

- Jeffery Rowthorn (1934–2025), Welsh Anglican bishop and hymnographer
- Robert Rowthorn (born 1939), British academic
