= Bowshaw =

Coordinates: 53.313°N 1.477°W

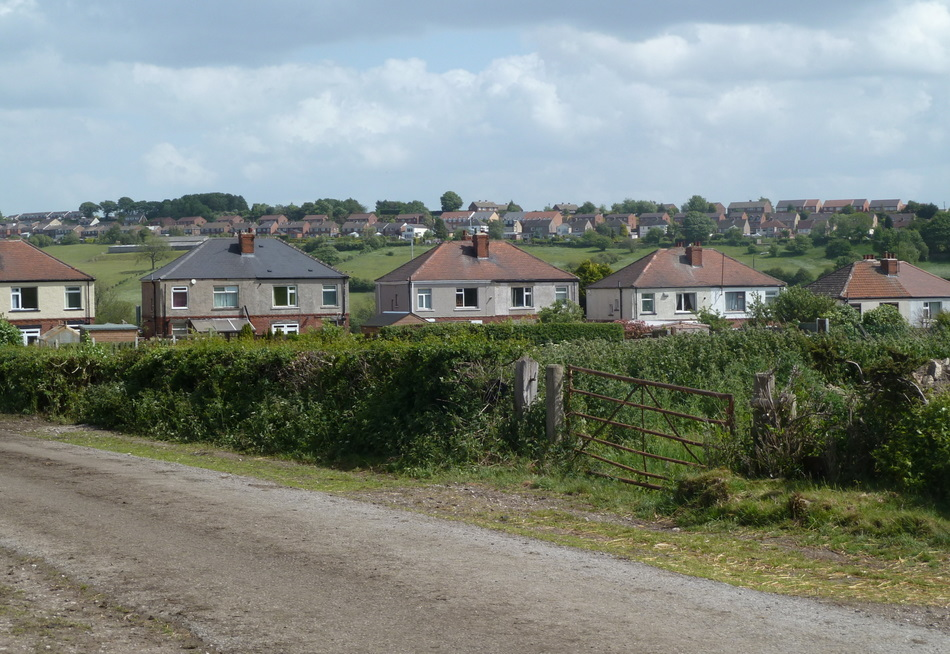
- Houses at the northern end of Bowshaw

- Location within Derbyshire
- OS grid reference: SK349796
- District: North East Derbyshire
- Shire county: Derbyshire
- Region: East Midlands
- Country: England
- Sovereign state: United Kingdom
- Post town: DRONFIELD
- Postcode district: S18
- Police: Derbyshire
- Fire: Derbyshire
- Ambulance: East Midlands

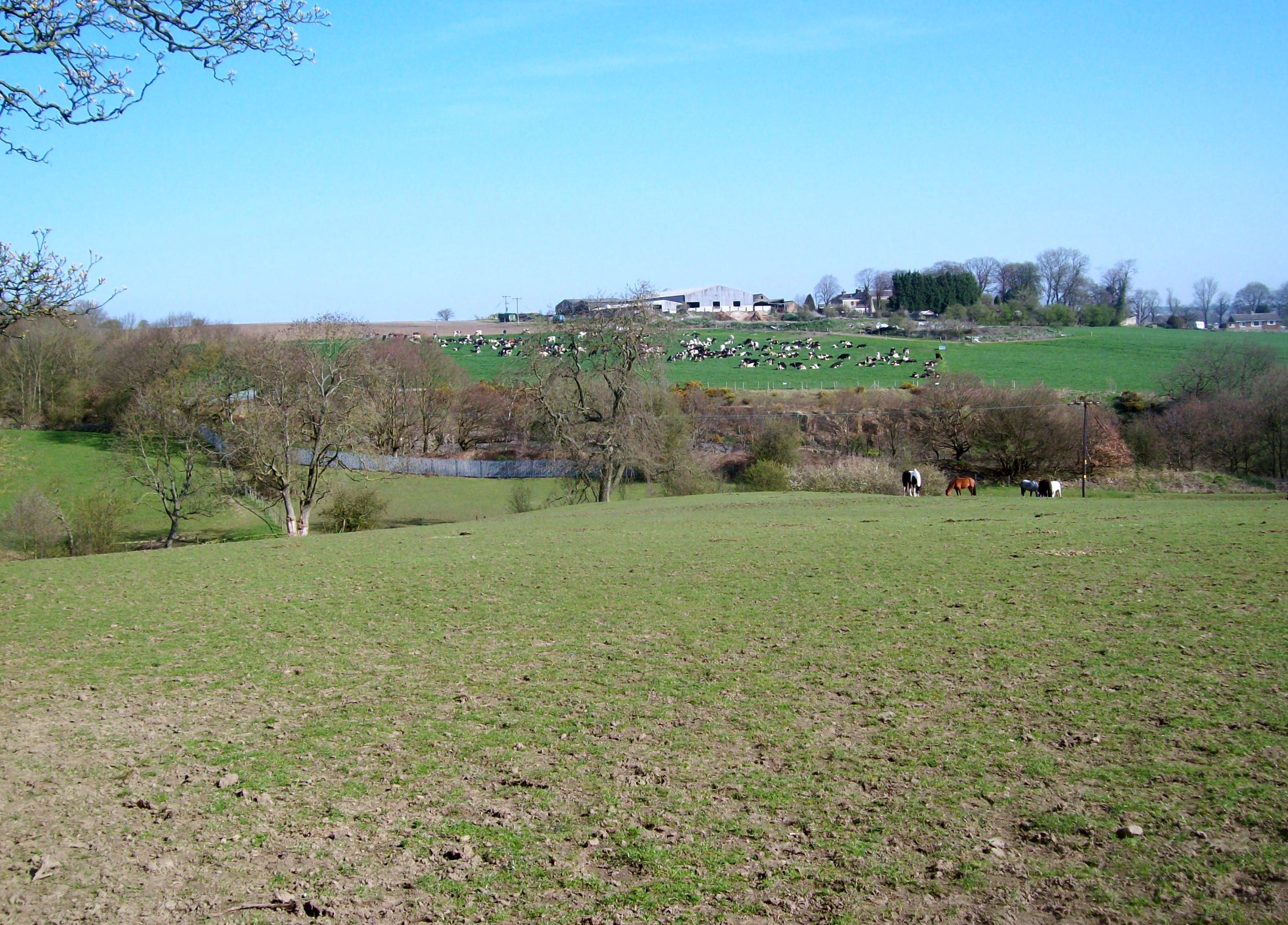
Bowshaw farm

Bowshaw is an area in Derbyshire, England, that now forms part of the town of Dronfield. There is little for the casual visitor to see except a long row of 20th-century houses alongside the road from Dronfield to Sheffield, although some notable buildings include Bowshaw House, built in the 1730s by the Lucas family, Bowshaw Farm (formed by a division of Bowshaw House by the Hatfield family c. 1940) and Bowshaw Inn.
