= Bagshaw =

Hamlet in Derbyshire, England

Coordinates: 53.3272°N 1.8836°W

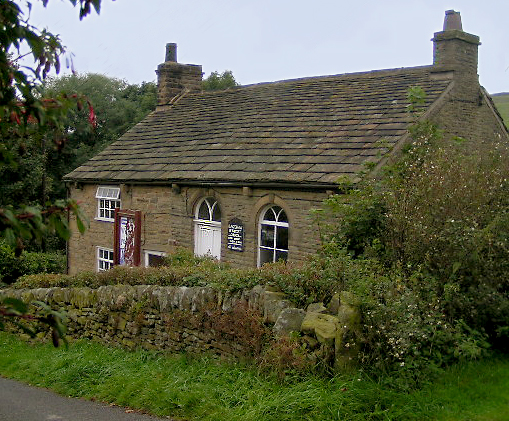
- Bagshaw Methodist Chapel

- Location within Derbyshire
- OS grid reference: SK078811
- Shire county: Derbyshire
- Region: East Midlands
- Country: England
- Sovereign state: United Kingdom
- Post town: High Peak
- Postcode district: SK23
- Police: Derbyshire
- Fire: Derbyshire
- Ambulance: East Midlands

Bagshaw is a hamlet in Derbyshire, England. The hamlet falls within the civil parish of Chapel-en-le-Frith. It is about 1.2 km or 0.75 miles east of Chapel-en-le-Frith, and within the boundaries of the Peak District National Park. It is in the valley of a small stream which flows westward towards the Black Brook. It has a small Methodist chapel.
