= Upper Birchwood =

Coordinates: 53.081°N 1.350°W

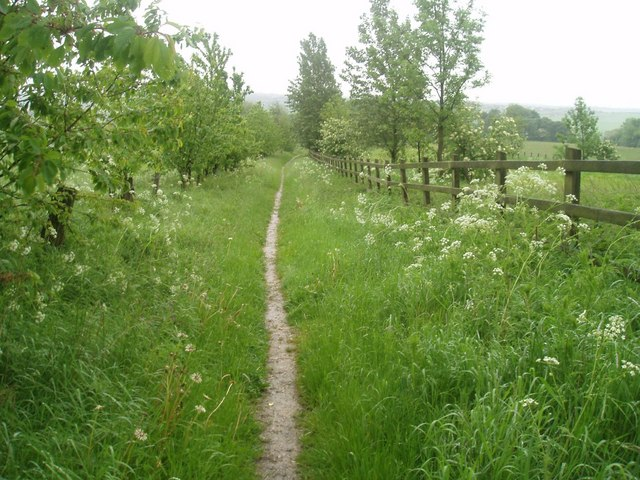
- Bridleway. Upper Birchwood.

- Location within Derbyshire
- OS grid reference: SK437550
- District: Amber Valley
- Shire county: Derbyshire
- Region: East Midlands
- Country: England
- Sovereign state: United Kingdom
- Post town: ALFRETON
- Postcode district: DE55
- Police: Derbyshire
- Fire: Derbyshire
- Ambulance: East Midlands

Upper Birchwood is a village in Derbyshire, England. It is in the civil parish of Pinxton.

Upper Birchwood lies east of the town of Alfreton, and the Erewash Valley line.
