= Godfreyhole =

Coordinates: 53.080°N 1.598°W

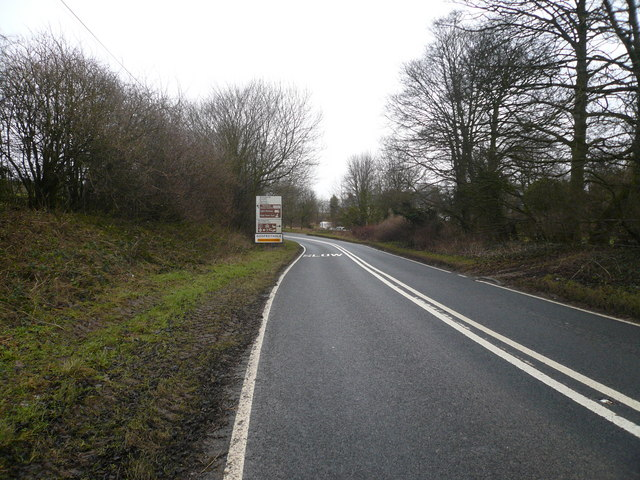
- B5035 at Godfreyhole.

- Location within Derbyshire
- OS grid reference: SK270537
- Civil parish: Wirksworth
- District: Derbyshire Dales
- Shire county: Derbyshire
- Region: East Midlands
- Country: England
- Sovereign state: United Kingdom
- Post town: WIRKSWORTH
- Postcode district: DE4
- Police: Derbyshire
- Fire: Derbyshire
- Ambulance: East Midlands

Godfreyhole is a hamlet in the civil parish of Wirksworth, in the Derbyshire Dales district, in the county of Derbyshire, England. It is located at the junction of the B5035 and West End roads, 2 miles (3.2 km) west of Wirksworth.
