= Mastin Moor =

Village in Derbyshire, England

Coordinates: 53.274°N 1.324°W

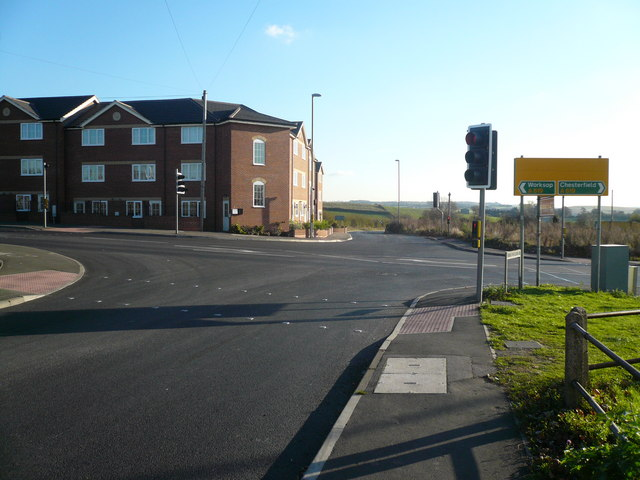
a street photo of a crossroad at Mastin Moor

Mastin Moor is a village east of Staveley in Derbyshire, United Kingdom. The village sits almost entirely on the north side of the A619. As well as houses, the village consists of two local shops, a Chinese takeaway restaurant, and a Miners' Welfare Club.

There were once two pubs in the village, but these were demolished in the mid-2000s, the land reclaimed for building houses and a hospital. The hospital soon closed due to funding issues.
