= Harlesthorpe =

Village in Derbyshire, England

Coordinates: 53.278°N 1.258°W

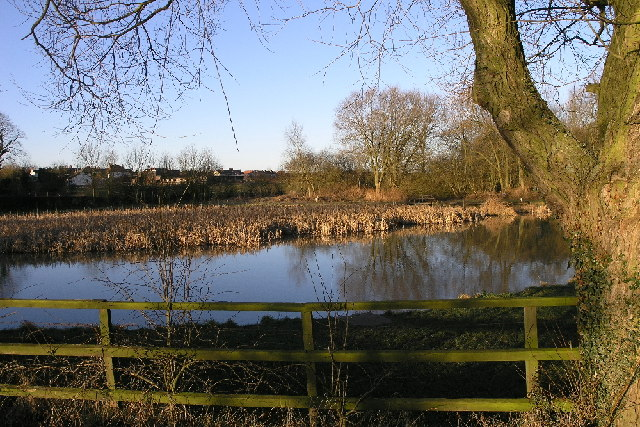
- Harlesthorpe Dam

- Location within Derbyshire
- OS grid reference: SK495759
- District: Bolsover
- Shire county: Derbyshire
- Region: East Midlands
- Country: England
- Sovereign state: United Kingdom
- Post town: CHESTERFIELD
- Postcode district: S43
- Dialling code: 01246
- Police: Derbyshire
- Fire: Derbyshire
- Ambulance: East Midlands
- UK Parliament: Bolsover

Harlesthorpe is a village in Bolsover (district), in the county of Derbyshire. The population of the village is listed under the civil parish of Clowne. It is a peculiar village, located literally just north of Clowne, but almost a part of Clowne. It is separated by the Harlesthorpe Dam, a large Pond, the village is accessible, from the Rotherham Road, A618.

Harlesthorpe Dam was, or so the story used to go, used to supply a head of water to a nearby mill. The mill was said to produce cloth for making sails. This cloth was known as Bump and the name Bump Mill Pond was widely used in the locality.

Harlesthorpe Dam has two bodies of waters to choose from and fishing is available. Both waters offer a variety of species and are well suited to the pleasure, match and specimen angler.

The smaller of the two is a mature, 2-acre (8,100 m^{2}) lake surrounded by trees. In the centre there is a heavily weeded island. Chub to 4 lb (1.8 kg) are the main quarry and there's every chance to crack a chub Mission.

Across the road, the 10-acre (40,000 m^{2}) main lake offers the chance of a large carp to around 24 lb (11 kg). There is a good head of upper doubles. Pellet and paste are amongst the top catching baits and boilies will also catch. Tench are also present and early morning and evening fishing can be very productive times for this species.

Depths vary from four to 12 feet (3.7 m) and there are plenty of features and marginal weed beds to fish to. Other species include, bream, perch, roach and rudd.
