= Breamfield =

Coordinates: 53.076°N 1.559°W

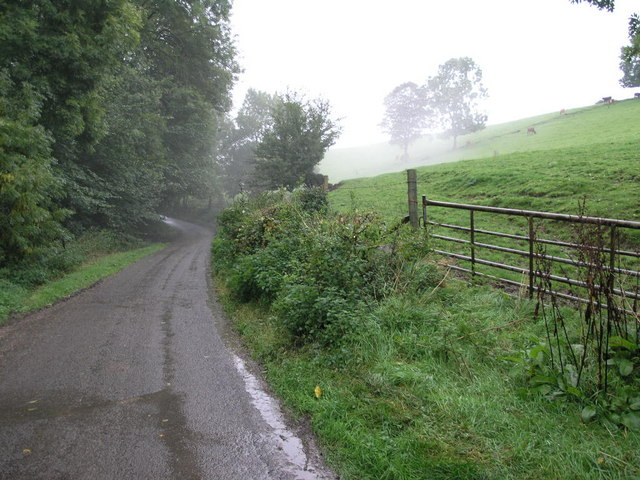
- Breamfield Lane.

- Location within Derbyshire
- OS grid reference: SK296532
- Civil parish: Wirksworth
- District: Derbyshire Dales
- Shire county: Derbyshire
- Region: East Midlands
- Country: England
- Sovereign state: United Kingdom
- Post town: WIRKSWORTH
- Postcode district: DE4
- Police: Derbyshire
- Fire: Derbyshire
- Ambulance: East Midlands

Breamfield is a hamlet in the civil parish of Wirksworth, in the Derbyshire Dales district, in the county of Derbyshire, England. It is located 1 mile southeast of Wirksworth.
