= Stony Houghton =

Hamlet in Derbyshire, England

Coordinates: 53.191°N 1.264°W

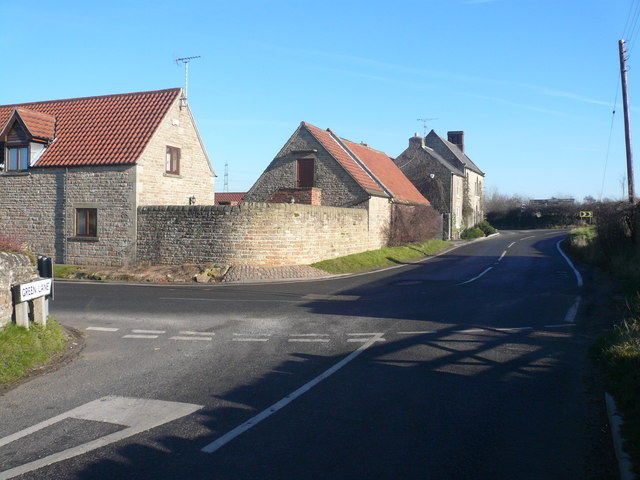
- Stony Houghton.

- Location within Derbyshire
- OS grid reference: SK492662
- District: Bolsover
- Shire county: Derbyshire
- Region: East Midlands
- Country: England
- Sovereign state: United Kingdom
- Post town: PLEASLEY
- Postcode district: NG19
- Police: Derbyshire
- Fire: Derbyshire
- Ambulance: East Midlands

Stony Houghton is a hamlet near Glapwell, part of the parish of Pleasley in Derbyshire, England, close to New Houghton. It is a very quiet area consisting of only a few residential properties amidst farmland and farmsteads, retaining a peaceful environment with attractive scenery and landscape.

Some of the properties around Stoney Houghton are Chatsworth Estate tied cottages, which are rented out to tenants who may be related to previous estate workers who have traditionally rented over the past years.

== History ==
Stony Houghton is a settlement in the Domesday Book and it had a recorded population of 24 households in 1086.

In the 19th century, there were limestone quarries in Stony Houghton.

== Community facilities ==
Scarcliffe Woods are nearby, offering easy access to walking amenities.

== Transport ==
One bus route travels through the village run by Stagecoach in Mansfield.
