= Lower Birchwood =

Village in Derbyshire, England

Coordinates: 53.081°N 1.350°W

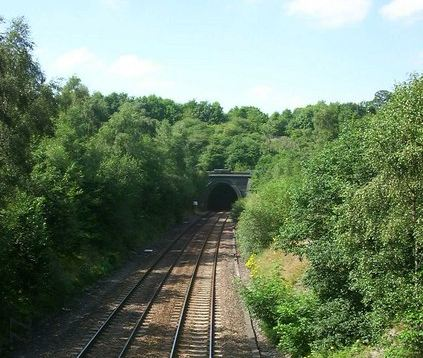
- Tunnel. Lower Birchwood.

- Location within Derbyshire
- OS grid reference: SK436539
- District: Amber Valley
- Shire county: Derbyshire
- Region: East Midlands
- Country: England
- Sovereign state: United Kingdom
- Post town: ALFRETON
- Postcode district: DE55
- Police: Derbyshire
- Fire: Derbyshire
- Ambulance: East Midlands

Lower Birchwood is a village in Derbyshire, England. Lower Birchwood lies east of the town of Alfreton but the population is included in the civil parish of Somercotes.
