= Hackney, Derbyshire =

Suburbs of Darley dale, Derbyshire, England

Coordinates: 53.152°N 1.570°W

Hackney
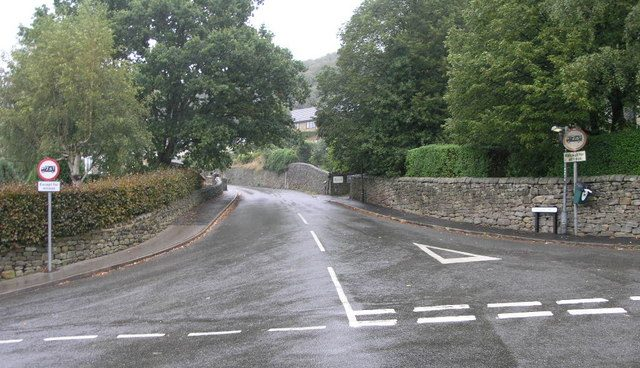
- Farley Hill, Upper Hackney.

- Location within Derbyshire
- OS grid reference: SK288617
- District: Derbyshire Dales
- Shire county: Derbyshire
- Region: East Midlands
- Country: England
- Sovereign state: United Kingdom
- Post town: MATLOCK
- Postcode district: DE4
- Dialling code: 01629
- Police: Derbyshire
- Fire: Derbyshire
- Ambulance: East Midlands

Hackney and Upper Hackney are areas of settlement in Derbyshire, England. The population taken at the 2011 Census is included in the civil parish of Darley Dale.

They are located to the north west of Matlock, and separated from the River Derwent by the A6 road and the Peak Rail railway line. There is a Methodist chapel in the village, whilst the nearest C of E church is St. Helens C of E in Darley Dale. Hackney is home to Darley Dale Primary School on Greenaway Lane. The junior portion of the school is the former annexe of the John Turner secondary modern school from Darley Dale which closed in 1983. After that date the former annexe, which was formerly used as an assembly hall by the primary school, was absorbed into the primary school's infrastructure.

Close to the current Hackney Methodist Church is the former Primitive Methodist Chapel which was replaced by the current Chapel in 1908. Further up the village is the former Mission Church of St Philip and St James which closed around the end of the last century and is now a house.
