= Unthank, Derbyshire =

Hamlet in Derbyshire, England

Coordinates: 53.2808°N 1.5394°W

Unthank
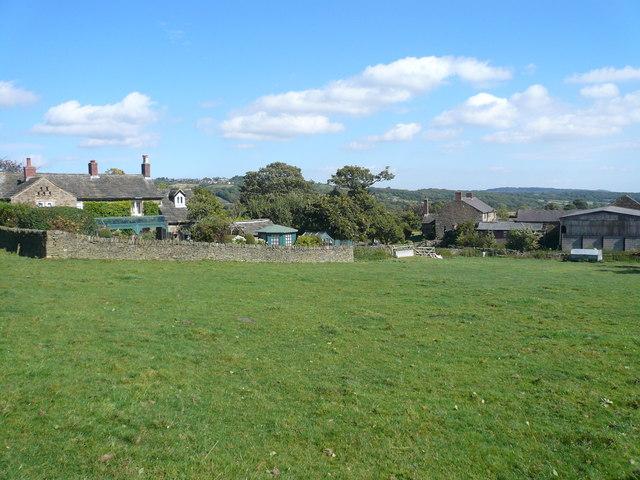
- Farmhouses on Unthank Lane

- Location within Derbyshire
- OS grid reference: SK307760
- District: North East Derbyshire
- Shire county: Derbyshire
- Region: East Midlands
- Country: England
- Sovereign state: United Kingdom
- Post town: DRONFIELD
- Postcode district: S18
- Police: Derbyshire
- Fire: Derbyshire
- Ambulance: East Midlands
- UK Parliament: North East Derbyshire

Unthank is a hamlet in the North East Derbyshire district of Derbyshire, England. It is sited on a narrow lane on the southern slopes of the Cordwell Valley, at an altitude of about 185 metres (610 ft).

On 6 May 1970, a USAF McDonnell-Douglas RF-4C crashed in the nearby Stripes Wood while doing a NATO training exercise. Both crew men ejected and landed at Curbar Edge.
