= Burntheath =

Coordinates: 52.879°N 1.639°W

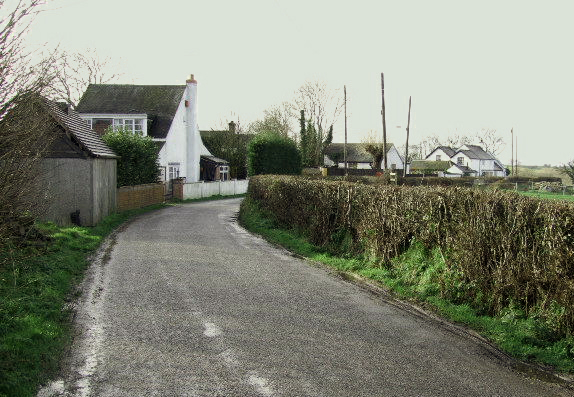
- Top Lane, Burntheath.

- Location within Derbyshire
- Population: 30
- OS grid reference: SK243313
- District: South Derbyshire
- Shire county: Derbyshire
- Region: East Midlands
- Country: England
- Sovereign state: United Kingdom
- Post town: DERBY
- Postcode district: DE65
- Police: Derbyshire
- Fire: Derbyshire
- Ambulance: East Midlands

Burntheath is a hamlet in Derbyshire, England. It is located 1 mile north of Hilton, and adjacent to the A50 road.
