= Tunstead Milton =

Village in Derbyshire, England

Coordinates: 53.315°N 1.954°W

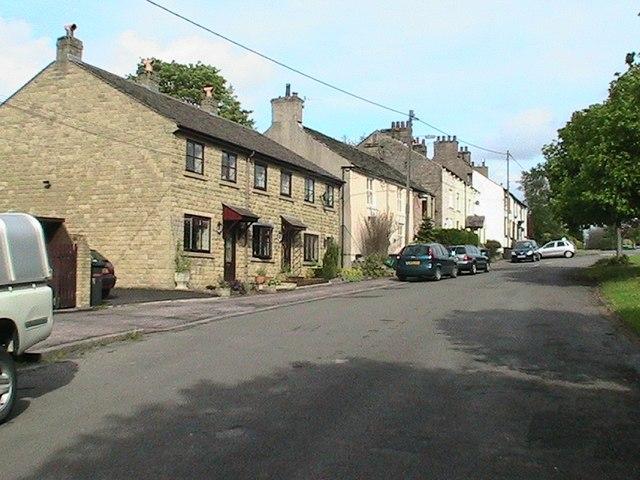
- Tunstead Milton.

- Location within Derbyshire
- OS grid reference: SK031797
- Civil parish: Chapel-en-le-Frith
- District: High Peak
- Shire county: Derbyshire
- Region: East Midlands
- Country: England
- Sovereign state: United Kingdom
- Post town: HIGH PEAK
- Postcode district: SK23
- Police: Derbyshire
- Fire: Derbyshire
- Ambulance: East Midlands

Tunstead Milton is a village in the High Peak district, in Derbyshire, England.

It is situated on the B5470 road west of, and in the parish of Chapel-en-le-Frith, near the northern edge of the Combs Reservoir.

It is the location of Tunstead Dickey, a "Screaming Skull", and is mentioned in Highways and Byways in Derbyshire by J B Frith, a guide published in 1905, and in Black's Guide published throughout the 19th century.

The name Tunstead is likely derived from hundred homestead and Milton from mill town.

The hamlet had in the past a post office, a garage and two public houses, all of which have now closed.

It should not be confused with Tunstead, which is roughly five miles to the southeast, near Wormhill.
