= New Houghton =

Village in Derbyshire, England

Coordinates: 53.182°N 1.253°W

- Village
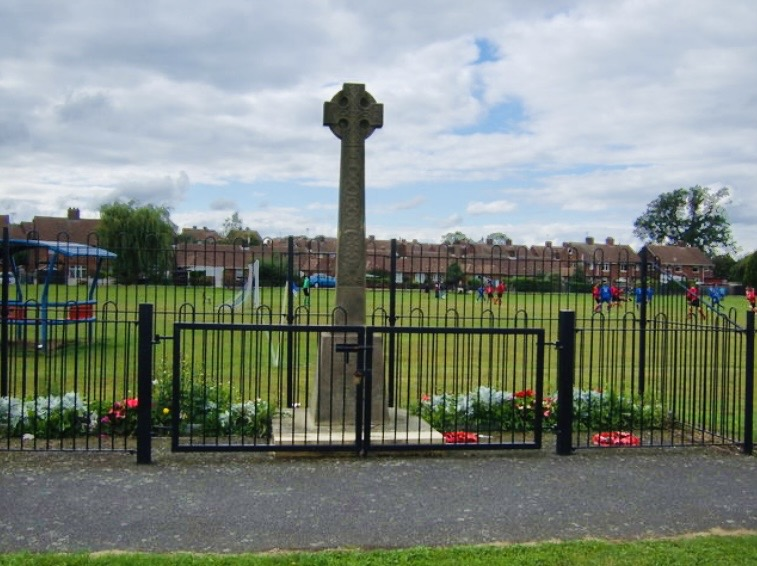
- War Memorial

- Location within Derbyshire
- Population: 1,453 (2020 estimate)
- OS grid reference: SK4965
- Civil parish: Pleasley
- District: Bolsover
- Shire county: Derbyshire
- Region: East Midlands
- Country: England
- Sovereign state: United Kingdom
- Post town: MANSFIELD
- Postcode district: NG19
- Dialling code: 01623
- Police: Derbyshire
- Fire: Derbyshire
- Ambulance: East Midlands
- UK Parliament: Bolsover
- Website: http://pleasleyparishcouncil.org.uk

New Houghton is a village in the Bolsover District of Derbyshire, England, 3 miles (4.8 km) from both Bolsover and Mansfield.

== Governance ==
It lies within the civil parish of Pleasley. It is administered as part of the District of Bolsover. The area of Pleasley Parish Council includes Pleasley, New Houghton, Pleasley Vale and Stony Houghton.

== History ==
New Houghton was originally built in the 1890s to house workers from Pleasley Pit which was worked from 1874 until its closure in 1983, when the remaining workable coal reserves were linked with and extracted via nearby Shirebrook Colliery.

== Education ==
The Pleasley and New Houghton school was erected in 1884 in Pleasley next to the border with New Houghton, designed to accommodate 100 children. It is named Anthony Bek School, after a Lord of the Manor of Pleasley from 1293. Anthony Bek was also Bishop of Durham from 1283. It is now a primary school, with secondary education available at Shirebrook Academy.

== Places of Worship ==
The village had a small church called Christ Church (now closed) on the Rotherham Road, next to the New Houghton Community Centre. The church was demolished to make way for housing on the 17th of April 2019.

== Village Amenities ==
- There is a combined village store and post office.
- The village had a public house called The Stanton (now closed and for sale during 2014).

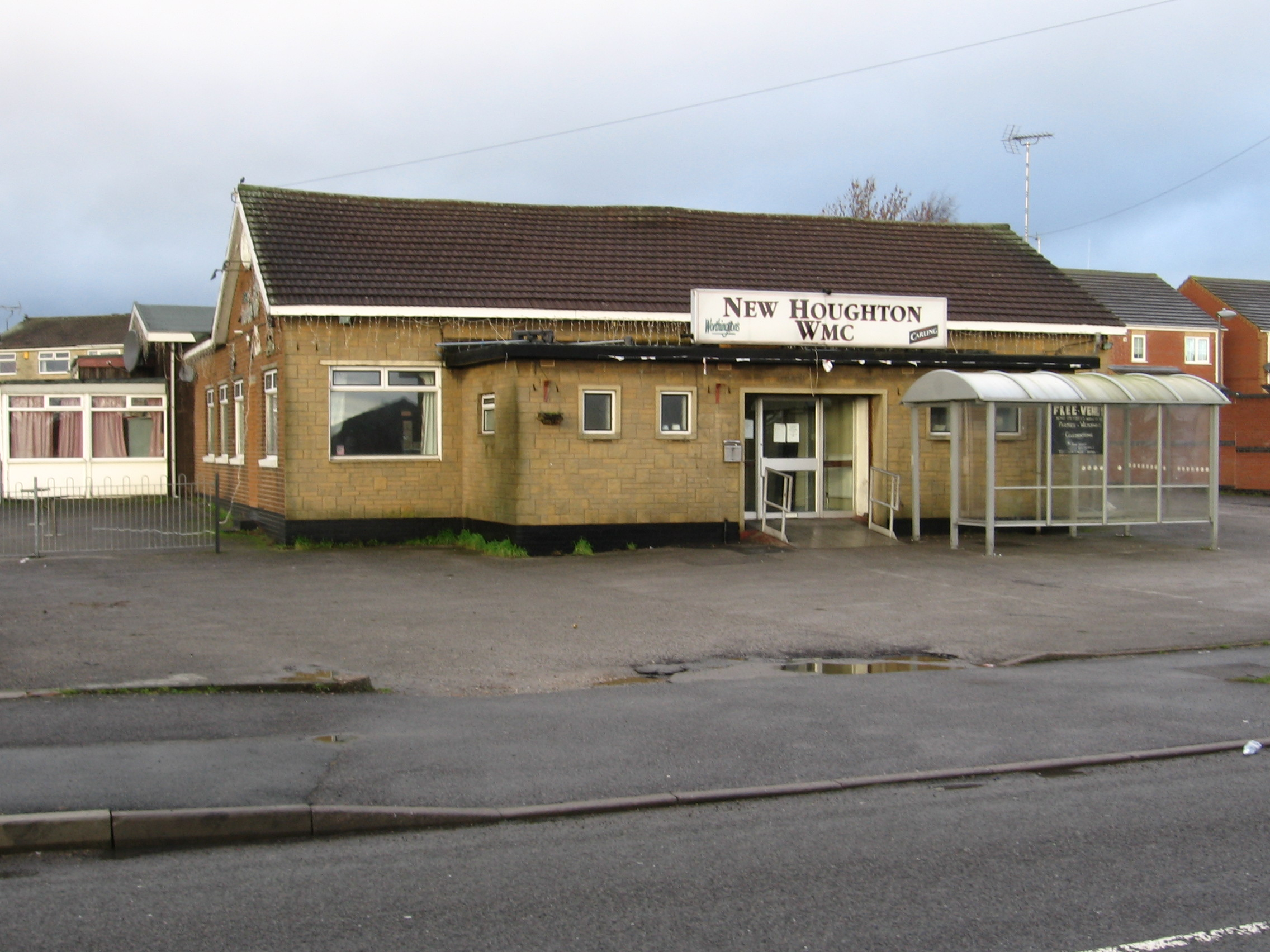
Working Men's Club

- The New Houghton Working Men's Club has occupied its present site in the centre of the village since 1957. The establishment did close for a duration from 2013 to 2015 where it reopened and was renamed to New Houghton SC 15.
- The football team plays in a local Sunday league. Its home ground is the full-size football pitch adjacent to the Working Mans Club.[Now Disbanded]
- Community Centre, next to the church, run by Pleasley Parish Council.
- Community House, near the village store.

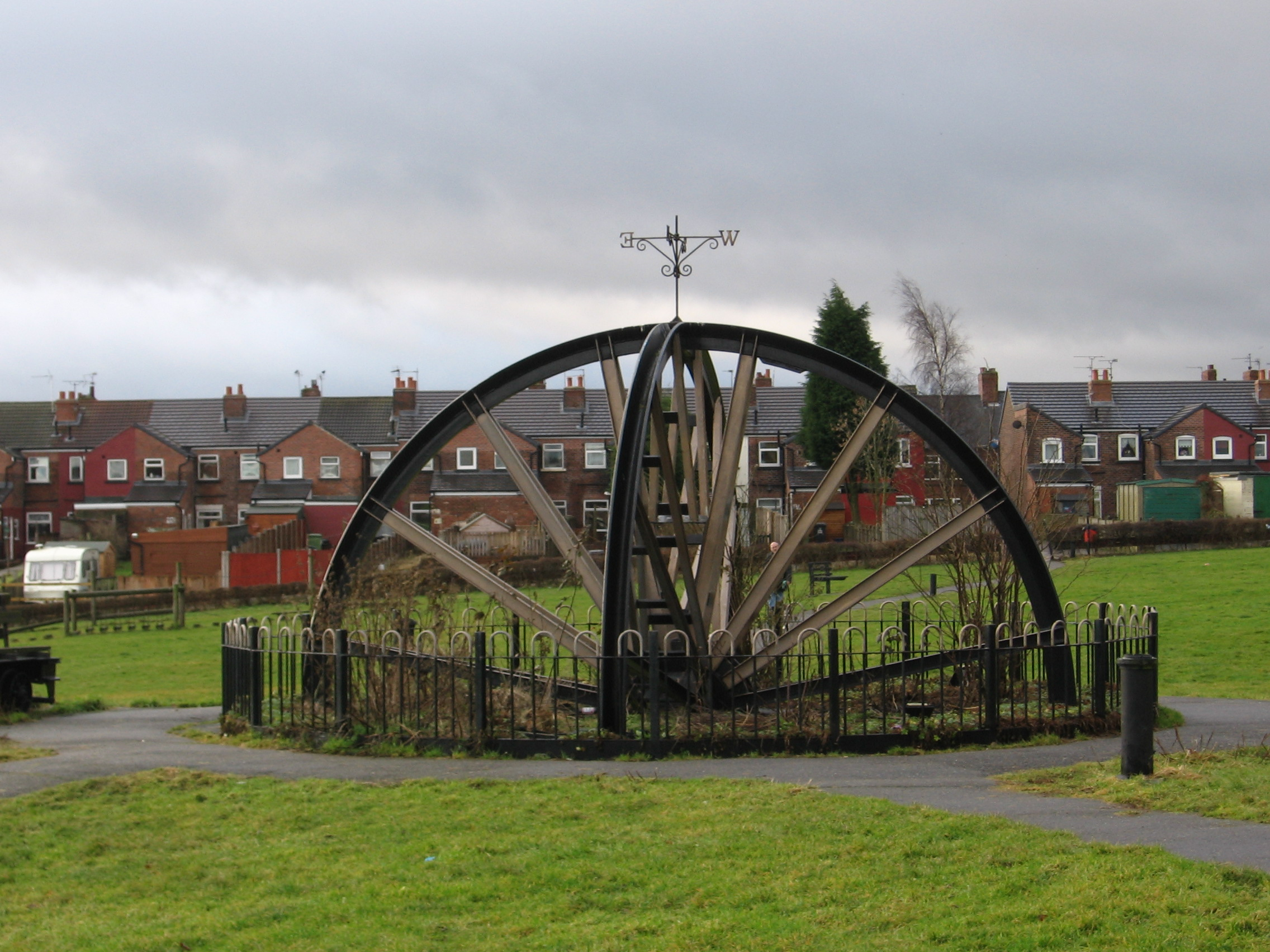
Millennium Green

- New Houghton has a public open space – a Millennium Green, created to celebrate the new millennium of 2000 on a what used to be a rather overgrown, ugly site. This contains a pithead wheel, as a reminder of New Houghton's mining past, when most of the men worked at the nearby Pleasley Pit. The Millennium Green has reverted to a rather overgrown site. A charitable trust was set up for the upkeep and maintenance of this green – New Houghton Millennium Green Trust, Charity Number 1072409, Date Registered 1998-11-12, Date Removed 2010-05-09.

== Transport ==
Roads

New Houghton is on the B6417 Pleasley to Clowne road. The village is separated from Pleasley (and bounded on its south-west side) by the A617 Chesterfield to Mansfield road.

Bus Services

As at January 2011, there are hourly commercial bus services during the daytime on weekdays from the village centre on the Rotherham Road (B6417) to Mansfield, Bolsover and Sheffield. There also half-hourly services to Mansfield and Chesterfield from bus stops on the A617 to the south-west of the village. Evening and Sunday services run less frequently and are subsidised by Derbyshire County Council.

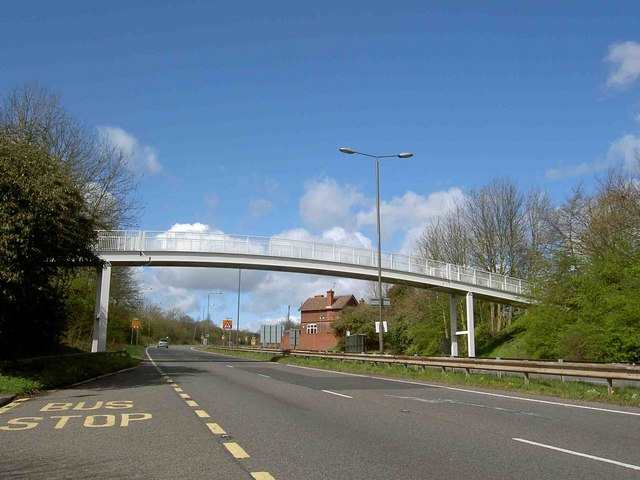
Footbridge over A617 leading towards Glapwell, showing New Houghton side to right and Pleasley area to left of road

Train Services

The local stations for Pleasley were closed in 1930 (Midland Railway) and in 1931 (Great Northern Railway). The nearest stations are now Mansfield, and Chesterfield.

Footpaths and Trails New Houghton is linked to Pleasley via the border which is at the end of the Anthony Bek school playing field, a footbridge over the A617 connects to the rest of Pleasley.Trails.
