= Tibshelf Community School =

Community school in Derbyshire, England

Location
- Doe Hill Lane; Tibshelf, Derbyshire, DE55 5LZ; England; 53.1398°N 1.3532°W

Information
- Type: Community school
- Local authority: Derbyshire
- Department for Education URN: 112949 Tables
- Ofsted: Reports
- Headteacher: Lucie Wainwright
- Gender: Mixed
- Age: 11 to 16
- Enrolment: 861 as of May 2022
- Website: http://www.tibshelf.derbyshire.sch.uk/

Tibshelf Community School is a mixed secondary school located in Tibshelf in the English county of Derbyshire.

It is a community school administered by Derbyshire County Council, and serves a catchment area of nine villages located across the districts of Bolsover and North East Derbyshire. They include Blackwell, Newton, Heath, Hilcote, Holmewood, Morton, Pilsley, Tibshelf and Westhouses.

Tibshelf Community School offers GCSEs and BTECs as programmes of study for pupils. The school relocated to new buildings during 2014.

== Notable alumni ==
- Sophie Baggaley - Association football goalkeeper who plays for Birmingham City L.F.C. and has represented England at under 23 level, attended Tibshelf Community School from 2008 to 2013.
