= Blackwell Rural District =

Former local government area in the UK

Coordinates: 53.17°N 1.34°W

Blackwell
- Blackwell Rural District shown within Derbyshire in 1970.
- History
  - Created: 1894
  - Abolished: 1974
  - Succeeded by: Bolsover
- Status: Rural district
- Government: Blackwell Rural District Council

Blackwell was a rural district in Derbyshire, England from 1894 to 1974. It was created under the Local Government Act 1894 based on that part of the Mansfield rural sanitary district which was in Derbyshire (the Nottinghamshire part forming Skegby Rural District).

It was abolished under the Local Government Act 1972, becoming part of the new district of Bolsover.

The parishes within the district included:

- Ault Hucknall
- Blackwell
- Glapwell
- Pinxton
- Pleasley
- Scarcliffe
- Shirebrook
- South Normanton
- Tibshelf
