= Newton, Derbyshire =

Village in Derbyshire, England

Coordinates: 53.130°N 1.341°W

Newton
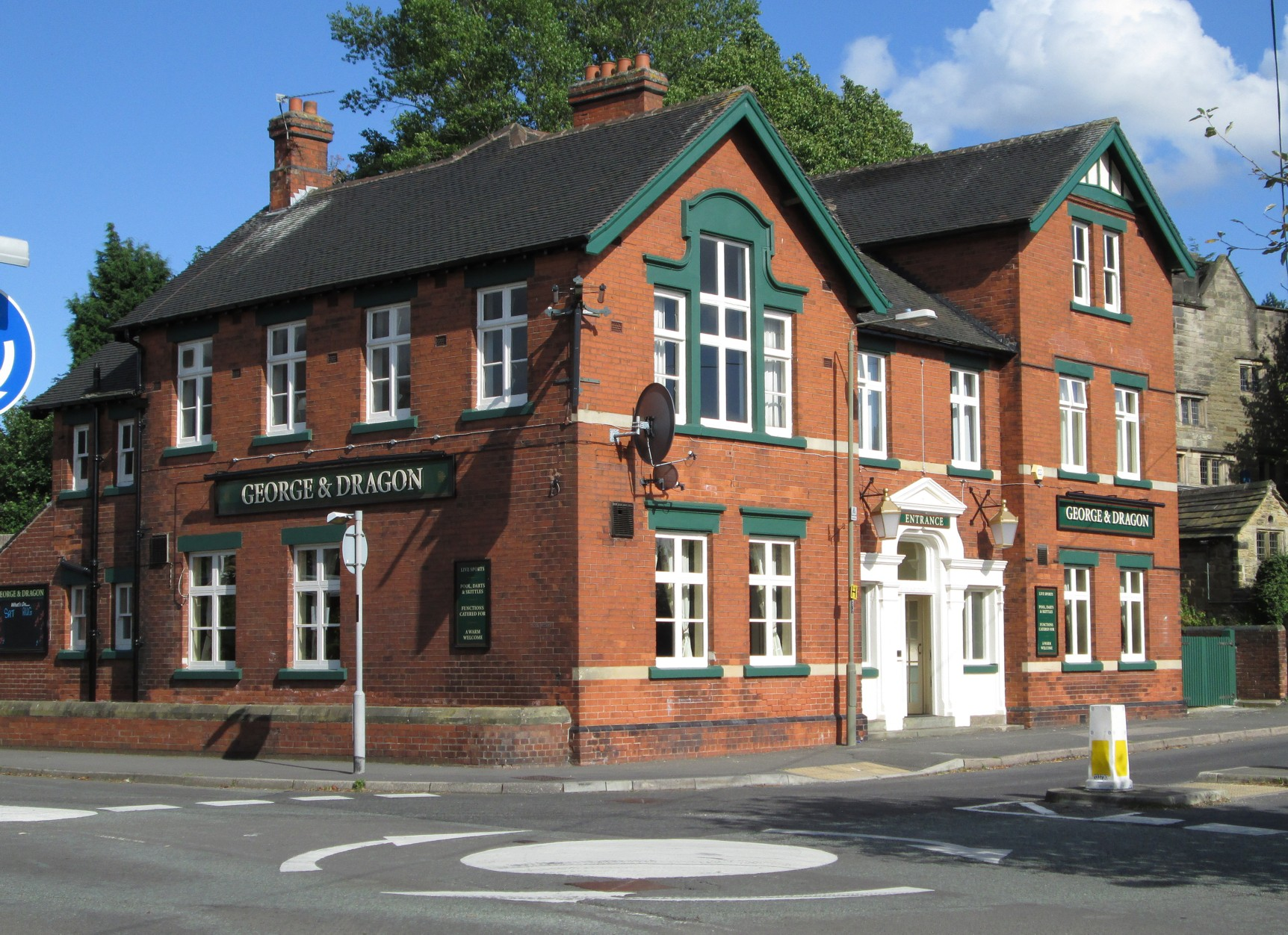
- George & Dragon

- Location within Derbyshire
- Population: 4,163 for Blackwell Parish (Census 2001)
- OS grid reference: SK4459
  - London: 123 mi (198 km)
- Civil parish: Blackwell
- District: Bolsover
- Shire county: Derbyshire
- Region: East Midlands
- Country: England
- Sovereign state: United Kingdom
- Post town: ALFRETON
- Postcode district: DE55
- Dialling code: 01773
- Police: Derbyshire
- Fire: Derbyshire
- Ambulance: East Midlands
- UK Parliament: Bolsover
- Website: http://www.blackwellpc.org.uk/

Newton is a village in the civil parish of Blackwell, in the Bolsover district of Derbyshire, England, about a mile south of Tibshelf.

== Other Newtons ==
Newton is the commonest placename in England, there being 87 in total.

In the same region are:

- Newton Solney, near Burton-on-Trent
- Newtown, Derbyshire, near New Mills
- Newton Grange, near Alsop en le Dale
- Newton, Greater Manchester, near Hyde
- Newton, Nottinghamshire, near East Bridgford
- Newton, Doncaster, in South Yorkshire.

== Governance ==
Newton is one of the four villages (wards) that make up the civil parish of Blackwell – the other villages being Blackwell, Hilcote, and Westhouses. The Parish Council has twelve members across the four wards and meets monthly.

The civil parish of Blackwell is part of the shire district of Bolsover. The parish is represented by two councillors on Bolsover District Council.

The shire district of Bolsover is part of the shire county of Derbyshire. The parish is represented by one councillor on Derbyshire County Council, although the electoral division covers South Normanton East and Tibshelf as well as Blackwell.

Blackwell civil parish forms part of the Bolsover parliamentary constituency. The MP currently (2010) is Dennis Skinner, who was elected MP in the 1970 general election. He has held the seat ever since.

== History ==
=== Historical Timeline ===
Some of the main events in Newton's history are listed in the table below, in date order. The final column provides the source of the information about each event.

Newton – Historical Timeline
Year	Event	Source
1085	Domesday Book records "Blackwelle and Neutone Leuric with Levenot".	
1554	Newton (Old) Hall in 2003.jpg First record of Newton (Old) Hall. This is a small manor house, constructed of locally-quarried sandstone, with a stone slate roof. It is a listed building and is now a private residence. The other manor house in Newton was an older and larger building, but was demolished in 1793.	and
1577	First record of George & Dragon ale house.	
1600	Red Barn Bell Pits in 2009.jpg Coal-mining in bell-pit style. The "bell pits" were where holes were dug and coal taken out so far as it was safe, then another hole was dug alongside and the earth used to fill in the previous hole. This was apparently a common method of mining in the 16th century and possibly earlier.	
1754	Jedediah Strutt invented "Derby Rib" process for cloth manufacture.	See Notable People section.
1839	Tithe map shows that Newton was an agricultural settlement based around the junction of Cragg Lane, Hall Lane and Alfreton Road, with the Old Hall as the central focus with farmsteads located around it.	
1851	Census shows that 48 framework knitters are employed in Newton. Before the coming of the deep mines in 1868, coal-mining was done on a relatively small scale and the Blackwell area was better known as a centre for domestic framework knitting of hosiery.	
1868	The Babbington Colliery Company opened the first deep mine at Tibshelf "Bottom Pit". This gave rise to new housing at Sherwood Street, Bamford Street, Main Street and New Street.	and
1872	Blackwell Colliery Company opened A Winning Colliery (off Fordbridge Lane). In 1875, it opened another colliery at B Winning (at Hilcote). By 1933, A Winning had 1340 employees and B Winning 727 employees. The Colliery Company also had pits at Shirland, Alfreton and Sutton.	
1886	Opening of Tibshelf & Newton railway station.	
1893	Opening of Great Central Railway line.	
1894	Blackwell Parish Council first meeting.	
1898	Newton old school in 2010. School opened in former Newton Chapel. Prior to its use as a school between 1898 and 1908, this was a Primitive Methodist Chapel that was built in 1880 and enlarged in 1889. It appears to have been superseded by the larger chapel across the road in 1904. The 1938 OS map shows it in use as a hall.	and
1902	Post office opens.	
1904	Methodist Chapel in 2010 Primitive Methodist Chapel opens. This superseded the chapel on the opposite side of Main Street – see entry for 1898 above.	
1908	Newton Primary School in 2010 Current Newton School opens. The school was designed by George H. Widdows, Derbyshire Chief Architect. Widdows was nationally acknowledged as a leading and influential designer of schools in the early twentieth century. By the time Widdows retired in 1936, he had designed some sixty elementary and seventeen secondary schools in Derbyshire. Much of the original Newton School building remains but there have been multiple alterations over the years, especially at the south end following fire damage.	and
1908	First police officer stationed in Newton on Wire Lane.	
1908	Former Co-op Store in 2015. Co-operative Store built on Newton Green. This was a branch of the Tibshelf Equitable Co-operative Society Limited. This building has a date-stone showing "1908". A former resident of Newton recalls that, in 1936, there were 3 departments of the Co-op within this building at the corner of Littlemoor Lane and Hall Lane – these were (left to right) a drapery, a grocery and a butcher.	
1911	Gas main laid to Newton.	
1911	The "Coronation Palace" picture house opened.	
1919	Church hall (now Community Centre) opened.	
1920	First bus services.	
1926	Coronation Palace closes.	
1930	Tibshelf & Newton Station in 2007 Closure of Tibshelf & Newton railway station.	
1930	Work began on constructing Whiteborough Reservoirs. Built on part of an Iron Age fort, the waterworks at the top of Newtonwood Lane (to the east of Newton village) is the water supply point for the parish of Blackwell (includes Newton). Known as Whiteborough Reservoirs, they were constructed by Eastwoods of Warsop. In October 1930, the Ministry of Health sanctioned a loan of £160,000 for a joint scheme for the benefit of Ault Hucknall, Blackwell, Glapwell, Pinxton, Pleasley, Scarcliffe, Shirebrook, South Normanton, Tibshelf and Upper Langwith. Work began in December 1930 and, on completion, each reservoir held 525,000 gallons of water. The water is pumped from Budby in Nottinghamshire to Stoney Houghton, then on to the reservoirs. To increase the supply, further reservoirs were added later.	
1933	Tibshelf Bottom Pit closed.	
1937	Picture House re-opens as "The Metro".	
1950	Building of "Charnwood Crescent" housing estate.	
1963	Closure of Tibshelf Town railway station.	
1966	Closure of Great Central Railway line.	
1967	Opening of M1 motorway.	
1969	Building of "Hallfield Road" housing estate (170 dwellings).	
1984–1985	Miners Strike.	
1986	Pavilion opened on sports field.	
1989	Opening of Five Pits Trail.	Five Pits Trail
1992	Closure of Silverhill Colliery and associated rail link to Westhouses.	
1994	Newton – War Memorial and Community Centre in 2010 Community Centre opened (following purchase and renovation of former Church Hall by Parish Council). The centenary of the formation of the Parish Council in 1894 is celebrated by means of a tapestry which is on display inside the Centre.	
1998	Opening of Tibshelf motorway services.	
2002	Designation of Newton Conservation Area. A conservation area is defined as "an area of special architectural or historic interest the character or appearance of which it is desirable to preserve or enhance". In Newton, the historic core of the village is considered to be a good local example of a turn-of-the twentieth-century agricultural settlement and has been largely unaltered in spite of post-war expansion. The area designated as a conservation area in 2002 is centred around the Hall Lane and Cragg Lane area.	
2007	Newtonwood Lane Viaduct on Silverhill Trail in 2010 Opening of Silverhill Trail.	
2013	Publication of proposed route of HS2 (high speed railway from London to Leeds). The route passes through the parish of Blackwell, just to the east of Newton and the M1 motorway.	
2013	Planning permission granted for 49 dwellings at "Newton Fields" (off of Thurgaton Way). Planning permission was granted for a further 40 dwellings at "Newton Fields" in 2015.	and
2015	Post Office and general store on Main Street prior to closure in 2015. Post Office relocated from Main Street to Littlemoor Lane. Post Office and general store on Littlemoor Lane in 2015.	

=== Shops and Services over the years ===
The table below shows how the number of shops and services in Newton has varied over the years. In the early 1900s, Newton was almost self-sufficient. The number of shops in each category is shown in brackets.

Newton – Shops & Services over the Years
1900	1912	1938	1980	2017
General store & beer-off	General store (9)	General store (3)	General store (3)	
Post office & general store	Post office & general store	Post office & general store	Post office & general store	Post office & general store
Greengrocer	Greengrocer	Greengrocer		
Draper	Draper (2)	Draper		
General Dealer	General Dealer			
Herbalist				
Carter (2)	Fly proprietor			
Hardware	Hardware			
Blacksmith	Blacksmith			
	Boot maker			
Shoe repairer	Boot repairer		Shoe repairer	
Hosiery manufacture				
	Co-op (butchers, grocery, drapery)	Co-op (butchers, grocery, drapery)		
	Butcher (2)	Butcher (2)	Butcher	
	Hairdresser (4)	Hairdresser (3)	Hairdresser (2)	
	Public house (2)	Public house (2)	Public house (3)	Public house (2)
	Institute & club	Billiard hall		
	Cinema	Cinema		
	Glass & china dealer			
	Confectioner		Baker	
	Cycle dealer			
	Pawnbrokers			
		Newsagent (2)	Newsagent	Newsagent
		Chip shop (2)	Chip shop	Chip shop
		Chemist		
		Bookmaker		
		Coal merchant		
			Garage (repairs & petrol)	Garage (repairs)
			Craft shop	
				Carpet shop

== Geography ==
=== Lie of the Land ===
Newton village centre (war memorial) is 160 metres above mean sea level, rising north-eastwards to 204 metres at the top of Newtonwood Lane (Whiteborough Hill) and dropping south-westwards to 144 metres at South Street. Newton is drained by small watercourses on both the east and west sides. Both watercourses eventually reach the River Amber at Oakerthorpe.

=== Geology ===
Most of Newton lies on the Pennine Middle Coal Measures Formation bedrock. This is a mix of mudstone, siltstone, sandstone and coal seams. The sandstone was used as a building material, especially during the pre-industrial era. The presence of coal accounts for the growth of the population in Newton during the industrial era. The mudstone enabled many of the local collieries (including Blackwell) to manufacture their own bricks. To the east, Newton is overlooked by two Nottinghamshire hills, Whiteborough Hill and Strawberry Bank, that are capped by dolomitic limestone of the Cadeby Formation.

== Education ==
- Newton has a primary school on Hall Lane, providing education for children in the age range 4 to 11.
- As regards secondary education, Newton is in the catchment area of Tibshelf Community School, which caters for the 11 to 16 age range.

== Places of Worship ==
The only church actually in Newton is the Methodist Church on Main Street. The nearest Anglican church is St Werburgh's at Old Blackwell. Of the original late 12th-century church, there remains but one pillar, in Transitional style, preserved on the inner face of the north wall. The tower dates from an 1828 rebuild, while the rest of the church is of 1878. In the porch is the stump of a Saxon cross.

== Leisure facilities ==
For a village of its size, Newton is fairly well-served by leisure facilities. These include:

- Children's playgrounds at Bamford Street, South Street and Town Lane.
- Sports field off Charnwood Crescent, including a multi-use games area.
- Allotments off Littlemoor Lane and South Street.
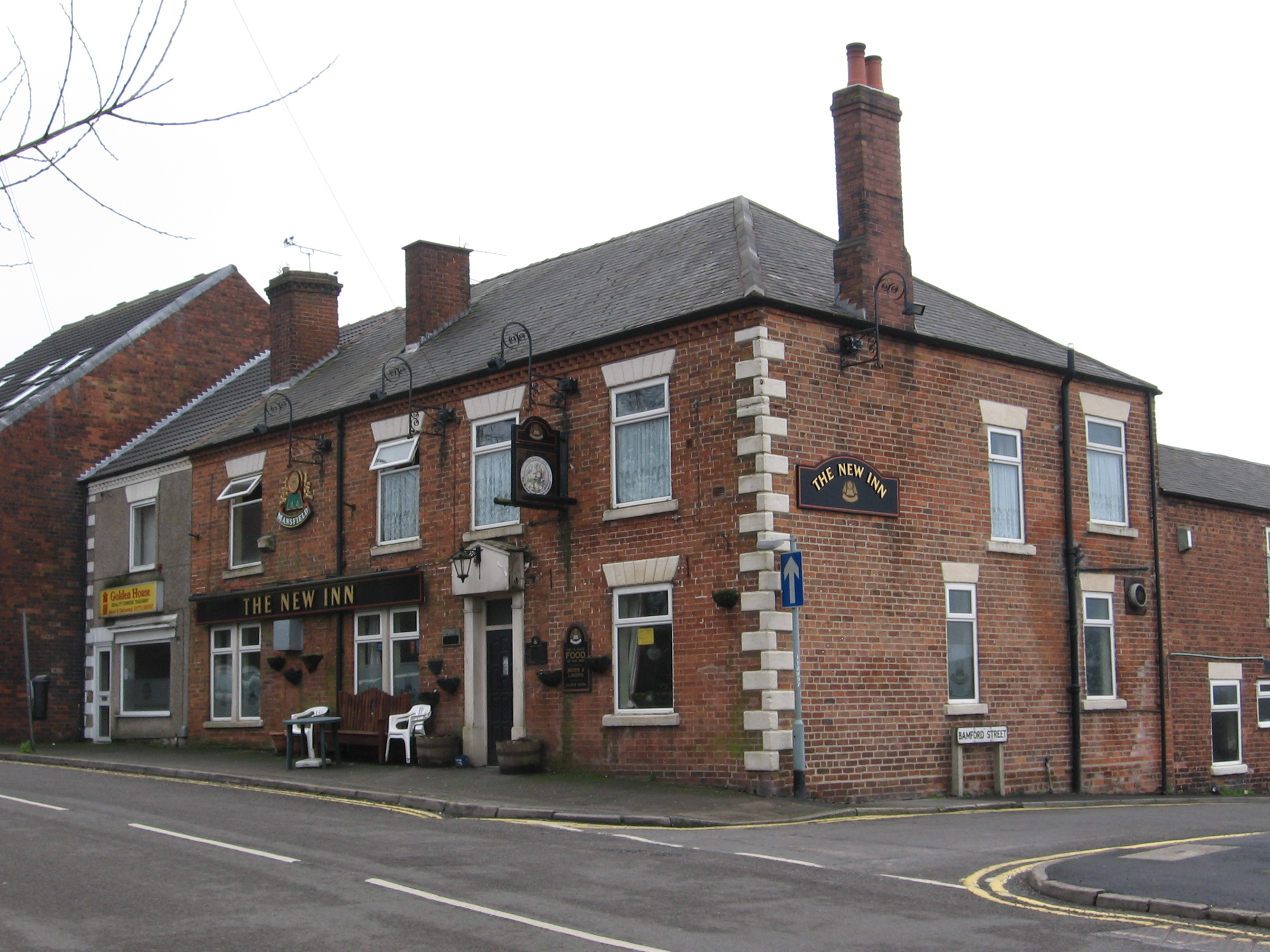
- Newton – New Inn
  Public houses: George & Dragon and New Inn offering weekend entertainment on a regular basis.
- Group meetings at Community Centre, including Old Peoples Club and Women's Institute.
- Carnival events several times a year.
- Film showings at the Community Centre ("Cinema Newton") during the winter months.

== Transport ==
Roads

Newton is on the B6026 road, which effectively provides a link between the villages south-east of Chesterfield and junction 28 of the M1. The M1 passes immediately to the east of Newton, although there is no direct access to the motorway. The Tibshelf motorway service area has two service entries (northbound and southbound) onto Newtonwood Lane.

Bus Services

As at February 2015, there are commercial bus services during the daytime on weekdays to Alfreton (2-per-hour), Chesterfield (hourly) and Mansfield (hourly). There are evening and Sunday services to Alfreton and Mansfield but these run less frequently and are subsidised by Derbyshire County Council.

Train Services

The local stations for Newton were closed in 1930 (Tibshelf & Newton) and in 1963 (Tibshelf Town). The nearest stations are now Alfreton, Chesterfield and Sutton Parkway.

Footpaths and Trails

Newton is linked to neighbouring villages by road-side pavements and public footpaths. Newton is close to the junction of the Five Pits Trail with the Silverhill Trail, which provide longer-distance recreational routes.

== People ==
Jedediah Strutt- one of the key people in the Industrial Revolution, has links with Newton. He was particularly involved in the development of mechanised clothing production, setting up mills in Belper and Milford that became the prototype for mills all over the world. Although it is certain that he was born, lived and worked in the Newton area, there is some confusion over exact locations:

- Jedediah was born into a farming family in 1726 either in South Normanton or Newton.
- In 1754 Jedediah Strutt inherited his uncle's farm stock in Blackwell.
- Strutt's father (William) was a tenant of Newton Old Hall (on Cragg Lane). Jedediah is said to have worked on his revolutionary stocking frame at the hall.
- In 1754, Jedediah is said to have lived "where the old folk's bungalows are now in Main Street".
- Jedediah Strutt married Elizabeth Woollat 25 September 1755 at Blackwell.
- Jedediah died in 1797 and was buried in Belper.

Sophie Baggaley- Association football goalkeeper who plays for Birmingham City L.F.C. and has represented England up to under 20 level.
