= Pilsley =

Pilsley may refer to two places in England:

- Pilsley, Derbyshire Dales
- Pilsley, North East Derbyshire
  - Pilsley railway station, in use 1893–1959
