= Listed buildings in Blackwell, Bolsover =

Blackwell is a civil parish in the Bolsover District of Derbyshire, England. The parish contains eight listed buildings that are recorded in the National Heritage List for England. Of these, one is listed at Grade II*, the middle of the three grades, and the others are at Grade II, the lowest grade. The parish contains the villages of Blackwell and Newton, and the surrounding area. The listed buildings consist of houses cottages and associated structures, farmhouses, a church, and a tombstone in the churchyard.

== Key ==
Grade	Criteria
II*	Particularly important buildings of more than special interest
II	Buildings of national importance and special interest

== Buildings ==
Name and location	Photograph	Date	Notes	Grade
Hilcote Hall; 53.11776°N 1.33678°W	—	17th century	A house that was later altered and extended, it is in sandstone, with quoins, and slate roofs with moulded gable copings and finials. There are two storeys and attics, and roughly an L-shaped plan. The main front is on a plinth, and has a projecting bay containing a round-headed staircase window with a fluted keystone and a Venetian-style window above. To its right are two canted bay windows, the other windows are sashes, and at the top is a coped parapet and a gabled dormer. The doorway in the left return has a chamfered surround.	II
Old Farm Cottage; 53.12312°N 1.33501°W	—	Mid 17th century	The house is in rendered stone with a tile roof. There are two storeys, three bays, and a single-storey extension on the left. In the centre is a doorway with a chamfered quoined surround, and the windows are mullioned with three lights.	II
Newton Old Hall; 53.12831°N 1.33822°W		1690	The house is in sandstone on a deep plinth, with quoins, coped parapets and ball finials, and a stone slate roof, hipped on the right, and with a coped gable on the left. There are two storeys and attics, and three bays. In the south front is a doorway with a chamfered quoined surround, and in the front facing the street, which was two gables, is a similar doorway. Most of the windows are mullioned with hood moulds, and some of the mullions have been replaced.	II*
Gate piers and wall, Newton Old Hall; 53.12823°N 1.33827°W	—	1690	The gate piers and wall are in stone. There are two pairs of gate piers, each is square and plain, and has a moulded cornice and a large ball finial. The piers are connected by a high wall with rounded copings.	II
Three Lane End Farmhouse; 53.12260°N 1.33615°W		Early 18th century	The farmhouse is in stone, partly rendered, with painted stone dressings, and a slate roof with coped gables on moulded kneelers. There are two storeys and two bays. The doorway on the left has a plain surround, and the windows are sashes.	II
Tombstone; 53.12095°N 1.33831°W	—	c. 1734	The tombstone in the churchyard of St Werburgh's Church is to the memory of Richard and Hannah Brown. It consists of two stones in gritstone about 2 feet (0.61 m) high, each with a semicircular head. The stones are carved with inscriptions flanked by fluted pilasters with moulded capitals.	II
Top Farmhouse; 53.12777°N 1.33758°W	—	Late 18th century	The farmhouse is in stone, a side wall is in brick, and it has dentilled eaves bands and a slate roof. There are two storeys and an L-shaped plan, with a front range of two bays, and an earlier lower rear wing with three bays. On the front are sash windows with segmental heads, at the rear is a gabled porch, and the windows are casements.	II
St Werburgh's Church; 53.12101°N 1.33803°W		1827–28	Other than the tower, the church was rebuilt in 1878–79. It is built in stone with slate roofs, and consists of a nave, a south porch, a chancel with a north vestry, and a west tower. The tower has three stages, and contains a west doorway with a chamfered surround and a pointed head, above which is a window with Y-tracery, clock faces on all sides, bell openings with Y-tracery, a stepped eaves band, and an embattled parapet with crocketed corner pinnacles.	II
