= Tibshelf Town railway station =

Former railway station in Derbyshire, England

Coordinates: 53.1405°N 1.3440°W

Tibshelf Town
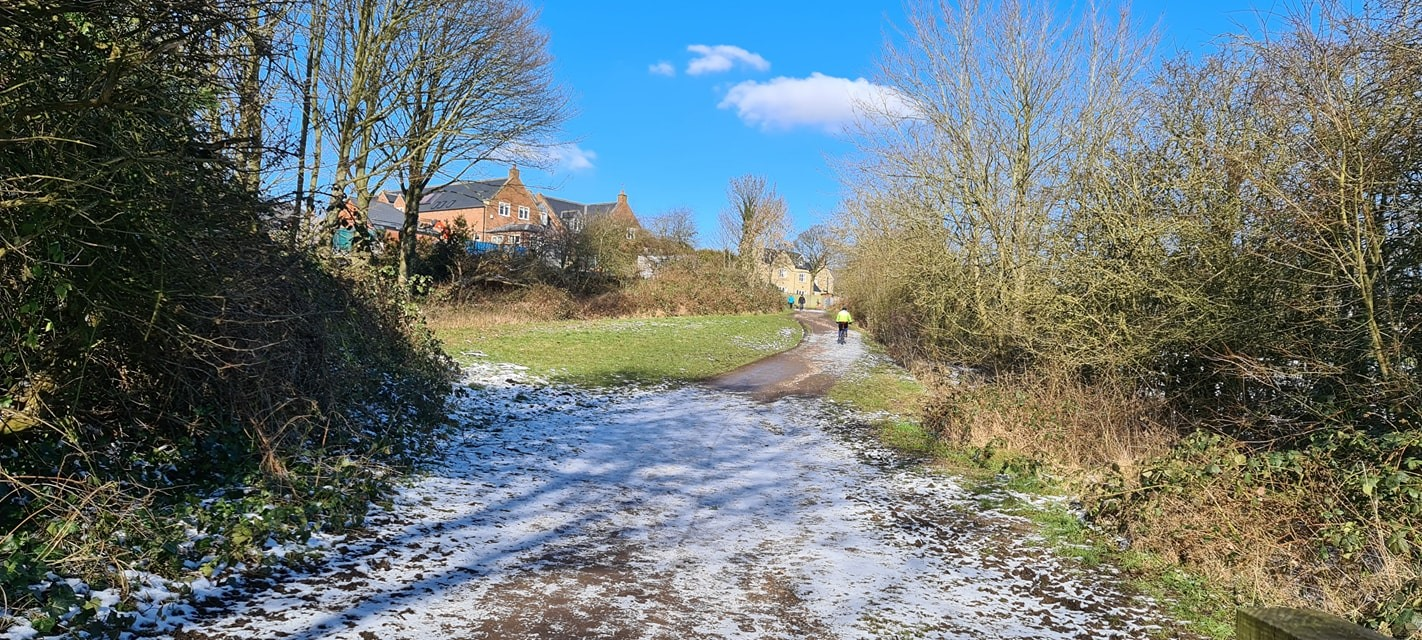
- The station site in 2021

General information
- Location: Tibshelf, Derbyshire, England
- Platforms: 2

Other information
- Status: Disused

History
- Original company: Manchester, Sheffield and Lincolnshire Railway
- Pre-grouping: Great Central Railway
- Post-grouping: London and North Eastern Railway

Key dates
- 2 January 1893: Opened
- 4 March 1963: Closed
Location

Tibshelf Town railway station is a disused station on the former Great Central Main Line in the village of Tibshelf in Derbyshire, England.

== History ==
The station was opened on 2 January 1893 by the Manchester, Sheffield and Lincolnshire Railway (later part of the Great Central Railway; it became subsequently the LNER on its line from Beighton, on the outskirts of Sheffield, to Annesley in Nottinghamshire, which later became part of the Great Central main line to London. The station was optimistically designated Tibshelf Town, reflecting the village's aspirations to obtain official town status. Tibshelf never did become a town, but the station kept this name throughout its operating life.

The line ran through a mainly industrial landscape dominated by mining. To the north of the station was a deep cutting where a tunnel was originally intended; fears of damage through mining subsidence forced the change in the plans. Tibshelf High Street crossed a bridge over this cutting.

To the south, the line crossed over the Midland Railway's branch line from Westhouses & Blackwell (on the Erewash Valley Line), to Mansfield Woodhouse, just to the east of their own Tibshelf & Newton station. This line closed to passengers on 28 July 1930, but remained in use for freight and coal trains long afterwards. The route is now a footpath but Tibshelf & Newton station still stands.

Tibshelf Town station closed on 4 March 1963 and the line itself on 5 September 1966. The collieries also closed around this time, although coal mining continued to be a major source of employment for the village, with around 2,000 of Tibshelf's inhabitants still working at local pits as late as the 1980s.

== The site today ==
The route of the Great Central line was redeveloped as a recreational route by Derbyshire County Council in the late 1960s and early 1970s, and now forms part of the Five Pits Trail network. These efforts received a Countryside Award in 1970, as indicated by a plaque at nearby Pilsley where the next station northwards was sited.

The trail runs approximately 12 miles, from Tibshelf to Grassmoor Country Park, though with the filling in of cuttings and removal of embankments it is virtually unrecognisable as a former railway line. Similarly the collieries that had once been such conspicuous features of the landscape have vanished without trace. The area is now once again mostly rural in character.

Preceding station	Disused railways	Following station
Pilsley	Great Central Railway; Derbyshire Lines	Kirkby Bentick
