= Listed buildings in Tibshelf =

Tibshelf is a civil parish in the Bolsover District of Derbyshire, England. The parish contains three listed buildings that are recorded in the National Heritage List for England. All the listed buildings are designated at Grade II, the lowest of the three grades, which is applied to "buildings of national importance and special interest". The parish contains the village of Tibshelf, and the surrounding area, and the listed buildings consist of a church and two houses.

== Buildings ==
Name and location	Photograph	Date	Notes
Church of St John the Baptist; 53.14323°N 1.34275°W		15th century	The oldest part of the church is the tower, with the body of the church designed by Bodley and Garner added in 1887–88. The chancel was replaced following a fire, and the south aisle was added, in 1910. The church is built in stone with roofs of lead and slate, and it consists of a nave, north and south aisles, a south porch, a chancel with a chapel and a hall to the north, and a west tower. The tower is in Perpendicular style, with two stages, diagonal buttresses, a west doorway with a pointed head, a moulded surround, and a hood mould, over which is a three-light Perpendicular window. In the upper stage are clock faces on the north and south sides, two-light bell openings with hood moulds, an eaves string course with two gargoyles, and embattled parapets with corner and central piers with finials.
The Cottage; 53.13823°N 1.34831°W	—	Early 18th century	The house is in sandstone with a thatched roof. There is a single storey and attics, and three bays. The windows are mullioned, and there is a central eyebrow dormer.
32 High Street; 53.14043°N 1.34724°W	—	Late 18th to early 19th century	The house is in sandstone with painted stone dressings and a slate roof. There are two storeys and two bays. The central doorway has a flush surround, above it is a single-light window, and the other windows are mullioned with two lights.
