= Frederick Gent School =

Location
- Mansfield Road; South Normanton, Derbyshire, DE55 2ER; England; 53°05′58″N 1°19′56″W

Information
- Type: Academy
- Established: 1958
- Local authority: Derbyshire
- Trust: The Two Counties Trust
- Department for Education URN: 145109 Tables
- Ofsted: Reports
- Headteacher: Chris Woollard
- Deputy head: Mike Bradshaw
- Gender: Co-educational
- Age: 11 to 16
- Enrolment: 763
- Website: https://www.frederickgent.ttct.co.uk/

The Frederick Gent Comprehensive School is a co-educational secondary school located on Mansfield Road (B6019) in South Normanton in the Bolsover district of Derbyshire.

== History ==
It was built in 1958 to replace the secondary schools of Kirkstead in Pinxton (which became a junior school called Kirkstead Junior Academy on Kirkstead Road) and New Street Secondary Modern in South Normanton. It is less than 200 metres from junction 28 of the M1. The school was rebuilt in a £13.2M programme between July 2003 and December 2004.

Previously a community school administered by Derbyshire County Council, in November 2017 Frederick Gent School converted to academy status. The school is now sponsored by The Two Counties Trust.

== Admissions ==
The school provides secondary education for pupils aged 11 – 16.

Frederick Gent has a good and growing reputation as an innovative, high-achieving school with a well-ordered, caring and secure environment in which all youngsters can learn with confidence. This was recognised by the school being designated as one of the first Leading Edge Schools. In the last few years the school has been transformed by moving into new buildings, becoming a Specialist Mathematics and ICT School in April 2004 and obtaining Artsmark Gold.

The previous headteacher was Julie Broadbent, who replaced Martyn Cooper at the end of the 2012/13 academic year.

== Academic performance ==
The school gets very good GCSE results, with a rising trend.
