= Tibshelf services =

Service area on the M1 motorway, England

Tibshelf Services
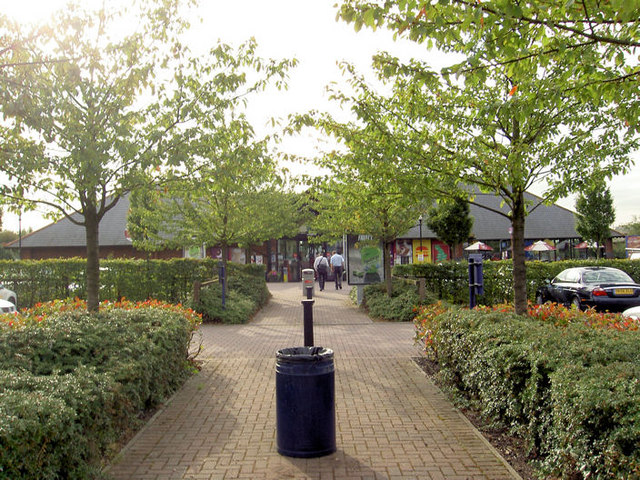
- The southbound services building

- Location in Derbyshire, England Location on the UK motorway network

Information
- County: Derbyshire
- Road: M1
- Coordinates: 53°08′13″N 1°19′54″W
- Operator: Roadchef
- Date opened: 16 April 1999
- Website: www.roadchef.com/locations/tibshelf-northbound

Tibshelf services is a motorway service area operated by Roadchef between junctions 28 and 29 of the M1 motorway in Derbyshire, England.

== Geography ==
The site is near Tibshelf Ponds and the Five Pits Trail and lies around 2/3 mile (1.1 km) south-east of the village of Tibshelf, but the north-bound site is closer to the village of Newton.

== History ==
Swayfields Ltd, of Lincoln, with Texaco, applied for planning to Bolsover District Council in December 1994. In November 1997 Welcome Break Group put in a full planning application for a dual motorway site; it had been given outline planning in July 1995. In July 1998 Roadchef put in a planning application.

During the planning of the site it was originally named Chesterfield services.

=== Construction ===
In November 1998 construction started on the slip roads. It was built by Rotrax of Derby.

During its archaeological evaluation Bronze Age flints and pottery were discovered - indicating the potential of Bronze Age enclosures in the surrounding area.

=== Opening ===
It was to open in late March 1999, but opened in mid-April 1999.

== Facilities ==
The northbound side was refurbished in 2015, with a McDonald's, a Fresh Food Cafe and a Costa.

| Next southbound: Trowell | Motorway service stations on the M1 motorway | Next northbound: Woodall |
