= Pilsley railway station =

Former railway station in Derbyshire, England

Coordinates: 53.1572°N 1.3588°W

Pilsley
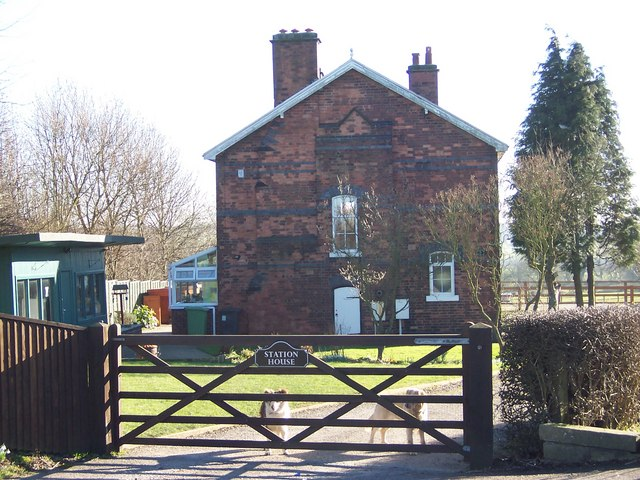

General information
- Location: Pilsley, Derbyshire, England
- Platforms: 2

Other information
- Status: Disused

History
- Original company: Manchester, Sheffield and Lincolnshire Railway
- Pre-grouping: Great Central Railway
- Post-grouping: London and North Eastern Railway

Key dates
- 2 January 1893: Opened
- 2 November 1959: Closed
Location

Pilsley railway station is a disused station which served the village of Pilsley in Derbyshire, England. It was on the Great Central Main Line.

== History ==
The station was opened on 2 January 1893 by the Manchester, Sheffield and Lincolnshire Railway (later part of the Great Central Railway and subsequently the LNER), on its line from Beighton in the outskirts of Sheffield to Annesley in Nottinghamshire, which later became part of the Great Central main line to London.

Along much of the route between Sheffield and Nottingham the line ran through a mainly industrial landscape dominated by mining. Pilsley had its own colliery a short distance to the north of the station, with extensive sidings on both sides of the main line. The Midland Railway also gained access to Pilsley colliery, via a section about 2.5 miles in length which branched off their Erewash Valley Line just to the north of Doe Hill station, and ran across country to join the Great Central at Pilsley, running virtually alongside Pilsley station before making its connection with the line near the colliery.

Pilsley station closed on 2 November 1959, the line itself on 5 September 1966. The collieries also closed around this time, although coal mining continued to be a source of employment for the village until the 1980s.

The route of the Great Central line was redeveloped by Derbyshire County Council in the late 1960s and early 1970s, and now forms part of the Five Pits Trail network. These efforts received a Countryside Award in 1970, as indicated by a plaque at the site of Pilsley station. The trail runs approximately 12 miles, from Tibshelf to Grassmoor Country Park, though with the filling in of cuttings and removal of embankments it is virtually unrecognisable as a former railway line. Similarly the collieries that had once been such conspicuous features of the landscape have vanished without trace. The area is now once again mostly rural in character.

Preceding station	Disused railways	Following station
Heath	Great Central Railway; Derbyshire Lines	Tibshelf Town
