= Tom Hulatt =

English runner (1930-1990)

- Derbyshire champion

Personal information
- Born: 7 September 1930 Derbyshire, England
- Died: 21 May 1990 (aged 59)

Sport
- Sport: Running
- Event: 1 mile

William Thomas Hulatt (7 September 1930 – 21 May 1990) was an English athlete notable for finishing third behind Sir Christopher Chataway in the historic race in which Sir Roger Bannister ran the first sub-four-minute mile on 6 May 1954. He was from a working-class family and the only runner in the race who was not a university student.

== Life ==
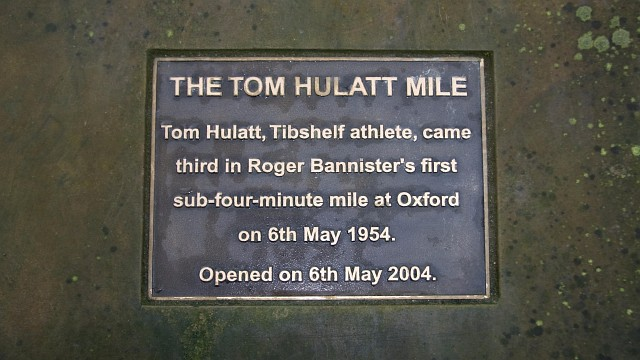
The Tom Hulatt Mile

Hulatt was born in Tibshelf, Derbyshire, and after leaving school he joined the army but bought himself out. He worked as a miner at Williamthorpe Colliery and he would run five miles there and back each day. He also worked as a council rat catcher and in his spare time he ran for Alfreton Athletics Club, Chesterfield Harriers, Hallamshire Harriers, and London Polytechnic. He was the Derbyshire and Northern Counties One Mile Champion in 1953 and 1954.

== The four-minute mile ==
The historic four-minute mile event took place during a meet between British AAA and Oxford University at Iffley Road Track in Oxford and was watched by about 3,000 spectators. Bannister's time was 3 minutes 59.4 seconds and Hulatt recorded a time of 4 minutes and 16 seconds. Hulatt ran in the same AAA team as Bannister, Chris Chataway and Chris Brasher but Chataway and Brasher were pacing Bannister in order to help Bannister break the record. Hulatt was told before the race by Bannister to run his own race and he was not involved in the pacing. Hulatt was not interviewed after the race and he returned home with his brother with a programme signed by Bannister, Chataway and Brasher.

Hulatt suffered an Achilles tendon injury in 1960, and in his later years he did some coaching, but only ran at the annual Tibshelf Horticultural Show. He died aged 59 and was buried in the grounds of St. John the Baptist Church, Tibshelf. On the fiftieth anniversary of his run, a one mile stretch of the Five Pits Trail was designed as the 'Tom Hulatt Mile' identified by two marker stones, with inscribed plaques, in coal measures sandstone donated by the National Trust.
