= South Normanton =

Village in Derbyshire, England

Coordinates: 53.107°N 1.343°W

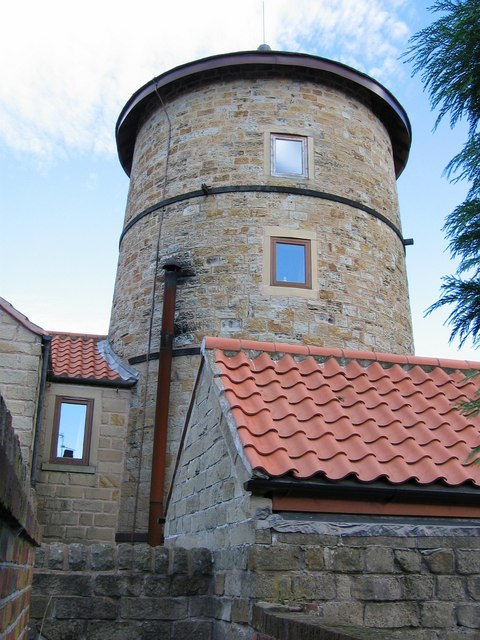
- A windmill conversion off Fordbridge Lane

- Location within Derbyshire
- Population: 9,445 (2011)
- OS grid reference: SK467592
- District: Bolsover
- Shire county: Derbyshire
- Region: East Midlands
- Country: England
- Sovereign state: United Kingdom
- Post town: Alfreton
- Postcode district: DE55
- Dialling code: 01773
- Police: Derbyshire
- Fire: Derbyshire
- Ambulance: East Midlands
- UK Parliament: Bolsover

South Normanton is a village and civil parish in the Bolsover District of Derbyshire, England. The population at the 2011 Census was 9,445. An ex-mining village, it is two miles (three kilometres) east of Alfreton. The historic industries of the village were agriculture, stocking, spinning and mining. Normanton means 'the farm of the north men' or 'Northwegans'.

South Normanton Colliery closed in 1952, B Winning in 1964 and A Winning in 1969. Carnfield Hall was for several centuries the seat of the Revel family.

== History ==
Before 1888 South Normanton was a small hamlet concerned with farming activities. There were very few buildings in the area and only a small track road leading to the settlement.

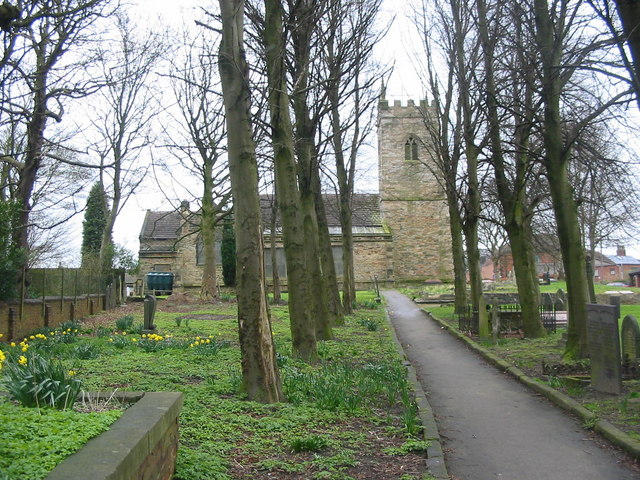
St. Michael's Church

Around 1888 the only houses that were there were a few cottages around the church of St Michael, on the hilltop in South Normanton Centre and the Windmill. The church was also there of course. All the settlement and buildings at this point were clustered around the main road along the roadsides of what is now Church Street and Market Street (a linear settlement). There were farming fields around the arched shaped village.

Around 1921 the village began its main industry of mining. Many people moved in from the surrounding countryside to work in the mines. The wages they earned were better than the crops that they grew in the fields as security so they came to the village in their hundreds. Many terraced houses were built to accommodate them. These were small and cheap housing for the poor people that came, the streets around Peel Street, South Street and Albert Street. More houses were built on Berristow Lane and Carter Lane East. At this time there was one infant school called Hamlet Lane School. The population of the village grew dramatically. Notice on the 1921 map that the 'hamlet' remains.

Around 1957 the government and councils of Britain were concerned about the lot of poor people in the country and began a house building programme to improve the housing. In South Normanton New Street and Hilcote Street were built (new street shows up on the 1880 to 1888 map of south normanton and hilcote st shows up on the 1900 map along with half of downing street) along with King Street and other such areas. Schools were built to educate the children of the villagers and shops sprang up to serve the community. At the same time some houses were beginning to spring up along the main roads of Market Street and Mansfield Road. The schools included; Glebe Junior School, New Street Secondary School, Green Infant School and Brigg Infant School. In the period after the Second World War the council built an estate to give some of the residents of South Normanton the chance to rent very high quality housing. This was known as council housing. The streets in South Normanton that were built were along Lansbury Drive. The secondary school (Frederick Gent School) was built in 1959 and also helped cater for the growing population.

After the 1980s there had been a huge infilling around South Normanton. The areas of Broadmeadows, Rippon Homes and newer housing areas were built. These were higher cost housing for the private market. Major roads had also been built including the M1 motorway creating easier access to the village and surrounding area for car owners. The East Midlands Designer Outlet (owned by McArthurGlen Group) is located near the edge of the settlement close to the M1.

== Sport ==
South Normanton has some sporting facilities.

The village is home to South Normanton Athletic F.C. who currently play in United Counties League Division One. The town also has many Sunday and Saturday teams such as Carnfield F.C., a Grassroots Football Charter Standard Club (South Normanton Albion Football Club, catering for Under 7s to under 17s), and a Mini Colts soccer skills group.

A few footballers from the village went on to play professionally, such as Lee Holmes (formerly of Derby County), Jordan Smith (Nottingham Forest) and Chris Martin (formerly of Nottingham Forest and Port Vale).

South Normanton is also home to the South Normanton School of Boxing catering for all ages from 10 upwards; the South Normanton Cricket Club was formed in 1990; and the South Normanton Cycling Club most commonly known as 'SNCC'.

== Notable residents ==
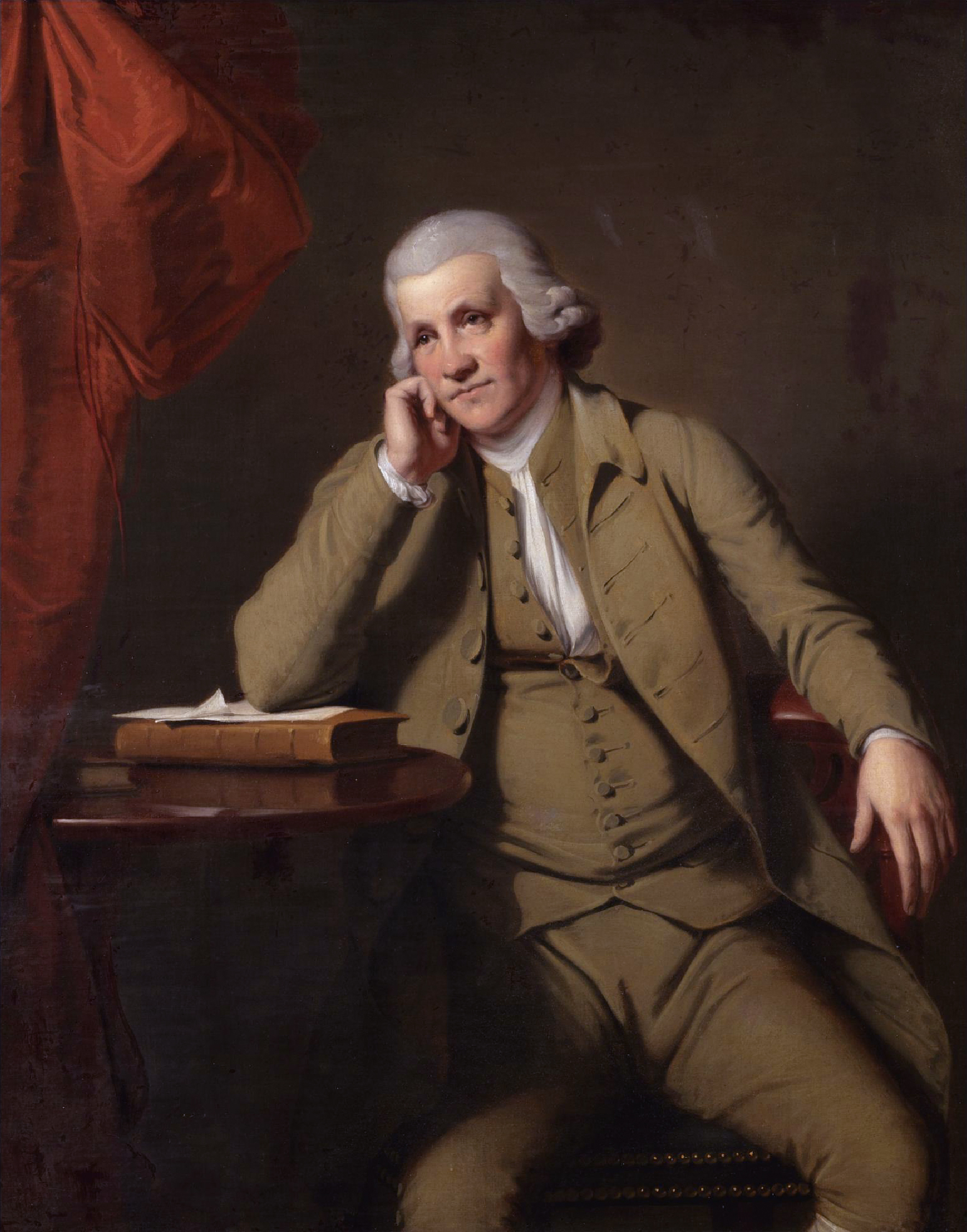
Portrait of Jedediah Strutt by Joseph Wright of Derby, 1790

- Margaret Miles-Bramwell (1948–2025) was brought up here. She founded Slimming World
- Jedediah Strutt (1726–1797), a hosier and cotton spinner, was born here.
- Percy Toplis (1896–1920), a criminal and imposter, was born here. He was the inspiration for The Monocled Mutineer, a 1986 BBC TV drama
- Prof Thomas Malcolm Charlton (1923–1997), civil engineer and historian, a great lover of railways and railway engines, was born here.

=== Sport ===
- Arthur Roe (1892–1960), footballer who played 183 games, beginning with 132 for Luton Town
- Lee Holmes (born 1987), footballer, played 335 games, beginning with 46 for Derby County, grew up locally.
- Jordan Smith (born 1994), football goalkeeper, played over 180 games beginning with 47 at Nottingham Forest
- Max Lowe (born 1997), footballer who has played over 190 games, beginning with 42 for Derby County

== See also ==
- Listed buildings in South Normanton
- Pinxton Castle
