= Thomas Malcolm Charlton =

British civil engineer and historian

Thomas Malcolm Charlton FRSE (1 September 1923 – 1 February 1997) was a British civil engineer and historian. He is remembered for several notable textbooks on structural issues. He was a great lover of railways and railway engines.

== Life ==
He was born on 1 September 1923, in South Normanton, Derbyshire, the son of William Charlton, a mining engineer, and Emily May Wellbank. His early education was at Doncaster Grammar School and then Doncaster Technical College.

His university education began at London University, graduating BSc in 1943, but was the interrupted by the Second World War, which also caused a relocation of studies to University College Nottingham (under Prof C H Bulleid). After graduating, he was then interviewed by C.P. Snow for a position as a Junior Scientific Officer in what became the Royal Radar Establishment at Great Malvern, and took up this position.

In 1946, Charlton began work as an engineer and technical advisor in Newcastle. He stayed there for eight years. In 1954, Cambridge University offered him a lectureship and he moved there with his young family. The university granted him an honorary MA degree in the same year. In 1963, he was offered a Professorship by Queen's University Belfast, and accepted, finding this a much more comfortable position. At Queen's, he became a member of many university committees, including the Buildings and General Policy Committee. In this role he condemned the concrete of university halls of residence, then under construction, as substandard, leading to their demolition. During the civil unrest in Northern Ireland he was asked to sit on the six person Advisory Council to the Ulster Defence Regiment under the chairmanship of General Sir John Anderson.

In 1970, Aberdeen University offered him a chair and he was Professor of Engineering there until he retired. An invitation to act as a visiting lecturer to Finland led to his being elected a Foreign Member of the Finnish Academy of Sciences. In 1973 he was elected a Fellow of the Royal Society of Edinburgh.

After his retirement in 1979, he moved with his wife to Burwell, Cambridgeshire and continued to write. He died at Burwell on 1 February 1997.

== Family ==
He married Valerie McCulloch in 1950. They had two sons: Richard who became a minister and Edward who joined the RAF.

== Publications ==
See

- Model Analysis of Structure (1954)
- Hydro-electric Engineering Practice (1958)
- Energy Principles in Applied Statics (1959)
- Principles of Structural Analysis (1969)
- Energy Theory in the Principles of Structures (1973)
- The Works of I K Brunel (1976)
- A History of the Theory of Structures in the Nineteenth Century (1982)
- Professor Emeritus (an autobiography) (1991)
