= Pinxton Castle =

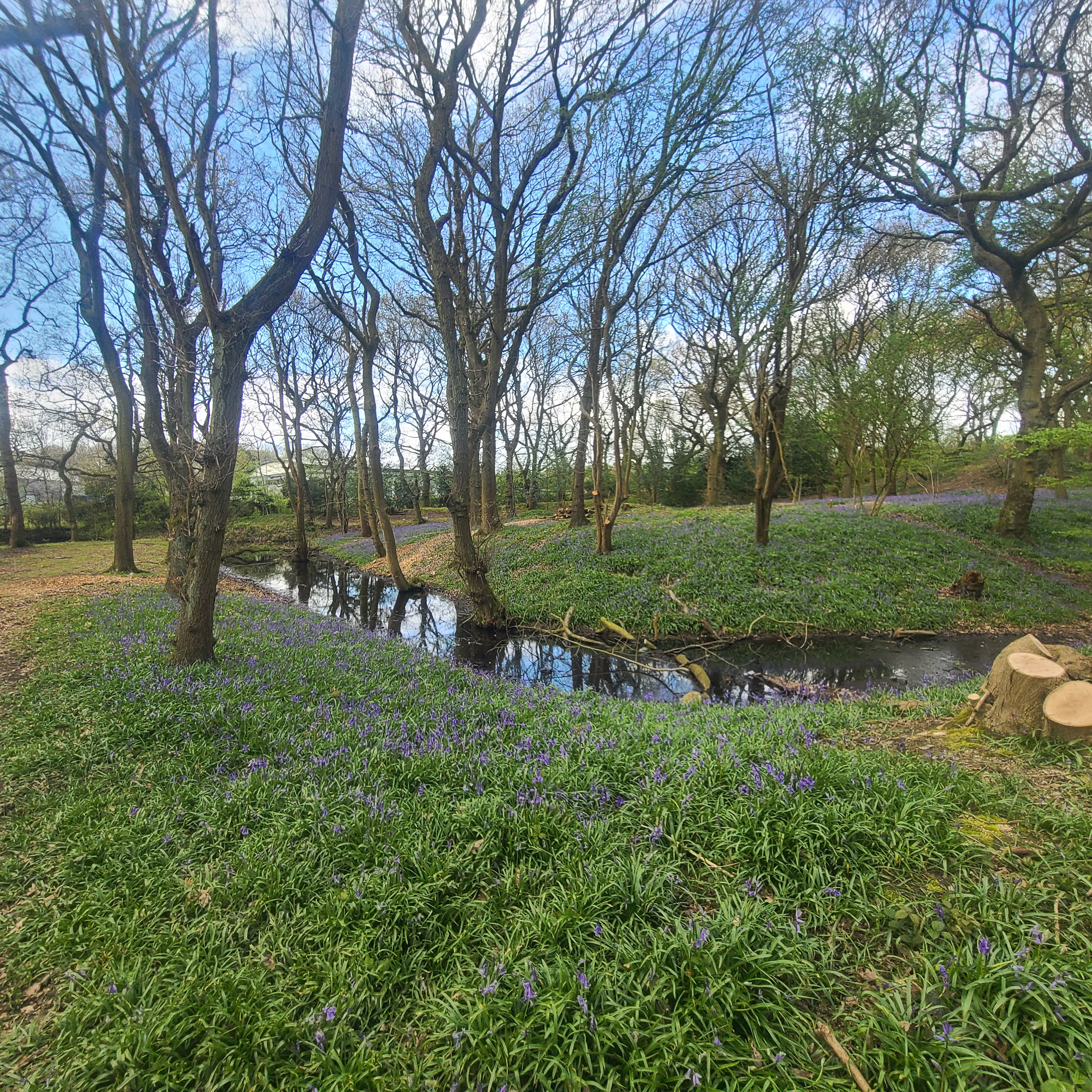
- Remnants of the moat

- Location within Derbyshire
- 53°06′26″N 1°18′54″W
- Type: Archaeological site
- Location: Between Pinxton and South Normanton, Derbyshire

Scheduled monument
- Official name: Pinxton Castle motte and fortified manor with moated site and five fishponds
- Designated: 25 February 1994
- Reference no.: 1010025

Pinxton Castle, Derbyshire, is a scheduled monument in Castle Wood that straddles Pinxton and South Normanton. In its designation as a scheduled monument, Historic England describes it as having been a motte and fortified manor, with a moated site and five fishponds. Unlike most of the approximately 600 moated sites in England, a large, fortified enclosure surrounded the moat.

== History ==
The castle is believed to have been built in the early 12th century CE. It is also known locally as Wynn's Castle, although no known documentary references survive to link anyone to the site. The manors of Pinxton and South Normanton were granted by the De Alfreton family to Ralph le Poer (who was still living in 1242). A marriage to his heiress brought them under the control of several generations of the De Wynn or Le Wyne family. Around 1340, John le Wyne was involved in a legal battle to recover fines levied upon him by the officers of Sherwood Forest for grazing cattle in Fulwood, just over the Nottinghamshire border. The manors were sold by William le Wyne in 1342.

In the late 19th century, a coal mine, South Normanton Colliery, was developed neighbouring the site to the east. It was served by a branch from the old Great Central Railway line, which ended directly next to the castle.

The history and purpose of the site are uncertain. The earliest coverage of the site is an article, dated 1918, in the Derbyshire Archaeological Journal by William Stevenson. It was listed as a scheduled monument by Historic England in 1994. In 2022 the site was included on the organisation's Heritage at Risk Register. The report concluded that the general condition of the site was "unsatisfactory" due to threats from unconstrained vegetation growth, although it noted that the overall position was improving. The castle site remained on the register in 2023.

== Description ==
The Pinxton site consists of a motte about 3 metres (9.8 ft) high; perimeter earthworks; some evidence, likely of a later date, of the walls and floors of a number of small buildings; the remains of a moat; and five fish ponds. Historic England suggests that the motte was the keep of a "12th century earthwork castle" and that the site was subsequently repurposed as a "medieval fortified manor". The motte would have been encircled by an outer bailey, with ancillary buildings including pens for livestock, and the whole surrounded by a defensive ditch and a palisade. Such castles were favoured by the Normans, as their use of natural, readily available materials – earth, timber, and some stone – and their simple design allowed them to be constructed quickly and cheaply by a relatively unskilled labour force. (Note: Some 600 such motte castle and motte-and-bailey castle sites have been identified across Britain.) (Note: The Bayeux Tapestry includes a panel depicting the construction of the motte-and-bailey castle at Hastings.)

Archaeological evidence suggests that later builders reused the motte and some of its surrounding features as part of a defensive system around a medieval fortified manor house. The motte site itself may have been converted to a gatehouse. A wall, which may have been crenellated, would have surrounded part of the site. (Note: If it had been crenellated, that might be why the site was called a castle; see Licence to crenellate.) The moated area consists of a platform, roughly 30 by 40 metres (98 by 131 ft) square, encircled by a moat which is 8 metres (26 ft) wide and between 1 and 2 metres (3.3 and 6.6 ft) deep. The positioning is unusual, in that the moat sits within the outer fortifications, rather than itself forming the outer perimeter. Five fishponds, ranging in size up to 40 metres (130 ft) long and 1.5 metres (4.9 ft) deep, were created as a source of food. Some of the ponds, along with the moat, remain partially filled with water.

== Archaeology and excavations ==
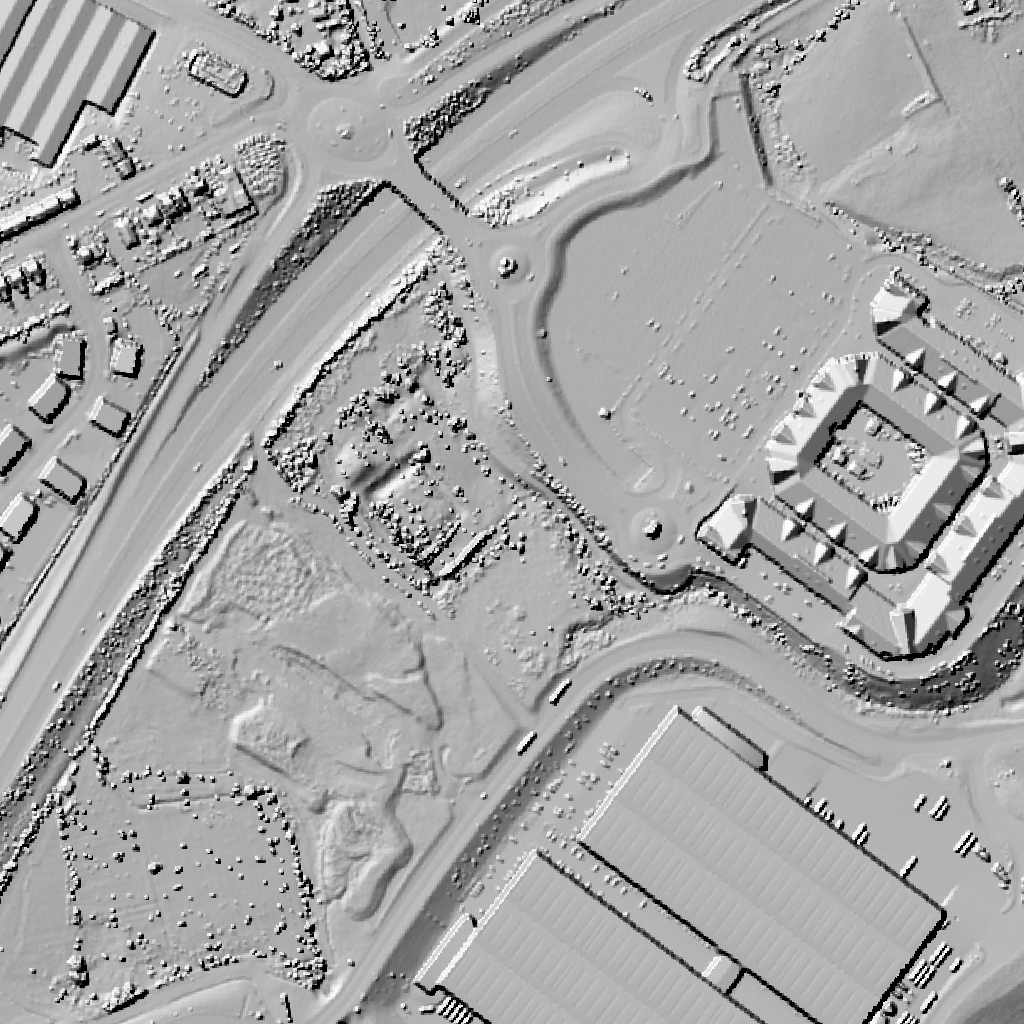
Lidar map of Castle Wood

Stevenson describes as oblong what he calls "a castle or earthwork" shown on an Ordnance Survey map. He suggests that its bailey was defended by a wet ditch and that long residence explained the ground disturbance. He also suggests that a "hastily made" first and second bailey might have existed. The motte itself is described as an imperfect cone, the core of which was meant to be a motte or mound built to protect the castle. He considered the site to be part of a line of forts constructed by King John before he became king.

G. E. Monk described excavations conducted by the Pinxton Archaeological Society in 1950 and 1951, remarking that Stevenson's 1918 description was "somewhat inconclusive". The 1950 excavation dug a trench on the western side of the inner bailey. A stone wall was uncovered with a corner stone at the north end, and digging continued at right angles. There were post holes along the wall, indications of a timber building. Ground conditions made them discontinue the dig in 1952. An eastern, less well-defined wall had been located by trenches, and plans were made to finish the outside excavations by 1952.

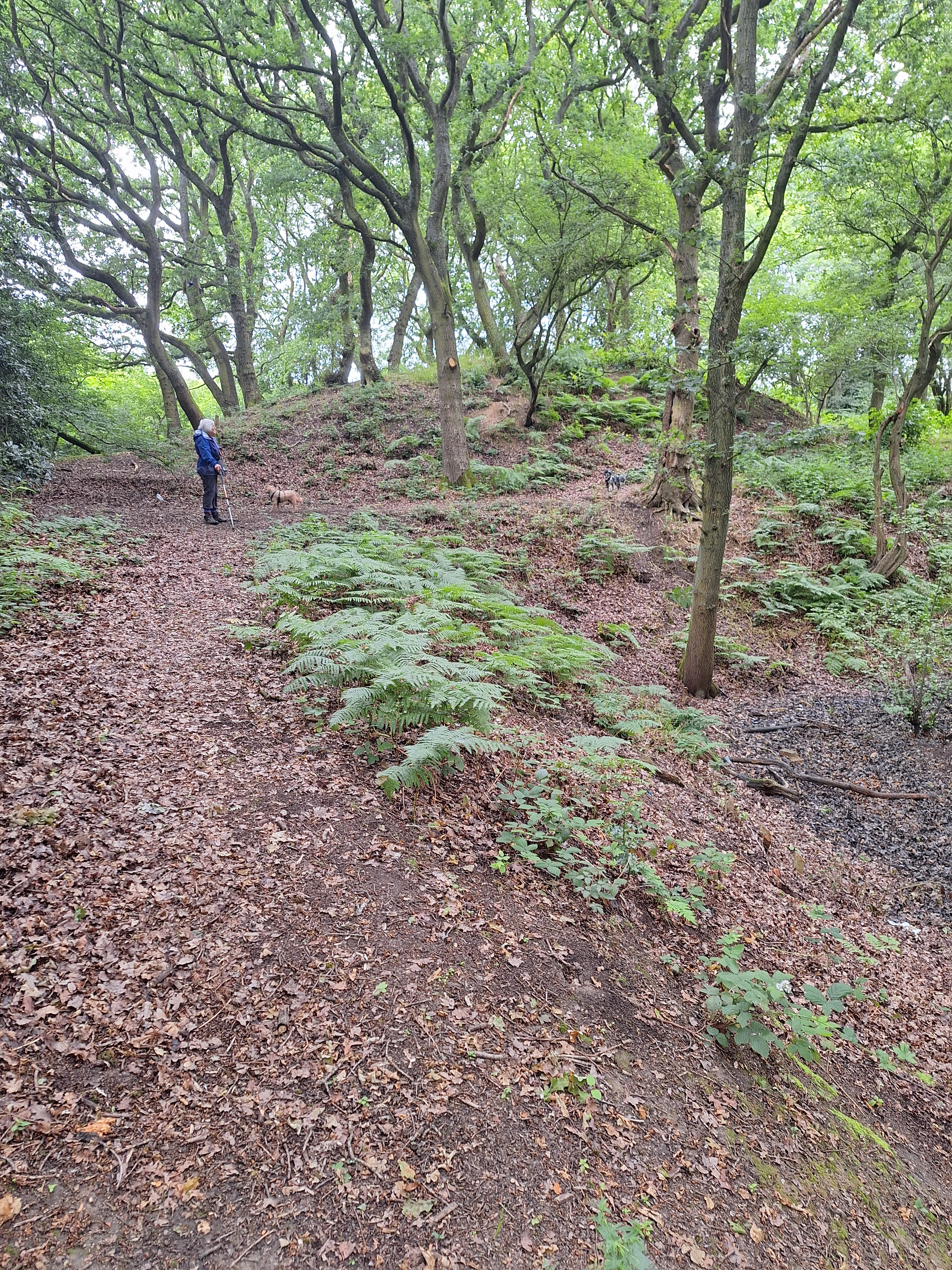
Remnants of part of the motte

A building about 9 by 7 metres (30 by 23 ft) was tentatively identified, accompanied by late-14th-century pottery and tiles found in the trenches. A variety of roofing stone was found, including glazed and unglazed tiles. The ridge tiles that were found were serrated and were in several glaze colours, two shades of brown and grey-green. Every trench had fragments of pottery, but no complete pots. Glazing was found both inside and outside the pots. A 2.34 metres (7.7 ft) by 1.5 metres (4.9 ft) stone platform was found on the northeast side of the inner bailey. One side had no clear boundary, with the other sides being made of neatly laid bevelled stones. Trenches held roofing tiles, pottery, and a sandstone capital dated to around 1150. Tree roots made stratification impossible, although the pottery was found at more or less the same levels, with roofing tiles inside and outside the wall found at varying depths. No floor level was found.

In 1959, an inspector described the excavations by the Pinxton Archaeological Society as "not of a scientific nature", and also remarked that Sir Mortimer Wheeler looked at some potsherds during a casual visit to the site, identifying them as 14th century. The inspector further noted the lack of any documentary evidence for the site and suggested that it was "the residence of a local officer of Sherwood Forest as it is strategically placed at the edge of the forest".

In 1993, examination of four fields south of Pinxton Castle retrieved a disappointing number of finds. Of the 80 objects collected, only 20 were medieval. None of these was found within 100 metres (330 ft) of Pinxton Castle.

== Sources ==
- Pounds, Norman John Greville (1994). The Medieval Castle in England and Wales: A Political and Social History. Cambridge: Cambridge University Press. ISBN 978-0-521-45828-3. OCLC 59908863.
