= Jack Bradford (footballer) =

English footballer

Personal information
- Full name: John Bradford
- Date of birth: 9 April 1895
- Place of birth: Pilsley, North East Derbyshire, England
- Date of death: 1969 (aged 73–74)
- Height: 5 ft 7 1/2 in (1.71 m)
- Position: Defender

Senior career*
Years	Team	Apps	(Gls)
1920–1924	Grimsby Town	108	(0)
1924–1927	Wolverhampton Wanderers	77	(0)
- Bournemouth & Boscombe Athletic
- * Club domestic league appearances and goals

John Bradford (9 April 1895 – 1969) was an English footballer who played in the Football League for Grimsby Town, Wolverhampton Wanderers and Bournemouth & Boscombe Athletic.

== Career ==
Bradford made over 100 appearances for Grimsby Town between 1920 and 1924 in Division Three (North), before joining Wolverhampton Wanderers in 1924.

He made his Wolves debut on 29 March 1924 in a 3–0 win over Barrow, one of two appearances during this season which ended with promotion back to the Second Division at the first attempt.

He made 40 appearances for the Midlanders during the 1924-25 season but only appeared occasionally in the following two campaigns before moving to Bournemouth & Boscombe Athletic in 1927.

He died in 1969.
