= 2023 Bolsover District Council election =

2023 English local election

- May 4, 2023

All 37 seats to Bolsover District Council 19 seats needed for a majority
- Registered: 61,655
	First party	Second party
	LAB	CON
Leader	Steve Fritchley	David Dixon
Party	Labour	Conservative
Leader's seat	Langwith	Barlborough (lost seat)
Last election	18 seats, 46.1%	2 seats, 11.1%
Seats before	20	3
Seats won	31	3
Seat change	▲13	▲1
Popular vote	16,720	9,343
Percentage	48.8%	27.2%
Swing	▲2.7%	▲16.1%
	Third party	Fourth party
	IND	LDM
Party	Independent	Liberal Democrats
Last election	16 seats, 35.0%	1 seat, 5.4%
Seats before	14 (Note: Including one vacant seat in Clowne West ward previously held by independent councillor Dan Salt until his removal from the council in December 2022 for non-attendance. Of the independent councillors, nine sat together as the "Independent Group" led by Deborah Watson, three formed the "Community Independents" led by Ross Walker (which group had also included Dan Salt prior to his removal) and one councillor was not aligned to any group.)	0
Seats won	3	0
Seat change	▼13	▼1
Popular vote	7,307	250
Percentage	21.3%	0.7%
Swing	▼13.7%	▼4.7%
- Winner of each seat at the 2023 Bolsover District Council election
Leader before election
Steve Fritchley
Labour
Leader after election
Steve Fritchley
Labour

The 2023 Bolsover District Council election took place on 4 May 2023, to elect all 37 members of Bolsover District Council in Derbyshire, England. This was on the same day as other local elections across England.

== Summary ==
=== Overview ===
Following the results, the council remained under Labour control.

=== Election result ===
2023 Bolsover District Council election
Party	Candidates	Seats	Gains	Losses	Net gain/loss	Seats %	Votes %	Votes	+/−
Labour	37	31	13	0	▲13	83.8	48.8	16,720	+2.7
Conservative	37	3	3	2	▲1	8.1	27.2	9,343	+16.1
Independent	29	3	0	13	▼13	8.1	21.3	7,307	–13.7
TUSC	7	0	0	0	Steady	0.0	1.1	380	New
Liberal Democrats	4	0	0	0	▼1	0.0	0.7	250	–4.7
Green	2	0	0	0	Steady	0.0	0.5	175	New
Reform	1	0	0	0	Steady	0.0	0.3	117	New

== Ward results ==
The results for each ward were as follows, with an asterisk (*) indicating a sitting councillor standing for re-election.

=== Ault Hucknall ===
Ault Hucknall
Party	Candidate	Votes	%	±%
Labour	Thomas Kirkham*	689	50.1	+8.6
Labour	Malcolm Ritchie	658	47.9	+3.1
Labour	Catherine Tite	592	43.1	+7.7
Conservative	Andrew Hunt	449	32.7	+4.0
Conservative	Karen Whitaker	442	32.2	N/A
Conservative	Iain Grainger-Grimes	439	32.0	N/A
Independent	Sarah Bister	361	26.3	N/A
Majority		143	2.7	
Rejected ballots		5	0.36	
Turnout		1,379	28.32	+3.00
Registered electors		4,869		
Labour gain from Independent		Swing		
Labour hold		Swing		
Labour hold		Swing		

One seat shown as a gain from independent to allow for comparison with 2019 results, although the independent elected in 2019, Liz Smyth, had subsequently joined Labour during 2021. She did not stand for re-election.

=== Barlborough ===
Barlborough
Party	Candidate	Votes	%	±%
Labour	James Haywood	510	45.2	+8.4
Labour	Vicki Wapplington	471	41.7	+7.6
Conservative	Maxine Dixon*	458	40.6	−1.4
Conservative	David Dixon*	436	38.6	−1.0
Independent	John Shaw	185	16.4	−5.8
Liberal Democrats	Alan Stanley	80	7.1	−3.7
Majority		13	1.1	
Rejected ballots		10	0.88	
Turnout		1,139	33.68	+1.06
Registered electors		3,384		
Labour gain from Conservative		Swing		
Labour gain from Conservative		Swing		

=== Blackwell ===
Blackwell
Party	Candidate	Votes	%	±%
Labour	Clive Moesby*	495	50.5	+11.7
Labour	Sally Renshaw	402	41.0	+9.8
Independent	Debbie Marshall-Curtis	306	31.2	−6.3
Independent	Dexter Bullock*	296	30.2	−18.0
Conservative	Jane Halford	148	15.1	N/A
Conservative	Darren Keyworth	140	14.3	N/A
Majority		96	9.8	
Rejected ballots		4	0.41	
Turnout		984	28.82	−5.56
Registered electors		3,410		
Labour gain from Independent		Swing		
Labour hold		Swing		

=== Bolsover East ===
Bolsover East
Party	Candidate	Votes	%	±%
Labour	Anne Clarke*	507	53.0	−13.0
Labour	Rowan Clarke*	436	45.6	−13.9
Conservative	Joel Fletcher-Swindlehurst	303	31.7	−3.1
Independent	Paul Goodwin	246	25.7	N/A
Conservative	Richard Pinder	226	23.6	N/A
TUSC	Daniel Jackson	62	6.5	N/A
Majority		133	13.9	
Rejected ballots		10	1.04	
Turnout		966	26.88	+1.38
Registered electors		3,576		
Labour hold		Swing		
Labour hold		Swing		

=== Bolsover North and Shuttlewood ===
Bolsover North and Shuttlewood
Party	Candidate	Votes	%	±%
Labour	Donna Hales*	492	72.7	+17.9
Labour	Ashley Taylor	429	63.4	+9.6
Conservative	Nick Gray-Cowley	150	22.2	N/A
Conservative	Alex Webster	136	20.1	N/A
TUSC	Elaine Evans	49	7.2	−37.6
Majority		279	41.2	
Rejected ballots		8	1.17	
Turnout		685	22.99	+2.10
Registered electors		2,976		
Labour hold		Swing		
Labour hold		Swing		

=== Bolsover South ===
Bolsover South
Party	Candidate	Votes	%	±%
Labour	Cathy Jeffery	386	37.8	−1.1
Conservative	Carol Wood	317	31.0	+15.8
Independent	Derek Adams*	314	30.7	−25.3
Labour	Paul Harford	301	29.5	−1.8
Conservative	Chris Wood	271	26.5	N/A
Independent	Nick Clarke	245	24.0	N/A
TUSC	Jon Dale	88	8.6	−2.7
Majority		3	0.3	
Rejected ballots		7	0.68	
Turnout		1,029	31.07	−1.90
Registered electors		3,311		
Labour hold		Swing		
Conservative gain from Independent		Swing		

=== Clowne East ===
Clowne East
Party	Candidate	Votes	%	±%
Labour	David Bennett	547	40.4	+16.7
Labour	Robert Hiney-Saunders	517	38.2	+15.6
Independent	Ross Walker*	504	37.2	−24.1
Independent	Allan Bailey*	469	34.6	−21.5
Labour	Dawn Walton	401	29.6	+7.6
Independent	Glyn Hughes	357	26.3	N/A
Conservative	Natalie Hoy*	343	25.3	−16.9
Conservative	Matt Hoy	320	23.6	+5.6
Conservative	Angela Pogmore	230	17.0	N/A
TUSC	David Watson	47	3.5	N/A
Majority		35	2.6	
Rejected ballots		17	1.24	
Turnout		1,372	29.79	
Registered electors		4,599		
Labour gain from Independent		Swing		
Labour gain from Liberal Democrats		Swing		
Independent hold		Swing		

Natalie Hoy had been elected as a Liberal Democrat in 2019 but joined the Conservatives in 2020. Seat shown as a gain from Liberal Democrats to allow comparison with 2019 results.

=== Clowne West ===
Clowne West
Party	Candidate	Votes	%	±%
Conservative	Will Fletcher	239	54.8	+30.5
Labour	Karl Reid	197	45.2	+12.6
Majority		42	9.6	
Rejected ballots		14	3.11	
Turnout		450	26.88	+0.15
Registered electors		1,675		
Conservative gain from Independent		Swing		

=== Elmton-with-Creswell ===
Elmton-with-Creswell
Party	Candidate	Votes	%	±%
Labour	Rita Turner*	728	54.6	+11.8
Labour	Duncan McGregor*	705	52.8	+6.5
Labour	Amanda Davis	674	50.5	+21.0
Independent	Steve Smith	366	27.4	−2.1
Independent	Martin Saunders	268	20.1	N/A
Conservative	Derek Steff	257	19.3	N/A
Conservative	Terence Edgar	207	15.5	N/A
Conservative	Sarah Smith	195	14.6	N/A
Majority		308	23.1	
Rejected ballots		7	0.52	
Turnout		1,341	26.01	−1.11
Registered electors		5,137		
Labour gain from Independent		Swing		
Labour hold		Swing		
Labour hold		Swing		

=== Langwith ===
Langwith
Party	Candidate	Votes	%	±%
Labour	Sandra Peake*	500	67.8	+67.8
Labour	Stephen Fritchley*	457	61.9	+61.9
Conservative	James Kershaw-Dickson	138	18.7	N/A
Conservative	Carol Patterson	127	17.2	N/A
Liberal Democrats	Gillian Breffit	64	8.7	N/A
Liberal Democrats	Steven Raison	52	7.0	N/A
Majority		319	43.2	
Rejected ballots		3	0.4	
Turnout		741	21.60	N/A
Registered electors		3,427		
Labour hold		Swing		
Labour hold		Swing		

=== Pinxton ===
Pinxton
Party	Candidate	Votes	%	±%
Labour	Mary Dooley*	430	56.4	+17.0
Labour	Mark Hinman*	422	55.3	+18.7
Conservative	Julian Siddle	312	40.9	N/A
Conservative	Kat Moss	254	33.3	N/A
Majority		110	14.4	
Rejected ballots		3	0.39	
Turnout		766	23.58	+0.46
Registered electors		3,250		
Labour hold		Swing		
Labour gain from Independent		Swing		

Mark Hinman won his seat in a by-election in November 2022, but seat shown as gain from independent to allow comparison with 2019 result.

=== Shirebrook North ===
Shirebrook North
Party	Candidate	Votes	%	±%
Labour	Jen Wilson*	411	49.6	−26.4
Labour	Chris Kane*	330	39.9	−24.9
Conservative	Keeley Howson	210	25.4	+4.0
Independent	David Downes	202	24.4	N/A
Conservative	David Taylor	187	22.6	N/A
Green	Martin Gibbons	62	7.5	N/A
TUSC	Ronnie Rogers	62	7.5	N/A
Majority		120	14.5	
Rejected ballots		3	0.36	
Turnout		831	23.72	+3.80
Registered electors		3,497		
Labour hold		Swing		
Labour hold		Swing		

=== Shirebrook South ===
Shirebrook South
Party	Candidate	Votes	%	±%
Labour	Jane Yates	422	55.7	+1.2
Labour	Janet Tait*	412	54.4	+3.1
Conservative	Adam Hind	185	24.4	−7.8
Independent	Sylwester Zwierzynski	159	21.0	−11.2
Conservative	Dave Manton	111	14.6	N/A
Liberal Democrats	Helen Oakton	54	7.1	−12.3
TUSC	Dean Eggleston	39	5.1	N/A
Majority		227	30.0	
Rejected ballots		5	0.66	
Turnout		763	22.08	+1.55
Registered electors		3,447		
Labour hold		Swing		
Labour hold		Swing		

=== South Normanton East ===
South Normanton East
Party	Candidate	Votes	%	±%
Labour	Emma Stevenson	371	41.1	−4.0
Labour	Lucy King	294	32.6	−11.0
Conservative	Andrew Brogdale	242	26.8	N/A
Conservative	Sharon Coleman	197	21.8	N/A
Independent	Tracey Cannon*	184	20.4	−30.2
Independent	Andrew Joesbury*	141	15.6	−33.0
Independent	John Cox	132	14.6	N/A
Independent	Aileen Coleman	126	14.0	N/A
Majority		52	5.8	
Rejected ballots		22	2.38	
Turnout		924	25.82	+0.25
Registered electors		3,576		
Labour gain from Independent		Swing		
Labour gain from Independent		Swing		

=== South Normanton West ===
South Normanton West
Party	Candidate	Votes	%	±%
Labour	Lisa Powell	438	35.3	−1.2
Labour	Phil Smith	422	34.0	−0.3
Conservative	Louise Fox	410	33.1	+12.2
Labour	Adam Summers	405	32.7	−2.4
Conservative	Christopher Key	381	30.7	+10.5
Conservative	Alfie Mountford	377	30.4	+15.2
Independent	Olivia Ball	238	19.2	N/A
Independent	Susan Burnham	213	17.2	N/A
Independent	David Coleman	143	11.5	N/A
Green	Ian Mason	113	9.1	N/A
Independent	Christine Papworth	106	8.5	N/A
Independent	Graham Parkin*	82	6.6	−33.3
Independent	Evonne Parkin*	79	6.4	−32.0
TUSC	Brian Loader	33	2.7	N/A
Majority		5	0.4	
Rejected ballots		17	1.35	
Turnout		1,257	23.78	−1.95
Registered electors		5,275		
Labour gain from Independent		Swing		
Labour gain from Independent		Swing		
Conservative gain from Independent		Swing		

=== Tibshelf ===
Tibshelf
Party	Candidate	Votes	%	±%
Independent	Justin Gilbody	420	42.1	N/A
Independent	Deborah Watson*	341	34.2	−7.1
Independent	Allison Beckett	326	32.7	N/A
Labour	Kathryn Salt	270	27.1	−5.8
Labour	Jane Molsher-Berry	188	18.9	−7.8
Independent	Raymond Heffer*	178	17.9	−15.6
Conservative	Josh Flint	85	8.5	N/A
Conservative	Shawn Sunderland	56	5.6	N/A
Majority		15	1.5	
Rejected ballots		13	1.29	
Turnout		1,010	30.69	−5.61
Registered electors		3,284		
Independent gain from Independent		Swing		
Independent hold		Swing		

=== Whitwell ===
Whitwell
Party	Candidate	Votes	%	±%
Labour	Tom Munro*	434	49.7	+8.1
Labour	Jeanne Raspin	377	43.1	+9.8
Independent	Peter Roberts*	320	36.6	−26.4
Conservative	Peter Jackson	215	24.6	+3.3
Conservative	Paul Bettison	150	17.2	N/A
Reform	Linda Roberts	117	13.4	N/A
Majority		57	6.5	
Rejected ballots		1	0.11	
Turnout		875	29.53	−1.58
Registered electors		2,962		
Labour gain from Independent		Swing		
Labour hold		Swing		

== Changes 2023–2027 ==
- Carol Wood, elected for Bolsover South as a Conservative and a former leader of the Conservative group, left the party to join Reform UK in September 2024.
- Stephen Fritchley, elected for Langwith as Labour, stepped down as Leader of the Council in January 2025 after a code of conduct investigation found that language he had used, in a dispute with the former Conservative MP for Bolsover, could have been perceived as homophobic, and subsequently left the party to sit as an independent.
- Between the 2023 election and mid-2025, seven further Labour councillors left the party to sit as independents: Chris Kane and Jen Wilson (Shirebrook North), Janet Tait (Shirebrook South), Emma Stevenson (South Normanton East), Rita Turner (Elmton-with-Creswell), Anne Clarke (Bolsover East) and Sandra Peake (Langwith), reducing Labour's representation on the council from 31 to 23 seats.
- Rowan Clarke, elected for Bolsover East as Labour, also subsequently left the party to sit as an independent.
- Louise Fox, elected for South Normanton West as a Conservative, subsequently left the party to join Reform UK.
