= Listed buildings in Pilsley, North East Derbyshire =

Pilsley is a civil parish in the North East Derbyshire district of Derbyshire, England. The parish contains three listed buildings that are recorded in the National Heritage List for England. All the listed buildings are designated at Grade II, the lowest of the three grades, which is applied to "buildings of national importance and special interest". The parish contains the village of Pilsley and the surrounding area, and the listed buildings consist of a farmhouse, a barn and a pair of cottages.

== Buildings ==
Name and location	Photograph	Date	Notes
Morton Road Farmhouse and outbuildings 53.15244°N 1.36935°W		17th century	The farmhouse, which has been altered, is in sandstone with quoins, and a slate roof with coped gables, moulded kneelers, and ball finials. It is in two and three storeys, and has a two-storey outshut, and a south front of six irregular bays. The doorway has a chamfered surround, and the windows vary, some with hood moulds.
Barn west of Morton Road Farmhouse; 53.15245°N 1.36973°W	—	17th century	The barn is in sandstone with a slate roof, and an interior of five bays. On the north side are three doorways, and the windows are irregularly placed. Inside the barn are two cruck trusses.
Sitwell Lane Cottages; 53.15502°N 1.36543°W	—	17th century	A pair of sandstone cottages with a tile roof, two storeys and four bays. Some windows have a single light, some are mullioned with two lights, and there is a blocked fire window with a moulded surround. Inside the east cottage is a cruck truss.
