= Tibshelf =

Village in Derbyshire, England

Coordinates: 53.143°N 1.345°W

- Village and civil parish
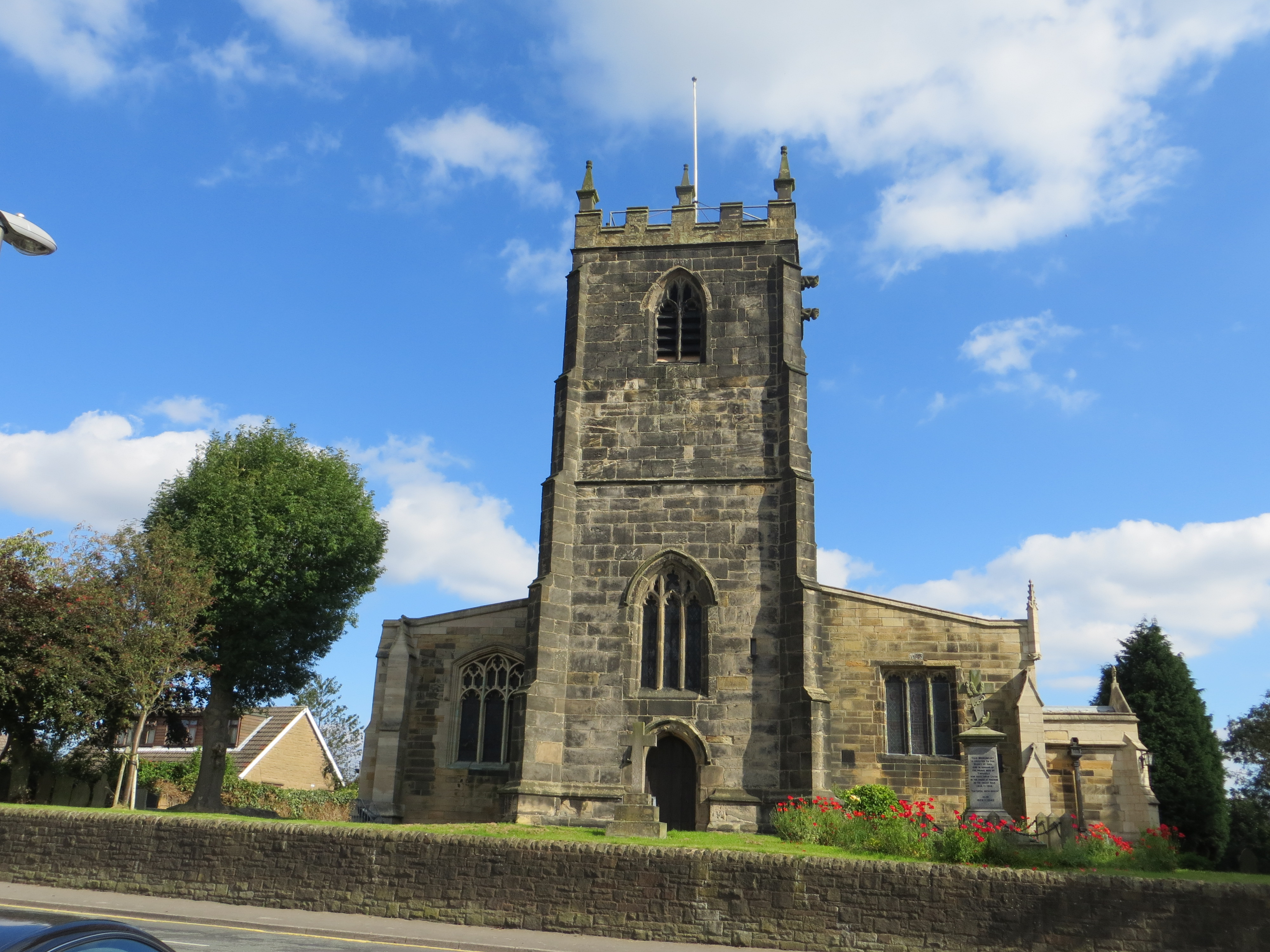
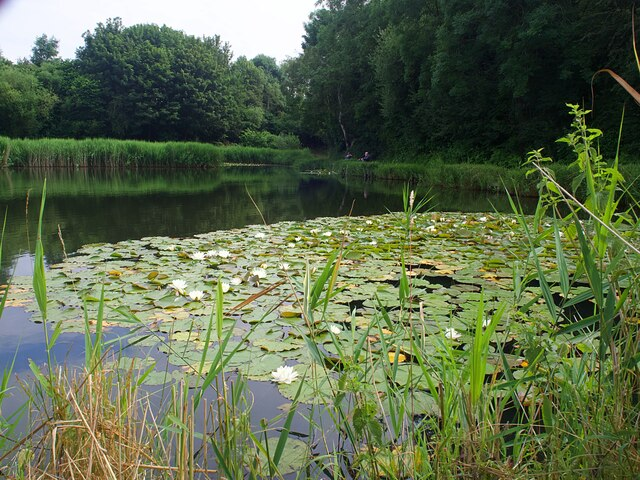
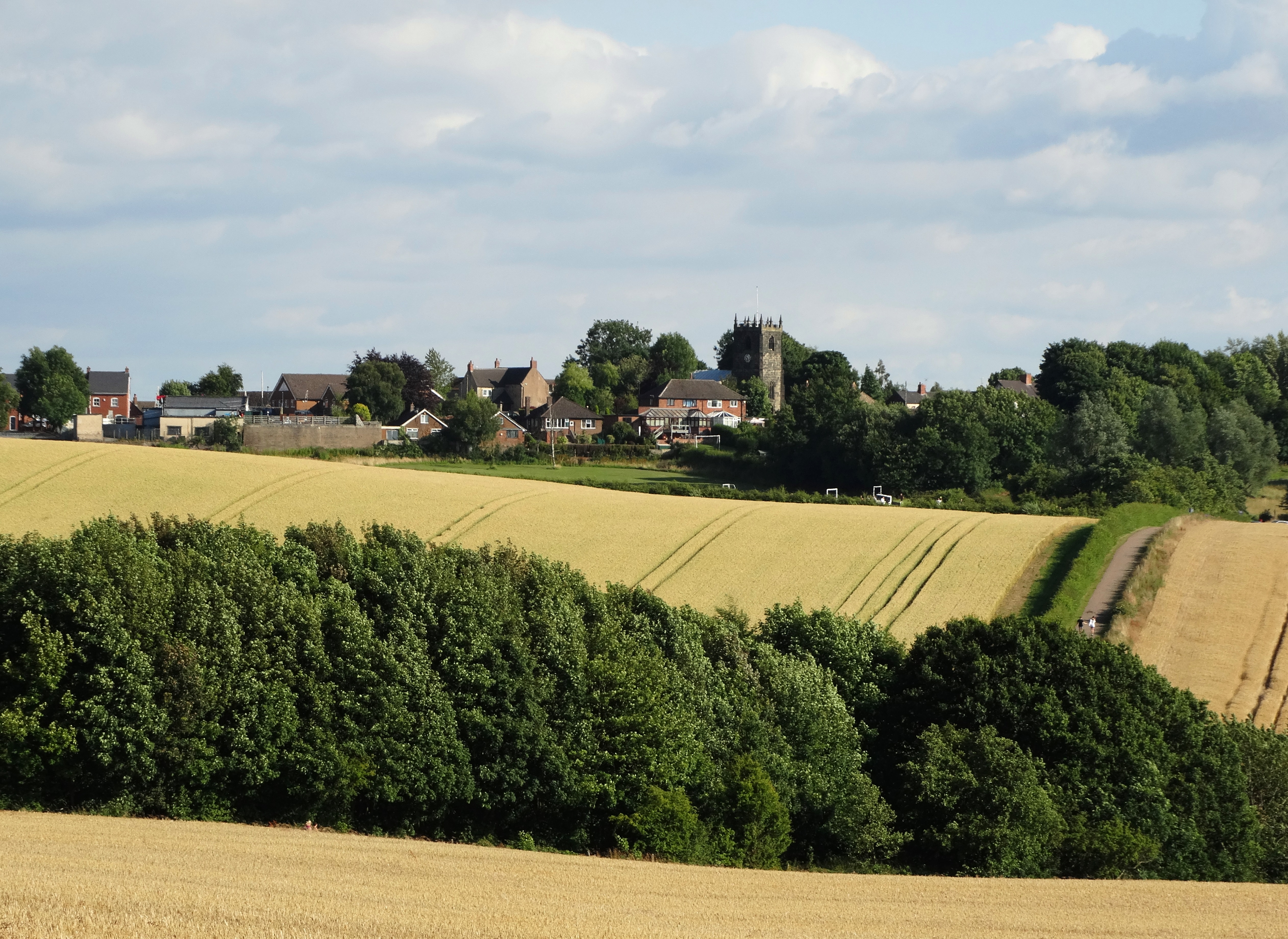
- St John the Baptist Church Tibshelf Ponds Tibshelf from afar

- Location within Derbyshire
- Population: 4,348 (2021)
- OS grid reference: SK439607
- District: Bolsover
- Shire county: Derbyshire
- Region: East Midlands
- Country: England
- Sovereign state: United Kingdom
- Post town: ALFRETON
- Postcode district: DE55
- Dialling code: 01773
- Police: Derbyshire
- Fire: Derbyshire
- Ambulance: East Midlands
- UK Parliament: Bolsover
- Website: https://tibshelfparishcouncil.gov.uk/

Tibshelf is a village and civil parish in the Bolsover District in Derbyshire, England. It lies between the towns of Clay Cross, Shirebrook, Mansfield and Chesterfield and had a population of 4,348 at the 2021 Census. Tibshelf shares its boundaries with the villages of Morton, Pilsley, Newton, Teversal and Hardstoft.

The village was the site of the UK's first inland oil well. In the 19th century, coal was discovered. Coal mining overtook agriculture as the primary industry in the area, and a local railway system was developed. Two deep mines were sunk, but were under threat of closure for a number of years after a partial cave-in. The settlement was recorded in Domesday in 1066.

== Culture and community ==
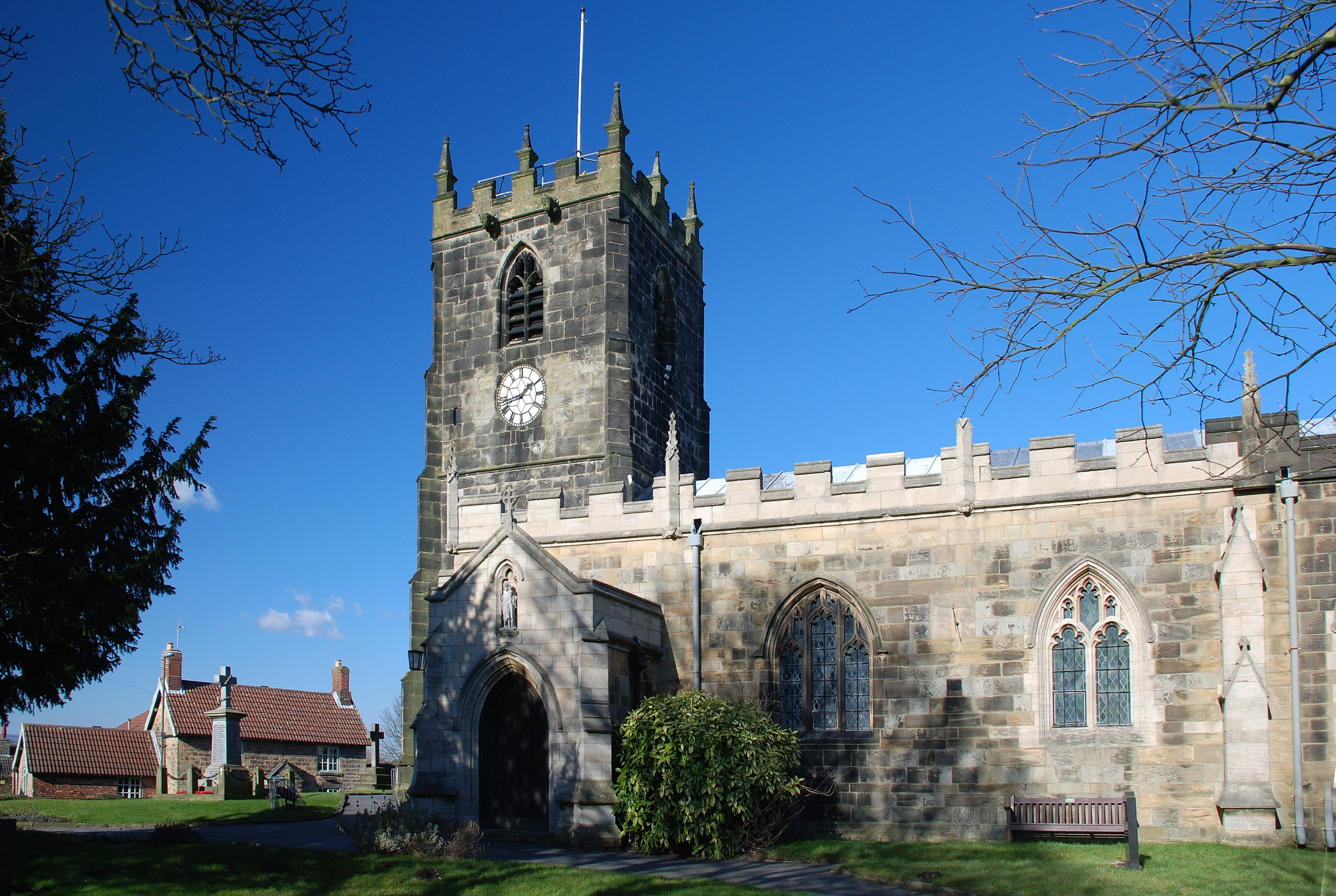
Tibshelf Church

Tibshelf has since redeveloped itself into a popular place to live, in part because of its location near the M1 motorway (Tibshelf services was originally named Chesterfield Services, but was rebranded as it was closer to Tibshelf, and after pressure from the local authorities) and its proximity to Nottingham, Sheffield, Derby, Chesterfield, Sutton-in-Ashfield and Mansfield. The route of the closed Great Central Railway line was redeveloped by Derbyshire County Council in the late 1960s and early 1970s, and now forms part of the Five Pits Trail network. These efforts received a Countryside Award in 1970, as indicated by a plaque at nearby Pilsley. The trail runs approximately 12 miles (19 km), from Tibshelf to Grassmoor Country Park, though with the filling in of cuttings and removal of embankments it is virtually unrecognisable as a former railway line.

There are three schools in Tibshelf: Tibshelf Infant and Nursery School, on High Street; Tibshelf Town-End Junior School, on Alfreton Road; and Tibshelf Community School (a secondary school), on Doe Hill Lane.

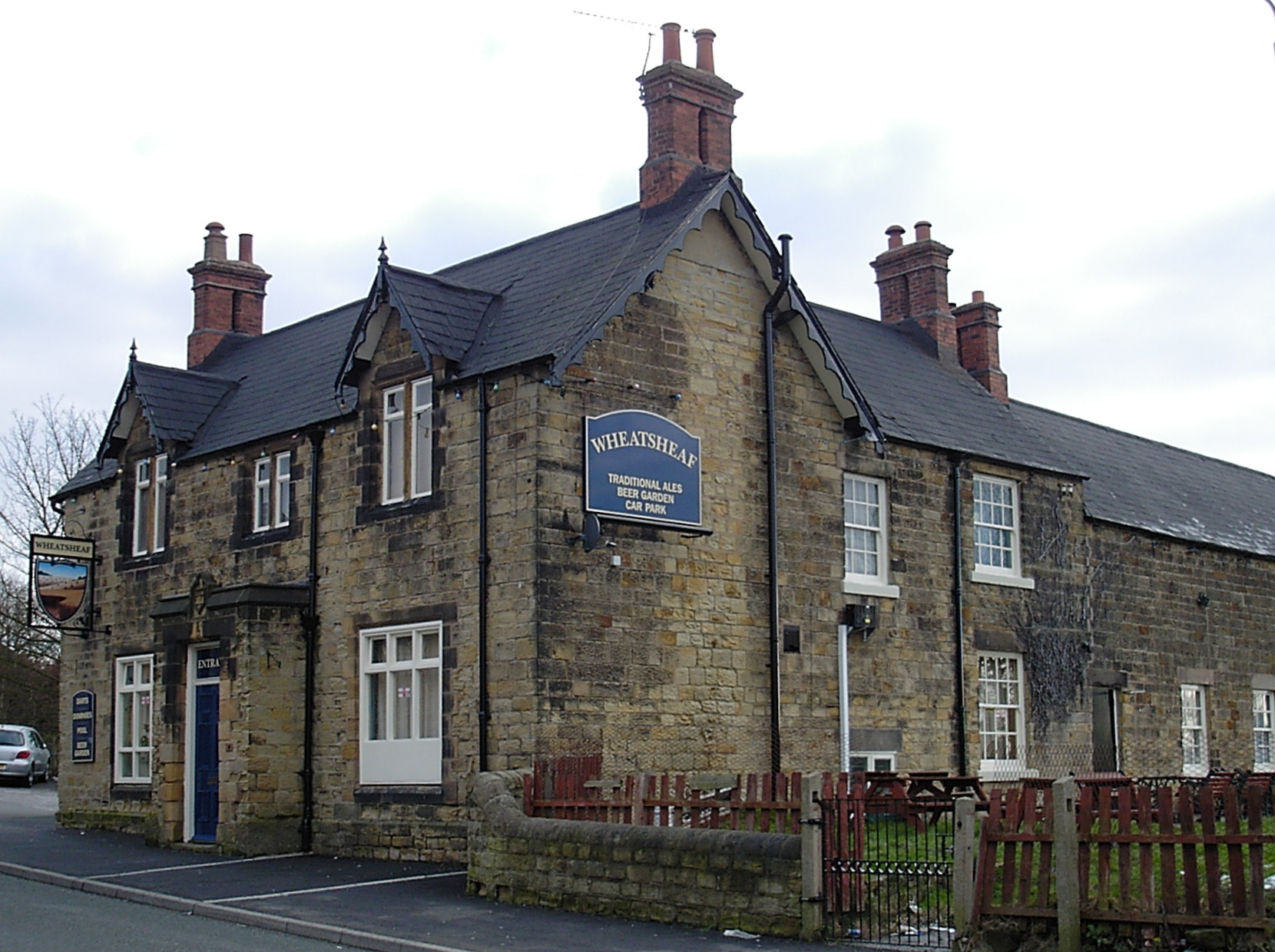
The Wheatsheaf

Tibshelf has a large cricket field and modern pavilion built there by the behest of Lindsay Tydeswell (now a teacher at Tibshelf Community School), adjacent to Shetland Road, towards the village's Southern boundary, with Newton.

Other leisure highlights include Tibshelf Ponds, which stand at an ex-colliery site and comprise two fishing ponds containing mixed coarse fish and carp. Angling is controlled by Tibshelf and Newton Angling Club. One pond is available to fish on a day ticket; the other is permit only.

The closed public house The Slap and Tickle was demolished in 2014 and construction began on a new building to relocate the Co-Operative store from further up High Street.

== Transport ==
Two railway stations once served Tibshelf. Tibshelf & Newton was on a branch line of the Midland Railway (later part of the LMS) from Westhouses & Blackwell on the Erewash Valley Line to Teversal, opened in 1863 and later extended to Mansfield Woodhouse. This line closed to passengers in 1930 but remained open for freight and coal trains for many years afterwards; the route is now a footpath and the main station building still stands.

Tibshelf Town was opened in 1893 by the Manchester, Sheffield & Lincolnshire Railway (later part of the Great Central Railway and subsequently the LNER), on its line to Annesley, later part of the Great Central Main Line to London, optimistically reflecting Tibshelf's aspirations to obtain official town status. Tibshelf never did become a town but the station kept this name throughout its operating life. It closed in 1963, the line itself in 1966. The collieries in Tibshelf had closed in the 1930s, although coal mining continued to be a major source of employment for the village, with a significant number of Tibshelf's inhabitants working at local pits in the early 1980s before the government-induced collapse of the coal industry in that decade.

There was a third station in the parish, situated on the Midland's Erewash Valley Line, serving the villages of Stonebroom and Morton but named Doe Hill after the small hamlet in which it is situated. This station closed in 1960.

A fourth station existed near the "Woodend" public house. Whilst it straddles the county boundary, the station building at platform level was in Tibshelf parish. The roadside booking hall was in Nottinghamshire.

== Notable residents ==
- Fred Thelonious Baker (born 1960), jazz bass guitarist, played in Phil Miller's Canterbury scene band In Cahoots
- Frank Lee (1867-1941), politician and MP for North East Derbyshire, 1922/1931 & 1935/1941

=== Sport ===
- William Egan (1872–1946), Wales soccer international, died locally after working as a miner
- Tom Hulatt (1930–1990), runner in the race when the 4-minute mile record was broken by Christopher Chataway; finished third
- Joshua Johnson (born 1884, date of death unknown), football goalkeeper who played 276 games for Crystal Palace
- Alf Pope (1909–1996), cricketer who played 214 first-class cricket games for Derbyshire
- George Pope (1911–1993), cricketer, who played 205 first-class cricket games for Derbyshire and one Test cricket match
- Lew Wyld (1905–1974), track cyclist who a team bronze medal at the 1928 Summer Olympics

== See also ==
- Listed buildings in Tibshelf
