= Hilcote =

Village in Derbyshire, England

Coordinates: 53.1180°N 1.3246°W

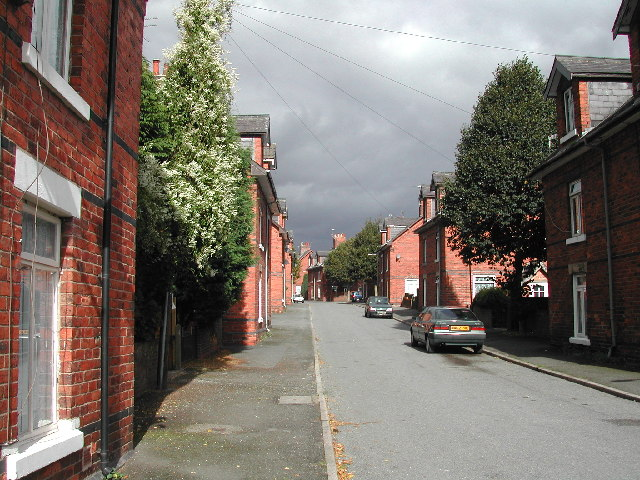
- New Street in 2005

- Location within Derbyshire
- Population: 350 (2001)
- OS grid reference: SK467592
- District: Bolsover
- Shire county: Derbyshire
- Region: East Midlands
- Country: England
- Sovereign state: United Kingdom
- Post town: Alfreton
- Postcode district: DE55
- Dialling code: 01773
- Police: Derbyshire
- Fire: Derbyshire
- Ambulance: East Midlands
- UK Parliament: Bolsover

Hilcote is a small village in the south of the Bolsover district in Derbyshire, England, located close to the A38 junction with the M1 (Junction 28).

The village is surrounded by the villages of South Normanton, Blackwell, Old Blackwell and Huthwaite in Nottinghamshire. The nearest towns are Alfreton to the west and Sutton-in-Ashfield(where the population is included) to the east.

The village is a former mining village and was previously called 'B' Winning. 'B' Winning pit was named after the seam of coal being mined from Blackwell Colliery. The village exists because of the pit, which was first sunk in the last part of the 19th century and was worked until 1964. When 'B' Winning pit closed the land was reclaimed and classed as Grade 4 agricultural land.

There are about 200 houses in the village with approximately 350 residents. The Post Office, which also served as a general store, off-licence and video library closed in 2019. Many of the houses in the village were built for the mineworkers by Blackwell Colliery Company and are considered to be unique examples of this type of architecture and size of house for miners. Other houses in the village date back to the 17th and 18th centuries. When the pit was working there were a number of shops, which have since disappeared.

The village has three pubs, The Hilcote Country Club, Hilcote Miners Welfare and Hilcote Arms. The Miner's Welfare was burnt down, demolished and rebuilt during the 1990s. Hilcote chapel closed too.

A number of residents are the third generation of their families in Hilcote. Many people were born on what was called Top Row and Side Row at 'B' Winning.
