= Westhouses =

Village in Derbyshire, England

Coordinates: 53.117°N 1.369°W

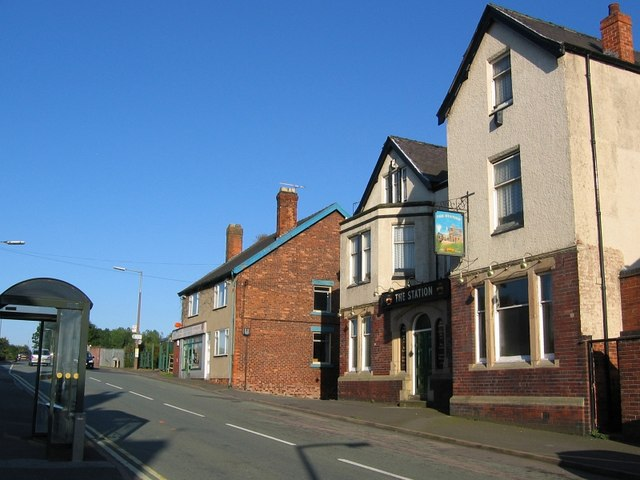
- The Station public house and the Post Office in 2006

- Location within Derbyshire
- OS grid reference: SK423579
- District: Bolsover
- Shire county: Derbyshire
- Region: East Midlands
- Country: England
- Sovereign state: United Kingdom
- Post town: ALFRETON
- Postcode district: DE55 5
- Dialling code: 01773
- Police: Derbyshire
- Fire: Derbyshire
- Ambulance: East Midlands

Westhouses is a village within Derbyshire, situated close to the town of Alfreton. It is in the Bolsover district of the county. It is in the civil parish of Blackwell. Named after West House Farm, the settlement was founded in the 1870s.

== Railway ==
The Midland Railway (later the London, Midland and Scottish Railway) was the main employer and landowner. Many roads such as Allport Terrace, Bolden Terrace and Pettifer Terrace were named after Midland Railway directors, and the school was also built and maintained by the company.

Most of the houses were two up and two down, with an outside toilet in the back yard, although the engine drivers' houses were bigger. They did not have mains electricity until the early 1957 and were owned by the Midland Railway, later by the British Railways Board until about 1969. There should have been 100 houses by the school but only 75 were built, stopping at 2, Bolden Terrace, apparently making it a semi-detached house by accident. However, there were only ever two, built for the two shed foremen. A history of Westhouses was written by Gordon Henry Warwick in about 1962.

The mainline railway through Westhouses is the Erewash Valley line from Nottingham to Chesterfield.

A station existed very early in the lines development but was soon closed. The second station became known as Westhouses & Blackwell.

Branchlines ran to New Hucknall colliery and New Hucknall Sidings on the Great Central Railway.

A through line ran to Tibshelf, Sutton Colliery, Silverhill, Butcherwood and Pleasley Colliery, finally connecting with the Robin Hood line at Mansfield Woodhouse.

Built by the Midland Railway the engine shed included arrival and departure roads, an ash road, six internal roads and the legs road, which once had a shear legged crane positioned over it. This was used for the lifting of locomotives. The shed was intended to be a maintenance centre for the LMS but water supply problems prevented its expansion. Railwaymen's children would often be given a turn driving the locos during the 1930s, and in the diesel era rail enthusiasts would also be allowed to drive locomotives up and down the yard.

Besides working on the railway in the various grades, many local residents found employment at Blackwell Colliery, but there was little other employment and many were out of work in the 1930s depression. A chapel of ease (the tin tabernacle) was built near the School and Recreation ground, and stood until its removal to the Midland Railway - Butterley near Ripley. The organ was played by a lady who reputedly only knew two hymns, one of which was "The day thou gavest" and the other was "To be a pilgrim."

After the 1926 General Strike many villagers boycotted the Trent Bus Company as it had continued running buses during the emergency, and instead they patronised the local village service, which had gone out in sympathy.

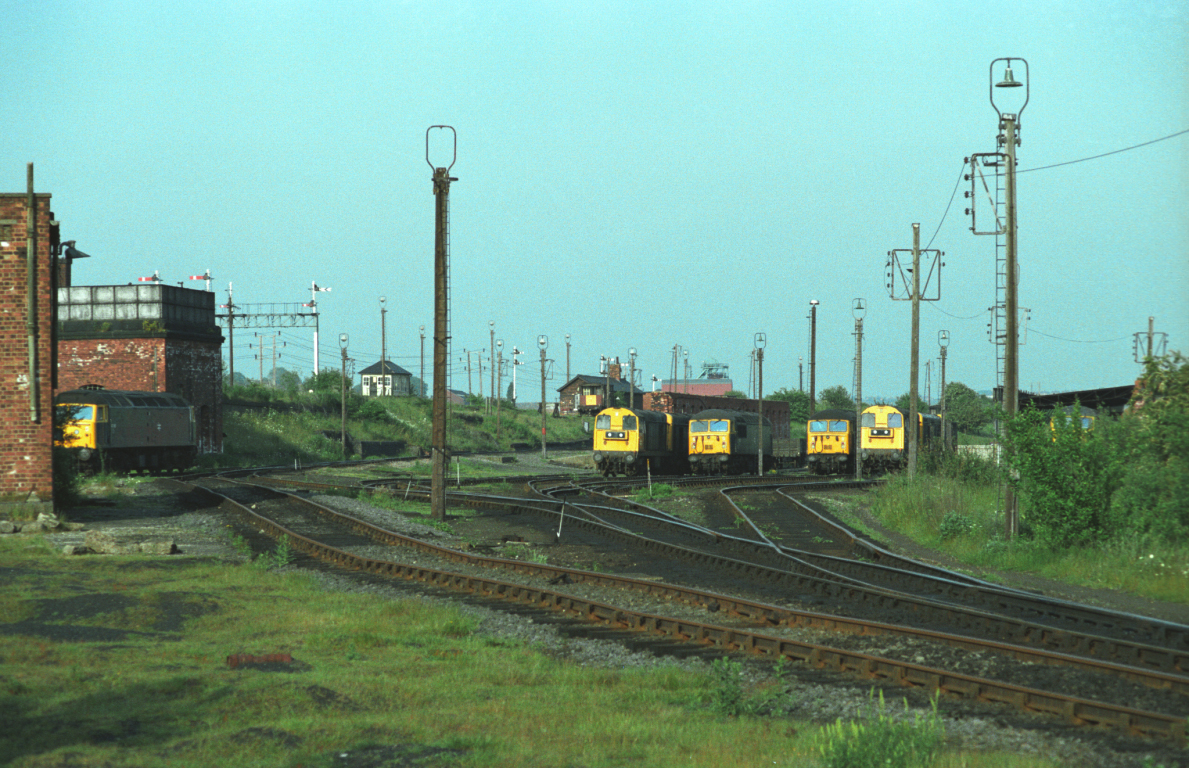
Westhouses Motive Power Depot in 1983

In the 1950s and 60's Jinty's 4F's, 8F's and 9F's were most common. In steam days Garratts could be seen pounding up the gradient in front of a long line of coal wagons. When diesels were introduced, classes, 08, 25, 47 and 45 were seen. Into the 1970s British Rail Classes 08, 20, 47 and latterly 56 were the main stay. Classes 25, 45, and 58 also visited the shed.

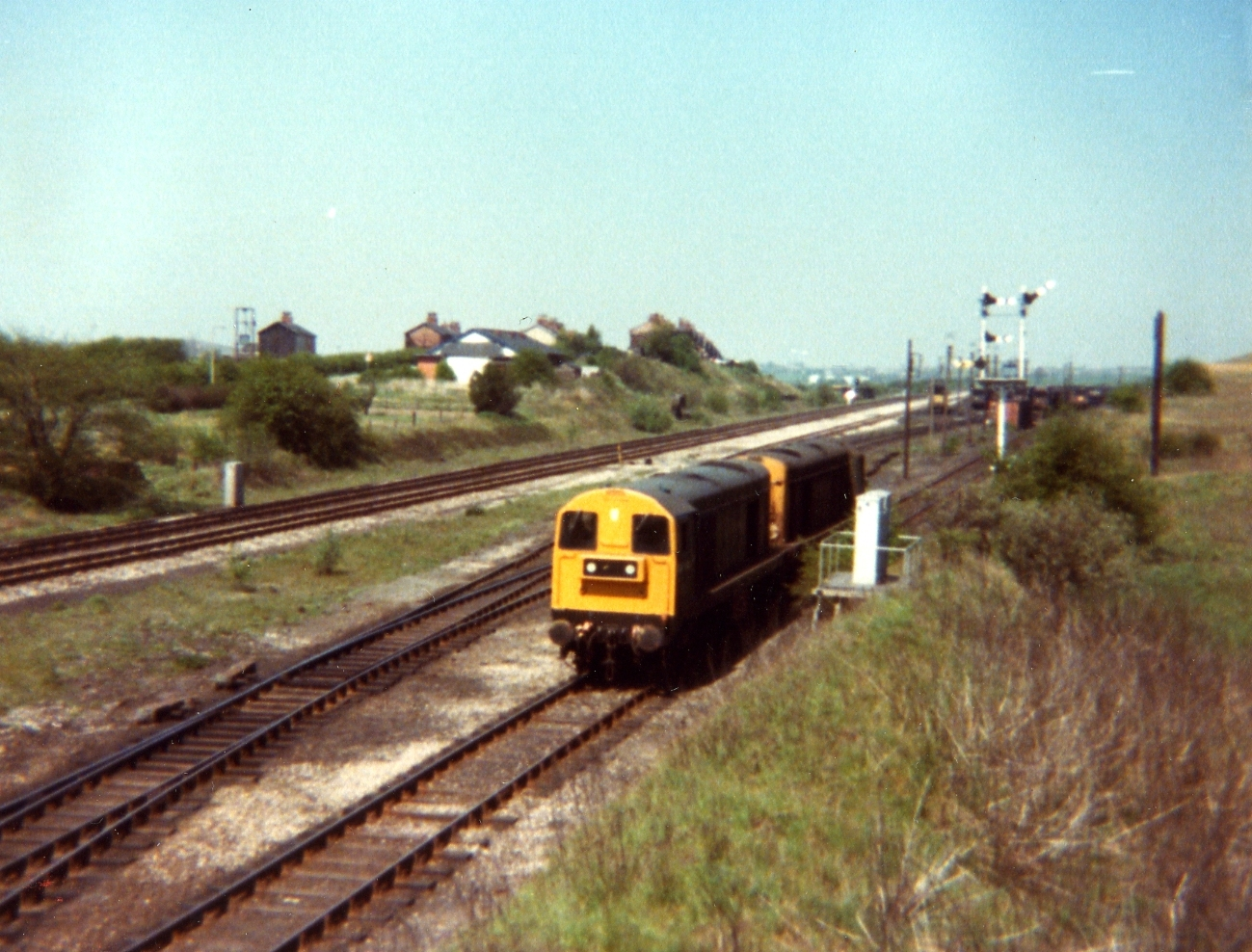
Westhouses - Tibshelf Sidings in 1980

The shed closed to locomotives when traffic defects caused a Class 56 to derail and the shed was deemed to be no longer in a usable condition. Operations were moved to Tibshelf sidings until the complete closure of Westhouses as a traincrew depot in January 1987.

The last locally employed railway positions were the travelling shunters based in the flat-topped cabin at the start of Tibshelf Sidings, these positions were however made redundant when Silverhill colliery closed.

== See also ==
- List of places in Derbyshire
