= Blackwell, Bolsover =

Village in Derbyshire, England

Coordinates: 53.12°N 1.354°W

Blackwell
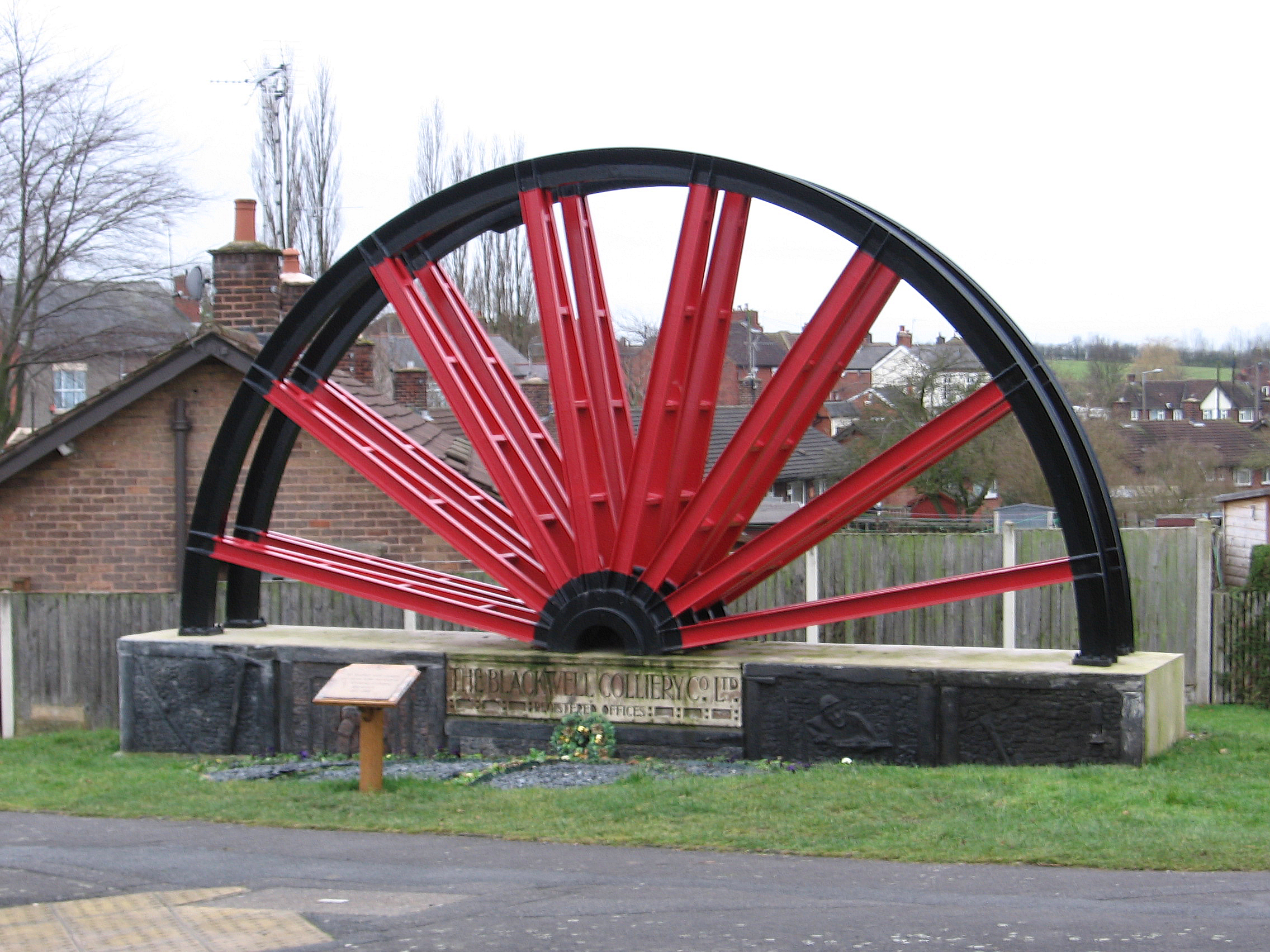
- "A" Winning Mining Monument

- Coat of arms
- Population: 4,389 (Including Newton and Westhouses 2011)
- OS grid reference: SK433582
- District: Bolsover
- Shire county: Derbyshire
- Region: East Midlands
- Country: England
- Sovereign state: United Kingdom
- Post town: ALFRETON
- Postcode district: DE55
- Police: Derbyshire
- Fire: Derbyshire
- Ambulance: East Midlands

Blackwell is a village in Derbyshire, England. The population of the civil parish at the 2011 census was 4,389. It is one of the four villages that make up the civil parish of Blackwell within the District of Bolsover - the other villages being Hilcote, Newton and Westhouses. The Parish Council meets monthly. A brief history of the Parish of Blackwell was published in 1994 (the centenary year of the formation of Blackwell Parish Council).

It is 3 1/2 miles (5.5 kilometres) northeast of Alfreton.

William Foulke the Sheffield United, Chelsea, Bradford City and England goalkeeper lived in Blackwell before moving to Sheffield to sign for Sheffield United.

Another native of Blackwell was Percy Toplis – The Monocled Mutineer – who went on to become a mutineer and conman during and after World War I. Toplis, while wanted for murdering a taxi driver, was eventually shot and killed by police officers on the Scottish Borders. A television series based on the life of the Monocled Mutineer was written by Alan Bleasdale in 1986 and broadcast on the BBC.

In 1910 the highest ever ninth-wicket partnership in first-class cricket was scored by John Chapman and Arnold Warren batting for Derbyshire against Warwickshire. Still unsurpassed over a hundred years later, the record stand of 283 was made in three hours. At that time Blackwell Miners Welfare possessed a first-class playing surface and was one of the grounds sometimes used by Derbyshire CCC for County Championship fixtures. The ground still exists today, and is little changed from how it was in 1910, but it is now only used for cricket at a local level, and also for football.

The main industry of Blackwell was coal mining. On 11 November 1895, seven men were killed in an underground explosion at the colliery. The mine was closed in 1969 since when light industry has taken over.

Blackwell has one church: St Werburgh's Parish Church .

Blackwell forms part of the Bolsover parliamentary constituency; the MP is Mark Fletcher (Conservative).

== Notable people ==
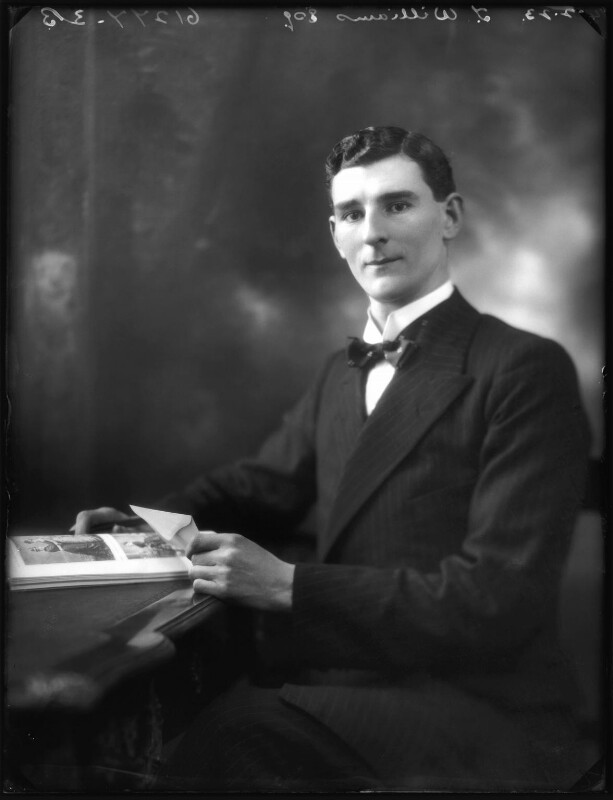
Tom Williams, Baron Williams of Barnburgh, 1923

- Abraham Booth (1734–1806), a dissenting minister and author, known as a Baptist apologetical writer.
- Tom Williams, Baron Williams of Barnburgh (1888–1967), a coal miner, politician and MP for Don Valley from 1922 to 1959

=== Sport ===
- James Birch (1888–1940), footballer who played 334 games with Queens Park Rangers.
- Jim Simmons (1889–1972), footballer who played 204 games for Sheffield United
- Harold Hill (1899–1969), footballer who played 275 games including 151 for Notts County
- Elijah Carrington (1914–1998), cricketer who played 50 First-class cricket matches for Derbyshire
- Allenby Driver (1918–1997), footballer who played over 200 games
- Terry Adlington (1935–1994), football goalkeeper who played about 230 games, mainly for Torquay United

== See also ==
- Listed buildings in Blackwell, Bolsover
