= Pilsley, North East Derbyshire =

Village in Derbyshire, England

Coordinates: 53.155°N 1.366°W

Pilsley
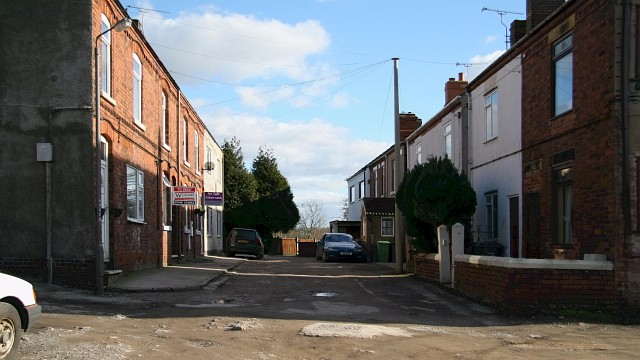
- New Street, Pilsley

- Location within Derbyshire
- Population: 3,487 (2011)
- OS grid reference: SK424621
- District: North East Derbyshire
- Shire county: Derbyshire
- Region: East Midlands
- Country: England
- Sovereign state: United Kingdom
- Post town: CHESTERFIELD
- Postcode district: S45
- Police: Derbyshire
- Fire: Derbyshire
- Ambulance: East Midlands

Pilsley is a village and civil parish in the district of North East Derbyshire in the county of Derbyshire, England, near the town of Chesterfield. At the 2011 Census the population was 3,487.

Pilsley has an Anglican church, St Mary's, an evangelical Methodist church, two primary schools, a post office and a Kingdom Hall building for Jehovah's Witnesses. Pilsley also has a Village Hall and St Mary's Centre (formerly the church hall). Recently a new sports centre (The Elm Centre) was built for the school which is also available for community use. A section of the Midland Main Line (Nottingham to Chesterfield section) runs along the western edge of the village. A branch of the Great Central Railway ran through the village before the Beeching cuts of the 1960s; Pilsley railway station was on Station Road. The route of this former railway line now serves as a popular walking, cycling and horse riding trail known as the Five Pits Trail, linking Pilsley to Tibshelf, Holmewood, Grassmoor and beyond.

Pilsley has a Sunday league football team called Pilsley Miners Welfare Football Club. The team is currently part of the Chesterfield and District Sunday League.

The source of the River Rother is at Pilsley.

== History ==
Pilsley is mentioned in the Domesday Book as one of the manors belonging to Walter D'Aincourt.

Before 1800, Pilsley was an agricultural settlement consisting of Upper Pilsley and Nether Pilsley. Few of the houses from that period still exist: there are some on the corner of Station Road and Sitwell Grange Lane near the Primary School and others around Barlow Bank, Barlow Bank Farm and Grange Farm in Upper Pilsley near the site of the village well. These houses are made from locally quarried coal-measure sandstone which is soft and contains a high percentage of iron. This quarry no longer exists, but was north of Upper Pilsley.

Pilsley Colliery was founded in 1866 on the site of the present day Locko Plantation. At its peak the colliery comprised six shafts, employed 945 men and produced 1,200 tons of coal per shift. The colliery was closed in 1957.

Pilsley consists of two distinct residential areas known as Lower Pilsley and Pilsley (sometimes Upper Pilsley), Lower Pilsley to the north and Pilsley to the south. There is some local disagreement as to whether these two areas constitute two separate villages or one larger village. At the start of the village's life, people referred to the area around what is now Pilsley primary as Nether Pilsley. Both areas of the village are united by the same parish council, Pilsley Parish Council, which was formed on 30 January 1874, Pilsley having previously been part of the parish of North Wingfield. Maps show that the village is made up of four separate residential areas, which are, in order from north to south, Lower Pilsley, Upper Pilsley, Pilsley and Nether Pilsley.

== Notable people ==
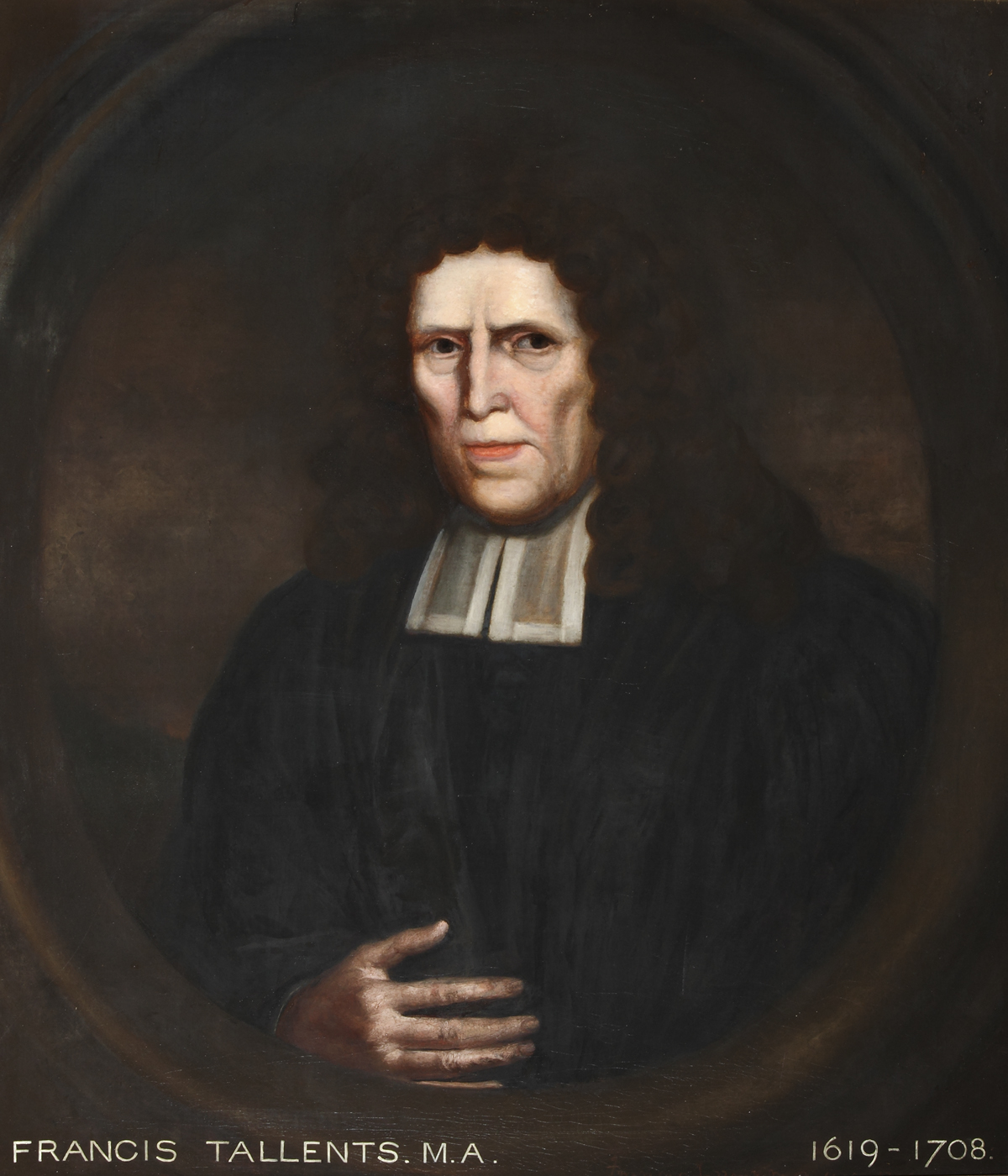
19th C. painting of Francis Tallents

- Francis Tallents (1619–1708), a non-conforming English Presbyterian clergyman.
- Emmanuel Cooper (1938–2012), a studio potter and writer on arts and crafts; his work can be found in the Victoria & Albert Museum

=== Sport ===
- George Gregory (1878–1958), cricketer who played 15 first-class cricket matches for Derbyshire
- Thomas Hallam (1881–1958), cricketer who played 10 first-class cricket matches for Derbyshire
- Archibald Slater (1890–1949), cricketer who played 211 first-class cricket matches for Derbyshire
- Jack Bradford (1895–1969), footballer who played 185 games
- Albert Worthy (1905–1978), footballer who played 332 games including 198 for Lincoln City
- Sam Weaver (1909–1985), footballer who played over 370 games including 204 for Newcastle United, plus 3 for England

== See also ==
- Listed buildings in Pilsley, North East Derbyshire
