= Five Pits Trail =

Rail trail in Derbyshire, England

Coordinates: 53.200204°N 1.384782°W

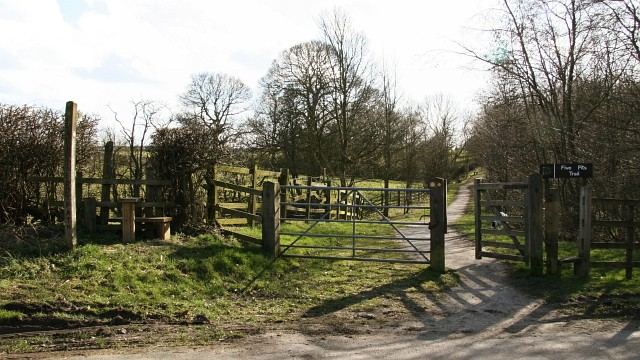
Five Pits Trail

The Five Pits Trail is a rail trail in Derbyshire, England. It consists of a network of surfaced walkways for recreational use. The approximately 5.5-mile-long (8.9 km) trail links Grassmoor to Tibshelf. The Trail can be extended to 7.5 miles (12.1 km) by continuing along the route to Williamthorpe Ponds and Holmewood. Derbyshire County Council created the Five Pits Trail in 1989, following the route of the former Great Central Railway which served the five main coal mines of Grassmoor, Williamthorpe, Holmewood, Pilsley and Tibshelf.

Part of the trail (between Station Road, Pilsley, and Tibshelf) has been identified as the "Tom Hulatt Mile" and is marked at the side of the trail. This mile commemorates local runner Tom Hulatt who took place in the race that created the first four-minute mile and who finished third behind Chris Chataway.

The Tibshelf end of the trail runs past Newton Ponds and joins the Teversal, Skegby and Silverhill Trails, which connects to the Brierley Forest Link Trail, in Ashfield District, Nottinghamshire.

Access to the Five Pits Trail is possible via numerous footpaths which cross it and by a number of roads which cross it. There are car parks provided at several locations: Church Lane in Tibshelf, Station Road in Pilsley, Timber Lane near Astwith, and at both the Birkin Lane and the Mansfield Road entrances to Grassmoor Country Park.
