= Bolsover District =

Coordinates: 53.25°N 1.26°W

- Non-metropolitan district
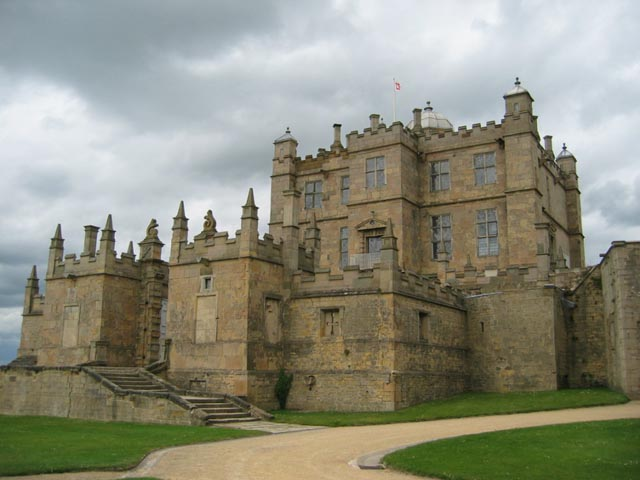
- Bolsover Castle

- Shown within Derbyshire
- Sovereign state: United Kingdom
- Constituent country: England
- Region: East Midlands
- Ceremonial county: Derbyshire
- Admin. HQ: Clowne

Government
  - Type: Bolsover District Council
  - Leadership: Leader & Cabinet
  - Executive: Labour
  - MPs: Natalie Fleet (L)

Area
  - Total: 62 sq mi (160 km^{2})
  - Rank: 162nd

Population (2024)
  - Total: 83,773
  - Rank: Ranked 277th
  - Density: 1,400/sq mi (520/km^{2})

Ethnicity (2021)
  - Ethnic groups: List: 97.4% White; 0.9% Asian; 0.9% Mixed; 0.5% Black; 0.3% other

Religion (2021)
  - Religion: List: 51% Christianity; 47.6% no religion; 1.1% other; 0.3% Islam
- Time zone: UTC+0 (Greenwich Mean Time)
  - Summer (DST): UTC+1 (British Summer Time)
- Postcode: DE, NG, S
- ONS code: 17UC (ONS); E07000033 (GSS)

Bolsover District is a local government district in Derbyshire, England. It is named after the town of Bolsover, which is near the geographic centre of the district, but the council is based in the large village of Clowne to the north. The district also includes the town of Shirebrook and several villages and surrounding rural areas.

The neighbouring districts are Amber Valley, North East Derbyshire, Chesterfield, Rotherham, Bassetlaw, Mansfield, and Ashfield.

== History ==
The district was formed on 1 April 1974 under the Local Government Act 1972, covering the area of three former districts, which were all abolished at the same time:

- Bolsover Urban District
- Blackwell Rural District
- Clowne Rural District

The new district was named Bolsover, after its largest town.

Under current local government restructuring plans it is planned that the district will be abolished in 2028, with its area forming part of a new Derbyshire North unitary authority.

== Governance ==
Bolsover District Council

Type
- Type: Non-metropolitan district

Leadership
- Chair: Duncan Haywood, Labour since 5 March 2025
- Leader: Jane Yates, Labour since 29 January 2025
- Chief Executive: Karen Hanson since November 2022

Structure
- Seats: 37 councillors
- Graph of the party split among 36 seats.
- Political groups: Administration (22) Labour (22) Other parties (14) Conservative (1) Reform (1) Independent (12)

Elections
- Last election: 4 May 2023

Meeting place
- The Arc, High Street, Clowne, S43 4JY

Website
- www.bolsover.gov.uk

Bolsover District Council provides district-level services. County-level services are provided by Derbyshire County Council. The district is also entirely covered by civil parishes, which form a third tier of local government.

Since 2014 the district has been a non-constituent member of the South Yorkshire Mayoral Combined Authority (formerly known as the Sheffield City Region); the council sends representatives to meetings of the combined authority, but the electorate of Bolsover District do not vote in elections for the Mayor of South Yorkshire.

=== Political control ===
The council has been under Labour majority control since 2021.

The first election to the council was held in 1973, initially operating as a shadow authority alongside the outgoing authorities until the new arrangements came into effect on 1 April 1974. Political control of the council since 1974 has been as follows:

Party in control	Years
Labour	1974–2019
No overall control	2019–2021
Labour	2021–present

=== Leadership ===
The leaders of the council since 1976 have been:

Councillor	Party	From	To
Harold Scrimshaw	Labour	1976	1988
Charles Limb	Labour	1988	May 1990
Harold Scrimshaw	Labour	May 1990	May 2003
Eion Watts	Labour	2003	May 2015
Ann Syrett	Labour	21 May 2015	May 2019
Steve Fritchley	Labour	22 May 2019	29 Jan 2025
Jane Yates	Labour	29 Jan 2025	

=== Composition ===
Following the 2023 election, and subsequent changes of allegiance up to September 2026, the composition of the council was:

Party	Seats
Labour	22
Conservative	1
Reform	1
Independent	12
Total	36

Eleven of the independent councillors sit together as the "Independent Group". The next election is due in 2027.

=== Elections ===
Since the last boundary changes in 2019, the council has comprised 37 councillors, elected from 17 wards, with each ward electing one, two or three councillors. Elections are held every four years.

=== Premises ===
The council is based at The Arc in Clowne, which is a combined leisure centre and council headquarters. The building was purpose-built for the council and opened in 2013. When first created the council used the former Blackwell Rural District Council's offices in Mansfield (outside the district) as its main offices. In 1994 it moved to Sherwood Lodge on Oxcroft Lane in Bolsover, comprising a large Victorian house and modern office extensions. After the move to Clowne in 2013 Sherwood Lodge was sold. A retail development has since been built on the site.

== Media ==
In terms of television, the district receives better TV signals from the Emley Moor transmitter which broadcast BBC Yorkshire and ITV Yorkshire. However, southern parts of the district can still receive TV signals from the Waltham transmitter which broadcast BBC East Midlands and ITV Central.

Radio stations for the area are:

- BBC Radio Derby
- BBC Radio Sheffield (covering Bolsover)
- Greatest Hits Radio North Derbyshire
- Capital East Midlands
- Hits Radio South Yorkshire
- Mansfield Radio
- Elastic Radio

The Derbyshire Times is the weekly local newspaper that serves the district.

== Building developments ==
Following the September 2022 commercial failure of Woodhead Construction Ltd, an Edwinstowe-based business contracting to the council since 2016, and mid-way into delivering a Bolsover Homes scheme, Bolsover District Council created their own development business, Dragonfly Development Limited based at The Arc in Clowne, with the intention of fulfilling ongoing contracts and having potential to undertake entirely new construction and development works outside of the council's normal remit.

Councillor Fritchley stated the only risks involved were "calculated risks".

== Parishes ==
Map of Bolsover district.

The district is divided into 16 civil parishes. The parish councils for Old Bolsover (which covers the town of Bolsover) and Shirebrook take the style "town council".

- Ault Hucknall
- Barlborough
- Blackwell (includes Hilcote, Newton and Westhouses)
- Clowne
- Elmton with Creswell
- Glapwell
- Hodthorpe and Belph
- Langwith
- Old Bolsover (town)
- Pinxton
- Pleasley
- Scarcliffe
- Shirebrook (town)
- South Normanton
- Tibshelf
- Whitwell
