= Bentinck (disambiguation) =

Bentinck may refer to:

People:

- Lord William Bentinck (1774-1839), Governor-General of India from 1828 to 1839
- Bentinck family, a prominent family in both Dutch and British nobility, including a list of British family members
- Bernhard Bentinck (1877-1931), English cricketer

Places:

- County of Bentinck, Queensland, Australia
- Bentinck, Ontario, Canada, a former township
- Bentinck, Derbyshire, England, a village
- Bentinck Township, Bottineau County, North Dakota, United States
- Bentinck Island, Queensland, Australia, part of the South Wellesley Islands
- Bentinck Island, British Columbia, Canada
- Bentinck Kyun (Bentinck Island), Burma

Ships:

- HMS Bentinck, three Royal Navy ships
- USS Bentinck (BDE-13), a World War II destroyer escort renamed and commissioned as USS Brennan

Other uses:

- Bengough Memorial Stakes, a Group 3 flat horse race originally called the Bentinck Stakes
- Bentinck Hotel, setting for the British TV series The Duchess of Duke Street

== See also ==
- North Bentinck Arm, British Columbia, Canada, an inlet
