= Grade II* listed buildings in Bolsover (district) =

There are over 20,000 Grade II* listed buildings in England. This page is a list of these buildings in the district of Bolsover in Derbyshire.

Name	Location	Type	Completed (Note: The date given is the date used by Historic England as significant for the initial building or that of an important part in the structure's description.)	Date designated	Grid ref. (Note: Sometimes known as OSGB36, the grid reference is based on the British national grid reference system used by the Ordnance Survey.) Geo-coordinates	Entry number (Note: The "List Entry Number" is a unique number assigned to each listed building and scheduled monument by Historic England.)	Image
Range of outbuildings and stables, and walls enclosing a courtyard to south of Hardwick Hall	Hardwick Park, Ault Hucknall	Stables	17th century	8 July 1966	SK4636263478; 53°09′59″N 1°18′29″W	1051634	Range of outbuildings and stables, and walls enclosing a courtyard to south of Hardwick Hall More images
Barlborough Old Hall	Barlborough	Manor house	17th century	26 August 1965	SK4764577296; 53°17′26″N 1°17′12″W	1335416	Barlborough Old Hall
Beightonfields Priory	Barlborough	Country house	17th century	26 August 1965	SK4559276749; 53°17′09″N 1°19′03″W	1052227	Beightonfields Priory More images
Church of St James	Barlborough	Church	12th century	26 August 1965	SK4769677188; 53°17′22″N 1°17′09″W	1335412	Church of St James More images
Gazebo at Barlborough Hall	Barlborough	Gazebo	17th century	23 March 1989	SK4765278265; 53°17′57″N 1°17′11″W	1367143	Gazebo at Barlborough Hall
Village Cross	Barlborough	Cross	14th century	26 August 1965	SK4761677277; 53°17′25″N 1°17′14″W	1039862	Village Cross More images
Newton Old Hall	Blackwell	House	Mid 17th century	11 July 1951	SK4438459217; 53°07′42″N 1°20′17″W	1367111	Newton Old Hall
Church of St John the Baptist	Clowne	Church	12th century	26 August 1965	SK4982875294; 53°16′20″N 1°15′15″W	1040039	Church of St John the Baptist More images
Clowne Cross	Clowne	Market cross	14th century	26 August 1965	SK4914875437; 53°16′25″N 1°15′52″W	1108957	Clowne Cross More images
Church of St Peter	Elmton	Church	20th century	26 August 1965	SK5026573452; 53°15′21″N 1°14′53″W	1335410	Church of St Peter More images
Church of the Holy Cross	Langwith	Church	13th century	8 July 1966	SK5187869331; 53°13′07″N 1°13′28″W	1335434	Church of the Holy Cross More images
Church of St Mary and St Laurence	Old Bolsover	Church	13th century	5 July 1965	SK4744270306; 53°13′40″N 1°17′27″W	1054045	Church of St Mary and St Laurence More images
Conduit house	Old Bolsover	Conduit house	17th century	5 July 1965	SK4755969987; 53°13′29″N 1°17′21″W	1108954	Upload Photo
Conduit house	Old Bolsover	Conduit house	17th century	5 July 1965	SK4716270440; 53°13′44″N 1°17′42″W	1054750	Conduit house
Conduit house to rear of Number 85	Old Bolsover	Conduit house	17th century	5 July 1965	SK4745670116; 53°13′34″N 1°17′26″W	1372046	Upload Photo
Conduit house to south-east of St Bernadette's Church	Old Bolsover	Conduit House	17th century	5 July 1965	SK4733970250; 53°13′38″N 1°17′32″W	1108981	Conduit house to south-east of St Bernadette's Church More images
The Cundy House	Old Bolsover	Conduit house	17th century	23 March 1989	SK4712370917; 53°14′00″N 1°17′44″W	1367442	The Cundy House More images
Church of St Michael	Pleasley	Church	12th century	8 July 1966	SK5042864572; 53°10′33″N 1°14′49″W	1108926	Church of St Michael More images
Church of St Leonard	Scarcliffe	Church	12th century	8 July 1966	SK4954368750; 53°12′49″N 1°15′34″W	1054908	Church of St Leonard More images
Carnfield Hall	South Normanton	House	Early 17th century	11 July 1951	SK4257056044; 53°06′00″N 1°21′56″W	1367071	Carnfield Hall More images
Church of St Michael	South Normanton	Church	13th century	8 July 1966	SK4422256961; 53°06′29″N 1°20′27″W	1108933	Church of St Michael More images
Park Hall	Spinkhill	Country house	17th century	26 August 1965	SK4626478794; 53°18′15″N 1°18′26″W	1372089	Park Hall More images
Whitwell Hall	Whitwell	Manor house	17th century	19 November 1951	SK5260976914; 53°17′12″N 1°12′44″W	1055849	Upload Photo

== See also ==
- Grade I listed buildings in Derbyshire
- Grade II* listed buildings in Amber Valley
- Grade II* listed buildings in Chesterfield
- Grade II* listed buildings in Derby
- Grade II* listed buildings in Derbyshire Dales
- Grade II* listed buildings in Erewash
- Grade II* listed buildings in High Peak
- Grade II* listed buildings in North East Derbyshire
- Grade II* listed buildings in South Derbyshire
