= Listed buildings in Old Bolsover =

Old Bolsover is a civil parish in the Bolsover District of Derbyshire, England. The parish contains 55 listed buildings that are recorded in the National Heritage List for England. Of these, one is listed at Grade I, the highest of the three grades, six are at Grade II*, the middle grade, and the others are at Grade II, the lowest grade. The parish contains the market town of Bolsover and the surrounding area, including the village of Shuttlewood. The older part of the town has been a market town since the medieval period, and the area of New Bolsover is a model village built between 1888 and 1893 for colliery workers. A row of six semi-detached houses was built for the managers, over 200 houses were built for the other workers in terraces forming three sides of a quadrangle, and community buildings were also erected. All these buildings are listed. The most prominent building in the parish is Bolsover Castle, a country house in the style of a castle, which is listed, together with associated structures, including five conduit houses. Most of the other listed buildings are houses, cottages, shops and associated structures, farmhouses and farm buildings. The rest include a church, a chapel, a former windmill and a nearby chimney, a war memorial, a school and a telephone kiosk.

== Key ==
| Grade | Criteria |
|---|---|
| I | Buildings of exceptional interest, sometimes considered to be internationally important |
| II* | Particularly important buildings of more than special interest |
| II | Buildings of national importance and special interest |

== Buildings ==
| Name and location | Photograph | Date | Notes | Grade |
|---|---|---|---|---|
| St Mary and St Laurence's Church; 53.22769°N 1.29073°W | | 13th century | The church has been extended and altered through the centuries, the Cavendish Chapel was added in 1618, and it was restored in 1878. The church was damaged by fire in 1897 and in 1960, following which the vestry was added. It is built in limestone with Welsh slate roofs, and consists of a nave, north and south aisles, a south chapel, a chancel with a north vestry, and a west steeple. The steeple has a tower with two stages, a west doorway with a chamfered surround and two orders of colonnettes, a staircase projection to the southeast, a string course, two-light bell openings, and a broach spire with two tiers of lucarnes. | II* |
| Bolsover Castle; 53.23139°N 1.29686°W | | 1612 | A country house in the style of a castle on the site of a medieval castle. The keep, known as the Little Castle, is in limestone, with a square plan, embattled parapets and tile roofs. There are square angle turrets and a larger square stair tower, all with pyramidal roofs. The inner ward, known as the Fountain Garden, is enclosed by massive walls, in the centre of which is the Venus Fountain. To the south is the Terrace Range which extends along the west boundary of the grounds, and attached at its south end and extending to the north east is the Riding House. The main entrance at the southeast is flanked by columns with vermiculated rusticated columns with ball finials. | I |
| 15–19 Cotton Street; 53.22863°N 1.29206°W | | 17th century | A group of three cottages in limestone with sandstone dressings, quoins, and a pantile roof with stone coped gables. There are two storeys and an L-shaped plan with a front of three bays, the left bay gabled. In the left bay is a doorway, two sash windows and a blind circular window above. The other two bays are symmetrical, and in the centre are paired doorways with a massive lintel and jambs. They are flanked by sash windows, and above the doorways is an inscribed and dated plaque and a blind decorative circle. | II |
| 49 High Street; 53.22811°N 1.29272°W | | 17th century | The house, which has been remodelled, is in limestone with sandstone dressings, quoins, a moulded eaves cornice, and a tile roof with coped gables. There are two storeys and three bays. The central doorway has a moulded surround and a moulded hood mould, and the windows are sashes with wedge lintels. | II |
| 38 Market Place; 53.22927°N 1.29208°W | — | 17th century | A house, later a shop, it is in red brick and stone, and has a roof of Welsh slate and pantile with two coped gables. There are two storeys and a T-shaped plan. In the ground floor is a shop front, and the upper floor contains a segmental-headed sash window. | II |
| 40 Market Place; 53.22921°N 1.29215°W | — | 17th century | A house and a shop in stone and rendered brick with sandstone dressings and a pantile roof with coped gables and plain kneelers. There are two storeys and a front of three bays. In the ground floor is a shop front and a cart entrance on the left, and the upper floor contains three sash windows. | II |
| 42, 42A, 44 and 46 Market Place; 53.22909°N 1.29225°W | — | 17th century | A row of four shops in limestone with sandstone dressings and a pantile roof. There are two storeys and five bays. In the ground floor are shop fronts, a doorway and a sash window. The upper floor contains five sash windows, one of them horizontally-sliding. | II |
| 32 and 36 Town End; 53.22902°N 1.28974°W | — | 17th century | A building with a shop at the front and two cottages at the rear, it is in limestone with quoins, and a pantile roof with coped gables and moulded kneelers. There are two storeys, an L-shaped plan, and a front of two bays. On the front is a shop front in the ground floor and two casement windows above. In the left return are the remains of two mullioned windows, and a blocked single-light window. At the rear are two doorways and various windows, and inside there is a raised cruck truss. | II |
| Conduit house (north); 53.22893°N 1.29497°W | | 17th century (probable) | The conduit house was involved with the supply of water to Bolsover Castle, and is in limestone with sandstone dressings. It has massive quoins, a rectangular opening at the rear, and the remains of a coped gabled roof and a tunnel vault. | II* |
| Conduit House southeast of St Bernadette's Church; 53.22722°N 1.29235°W | — | 17th century (probable) | The conduit house was involved with the supply of water to Bolsover Castle, and is in limestone with sandstone dressings. It has massive quoins, a square-headed doorway with a quoined surround and a lintel, above which is a square opening, At the rear is a rectangular opening, and there are the remains of a coped gabled roof and a tunnel vault. | II* |
| Conduit house behind 85 New Station Road; 53.22600°N 1.29064°W | — | 17th century (probable) | The conduit house was involved with the supply of water to Bolsover Castle, and is in limestone with sandstone dressings. It has massive quoins, a square-headed doorway with a quoined surround and a lintel, above which is a square opening, At the rear is a rectangular opening, and there are the remains of a coped gabled roof and a tunnel vault. | II* |
| Conduit house (south); 53.22483°N 1.28908°W | — | 17th century (probable) | The conduit house was involved with the supply of water to Bolsover Castle, and is in limestone with sandstone dressings. It has massive quoins, a square-headed doorway with a quoined surround and a lintel, above which is a square opening, At the rear is a rectangular opening, and there are the remains of a coped gabled roof. | II* |
| The Cundy House; 53.23324°N 1.29549°W | | 17th century (probable) | The Cundy House is a conduit house involved with the supply of water to Bolsover Castle. It is in limestone with sandstone dressings on a chamfered plinth, and has a rectangular plan. The building has angle quoins and coped gables. In the gable end is an entrance with a lintel and a keystone.. | II* |
| Former Presbyterian Chapel; 53.22921°N 1.29370°W | — | 1662 (possible) | The chapel, later converted into a house, is in red brick with quoins, and a tile roof with twin gables. There is a single storey, on the west front are two rectangular windows under slight arched lintels, and there are two windows high on the south front, the lintels forming a band. | II |
| 2–4 Church Street; 53.22860°N 1.29136°W | | Mid 18th century | A house, later divided, in limestone with sandstone dressings and a slate roof. There are two storeys and three bays. The central doorway has massive quoins and a lintel, and a divided fanlight. The windows are sashes with wedge lintels. | II |
| 39 High Street; 53.22841°N 1.29319°W | | Mid 18th century | The house is in limestone with sandstone dressings, and has a pantile roof with coped gables and moulded kneelers. There are two storeys and three bays. The doorway has massive jambs and a lintel, and the windows are cross windows. | II |
| Pigeoncote behind 39 High Street; 53.22827°N 1.29323°W | — | 18th century | The pigeoncote is in limestone and is a small rectangular building with a pitched roof. In the west gable end is a 20th-century opening. | II |
| 28 Market Place; 53.22922°N 1.29150°W | — | Mid 18th century | A house, later a shop with living accommodation above, it is in limestone with quoins, and a Welsh slate roof with coped gables and moulded kneelers. There are two storeys and three bays. In the ground floor is a central doorway flanked by shop fronts, and the upper floor contains sash windows. | II |
| 31 Market Place; 53.22919°N 1.29265°W | | Mid 18th century | The house, later an office, is in limestone, and has a Welsh slate roof with coped gables and plain kneelers. There are two storeys and attics, and three bays. The central doorway has a moulded surround, it is flanked by 20th-century windows, and in the upper floor are casement windows. Above them are two gabled dormers with decorative bargeboards and finials, and at the rear is a mullioned and transomed stair window. | II |
| Lime Kiln Fields Mill; 53.23710°N 1.29231°W | | 1793 | A former windmill, it is in limestone with sandstone dressings and a red brick cornice. The mill is circular and tapering, and has four storeys. It contains four rows of rectangular openings under plain lintels. | II |
| St Mary's House; 53.22961°N 1.29508°W | | Early 19th century | The house is in sandstone with quoins and a hipped Welsh slate roof. There are two storeys and three bays. The windows have pointed heads and contain Gothic tracery. In the centre is a doorway with a pointed arch, polygonal colonnettes, and a moulded hood mould, above which is a lancet window. The outer bays contain full height canted bay windows. | II |
| Woodhouse Farmhouse; 53.24508°N 1.30910°W | | Early 19th century | The farmhouse is in sandstone with quoins and a Welsh slate roof. There are two storeys and a symmetrical front of three bays. The central round-arched doorway has impost blocks and a keystone, and the windows are sashes with channelled wedge lintels. | II |
| Chimney, Lime Kiln Fields Mill; 53.23719°N 1.29220°W | — | Late 19th century | The chimney is red brick and has a square plan. As it rises, it tapers, and at the top is a raised brick band and stepped brick top. | II |
| 2, 4 and 6 New Bolsover and walls 53.22861°N 1.30557°W | — | c. 1891–94 | A terrace of three cottages in red brick with some stone dressings, a decorative floor band, a sawtooth eaves cornice, and a slate roof with decorative ridge cresting. There are two storeys and attics. In the ground floor are three-light casement windows and doorways with fanlights. The upper floor contains cross casements under chamfered lintels, and above are gabled dormers. At the rear, walls enclose the back yards. | II |
| 7–21 New Bolsover and walls 53.22901°N 1.30516°W | — | c. 1891–94 | A terrace of eight cottages in red brick with some stone dressings, a decorative floor band, a sawtooth eaves cornice, and a slate roof with decorative ridge cresting. There are two storeys and attics, and the cottages are treated as pairs with symmetrical fronts, stepped down a hill. Each pair has two three-light casement windows flanked by doorways with fanlights. In the upper floor are two cross casements under chamfered lintels, and above is a pair of gabled dormers. At the rear, walls enclose the back yards. | II |
| 8–22 New Bolsover and walls 53.22865°N 1.30511°W | — | c. 1891–94 | A terrace of eight cottages in red brick with some stone dressings, a decorative floor band, a sawtooth eaves cornice, and a slate roof with decorative ridge cresting. There are two storeys and attics, and the cottages are treated as pairs with symmetrical fronts, stepped down a hill. Each pair has two three-light casement windows flanked by doorways with fanlights. In the upper floor are two cross casements under chamfered lintels, and above is a pair of gabled dormers. At the rear, walls enclose the back yards. | II |
| 23–37 New Bolsover and walls 53.22904°N 1.30453°W | — | c. 1891–94 | A terrace of eight cottages in red brick with some stone dressings, a decorative floor band, a sawtooth eaves cornice, and a slate roof with decorative ridge cresting. There are two storeys and attics, and the cottages are treated as pairs with symmetrical fronts, stepped down a hill. Each pair has two three-light casement windows flanked by doorways with fanlights. In the upper floor are two cross casements under chamfered lintels, and above is a pair of gabled dormers. At the rear, walls enclose the back yards. | II |
| 24–38 New Bolsover and walls 53.22866°N 1.30452°W | — | c. 1891–94 | A terrace of eight cottages in red brick with some stone dressings, a decorative floor band, a sawtooth eaves cornice, and a slate roof with decorative ridge cresting. There are two storeys and attics, and the cottages are treated as pairs with symmetrical fronts, stepped down a hill. Each pair has two three-light casement windows flanked by doorways with fanlights. In the upper floor are two cross casements under chamfered lintels, and above is a pair of gabled dormers. At the rear, walls enclose the back yards. | II |
| 39–53 New Bolsover and walls 53.22907°N 1.30397°W | — | c. 1891–94 | A terrace of eight cottages in red brick with some stone dressings, a decorative floor band, a sawtooth eaves cornice, and a slate roof with decorative ridge cresting. There are two storeys and attics, and the cottages are treated as pairs with symmetrical fronts, stepped down a hill. Each pair has two three-light casement windows flanked by doorways with fanlights. In the upper floor are two cross casements under chamfered lintels, and above is a pair of gabled dormers. At the rear, walls enclose the back yards. | II |
| 40–54 New Bolsover and walls 53.22870°N 1.30391°W | — | c. 1891–94 | A terrace of eight cottages in red brick with some stone dressings, a decorative floor band, a sawtooth eaves cornice, and a slate roof with decorative ridge cresting. There are two storeys and attics, and the cottages are treated as pairs with symmetrical fronts, stepped down a hill. Each pair has two three-light casement windows flanked by doorways with fanlights. In the upper floor are two cross casements under chamfered lintels, and above is a pair of gabled dormers. At the rear, walls enclose the back yards. | II |
| 55–67 New Bolsover and walls 53.22910°N 1.30336°W | — | c. 1891–94 | A terrace of seven cottages in red brick with some stone dressings, a decorative floor band, a sawtooth eaves cornice, and a slate roof with decorative ridge cresting. There are two storeys and attics, and the cottages are treated as pairs with symmetrical fronts, stepped down a hill. Each pair has two three-light casement windows flanked by doorways with fanlights. In the upper floor are two cross casements under chamfered lintels, and above is a pair of gabled dormers. At the rear, walls enclose the back yards. | II |
| 56–70 New Bolsover and walls 53.22845°N 1.30339°W | — | c. 1891–94 | A terrace of eight cottages in red brick with some stone dressings, a decorative floor band, a sawtooth eaves cornice, and a slate roof with decorative ridge cresting. There are two storeys and attics, and the cottages are treated as pairs with symmetrical fronts, stepped down a hill. Each pair has two three-light casement windows flanked by doorways with fanlights. In the upper floor are two cross casements under chamfered lintels, and above is a pair of gabled dormers. At the rear, walls enclose the back yards. | II |
| 69–81 New Bolsover and walls 53.22890°N 1.30305°W | — | c. 1891–94 | A terrace of seven cottages in red brick with some stone dressings, a decorative floor band, a sawtooth eaves cornice, and a slate roof with decorative ridge cresting. There are two storeys and attics, and the cottages are treated as pairs with symmetrical fronts. Each pair has two three-light casement windows flanked by doorways with fanlights. In the upper floor are two cross casements under chamfered lintels. At the rear, walls enclose the back yards. | II |
| 72–86 New Bolsover and walls 53.22810°N 1.30340°W | — | c. 1891–94 | A terrace of eight cottages in red brick with some stone dressings, a decorative floor band, a sawtooth eaves cornice, and a slate roof with decorative ridge cresting. There are two storeys and attics, and the cottages are treated as pairs with symmetrical fronts, stepped down a hill. Each pair has two three-light casement windows flanked by doorways with fanlights. In the upper floor are two cross casements under chamfered lintels, and above is a pair of gabled dormers. At the rear, walls enclose the back yards. | II |
| 83–97 New Bolsover and walls 53.22854°N 1.30287°W | — | c. 1891–94 | A terrace of eight cottages in red brick with some stone dressings, a decorative floor band, a sawtooth eaves cornice, and a slate roof with decorative ridge cresting. There are two storeys and attics, and the cottages are treated as pairs with symmetrical fronts. Each pair has two three-light casement windows flanked by doorways with fanlights. In the upper floor are two cross casements under chamfered lintels. At the rear, walls enclose the back yards. | II |
| 88–102 New Bolsover and walls 53.22772°N 1.30334°W | — | c. 1891–94 | A terrace of eight cottages in red brick with some stone dressings, a decorative floor band, a sawtooth eaves cornice, and a slate roof with decorative ridge cresting. There are two storeys and attics, and the cottages are treated as pairs with symmetrical fronts, stepped down a hill. Each pair has two three-light casement windows flanked by doorways with fanlights. In the upper floor are two cross casements under chamfered lintels, and above is a pair of gabled dormers. At the rear, walls enclose the back yards. | II |
| 99–113 New Bolsover and walls 53.22813°N 1.30280°W | — | c. 1891–94 | A terrace of eight cottages in red brick with some stone dressings, a decorative floor band, a sawtooth eaves cornice, and a slate roof with decorative ridge cresting. There are two storeys and attics, and the cottages are treated as pairs with symmetrical fronts. Each pair has two three-light casement windows flanked by doorways with fanlights. In the upper floor are two cross casements under chamfered lintels. At the rear, walls enclose the back yards. | II |
| 104–114 New Bolsover and walls 53.22745°N 1.30375°W | — | c. 1891–94 | A terrace of eight cottages in red brick with some stone dressings, a decorative floor band, a sawtooth eaves cornice, and a slate roof with decorative ridge cresting. There are two storeys and attics, and the cottages are treated as pairs with symmetrical fronts, stepped down a hill. Each pair has two three-light casement windows flanked by doorways with fanlights. In the upper floor are two cross casements under chamfered lintels, and above is a pair of gabled dormers. At the rear, walls enclose the back yards. | II |
| 115–129 New Bolsover and walls 53.22774°N 1.30276°W | — | c. 1891–94 | A terrace of eight cottages in red brick with some stone dressings, a decorative floor band, a sawtooth eaves cornice, and a slate roof with decorative ridge cresting. There are two storeys and attics, and the cottages are treated as pairs with symmetrical fronts. Each pair has two three-light casement windows flanked by doorways with fanlights. In the upper floor are two cross casements under chamfered lintels. At the rear, walls enclose the back yards. | II |
| 120–134 New Bolsover and walls 53.22742°N 1.30435°W | — | c. 1891–94 | A terrace of eight cottages in red brick with some stone dressings, a decorative floor band, a sawtooth eaves cornice, and a slate roof with decorative ridge cresting. There are two storeys and attics, and the cottages are treated as pairs with symmetrical fronts, stepped down a hill. Each pair has two three-light casement windows flanked by doorways with fanlights. In the upper floor are two cross casements under chamfered lintels, and above is a pair of gabled dormers. At the rear, walls enclose the back yards. | II |
| 131–143 New Bolsover and walls 53.22737°N 1.30272°W | — | c. 1891–94 | A terrace of eight cottages in red brick with some stone dressings, a decorative floor band, a sawtooth eaves cornice, and a slate roof with decorative ridge cresting. There are two storeys and attics, and the cottages are treated as pairs with symmetrical fronts. Each pair has two three-light casement windows flanked by doorways with fanlights. In the upper floor are two cross casements under chamfered lintels. At the rear, walls enclose the back yards. | II |
| 136–150 New Bolsover and walls 53.22739°N 1.30495°W | — | c. 1891–94 | A terrace of eight cottages in red brick with some stone dressings, a decorative floor band, a sawtooth eaves cornice, and a slate roof with decorative ridge cresting. There are two storeys and attics, and the cottages are treated as pairs with symmetrical fronts, stepped down a hill. Each pair has two three-light casement windows flanked by doorways with fanlights. In the upper floor are two cross casements under chamfered lintels, and above is a pair of gabled dormers. At the rear, walls enclose the back yards. | II |
| 145–157 New Bolsover and walls 53.22713°N 1.30308°W | — | c. 1891–94 | A terrace of seven cottages in red brick with some stone dressings, a decorative floor band, a sawtooth eaves cornice, and a slate roof with decorative ridge cresting. There are two storeys and attics, and the cottages are treated as pairs with symmetrical fronts, stepped down a hill. Each pair has two three-light casement windows flanked by doorways with fanlights. In the upper floor are two cross casements under chamfered lintelss. At the rear, walls enclose the back yards. | II |
| 152–166 New Bolsover and walls 53.22736°N 1.30555°W | — | c. 1891–94 | A terrace of eight cottages in red brick with some stone dressings, a decorative floor band, a sawtooth eaves cornice, and a slate roof with decorative ridge cresting. There are two storeys and attics, and the cottages are treated as pairs with symmetrical fronts, stepped down a hill. Each pair has two three-light casement windows flanked by doorways with fanlights. In the upper floor are two cross casements under chamfered lintels, and above is a pair of gabled dormers. At the rear, walls enclose the back yards. | II |
| 159–173 New Bolsover and walls 53.22709°N 1.30367°W | — | c. 1891–94 | A terrace of eight cottages in red brick with some stone dressings, a decorative floor band, a sawtooth eaves cornice, and a slate roof with decorative ridge cresting. There are two storeys and attics, and the cottages are treated as pairs with symmetrical fronts, stepped down a hill. Each pair has two three-light casement windows flanked by doorways with fanlights. In the upper floor are two cross casements under chamfered lintelss. At the rear, walls enclose the back yards. | II |
| 175–189 New Bolsover and walls 53.22706°N 1.30425°W | — | c. 1891–94 | A terrace of eight cottages in red brick with some stone dressings, a decorative floor band, a sawtooth eaves cornice, and a slate roof with decorative ridge cresting. There are two storeys and attics, and the cottages are treated as pairs with symmetrical fronts, stepped down a hill. Each pair has two three-light casement windows flanked by doorways with fanlights. In the upper floor are two cross casements under chamfered lintelss. At the rear, walls enclose the back yards. | II |
| 191–205 New Bolsover and walls 53.22702°N 1.30496°W | — | c. 1891–94 | A terrace of eight cottages in red brick with some stone dressings, a decorative floor band, a sawtooth eaves cornice, and a slate roof with decorative ridge cresting. There are two storeys and attics, and the cottages are treated as pairs with symmetrical fronts, stepped down a hill. Each pair has two three-light casement windows flanked by doorways with fanlights. In the upper floor are two cross casements under chamfered lintelss. At the rear, walls enclose the back yards. | II |
| 207–221 New Bolsover and walls 53.22699°N 1.30549°W | — | c. 1891–94 | A terrace of eight cottages in red brick with some stone dressings, a decorative floor band, a sawtooth eaves cornice, and a slate roof with decorative ridge cresting. There are two storeys and attics, and the cottages are treated as pairs with symmetrical fronts, stepped down a hill. Each pair has two three-light casement windows flanked by doorways with fanlights. In the upper floor are two cross casements under chamfered lintelss. At the rear, walls enclose the back yards. | II |
| Former stores, 1–5 New Bolsover and walls 53.22894°N 1.30597°W | | c. 1891–94 | The former shop and the three cottages at the rear are in red brick with some stone dressings and tile roofs. The shop has two storeys and a symmetrical front of two bays. In the centre is a round-headed arch with imposts and a keystone, and a decorative inscribed panel above. The arch is flanked by wide basket-arched windows with keystones, and above them are oriel windows, and gables with applied timber framing. In the left return are four windows, and in the upper floor is a window rising into a gable. Further to the left is a basket-arched window, over which is a timber-framed gable containing small windows. At the rear of the shop are three cottages with two storeys, one bay each, casement windows, and walls enclosing the back yards. | II |
| The Villas; 53.23117°N 1.30476°W | — | c. 1893–94 | Six pairs of semi-detached houses in red brick, one house stuccoed, with ornamental eaves, gable cornices and Welsh slate roofs. There are two storeys and each pair of houses has a symmetrical front of four bays. Each inner bay is gabled and contains a canted bay window with a slate pentice roof, over which is a window with a keystone. The outer bay contains a doorway with a segmental head and a small window, both with a keystone, and above them is a terracotta plaque with a date. At the rear are extensions and outbuildings. | II |
| Bainbridge Hall; 53.22666°N 1.30211°W | — | c. 1894 | An orphanage, later used for other purposes, it is in red brick, partly pebbledashed, with stone dressings and tile roofs. There is a front of nine bays, the middle three bays with two storeys, and the outer bays with a single storey. In the centre is a recessed porch with a moulded surround and keystones, over which is a three-light casement window. The flanking bays are gabled, and contain two-storey canted bay windows. The outer wings contain casement windows, and the left wing has a cross window rising to a dormer in a round-arched gable. | II |
| Former Sandy's Bar; 53.22859°N 1.30592°W | | c. 1894 | The Miners' Welfare building, later a public house renamed The Sportsman, is in red brick with blue brick dressings on a chamfered plinth, with a red tile roof. There are two storeys, and three irregular bays. The left bay has a square bay window, above which is a gable with applied timber framing containing a three-light window. Steps lead up to a doorway in the middle bay with a square bay window to the right, in front of which is a canopy on two timber columns. Further to the right is a five-light casement window in a recessed segmental arch, and in the upper floor is an oriel window under a gable with applied timber framing containing a two-light window. In the right return are two segmental-headed windows, a large five-light window above, and to the right a bow window. | II |
| War memorial 53.22931°N 1.29240°W | | c. 1918 | The war memorial in Market Place is to a standard design by Reginald Blomfield. It is in Portland stone, and has an octagonal two-tier plinth on two steps. On the plinth is a cross with a polygonal shaft and cross-piece, and a bronze sword on the north face. On the plinth are metal plaques inscribed with the names of those lost in the two World Wars. | II |
| South block, Brockley Primary School; 53.25216°N 1.29923°W | — | 1927 | The school, designed by George H. Widdows, it is in red brick with mansard roofs in Welsh slate and tile. There is a U-shaped plan, with a front range and rear classroom ranges. The front range has a central block with four bays and full height windows, and is flanked by two-storey blocks with full-height canted bay windows. The classroom ranges have a single storey, continuous high level windows, and open verandah corridors on each side, linking with a verandah at the rear of the main block. | II |
| Telephone kiosk 53.22902°N 1.30581°W | — | 1935 | The K6 type telephone kiosk in New Bolsover was designed by Giles Gilbert Scott. Constructed in cast iron with a square plan and a dome, it has three unperforated crowns in the top panels. | II |
