= Bentinck, Derbyshire =

Village in Derbyshire, England

Coordinates: 53.256°N 1.302°W

Bentinck
- Location within Derbyshire
- Population: around 100
- District: Bolsover
- Shire county: Derbyshire
- Region: East Midlands
- Country: England
- Sovereign state: United Kingdom
- Post town: CHESTERFIELD
- Postcode district: S44
- Dialling code: 01246
- Police: Derbyshire
- Fire: Derbyshire
- Ambulance: East Midlands
- UK Parliament: Bolsover

Bentinck is a village in Derbyshire, England. Located north of Bolsover, it consists of two rows of terrace houses, a park and some garages. Bentinck is near Shuttlewood and Stanfree and located on Woodthorpe Road to Mastin Moor. It is located near two motorway junctions of the M1, J29a and J30. It is also close to Chesterfield and the city of Sheffield. The main employer of the village up until a few years ago was Coalite, and before that the mining industry.

The nearest airport is Robin Hood Airport at Doncaster and the nearest train and bus stations are in Chesterfield. The village has a link via buses to Bolsover and Chesterfield. The village/hamlet was built in the 19th century to house the local miners from the colliery at Shuttlewood. There was a road which is now abandoned linking the village to the mine.
