= Alf Saxby =

English footballer (1897–1979)

Personal information
- Full name: Alfred Saxby
- Date of birth: 11 March 1897
- Place of birth: Bolsover, England
- Date of death: 1979 (aged 83–84)
- Position: Full-back

Senior career*
Years	Team	Apps	(Gls)
1919–1920	New Bolsover Wesleyans		
1920–1921	Bolsover Colliery		
1921–1928	Chesterfield	186	(0)
Total		186	(0)
- * Club domestic league appearances and goals

Alfred Saxby (11 March 1897 – 1979) was an English footballer who played in the Football League for Chesterfield.
