= Old Bolsover =

Civil parish in Derbyshire, England

Coordinates: 53.2280°N 1.2923°W

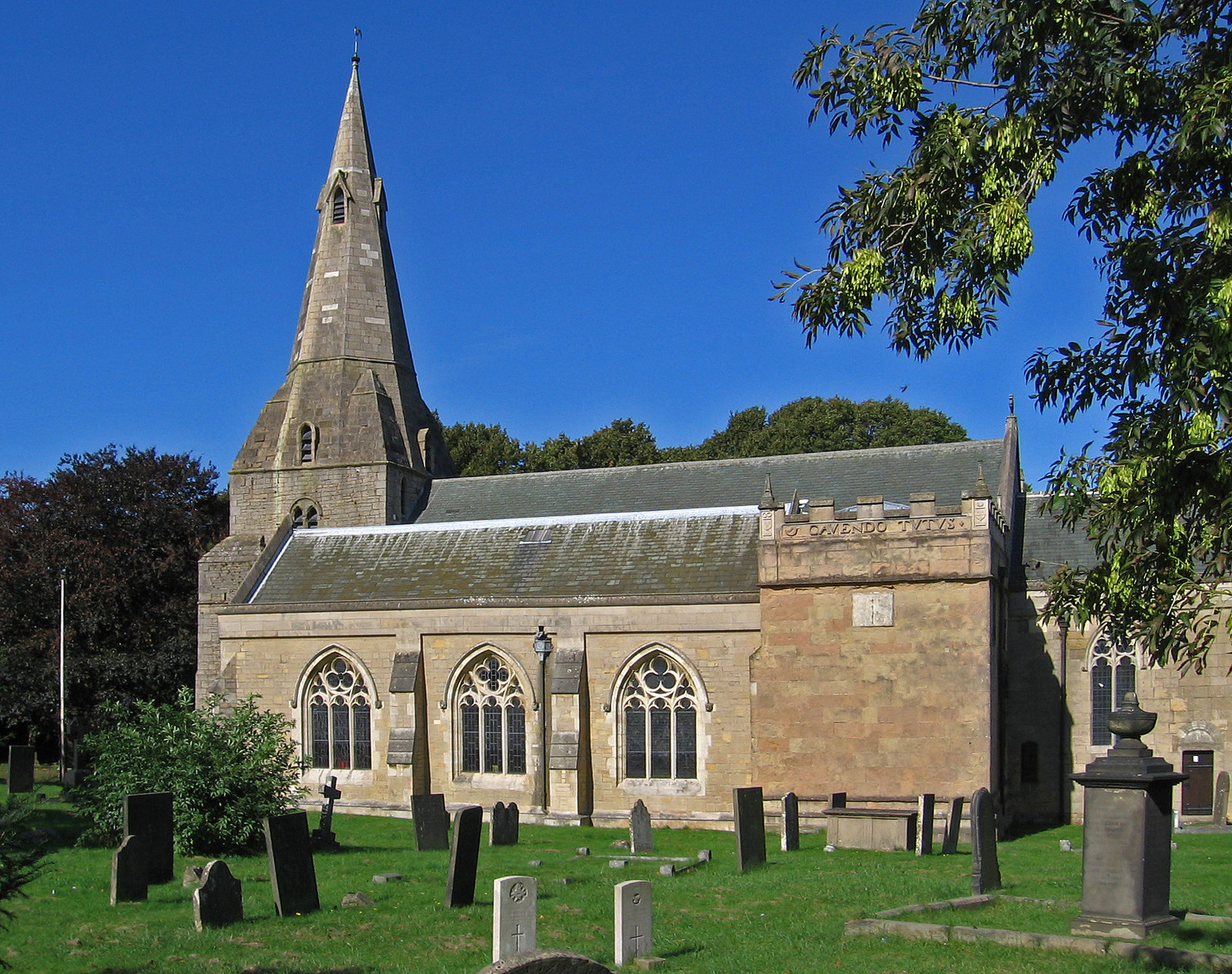
- Bolsover

- Location within Derbyshire
- Interactive map of Old Bolsover
- Area: 18.30 km^{2} (7.07 sq mi)
- Population: 11,673 (2011 census)
  - Density: 638/km^{2} (1,650/sq mi)
- Civil parish: Old Bolsover
- District: Bolsover
- Shire county: Derbyshire
- Region: East Midlands
- Country: England
- Sovereign state: United Kingdom

Old Bolsover is a civil parish in the Bolsover, in the county of Derbyshire, England. It includes the town of Bolsover and the villages of Carr Vale, Shuttlewood, Stanfree, Bentinck and Whaley.

The parish has an area of 18.30 km^{2} (7.07 sq mi).

At the 2011 United Kingdom census the parish had a population of 11,673.

== Old Bolsover Town Council ==
Old Bolsover Town Council is the parish council for the civil parish of Old Bolsover.

Other local government functions are the responsibility of Bolsover District Council and Derbyshire County Council.

The Town Council was formed on 1 April 1974 when the civil parish of Old Bolsover was created as a successor parish to the former Bolsover Urban District Council. The new parish council exercised its right to designate itself a town council. The previous civil parish was called Bolsover but was reformed as Old Bolsover with the same boundaries.

The Town Council has been meeting in the Town Hall on Cotton Street since 1976.
