= HMS Bentinck =

Three ships of the Royal Navy have borne the name HMS Bentinck, named in honor of John Bentinck:

- HMS Bentinck (1832) was an iron paddle vessel launched in 1832. She was commanded by Richard Collinson and used to survey significant portions of the China Coast. She was purchased in 1842 and renamed HMS Plover. She was put up for sale in 1855.
- HMS Bentinck was to have been a Captain-class frigate, built by the United States under Lend-lease. She was launched in 1942 but was retained as the Evarts-class destroyer escort USS Brennan.
- HMS Bentinck (K314) was a Captain-class frigate launched in 1943 and returned to the US Navy in 1946.
