= Listed buildings in South Normanton =

South Normanton is a civil parish in the Bolsover District of Derbyshire, England. The parish contains eight listed buildings that are recorded in the National Heritage List for England. Of these, two are listed at Grade II*, the middle of the three grades, and the others are at Grade II, the lowest grade. The parish contains the village of South Normanton and the surrounding area, and the listed buildings consist of a country house and its coach house, a church, a former windmill, a former farmhouse, a school and two mileposts.

== Key ==
| Grade | Criteria |
|---|---|
| II* | Particularly important buildings of more than special interest |
| II | Buildings of national importance and special interest |

== Buildings ==
| Name and location | Photograph | Date | Notes | Grade |
|---|---|---|---|---|
| St Michael's Church; 53.10804°N 1.34092°W | | 13th century | The church has been extended and altered through the centuries, particularly with a partial rebuilding in 1878. It is built in sandstone, the roofs of the aisles are in lead, and elsewhere they are tiled. The church consists of a nave, north and south aisles, a south porch, a chancel with a south organ bay, a north chapel and vestry, and a west tower. The tower has two stages between which is a chamfered band, diagonal buttresses, and a west doorway with a chamfered surround and a pointed arch, over which is a three-light Perpendicular window with a moulded surround and a small stair window. The upper stage contains two-light bell openings with cusped Y-tracery, and a clock face on the south side. Above is a string course with gargoyles, and embattled parapets with crocketed corner pinnacles. | II* |
| Carnfield Hall; 53.09992°N 1.36556°W | | Early 17th century | A country house that was refronted in the 18th century. It is in stone with quoins and tile roofs with moulded stone copings on moulded kneelers. There are two storeys and attics and an L-shaped plan, with a main front of nine bays, and a long rear wing on the left. The front has a three-bay central range with a parapet and a moulded eaves cornice, and the outer bays project, each under a double gable. In the centre is a doorway with a moulded surround, a cornice, and a segmental open pediment on consoles. The windows are sashes in eared architraves with raised keystones. In the left return and the rear wing are windows that are mullioned or mullioned and transomed, in addition to sashes. | II* |
| Hilltop Farmhouse; 53.10713°N 1.32432°W | — | 17th century or earlier | The farmhouse, which was later extended, refronted and converted into a private house, has a timber framed core, walls of sandstone, partly rendered, and a tile roof. There are two storeys and a T-shaped plan, with a front range of four bays and a rear range. The doorway has a rectangular fanlight, and the windows on the front are sashes with painted wedge lintels. At the rear are a mix of windows, including casements. | II |
| Coach house, Carnfield Hall; 53.10000°N 1.36622°W | — | Mid 18th century | The coach house and stable block, now used for other purposes, are in sandstone with quoins, and a Welsh slate roof with stone coped gables and moulded kneelers. There are two storeys and nine bays. On the front are three semicircular arches with chamfered surrounds, quoined jambs and raised keystones, the middle arch a passageway, and mullioned windows with casements. | II |
| Former windmill 53.10817°N 1.34176°W | | Late 18th to early 19th century | The windmill, which has been converted into a house, is in sandstone with a conical roof. It has a circular plan and is tapering, with four stages and iron bands. The doorway has a plain lintel, and the windows are square. | II |
| Milepost north of Carnfield Hall; 53.10062°N 1.36573°W | | Early 19th century | The milepost on the south side of Carnfield Hill (B6019 road) is in cast iron. It has a triangular plan, and a sloping top. On the top is inscribed "SOUTH NORMANTON", and on the sides are the distances to Alfreton and Mansfield. | II |
| Milepost, The Common; 53.10051°N 1.34009°W | | Early 19th century | The milepost on the south side of The Common (B6019 road) is in cast iron. It has a triangular plan, and a sloping top. On the top is inscribed "SOUTH NORMANTON", and on the sides are the distances to Alfreton and Mansfield. | II |
| Glebe Junior School; 53.10306°N 1.34201°W | | 1911 | The school, which was designed by George H. Widdows, is in banded red and blue brick with dressings in stone and brick, and steeply pitched tile roofs with ridge ventilators. There is a butterfly plan, consisting of a central two-storey hall range and four single-storey classroom ranges branching from it. On the three-bay gabled hall range is an octagonal cupola with a leaded base, arcaded sides, and a domed leaded roof with a weathervane. The porch has a doorway with a segmental arch of radiating voussoirs, and embattled parapets over an inscription. The windows in the classroom ranges are mullioned and transomed, and there are gabled dormers with hipped roofs. | II |
