= St Mary and St Laurence's Church, Bolsover =

Anglican Church in Derbyshire, England

St Mary and St Laurence’s Church, Bolsover
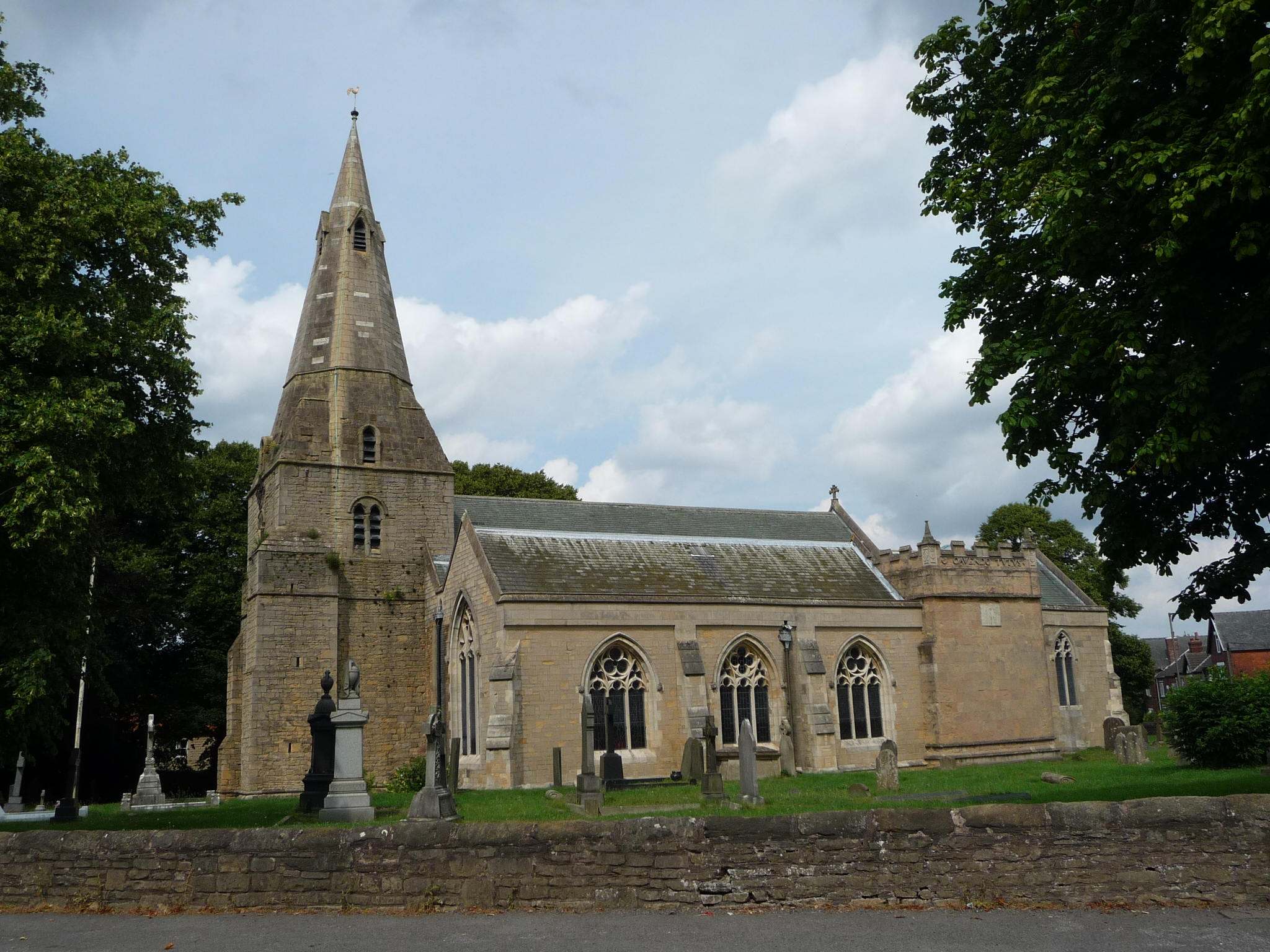
- St Mary and St Laurence’s Church, Bolsover

- Location within Derbyshire
- 53°13′39.3″N 01°17′27″W
- OS grid reference: SK 47442 70306
- Location: Bolsover, Derbyshire
- Country: England
- Denomination: Church of England

History
- Dedication: St Mary the Virgin and St Laurence

Architecture
- Heritage designation: Grade II* listed
- Architect: Louis Ambler

Administration
- Province: Canterbury
- Diocese: Derby
- Archdeaconry: East Derbyshire
- Deanery: Hardwick
- Parish: Bolsover

St Mary and St Laurence's Church, Bolsover is a Grade II* listed parish church in the Church of England in Bolsover, Derbyshire.

== History ==
The church is mediaeval, dating from the 13th and 14th centuries, with the Cavendish chapel of 1624, a rebuilding after a fire in 1897 by Louis Ambler and a further restoration after a fire in 1961–62.

The church was closed for restoration from early in 1877 which took place under the supervision of John Brightmore Mitchell-Withers, architect of Sheffield. The chancel arch was rebuilt, adding an organ and chapel. The chancel was completely renovated. The floor was laid with tiles and the seating was renewed. The roofs were repaired and covered by red Staffordshire tiling. The work was carried out by Shillitoe and Morgan of Campstall, Doncaster. New heating apparatus by Stuart and Smith of Sheffield was installed, with gas lighting by Hydes and Wigfull of Sheffield. The bells were recast by Taylor of Loughborough, a clock provided by Smith of Derby, and the organ enlarged by Foster and Andrews of Hull. The total cost of the restoration was around £6,000 (equivalent to £4,734,000 in 2025). The church reopened on 16 July 1878.

The church was destroyed by fire in January 1897 but fortunately, the Cavendish chapel of 1624 was saved. The church was rebuilt by the architect Louis Ambler starting on 9 September 1897 and was consecrated by the Bishop of Southwell on 21 September 1898.

The church was again badly damaged by fire on 13 January 1960 when the east end of the church, the vestry and high altar were destroyed, and half the slate and timber roof were damaged.

== Cavendish chapel ==
The chapel was built around 1624 with a Jacobean style roof to house the remains of the Cavendish family. It contains monuments and memorials to:

- Charles Cavendish d. 1617 (son of Bess of Hardwick and Sir William Cavendish) A standing wall monument (south wall).
- Henry Cavendish, 2nd Duke of Newcastle, his wife and one of his daughters. (Erected 1727).
- Three members of the Cavendish Bentinck family (east wall, a stone C19 monument)

== Organ ==
A new organ was installed in 1867

After the fire in 1897, a new organ was provided by Mr. C. Lowe of Sheffield. This was then replaced by a new organ in 1921 by Brindley and Co of Sheffield at a cost of £1,500 (equivalent to £63,500 in 2025).

The current organ was built by Henry Willis & Sons in 1962. This was fitted with a new transmission system in 1992 by George Sixsmith.

== Bells ==
The peal of 8 bells by John Taylor and Co of Loughborough includes 6 from 1898 and 2 from 1902.

== Graveyard ==
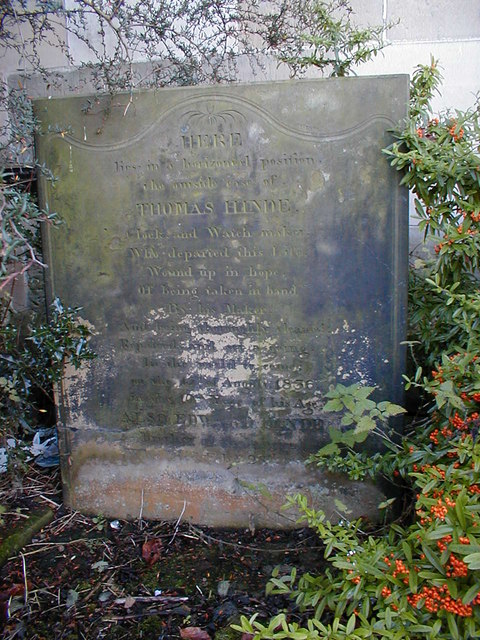
Gravestone for Thomas Hindle, watchmaker

The graveyard contains a headstone to Thomas Hinde (d. 1836) clock and watchmaker with the amusing inscription:

Here lies in a horizontal position the outside case of Thomas Hinde, Clock and Watchmaker, who departed this life wound up in the hope of being taken in hand by his Maker and being thoroughly cleaned, repaired and set a-going in the world to come. On the 15th of August 1836 in the 19th year of his life.

== See also ==
- Grade II* listed buildings in Bolsover (district)
- Listed buildings in Old Bolsover
