= Carr Vale =

Village in Derbyshire, England

Coordinates: 53.224°N 1.303°W

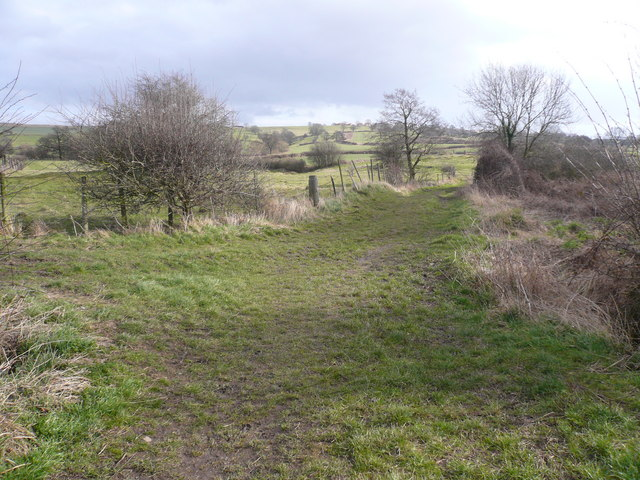
- Footpath view near Carr Vale.

- Location within Derbyshire
- OS grid reference: SK466698
- District: Bolsover
- Shire county: Derbyshire
- Region: East Midlands
- Country: England
- Sovereign state: United Kingdom
- Post town: CHESTERFIELD
- Postcode district: S44
- Dialling code: 01246
- Police: Derbyshire
- Fire: Derbyshire
- Ambulance: East Midlands
- UK Parliament: Bolsover

Carr Vale is a small village attached to the New Bolsover model village, Bolsover, Derbyshire, England. It is under Bolsover town.

It was begun in the late nineteenth century to house miners of the Bolsover Mining Company.
