= Bolsover Hospital =

- Derbyshire Community Health Services NHS Foundation Trust
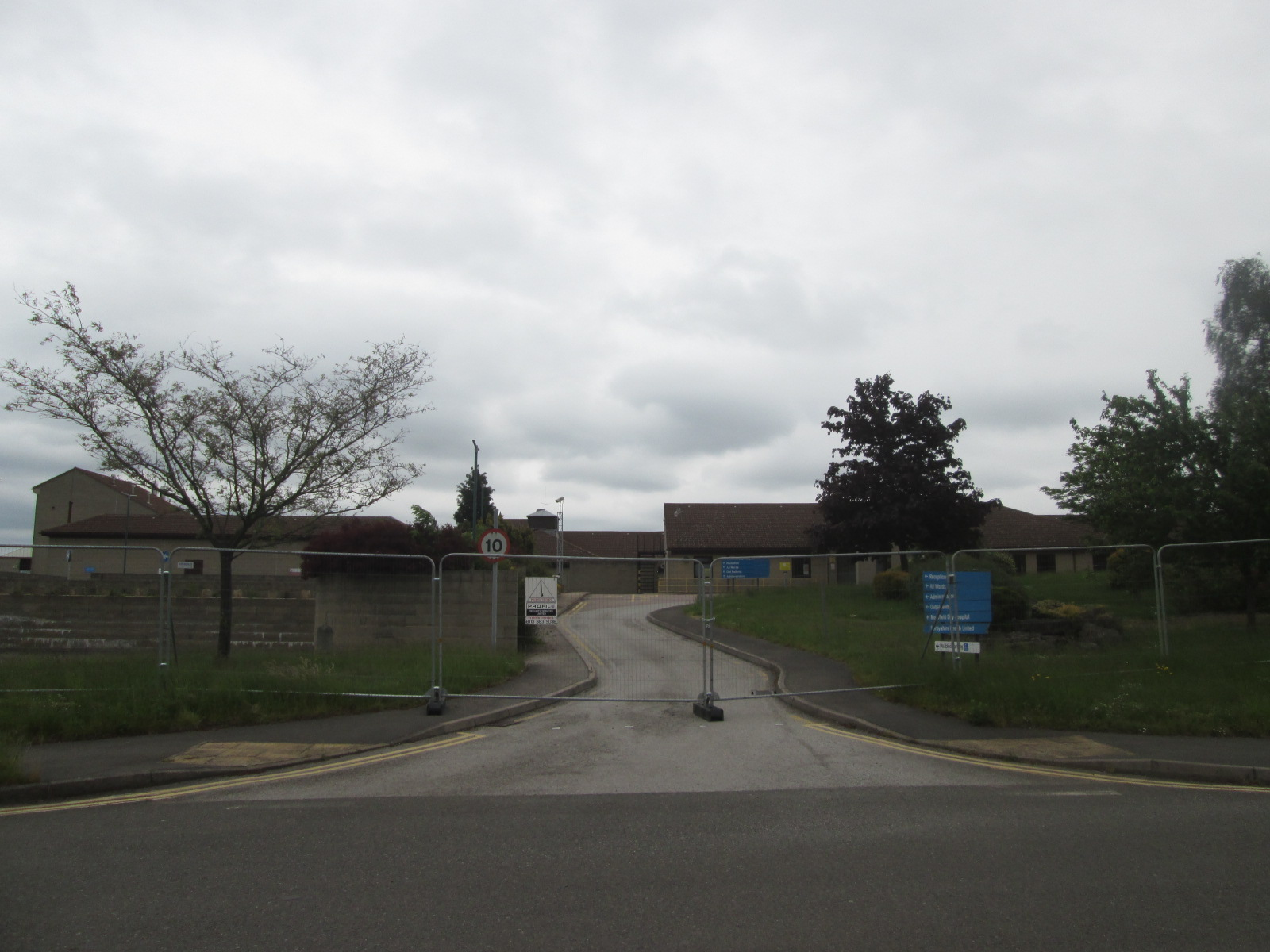
- Bolsover Hospital

- Location in Derbyshire

Geography
- Location: Welbeck Road, Bolsover, Derbyshire, England
- Coordinates: 53.2326°N 1.2795°W

Organisation
- Care system: NHS
- Type: Community

History
- Founded: 1988
- Closed: 2019

Links
- Website: www.dchs.nhs.uk

Bolsover Hospital was a community healthcare facility in Bolsover, Derbyshire. It was managed by Derbyshire Community Health Services NHS Foundation Trust.

== History ==
Bolsover Hospital was built as a small single-storey building and completed in 1988. Despite efforts by local member of parliament Dennis Skinner to challenge Prime Minister David Cameron in the House of Commons to prevent closure and a strong campaign against closure organised by local people, it was confirmed in July 2017 that the hospital would close. After services had been transferred to the Castle Street Medical Centre in Bolsover in early 2019, Bolsover Hospital closed and the site was handed over to Homes England to facilitate residential development.
