= Peter Neale =

English footballer (1934–2022)

Personal information
- Date of birth: 9 April 1934
- Place of birth: Bolsover, Derbyshire, England
- Date of death: 4 June 2022 (aged 88)
- Position: Centre half

Youth career
- Chesterfield

Senior career*
Years	Team	Apps	(Gls)
1955–1959	Oldham Athletic	117	(28)
1959–1966	Scunthorpe United	226	(7)
1966–1968	Chesterfield	69	(4)
1968–1969	Scarborough		
Total		412	(39)
- * Club domestic league appearances and goals

Peter Neale (9 April 1934 – 4 June 2022) was an English footballer who played as a centre half in the Football League.

Neale was born on 9 April 1934 in Bolsover, Derbyshire, and played for Duckmanton Miners Welfare, Markham Sports and Mansfield Town as an amateur before joining Oldham Athletic in January 1953, turning professional in 1955 following National Service, and making 117 appearances and scoring 28 goals. Good performances for Oldham saw him move to Scunthorpe United for a transfer fee of £2,500 in October 1958, where he scored eight goals in 245 appearances in all competitions. In October 1966, after being transfer-listed, he moved to Chesterfield for a fee of £2,000. He was released by Chesterfield in 1968 and dropped into non-league football, later working as an insurance salesman, a bus driver and a driver for the NCB. Neale died in June 2022 aged 88.
