= Bolsover Cundy House =

17th-century house in Derbyshire, England

Coordinates: 53.2332°N 1.2954°W

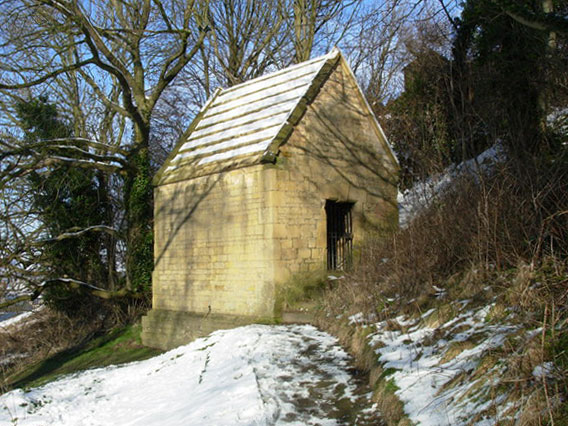
Bolsover Cundy House

Bolsover Cundy House is a restored 17th-century conduit house in Derbyshire, England, that was used to supply water to the nearby Bolsover Castle. It is near Houfton Road in Bolsover.

The plain rectangular building houses a brick water tank, which still collects water. It was built in the early 17th century and supplied water to the cistern house of Bolsover Castle until the 1920s. The roof is a solid stone vault to make it secure and impervious to decay, unlike timber. The structure was designated as Grade II* listed in 1989.

A scheme to restore the conduit house was carried out in 2002–2003 as part of a joint initiative between English Heritage, Bolsover Civic Society, and the local town and district councils. The aims of the project were to preserve the building, remove a safety hazard, and to raise the profile of this historic structure.

Bolsover Cundy House is in the care of English Heritage and managed by Bolsover Civic Society.
