= Carnfield Hall =

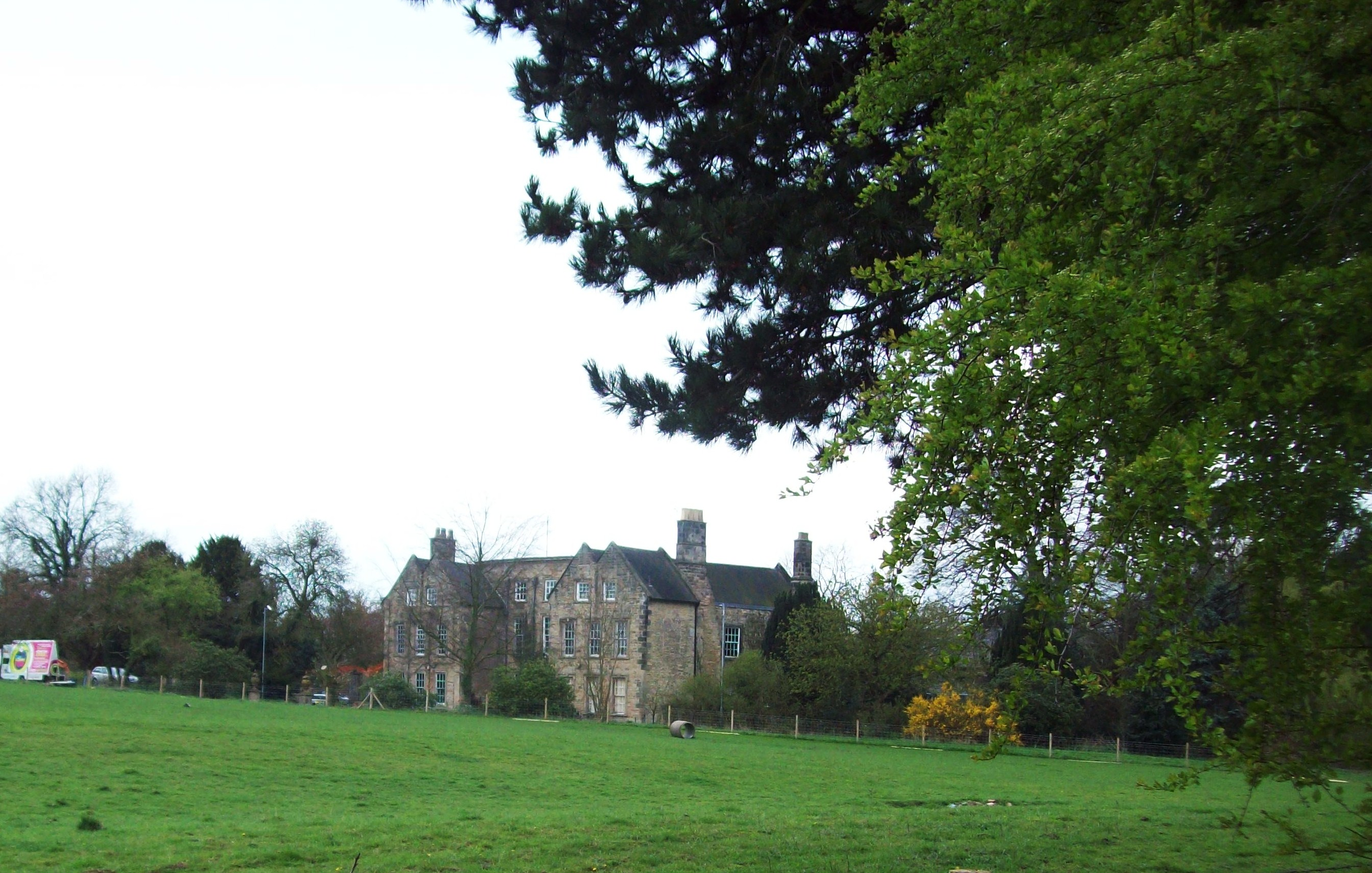
- Carnfield Hall

- Location within Derbyshire

General information
- Type: Country house
- Location: South Normanton, Derbyshire, England
- Coordinates: 53.0999°N 1.3657°W
- OS grid reference: SK4257056044
- Owner: Graham Oliver

Design and construction
- Designations: Grade II listed building

Website
- Carnfield Hall

Carnfield Hall is a privately owned country house located at South Normanton, near Alfreton in Derbyshire, England. It is a Grade II* listed building. The estate includes around ninety acres of park and ancient woodland.

The manor was anciently held by the Babington family of Dethick Manor, but was sold in about 1502 to Hugh Revell, a younger brother of John Revell of Ogston Hall.

Documents relating to the Carnfield estate date from the early 14th century. The earliest parts of the present structure date from the mid 15th century, but the west facing hall was extensively reconstructed in the 1560s by Edward Revell, son of Hugh.

Robert Revell, (High Sheriff of Derbyshire in 1700) substantially enlarged and improved the house in about 1710, when a new entrance front was created to the south with a three-storey, nine bayed, gabled facade. The Grade II listed coachhouse was also built at about this time.

Further reconstructions and additions were made to the hall throughout the 19th century. The architecture of Carnfield Hall is therefore a mix of Elizabethan, Jacobean and Victorian styles.

When Edward Revell died in 1770, the estate passed to his natural son Tristam Revell and on his death in 1797 to a cousin Sir John Eardley Wilmot. Subsequently, the hall had several owners including Joseph Wilson in 1834, Vaughan Radford, and Melville Watson, whose widow lived there until 1949 when it was sold to Noel Darbyshire.

Structural damage from mining subsidence caused Carnfield Hall to be abandoned in 1960, and it fell into decline. Despite an attempt to demolish the hall, and a plan to convert it into a hotel, Carnfield was eventually bought by antique dealer James Cartland in 1987. The hall has been extensively restored by Cartland in the intervening years, together with purchase of surrounding lands. Cartland sold the hall to Graham Oliver in 2011.

Today, Carnfield Hall is open to the public for guided tours of two people or more by appointment only. Various events such as plays, fairs and nature walks are held throughout the year. The hall and grounds are also hired out for private receptions and corporate events.

In March 2010, Carnfield Hall was the subject of a Channel 4 television programme presented by hotelier Ruth Watson as part of her Country House Rescue series.

== See also ==
- Grade II* listed buildings in Bolsover (district)
- Listed buildings in South Normanton
