= St John the Baptist's Church, Clowne =

St John the Baptist’s Church, Clowne
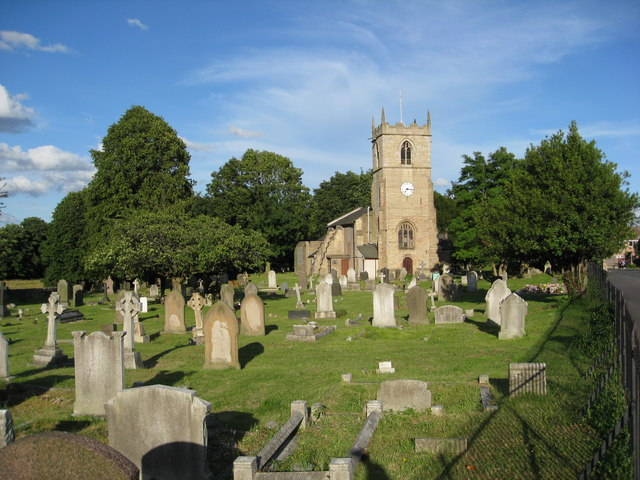
- St John the Baptist’s Church, Clowne

- Location within Derbyshire
- 53°16′20.47″N 1°15′15.33″W
- Location: Clowne, Derbyshire
- Country: England
- Denomination: Church of England

History
- Dedication: St John the Baptist

Architecture
- Heritage designation: Grade II* listed

Administration
- Diocese: Diocese of Derby
- Archdeaconry: Chesterfield
- Deanery: Bolsover & Staveley
- Parish: Clowne

St. John the Baptist's Church, Clowne, is a Grade II* listed Church of England parish church situated in Clowne, a village and civil parish in the Bolsover district of Derbyshire, England. The church, along with the medieval cross, is the oldest structure in the village.

== History ==
The parish church in Clowne was built in 1138. Originally dedicated as "All Saints", the church stood adjacent on the ridgeway route between Mansfield and Worksop Priory.

The church's dedication was soon changed to John the Baptist and the first rector was John M. Leyaster, who was recorded in 1299. Throughout the churches history there have been a total of 49 rectors.

The tower dates back to the 15th century with the bells added at various times with the first being installed in 1591, then 1616 and finally 1812.

During 1955 the church was extended to accommodate new choir stalls, sanctuary and organ. It was around this time that additional chapels were created on the side; these were used as a children's chapel and the other a miners chapel. The men who lost their lives in the Creswell Colliery Disaster in 1950 are remembered in this chapel.

The church also features stained glass windows and two paintings by Jean Baptiste Butatte, "The Ten Commandments" and "The Ascension". The Creswell Colliery disaster is also remembered on a stained glass window within the chapel.

== List of rectors ==
- 1343 - Simon de Lamleye
- 1353 - John de Austan
- 1355 - John de Wilford
- ? - John de Welton
- 1359 - Robert Ragunhull
- 1364 - William de Halughton
- 1375 - Herbert Crello
- 1376 - Richard Ronclyff
- 1393 - Thomas Hexi
- 1394 - William Dande
- 1418 - Roger Morton
- 1422 - William Swethyng
- 1423 - Thomas Alston
- 1426 - William Cawode
- 1427 - Richard Westhall
- 1445 - John Thorneton
- ? - John Marshall
- 1449 - John Porter
- 1456 - William Grene
- 1489 - John Powis
- ? - Peter Mandiville
- ? - Brian Burton
- 1528 - Robert Hewet
- 1530 - William Inskype
- 1625 - Robert Harrison
- 1650 - John Burton
- 1663 - Phineas Mace
- 1669 - George Chantrey
- 1721 - Henry Lea
- 1722 - William Portall
- 1730 - Thomas Donne
- 1739 - Samuel Yate
- 1789 - George Bossley
- 1822 - Joseph Wilton Pawsey
- 1833 - Robert Shepherd
- 1834 - Charles Walter White
- 1870 - Charles Leonard Helps
- 1900 - Joseph Waugh
- 1938 - Alan Bacchus Gordon
- 1951 - Frederick James Brabyn
- 1958 - William Sydney Wilcox
- 1971 - Lawrence Rex Rowland Harris
- 2005 - John Pinder-Packard
- 2011 - Stephen Timothy Short

== Organ ==
A specification of the organ can be found on the National Pipe Organ Register.

== Bells ==
The tower contains a ring of six bells dating from 1932 cast by Mears and Stainbank.

== See also ==
- Grade II* listed buildings in Bolsover (district)
- Listed buildings in Clowne
