= Listed buildings in Clowne =

Clowne is a civil parish in the Bolsover District of Derbyshire, England. The parish contains nine listed buildings that are recorded in the National Heritage List for England. Of these, two are listed at Grade II*, the middle of the three grades, and the others are at Grade II, the lowest grade. The parish contains the town of Clowne and the surrounding area. The listed buildings consist of houses and associated structures, the ruins of a former country house, a church, a market cross, and a war memorial.

== Key ==
Grade	Criteria
II*	Particularly important buildings of more than special interest
II	Buildings of national importance and special interest

== Buildings ==
Name and location	Photograph	Date	Notes	Grade
Church of St John the Baptist; 53.27230°N 1.25438°W		12th century	The church has been altered and extended through the centuries, and in 1954–55 the chancel was extended and a chapel added. It is built in limestone with slate roofs, and consists of a nave with a south porch, a chancel with a south chapel, and a west tower. The tower has two unequal stages, a chamfered plinth, diagonal buttresses, a west doorway with an almost round arch, above which is a three-light Perpendicular window, a chamfered string course, two-light bell openings, and an embattled parapet with corner crocketed pinnacles. The north wall is pebbledashed and supported by two large buttresses, and the south doorway is in Norman style.	II*
Clowne Cross; 53.27367°N 1.26445°W		14th century (probable)	The market cross stands in the middle of a road junction, and is in sandstone. The oldest parts are the base and the steps, with the upper parts dating from the late 17th century. It has three polygonal steps and a square base with broached and chamfered corners. On this is a circular column surmounted by a square cube acting as a sundial, and a ball finial.	II*
Ruins of Romiley Hall; 53.26844°N 1.29313°W	—	Early 17th century	The ruins of a small country house are in sandstone, and without a roof. There is now a single storey, and it contains a doorway with a chamfered surround, and the remains of mullioned and transomed windows.	II
Manor Farmhouse and barn 53.28037°N 1.25874°W	—	17th century	The farmhouse and barn are in limestone with sandstone dressings and quoins. The farmhouse has a tile roof, two storeys and four bays. On the front is a doorway with a lean-to porch, and the windows are a mix of sashes and casements, some with hood moulds. Recessed on the left is the barn, with a corrugated asbestos roof, two doorways, and mullioned windows.	II
Barn southeast of 106 High Street; 53.27283°N 1.26921°W	—	18th century	The barn is in limestone with sandstone dressings, and a pantile roof with the remains of coped gables and plain kneelers. There is a single storey, and the openings include a central cart entrance with a timber lintel and doorways.	II
106 High Street; 53.27303°N 1.26943°W	—	1758	A farmhouse in limestone with sandstone dressings, quoins, and a tile roof with coped gables and plain kneelers. There are two storeys and attics, and three bays. The doorway has a massive lintel and jambs, and to its left is a stair window. In the outer bays are two-light mullioned windows, and on the front of the house is an initialled datestone.	II
Southgate House; 53.28864°N 1.25420°W		Late 18th century	A small country house converted into a hotel, it is rendered, on a plinth, and has painted stone dressings, quoins, floor bands, and a hipped Welsh slate roof. There are three storeys and a symmetrical front of three bays, the middle bay projecting under a pediment. In the centre is a doorway with a round-arched fanlight and side lights, above it is a Venetian window, and in the top floor is a tripartite window, the middle light with a segmental head. The other windows are sashes with keystones.	II
Southgate Stables and wall 53.28913°N 1.25298°W	—	Mid 18th century	A pair of cottages, stables, and a coach house in sandstone with quoins, and Welsh slate roofs with coped gables and moulded kneelers. They have one and two storeys and form a U-shaped plan, with a central range and two projecting wings. In the central range is a square tower, with a doorway over which is a circular window, a blind rectangular window, and a pyramidal roof. To the right are two segmental-arched carriage entrances. The right wing has four bays and it contains the cottages. The courtyard is enclosed by a wall with rounded copings.	II
War memorial 53.27519°N 1.26301°W		c. 1920	The war memorial is in Portland stone, and consists of a life-size sculpture of a soldier in uniform. This stands on a tall tapering square pier with a moulded top, on a square base and a plinth. On the pier are the names of those lost in the two World Wars.	II
