= Whaley, Derbyshire =

Village in Derbyshire, England

Coordinates: 53.239°N 1.230°W

Whaley
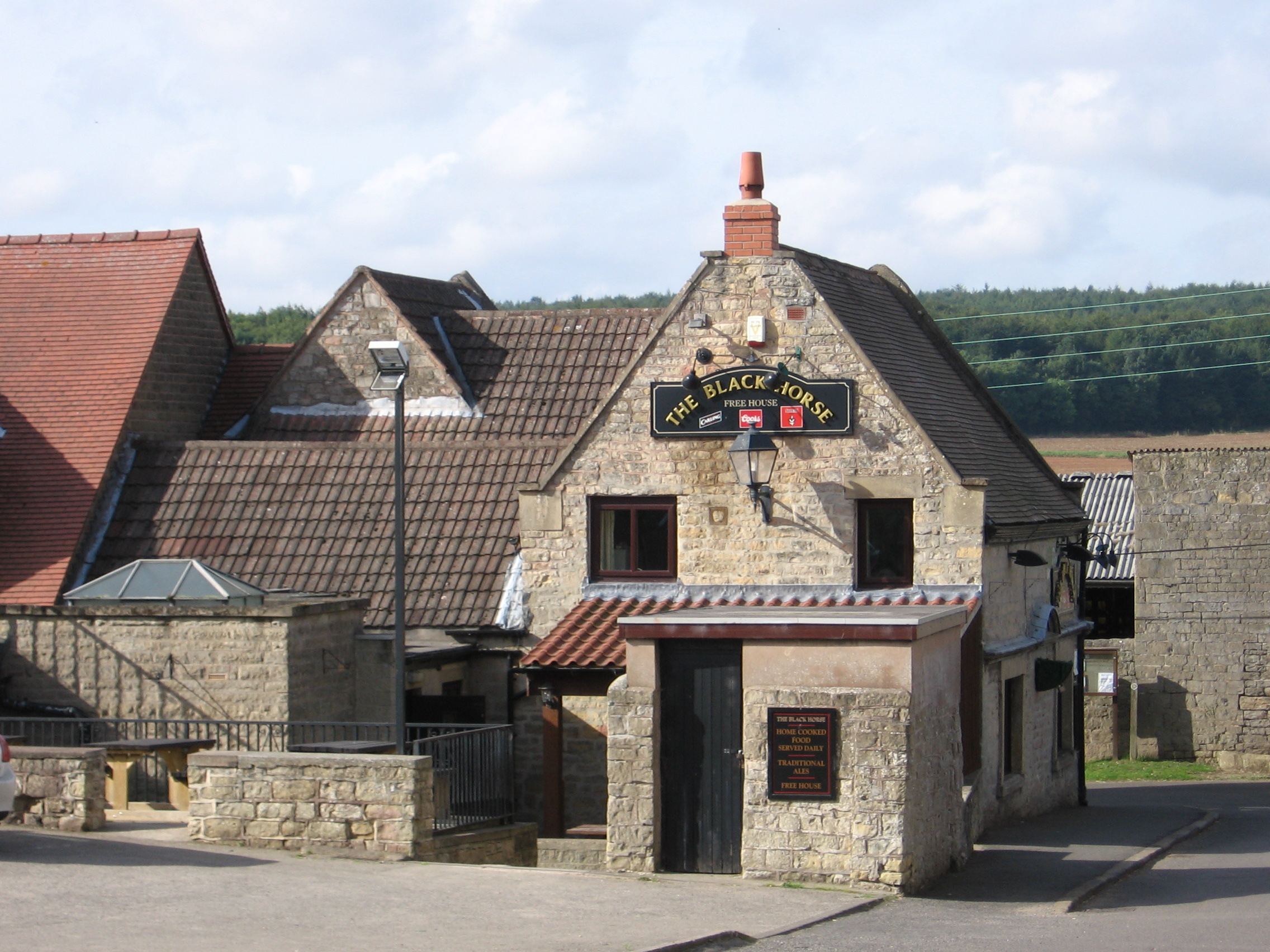
- Whaley - The Black Horse

- Location within Derbyshire
- OS grid reference: SK5171
- Civil parish: Old Bolsover
- District: Bolsover
- Shire county: Derbyshire
- Region: East Midlands
- Country: England
- Sovereign state: United Kingdom
- Post town: CHESTERFIELD
- Postcode district: S44
- Dialling code: 01246
- Police: Derbyshire
- Fire: Derbyshire
- Ambulance: East Midlands
- UK Parliament: Bolsover

Whaley is a village in the civil parish of Old Bolsover, in the Bolsover district, in Derbyshire, England, 2½ miles from Bolsover.

There are three pre-historic rock shelters behind the former school, on Magg Lane and opposite the pub, the Black Horse. These are linked to the Creswell Crags.

Scarcliffe Park, an area of woodland to the south end of the village, has Bronze Age and Roman remains. It is surrounded by a Pale ditch.

The village is a Conservation Area.

The Waterworks on Whaley Moor featured in Channel 4 series, Grand Designs.
