= Bolsover Colliery F.C. =

Bolsover Colliery
- Full name: Bolsover Colliery Football Club
- 1938–39: Yorkshire Football League, 17th

Bolsover Colliery Football Club was an English association football club based in Bolsover, Derbyshire. It competed in the FA Cup in the late 1940s.
