= Bolsover =

Town in Derbyshire, England

Coordinates: 53.2304°N 1.2875°W

- Town
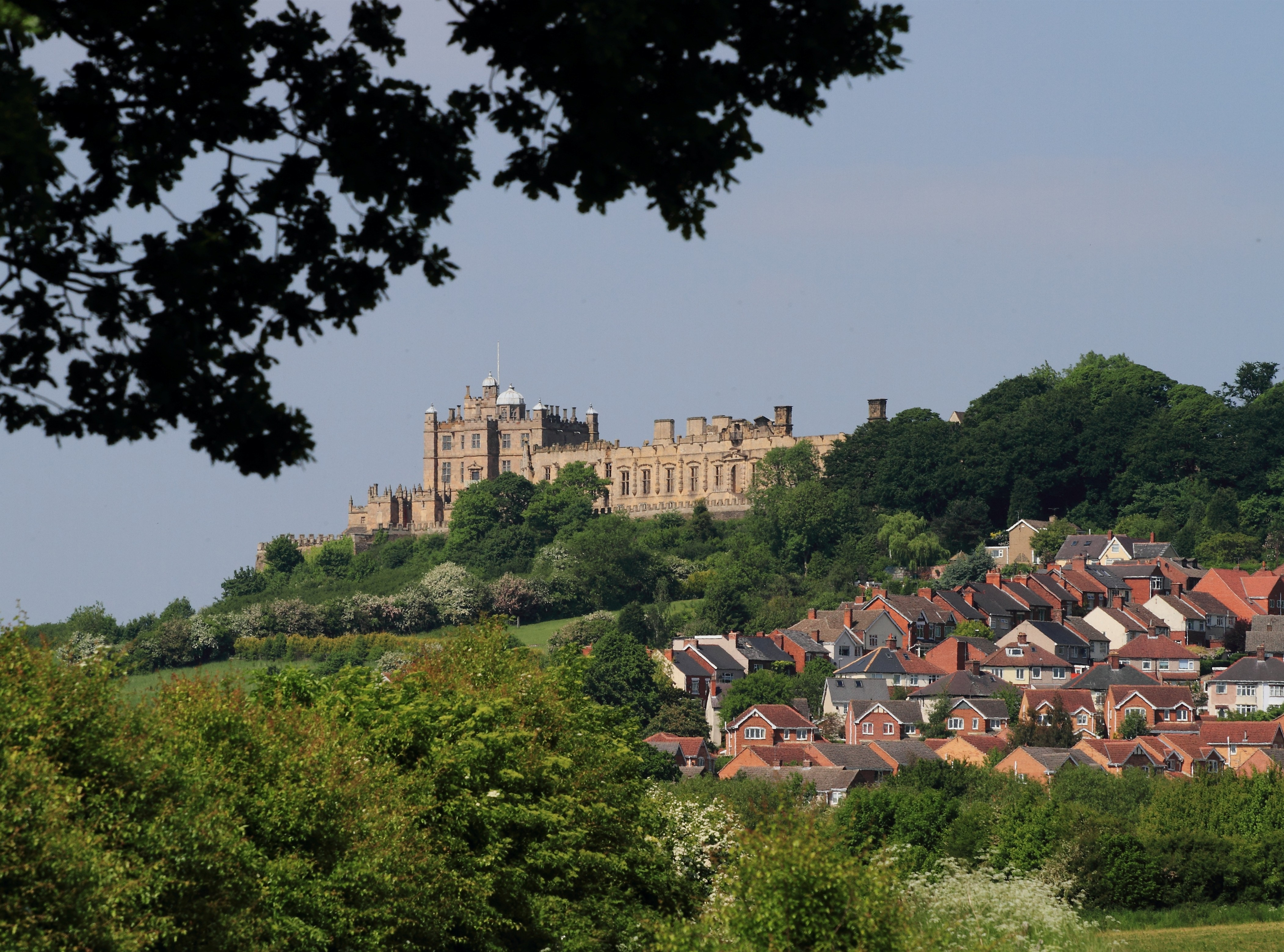
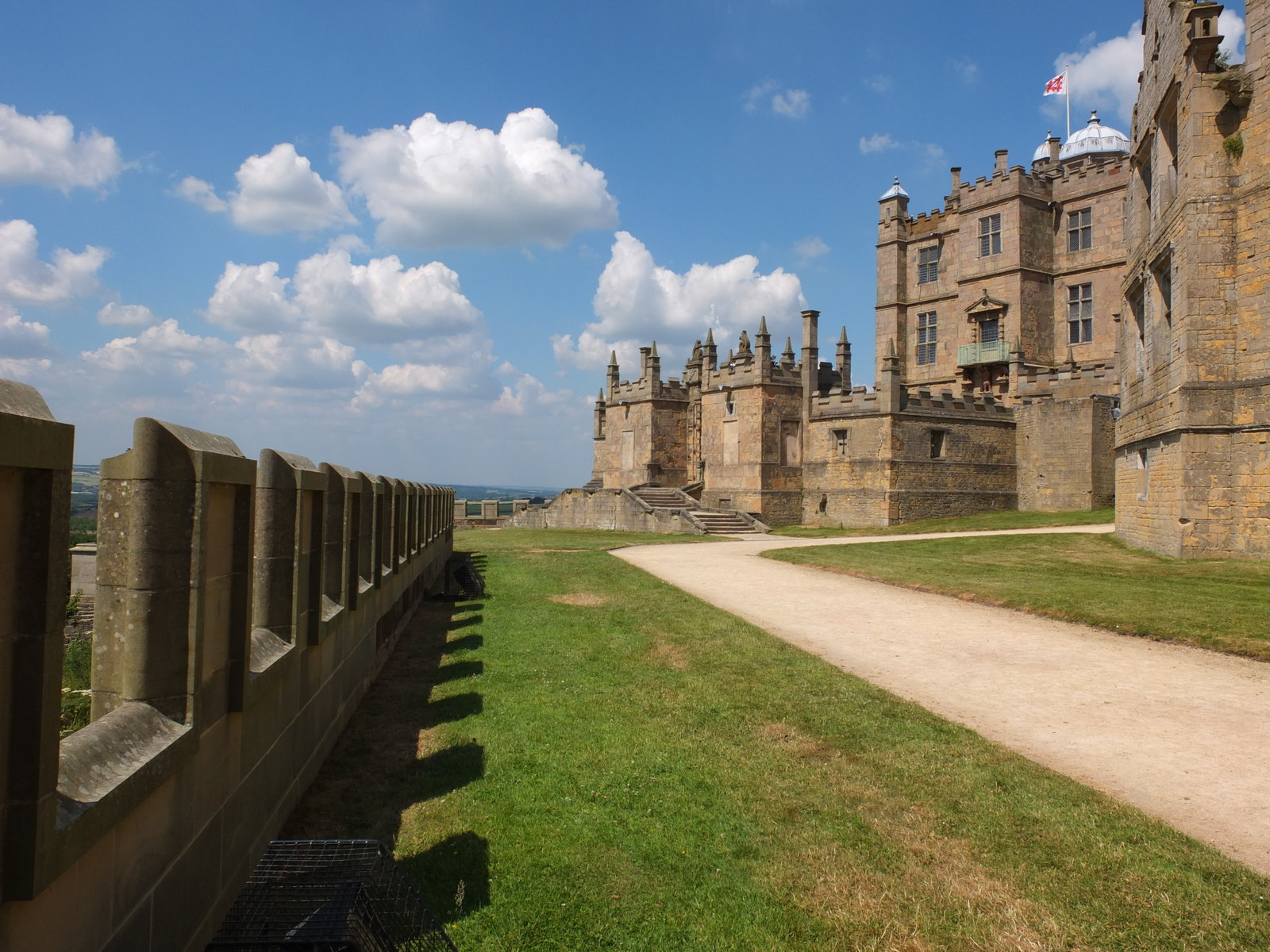
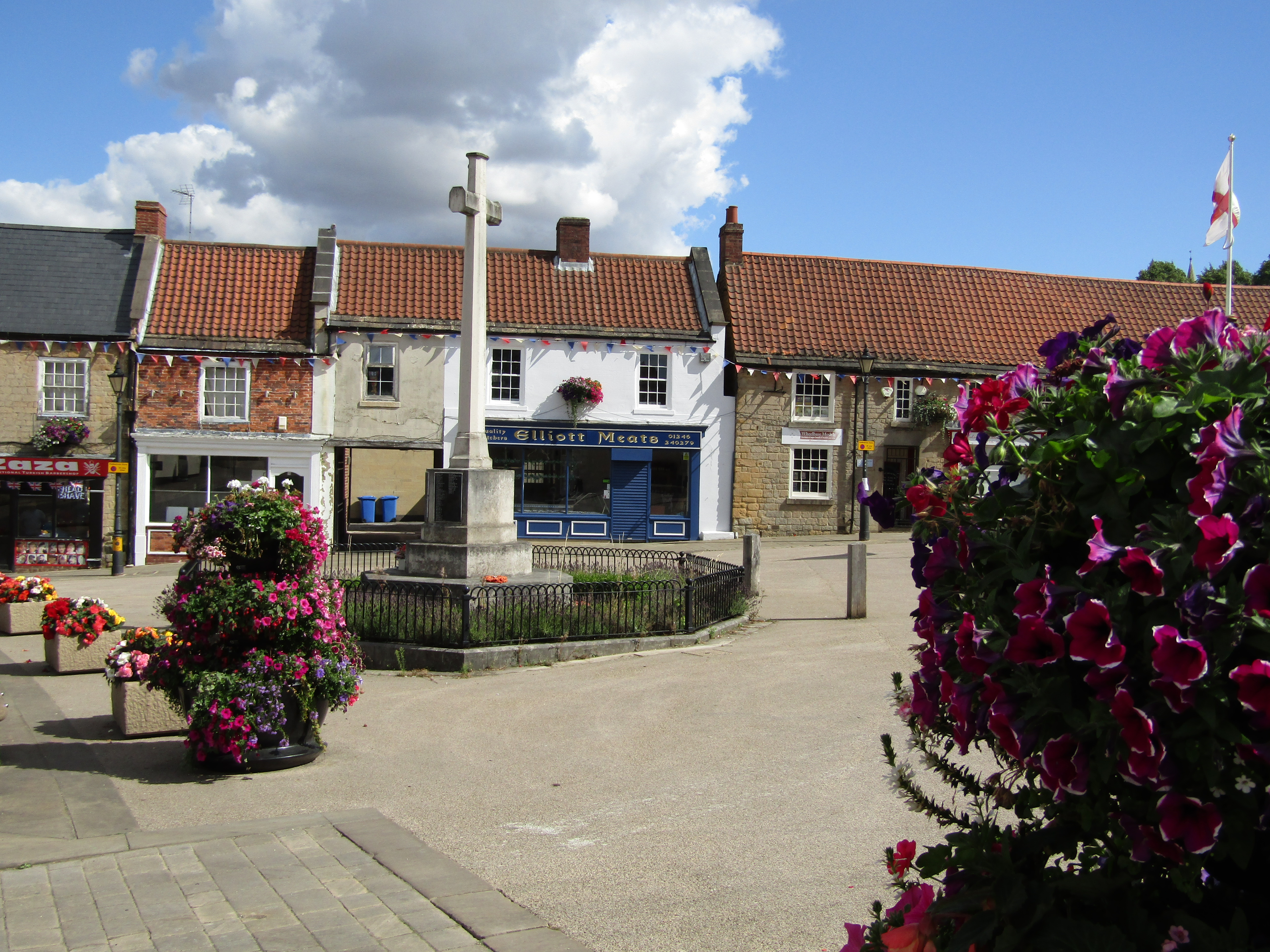
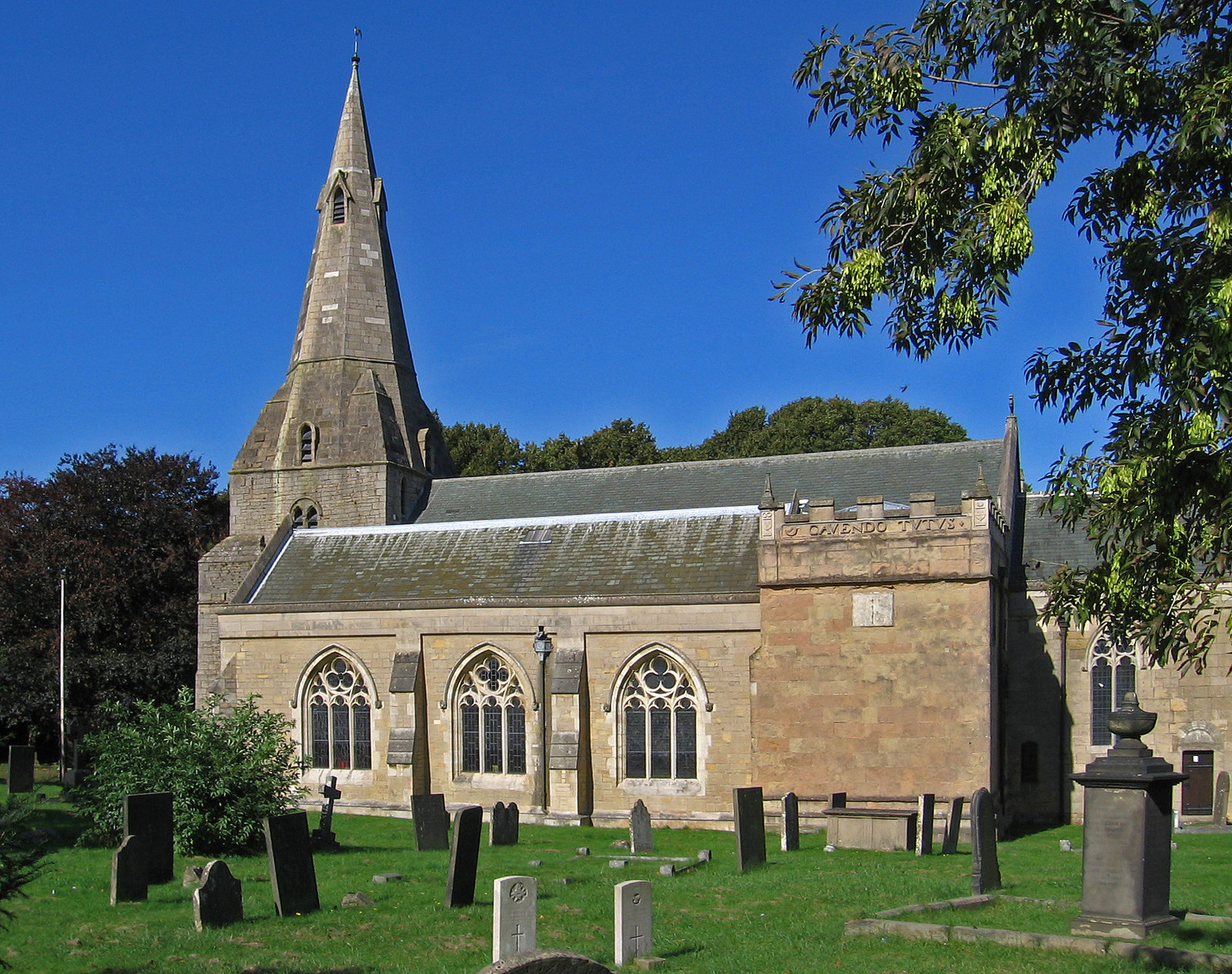
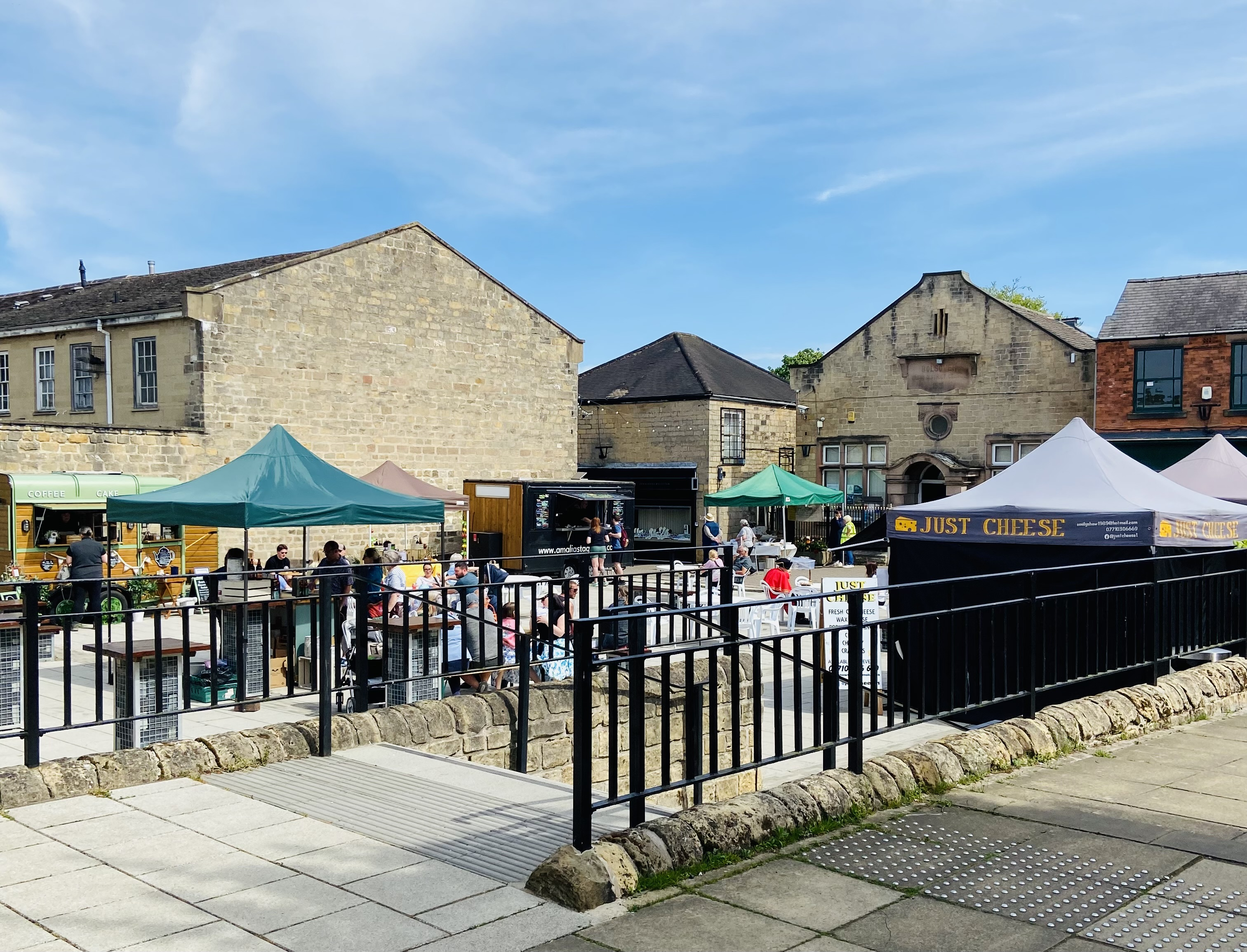
- The town and its castle Bolsover Castle Market Place St Mary’s Church Artisan Market

- Location within Derbyshire
- Population: 11,673 (civil parish)
- OS grid reference: SK475706
- Civil parish: Old Bolsover
- District: District of Bolsover
- Shire county: Derbyshire
- Region: East Midlands
- Country: England
- Sovereign state: United Kingdom
- Post town: CHESTERFIELD
- Postcode district: S44
- Dialling code: 01246
- Police: Derbyshire
- Fire: Derbyshire
- Ambulance: East Midlands
- UK Parliament: Bolsover

Bolsover is a market town and the administrative centre of the Bolsover district, in Derbyshire, England. It lies 18 miles (29 km) from Sheffield, 26 miles (42 km) from Nottingham and 27 miles (43 km) from Derby. Old Bolsover is the civil parish, including the town, the New Bolsover model village, Hillstown, Carr Vale, Shuttlewood, Stanfree, Oxcroft and Whaley. Its population at the 2011 UK Census was 11,673.

== Etymology ==
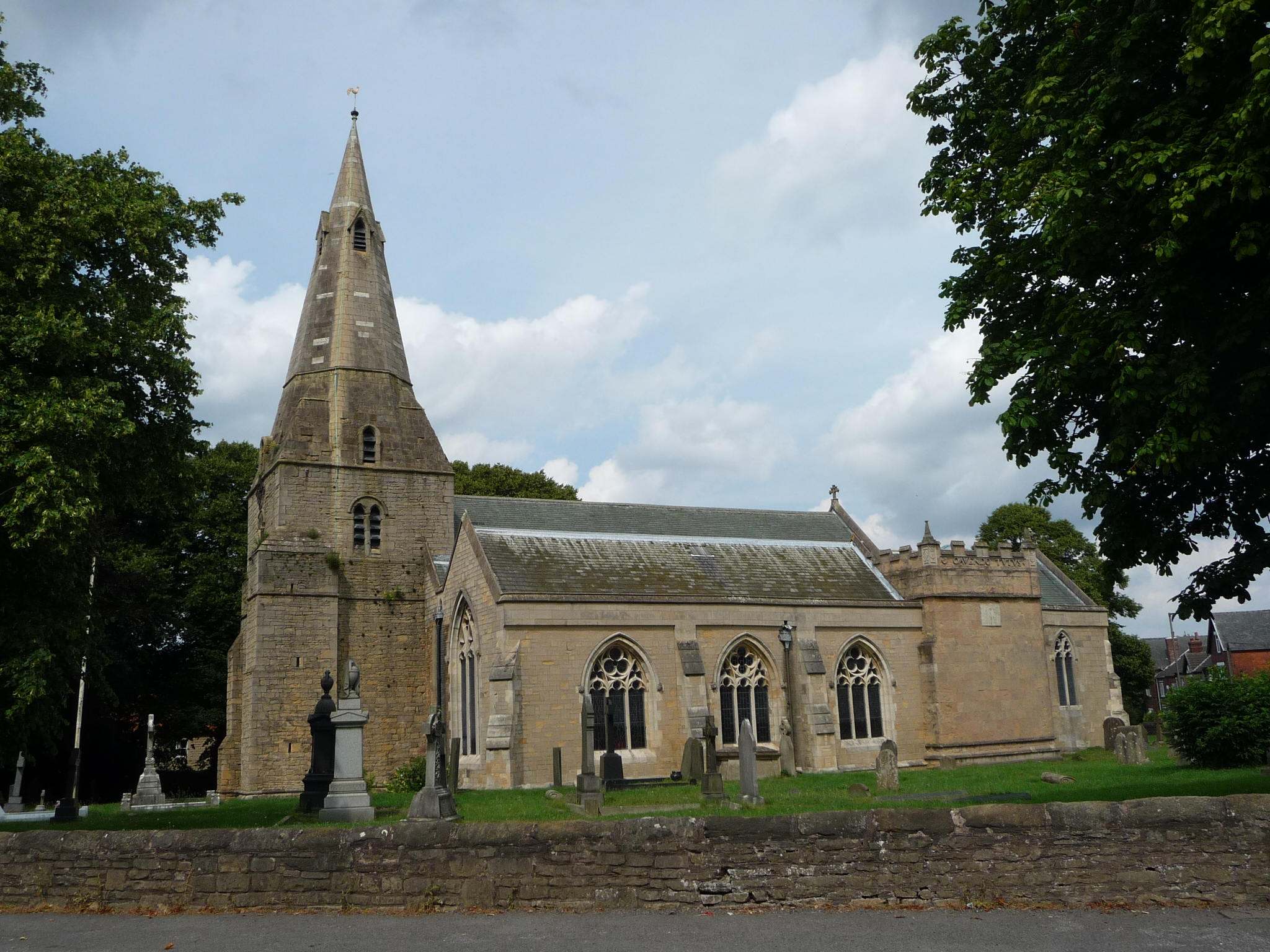
St Laurence Church

The origin of the name is uncertain. It may be derived from Bula's Ofer or Boll's Ofer, respectively the Old English for Bull's Ridge and Boll's Ridge (the ridge associated with a person named Boll); in the 1650s it was referred to as 'Bolsouer'.

== History ==
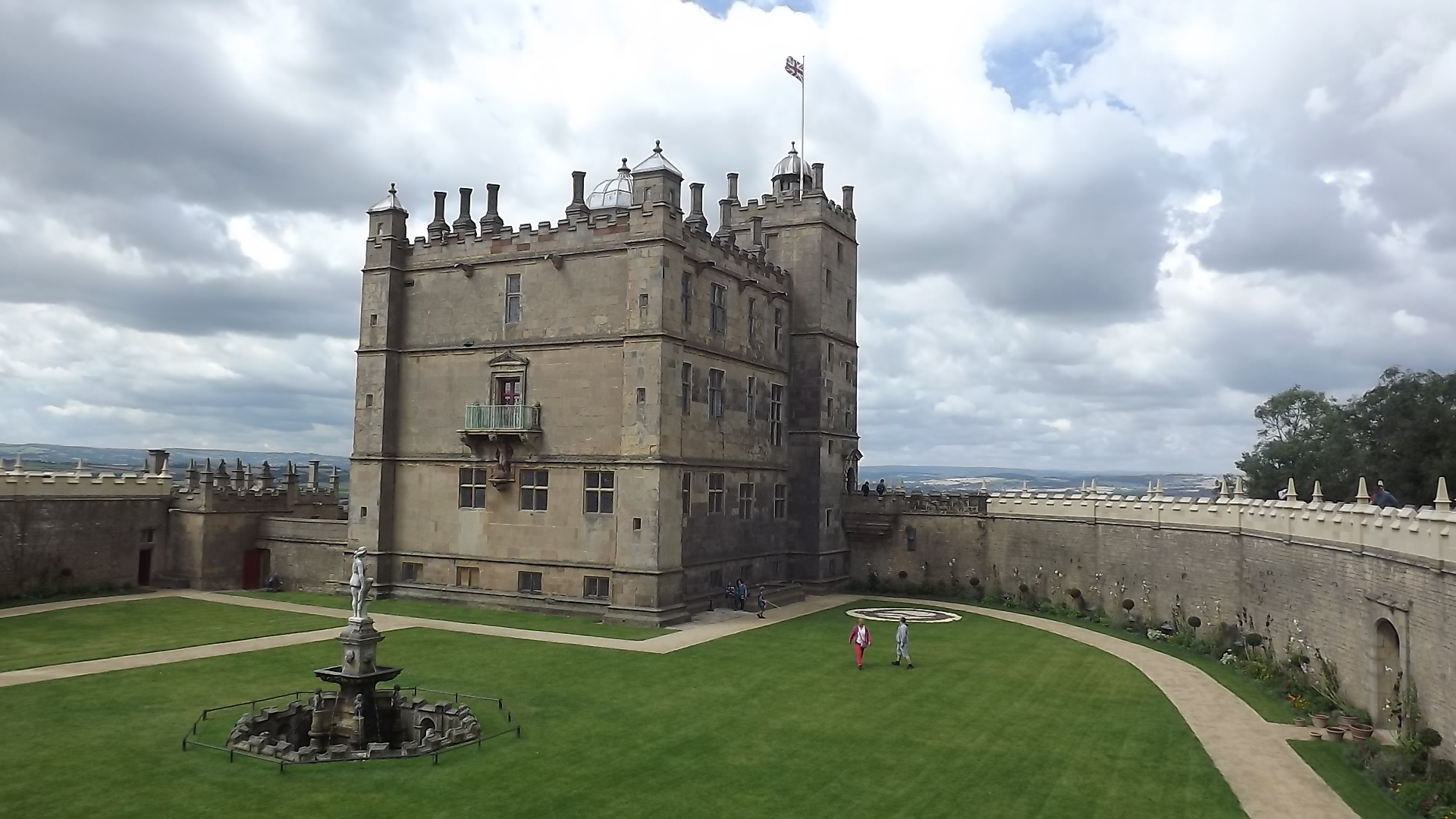
Bolsover Castle

Bolsover is mentioned in Domesday Book in 1086, named as Belesovre, where it is described as the property of William Peverel (or "Peveril"). The description refers to the villans, the ploughs, eight acres (32,000 m^{2})) of meadow and woodland pasture, which is given as two leagues by a league. Bolsover became the seat of the Peverel family and in the 12th century a keep was built. The present castle was erected in 1613.

In 1657, the leading Royalist William Cavendish, 1st Marquess of Newcastle, published his book La Methode et Invention nouvelle de dresser les Chevaux, written in exile in Antwerp during the Cromwellian Protectorate. This was translated in 1743 to A General System of Horsemanship in All its Branches. It covered the dressage of horses, at his 'Bolsouer', Welbeck Abbey, and Antwerp stables and contains engravings attributed to Abraham van Diepenbeeck showing Newcastle on a horse ('Monsieur le Marquis a Cheval') and views of his estates, including Bolsover.

The district of Bolsover is notable for three sites of historical importance:

- Bolsover Castle: an early-17th century castle, which lies on the earthworks and ruins of the 12th-century medieval castle
- Creswell Crags, home to Britain's only known Palaeolithic cave art
- Creswell Model Village, an example of early-20th century design from the model village movement.

St Mary and St Laurence's Church is a notable historic building. Bolsover also has a Methodist Church, part of the Derbyshire North East Methodist Circuit, which opened in 1896.

In chronostratigraphy, the British sub-stage (formerly 'stage') of the Carboniferous period, the 'Bolsovian' derives its name from a geological exposure at the River Doe Lea, Bolsover.

Bolsover Hospital was completed in 1988, but closed in spring 2019.

The town sought city status in the Platinum Jubilee Civic Honours, but the bid was unsuccessful.

=== Railways ===
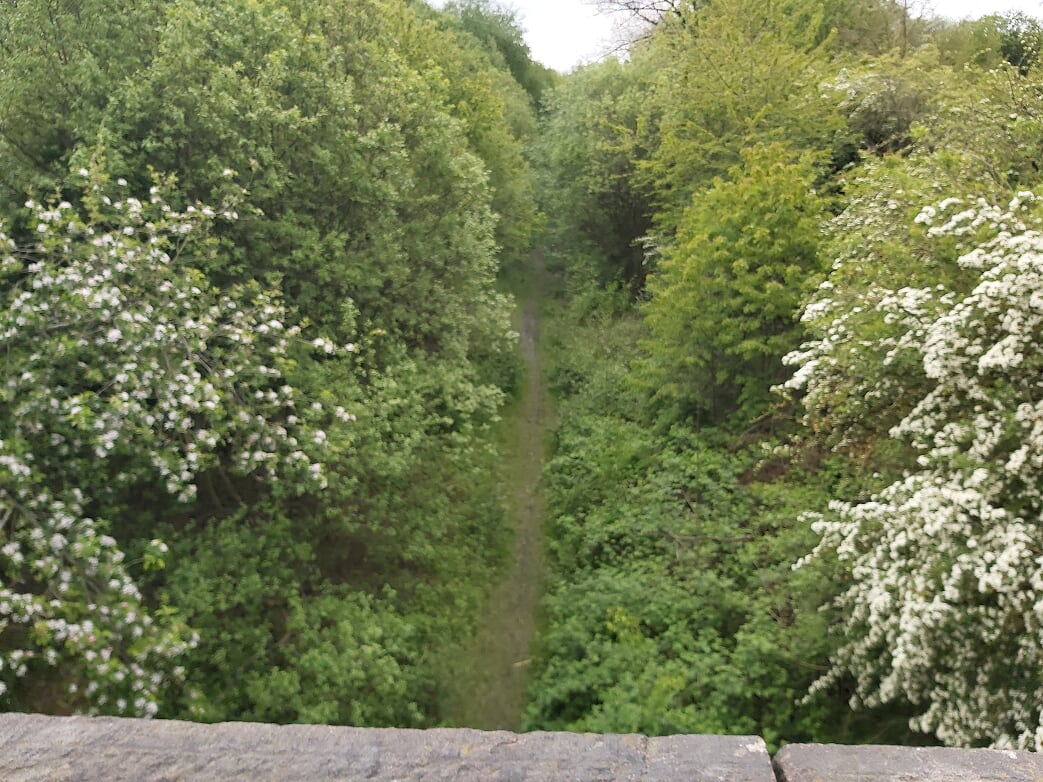
The site of Bolsover Castle station in 2021, formerly on the Doe Lea branch line

Two railway lines once served the town, but both were early casualties of closure programmes:

- The Midland Railway (later part of the London, Midland & Scottish Railway), arrived first with their north–south running Doe Lea branch line from Staveley Town to Pleasley East, opened in September 1890 and thus enabled a through service between Chesterfield and Mansfield to be operated. Bolsover Castle served the town on this line. Services were withdrawn in September 1930.
- The other line was the highly ambitious west–east running Lancashire, Derbyshire and East Coast Railway, later part of the Great Central Railway and subsequently the London & North Eastern Railway. Only the middle section from Chesterfield to Lincoln was ever built, opening in March 1897. Bolsover South served the town on this line. The section between Chesterfield and Shirebrook was brought to a premature demise in December 1951 by the deteriorating state of its biggest engineering feature, the 2,624 yards (2,399 m) Bolsover Tunnel, which ran beneath the limestone ridge on which stands the castle. The tunnel was mostly filled in with colliery waste in 1966–67 and both ends were sealed off. Today, both portals are visible; the eastern portal at the end of an unusually deep sheer-sided cutting in the village of Scarcliffe and the western portal just to the south east side of Bolsover.

== Economy ==
The major industry of the area was coal mining, but this has declined throughout Great Britain. The two main collieries closed in 1993:

- Bolsover Colliery, one of the five mines owned by the Bolsover Colliery Company closed on 7 May. It was an original member of the FT 30 list of companies.
- Markham Colliery, west of the town, closed on 2 July.

The other main employer was the Coalite and Chemical Company, which produced smokeless fuel and chemicals from coke and was founded in 1937; it moved its main headquarters from London to Bolsover in 1952. It was closed in 2004 after a decline in demand for solid fuel, which had left the company and its many subsidiaries deeply in debt. Its production of chemicals used to produce Agent Orange in the Vietnam War; its environmental impact on surrounding communities of Duckmanton, Shuttlewood, New Bolsover and Bolsover itself had rendered it a controversial company.

Another significant local employer was The Bolsover Hosiery Company Ltd, which was established in 1951 by Bolsover Urban District Council. The main factory site on Oxcroft Lane employed approximately 500 people at its peak in the late 1990s. It underwent a succession of takeovers, becoming part of Courtauld's Textiles; it was later taken over by the Sara Lee conglomerate and the factory was closed in 2000, with the loss of approximately 350 jobs.

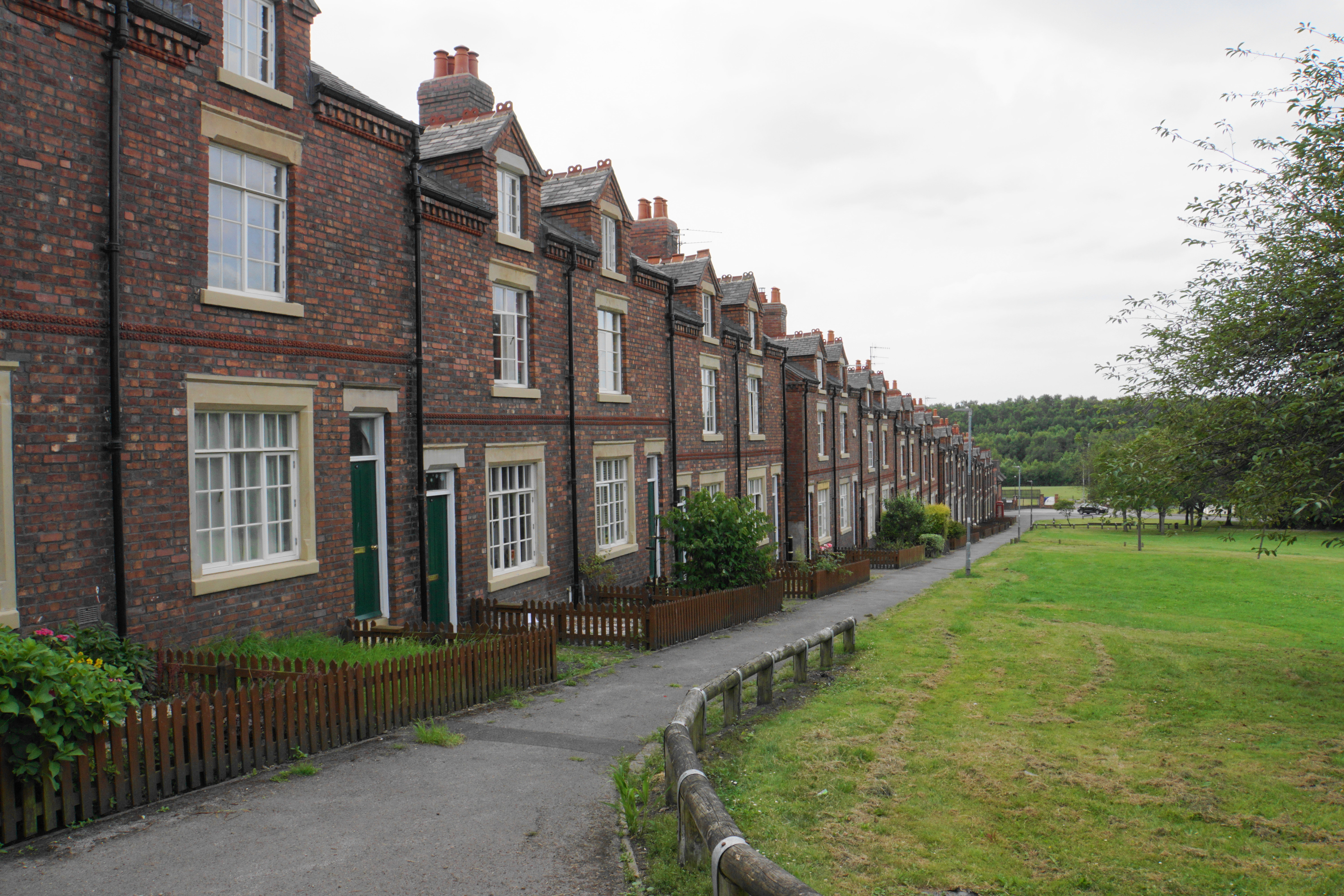
New Bolsover Model Village

The New Bolsover model village was built by the Bolsover Colliery Company to house its coal mining workforce. Funding was awarded by Bolsover District Council and the National Lottery to repair and restore the house.

== Governance ==
Bolsover has three levels of local government:

- the civil parish of Old Bolsover is administered by Old Bolsover Town Council
- the parish falls within the wider Bolsover District
- other functions are exercised by Derbyshire County Council.

The town lies within the Bolsover parliamentary constituency. Its MP from 1970 until 2019 was the Labour Party's Dennis Skinner, a former miner. The Conservatives' Mark Fletcher replaced him, with Natalie Fleet regaining the seat for Labour in 2024.

== Transport ==
The nearest National Rail station is Langwith-Whaley Thorns, 3 miles (5 km) away; East Midlands Railway provides regular services on the Robin Hood Line between Nottingham, Mansfield and Worksop. Inter-city services between Sheffield, Leicester and London St Pancras are available at Chesterfield, which is 6 miles (10 km) away.

Bus services are operated by Stagecoach East Midlands and Stagecoach Yorkshire; routes connect the town with Chesterfield, Mansfield and Sheffield.

== Media ==
Regional TV news is provided by BBC Yorkshire and ITV Yorkshire. Television signals are received from either the Emley Moor or Chesterfield TV transmitters. BBC East Midlands region is also the default BBC One variant through satellite television.

Local radio stations are BBC Radio Sheffield on 94.7 FM, Greatest Hits Radio North Derbyshire on 107.4 FM, Mansfield Radio on 103.2 FM and Elastic Radio, a community-based radio station which broadcast online.

The Derbyshire Times is the weekly local newspaper that serves the town.

== Sport ==
Bolsover Colliery F.C. used to play in the FA Cup. Current club F.C. Bolsover, founded in 2013, played in the Northern Counties East Football League for the 2018–2019 season.

== In popular culture ==
In 2007, Bolsover was chosen as the main location to shoot the film Summer starring Robert Carlyle and Rachael Blake. Many scenes from the film were filmed on the Castle Estate, which is affectionately known by Bolsover's residents as "the Wimps" because it was built by George Wimpey, the construction company, in the 1950s. Other parts of the film were filmed in Whitwell, Bramley Vale and Shirebrook Community school, just a few miles from the town. The film was released on 5 December 2008.

== Notable people ==
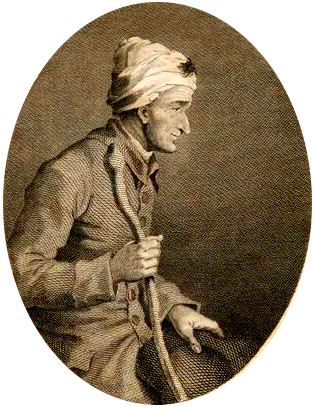
Jedediah Buxton, 1825

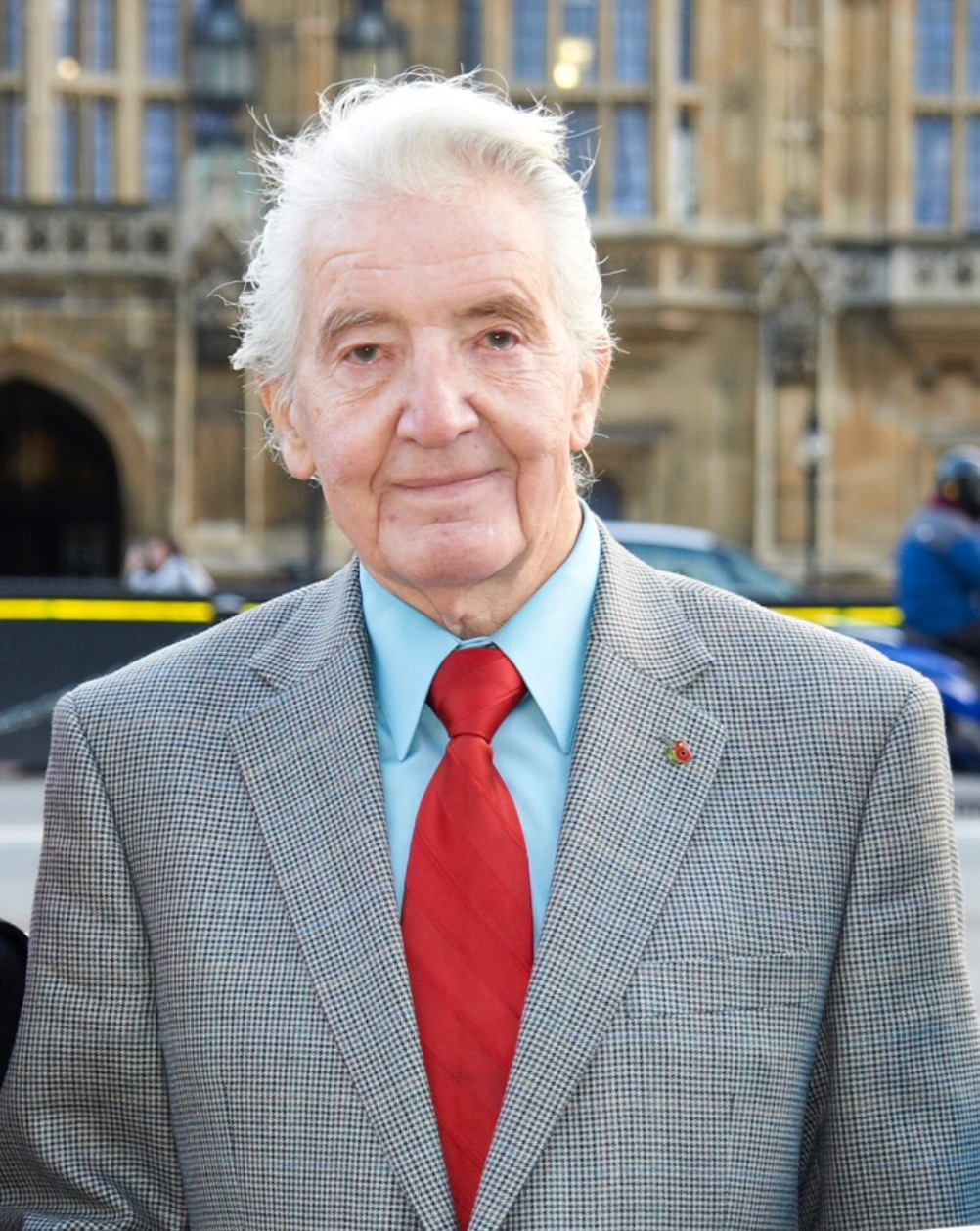
Dennis Skinner, 2016

- Jedediah Buxton (1707–1772), a noted mental calculator
- Abraham Booth (1734–1806), a dissenting minister and author, known as a Baptist apologetical writer.
- Peter Fidler (1769–1822), explorer, map-maker and surveyor with the Hudson's Bay Company
- Annie Seymour Pearson (1873–1956), a women's suffrage activist who ran a safe house for suffragettes evading police
- Elizabeth Caroline Gray (1800–1887), Scottish historian and travel author, lived in Bolsover Castle from 1829
- Dennis Skinner (born 1932), politician and MP for Bolsover between 1970 and 2019
- Mark Morris (born 1963), author known for his horror novels
- Steven Blakeley (born 1982), actor, played PC Geoff Younger in the British police TV drama Heartbeat
- Richard O'Dwyer (born 1988), computer programmer, creator of TVShack.net which the US felt infringed copyright.

=== Sport ===
- Tom Revill (1892–1979), cricketer and footballer, played 11 first-class cricket and 87 football matches
- Alf Saxby (1897–1979), footballer who played 186 games for Chesterfield
- George Clarke (1900–1977), footballer, who played 274 games for Crystal Palace
- Tommy Mitchell (1902–1996), first-class cricketer who played 328 games for Derbyshire and five Test cricket matches
- Stan Worthington (1905–1973), first-class cricketer who played 453 games for Derbyshire and nine Test cricket matches
- Joe Beresford (1906–1978), footballer, who played 224 games for Aston Villa.
- Charlie Elliott (1912–2004), first-class cricketer who played 275 games for Derbyshire
- Bill Leivers (born 1932), footballer and football manager, played 250 games for Manchester City
- Peter Neale (1934–2022), footballer who played 412 games including 226 for Scunthorpe United
- Brian Taylor (born 1954), footballer who played 119 games for Doncaster Rovers and 154 for Rochdale
- Ross McMillan (born 1987), rugby union hooker played 180 games.

== See also ==
- The Bolsover School
- List of places in Derbyshire
- Listed buildings in Old Bolsover
