= Shuttlewood =

Village in Derbyshire, England

Coordinates: 53.250°N 1.300°W

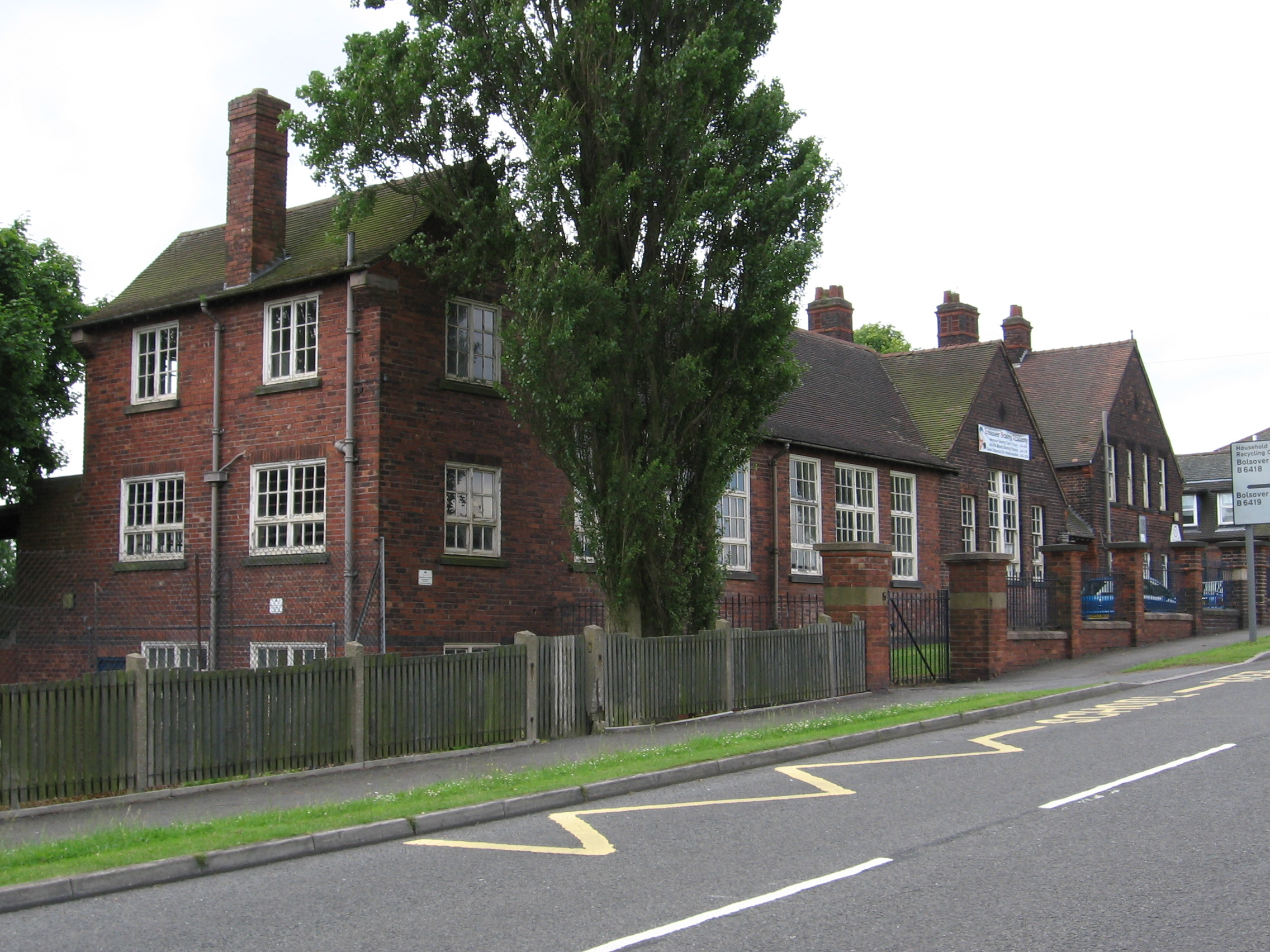
- Brockley Primary School, Shuttlewood

- Location within Derbyshire
- OS grid reference: SK4672
- Civil parish: Old Bolsover
- District: Bolsover
- Shire county: Derbyshire
- Region: East Midlands
- Country: England
- Sovereign state: United Kingdom
- Post town: CHESTERFIELD
- Postcode district: S44
- Dialling code: 01246
- Police: Derbyshire
- Fire: Derbyshire
- Ambulance: East Midlands
- UK Parliament: Bolsover

Shuttlewood is a village situated about 2 miles north of Bolsover, in Bolsover District, Derbyshire, England. It is centred on the crossroads of two main roads; Bolsover-Mastin Moor and Clowne-Chesterfield.

Shuttlewood is a former colliery village and thus has a lengthy mining heritage. It is a quiet village with a local shop and had a post office until June 2008.

== History ==
Population figures in 1846 mentioned 46 inhabitants. A map of Shuttlewood dated 1898 shows the Brick and Tile Yard situated on Woodthorpe Road, now in the vicinity of Woodthorpe Close, the Travellers Rest public house, the chapel and the school that was later in 1918 mentioned as St Laurence's Church.

By 1918, rapid expansion of Shuttlewood had taken place due to the mining industry and the Brockley School had been built. Also the football ground is shown behind the Travellers Rest on the side of Chesterfield Road. The terraced houses of Bentinck Road had also been built for miners who worked at the Oxcroft Colliery at Stanfree.

Shuttlewood is mentioned in Bagshaw's Directory of 1846 and mentions the spa that was situated on Mill Lane between Shuttlewood and Stanfree. It states, the water of Shuttlewood spa, is that of the same water as that of Harrogate but weaker; it has been used as a bath and bears marks of antiquity. The bath was not covered or even enclosed with a wall, the situation is rather convenient. However it must have assumed importance years ago because Shuttlewood became known as Shuttlewood spa. Until quite recently, it was used by people for miles around, who suffered from defective eyesight.

== Education ==
Brockley Primary School is a primary school that is run by Derbyshire County Council, It has a Foundation Unit for the younger pupils and then it provides education for pupils aged between 5 and 11 before they proceed towards secondary education at Netherthorpe School, Heritage High School or the Bolsover School. The head teacher is Mrs Caroline Rogers.

In 2005, a war memorial was unveiled at the school dedicated to the 25 men of both Shuttlewood and Stanfree (the neighbouring village) who gave their lives during the First and Second World Wars.

== Governance ==
Shuttlewood is in the civil parish of Old Bolsover, whose council is Old Bolsover Town Council.

== See also ==
- Listed buildings in Old Bolsover
