= USS Brennan =

Evarts-class destroyer escort

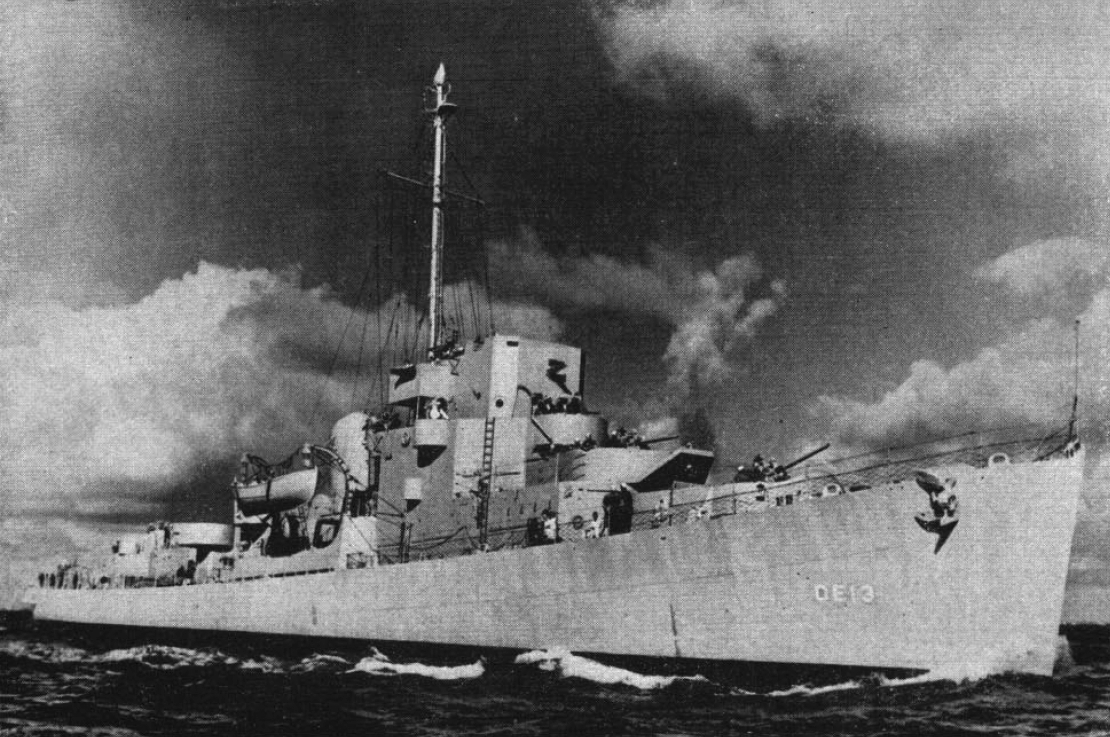
- USS Brennan (DE-13) in 1943

History

United States
- Name: USS Brennan
- Namesake: John Joseph Brennan
- Builder: Mare Island Navy Yard
- Laid down: 28 February 1942
- Launched: 22 August 1942 as HMS Bentinck (BDE-13)
- Commissioned: 20 January 1943 as USS Brennan (DE-13)
- Decommissioned: 9 October 1945
- Stricken: 24 October 1945
- Identification: DE-13
- Fate: Sold for scrap in 1946

General characteristics
- Class & type: Evarts-class destroyer escort
- Displacement: 1,140 (standard), 1,430 tons (full)
- Length: 283 ft 6 in (86.41 m) (waterline), 289 ft 5 in (88.21 m) (overall))
- Beam: 35 ft 2 in (10.72 m)
- Draft: 11 ft 0 in (3.35 m) (max)
- Propulsion: 4 General Motors Model 16-278A diesel engines with electric drive; 6000 shp; 2 screws
- Speed: 19 kn (35 km/h)
- Range: 4,150 nm
- Complement: 15 officers, 183 enlisted
- Armament: 3 × 3 in (76 mm) Mk 22 (1×3) dual purpose guns, 4 × 1.1 in/75 cal Mk 2 AA cannons (4×1), 9 × Oerlikon 20 mm Mk 4 AA cannons, 1 × Hedgehog Projector Mk 10 (144 rounds), 8 × Mk 6 depth charge projectors, 2 × Mk 9 depth charge tracks

USS Brennan (DE-13) was an Evarts-class destroyer escort constructed for the United States Navy during World War II and commissioned in January 1943. She performed anti-submarine and anti-aircraft convoy protection duties in North Atlantic Ocean waters, and was decommissioned in October 1945 at New York Navy Yard and scrapped in 1946.

== Design ==
The Evarts-class destroyer escorts were 289 ft 5 in (88.21 m) long overall, and they had a beam of 35 ft 2 in (10.72 m). They had an average draft of 10 ft 1 in (3.07 m) at their full load displacement of 1,416 long tons (1,439 t). Each ship had a normal crew numbered 156 officers and sailors.

Brennan was propelled by a pair of diesel motors manufactured by General Motors, which drove a pair of screw propellers. Her propulsion system was rated to produce 6,000 brake horsepower (4,500 kW) for a top speed of 19.5 knots (36.1 km/h; 22.4 mph). Oil storage amounted to between 131 and 197 long tons (133 and 200 t), which allowed a cruising radius of up to 6,000 nautical miles (11,000 km; 6,900 mi) at an economical pace of 10 knots (19 km/h; 12 mph).

The ship's armament consisted of a main battery of three 3-inch (76 mm) /50-caliber guns in individual pivot mounts, which could be used against air or surface targets. These were supported by a light anti-aircraft battery that initially consisted of four 1.1 in (28 mm) /75-caliber guns in a quadruple mount and nine 20 mm (0.79 in) Oerlikon guns. For attacks against submarines, the ship was equipped with a Hedgehog mortar, eight depth charge throwers, and two depth charge racks.

== Service history ==
Brennan was laid down on 28 February 1942 at the Mare Island Navy Yard as British destroyer escort Bentinck (BDE-13). She was launched on 22 August 1942 and reallocated to the United States early in January 1943. The ship was renamed Brennan on 6 January 1943, after John Brennan, a naval officer killed aboard the freighter Otho on 3 April 1942. She was commissioned on 20 January 1943.

Following shakedown training off southern California, Brennan arrived in Miami, Florida on 4 March, to serve as a training ship for student officers and prospective crews of destroyer escorts. She operated in the Florida Strait and in the West Indies for the remainder of her career, frequently touching at ports in Haiti, Jamaica, and Cuba. On 2 May Brennan collided with Gulfmaid in the Florida Strait, causing minor damage to both ships. The damage to Brennan's superstructure was repaired in July when she had an availability in Charleston, South Carolina.

On 15 September 1945 Brennan sailed to the New York Navy Yard to be prepared for inactivation. She was decommissioned there on 9 October, and her name was struck from the Navy list on 24 October 1945. She was sold for scrap in July 1946.

Brennan can be seen underway in Victory at Sea (Season 1, Episode 3 "Sealing the Breach" (1952).at 5:36 - 5:50/26:08 mins. “Brennan” is featured at the beginning of the World War 2 US Navy Training Film “Destroyer Escort.”

== Awards ==
- American Campaign Medal
- World War II Victory Medal
