= New Bolsover model village =

Coordinates: 53.228°N 1.304°W

New Bolsover Model Village
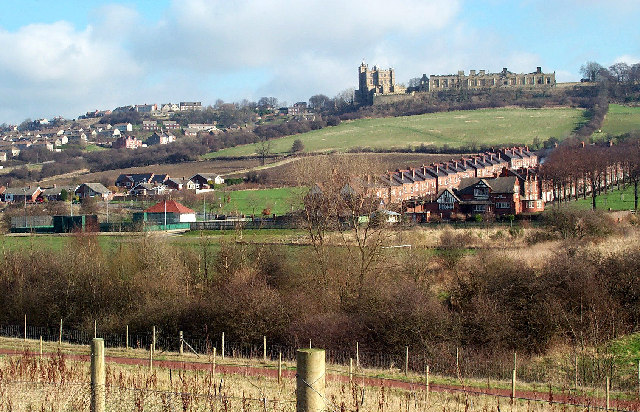
- New Bolsover Model Village and Bolsover Castle.

- Location within Derbyshire
- OS grid reference: SK465703
- District: Bolsover
- Shire county: Derbyshire
- Region: East Midlands
- Country: England
- Sovereign state: United Kingdom
- Post town: CHESTERFIELD
- Postcode district: S44
- Police: Derbyshire
- Fire: Derbyshire
- Ambulance: East Midlands

New Bolsover model village is a village adjoining the town of Bolsover in Derbyshire, England.

== History ==
The pit village was begun in 1891 by the Bolsover Mining Company. It is a model village built by philanthropic colliery owners which was to benefit and improve the lives of workers at Bolsover Colliery.

The architects for the village were Arthur Brewill and Basil Baily of Nottingham.

The village had a school and a Cooperative store. On the edge of the village were allotments, pig sties and the village cricket pitch. The village had no public houses, but there was an institute that would serve workers no more than three glasses of beer a day. The colliery company employed a policeman and anti-social behavior could result in fines or dismissal.

The "Model", as it is known locally, was completed in 1896 by the Bolsover Colliery Company. It had 200 houses for miners and colliery officials. A tram track round the back of the village linked it to the pit and coal was delivered directly from the colliery to the coal store behind each house. The contents of the ash privies were carried away. The "Model" remains in good repair. Its houses are either privately owned or owned by the local authority.

== Architecture ==
The village houses are built in a double horseshoe around a village green. Two-storey cottages with attics were built in terraces of eight in red brick with a decorative first floor band and saw tooth eaves cornices. Their Welsh slate roofs have decorative ridge cresting. Each house has three-light casement windows in ashlar surrounds and a doorway with ashlar lintels and an overlight. The first floors have two-light casement windows under chamfered ashlar lintels. Gabled dormers to the attics have two-light casements with small panel glazing. Similar two-storey cottages were built without dormers to their attics. All the houses have back yards enclosed by brick walls. The village houses are grade II listed buildings.

== See also ==
- Port Sunlight
- Bournville
- Creswell Model Village
- Woodlands, South Yorkshire
