= Stanfree =

Village in Derbyshire, England

Coordinates: 53.265°N 1.286°W

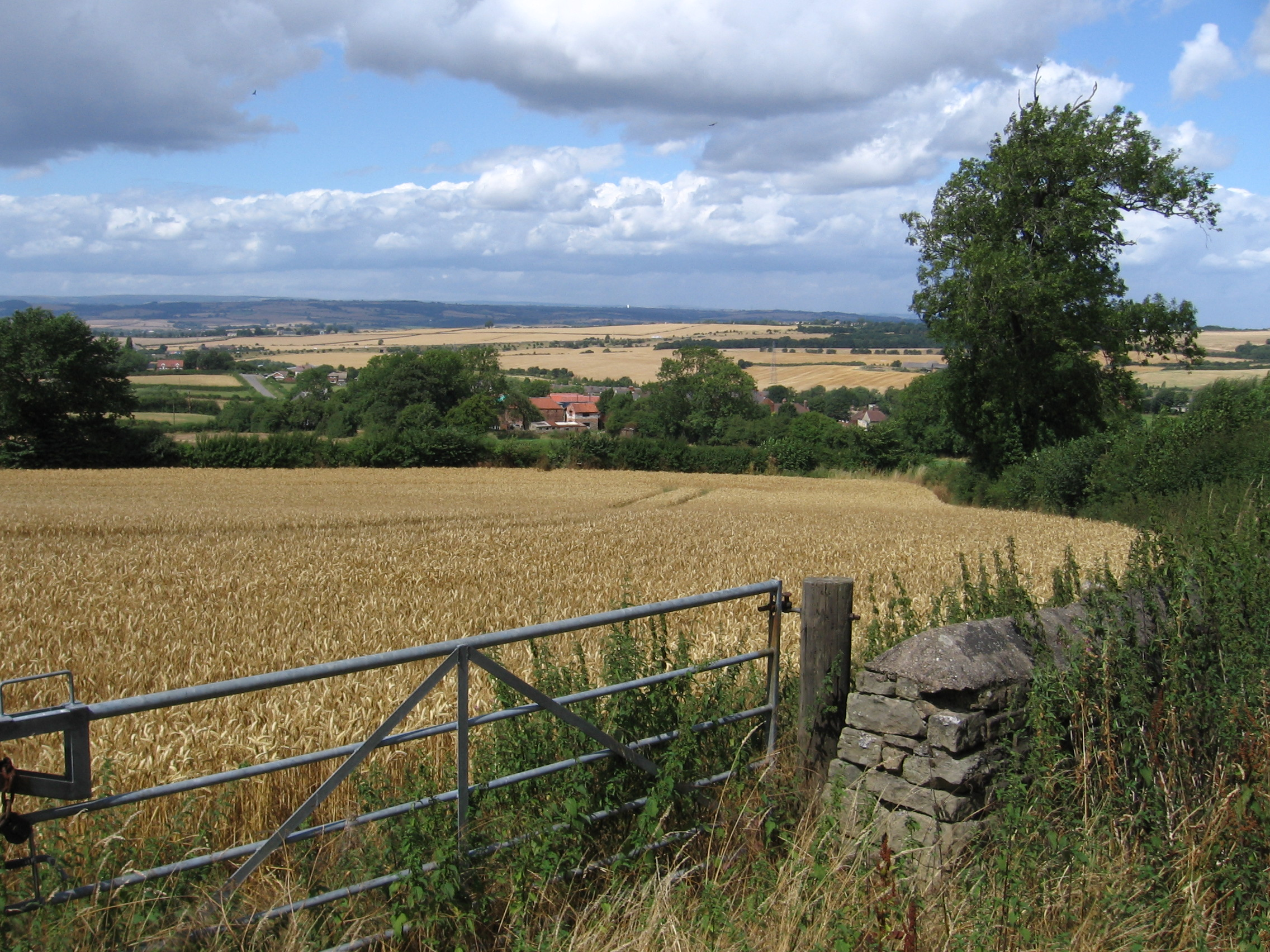
- Stanfree viewed from Oxcroft

- Location within Derbyshire
- OS grid reference: SK4774
- Civil parish: Old Bolsover
- District: Bolsover
- Shire county: Derbyshire
- Region: East Midlands
- Country: England
- Sovereign state: United Kingdom
- Post town: CHESTERFIELD
- Postcode district: S44
- Dialling code: 01246
- Police: Derbyshire
- Fire: Derbyshire
- Ambulance: East Midlands

Stanfree is a community/village in the Bolsover district of Derbyshire, consisting of a couple of rows of terraced cottages, lying halfway between Shuttlewood and Clowne. It is mentioned in Bagshaw's directory of 1846 and states "a hamlet about 2 and a quarter miles north from Bolsover market place". It is thought by some to draw its name from the fact that, though in a stoney neighbourhood, it is free from surface stone, or it may have a Roman or British origin. Iron seems to have been smelted here in primitive ages, and coal was worked some 500 years ago. Remains of the workings of both can be found. The four roads meeting here are said by tradition to have once been the main roads of England and Stanfree to have been a special meeting place. The local colliery that was a drift mine was closed in 1974. Only the Oxcroft Miners' Welfare, that was destroyed by fire in the late 1980s and rebuilt on the site of the cricket pavilion, is the lasting reminder that a colliery once stood there. The Appletree Inn on the corner of Appletree Road and Clowne Road closed in 2008.
