= Wensley, Derbyshire =

Village in Derbyshire, England

Coordinates: 53.146°N 1.608°W

Wensley
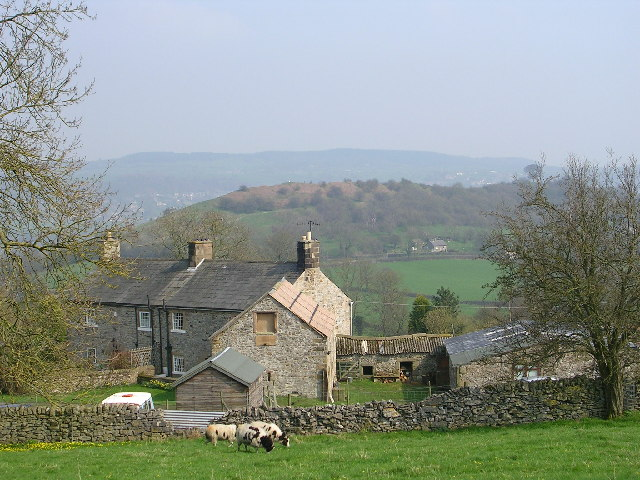
- Wensley

- Location within Derbyshire
- OS grid reference: SK263610
- District: Derbyshire Dales
- Shire county: Derbyshire
- Region: East Midlands
- Country: England
- Sovereign state: United Kingdom
- Post town: MATLOCK
- Postcode district: DE4
- Police: Derbyshire
- Fire: Derbyshire
- Ambulance: East Midlands

Wensley is a small village in South Darley parish in Derbyshire of limestone and gritstone properties mainly arranged along the single road which zig-zags through the village or around the square. The whole village, together with part of the adjacent Wensley Dale is a Conservation Area. Until fairly recently there was a Methodist Chapel, a village shop and two public houses, but these have all closed. The former school is now a village hall, Wensley Reading Room. Quite a few of the houses are holiday lets.

The parish church is St Mary the Virgin in the Cross Green area of Darley Bridge.

The nearest schools are South Darley Primary School, Winster Primary School, Elton Primary School and Darley Dale Primary School. Its nearest senior schools are Lady Manners School in Bakewell and Highfields School in Matlock, Derbyshire.

The 172 bus route of Hulleys of Baslow runs from Bakewell to Matlock, via Wensley, Darley Bridge and Darley Dale.

== History ==
The place-name of Wensley in Derbyshire is first attested in the Domesday Book of 1086, where it appears as ‘Wodnesleie’. It appears as ‘Wodneslega’ in the Pipe Rolls of 1167, and as ‘Wednesleg’ in the Book of Fees in 1212. The name means “grove or glade dedicated to Woden”.

The villagers in Wensley were employed in the lead mining industry in the fields around the village in the 18th and 19th centuries, after the London Lead Company obtained the mining rights in the 1720s.

== Notable residents ==
- Sir Thomas Wensley (or Wendesley) (d.1403) of Wensley, five times a Member of Parliament for Derbyshire, in 1382, 1384, 1386, 1390 and 1394. He was a follower of John of Gaunt, 1st Duke of Lancaster and was killed on 21 July 1403, fighting at the Battle of Shrewsbury for the Lancastrian cause. His effigy survives in All Saints' Church, Bakewell, Derbyshire.

== See also ==
- Listed buildings in South Darley
