= Oker, Derbyshire =

Hamlet in Derbyshire, England

Coordinates: 53.145°N 1.587°W

Oker
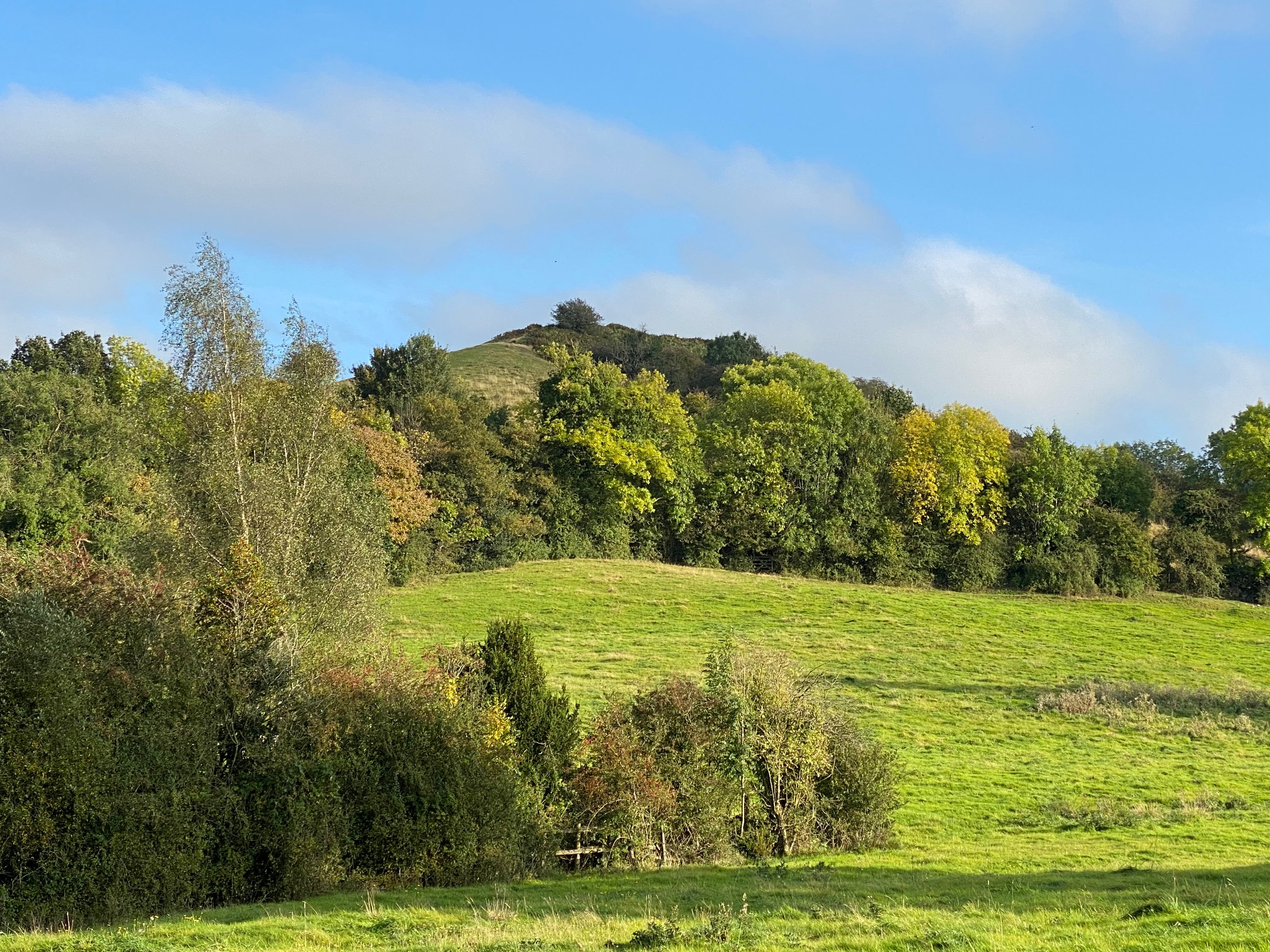
- Oker Hill

- Location within Derbyshire
- OS grid reference: SK277610
- Civil parish: South Darley
- District: Derbyshire Dales
- Shire county: Derbyshire
- Region: East Midlands
- Country: England
- Sovereign state: United Kingdom
- Post town: MATLOCK
- Dialling code: 01629
- Police: Derbyshire
- Fire: Derbyshire
- Ambulance: East Midlands

Oker (Oaker on some maps) is a hamlet in the civil parish of South Darley, in the Derbyshire Dales district, in Derbyshire, England, with groups of houses along two sides of Oker Hill. The houses are largely older limestone properties including several farms, but with some more recent semi-detached properties too. A former Methodist chapel has been converted to a holiday let.

A prominent tree, known as Will Shore’s Tree, on top of Oker Hill is renowned as the subject of a sonnet by William Wordsworth concerning two local lads who each planted a tree there before parting forever:

'Tis said that to the brow of yon fair hill
Two brother clomb; and turning face from face
Nor one look more exchanging, grief to still
Or feed, each planted on that lofty place
A chosen tree. Then eager to fulfil
Their courses, like two new-born rivers, they
In opposite directions urged their way
Down from the far-seen mount. No blast might kill
Or blight that fond memorial. The trees grew
And now entwine, their arms’ but ne’er again
Embraced those brothers upon earth’s wide plain,
Nor aught of mutual joy or sorrow knew
Until their spirits mingled in the sea
That to itself takes all – Eternity.

The parish church is St Mary the Virgin in the Cross Green area of Darley Bridge. The nearest school is South Darley Church of England Primary School, close to the church.
