= Snitterton Hall =

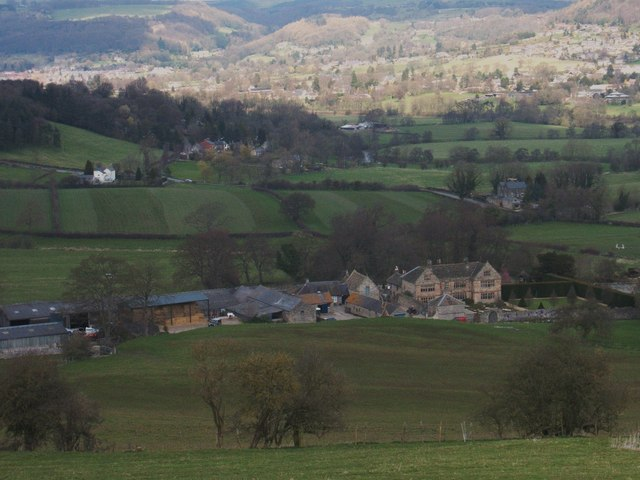
- Snitterton Hall from the south

- Location within Derbyshire

General information
- Architectural style: Elizabethan
- Location: Darley Dale, Derbyshire, United Kingdom
- Coordinates: 53.1395°N 1.5852°W
- Completed: 1633

Listed Building – Grade I
- Official name: Snitterton Hall
- Designated: 22 June 1950
- Reference no.: 1248141

Snitterton Hall is a late medieval manor house in Snitterton in South Darley parish, near Matlock, Derbyshire, England, and within the Peak District National Park. It is a Grade I listed building.

== History ==
Anciently an independent manor within the parish of Darley near Matlock, Snitterton Hall was held by a family of the same name whose emblem was a snipe (snite). It came to John Sacheverel of Morley upon his marriage to the de Snitterton heiress in the 14th century and a descendant was slain at the Battle of Bosworth Field in 1485. The estate was sold in 1596 by Henry Sacheverel, passing through the Shore and Smith families in the next 30 years before the house and half the original lands were acquired in 1631 by John Milward (then younger son of John Milward of Broadlowash) who became High Sheriff of Derbyshire in 1635 and who served as a colonel in the army of Charles I during the English Civil War.

In 1681 the house and its land passed to Felicia Milward and her husband Charles Adderley, a Warwickshire gentleman, who sold it in the succeeding decade to tax collector Henry Fearne of neighbouring Bonsall from whom it passed to his daughter and her husband Edmund Turnor of Stoke Rochford Hall, Lincolnshire. During the late 18th and early 19th century the Sybray family resided at the Hall. Leasing the land for farming. Before the estate was sold in 1910 to the Thornhills of nearby Stanton Hall. They began alterations to the Hall's north elevation which were left unfinished, and then sold on in 1936 to FE Bagshawe of Ford, Chapel en le Frith, who let it for 21 years and, on failing to sell once again in 1957, finally took up occupation of the house.

On Bagshawe's death in 1985 the Hall and its immediate demesne was bought by writer Adrian Woodhouse who began restoration of the house and its gardens after documentary research. In 1996 the house was bought by a Sheffield property developer, Paul Caplan, who undertook further work on the house and gardens until selling the property in 2008.

An enclosed underground swimming pool, planned and beginning construction in 2009–10, was completed in July 2012. At the time of pool construction the stone walls surrounding the property were reworked. These were close to destruction and were repaired; final work was estimated to be completed in November 2012.

== Architecture ==
The present house represents a refronting and extension c. 1632–33 of the earlier manor house. The recessed centre with a castellated parapet is flanked by single-bayed gabled cross wings. The windows are mullioned and transomed and the off centre entrance porch has Ionic columns beneath a unique frieze of four plants copied from woodcut illustrations in The Great Herball. Within the walled garden stands a single two-storey pyramid-roofed garden pavilion originally taller with castellation and one of a pair which flanked the surviving arched and castellated entrance gate into the enclosed front garden. To the north and east are gardens, and orchards which descend in terraces; a seating alcove within the north-west corner of the walls is aligned with a raised viewing platform further east.

To the north of the Hall are the remains of an angled fishing pond and fishing house which may be linked to Isaak Walton who was a Milward cousin and fellow Royalist. This, with a moated enclosure towards the north-east, either the site of an even earlier manor house or another landscape feature created by John Milward, has been designated as a Scheduled Monument.

== See also ==
- Grade I listed buildings in Derbyshire
- Listed buildings in South Darley
