= Snitterton =

Hamlet in Derbyshire, England

Coordinates: 53.1395°N 1.5852°W

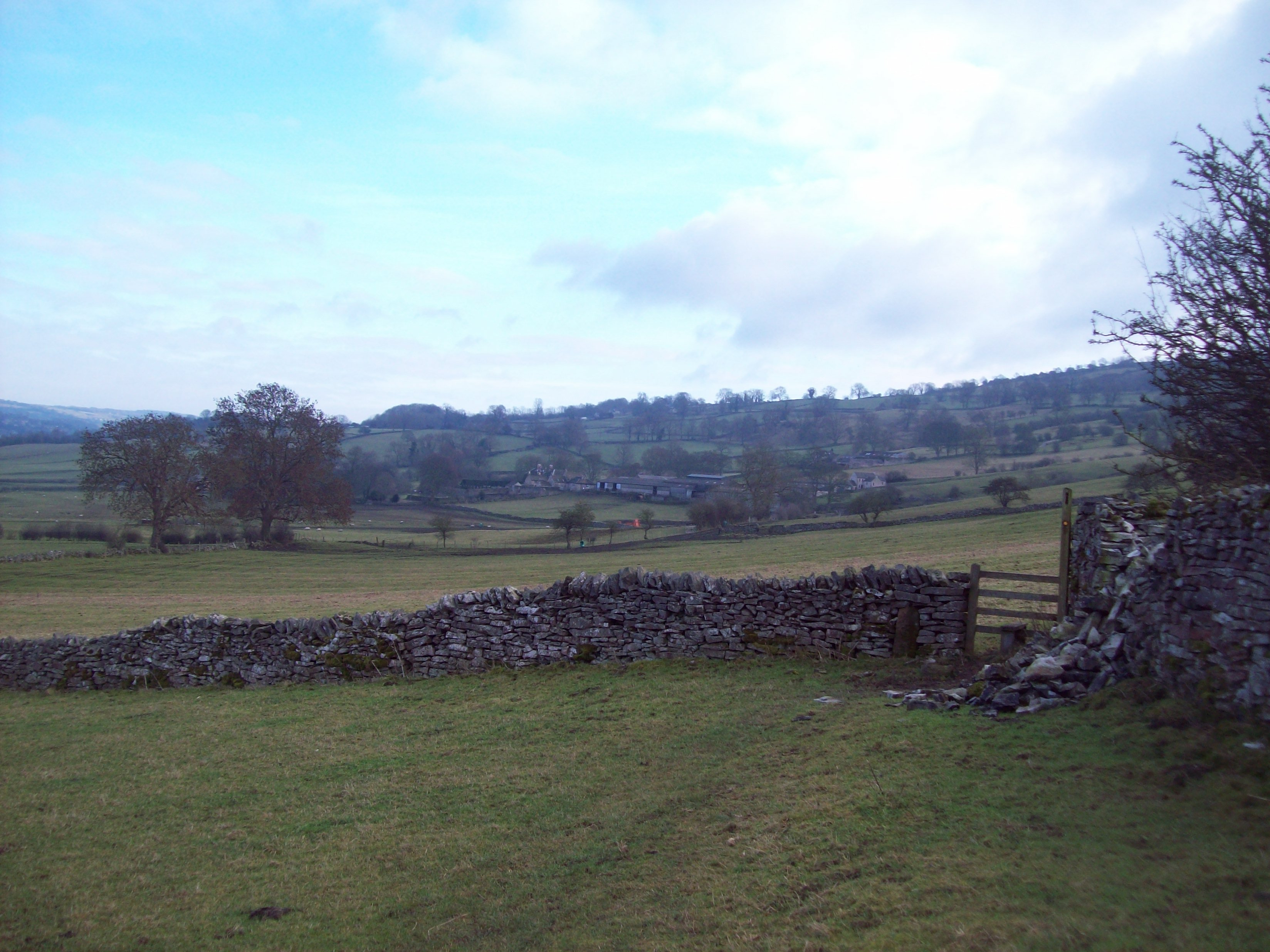
- Footpath approaching Snitterton

- Location within Derbyshire
- Civil parish: South Darley
- District: Derbyshire Dales
- Shire county: Derbyshire
- Region: East Midlands
- Country: England
- Sovereign state: United Kingdom
- Post town: MATLOCK
- Dialling code: 01629
- Police: Derbyshire
- Fire: Derbyshire
- Ambulance: East Midlands

Snitterton is a hamlet in Derbyshire, England, in South Darley parish, of some fifteen properties including two working farms and Snitterton Hall, a late 16th century manor house which is Grade I listed. There are signs that it was once a larger village.

In the centre of Snitterton is a square stone set in the ground with an iron ring; this is an 18th-century bullring, used to tether a bull for baiting with dogs.

The parish church is St Mary the Virgin in the Cross Green area of Darley Bridge, opposite South Darley Church of England Primary School.

== See also ==
- Listed buildings in South Darley
