= St Helen's Church, Darley Dale =

St Helen’s Church, Darley Dale
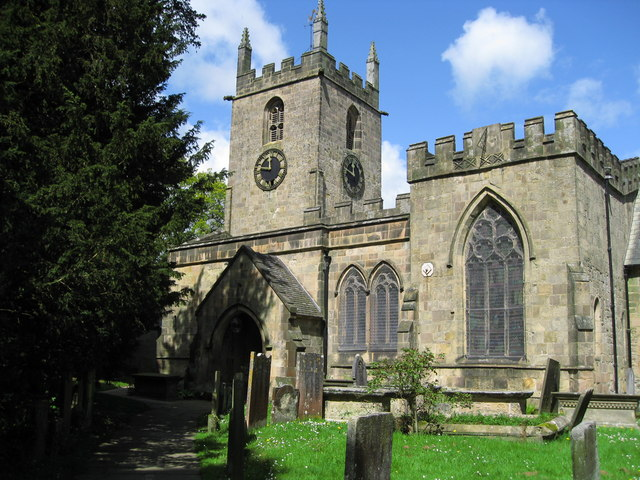
- St Helen’s Church, Darley Dale
- St Helen’s Church, Darley Dale
- 53°09′46.51″N 1°36′9.75″W
- Location: Darley Dale
- Country: England
- Denomination: Church of England

History
- Dedication: St Helen

Architecture
- Heritage designation: Grade II* listed

Administration
- Diocese: Diocese of Derby
- Archdeaconry: Chesterfield
- Deanery: Wirksworth
- Parish: Darley

St Helen's Church, Darley Dale is a Grade II* listed parish church in the Church of England in Darley Dale, Derbyshire.

== History ==
The church has elements of architecture from the Norman to the Perpendicular Gothic periods. It was restored and enlarged between 1854 and 1855 at a cost of £1,300 by Henry Isaac Stevens and was reopened on 24 April 1855.

The church was restored again in 1908 by the architect Percy Heylyn Currey.

== Parish status ==
The church is in a joint parish with:

- Mission Room, Over Hackney
- St Mary the Virgin's Church, South Darley
- St John the Baptist's Church, Winster

== Monuments ==
- Sir Joseph Whitworth (churchyard)

== Organ ==
The church contains a pipe organ by Brindley and Foster. A specification of the organ can be found on the National Pipe Organ Register.

== See also ==
- Grade II* listed buildings in Derbyshire Dales
- Listed buildings in Darley Dale
