= Winster Hall =

Historic stately home in Derbyshire, England

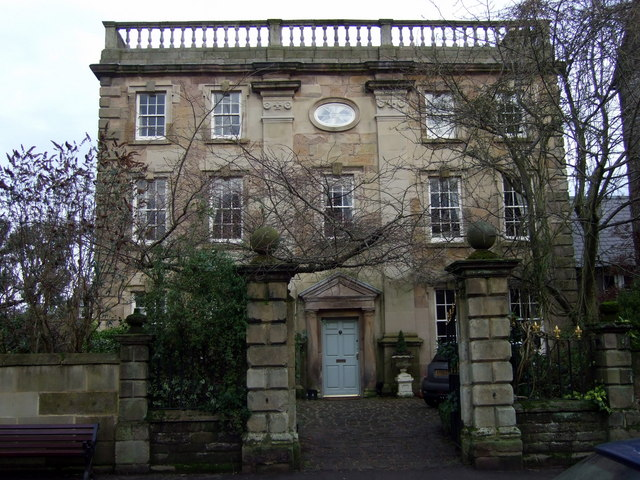
- Winster Hall

- Location within Derbyshire

General information
- Architectural style: Georgian
- Location: Main Street, Winster
- Coordinates: 53°8′32″N 1°38′22″W
- Ordnance Survey: SK2412060586
- Completed: 1629
- Client: Francis Moore

Design and construction
- Designations: Grade II* listed

Winster Hall is a Grade II* listed building in Winster, Derbyshire.

== History ==
The original hall was said to have been built between 1628 and 1629 for Francis Moore, a proprietor of several local lead mines. The stone used in the construction is said to have come from the Stancliffe quarries in Darley Dale, being transported on pack horses. The hall was rebuilt by the Moore family around 1720.

It passed by marriage to the D’Ewes Cokes, and then to the Maxwells, by whom it was sold in 1873 to John Joseph Briggs the naturalist.

Until the construction of the Vicarage, the hall was occupied by the various incumbents of Winster, notably, Revd. Shirley, Revd. Harvey, Revd. Dyke and Revd. George Mason.

Whilst in the ownership of John Joseph Briggs, it was occupied by Llewellynn Jewitt from 1867 to 1880, the eminent antiquary and archaeologist.

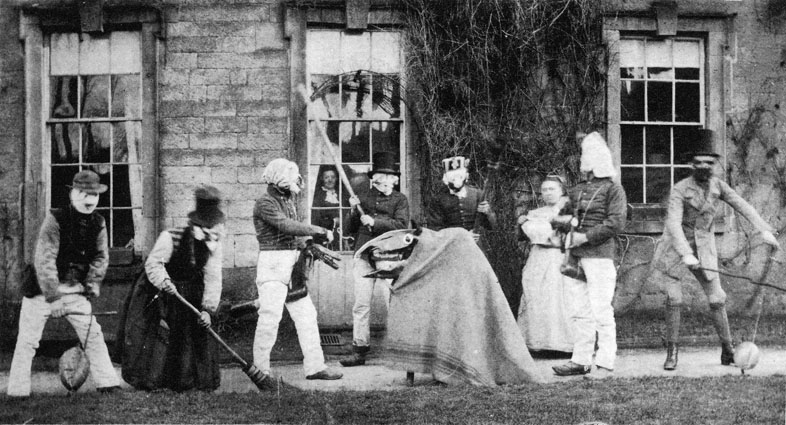
The three Winster hobby horses and other performers, c. 1870

The hall is noted as being the location of an early performance of a mummers play by the Winster Guisers from a photograph taken ca. 1870.

In 1880 the hall was sold to Messrs Heathcote Brothers, who converted it into a hydropathic institution. However, this business was not successful, and it was put up for sale in 1882. It was purchased by Captain Tom George Metcalfe in 1883 who owned it until his death in 1890. His widow lived there for a few more years and the hall was again up for sale in 1896.

It was lived in by William Marsland until 1903 and then his widow until 1926 when it was sold for £750 (equivalent to £39,600 in 2025) to Mr. Butler of Wingfield.

In the 1970s the hall became Winster Hall Hotel run by Derek and Pauline Wood, but this closed in 1999. It is now a private residence.

== See also ==
- Listed buildings in Winster
