= Nutation (disambiguation) =

Nutation is a rocking, swaying, or nodding motion in the axis of rotation of a largely axially symmetric object, such as a gyroscope or the Earth (see astronomical nutation). It may also refer to:

- In biology:
  - Nutation (botany), bending movements executed by some plant organs
  - In human anatomy, movement of the sacrum vis-a-vis the ilia
- The same as precession in spacecraft dynamics
- Nutation (engineering)
