= St John the Baptist's Church, Winster =

St John the Baptist’s Church, Winster
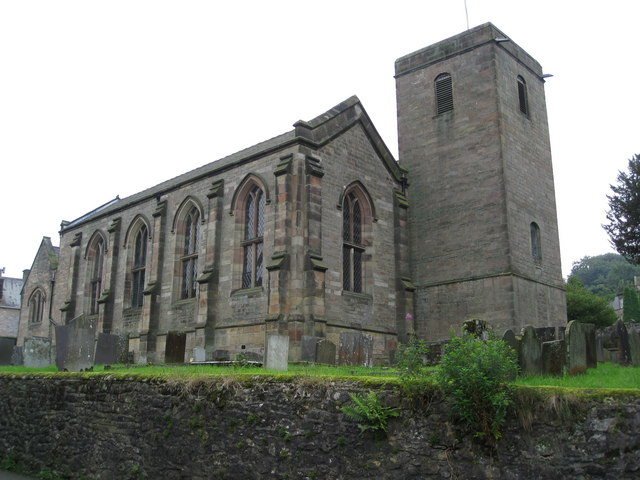
- St John the Baptist’s Church, Winster
- St John the Baptist’s Church, Winster
- 53°08′29.97″N 1°38′37.91″W
- Location: Darley Dale
- Country: England
- Denomination: Church of England
- Website: winsterchurch.org.uk

History
- Dedication: St John the Baptist

Architecture
- Heritage designation: Grade II listed

Administration
- Diocese: Diocese of Derby
- Archdeaconry: Chesterfield
- Deanery: Wirksworth
- Parish: Winster

St John the Baptist's Church, Winster is a Grade II listed parish church in the Church of England in Winster, Derbyshire.

== History ==
The tower dates from 1721. Matthew Habershon made alterations in 1840 to 1842, and A Roland Barker started some restoration in 1884. which was completed in 1885. The chancel was demolished and replaced with a larger one, with Minton tiles in the floor. Vestries for the clergy and the choir were constructed. Choir stalls were inserted, a new altar was added and the lighting was improved. The chancel south wall window is by Burne-Jones and was made by Morris and co in 1883.

== Parish status ==
The church is in a joint parish with:

- Mission Room, Over Hackney
- St Mary the Virgin's Church, South Darley
- St Helen's Church, Darley Dale

== Incumbents ==
- John Aslop 1710 - 1719
- William Cooper 1719 - 1729
- John Gramston 1729 - 1756
- John Steeple 1756 - 1806
- George Pearson 1806 - 1811
- Bache Thornhill 1811 - 1828
- John Carill Worsley 1828 - 1829
- Walter Shirley 1829 - 1839
- George Gayton Harvey 1840
- William Dyke 1846 - 1865
- Herbert Milnes 1865 - 1895
- William Henry Nixon 1895 - 1926 (afterwards vicar of All Saints' Church, Matlock Bank)
- Arthur William Dickens 1926 - 1929 (afterwards vicar of Wroxton, Banbury)
- Andrew Phimister 1929 - 1932
- Arthur J.H. Britton 1932 - 1949 (afterwards Rector of St Mary the Virgin's Church, Weston-on-Trent)
- Austin Neville Ware 1949 - 1955 (afterwards vicar of St Barnabas' Church, Hull)
- Bertram Thomas Abell 1955 - 1964 (afterwards Rector of Holy Cross, Upper Langwith)
- Laurence Herbert Webster 1965 - 1973
- Norman Arthur Gurney 1973 - 1981
- Kenneth Servante 1981 - 1997
- Anthony Carr 1997 - 2006
- John Marshall 2006 - 2011
- Stephen Monk from 2011

== Organ ==
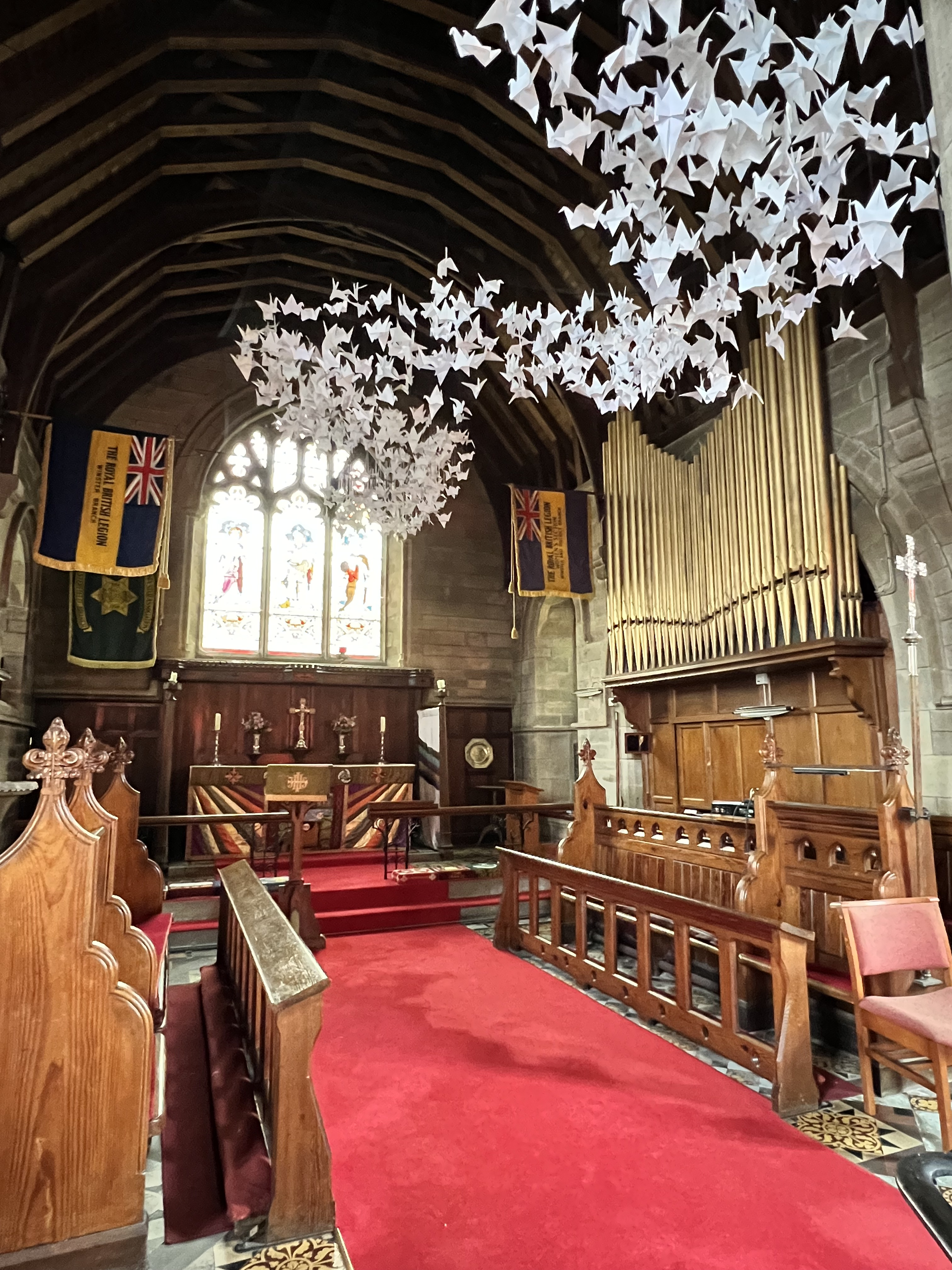
The chancel and pipe organ

The church contains a pipe organ by Abbott. The organ comprised two manuals and pedal with 14 speaking stops and was erected at a cost of £350. The new organ was opened on 28 November 1888 by Arthur Francis Smith of Derby. A specification of the organ can be found on the National Pipe Organ Register.

== Bells ==
The tower contains a ring of 5 bells. The 1st is of 1892 by John Taylor, the 2nd of 1846 by John Taylor, The 3rd of 1880 by John Warner & Sons, the 4th by Daniel Hedderly, and the Tenor by John Warner & Sons of 1860.

== Churchyard ==
The churchyard contains memorials to five soldiers.

- Private Charles Herbert Walker Boam, Pioneer Corps, died 14 August 1944 aged 39
- Serjeant F.C. Taylor, Royal Garrison Artillery, died 6 December 1919 aged 37
- Private George Dale, 5th Battalion Duke of Wellington’s West Riding Regiment, died 23 November 1918 aged 32
- Private Thomas Arthur Needham, 1st Battalion Grenadier Guards, died 11 April 1916 aged 19
- Driver R.A. Newton, 1st Reserve Brigade Royal Field Artillery, died 4 April 1916

== See also ==
- Listed buildings in Winster
