= South Darley =

Parish in Derbyshire, England

Coordinates: 53.149°N 1.600°W

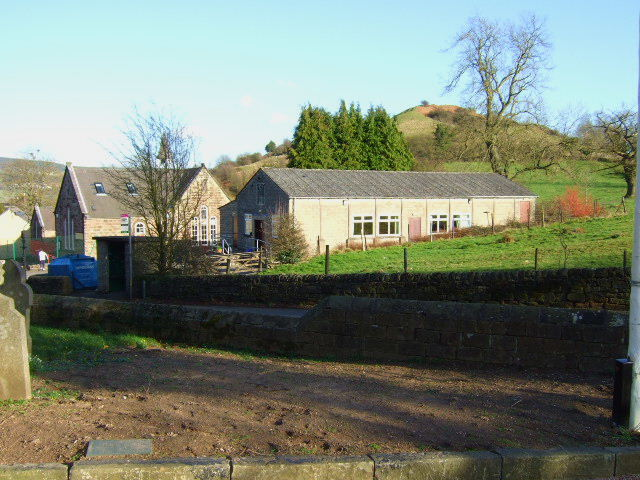
- South Darley Village Hall and School

- Location within Derbyshire
- Civil parish: South Darley
- District: Derbyshire Dales
- Shire county: Derbyshire
- Region: East Midlands
- Country: England
- Sovereign state: United Kingdom
- Post town: MATLOCK
- Dialling code: 01629
- Police: Derbyshire
- Fire: Derbyshire
- Ambulance: East Midlands

South Darley is a civil parish in the Derbyshire Dales. It is a largely rural parish and covers the villages of Darley Bridge, Wensley and the hamlets of Oker and Snitterton. South Darley lies west of Matlock and east of Winster. The River Derwent forms the north-eastern boundary of South Darley parish with Darley Dale parish on the other bank. About two thirds of the parish lies within the Peak District.

South Darley Village Hall is located in the Cross Green area of Darley Bridge and was opened in 1932. It stands next to South Darley Church of England Primary School and opposite Cross Green Plantation.

The parish contains a Grade-II listed church, St Mary the Virgin.

== History ==
South Darley was an urban district from 1894 until it was abolished and merged to form Matlock Urban District in 1934.

== See also ==
- Listed buildings in South Darley
