= Winster Guisers =

The Winster Guisers are a group who perform a traditional mummers play in and around the village of Winster, Derbyshire, UK, during the Christmas season. Their performance is based on a photograph taken c. 1870 outside Winster Hall showing an unidentified set of performers about whom little is known for certain. The Winster Guisers' play is not local to the area, but is a revival (dating from 1980) of a Cheshire play, chosen because it features a hobby horse similar to the one in the centre of the old photograph. A "guiser" (sometimes spelled "guizer") is someone in disguise, though in the Winster area the term was widely used for the teams of Christmas mummers.

== Historical context ==
In the mid 19th century, guisers (mummers) were evidently common in Derbyshire in the week between Christmas and New Year, as can be seen from the notes below, which record around a dozen visits to Winster Hall in the four days 26–30 December 1867.

The village of Winster also has a long-established morris dance tradition. Although the first documentary evidence of morris dancing in Winster dates only from 1863, it seems to have been well established by then. The famous pioneering folklorist Cecil Sharp visited the village in 1908 and noted five dances, including The Processional and The Gallop. All the dancers are men or boys, dressed in white; a full team numbers 16. There are four other characters, also men: the King and Queen, who preside over the dancing, and the Jester (formerly known as the Fool) and the Witch, who entertain the crowd, as Cecil Sharp described: "The dancers danced in procession … through the streets of Winster, stopping at certain places to perform one or two of their stationary dances. The King headed the procession, marching in step with the music … the Queen and the musician walked by the side of the dancers; the Fool and the Witch ran about clearing the way."

=== The Winster Hall photograph ===
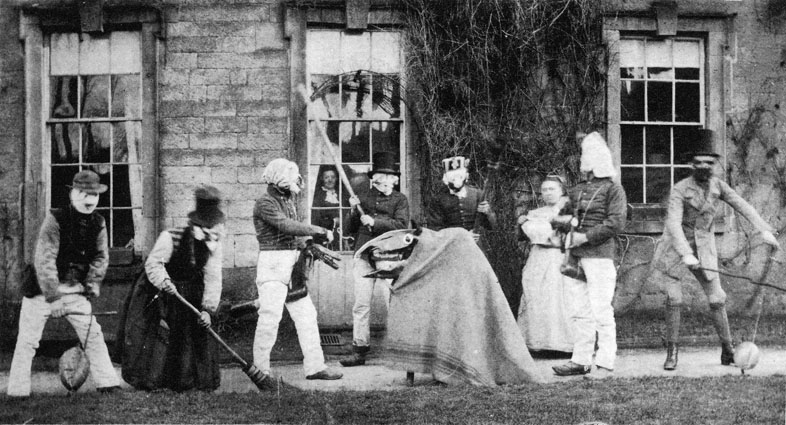
The three Winster hobby horses and other performers, c. 1870

The photograph (right) taken at Winster Hall, Derbyshire, in about 1870 (probably by or for Llewellynn Jewitt (1816–1886), who lived at the house between 1868 and 1880) shows a possibly unique midwinter custom involving three hobby horses. (The picture appears to have been taken in winter, as the climbing plants on the wall are leafless.) Eight or nine performers are involved; all (bar one?) have facial disguise. It has been claimed to be the oldest known photograph of a group of mummers or guisers.

Two men wearing military-looking jackets, buttoned to the neck, and white trousers stand astride small hobby horses of an apparently unique design: a cylindrical body, "about three inches diameter and two feet long", held between the rider's legs (supported at the front by a cord or narrow strap around the rider's neck), with a flat, curved wooden neck and a small, stylised head with snapping jaws (apart from their mouths, the horses look almost like simple rocking horses with the legs removed). The horsemen are faceless: their heads are wrapped in light-coloured cloth.

The performers are grouped around a "mast horse" with a shiny black head made from a skull (with ears attached and a large eyeball in its white-painted eye socket) set on a short pole. It is operated by a person who crouches under a blanket, attached to the back of the skull, that hides most of the pole. Behind this horse are two men who seem to be threatening it, one with a long stick like the handle of a brush or rake, the other with a besom broom (blurred). The one with the stick wears white trousers, a dark jacket and a top hat; his face is disguised, perhaps by a mask or possibly wrapped in cloth. The other has a dark jacket and a flat-topped, ornate hat that looks like a smoking cap; he may be wearing a mask or perhaps a painted-on beard; his legs cannot be seen.

Next to them stands a rather matronly woman in a long apron; she has no facial disguise and is possibly a member of the household staff rather than a performer; another smartly dressed person, also possibly a servant is looking out of the house through a window in the door.

Another character wears a rather voluminous, tattered, long, dark dress with pale sleeves (or a pale blouse under it) and a top hat. Busily brushing the ground with a besom broom, "she" is reminiscent of the character Besom Bet who appears in some mummers plays or the Winster morris Witch.

The last two characters, on the outer edges of the group, are playing rough music on bladder fiddles. One has his face disguised with a simple (cloth?) mask and wears a peaked cap. He wears white trousers, and possibly a dark, sleeveless jerkin over a paler, long-sleeved garment. The other "musician" is more smartly dressed, in top hat, a long riding jacket, breeches, tight, knee-length socks or gaiters and polished shoes. He has what appears to be a false beard and bushy eyebrows.

=== Mummers or morris dancers? ===
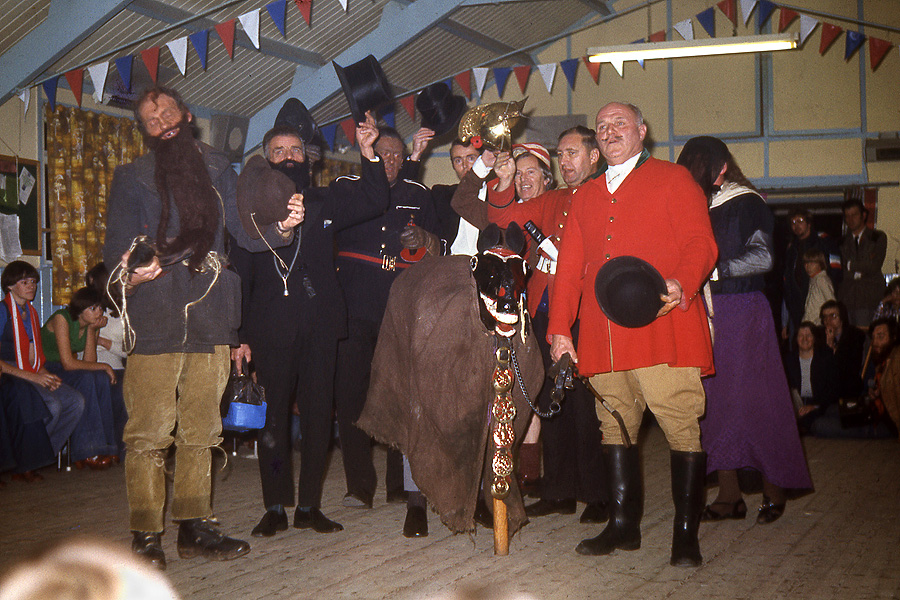
The Antrobus Soul-cakers with Dick, the Wild Horse (mid 1970s)

The performance may have been arranged by Llewellynn Jewitt, who lived at the hall between 1868 and 1880. In 1931, Stanley Evans ("Folk Dancing in Derbyshire", Derbyshire Countryside, vol 1, no 2, April 1931, p29) suggested the performers may have been performing a mumming play. Cawte dismissed this suggestion: "if so it is a most unusual one, there is no sign of the combatants, the pair of horses is of an unusual design, and the mast horse seems to be the centre of attention." But, despite the absence of weapons, it is not difficult to envisage the two military-looking characters on hobby-horses as possible combatants, or even the two characters behind who are waving a pole and a broomstick. Moreover, the "Wild Horse" is a central character in the Soul-caking plays of nearby Cheshire (see photo).

In his field notes, made in 1908, folklorist Cecil Sharp referred to a hobby horse "without a curtain" being connected with the morris dance at Winster; he also mentions a "Snap Dragon" made from "a real horse's head" (presumably a skull) dug up for the purpose, but does not say whether it was associated with the morris. It seems he did not see them himself, and his account published in 1924, long after his visit to Winster, is confusing. In 1966, Winster morris dancers stated that there had never been a hobby horse associated with their morris, but that there had been a separate horse ceremony involving a skull that was reburied each year. It seems possible that Sharp's "Snap Dragon" and the horse ceremony recalled by the morris men are the same custom that is shown in the Winster Hall photograph.

== Llewellynn Jewitt's own notes (1867) ==
In 1867 Jewitt recorded several visits to Winster Hall by groups of traditional performers (some being children, others men): 'guisers', 'mummers', the 'hobby horse' and 'Snap Dragon'. Jewitt differentiates between 'Snap Dragon' and 'Hobby Horse(s)' but does not describe how they were made, or how they differed, but implies that they did not always go out together. If Sharp is correct and Snap Dragon was made from a horse's skull, the photograph may show one such "conjoined" team of guisers. Jewitt also seems to have seen several different hobby horses and two different Snap Dragons (the Winster one and another) during these four days, as it is unlikely he would have paid the same team twice in two days.

December 26th. — This evening we had several sets of children 'guising,' dressed up in all sorts of queer ways, and singing one thing or other. The 'Hobby Horse' came too. Five men — one as a devil, one as a woman, one as an old woman with a besom, one with the Hobby Horse, and one as something or other else. We had them in the kitchen and gave them money.

December 27th. — Troops of children 'guising' again. We gave something to each lot. In the evening the Winster 'Snap Dragon' and 'Hobby Horse' conjoined came to us — ten men, one as Snap Dragon, two with Hobby Horses, two devils, etc., etc. We had them in the kitchen and gave them money.

December 28th. — This evening the Wensley 'Mummers' came — nine — and we had them in the kitchen and gave them refreshments and money. They played 'Robin Hood' excellently well, and sang afterwards several excellent songs. They were most interesting. Troops of children again.

December 30th. — This evening had two parties of 'guisers' in the house. The first — five — were so dull and stupid that I packed them off soon. The second set — eleven — with 'Snap Dragon' and two 'Hobby Horses' were very good, and sang and recited well.
