= Winster Market House =

Municipal building in Winster, Derbyshire, England

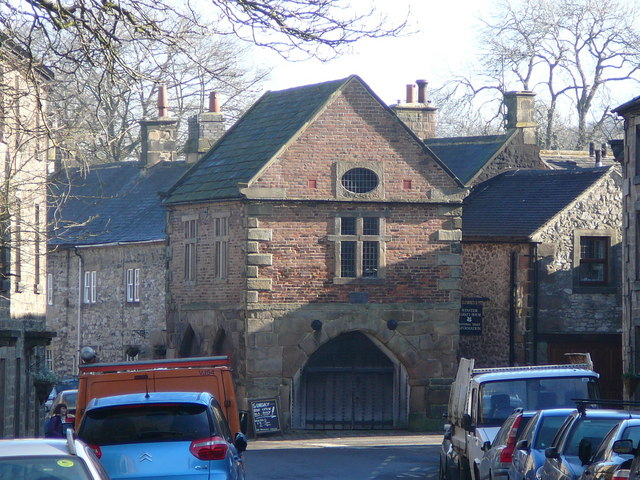
- The building in 2008

- Shown in Derbyshire
- 53.1416°N 1.6402°W
- Location: Main Street, Winster

History
- Built: Probably c.1570

Site notes
- Architectural style: Neoclassical style

Listed Building – Grade II*
- Official name: The Market Hall
- Designated: 29 September 1951
- Reference no.: 1245115

The Market House is a historic building in the Main Street in Winster, a town in Derbyshire, England. The building, which is currently in use a visitor exhibition centre, is a Grade II* listed building.

== History ==
The building was commissioned by the lord of the manor which, from 1570, was Gervase and Anthony Eyre of Newbold Manor. It was designed in the neoclassical style, built in coursed stone and red brick and was completed in the 16th century.

It was originally open on the ground floor, so that markets could be held, with an assembly hall on the first floor. The design involved a symmetrical main frontage of two bays facing north onto Main Street. There were short columns with imposts supporting stone arches on the ground floor, while the first floor was faced in brick, and fenestrated by cross-windows with stone surrounds. The end bays were similar in style except that the gables above contained oval-shaped oculi. Internally, the principal room was the assembly room on the first floor.

Ownership of the building was passed down generations of the Eyre family until Anne Eyre married Clotworthy Skeffington, 1st Earl of Massereene in 1741. It then passed down the Skeffington family until at least the early 19th century.

The arches were infilled with coursed stone, probably in the first half of the 19th century, to encourage alternative use. The use of the building for the sale of agricultural goods declined significantly in the wake of the Great Depression of British Agriculture in the late 19th century. The building fell vacant and its condition deteriorated rapidly. During the late 19th century, it was acquired by Joseph Greatorex, owner of the Old Bowling Green Inn in East Bank, which was located just to the south of the market house. Greatorex agreed to sell the market house to the National Trust, this being its first acquisition in Derbyshire, for £50, in 1906.

The first floor was in a particularly poor condition, and it was restored to a design by William Weir, architect to the National Trust, using local labour under the supervision of Henry Rye, architect to Henry Manners, 8th Duke of Rutland. The assembly room was subsequently fitted out with interpretation panels detailing the history of Winster and, in particular, its importance to the mining industry. A scale model of the village was also constructed and included in the exhibition there.

== See also ==
- Listed buildings in Winster
- Grade II* listed buildings in Derbyshire Dales
