= Listed buildings in Darley Dale =

Darley Dale is a civil parish in the Derbyshire Dales district of Derbyshire, England. The parish contains 27 listed buildings that are recorded in the National Heritage List for England. Of these, three are listed at Grade II*, the middle of the three grades, and the others are at Grade II, the lowest grade. The parish contains the town of Darley Dale and the surrounding area. Most of the listed buildings are houses, cottages and associated structures, farmhouses and farm buildings. The other listed buildings include a church and its former rectory, a road bridge over the River Derwent, public houses, a mile post and a milestone, buildings associated with Darley Dale railway station, an institute, and a school.

== Key ==
Grade	Criteria
II*	Particularly important buildings of more than special interest
II	Buildings of national importance and special interest

== Buildings ==
Name and location	Photograph	Date	Notes	Grade
St Helen's Church; 53.16337°N 1.60242°W		13th century	The church, which contains Norman features, has been altered and extended through the centuries, and it was restored in 1854–55. The church consists of a nave, north and south aisles, a south porch, north and south transepts, a chancel, and a west tower. The tower has angle buttresses, a west doorway and window, and an embattled parapet with corner pinnacles. The transepts are also embattled.	II*
Darley Bridge; 53.15515°N 1.59696°W		15th century	The bridge carries the B5057 road over the River Derwent. It is in stone, and consists of two pointed arches, each with four ribs, and three semicircular arches.	II*
Fir Tree Cottage; 53.16377°N 1.57997°W	—	1633	The cottage is in stone with a tile roof and two storeys. Most of the mullioned windows have been replaced. The doorway has a chamfered surround, and at its head are carvings, including a trowel and rosettes, an inscription, and the date.	II
Outbuilding of Rectory; 53.16328°N 1.60189°W		17th century	A long stone building with a tile roof and two storeys. It contains a doorway with a chamfered surround, mullioned windows, and three 17th-century inscribed stone panels.	II
Stancliffe Hall; 53.17217°N 1.60113°W	—	1670	A large house that was enlarged in 1872, and again in 18779–85 by E. M. Barry. It is in stone with moulded floor bands, pilasters, parapets, and coped gables with ball finials. There are two storeys and attics, and a south front of nine bays. The windows are mullioned and transomed, and some have been altered. On the west is a large porch and a doorway with a moulded and chamfered surround, and carved plinth blocks.	II
White House; 53.16357°N 1.60247°W	—	Late 17th century (probable)	A stone house with a tile roof and two storeys. The doorway has a plain surround, there is a rustic wooden porch, and the windows are casements with chamfered surrounds.	II
The Cottage; 53.16451°N 1.58402°W	—	1704	A stone house with moulded eaves, and a roof of slate and tile with gables and kneelers. There are two storeys, two bays, and a wing. The doorway has a chamfered surround, and a slight dentilled cornice, over which is a large moulded panel with rosettes in the spandrels, initials and the date. The windows are mullioned with two lights.	II
Square and Compass public house 53.15579°N 1.59685°W		1735	The public house is in stone with quoins and a Welsh slate roof. The building is in four sections, all with two storeys, and with different roof heights. The left section contains a doorway with a massive surround and the date. In each of the middle two sections are segmental arches. The windows are a mix of sashes and casements, and on the front of the building is a parish boundary post.	II
Cottage, barn and pigsties, Farley Farm; 53.15587°N 1.56230°W	—	18th century	The cottage is in stone with quoins, a floor band, and a Welsh slate roof with coped gables and moulded kneelers. There are two storeys and a symmetrical front of three bays. In the centre is a doorway with a moulded cornice, above it is a blocked oval window, and the other windows are mullioned with two lights. Attached to the left is a barn, and further to the left are pigsties.	II
Plough Inn; 53.16355°N 1.58148°W		1755	The public house is in stone and has a tile roof with kneelers. There are two storeys and three bays. The central doorway has a plain surround and a slight moulded cornice, and above it is an initialled and dated panel. The windows are mullioned with two lights and contain sashes.	II
Wingate Cottage; 53.17088°N 1.59183°W	—	1770	A stone house with quoins, a band, moulded eaves, and a tile roof. There are two storeys and three bays. The central doorway has a quoined surround and a pediment, and above it is a circular dated plaque. In the outer bays are sash windows in architraves, those in the ground floor with double keystones.	II
Darley Hall; 53.16464°N 1.58792°W	—	1796–97	A large house that has been altered and later used for other purposes. It is in stone with a parapet and a hipped slate roof. There are three storeys and three bays. On the front is a Roman Doric porch, on the right is an angled bay window, and the other windows are sashes.	II
Holt House; 53.16122°N 1.57689°W	—	c. 1798	A stone house with thin giant Ionic pilasters on the front, a moulded cornice, and a parapet. There are three storeys, the ground floor rusticated, and three bays. In the centre, steps on each side lead up to an entrance in the middle floor with a French window, and below it is a recessed arched entrance to the lower floor. The windows are sashes in moulded architraves.	II*
Grouse Inn; 53.16704°N 1.59931°W		Early 19th century	The public house is in stone with a tile roof. There are two storeys and three bays. In the centre is a Tuscan portico with an iron balustrade, and a doorway with a moulded surround and a segmental-headed fanlight. The windows are sashes.	II
Milepost; 53.16224°N 1.58933°W		Early 19th century	The milepost is by a wall on the east side of Dale Road North (A6 road). It is in cast iron with a shaped top, and is inscribed with the distances to London, Bakewell and Matlock.	II
Milestone; 53.15047°N 1.57571°W		Early 19th century	The milestone is on the southwest side of Dale Road South (A6 road). It consists of a stone with a triangular section and a sloping top, inscribed with the distances to London, Bakewell and Matlock.	II
Sydnope Hall; 53.17282°N 1.56180°W		1826–27	The rebuilding of an earlier house in Tudor style, it was further altered in 1865, and has since been converted into flats. It is in stone with embattled parapets and a roof mainly in tiles. There are two storeys, a three-storey tower towards the left, and a long front of ten bays. On the front is a porch with buttresses, and two canted bay windows, all embattled, and the other windows have square hood moulds.	II
North building, Darley Dale railway station 53.16045°N 1.59393°W		c. 1849	The station building is in stone with dentilled eaves, and slate roofs with moulded gable copings, kneelers and ball finials. The doorways, which are arched, and the windows, which are mullioned, all have hood moulds extending as bands.	II
South building, Darley Dale railway station 53.16032°N 1.59433°W		c. 1849	The station building is in stone with dentilled eaves, and slate roofs with moulded gable copings, kneelers and ball finials. Two bays project slightly and are gabled. The doorways, which are arched, and the windows, which are mullioned, all have hood moulds extending as bands.	II
Darley Station Houses; 53.16015°N 1.59329°W	—	c. 1849	A pair of houses, later combined, designed by Joseph Paxton, they are in stone with a slate roof. There are two storeys and four bays. The windows are casements, those in the ground floor with semicircular heads.	II
West Lodge; 53.16840°N 1.60188°W		c. 1872	The house is in stone with a string course, a sill band, a moulded dentilled eaves cornice, and a slate roof, hipped and partly conical, with pinnacles. There are two storeys and attics. At the front is a large semicircular projection with an arcaded frieze between the floors, and a bay to the right. The windows are sashes with architraves, and in the roof are dormers with semicircular moulded stone architraves and finials. On the left return is a large porch with panelled sides, massive corner piers with pediments, and an arched doorway.	II
Boundary walls and gate piers, Stancliffe Hall; 53.17220°N 1.59886°W	—	1870s	The walls are in gritstone with saddleback coping. At the entrance to the drive, they sweep up to monolithic gate piers with caps.	II
Boundary walls to former Whitworth Estate (north); 53.17277°N 1.59927°W	—	1870s	The walls are in gritstone with saddleback coping. At the curved corners, and at the entrance to the drive, they sweep up to gate piers with caps. In the southwest corner is set a VR post box.	II
Boundary walls to former Whitworth Estate (south); 53.16810°N 1.59988°W	—	1870s	The walls run in sections along Whitworth Road and Dale Road North, and are in gritstone with saddleback copings. Incorporated in the wall are monolithic gate piers, and a horse trough in a tall arched recess. The arch has rustication voussoirs and a keystone, and at the head of the arch is a massive ashlar semicircular cresting.	II
Former Whitworth Hotel; 53.16221°N 1.59012°W		Late 19th century	The building is in stone, and has a roof of green Westmorland slate with gables, kneelers and ball finials. There are two storeys and attics, and three bays, the outer bays projecting and gabled. In the middle bay is a porch, two doorways and a tile roof. Above is a three-light mullioned and transomed window, and in the attic is a dormer with a semicircular pediment. The outer bays have five-light mullioned and transomed windows in the lower two floors, and three-light mullioned windows in the attics.	II
Whitworth Institute; 53.16240°N 1.59036°W		1890	The building is in stone, and has a roof of green Westmorland slate with coped gables, kneelers and ball finials. There are two blocks, the left block with two storeys and five bays. In the ground floor is an arcade of five arches, and the upper floor contains mullioned and transomed windows, in the middle and outer bays under gables. On the roof is a cupola. On each side are single-storey links with balustrades, on the right linking with the assembly hall. This has a single storey and three bays, each with a three-light mullioned window and a gablet above.	II
Darley Dale Infants School; 53.15913°N 1.58088°W		1911	The school was designed by George Widdows, and is in gritstone with quoins and a mansard roof of Westmorland slate and tile. The front is symmetrical, with six single-storey bays, and a central two-storey bay. The outermost and central bays have half-hipped mansard roofs, and the four intermediate bays contain full-height multi-paned mullioned and transomed windows under catslide roofs. At the rear was an open corridor, which has since been closed.	II
