= Listed buildings in Winster =

Winster is a civil parish in the Derbyshire Dales district of Derbyshire, England. The parish contains 68 listed buildings that are recorded in the National Heritage List for England. Of these, two are listed at Grade II*, the middle of the three grades, and the others are at Grade II, the lowest grade. The parish contains the village of Winster and the surrounding countryside. Most of the listed buildings are houses, cottages and associated structures. The other listed buildings include a former market hall, a church and a chapel, a former workhouse, a public house, two mileposts, a schoolroom and a telephone kiosk.

== Key ==
Grade	Criteria
II*	Particularly important buildings of more than special interest
II	Buildings of national importance and special interest

== Buildings ==
Name and location	Photograph	Date	Notes	Grade
The Market Hall; 53.14164°N 1.64019°W		15th or 16th century	The ground floor is in gritstone, and the upper parts were rebuilt in brick with gritstone dressings in 1903. There are two storeys and two bays. The ground floor contains pointed arches, now infilled, rising from a central column with a moulded band. The upper parts have quoins, floor bands, coved eaves, and a stone slate roof with moulded copings and kneelers. The windows are mullioned and transomed, and in the gables are oval windows.	II*
Bank House, wall and gate piers 53.14098°N 1.64332°W		17th century	The house, which has been refashioned and extended, is in gritstone, with quoins, and a stone slate roof with moulded copings and kneelers. There are two storeys and attics, and a T-shaped plan, with a front of two bays. The doorway has a quoined surround and a semicircular hood. Most of the windows are mullioned, and on the front they have been converted into sashes or casements. At the rear is an added canted bay window with an open balustraded parapet. To the north is a tall boundary wall containing a pair of square gate piers with semicircular-headed moulded caps.	II
Dene Croft; 53.14179°N 1.64032°W	—	Mid 17th century	The house, its gable end facing the street, is in gritstone with quoins, and a stone slate roof with moulded copings and kneelers. There are three storeys and a front of five bays. Most of the windows on the front are mullioned, and in the gable ends they are sashes. On the front are two doorways, one dating from the 17th-century, blocked, and with a surround of massive chamfered quoins, and adjacent is an inserted doorway with quoins and a lintel.	II
House northwest of The Bowling Green Inn; 53.14147°N 1.64038°W	—	17th century	Two dwellings combined into one house, it is in gritstone with quoins, and a Welsh slate roof with a kneeler on the north gable. There are two storeys and four bays. On the front are two doorways, one with a quoined surround, the windows have been altered, and at the north end is a semicircular carriage arch with quoins and a keystone.	II
The Old Bakehouse; 53.14184°N 1.64072°W	—	17th century	The bakehouse to Winster Hall, later a private house, is in limestone with gritstone dressings, quoins, and a Welsh slate roof. There are two storeys and a cellar, and a T-shaped plan, with a front of two bays. The doorway has a quoined surround and a chamfered lintel. The windows on the front are casements, and elsewhere they are mullioned, the cellar window with a moulded band.	II
Dower House; 53.14180°N 1.64293°W		Late 17th century	The house, which has been altered and extended, is in limestone with gritstone dressings, quoins, string courses, and a Welsh slate roof with coped gables and moulded kneelers. There are three storeys and an irregular south front of four bays. Most of the windows on the front are mullioned. The east front has two gables, sash windows, and a doorway with a moulded shouldered architrave.	II
Gate piers and walls, Dower House; 53.14179°N 1.64269°W	—	Late 17th century	The gate piers are in gritstone with a square plan, they are carved with motifs, including grotesque masks, foliage, cartouches, guttae and serpents, and are surmounted by square moulded caps. The boundary walls are in gritstone and limestone with shallow hogsback copings.	II
Heathcote House and Cottage; 53.14203°N 1.64221°W	—	Late 17th century	The house and cottage are in gritstone with quoins, and roofs of Welsh slate, stone slate and tile with coped gables and moulded kneelers. There are two storeys and attics, and four bays, the east bay lower. On the front are two doorways with quoined surrounds and massive lintels. The windows are mullioned, and in the attics are dormers. At the rear are single-storey extensions and a two-storey stair tower.	II
House southwest of The Headlands; 53.14096°N 1.64016°W	—	Late 17th century	The house is in limestone, partly roughcast, with gritstone dressings, quoins, coved eaves, and a tile roof with coped gables and moulded kneelers. There are two storeys, and an L-shaped plan, with a front of three bays. On the south front are two doorways, one blocked, the other with a massive quoined surround and lintel. The windows have been altered and either have a single light or are sashes.	II
St John the Baptist's Church; 53.14183°N 1.64353°W		1721	The oldest part of the church is the tower, the rest of the church was built in 1840–42 and designed by Matthew Habershon, and it was altered and extended in 1884–85. The church is built in gritstone with a Welsh slate roof, and consists of a nave, a south porch, a chancel with an organ chamber and a vestry, and a west tower. The tower has a chamfered plinth, quoins, a moulded string course, a doorway with a quoined chamfered surround, windows and bell openings with segmental heads, a clock face, and a plain parapet.	II
Denver House; 53.14159°N 1.64092°W	—	Early 18th century	A house, its gable end facing the street, in gritstone with quoins, and a Welsh slate roof with moulded copings and kneelers. There are three storeys and a front of a single bay. In the ground floor are a doorway and a former shop window, above are sash windows, and in the east front are two-light mullioned windows.	II
House east of Holmelea; 53.14187°N 1.64235°W		Early 18th century	The house, with its gable end facing the street, is in gritstone with quoins, a coved eaves band, and a tile roof with coped gables and moulded kneelers. There are two storeys and attics, and three bays. The doorway has a massive quoined surround and lintel. The windows vary; some are mullioned, some are sashes and there is a stair window.	II
Inglenook; 53.14219°N 1.64075°W	—	Early 18th century	Two cottages combined into one house in limestone and gritstone with quoins and a Welsh slate roof with a coped north gable and moulded kneelers. There are two storeys and two bays. The windows are mixed, with a sash window, a casement window, and mullioned windows. On the front are two doorways, one with massive jambs and a keystone, blocked with an inserted window.	II
Jasmine Cottage and attached house 53.14062°N 1.64060°W		Early 18th century	A house and attached cottage in limestone and gritstone, with quoins, and a roof with a coped north gable and moulded kneelers. There are two storeys and an attic, and three bays. The house has a doorway with a massive quoined surround and lintel, the cottage has an inserted doorway, and the windows have been altered.	II
Smithy House; 53.14171°N 1.64217°W	—	Early 18th century	The house is in gritstone with sill bands, coved eaves, and a Welsh slate roof with coped gables and moulded kneelers. There are three storeys and three bays. On the front are two doorways, one in the central, and the other to the left. The windows are mullioned, and contain sashes or fixed lights.	II
Winster Hall; 53.14187°N 1.64096°W		Early 18th century	A small country house, later used for other purposes, in gritstone with rusticated quoins, an eaves cornice, and an open balustrades parapet. There are three storeys, a square plan and five bays, the middle bay on the front flanked by giant pilasters. The central doorway has Doric half-columns and a moulded pediment. The windows are sashes in shouldered architraves with keystones, and in the middle of the top floor is a bulls-eye window.	II*
6–8 Wooley's Yard; 53.14116°N 1.64164°W	—	18th century	A row of four, later three, cottages in limestone with gritstone dressings, roofs of Welsh slate and tile, and two storeys. The doorways have heavy lintels, and one has a quoined surround. The windows either have a single light or are mullioned, and one rises into a gabled dormer.	II
9 and 10 Wooley's Yard; 53.14106°N 1.64171°W		18th century	A house in limestone with gritstone dressings, quoins, and a Welsh slate roof. There are three storeys and two bays. On the front are two doorways, one with a massive lintel, the other blocked to form a window. The windows are mullioned, some with fixed lights and others with sashes.	II
Outbuilding north of 11 Wooley's Yard; 53.14103°N 1.64190°W	—	Mid 18th century	The outbuilding is in limestone with gritstone dressings, quoins, and a tile roof with coped gables and moulded kneelers. There are two storeys, and the gable end faces the street. The doorway has a massive quoined surround and lintel, and in the ground floor is a sash window.	II
Anson Row and Portaway Cottage; 53.14073°N 1.64013°W	—	18th century	A terrace of four cottages in limestone with gritstone dressings, quoins, and stone slate roofs. There are two storeys, and each cottage has two bays. On the front is a doorway with a massive quoined surround and a heavy lintel, and the windows are casements.	II
Bank House; 53.14162°N 1.64144°W		18th century	The house, at one time a bank, is in limestone on a moulded plinth, with gritstone dressings, quoins, an eaves band, and a Welsh slate roof. There are two storeys and three bays. The central doorway has a moulded surround and an entablature. The window over the doorway is a sash with a moulded architrave and a pediment, and the other windows are casements.	II
Briar Cottage and outbuilding 53.14198°N 1.64299°W	—	18th century	The house is in limestone with gritstone dressings, quoins, and a Welsh slate roof with coped gables and moulded kneelers. There are three storeys and a single bay. The windows are mullioned with two sashes. At the west end is a blocked doorway and a limestone wall about 2.5 metres (8 ft 2 in) high containing a doorway with a quoined chamfered surround, and at the east end is a single-storey limestone outbuilding.	II
Carillon; 53.14165°N 1.64160°W	—	Mid 18th century	Two cottages later combined into one house, it is in limestone with gritstone dressings, and a tile roof with a coped gable and moulded kneelers at the east end. There are two storeys and three bays. On the front are coupled doorways with massive lintels, and the windows are sashes.	II
Dale Cottage and Tite Cottage; 53.14165°N 1.63983°W	—	Mid 18th century	A pair of houses in limestone with gritstone dressings, quoins, coved eaves, coped gables and moulded kneelers. There are two storeys and four bays. On the front are three doorways, one with a chamfered quoined surround and a massive lintel, and most of the windows are mullioned.	II
Gate piers and walls, Winster Hall; 53.14175°N 1.64099°W		18th century	The gate piers are square with V-joints, and each pier has a moulded cap and a ball finial. Flanking these, and joined by low walls with railings, are smaller and lower piers, and outside these are walls with hogsback copings.	II
Grey Tor; 53.14120°N 1.64251°W	—	Mid 18th century	The house is in gritstone with quoins, and an asbestos slate roof with moulded copings and kneelers. There are two storeys and four bays. The central doorway has a quoined surround and a massive lintel, above it is a blocked bull's-eye window, and the other windows have top-hung lights.	II
Holmelea; 53.14184°N 1.64253°W		18th century	A house and shop in limestone with gritstone dressings, quoins, coped gables and moulded kneelers. There are three storeys, and an L-shaped plan with a front of three bays. In the centre is a doorway with a quoined surround and a rectangular fanlight, and to its right is a shop window. The other windows are sashes, the window above the doorway with lozenge glazing.	II
House northeast of Bradley House; 53.14020°N 1.64096°W	—	18th century	The house is in limestone with gritstone dressings, quoins, and a Welsh slate roof with a coped north gable and moulded kneelers. There are two storeys and three bays. The doorway has a massive quoined surround and a moulded lintel, the windows in the east bay are mullioned, and elsewhere they are replacement casements.	II
House north of Dene Croft; 53.14192°N 1.64032°W	—	18th century	The house is in limestone with gritstone dressings, quoins, coved eaves, and a Welsh slate roof with a coped north gable and moulded kneelers. There are two storeys and three bays. The doorway has a massive quoined surround and a deep lintel, and the windows are mullioned with sashes. At the south end is an arched carriage entrance.	II
Kirby House and shop 53.14170°N 1.64247°W	—	18th century	The house and shop are in gritstone with quoins, a coved eaves band, and a Welsh slate roof with coped gables. There are three storeys and three bays. On the right is a shop front and a doorway, to its left is a doorway with a quoined surround and a massive lintel, and further to the left is a doorway converted into a window. The other windows are sashes.	II
Lansdowne House and Georgic House; 53.14176°N 1.63940°W		Mid 18th century	A pair of houses in gritstone with quoins, sill bands, a dentilled eaves cornice, and roofs of Welsh slate and stone slate with coped gables and moulded kneelers. There are three storeys and three bays, the middle bay projecting slightly and flanked by pilasters. In the ground and middle floors of the middle bay are Venetian windows, the centre light of the upper floor window with a depressed pointed arch. Flanking these are doorways with Doric columns, triglyph friezes and entablatures. The other windows are sashes, those in the ground floor of the outer bays with semicircular heads, imposts and keystones. Below the middle floor windows are balustrades.	II
Manse House; 53.14026°N 1.64058°W	—	Mid 18th century	The house is in limestone with gritstone dressings, quoins, a projecting eaves band, a moulded eaves gutter, a stone slate roof, and coped gables and moulded kneelers. There are three storeys and two bays. The doorway has a segmental pediment, and the windows are sashes. On the south front is a shallow stair turret with a three-stage stair window. To the west is a two-storey single-bay extension with a Welsh slate roof.	II
Moot House and The Cottage; 53.14157°N 1.64051°W		Mid 18th century	A house divided into three, part of which was a shop. It is in limestone with quoins, coved eaves, and a Welsh slate roof with coped gables and moulded kneelers. There are three storeys and three bays. On the front are a bow shop front, a bow window, and three doorways with quoined surrounds and massive lintels. Most of the other windows on the front are sashes, and on the side and at the rear are mullioned windows.	II
Old Parish Poorhouse; 53.13860°N 1.64474°W		18th century	A workhouse, later a farmhouse, it is in gritstone with quoins and a roof of stone slate and tile. There are two storeys, three bays, and a single-storey lean-to on the southwest. The central doorway and the windows, which are sashes, have round-arched heads with keystones. The window above the doorway has a single light, and the others are mullioned with two lights.	II
Outbuilding southwest of the chapel 53.14090°N 1.64061°W	—	18th century	The outbuilding is in limestone with gritstone dressings, and a tile roof with coped gables. There are two storeys and three bays. In the ground floor are two doorways with quoined surrounds, external steps lead up to an upper floor doorway, and the upper floor contains a sash window and an opening with a shutter.	II
Pair of cottages southwest of the chapel 53.14081°N 1.64057°W	—	18th century	The cottages are in limestone, partly rendered, with gritstone dressings, quoins, and a Welsh slate roof. There are two storeys and two bays. The doorways have plain surrounds, on the right cottage is a rustic porch, and the windows are mullioned with two lights.	II
Rock View; 53.13994°N 1.64206°W	—	18th century	A house in roughcast limestone with gritstone dressings, quoins, and a Welsh slate roof with moulded kneelers. There are two storeys and two bays. The central doorway, which is blocked, has a massive quoined surround, and there are later doorways in extensions. The windows are mullioned with casements.	II
Rose Cottage, West Bank; 53.14089°N 1.64339°W	—	Mid 18th century	The cottage, which incorporates earlier material, is in stone with gritstone dressings, quoins, and a tile roof with coped gables and moulded kneelers. There are two storeys, and the gable end faces the street. The doorway has a plain surround, and the windows are sashes.	II
Rosedene; 53.14200°N 1.64039°W	—	Mid 18th century	The house is in limestone with gritstone dressings, quoins and a stone slate roof. There are two storeys and two bays. The central doorway has a massive stone surround, and the windows are 20th-century replacements.	II
The Bowling Green Inn; 53.14134°N 1.64009°W		18th century	The public house is in gritstone with quoins, and a roof of tile and Welsh slate with coped gables. There are two storeys and attics, a T-shaped plan, and a front of two bays. The windows on the front are sashes, and in the attics are gabled dormers with copings and kneelers, containing mullioned windows. The windows on the sides and rear are also mullioned.	II
The Lodge; 53.14162°N 1.64112°W	—	18th century	The house, at one time an inn, is in roughcast stone with quoins, and a Welsh slate roof with a coped west gable. There are three storeys and three bays. The main doorway has a quoined surround, and a flat canopy on moulded brackets. To the left is a carriage entrance with a timber lintel, and a doorway with a quoined surround and a massive lintel. The windows are sashes, some with mullions.	II
The Old Forge; 53.14191°N 1.63950°W	—	18th century	The house is in limestone and gritstone with gritstone dressings, quoins, coved eaves, and a Welsh slate roof with coped gables. There are two storeys and three bays. The central doorway has a quoined surround and a rectangular fanlight, and to the right is a blocked doorway with a quoined surround and a massive lintel. The windows are mullioned, and contain casements.	II
The Old House; 53.14185°N 1.64204°W	—	18th century	The house is in limestone with a gritstone front, quoins, an eaves band, and a Welsh slate roof with coped gables and moulded kneelers. There are three storeys and three bays. The central doorway has a heavy quoined surround and a semicircular hood with moulded brackets. To its left is a semicircular bay window, and the other windows are sashes.	II
The Old Shoulder of Mutton Inn; 53.14119°N 1.64275°W		Mid 18th century	A public house, later a private house, in limestone and gritstone, that has a Welsh slate roof with coped gables and moulded kneelers. There are two storeys and four bays, and an added bay on the left. The doorway has a massive quoined surround and lintel. The ground floor windows are casements, and in the upper floor are sash windows with keystones. The left bay contains a cart opening with a timber lintel on corbels, and above it is a sash window.	II
Virginia House; 53.14184°N 1.64181°W		Mid 18th century	The house is in limestone with gritstone dressings, quoins, and a Welsh slate roof with coped gables. There are three storeys and three bays. The central doorway has a heavy quoined surround, and the windows are sashes.	II
Woodhays; 53.14178°N 1.64050°W		Mid 18th century	A house, later a shop, in limestone with gritstone dressings, quoins, floor bands, and a Welsh slate roof with coped gables and moulded kneelers. There are two storeys and attics, the gable end faces the street, and on the sides are five bays. In the gable end are a shop windows with sash windows above. On the front is a central doorway with a quoined surround and a massive lintel, and a blocked upper floor doorway with a quoined surround. The windows are casements, and some are blocked.	II
Archway House; 53.14171°N 1.63954°W		1754	The house is in gritstone with quoins, floor bands, a moulded eaves band, and a Welsh slate roof with coped gables and moulded kneelers. There are three storeys and three bays. In the right bay is a carriageway arch with a keystone, and to its left is a doorway with a quoined surround, a massive lintel and a hood mould. Above the doorway is an initialled and dated tablet, and the windows are mullioned with two lights.	II
2 and 3 Woodhouse Lane; 53.14210°N 1.64076°W		Late 18th century	A pair of houses in limestone with gritstone dressings, quoins, and roofs of Welsh slate and tile. There are two storeys and each house has two bays. The doorways have quoined surrounds and massive lintels. Some windows are sashes, and others are top-hung casements.	II
Milepost, New Road; 53.14282°N 1.65159°W		Late 18th century	The milepost is on the northwest side of New Road (B5056 road). It consists of a wedge-shaped stone with a rounded top. On the sides are inscribed the distances to Bakewell and Ashbourne.	II
Milepost southwest of Winstermoor Farm; 53.13080°N 1.64480°W		Late 18th century	The milepost is on the west side of the B5056 road. It consists of a wedge-shaped stone with a rounded top. On the sides are inscribed the distances to Bakewell and Ashbourne.	II
Stanfree House and adjoining house 53.14161°N 1.64070°W	—	Late 18th century	The houses are in gritstone with quoins on the east, a coved eaves band, and a Welsh slate roof. There are three storeys and two bays, and a chamfered corner with a corbel block on the east end. In the centre are two doorways, the left with a moulded surround and a keystone, and the other with a plain surround. The windows are sashes.	II
Stoneheath and adjoining house 53.14186°N 1.64220°W	—	Late 18th century	The houses are in gritstone with quoins, an eaves band, and a Welsh slate roof with coped gables and moulded kneelers. There are two storeys and two bays. The doorways have massive quoined surrounds and moulded flat canopies on stone brackets, and the windows are sashes.	II
The Old Brewhouse; 53.14160°N 1.64082°W	—	Late 18th century	The house is in gritstone with quoins, a floor band, coved eaves, and a Welsh slate roof with coped gables. There are three storeys and two bays. Steps lead up to the central doorway that has a heavy quoined surround and lintel. In the ground floor are shop windows with top hung lights, and the windows above are sashes.	II
Vernon House; 53.14187°N 1.63971°W	centrfe	Late 18th century	A house and cottage, later combined into a house, it is limestone with gritstone dressings, quoins, a moulded eaves band, and a roof of Welsh slate and stone slate with coped gables. There are three storeys and three bays. On the front are two doorways with quoined surrounds, and the windows are mullioned with two lights.	II
Pair of houses west of Vernon House; 53.14180°N 1.63992°W	—	Late 18th century	The houses are in limestone with gritstone dressings, quoins, and a Welsh slate roof with a coped east gable. There are two storeys and three bays. The doorways have massive quoined surrounds, and the windows are casements.	II
Pair of houses opposite Winster House; 53.14170°N 1.64197°W	—	Late 18th century	The houses are in limestone with gritstone dressings, quoins, and a tile roof with coped gables. There are three storeys and two bays. The doorways are paired in the centre, and have quoined surrounds and massive lintels, one with a rectangular fanlight. The windows are sashes.	II
Woodland View; 53.13918°N 1.64576°W	—	Late 18th century	The house is in limestone with gritstone dressings, and a Welsh slate roof with coped gables. There are two storeys and two bays. The central doorway has a quoined surround, and the windows are sashes.	II
The Headlands; 53.14101°N 1.63992°W	—	c. 1800	The house is in limestone, partly roughcast, with quoins, a floor band, a moulded eaves band, and a stone slate roof. There are two storeys and three bays. In the centre is a porch and a doorway with a moulded surround. The windows in the upper floor are sashes, and in the ground floor they have been replaced by casements.	II
Primitive Methodist Chapel; 53.14013°N 1.64222°W		1823	The chapel is in limestone with gritstone dressings, quoins, and a Welsh slate roof with coped gables. The entrance front is gabled, and contains two round-arched windows with keystones. Outside these are round-arched doorways with quoined surrounds, semicircular fanlights, and keystones. In the gable is an inscribed and dated plaque.	II
Cottage south of the Bowling Green Inn; 53.14119°N 1.64013°W	—	Early 19th century	Two cottages combined into one, it is in gritstone with quoins and a hipped tile roof. There are two storeys and two bays. On the front are two doorways with massive surrounds, one blocked, and the windows are sashes.	II
Gable End and adjoining house 53.14176°N 1.64075°W	—	Early 19th century	A pair of houses in limestone and gritstone, with gritstone dressings and coped gables. There are three storeys and four bays. The doorways have quoined surrounds, rectangular fanlights, and flat canopies on moulded brackets, and the windows are sashes.	II
Harness Room and Squire Whites; 53.14087°N 1.64376°W		Early 19th century	Two houses at right angles, one converted from a stable. They are in gritstone with quoins, coved eaves, roofs of stone slate and tile with coped gables and moulded kneelers, and two storeys. The house has two bays, a semicircular-headed doorway with a quoined surround and a semicircular hood. The ground floor windows have semicircular hoods and keystones, and in the upper floor are casement windows. The former stable contains two arched carriage openings, two doorways with quoins, semicircular hoods and keystones, and in the upper floor is an opening with a pointed arched head.	II
Marmalade Cottage; 53.14130°N 1.64039°W	—	Early 19th century	Four cottages later combined into two, they are in gritstone with quoins and roofs of Welsh slate and tile. There are two storeys and four bays. The ground floor windows are mullioned with hood moulds, the upper floor windows have single lights, and all have Gothic glazing. There are four doorways, two of which have been converted into windows, and all have hood moulds.	II
Rose Cottage, East Bank; 53.13999°N 1.63997°W	—	Early 19th century	The cottage is in limestone with gritstone dressings, quoins, and a stone slate roof with coped gables. There are two storeys and two bays. The doorway has a quoined surround and a rectangular fanlight, and the windows are sashes.	II
Bradley House; 53.14011°N 1.64115°W		c. 1830	The house is in limestone with gritstone dressings, quoins, and a Welsh slate roof with coped gables. There are two storeys and three bays. The central doorway has a heavily quoined surround and lintel, and the windows are sashes.	II
Methodist Schoolroom, railings and walls 53.14080°N 1.64311°W		1837	The schoolroom is in gritstone with quoins and a Welsh slate roof. There is a single storey and two bays. In the centre is a doorway with massive jambs, and a semicircular head with a keystone. This is flanked by Venetian windows, and above the doorway is an inscribed and dated plaque. In front of the schoolroom is a limestone boundary wall with chamfered copings and iron railings, containing plain gate piers with pyramidal caps and iron gates.	II
House south of Kirkby House; 53.14157°N 1.64254°W	—	Mid 19th century	The house is in gritstone with quoins, a moulded eaves cornice, and a tile roof with coped gables and moulded kneelers. There are two storeys, an L-shaped plan, and a front of three bays. The windows are sashes with hood moulds.	II
Telephone kiosk 53.14165°N 1.64116°W		1935	The K6 type telephone kiosk in Main Street was designed by Giles Gilbert Scott. Constructed in cast iron with a square plan and a dome, it has three unperforated crowns in the top panels.	II
