= Listed buildings in South Darley =

South Darley is a civil parish in the Derbyshire Dales district of Derbyshire, England. The parish contains nine listed buildings that are recorded in the National Heritage List for England. Of these, one is listed at Grade I, the highest of the three grades, and the others are at Grade II, the lowest grade. The parish contains the villages of Darley Bridge, Snitterton and Wensley, and the surrounding countryside. The listed buildings consist of houses and associated structures, a public house, a church, a milestone and a telephone kiosk.

== Key ==
Grade	Criteria
I	Buildings of exceptional interest, sometimes considered to be internationally important
II	Buildings of national importance and special interest

== Buildings ==
Name and location	Photograph	Date	Notes	Grade
Snitterton Manor Farmhouse; 53.14077°N 1.58247°W	—	16th century (probable)	This consists of part of a former manor house incorporated into a later farmhouse. It is in stone with a roof of tile and slate. There are two storeys, with a main range and a projecting gabled wing. The doorway has a plain surround, the windows in the older part are mullioned with hood moulds, and in the later part they are sashes.	II
Snitterton Hall; 53.13951°N 1.58507°W		Late 16th century	A large house in Elizabethan style that was later extended, it is in stone with a tile roof. There are two storeys and attics, and an E-shaped plan, consisting of a hall range and flanking gabled cross-wings, and with a lower northwest service range. The porch has Ionic fluted shafts, with carved balusters, between which is a frieze with flower and plant motifs. The windows are mullioned and transomed.	I
Wensley Hall; 53.14688°N 1.60633°W	—	Late 16th century	Two stone buildings later combined into one, the later part added in the 18th century. The early part has two storeys and two bays, and a slate roof with a coped gable and kneelers, and it contains a doorway with a moulded surround. The later part to the left has three storeys, two bays and a parapet. The windows in both parts are sashes in architraves.	II
Three Stags Heads Public House; 53.15418°N 1.59815°W		1736	The public house, which was extended later in the 17th century, is in stone, and has a slate roof with a coped west gable. There are two storeys and an attic in the gabled bay, and four bays. On the front are two doorways with hood moulds, one with a painted surround, the other with a massive quoined surround. The windows are sashes, some with mullions.	II
Potters Cottage; 53.15444°N 1.59809°W		1763	The house is in gritstone with quoins, and a tile roof with coped gables and kneelers. There are two storeys, the main part has two bays, and there is a long wing to the right. In the centre of the main part is a doorway with a flat hood on consoles. Over the doorway is an inscribed and dated plaque, and the windows are mullioned with two lights. The windows in the wing have been altered.	II
St Mary's Church; 53.14996°N 1.60113°W		1845	The church was enlarged in 1880 and 1885, and is in Neo-Romanesque style. It is in gritstone with a Welsh slate roof, and consists of a nave with a vestry to the north, a sanctuary with a parish room beneath, and a west tower. The tower is narrow with three stages, clasping buttresses, and a semicircular-ached west doorway, over which is a panel of blind intersecting arcading and a clock face. In the middle stage are triple lancet windows with semicircular-arched heads, and the top stage has a wide semicircular arch containing bell openings, and at the top is a pyramidal roof. Along the nave are lancet windows with semicircular heads.	II
Telephone kiosk 53.14637°N 1.60740°W		1935	The K6 type telephone kiosk opposite the Crown Inn in Wensley was designed by Giles Gilbert Scott. Constructed in cast iron with a square plan and a dome, it has three unperforated crowns in the top panels.	II
Milestone; 53.13979°N 1.58297°W		Undated	The milestone on the south side of Snitterton Road, Snitterton, consists of a tall rough-cut stone inscribed with the distances to London and Nottingham.	II
Garden walls, Snitterton Hall; 53.13926°N 1.58498°W		Undated	The walls enclosing the grounds of the hall are in stone. On the south side it includes a large round-headed arch with a moulded surround. To the left is a summer house with a single-storey and a hipped stone slate roof.	II
