= Whitworth Institute =

Building in Darley Dale, Derbyshire, England

The Whitworth Institute
- Interactive map of the The Whitworth Institute area

General information
- Architectural style: Free Tudor
- Coordinates: 53°09′45.07″N 1°35′26.15″W
- Groundbreaking: 1889
- Estimated completion: 1890

The Whitworth Institute is a Grade II listed building in Darley Dale, Derbyshire.

It was funded by the estate of the late Sir Joseph Whitworth who lived in nearby Stancliffe Hall. The building is constructed of Staincliffe stone with green Westmorland slate. By the end of May 1890 the builders had finished work, and the joiners had moved into the interior. The building cost about £15,000 (equivalent to £1,670,000 in 2025). and although completed by September 1890, was not formally opened until May 1891. It contained a large reading room, a billiard room, a smoke room and playroom on the east side, a small reading room on the west and a swimming bath 54 feet (16 m) by 22 feet (6.7 m). Upstairs there were two further reading rooms, and a large hall 60 feet (18 m) long and 30 feet (9.1 m) wide capable of seating 200 people.

The Whitworth Institute was given to the people of Darley Dale and in 2009/10 underwent a £1.7m renovation to ensure its continued use for future generations.

== See also ==
- Listed buildings in Darley Dale
