= Darwin Forest Country Park =

Wooded holiday camp in Derbyshire, England

Coordinates: 53.184°N 1.551°W

Darwin Forest

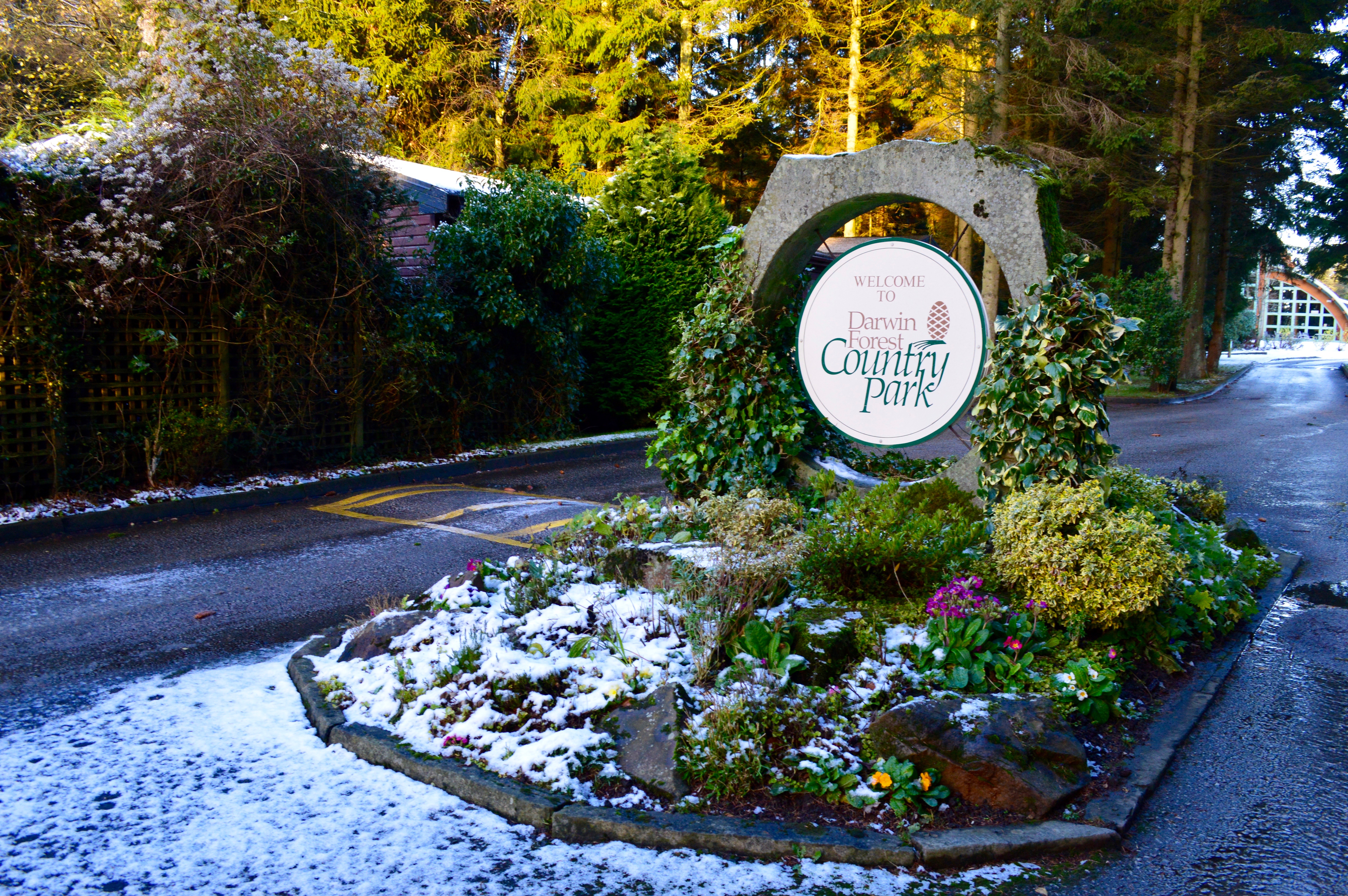
- Company type: Private
- Industry: Hospitality and leisure
- Founded: November 28, 1985; 40 years ago
- Headquarters: Darley Moor, Darley Dale, United Kingdom
- Number of locations: 2
- Key people: Nicholas Grayson; Lyndsey Grayson; Beverley Grayson; Mark Randall
- Services: Short breaks; Family holidays; Leisure activities
- Revenue: ▲£11.4 million (2022); £8.5 million (2021)
- Operating income: £4.24 million (2022); £4.18 million (2021)
- Net income: £3.349 million (2022); £3.379 million (2021)
- Total assets: ▲£10.8 million (2022); £8.9 million (2021)
- Owner: Pinelodge Holidays Ltd
- Number of employees: 220 (2022); 217 (2021)
- Parent: Landal Greenparks
- Website: darwinforest.co.uk

Darwin Forest is a 47-acre (19 ha) holiday resort near Matlock in Derbyshire, England, operated by the Grayson family. The resort contains 137 luxury lodges produced by sister company Pinelog (part of the Pinelog Group). The park also includes a swimming pool and gym, a bar and restaurant, an onsite convenience store (Woodland Store) and Little Monkey's children's play centre. Nearby in Ashbourne is the smaller sister resort Sandybrook Lodges. Darwin Forest and Sandybrook operate as Pinelodge Holidays Ltd and alongside Pinelog Ltd form the Pinelog Group.

The resort is located off the B5057 on Darley Moor, near Darley Dale, in the Derbyshire Dales and is 5 mi (8 km) south-east from Chatsworth House and Haddon Hall. The country park has received the David Bellamy Gold Award and the Hoseasons 'Best lodge park in Britain' accolade.
