= Whitworth Hospital, Matlock =

Whitworth Hospital
- Derbyshire Community Health Services NHS Foundation Trust
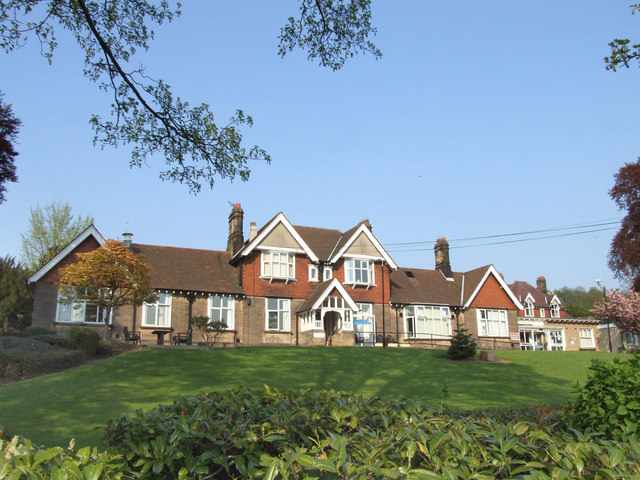
- Whitworth Hospital

- Location in Derbyshire

Geography
- Location: Bakewell Road, Matlock, Derbyshire, England
- Coordinates: 53.1503°N 1.5730°W

Organisation
- Care system: NHS
- Type: Community

History
- Founded: 1889

Links
- Website: www.dchs.nhs.uk

Whitworth Hospital is a healthcare facility on Bakewell Road between Darley Dale and Matlock in Derbyshire, England. It is managed by Derbyshire Community Health Services NHS Foundation Trust.

== History ==
The facility, which was founded by Lady Louisa Whitworth in memory of her husband Sir Joseph Whitworth, opened as the Whitworth Cottage Hospital in 1889. It briefly closed in 1897 and was re-opened by the Duchess of Devonshire as the "Endowed Whitworth General and Infectious Hospitals (gifts to Darley district)" in 1898. It joined the National Health Service as the Whitworth Hospital in 1948. In January 2019 it was announced that the rehabilitation ward at the hospital, which had faced closure, would be retained.
