= Nutation (engineering) =

Type of motion in engineering

In engineering, a nutating motion is similar to that seen in a swashplate mechanism. In general, a nutating plate is carried on a skewed bearing on the main shaft and does not itself rotate, whereas a swashplate is fixed to the shaft and rotates with it. The motion is similar to the motions of coin or a tire wobbling on the ground after being dropped with the flat side down. Precession is the physical term for this kind of motion.

Nutating mixers are used in gentle three-dimensional (gyrating) agitation of chemical or biological scientific procedures by repetitively moving the vessels holding the liquids.

The nutating motion is widely employed in flowmeters and pumps. The displacement of volume for one revolution is first determined. The speed of the device in revolutions per unit time is measured. In the case of flowmeters, the product of the rotational speed and the displacement per revolution is then taken to find the flow rate.

A nutating disc engine was patented in 1993 and a prototype was reported in 2006. The engine consisted of an internal disk wobbling on a Z-shaped shaft. Nutation has also been used in drive systems for gearboxes, with proposed uses including helicopter rotors, seat recliners and a European Space Agency probe to Mercury.
