= Dakeyne hydraulic disc engine =

High pressure hydraulic engine in England

The Dakeyne hydraulic disc engine was a high-pressure hydraulic engine built in the 19th century to power a flax mill in Ladygrove, Derbyshire, England.

== History ==
In the 1820s mill owners Edward and James Dakeyne designed and constructed a disc engine known locally as "The Romping Lion" to make use of the high-pressure water available near their mill. The Dakeyne brothers had previously invented "The Equalinium", a machine for the preparation of flax for spinning, and their father Daniel Dakeyne (1733–1819) was granted a patent for this device in 1794. It is often said that Edward and James did not take out the patent themselves because they were minors at the time, but in fact they were 23 and 21 respectively.

Little is known of their engine other than from the somewhat unclear description accompanying the patent, which was granted in 1830. Its main castings were made at the Morley Park foundry near Heage, and it weighed 7 tons and generated 35 horsepower at a head of 96 feet of water. Stephen Glover, in his gazetteer of Derbyshire, was enthusiastic about the prospects for the disc engine, foreseeing its use in all manner of applications, domestic as well as industrial, not only as a prime mover but also as a pump. He stated that John Dakeyne had also commissioned a disc engine to drive the bellows of an organ in the family's residence, Knabb House. A larger model was constructed to drain lead mines at Alport near Youlgreave and many steam versions were subsequently built by other people.

The machine itself is difficult to describe. Frank Nixon, in his book The Industrial Archaeology of Derbyshire (1969), commented that:

The most striking characteristic of this ingenious machine is perhaps the difficulty experienced by those trying to describe it; the patentees and Stephen Glover only succeeded in producing descriptions of monumental incomprehensibility.

== See also ==
- Nutating disc engine
