= Darley Bridge =

Village in Derbyshire, England

Coordinates: 53.1547°N 1.5975°W

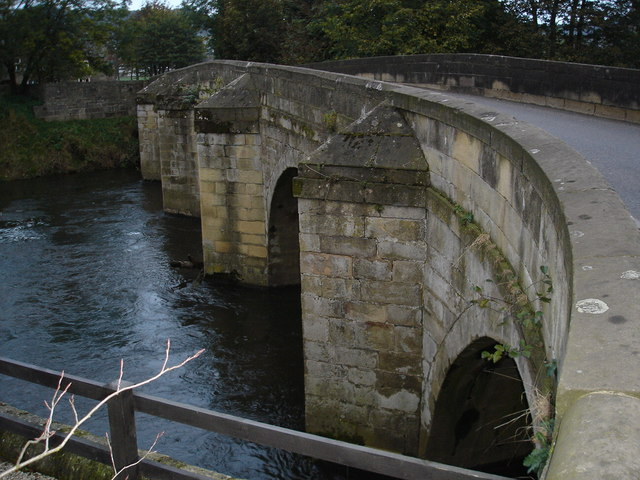
- Darley Bridge

- Location within Derbyshire
- Civil parish: South Darley
- District: Derbyshire Dales
- Shire county: Derbyshire
- Region: East Midlands
- Country: England
- Sovereign state: United Kingdom
- Post town: MATLOCK
- Postcode district: DE4
- Dialling code: 01629
- Police: Derbyshire
- Fire: Derbyshire
- Ambulance: East Midlands

Darley Bridge is a village in Derbyshire, located in South Darley parish in the Derbyshire Dales, bordering the Peak District. The village lies at the bottom of the hill below Wensley where the road crosses the River Derwent. A grade II* listed stone bridge spans the river and links the village with Darley Dale. Close to the bridge, the road winds between terraced stone houses in the oldest part of the village. The only public house in the parish, The Three Stags Heads, is in this area.

The village extends back up the hill with more recent houses, including a substantial line of semi-detached properties and Ivonbrook care home. At the upper end, known as Cross Green, there is the parish church (grade II listed) of St Mary the Virgin, South Darley Church of England Primary School, South Darley Village Hall and Cross Green Plantation.

The nearest train station is Darley Dale railway station, opened in 1849. This is now a heritage line with diesel and steam trains run by Peak Rail, with a connection to the main railway network at Matlock Station. The 172 bus route of Hulleys of Baslow runs from Bakewell to Matlock, via Wensley, Darley Bridge and Darley Dale.

== History ==
The bridge dates back to the 15th century and features two pointed arches, and three semi-circular arches.

== See also ==
- Listed buildings in South Darley
