= Darley Dale =

Town in Derbyshire, England

Coordinates: 53.166°N 1.596°W

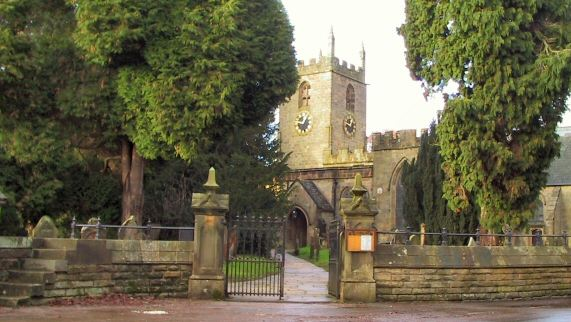
- St. Helen's Church, Darley Dale

- Location within Derbyshire
- Population: 5,413 (Including Hackney. 2011)
- OS grid reference: SK270632
- Civil parish: Darley Dale
- District: Derbyshire Dales
- Shire county: Derbyshire
- Region: East Midlands
- Country: England
- Sovereign state: United Kingdom
- Post town: MATLOCK
- Postcode district: DE4
- Dialling code: 01629
- Police: Derbyshire
- Fire: Derbyshire
- Ambulance: East Midlands
- UK Parliament: Derbyshire Dales

Darley Dale, formerly Darley, is a town and civil parish in the Derbyshire Dales district of Derbyshire, England, with a population of 5,413. It lies north of Matlock, on the River Derwent and the A6 road. The town forms part of a built-up area with both Matlock and Rowsley.

== Geography ==
This article contains information on the area covered by the current civil parish of Darley Dale. The main built-up area of the parish extends for 2 miles along the A6 road north-west of Matlock, starting near the ARC Leisure Centre and ending near Stancliffe Quarry. It is bounded on the south-west by the River Derwent and extends over the hills and moors to the north-east as far as Darwin Forest Country Park.

The parish includes the settlements at Darley Dale, Darley Hillside, Churchtown, Two Dales (Toadhole), Upper Hackney and Farley, but excludes Darley Bridge and Northwood. Darley Dale is sometimes confused with Darley Abbey (a mile north of Derby and with Dale Abbey (6 miles north-east of Derby).

== History ==
- The name Darley derives from the Old English dēorlēah meaning 'animal wood or clearing'.
- Earlier versions of this article claimed that a Benedictine abbey was built in Darley under the reign of Henry I in the 12th century – this is not supported by the evidence now available.
- St Helen's Church dates from the 12th century.
- Darley Bridge survives from the late medieval period, having been built in the 15th century.
- The Wirksworth Moor to Longstone turnpike opened in 1759.
- The Chesterfield to Matlock, Darley and Rowsley Bridge turnpike opened in 1760.
- In 1849 a railway line opened for passenger traffic between Ambergate and Rowsley, with intermediate stations at Matlock Bath, Matlock Bridge and Darley (Dale).
- In 1873 a new railway station opened at Darley on opposite side of level crossing.
- In 1877 Rowsley railway sidings brought into use.
- St Helen's Church was restored in 1877.
- Whitworth Hospital opened in 1889.
- Whitworth Institute was erected in 1890.
- In 1890 Darley railway station officially re-named Darley Dale.
- Around the same time "Toadhole" also became "Two Dales".
- The town grew in the 19th and 20th centuries around the lead mining, metal forging, railway and quarrying industries.

== Places of worship ==
=== St Helen's Church ===
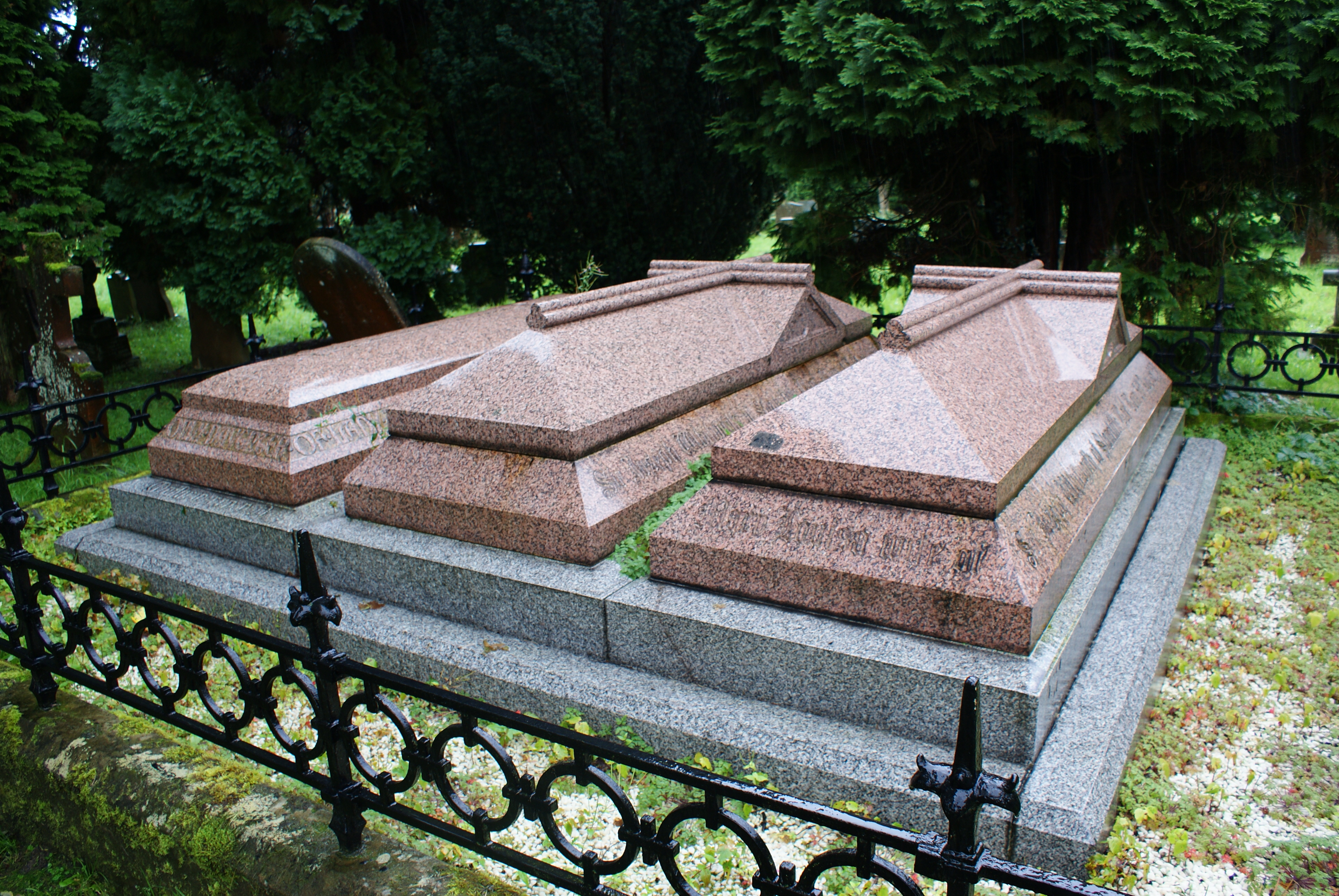
Grave of Sir Joseph Whitworth, in the grounds of St Helen's Parish Church (Whitworth's grave is the central tomb)

Situated in the Churchtown part of Darley Dale, this Grade II* listed parish church dates from the 12th century. The church was restored in 1877, and the tower was restored and strengthened in 1902–03. Outside the church, in the south wall of the chancel, the four periods of architecture, Norman, Early English, Decorated and Perpendicular, can be seen. Inside the church, there are monuments to Sir John de Darley who was lord of the manor in 14th century. There is also a memorial window to the famous engineer Sir Joseph Whitworth, who lived in the parish and is buried in the churchyard. The yew tree just outside the south porch is claimed to be 2,000 years old and is one of the thickest in England, with a girth of around 33 feet, 4 feet from the ground. It is claimed that this tree marked a sacred site in pre-Christian times.

=== Wesleyan Methodist Chapel ===
Situated on Chesterfield Road in Two Dales, this was built in 1827. Formally known as Hudson's Chapel, it is now called The Old Chapel and was superseded by the Dale Road Methodist Church in 1906. After use as a Sunday school, it was converted into a bakery. Before conversion to a residential dwelling, the property was used by a local builder as storage unit.

=== Hackney Primitive Methodist Chapel ===
Situated on Greenaway Lane, this was built in 1848 and was superseded by the nearby Hackney Methodist Church in 1908. After a period as a Sunday school, it is no longer used as a place of worship.

=== Dale Road Methodist Church ===
Situated on Dale Road, close to the Whitworth Institute, this was built in 1904. It superseded the Wesleyan Chapel in Two Dales.

=== Hackney Methodist Church ===
Hackney Methodist Church

This was built in 1908 to replace a smaller Primitive Methodist chapel nearby on Greenaway Lane. It is now a private residence.

=== Darley Hillside Methodist Church ===
The church was built on Moor Lane in 1912 to replace an earlier building on Lumb Lane. It was part of the same circuit as Dale Road Methodist Church, but is now closed and converted into a community centre.

== Whitworth legacy ==
Whitworth Hospital

Whitworth Institute

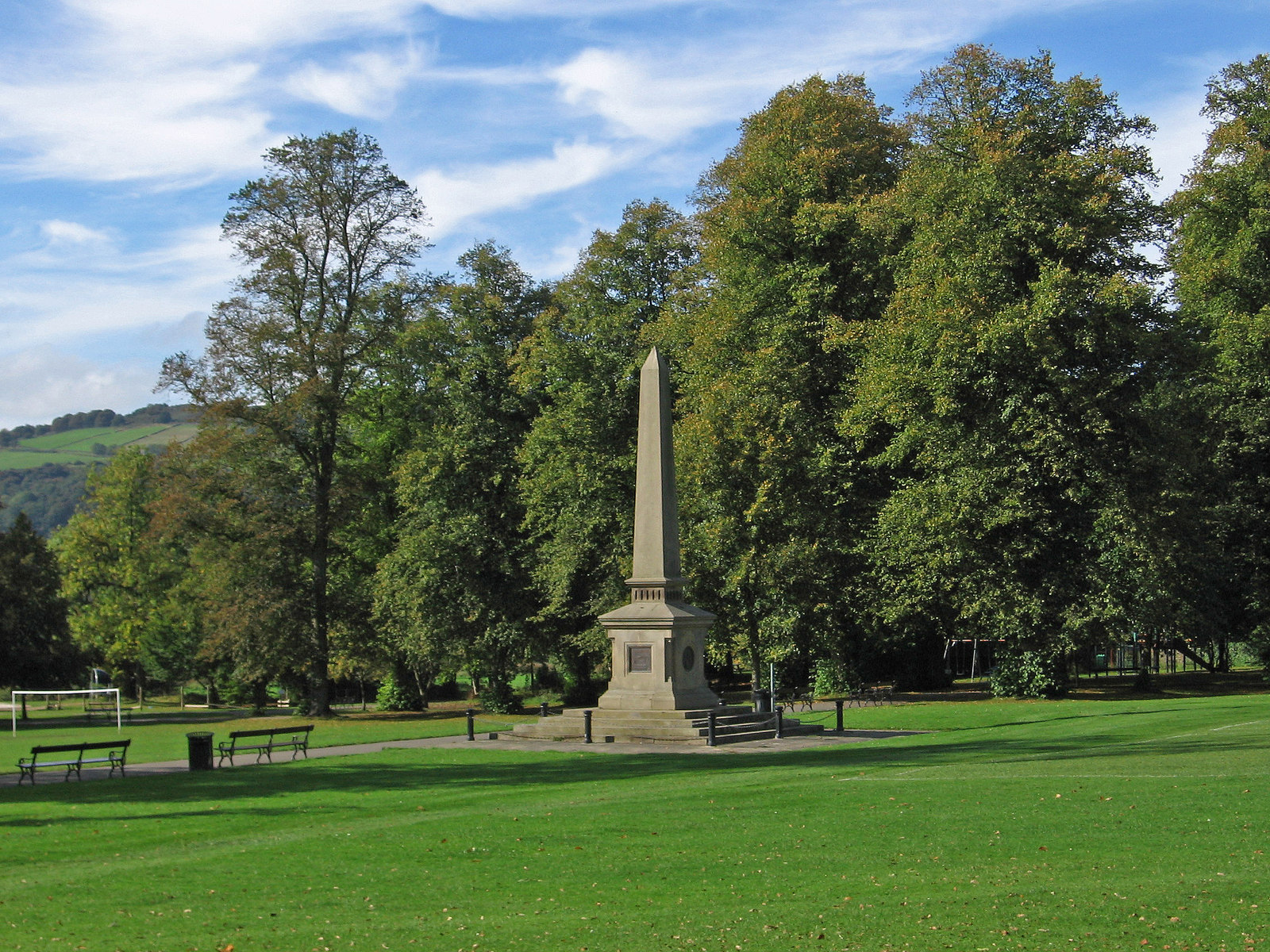
Whitworth Park

Whitworth Hotel

Sir Joseph Whitworth, the 19th-century machine toolmaker and engineer, lived at Stancliffe Hall in Darley Dale for the last 13 years of his life. He died in Monte Carlo in 1887, aged 83, and was buried at St. Helen's Church. During his lifetime he drew up plans for the village and these were fulfilled thanks to generous endowments from his estate. He had, according to his biographer Terence Kilburn, hoped to build a comprehensive village college but his wife, Louisa, preferred a social centre. The Institute and Park was a compromise and is just one of the things the Whitworths did to enrich the lives of Darley Dale's inhabitants.

=== Whitworth Hospital ===
Lady Louisa Whitworth built Whitworth Cottage Hospital, the first of two major building projects in Darley Dale, following the death of her husband and it was opened in 1889. It is still in use as an NHS hospital today, providing a minor injuries unit, two urgent care wards and some community health services.

=== Whitworth Institute ===
The opening to the public of the Whitworth Institute in September 1890 marked the beginning of Lady Louisa's second major project in Darley Dale. The institute comprised an indoor swimming pool, an assembly hall, various reading and committee rooms and eventually a library, a billiard room, a museum of natural history, a convenient hotel (Whitworth Hotel, now "Barrington's") and a landscaped park. The Whitworth Institute was given to the people of Darley Dale and in 2009/10 underwent a £1.7 million renovation to ensure its continued use for future generations.

=== Whitworth Park ===
The park provides a variety of sporting activities with association football and cricket pitches, a bowling green and a skateboard arena. Whitworth Park also provides over ten acres of landscaped grounds with pathways along tree-lined avenues. There is also a shallow lake. The centrepiece of the park is an obelisk commemorating Sir Joseph Whitworth. In 2003 the park was the subject of a £750,000 refurbishment.

== Notable people ==
Notable people associated with Darley Dale include:

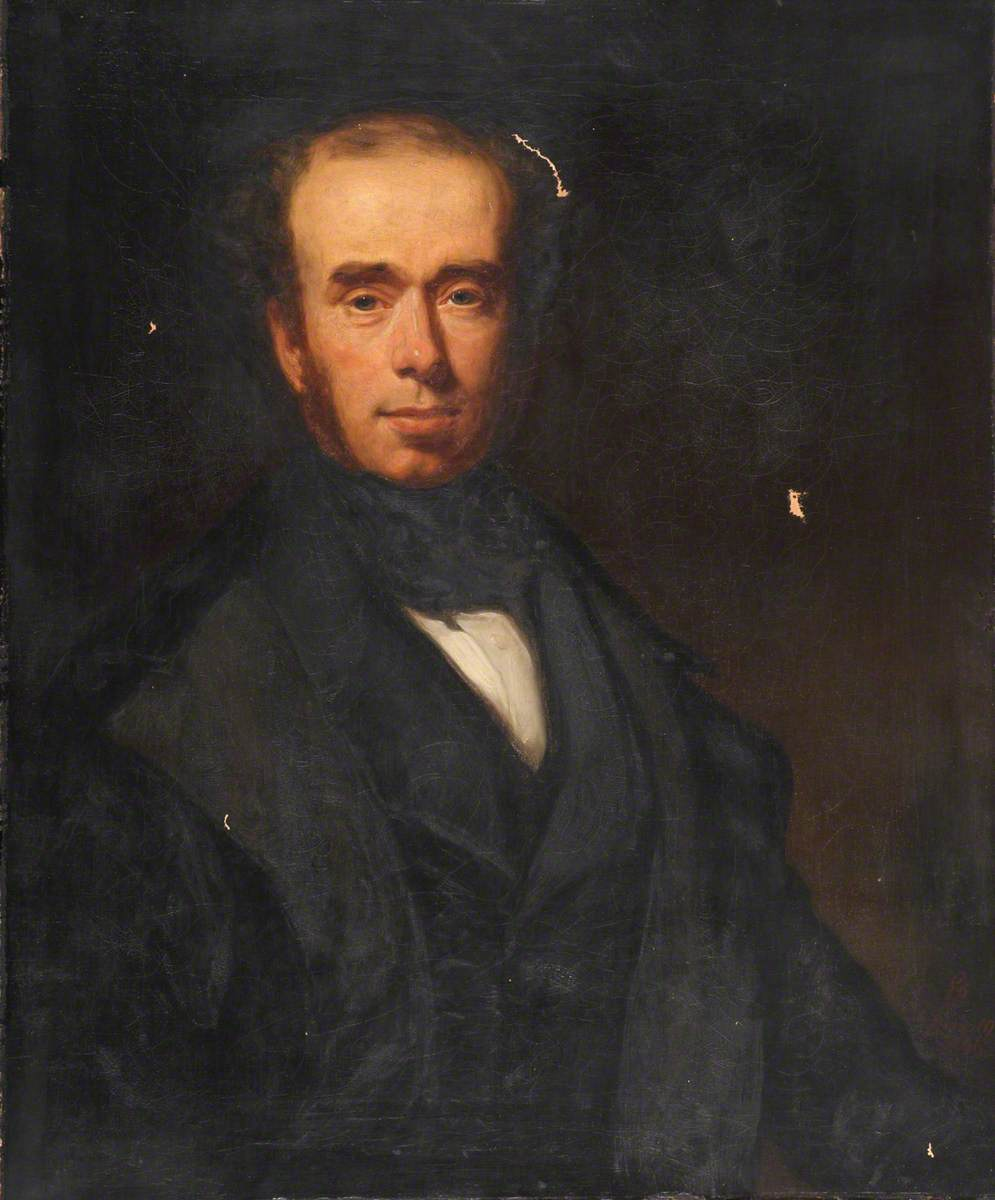
Joseph Whitworth, 1846

- Sir Godfrey de Foljambe (1317–1376), politician and judge, and the local landowner.
- George Nedham (died 1584) entrepreneur and prospector worked on copper mining at Keswick, Cumbria
- Anthony Alsop (c. 1670 - 1726), clergyman and Neo-Latin poet
- Sir Joseph Whitworth (1803–1887), engineer, entrepreneur, inventor and philanthropist, see the Whitworth legacy section above
- Joseph Paxton (1803–1865), architect and gardener for the nearby Chatsworth House also an MP.
- Edward Milner (1819 – 1884), a landscape architect.
- Crichton Porteous (1901–1991), author of books, articles and short stories
- Timothy Yeats (1935–2016), theologian, was the vicar of St Helen's, 1979–1990
- Kit Green (born c. 1968), comedy writer and performer, grew up there
- Tom Chambers (born 1977), actor, played Sam Strachan in Holby City

=== Sport ===
- Mike Hendrick (1948–2021), cricketer, played 267 First-class games for Nottinghamshire and Derbyshire and 30 Test cricket games
- Roger Finney (born 1960) cricketer, played 212 First-class cricket matches for Derbyshire
- Nigel Bond (born 1965), snooker player, was born there

== Notable buildings and attractions ==
The town was the winner of the 2003 Britain in Bloom, in the category of 'Large Village' The prize was presented by local marine expert Ben Goodwin.

A biennial arts festival, the Darley Dale Arts Festival, is held in July in odd-numbered years.

At the bottom of Station Road lies Darley Dale railway station. National rail services ceased in the 1960s however the station is now occupied by the railway and heritage preservation group Peak Rail. From there, a heritage steam service operates south to Matlock and north to Rowsley South, with a route distance of approximately five miles.

An annual transport festival, the Darley Dale Festival of Transport, is held at the bottom of Station Road every September.

Nearby is the holiday resort Darwin Forest Country Park.

The Square & Compass public house on Station Road is home to an annual music festival, the Ale House Rocks Music Festival.

== Media ==
Local news and television programmes are provided by BBC East Midlands and ITV Central. Television signals can be received from one of the three local relay transmitters (Darley Dale, Matlock and Stanton Moor).

Local radio stations are BBC Radio Derby on 95.3 FM, Capital Midlands on 102.8 FM and Greatest Hits Radio Yorkshire (formerly Peak FM) on 102.0 FM.

The town is served by these local newspapers: Matlock Mercury, Buxton Advertiser and Derbyshire Times.

== Two Dales (Toadhole) ==
Two Dales was called "Toadhole" until the late 19th century; the name was changed at the suggestion of the parish vicar, who felt it would help with the promotion of tourism, as with the adding of "Dale" to Darley.

Ladygrove Mill was built in Two Dales for spinning cotton by Abraham Flint, but converted to flax spinning in 1789 by Daniel Dakeyne of Knabb House. It was expanded by his sons, Edward and James, who built a series of three dams on the Sydnope Valley rising to 96 feet. To cope with the water pressure, they invented a revolutionary water-pressure powered "disc engine", which they patented in 1830 as the Dakeyne hydraulic disc engine. It was the progenitor of a type, now known as a "nutating disc engine" (which has been the subject of entrepreneurial interest in the 21st century). The mills and equipment have virtually disappeared but the remains of the dams can still be seen.

The Plough Inn public house in Two Dales was the reason behind former England international footballer Eddie Shimwell's transfer from Sheffield United to Blackpool in December 1946. Shimwell wanted to buy the pub, but Sheffield United would not allow it because of their ban on players becoming publicans, so the full-back put in a transfer request.

== Transport ==
Buses are run by Stagecoach Yorkshire, Trentbarton, High Peak and Andrew's of Tideswell.

== See also ==
- Listed buildings in Darley Dale
