= St Mary the Virgin's Church, South Darley =

St Mary the Virgin’s Church, South Darley
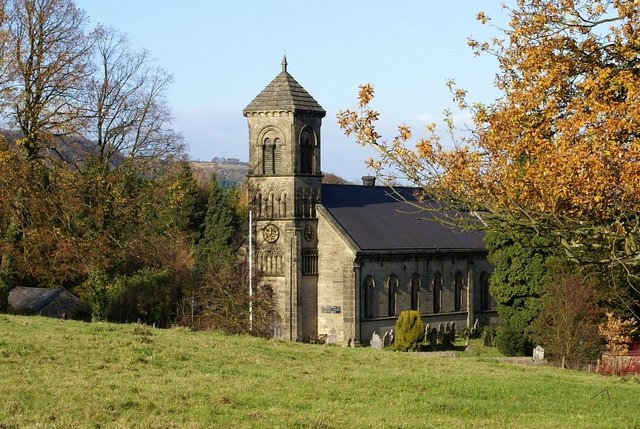
- St Mary the Virgin’s Church, South Darley
- St Mary the Virgin’s Church, South Darley
- 53°08′59.91″N 1°36′8.02″W
- OS grid reference: SK 26771 61495
- Location: South Darley
- Country: England
- Denomination: Church of England

History
- Dedication: St Mary
- Consecrated: 19 June 1845

Architecture
- Heritage designation: Grade II listed
- Architect: Joseph Mitchell
- Completed: 1845

Administration
- Diocese: Diocese of Derby
- Archdeaconry: Chesterfield
- Deanery: Wirksworth
- Parish: South Darley

Clergy
- Rector: Stephen Monk

St Mary the Virgin's Church, South Darley is a Grade II listed parish church in the Church of England in South Darley, Derbyshire. At the entrance to the churchyard is a memorial to the men from the parish who died in the two world wars.

== History ==
The church was built in 1845 by the Sheffield architect Joseph Mitchell. It was consecrated on 19 June 1845 Further additions were made in 1880 and 1885 to 1886. The changes in 1885 included the re-enlargement of the chancel, extending it by 27 ft in length. The floor of the chancel was laid with encaustic tiles by Maw and Son of Bentall, Staffordshire. This building is possibly based on the design of the protestant Reformed Church of Troyes in Normandy, France.

== Parish status ==
The church is in a joint parish with:

- St John the Baptist's Church, Winster
- St Helen's Church, Darley Dale

== Churchyard ==
Derbyshire Family History Society transcribed all inscriptions on gravestones and other memorials in 1993 and published this as: Transcript of the Memorial Inscriptions in the Church and Churchyard of St. Mary the Virgin in the Parish of South Darley (Darley Dale) and in the County of Derby. A copy is held by the church. Churchyard records have been updated with burials since 1993.

== Organ ==
The church contains a pipe organ by Wadsworth. A specification of the organ can be found on the National Pipe Organ Register.

== Present day ==
Services are currently held on a rota basis sharing with the other churches in the Parish.

== See also ==
- Listed buildings in South Darley
