= Winster =

Village in the Derbyshire Dales, England

Coordinates: 53.1419°N 1.6399°W

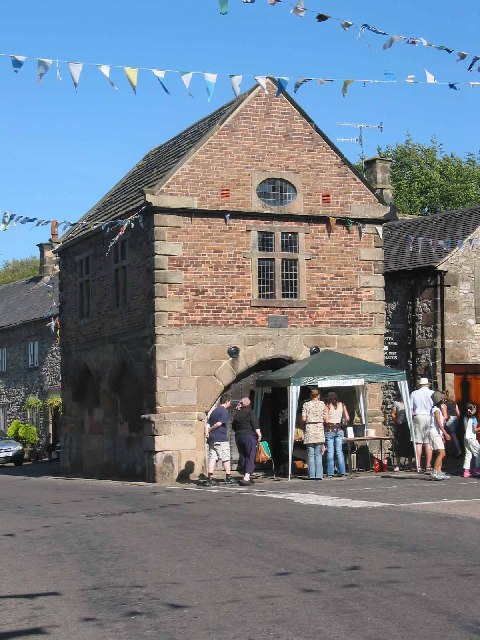
- The Market House, Winster in 2005 during the village’s Secret Gardens event

- Location within Derbyshire
- Population: 600 (2011)
- OS grid reference: SK241605
- Civil parish: Winster
- District: Derbyshire Dales
- Shire county: Derbyshire
- Region: East Midlands
- Country: England
- Sovereign state: United Kingdom
- Post town: MATLOCK
- Postcode district: DE4
- Dialling code: 01629
- Police: Derbyshire
- Fire: Derbyshire
- Ambulance: East Midlands
- UK Parliament: Derbyshire Dales

Winster is a village and civil parish in the Derbyshire Dales district, in Derbyshire, England, about 5 miles (8 km) from Matlock and 6 miles (10 km) from Bakewell at an altitude of approximately 820 feet (250 m). It was formerly a centre for the lead mining industry. The village lies within the Peak District National Park and The Peak District Boundary Walk runs through the village.

== History ==
Winster has many listed buildings, including Winster Market House which was acquired by the National Trust in 1906. The 2021 census shows a population of 551, down from 633 in 2001 and 600 in 2011. The village has a primary school, two churches, two pubs, a village hall (The Burton Institute) and a village shop (owned by the community) which includes a post office. Winster was mentioned in Domesday Book in 1086 when it was owned by Henry de Ferrers.

A workhouse at Bank Top (grid reference SK239602) was opened in 1744. It had a rule that forbade any relief outside of the workhouse. By the 1770s it could house 40 inmates.

== Winster Wakes ==
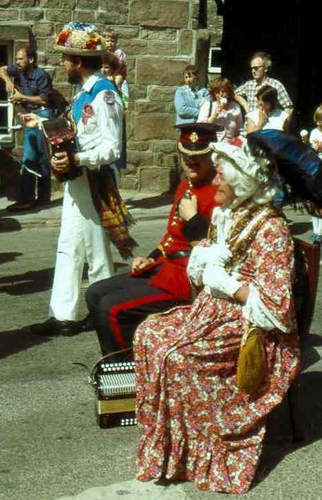
The Winster King and Queen tour with the Morris men

Winster's parish church is the Church of St John the Baptist, and a week-long annual carnival called Winster Wakes starts on the first Sunday on or after 24 June (the patronal day of St John the Baptist). Main Street is closed briefly on the Sunday for the Wakes Parade, and for much of the following Saturday afternoon, when there are stalls and entertainment (including Morris Dancing) in the street.

== Fatal duel ==
As reported in The Times (London) on 2 June 1821, a local surgeon, William Cuddie, was courting Mary, the daughter of the wealthy Brittlebank family of Oddo House in Winster. In May 1821 one of her brothers, William Brittlebank, tried to end their association. On the evening of 21 May Cuddie and Brittlebank quarreled violently. The doctor later received a note:

Sir, I expect satisfaction for the insult you dared to offer me at a time when you knew that my situation with a helpless Woman prevented my chastising you. Name your time and place, the bearer will wait for an answer. Yours William Brittlebank, Junior. I shall be attended by a friend and prepared with pistols, and if you don’t meet I shall post you as a coward.

Cuddie refused to reply to the letter. The following afternoon three of the Brittlebank brothers and a mutual friend, Edmund Spencer, arrived in his garden at Bank House with two loaded pistols. Cuddie reluctantly accepted one of the weapons. William Brittlebank walked 15 yards (14 m) away, turned and fired. Two shots were heard but only Cuddie was hit. He died a few hours later.

Two of the Brittlebanks (Francis and Andrew) were tried in Derby in August 1821, but were found not guilty of murder, while their brother William fled with a £100 reward on his head. It is thought that he went to Australia but evidence is lacking.

== See also ==
- Listed buildings in Winster

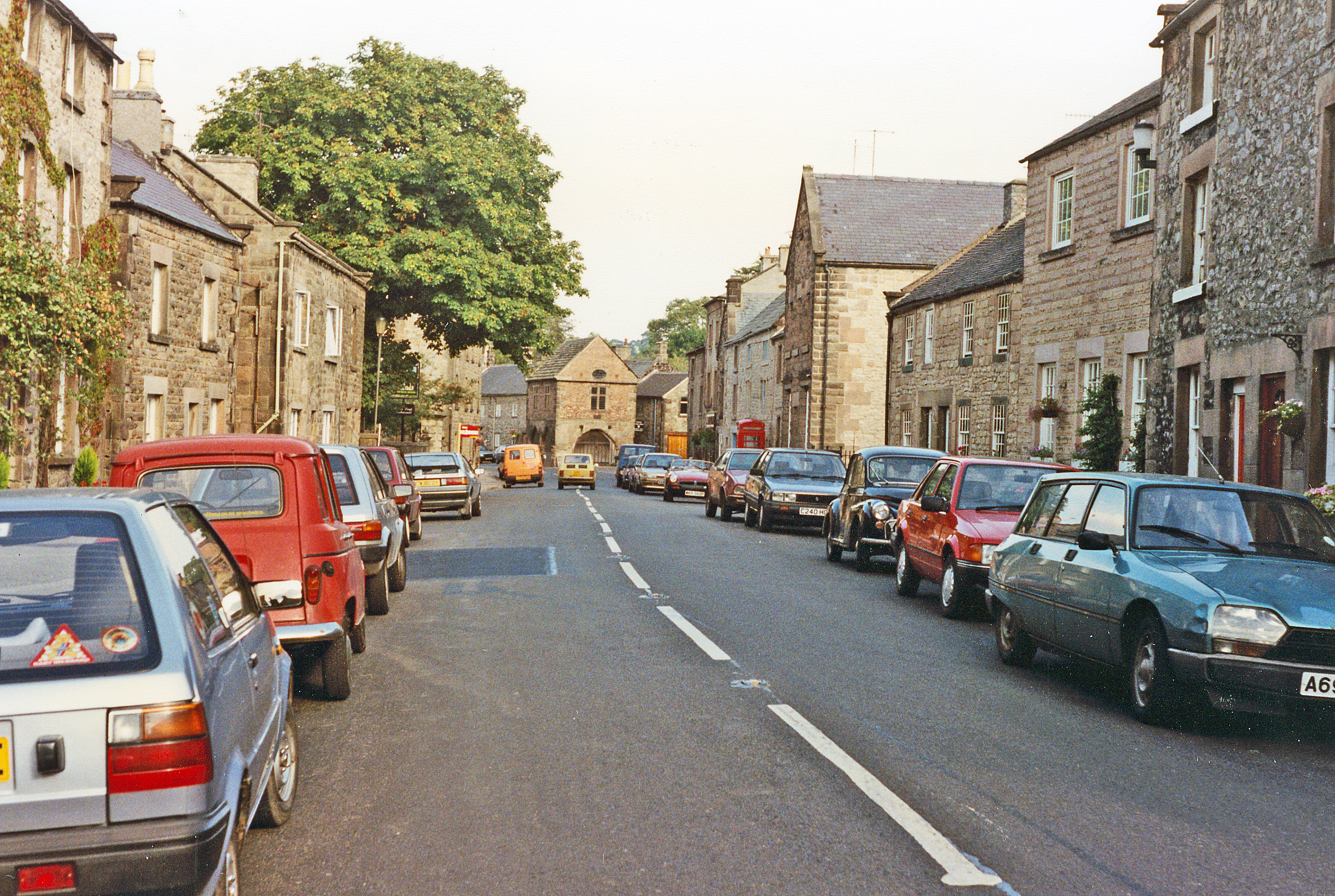
Main Street, Winster
