= Scarcliffe =

Village in Derbyshire, England

Coordinates: 53.213°N 1.260°W

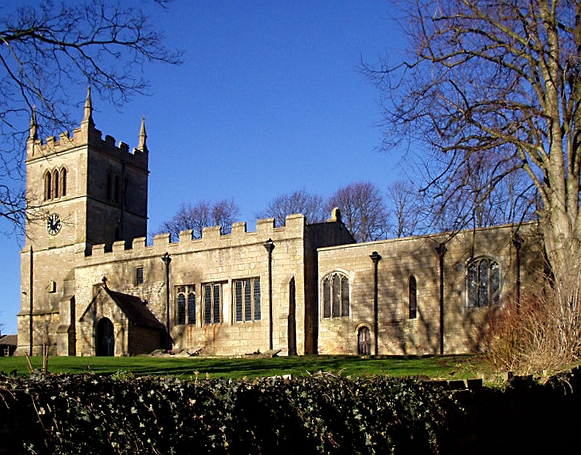
- St Leonard's Church, Scarcliffe

- Location within Derbyshire
- Population: 5,288 (2011)
- OS grid reference: SK495686
- Civil parish: Scarcliffe
- District: Bolsover
- Shire county: Derbyshire
- Region: East Midlands
- Country: England
- Sovereign state: United Kingdom
- Post town: Chesterfield
- Postcode district: S44
- Dialling code: 01246
- Police: Derbyshire
- Fire: Derbyshire
- Ambulance: East Midlands
- UK Parliament: North East Derbyshire

Scarcliffe is a village and civil parish in the Bolsover district of Derbyshire, England. It is sometimes called Scarcliffe with Palterton. The population of the parish (including the hamlets of Palterton, Rylah, Stockley, and parts of Stony Houghton and Hillstown (Bolsover)) at the 2001 UK Census was 5,211, increasing to 5,288 at the 2011 Census.

== Location ==
About two miles (3 km) SSE of Bolsover, the village's main street is the B6417 road between Clowne and New Houghton, which connects at Scarcliffe to the A617 between Mansfield and Chesterfield. Other nearby settlements include Clay Cross, Matlock, Shirebrook, Warsop, North Wingfield, Tupton, Pilsley and Ashover.

Scarcliffe is within a few miles of Junction 29 of the M1 motorway.

Palterton is a hamlet within the parish, one mile (1.6 km) to the west of the main village. In the early 20th century it had both a school and a post office. It still has a school now, however the post office is no longer in use.

Palterton is recorded in 1086 in the Domesday Book under the land of Ralph Fitzhubert.

In Palterton and Scarcliffe and "Tunstall" (in Ault Hucknall Lefnoth had six carucates of land and two bovates to the geld with l;and for eight ploughs. There are two ploughs in demesne and ten villans and one sokeman and two bordars having three ploughs and another tenant paying rent with another plough. There is a mill giving four shillings and eight acres of meadow and woodland pasture one league long by half a league wide. TRE worth about six pounds now fifty shillings. Reynard holds it.

To the east of the main village are two areas of woodland, Langwith Wood and Roseland Wood.

== Facilities ==
Both Scarcliffe and Palterton have its own primary school, which takes children between the ages of four and eleven and has some 80 places. There are two pubs in Scarcliffe ('The Elm Tree' and 'The Horse and Groom') and the 'Palterton Miner's Welfare' in Palterton, but no shop in the hamlet or village.

== Church ==
The most notable building is the Norman parish church of St Leonard, which is a Grade II* listed building. It contains a handsome marble monument, dating to the 13th century, of a Lady Constantia, who holds a child in her arms. A stone tympanum over an ancient door is carved with geometrical patterns, and there is a medieval piscina. The oak parish chest is almost ten feet long. The church tower is fairly modern, having been added in the 1830s. In the 21st century, the church has increased its peal of bells from five to eight.

The Scarcliffe ecclesiastical parish includes Scarcliffe, Palterton and Hillstown. Scarcliffe now forms a united benefice with Ault Hucknall, Astwith, Bramley Vale, Doe Lea, Glapwell, Hardwick Hall, Stainsby, Rowthorne, and Hardstoft.

== History ==
The village was part of the ancient hundred of Scarsdale. Before the Dissolution of the Monasteries the church was held by Darley Abbey, later becoming a vicarage in the gift of the Dukes of Devonshire, major landowners in the area. The 13th century resident Lady Constantia (whose monument is in the church) left 5 acres (2.0 ha) of land to provide for the ringing of the church's curfew bell for three weeks on either side of Christmas in perpetuity. After some eight hundred years, the 'Bellrope Charity' continues to serve its founder's purpose.

The surviving parish registers date from 1680.

The village school was built in 1868–1869. It was established opposite the former Primitive Methodist church, which had been founded in 1858.

John Marius Wilson's Imperial Gazetteer of England and Wales (1870–1872) says:

SCARCLIFFE, a parish, with a village, in the district of Mansfield and county of Derby; 6 miles (9.7 km) N N W of Mansfield r. station. Post-town, Mansfield. Acres, 3,674. Real property, £3,790. Pop., 548. Houses, 126. The property is divided among a few. The living is a vicarage in the diocese of Lichfield. Value, £70. Patron, Earl Bathurst. The church is ancient but good, and has a tower of 1842. There are an endowed school, and charities £30.

Scarcliffe railway station opened in March 1897. It was built by the Lancashire, Derbyshire and East Coast Railway, which later became part of the Great Central Railway and subsequently the LNER). The line through the station was brought to a premature demise in December 1951 by the deteriorating state of the 2,624-yard (2,399-metre) Bolsover Tunnel a short distance to the west. The tunnel was mostly filled in with colliery waste in 1966-7 but the eastern (Scarcliffe) portal is still visible at the end of an unusually deep sheer-sided cutting.

Palterton also had a station – Palterton & Sutton – on the Doe Lea Valley Line from Staveley to Pleasley. It was opened in September 1890 by the Midland Railway, later part of the LMS. It closed to passengers in September 1930.

In the early 20th century, the main landowner was the 7th Earl Bathurst.

== Geology ==
The soil is predominantly limestone and the subsoil limestone and clay. The village is in a region which is underlaid by a large porous water-bearing rock structure called the Magnesian Limestone aquifer, which dips downwards to the east. Magnesian Limestone is so called because it contains quantities of the mineral Dolomite, which is rich in Magnesium. Where the aquifer comes to the surface, springs appear, and the River Poulter rises from such a spring to the south west of the village, after which it flows around the southern edge on its way to join the River Idle at Elkesley.

== Local government ==
Scarcliffe has its own elected parish council. While this has few powers, it is consulted on all decisions affecting the village by Derbyshire County Council and Bolsover District Council, which together provide most of the local government services. Before a reorganisation in 1974, Scarcliffe was part of the Blackwell Rural District.

== Parliament ==
The village is in the parliamentary constituency of Bolsover.

== Notable people ==
- Harry Elliott (1891–1976), England cricketer

== See also ==
- List of places in Derbyshire
- List of civil parishes in Derbyshire
- Listed buildings in Scarcliffe
