= Grassmoor, Hasland and Winsick =

Civil parish in Derbyshire, England

Coordinates: 53.206°N 1.396°W

- Civil parish
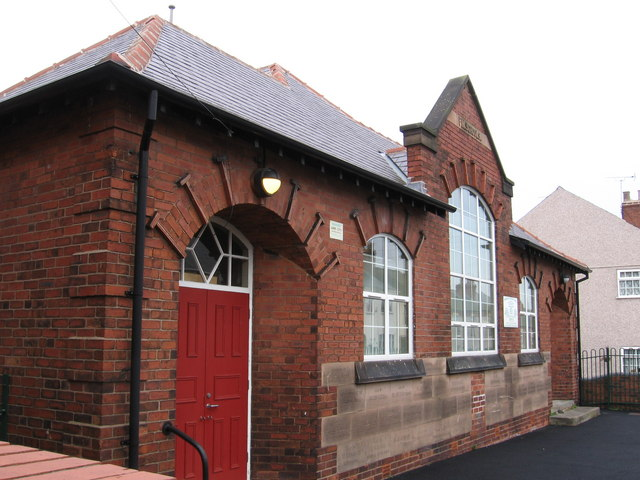
- Grassmoor Community Centre

- Location within Derbyshire
- Interactive map of Grassmoor, Hasland and Winsick
- Area: 1.76 sq mi (4.6 km^{2})
- Population: 4,116 (2021)
  - Density: 2,339/sq mi (903/km^{2})
- OS grid reference: SK 404678
  - London: 130 mi (210 km) SE
- District: North East Derbyshire
- Shire county: Derbyshire
- Region: East Midlands
- Country: England
- Sovereign state: United Kingdom
- Settlements: Grassmoor: Corbriggs; Churchside; Winsick
- Post town: CHESTERFIELD
- Postcode district: S42
- Dialling code: 01246
- Police: Derbyshire
- Fire: Derbyshire
- Ambulance: East Midlands
- UK Parliament: North East Derbyshire
- Website: grassmoorhw-pc.gov.uk

Grassmoor, Hasland and Winsick is a civil parish within the North East Derbyshire district, which is in the county of Derbyshire, England. Named for local settlements, with a mix of a number of villages and hamlets amongst a semi-rural area, it had a population of 4,116 residents in 2021. The parish is 130 miles (210 km) north west of London, 20 miles (32 km) north of the county city of Derby, and 2 miles (3.2 km) south east of the nearest market town of Chesterfield. It shares a boundary with the borough of Chesterfield, along with the parishes of Calow, North Wingfield, Temple Normanton, Tupton as well as Wingerworth. The parish paradoxically does not include the majority of the nearby built-up suburb of Hasland which is now within an adjacent unparished area of Chesterfield.

== Geography ==
=== Location ===
Grassmoor, Hasland and Winsick parish is surrounded by the following local locations:

- Chesterfield, Hasland and Hady to the north
- North Wingfield and Tupton to the south
- Temple Normanton to the east
- Wingerworth to the west.

It is 1.76 square miles (4.6 km^{2}; 460 ha) in area, 2 miles (3.2 km) in height and 1 3/4 miles (2.8 km) in width, within the eastern middle of the North East Derbyshire district, south of Chesterfield district. The parish is roughly bounded by land features such as Hasland cemetery and Winsick housing estate to the north, the Midland Main Line to the west, Calow Brook to the east, and Hagg Hill to the south.

==== Settlements and routes ====
There are four villages within the parish, all are linear settlements situated along the main local roads:

The B6038 road has these two settlements aligned along its route:

- Grassmoor is the largest, and south of the area. It has Grasshill and South End in the north and south as community areas
- Churchside is 1 mile (1.6 km) away from Grassmoor, to the north west

The B6039 road has the following places:

- Corbriggs is 1 mile (1.6 km) north of Grassmoor
- Winsick is 1/2 mile (0.80 km) away from Corbriggs, to the north west

Additionally, an isolated portion of Hasland village extends into the parish at Winsick and is situated alongside the A617 road. It is focused around Honeysuckle Road and Opal Street.

Outside of these settlements, the parish is predominantly an agricultural and rural area.

The key route through the parish is the A617 road from Chesterfield through to the M1 motorway, running through the north eastern portion of the area. The B6039 also from Chesterfield, runs parallel through the south to Tibshelf. The B6038 branches off and then also runs parallel but directly through Grassmoor village to North Wingfield.

=== Environment ===
==== Landscape ====
Primarily farming and pasture land throughout the parish outside the populated areas, there is some forestry throughout, mainly to the east at Grassmoor Country Park.

==== Geology ====
Being a few miles from the Peak District National Park, the composition of the parish is broadly similar, with clay, coal, ironstone and gritstone featuring in the geology of the wider area. It rises through mudstones, sandstones, shales and siltstone, making up the Pennine Middle and Lower Coal Measures Group formed between 309 and 318 million years ago during the Carboniferous period. Along the River Rother, there are superficial deposits of alluvium comprising gravel, sand, silt and clay, being formed between 11.8 thousand years ago and the present during the Quaternary period.

==== Water features ====
The parish rests between the River Rother which flows through pools at the Avenue Washlands Nature Reserve, and Calow Brook which runs alongside the Grassmoor Country Park which also has a number of pools.

==== Land elevation ====
The Rother and Calow brook valleys contain the low points at their northern extremities, at ~80 metres (260 ft), with the villages on plateaus sitting a little higher; Churchside varies from 95–120 metres (312–394 ft), Corbriggs 95–110 metres (312–361 ft), Winsick ranges from 100–115 metres (328–377 ft), and Grassmoor 100–140 metres (330–460 ft) peaking along the southern boundary.

== History ==
=== Toponymy ===
It appears Grassmoor was recorded as a non-settled area during the 1086 Domesday Survey called Gre(y)hirst meaning 'grey copse'.

Hasland was next earliest, being recorded in the 12th century as Haselont, meaning 'hazel grove'.

Winsick was first seen in public record as Winwell Syk from the late 15th century onwards.

=== Local area ===
==== Early history ====
While there are not many prehistoric remains locally, there are Bronze Age finds such as an arrowhead near Hasland, and slightly further afield, a stone ax at Tupton dating human occupation in the region from 2350 BC to 701 BC. More common have been Roman Britain occupation evidence (43AD to 405AD) such as coins. Grassmoor, Hasland and Winsick lay in what was the Scarsdale hundred, which was one of the six ancient divisions of the county, dating back from medieval times until 1894. Grassmoor was referred to as Greyhirst and was associated to Wingerworth in those times. In historic Derbyshire charter records, Greyhirst Wood is mentioned as being between the hamlet of Williamtorp and the 'great road' to Chesterfield, the only route of real note at the time (1300) was called Rykneld Street which was an old Roman Road and ran from Little Chester at Derby to Chesterfield in the Rother Valley. Peter Perez Burdett's Derbyshire map of 1762 shows Grassmoor to be land bounded on the west by the River Rother, to the east by the Chesterfield to Mansfield road, on the south by Lings and in the north by the area now known as Hasland.

In the 13th century the Welbeck Abbey cartulary register mentions Grayhirst and Greyhyrst, the name Gresmore is shown in an unpublished Court Roll dated 1549 and as Grassmore in Chesterfield parish registers from 1568. Only a few rough paths crossed the "moor" at this time, from north to south diagonally one ran along what is now the Hasland to North Wingfield B6038 road, on the southern edge of the moor. Running from east to west and crossing the north–south road was a path which became Birkin Lane and Hagg Hill, now the road from Temple Normanton to Ashover. Approximately in the centre of Grassmoor village a pathway branched off westwards (modern day Mill Lane) passing a windmill on the left, then falling sharply to ford the River Rother and pass a water mill on a tributary of the river before joining the Derby-Chesterfield road near Wingerworth Park.

For much of its medieval life, the area became more widely known as Hasland with it being a township within the broader Chesterfield ancient parish. Many parish townships were eventually converted to parishes themselves, with Hasland becoming one in 1850 with the opening of the parish church at Churchside. The manor of Hasland passed through marriage by means of one of the coheiresses of William Briwere, to Ralph de Midleham and eventually the Duke of Portland, before an exchange with the Duke of Devonshire meant he became lord of the manor by the 19th century. A branch of the Leake family, for several generations, resided at Hasland Hall, in which John Linacre died during 1488. In the middle of the 17th century, the hall belonged to Colonel Roger Molineux, who sold it to Captain John Lowe, of the Alderwasley family, later becoming the property and residence of Thomas Lucas, whose ancestor bought it from the Lowes in 1727.

==== Coal industry ====
Coal mining has taken place since antiquity throughout the UK, but very little evidence of this was being done locally until later medieval times. The extraction of coal was at first restricted to those which lay close to the surface. By the early 18th century there were no deep coal mines, the day of businesses exploiting this for commercial gain had not yet begun, coal mines locations were typically leased from the lord of the manor or landowners by yeomen and well-to-do farmers who required coal for lime burning. These sank shallow pits which supplied the domestic and industrial needs of their neighbours and themselves. This type of mine was known as a bell-pit, the depression of a few of these are still visible in the hollow north of Grasshill, with another site possibly identified for this activity, from these tentative beginnings developed deeper coal mines of later days. Following the Industrial Revolution and with the process of smelting coke to produce iron, which stimulated the demand for coal, deeper mine workings were sunk in Grassmoor in the mid 19th century by Alfred Barnes.

Two rows of houses in Grassmoor were built for workers, the lengthiest was named East Street, but in local parlance called 'Sluggards Row', because although the miners living here were nearest the colliery, they were usually the last to arrive for their shift. The second row named Grasshill was for colliery officials and was known as 'Four Bob', the rent for them being only four shillings per week. Coal mining would dominate the lives of the majority of inhabitants of Grassmoor until the local demise of the industry. Grassmoor Colliery closed in 1971, with Grassmoor Country Park created from the location of its spoil tips. The Avenue Coking Plant was built in 1935, and although mostly in nearby Wingerworth parish (its railway sidings were in Grassmoor) it provided a sustained source of local employment until its closure in 1993. However, this left an unwanted legacy with the site becoming one of the most contaminated of its type in the country. Following a lengthy 20 year clean up process, the area is now clear and redevelopment is ongoing, including the Avenue Washlands Nature Reserve on the site of the former sidings.

==== Amenities and government reorganisation ====
Barnes Park, in the centre of Grassmoor and named after the colliery family, was opened in 1920, with tennis courts, bowling green, football field, cricket field and children's swings. The tennis courts and bowling green were later removed. A cinema was to the far end of the village, it was opened in 1936 and was called the Electric Theatre, later becoming The Roxy, before being redeveloped into a garage and forecourt. Yet another cinema was located at the top of New Street, which later became a billiards hall (named the Drum) and a betting shop, before being demolished. Prior to being a cinema, it was the location of the Grassmoor Primitive Methodist Church, which opened in 1879, replacing a small chapel built earlier in 1877, which had become too small for practical use. In 1899 the existing building was opened, and the old building continued to be used as a Sunday School, and leased to the local education board for use as a school. It was sold in 1913 to the Corporation Theatre Company.

1894 was the beginning of a loss of parish territory administratively which originally stretched up to the rivers Rother and Hipper, and encompassed Chesterfield suburbs Boythorpe, Hady and Spital, with further land transfers in 1910 and 1920 when much of the village of Hasland was absorbed into Chesterfield parish and borough. Further perimeter adjustments were made in 1988. However even with these changes, the parish was still named Hasland. In 1982, the formal name of the council was changed to include Grassmoor and Winsick. Since the 1980s, much of the housing stock is terraced properties and council housing, although new estates have been developed including larger detached properties by the Windwhistle Farm built off Birkin Lane, and since the 2010s the Honeysuckle Road/Opal Street development in Winsick. The Big Lottery Fund in 2012 designated Grassmoor and Hasland as a Big Local Area, and in 2014 it awarded £1+ million of funds to spend over 10 years aimed at supporting residents with community led initiatives to improve the overall well-being of those localities.

== Governance and demography ==
=== Population ===
There are 4,116 residents for the 2021 census, an increase from the 3,360 recorded within the parish for the 2011 census, and 3,452 of the 2001 census.

=== Local bodies ===
Grassmoor, Hasland and Winsick parish is managed at the first level of public administration through a parish council. The council area comprises the two wards of Grassmoor which is represented by four councillors; and Hasland & Winsick which has seven councillors.

At district level, the wider area is overseen by North East Derbyshire district council. Derbyshire County Council provides the highest level strategic services locally.

== Economy ==
The present business sector types other than agriculture in the parish are varied, but are located evenly throughout except for the moor areas, with these employment areas including:

- Motor servicing, sales, hire and parts
- Garden supplies
- Commercial storage
- Sports and leisure activities
- Pet supplies
- Smaller various retail premises

== Community and leisure ==
=== Amenities ===
There is a village community centre at Grassmoor. There are public houses at Grassmoor and Winsick, with a working men's club at Grassmoor. Family and health services are at Grassmoor. Community allotments are in Grassmoor.

The village has a limited selection of shops including a post office, which cater for every day needs. Shopping for other items generally requires travelling to Chesterfield or other nearby towns such as Clay Cross or Mansfield.

=== Recreation ===
Barnes Park is at Grassmoor with a play ground and football pitch, while a small park with play area is at Winsick village.

Grassmoor Country Park is situated at the northern end of the Five Pits Trail which provides an off-road route for walkers, cyclists and horse riders. The park includes former nearby colliery and coking plant tar lagoons which have been reclaimed to provide a recreational site for the benefit and enjoyment of the local community.

=== Community groups ===
Several interest groups exist in the community, predominantly at Grassmoor:

- Perseverance Allotment Association
- Friendship Club
- Luncheon Club
- Past & Present History Group

== Education ==
There is a school at Grassmoor village, Grassmoor Primary.

== Landmarks ==
=== Conservation ===
==== Listed building ====
There is one location of architectural merit throughout the parish with statutory listed status at Grade II, the 1850 built Church of St Paul at Churchside.

==== Green belt ====
Much of the parish, except for Grassmoor village and Winsick is covered by the North East Derbyshire Green Belt, which is a part of the more extensive South and West Yorkshire Green Belt, its core function affording planning protection from urban sprawl and inappropriate development.

=== War memorials ===
There are monuments commemorating locals who served in but did not return from the World War I and WWII conflicts within Grassmoor village at Barnes Park, and Winsick Park. There is a tablet in St Paul's Church, Churchside with names inscribed.

== Sport ==
North of Grassmoor lies South Chesterfield Golf Club. It is an 18-hole golf course.

There is a cricket club and grounds, a ball court and a facility for skating at Barnes Park in Grassmoor.

Grassmoor F.C. are a locally based football club in the Chesterfield and District Sunday Football League of the Derbyshire County Football Association.

== Transport ==
Grassmoor is relatively well served by public bus transport with buses running to Chesterfield every weekday.

Although the Derby to Sheffield Midland Main Line forms the western edge of the parish, the nearest railway station is at Chesterfield.

== Religious sites ==
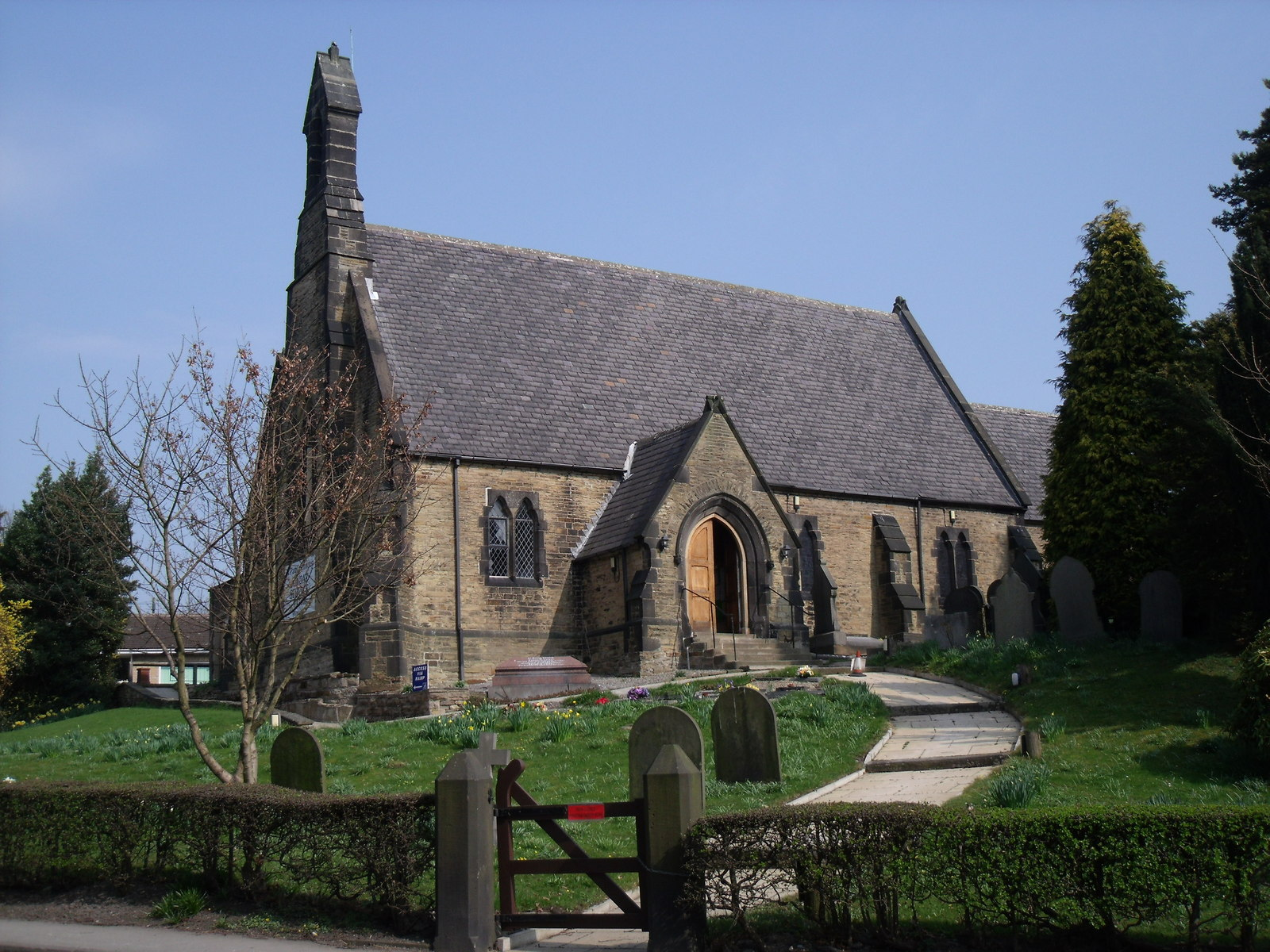
St Paul's, Churchside

St Paul's in Churchside village is an Anglican place of worship which was built in 1850, alongside it is Hasland Cemetery. There is also a Methodist church in Grassmoor.

== Notable people ==
- Matthew Burton (1897 – 1940), football player
- Tommy Meads (1900 – 1983), professional footballer and former player for Grassmoor Ivanhoe
- Ben Twell (1903 – 1986), former player for Grassmoor Ivanhoe
- Edwin Smith (born 1934), cricketer
- Paul Burrell (born 1958), royal servant to Diana, Princess of Wales
