= St John the Baptist's Church, Ault Hucknall =

Coordinates: 53°10′54.69″N 1°18′9.59″W

St John the Baptist’s Church, Ault Hucknall
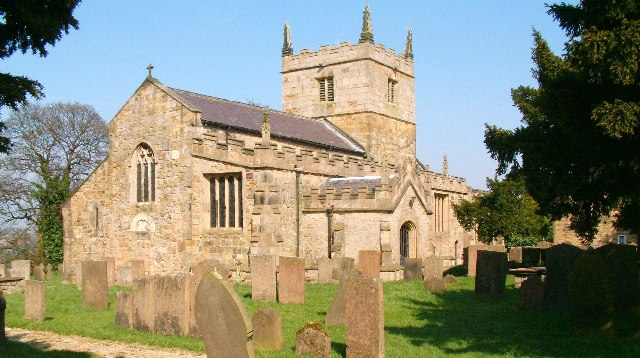
- St John the Baptist’s Church, Ault Hucknall
- St John the Baptist’s Church, Ault Hucknall
- Location: Ault Hucknall
- Country: England
- Denomination: Church of England

History
- Dedication: St John the Baptist

Architecture
- Heritage designation: Grade I listed
- Designated: 8 July 1966
- Architect: William Butterfield (restoration)

Administration
- Diocese: Diocese of Derby
- Archdeaconry: Chesterfield
- Deanery: Bolsover and Staveley
- Parish: Ault Hucknall

St John the Baptist's Church, Ault Hucknall, is a Grade I listed parish church in the Church of England in Ault Hucknall, Derbyshire.

== History ==
The church dates from the 11th century with 14th- and 15th-century features. It was restored between 1885 and 1888 by William Butterfield.

== Parish status ==
The church is in a joint parish with

- St Andrew's Church, Glapwell
- St Leonard's Church, Scarcliffe
- St Luke's Church, Palterton

== Memorials ==
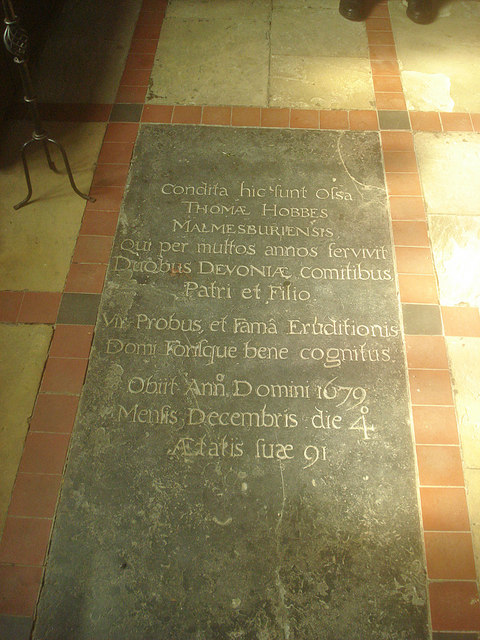
Tomb of Thomas Hobbes

- Anne Keighley, wife of William Cavendish, 1st Earl of Devonshire
- Thomas Hobbes (d. 1679)

== Organ ==
The pipe organ was installed by Brindley & Foster around 1905. A specification of the organ can be found on the National Pipe Organ Register.

== See also ==
- Grade I listed churches in Derbyshire
- Listed buildings in Ault Hucknall
