= Astwith =

Village in Derbyshire, England

Coordinates: 53.17°N 01.34°W

- Village
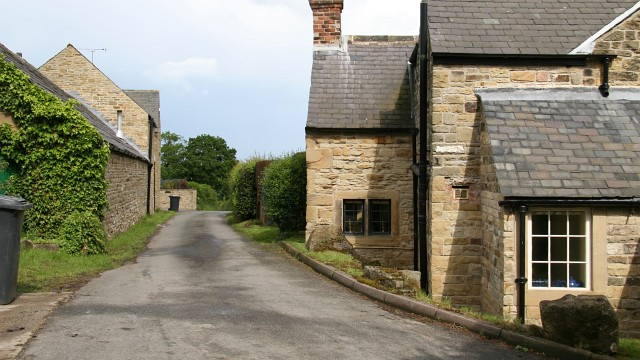
- Astwith Lane

- Location within Derbyshire
- OS grid reference: SK442638
- Civil parish: Ault Hucknall
- District: Bolsover
- Shire county: Derbyshire
- Region: East Midlands
- Country: England
- Sovereign state: United Kingdom
- Post town: CHESTERFIELD
- Postcode district: S45
- Police: Derbyshire
- Fire: Derbyshire
- Ambulance: East Midlands

Astwith is a village in Derbyshire, England. Astwith is in the parish of Ault Hucknall. For many decades it was part of the manor of Stainsby, which was known as Steinesbei in the Domesday survey of 1087.

There are around 20 homes in Astwith today. Astwith is one of 27 conservation areas within Bolsover District Council area; the Local Conservation Plan for Astwith was approved by the council in 2010.

A circular walk of around 5.5 miles (8.9 km) is centred on Astwith and is a part of the longer Five Pits Trail connecting Tibshelf, Holmewood and Grassmoor.

== See also ==
- Listed buildings in Ault Hucknall
