= Chesterfield Marathon =

Running event in England

- Chesterfield Marathon Logo
- Date: 20 September
- Location: Chesterfield, United Kingdom
- Event type: Road
- Distance: Marathon
- Established: 2014; 12 years ago
- Website: www.chesterfieldmarathon.org.uk/

The Chesterfield Marathon was a long-distance running event held in Chesterfield, United Kingdom, and established in 2014. It ran twice, in 2014 and 2015, being suspended in 2016 and not yet returning.

The First Chesterfield Marathon was held on the 24 October 1982 and started from the Squash Club on Old Road. The race was to support the NEDSCAN APPEAL. The runners entry fees and/or fund raising went to the appeal together with the main sponsor donation, the car dealership Gordon Lamb. The 1984 Chesterfield Marathon was sponsored by Woodleigh, assume car dealership. The Chesterfield Marathon ran from 1982 for approximately four to six years. The Derbyshire Times published photographs of the events.

== Course ==
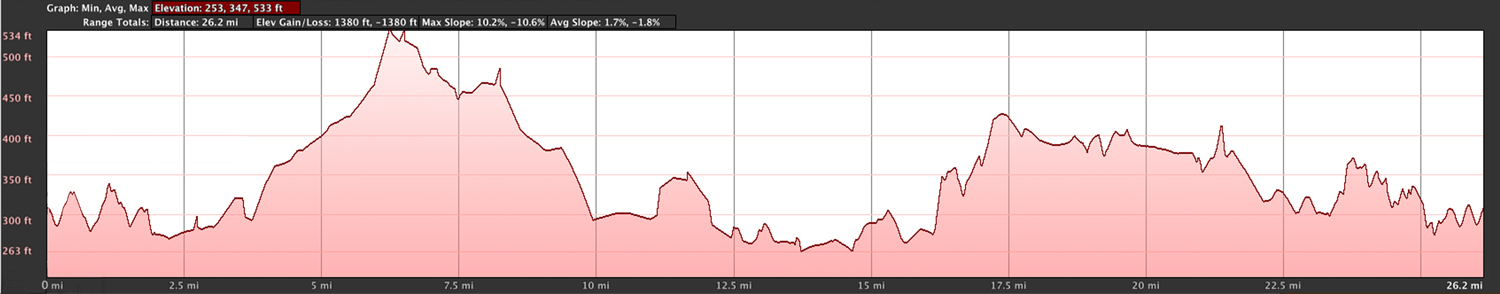
A gradient profile of the Chesterfield Marathon

The marathon was run over a fairly undulating course with route markers at one mile intervals. The course had a total distance of 26.2 miles (42.2 km), a total elevation gain/loss of 1,380 feet (420 m), an average elevation of 347 feet (106 m) and an average slope of approximately 1.75%. See the gradient profile to the right for more detail.

The course began at Queen's Park, and after passing Rose Hill and the Crooked Spire followed the A617 to Temple Normanton, Holmewood and Hasland, followed by the A61 to Lockoford Lane. The route then proceeded to Dunston via Racecourse Road, through Newbold on Keswick Drive and Loundsley Green Road before heading into Holmebrook Park and on Linacre Road towards Brampton. The course took a winding route through Brampton including Ashgate Road, Old Road, Springfield Avenue before heading onto Saltergate into the town centre. The last section of the route passed through Vicar Lane and West Bars to then turn back into Queens Park at the finish line.
