= Seize the Day (band) =

British folk band

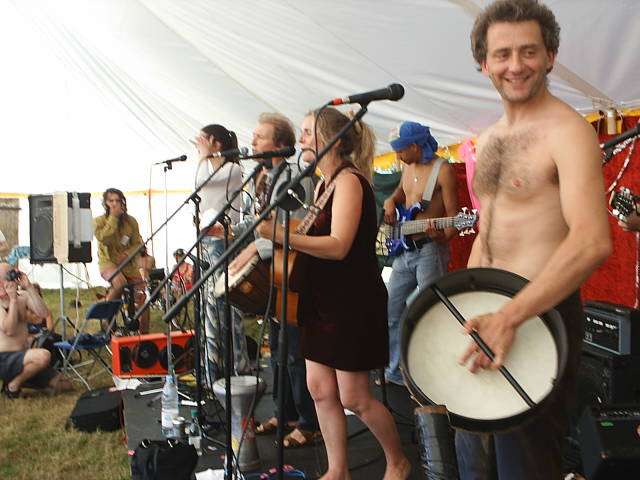
Seize the Day performing on the pedal powered stage at the UK Permaculture Association AGM

Seize The Day are a folk band from the United Kingdom. They specialise in protest songs, and have supported many environmental campaigns across the world.

== History ==
Seize The Day were founded in 1997 by singer-songwriters Theo Simon and Shannon Smy, to celebrate and inspire the country's environmental movement. The band has grown to include between five and eight members.

The band have played annually at the Glastonbury Festival, including the main stage in 1998, as well as The Green Gathering every year since the band formed. They have also played at many other Folk Festivals, including Cambridge, Towersey, Sidmouth, Ely and Stainsby. They also regularly perform at other festivals including Buddhafield, Off Grid, and Permaculture Gatherings.

Because of their radical lyrics and songs, and their commitment to acting on their beliefs, they have also developed a wide following among grass-roots campaigners, playing at a large number of benefit gigs and protest meetings.

In 2002 the band elected to give up flying, due to their concerns over the environmental impact of air travel.

== Style ==
Although they have recorded several albums, the band is mainly known for its live work, which has gained them popularity on the folk and alternative scene. The music is enhanced by compelling vocal arrangements, with powerful lyrics addressing environmental and political themes. They are able to perform acoustically and outside with a solar-powered PA.

== Campaigning ==
Seize The day's political and environmental commitment has sometimes led to controversy. In 2003 they won the Audience poll for the BBC Radio 3 Awards for World Music, but were denied the award because of their stance on the war in Iraq – members of the band responded by protesting at the award ceremony and with the slogans 'Peace Not War' written on their bodies climbed naked onto the stage as the final encore of the night.

Their music was featured on the international CD Peace Not War, alongside Ani Difranco and Billy Bragg. Their international appeal was reflected in the BBC World Service listeners selection of Shannon Smy as "pick of the week" in 2000, following her appearance on Everywoman.

Before making the decision to no longer fly the band spent three months on a musical campaign tour promoting sustainable agriculture in India, visiting rural villages in Andhra Pradesh, helping to support farmers, and performing to policy makers.

The band spent one Christmas supporting the Peace Movement in the West Bank, and helping to facilitate Palestinian access to basic services such as water.

Seize The Day's American tours have included a range of concerts supporting the Small and Family Farmers Alliance, as well as fund raising for various environmental campaigning organisations.

They also performed as the headline band at the "Rally for Rural America" in Washington, D.C., the Biodevastation Conference in Boston, the May Day March in San Francisco and dozens of venues up and down the east and west coasts of the US and Canada. They also played to 5000 people at The KeyArena in Seattle on the eve of the WTO protests in 1999.

Additionally performing at an action in London against the necessity of GM crops to alieviate hunger in the third world and criticing that this hunger is as a result of international corporation who are also the financial benifactors of the research and production of GM crops.

== Radio and television ==
Seize The Day have featured on the BBC Radio 4 programme Singing in the Wilderness, hosted by Tom Robinson. Lead singer Shannon Smy was subsequently interviewed for BBC World Service's Everywoman, reaching 45 million listeners worldwide. Smy's appearance was also selected for the Pick of the World programme, and Theo Simon was a guest on BBC Two’s Newsnight.

== Instruments ==
Seize The Day members play a variety of instruments including:

- Acoustic guitar
- Bouzouki
- Didgeridoo
- Electric bass
- Flute
- Hand drums
- Mandola
- Mandolin
- Percussion
- Saxophone
- Tin whistle
- Violin
- Harmony vocals

== Discography ==
=== Albums ===
- It's Your Life... It's Our World! (Wildwood Acoustic WILD CD 19801, 1998)
- All Hands That Are Ready (Wildwood Acoustic WILD CD 10109, 2001)
- Alive (Wildwood Acoustic WILD CD 12003, 2004) (Double)
- The Tide is Turning (Wildwood Acoustic WILD CD 120062, 2006)
- Standing Strong (Wildwood Acoustic WILD CD 20101, 2010)
- Festival (2013) (Compilation)
- The Folk Collection (2013) (Compilation)
- Making Waves (2017)
- With My Hammer (2017) Smy – solo album
- Hold Onto Your Love (2022)
