= Listed buildings in Ault Hucknall =

Ault Hucknall is a civil parish in the Bolsover district of Derbyshire, England. The parish contains 23 listed buildings that are recorded in the National Heritage List for England. Of these, three are listed at Grade I, the highest of the three grades, one is at Grade II*, the middle grade, and the others are at Grade II, the lowest grade. The parish contains the village of Ault Hucknall and the surrounding area, including the settlements of Astwith, Hardstoft, and Rowthorne. The most important buildings in the parish are Hardwick Hall and its predecessor Hardwick Old Hall, which are listed together with associated structures in the grounds and surrounding parkland. The other listed buildings include a church and a chest tomb in the churchyard, houses and farmhouses, a public house, a watermill, a former Sunday school, and a war memorial.

== Key ==
Grade	Criteria
I	Buildings of exceptional interest, sometimes considered to be internationally important
II*	Particularly important buildings of more than special interest
II	Buildings of national importance and special interest

== Buildings ==
Name and location	Photograph	Date	Notes	Grade
St John the Baptist's Church; 53.18215°N 1.30203°W		11th century	The church has been extended and altered through the centuries, and was restored in 1885–58 by William Butterfield. It is built in sandstone with a Welsh slate roof, and consists of a nave with a clerestory, north and south aisles, a south porch, a chancel with a north vestry and a south chapel, and a tower at the crossing. The tower has two-light bell openings and an embattled parapet with crocketed corner pinnacles. The blocked west doorway dates from the 11th century, and has a lintel incised with a depiction of Saint George and the Dragon, and in the tympanum above is a centaur. The parapets on the body of the church also have embattled parapets and finials.	I
Hardwick Old Hall; 53.16812°N 1.31072°W		Early 16th century	The hall is now derelict, it is in sandstone and without a roof. There is a chamfered plinth, and the remains of coped gables and parapets. It has four and five storeys on a basement storey, and an irregular plan with a south front of ten bays. Some windows are cross windows, others are mullioned or mullioned and transomed. At the northeast corner is a two-storey rendered lodge with quoins and a balustraded parapet.	I
Hall Farmhouse; 53.17913°N 1.28512°W		16th century	The farmhouse, which was remodelled in 1844, is in sandstone, and has a stone slate roof with coped gables, kneelers, and decorative bargeboards. There are two storeys and attics, a south front of three bays and an east front of four bays. The outer bays of the south front are gabled. The middle bay is recessed, it has a coped parapet, and contains a porch with a four-centred arch, a chamfered surround, and a moulded hood mould, and to its left is a canted bay window. The third bay of the east front is gabled, and contains a doorway with a four-centred arch, pierced spandrels, and a hood mould. On this front is a datestone.	II
Conduit house 53.16778°N 1.31090°W		1587–90	The conduit house to the south of Hardwick Old Hall is in sandstone, and has a rectangular plan. There is a chamfered plinth, and at the top of the base is a string course. On this stand four tall round arches with simple bases and capitals, and on the north and south sides are walls up to half the height of the arches. At the top is moulded cornice and a blocking course.	II
Hardwick Hall; 53.16882°N 1.30871°W		1590–97	A country house that was altered in 1788, and a service wing added in 1860. It is in sandstone on a moulded plinth, with moulded string courses, a moulded eaves cornice, and an openwork parapet. There are two storeys, a basement storey, three-storey towers with openwork parapets incorporating initials, an H-shaped plan, and a symmetrical front of 14 bays. Across the middle six bays is a colonnade on Tuscan columns, and the windows are mullioned and transomed. To the rear is a two-storey service range.	I
Gazebo and garden walls, Hardwick Hall; 53.16887°N 1.30990°W		1590–97	The walls enclosing the gardens and the incorporated lodge and bastions are in sandstone. The walls have chamfered copings and elaborate shaped finials. At the corners are triangular bastions, and at the entrance is a lodge, all with polygonal finials and elaborate strapwork cresting. The entrance lodge is tower-like, and contains a chamfered round arch.	II
The Hardwick Inn; 53.16506°N 1.31472°W		c. 1608	The public house, which has been much altered, is in sandstone, and has a stone slate roof with coped gables. There are two storeys and an attic, and five bays, the middle bay gabled. The doorway has a chamfered surround and a mullioned fanlight. Some windows are cross windows, and the others are mullioned.	II
Range of cottages, Hardwick Hall; 53.16665°N 1.30995°W		17th century	The range of cottages, which was extended later, is in sandstone, and has a stone slate roof with coped gables. The cottages are in two and three storeys, and there is a front of 17 irregular bays. The windows are cross windows, or are mullioned and transomed.	II
Range of outbuildings, stables and walls, Hardwick Hall; 53.16636°N 1.30855°W		17th century	The range of buildings is in sandstone, and has stone slate roofs with coped gables. At the east end is a cartshed with six openings, beyond which is a shed. To the west is a recessed two-bay building with a central doorway flanked by mullioned windows. Beyond this is a six-bay range with mullioned windows, and to the west of this is a wall with a round-headed arch and a stepped gable. At the west end is a two-storey stable containing doorways, mullioned windows, and slit vents. On the roof is a two-stage clock turret with clock faces in the lower stage, and a pyramidal roof. The upper stage is open, and has an ogee roof and a weathervane.	II*
Manor Farm Cottage; 53.17300°N 1.34227°W		17th century (probable)	The oldest part of the house is the central rear cross-wing, the main part dating from 1730, and with later additions. It is in sandstone with a slate roof, and two storeys. The main range has three bays, a central doorway, and sash windows. At the rear are three cross-wings, and in the central wing are quoins and a mullioned window.	II
Pear Tree Farmhouse; 53.18018°N 1.28447°W		17th century	The farmhouse is in sandstone and has a Welsh slate roof with coped gables, moulded kneelers, and a ball finial. There are two storeys and three bays. On the front is a doorway and three-light casement windows.	II
The Grange; 53.17627°N 1.31137°W		17th century	A sandstone house with quoins, a floor band, and a roof of stone slate and tile with coped gables and moulded kneelers. There are two storeys and a front of two bays. On the front is a lattice-work porch flanked by windows with two round-headed lights, and in the upper floor are two-light mullioned windows.	II
Chest tomb 53.18205°N 1.30227°W		c. 1719	The chest tomb is in the churchyard of St John the Baptist's Church, and is in sandstone. The chest is constructed in plain slabs, and the top has a moulded edge. On the top is carved a coat of arms and a group of workman's tools.	II
Yew Tree Farmhouse; 53.16436°N 1.34311°W		Mid 18th century	The farmhouse is in sandstone, and has a tile roof with coped gables and moulded kneelers. There are two storeys and six bays. The doorway has a moulded surround, above it is a single-light window, and the other windows are mullioned.	II
Stainsby Mill; 53.18304°N 1.31963°W		Late 18th century	A watermill in sandstone that has a stone slate roof with coped gables and moulded kneelers. There are two storeys and two bays. The doorways have chamfered surrounds, the windows are mullioned, and there is a gabled dormer.	II
Joiner's shop, Hardwick Hall; 53.16588°N 1.30990°W		Mid 19th century	The building in the grounds of the hall is in sandstone, and has a roof of Welsh slate and tile. There is a single storey, and an L-shaped plan, consisting of the front range of three bays, and a rear range of six bays. In the front range is a central doorway with a chamfered surround and mullioned windows. The rear range contains plank doors, mullioned windows and former cart entrances.	II
Rowthorne Lodge; 53.17800°N 1.29658°W		Mid 19th century	The lodge at the north entrance to the grounds of Hardwick Hall is in sandstone, with quoins, a moulded floor band and eaves cornice, and a hipped stone slate roof with moulded finials. It is in one and two storeys and has a rectangular plan. The windows have two-lights and are mullioned with stepped surrounds, and the doorway has a chamfered surround and a rectangular fanlight.	II
Stables, The Hardwick Inn; 53.16515°N 1.31514°W		Mid 19th century	The stables are in sandstone, and have a stone slate roof with coped gables. There is one storey, and a front of seven irregular bays. The central bay is gabled and contains two round-arched entrances with chamfered surrounds, and a single-light window above. The other openings include doorways with triangular-arched lintels, mullioned windows, and a cart entrance.	II
Former Sunday School; 53.16463°N 1.34843°W		1858	The former Sunday school is in red brick and sandstone, it has a Welsh slate roof with coped gables, and a gabled bellcote on the north gable. On the front is a gabled porch with a four-centred arched doorway, above which is a quatrefoil datestone. The windows on the front are cross windows, and in each gable end is a three-light mullioned window and a blind triangular-headed window above.	II
Engine house, saw mill and chimney, Hardwick Hall; 53.16553°N 1.30963°W		1860	The building in the grounds of the hall is in sandstone, and has a stone slate roof with coped gables. There are two storeys, a rectangular plan, and a gabled two-bay west front. This front contains a round-arched entrance, and to the left is a doorway with a shallow arched lintel. Above are two two-light mullioned windows and a slit window in the gable, and on the south front are three two-light mullioned windows. Attached at the east end is a tall circular chimney with a moulded band and a cornice at the top.	II
Shed, Hardwick Hall; 53.16565°N 1.30976°W		1861	The shed in the grounds of the hall is in sandstone, and has a pantile roof, and a single storey. On the west front is a round-arched opening, on the south is a three-light mullioned window, and in the north front is a doorway and a casement window.	II
Six Statues, Hardwick Hall; 53.16784°N 1.30897°W		1868	The statues in the garden of the hall were moved here from Chatsworth House. They are in lead, and depict various male and female antique figures. The statues stand on moulded plinths and stepped square bases in sandstone.	II
Ault Hucknall War Memorial; 53.18331°N 1.32022°W		1920	The war memorial is sited at a road junction. It consists of an obelisk in Darley Dale stone, on a shallow cornice, on a square plinth, on a base of three steps. The obelisk has inscriptions, and on the plinth are the names of those lost in the two World Wars.	II
