= Twell =

Twell and Twells are English surnames. Notable persons with one of these names include:

- Ben Twell (1903–1986), English footballer
- Stephanie Twell (born 1989), British runner
- Terry Twell (1947–2013), English footballer
- Edward Twells (1823–1898), Bishop of Bloemfontein in South Africa
- Henry Twells (1823–1900), Anglican clergyman, hymn writer and poet
- Leonard Twells (1684?–1742), English cleric and theological writer
