= Glapwell =

Village in Derbyshire, England

Coordinates: 53.189°N 1.282°W

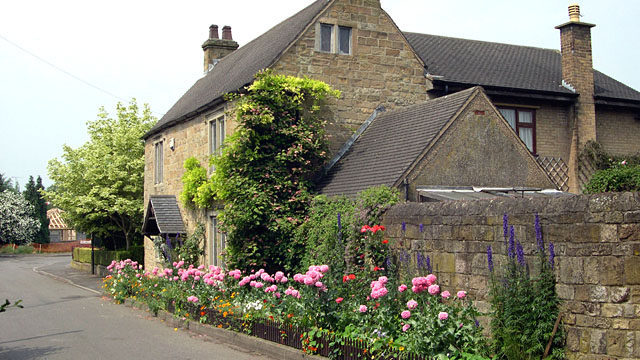
- Back Lane

- Location within Derbyshire
- Population: 1,503 (2011)
- OS grid reference: SK480660
- Civil parish: Glapwell
- District: Bolsover
- Shire county: Derbyshire
- Region: East Midlands
- Country: England
- Sovereign state: United Kingdom
- Post town: CHESTERFIELD
- Postcode district: S44
- Police: Derbyshire
- Fire: Derbyshire
- Ambulance: East Midlands

Glapwell is a village and civil parish in the Bolsover District of Derbyshire, England. The village is at the top of a steep hill at an elevation of 176 metres (577 ft), on the western edge of the Southern Magnesian Limestone, overlooking the valley of the River Doe Lea (formerly known as the Dorley). It lies between Chesterfield (7 miles to the north-west), Mansfield (5 miles to the south-east), and Bolsover (3 miles to the north), and had a population of 1,503 at the 2011 Census.

== History ==
Glapwell dates back to pre-history, with evidence of human activity stretching back to the Mesolithic period. Flint tools from this era have been discovered in the area, confirming its use by early hunter-gatherer societies. One of the key features of the village is Green Lane, an ancient route that likely dates back to prehistoric times, possibly linking Glapwell to other significant prehistoric sites such as Pleasley Vale and Creswell Crags. Pleasley Vale is known for its caves and evidence of early human occupation, while Creswell Crags, a short distance away, is renowned for its Ice Age cave art and evidence of habitation over 50,000 years ago.

During the Iron Age, the area would have been occupied by the Brigantes, a powerful tribe that controlled much of northern England. The elevated terrain and fertile lands of Glapwell made it an ideal settlement location, with natural springs providing a reliable water source.

Following the Roman invasion of Britain in the 1st century AD, the region came under Roman control. There have been several minor Roman finds in the Glapwell area, including pottery and coins. Notable discoveries include two coarse ware sherds of Roman pottery and a Samian rim, all found near Glapwell Lane. The elevated position and fertile lands suggest the possibility of a Roman villa in the area, similar to the Villa at Pleasley Vale. Although no direct evidence of a villa has been uncovered, the presence of Roman artefacts points to a Roman influence on the settlement and economy.

In 1086, Glapwell is recorded in Domesday, where it is listed under its current name. At that time, it was held by Serb from William Peverel, one of the most prominent Norman lords in the region. The entry states:

"In Glapwell, Liefric had one carucate of land to the geld. There is land for two ploughs. There eight villans have 6 ploughs... Serb now holds it."

Glapwell's Anglo-Saxon origins are well established, as the village existed at the time of the Domesday survey. Glapwell also played a significant role in the Honour of Peverel, an estate controlled by William Peverel. Many Peverel Courts were held in Glapwell, because of its proximity to Bolsover, the family seat of the Peverels, further emphasising its importance in the medieval period.

The Glapwell Charters, dating from the 11th century, provide valuable insights into the governance and land ownership in the village. These documents reveal the social and legal landscape of the time, offering a glimpse into how Glapwell functioned within the broader framework of the Honour of Peverel.

In addition to its early medieval history, Glapwell Hall played a central role in the village's identity. The hall, which once stood overlooking the Doe Lea Valley and near Sherwood Forest, was an important estate until its demolition in the 20th century. Its location offered strategic advantages, including access to fresh water from natural springs, which helped sustain the medieval village.

In the modern period, Glapwell Colliery became a key feature of the village's industrial landscape. The colliery operated until the 1970s, after which the site was redeveloped for commercial purposes. There is no longer a dominant industry in the area, and most residents now work outside of the village.

== Amenities ==
The village has a local shop/post office and one pub/restaurant, the Young Vanish (named after a 19th-century champion racehorse). The Plug and Feathers (formerly Ma Hubbards and originally the Glapwell Hotel, known by many locals as "The New Un"), near the former station at the bottom of Glapwell Hill, is now being refurbished for the new owner, Starbucks.

Nearby is Hardwick Hall, an Elizabethan mansion in a commanding position high on the same hill as Glapwell, operated by the National Trust. Access to the grounds and Hall was possible via Rowthorne Lane in Glapwell, but this was stopped in the early 1990s to reduce traffic in the residential area of the village. Access is now only possible via Mill Lane under the motorway bridge M1 motorway near the village of Heath; Mill Lane joins the old coaching road approach to the mansion from Stainsby Mill, a working watermill restored by the National Trust.

The local football team Glapwell F.C. play their home games at Hall Corner in the north of the village. The cricket team, Glapwell Colliery Cricket Club, play their home games at Park Avenue.

== See also ==
- List of places in Derbyshire
- Listed buildings in Glapwell
