= Grassmoor =

Village in Derbyshire, England

Coordinates: 53.201°N 1.397°W

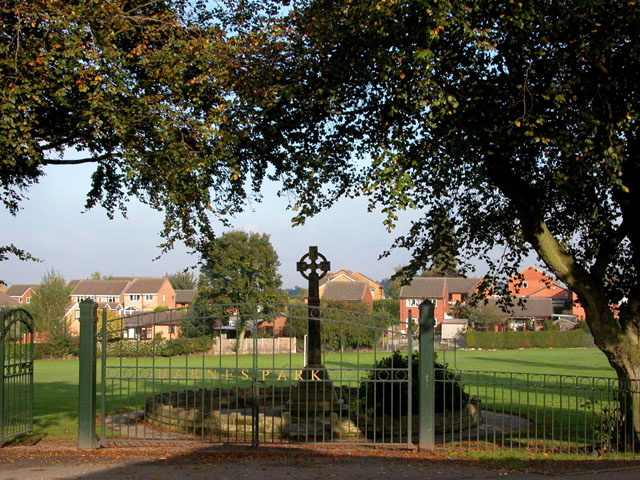
- The entrance gates to Barnes Park are near the centre of Grassmoor, across the road from the village school. The war memorial stands just inside the entrance.

- Location within Derbyshire
- Population: 3,360 (2011)
- OS grid reference: SK403672
- Civil parish: Grassmoor, Hasland and Winsick
- District: North East Derbyshire
- Shire county: Derbyshire
- Region: East Midlands
- Country: England
- Sovereign state: United Kingdom
- Post town: CHESTERFIELD
- Postcode district: S42
- Dialling code: 01246
- Police: Derbyshire
- Fire: Derbyshire
- Ambulance: East Midlands

Grassmoor is a village in Derbyshire, England, approximately three miles to the south of Chesterfield its distance from London is 148.5 miles. Its original name, according to 16th-century parish records, was Gresmore. The appropriate civil parish is called Grassmoor, Hasland and Winsick. The population of this civil parish at the 2011 Census was 3,360. Grassmoor formerly housed many miners, however all of the local mines in the area have been closed since the mid-eighties.

Opposite Grassmoor Primary School is Barnes Park and the cricket pitch. Many local cricket matches are played in the park and it is also host to an annual Summer Fete.

== Parish council ==
Grassmoor Parish Council covers the village of Grassmoor and also the areas of Winsick and Hasland. The area covered by this Parish when combined with the area covered by the Parish of Temple Normanton forms Grassmoor district electoral ward. The Parish is part of Sutton County electoral division.

== Five Pits Trail ==
The Five Pits Trail is a five and a half mile off-road surfaced route from Grassmoor Country Park to Tibshelf Ponds.

The Five Pits Trail is so named as it 5 mines that interlink local coal mines Coalfields. The former collieries had a long death, with deep mines gradually being replaced by huge opencast workings, which had a lifespan of less than 20 years. Reclamation and conservation over the past 30 years have seen spoil tips and wasteland replaced by hay meadows and woodland.

Areas of water have attracted upwards of 200 species of birds. The bird reserves at Williamthorpe Ponds are partially filled by water pumped at a constant 10 °C which attracts many birds, particularly in winter.

== Lagoons ==
Grassmoor lagoons were formed in spoil tips at the former Grassmoor Colliery, which operated on the site from the 1840s until its closure in 1967. When British Coal opened the Avenue Coking Works nearby, it used the lagoon area to treat waste liquid from the coking works. During this time, large amounts of coal tar sludge from the works settled in the lagoons. The Avenue Coking Works closed in 1993, and Derbyshire County Council took over the lagoons site later the same year. Derbyshire County Council owns the Grassmoor Lagoons site and has secured funding to remediate the lagoons area. Once this is achieved, the council intends to incorporate the area back into the Grassmoor Country Park. This was due to begin in 2009, however, no progress has been made as of March 2018.

== Notable people ==
- Ellis Gee (1877–1948), footballer who played 245 games including 214 for Notts County
- Tommy Meads (1900–1983), footballer, who played over 370 games, mainly for Tottenham Hotspur & Stockport County
- Edwin Smith (born 1934), cricketer who played 503 First-class cricket matches for Derbyshire
- Paul Burrell (born 1958), grew up in the village, before eventually becoming the butler of Diana, Princess of Wales

== Attractions ==
Grassmoor Primary School is government funded. Grassmoor Community Centre hosts community events such as small fairs.
