= Heath, Derbyshire =

Village in Derbyshire, England

Coordinates: 53.1982°N 1.3353°W

Heath
- Village
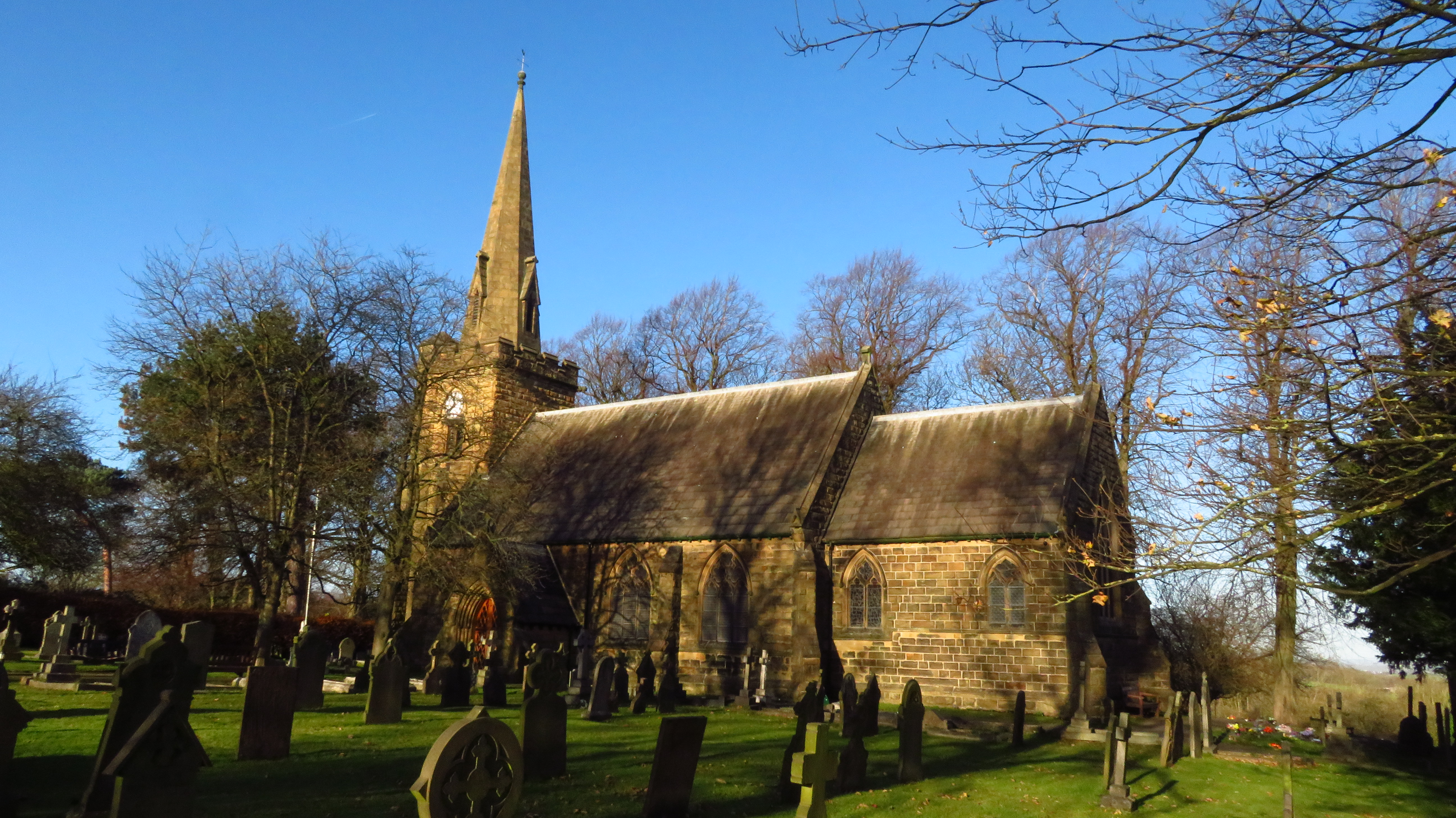
- All Saints Church

- Location within Derbyshire
- Population: 2,953 (2011)
- OS grid reference: SK445670
- Civil parish: Heath and Holmewood
- District: North East Derbyshire
- Shire county: Derbyshire
- Region: East Midlands
- Country: England
- Sovereign state: United Kingdom
- Post town: CHESTERFIELD
- Postcode district: S44
- Dialling code: 01246
- Police: Derbyshire
- Fire: Derbyshire
- Ambulance: East Midlands
- UK Parliament: Bolsover

Heath is a village in the North East Derbyshire district of the English county of Derbyshire. The civil parish is called Heath and Holmewood. The population of this parish as taken at the 2011 Census was 2,953.

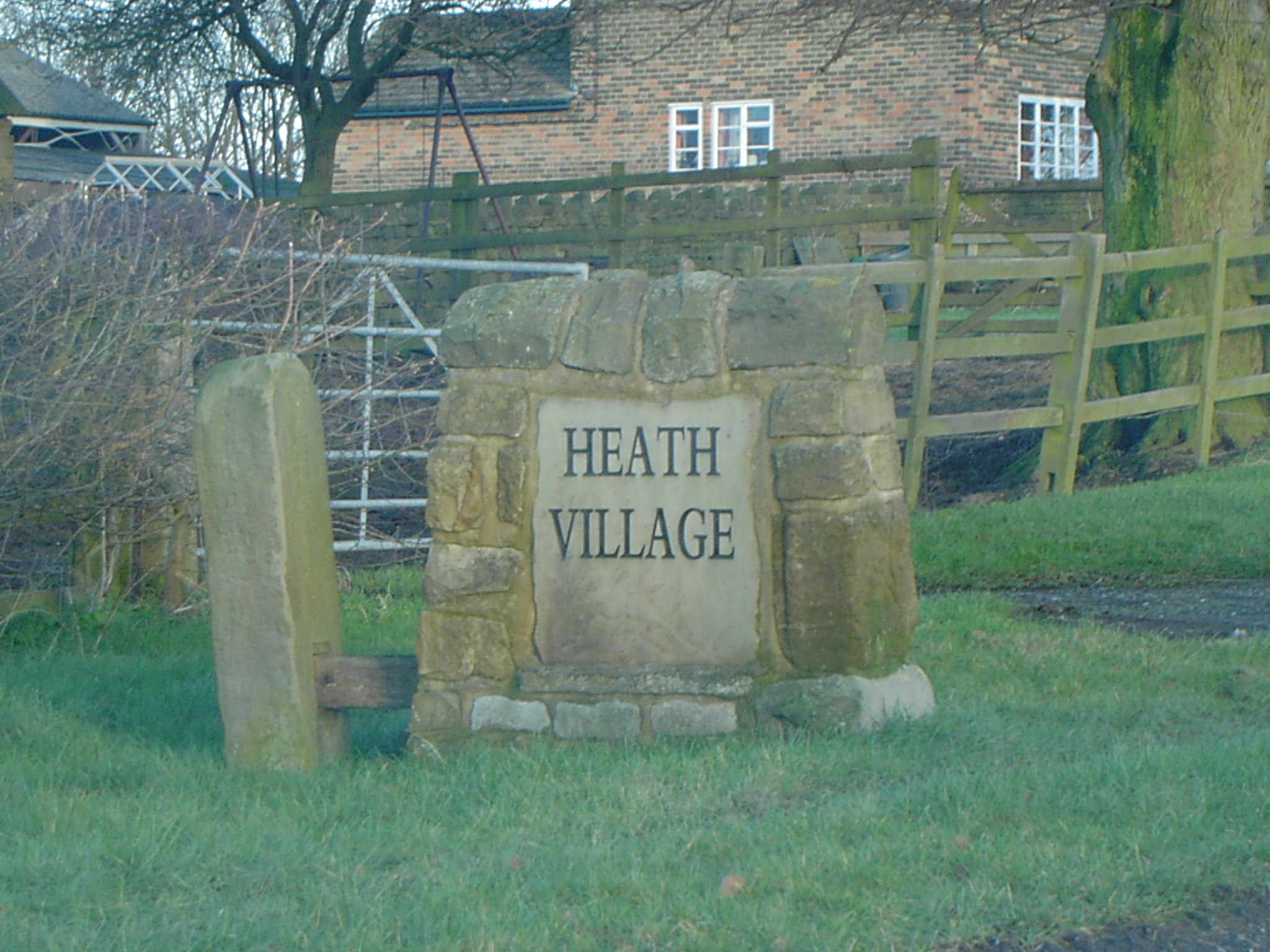
The gateway into Heath Village

== Location ==
Heath is immediately adjacent to junction 29 of the M1 motorway and the A617 dual carriageway into Chesterfield.

Close to Heath are the villages of Holmewood and Temple Normanton. The village is also near to Stainsby, host of the annual Stainsby Festival, and to the Sutton cum Duckmanton civil parish, which contains several villages, including Sutton Scarsdale.

As a result of the construction of the M1 Motorway in the 1960s, and more recently the A617 into Chesterfield, many of the linking roads from Heath to its neighbouring villages were severed. These severed roads still exist.

== History ==
In the Domesday Survey of 1086, two settlements are recorded around the present location of the village of Heath; they were called Lunt and Le Hethe. The two villages probably combined during the 12/13th century. However, relatively little change has taken place since then; maps from around 1609 show the village in almost its present layout.

The manor of the village was in the possession of Robert de Ferrars, the First Earl of Derby, who gave it to the monks of Garendon Abbey. It remained in their possession for almost 400 years. It then became bequeathed by Henry VIII to Thomas Manners, then to various families following him.

In the village, there are two buildings listed as Grade II, meaning they are of special archeological and historical interest. There is a thatched cottage located near to the entrance of the former Heath Comprehensive School. The second building is the remains of the original 12th-century church, which is separated from the village by the dual carriageway.

Much of the village is maintained by the Chatsworth Estate, with the traditional "Chatsworth Blue" doors and window frames signifying the properties leased from the estate.

The village had a railway station on the Great Central Railway, which partly followed the route taken by the A617. Both the line and the station closed in the 1960s as part of the 'Beeching axe'.

The buildings in the village are constructed mainly from the local cream-coloured sandstone, coupled with a variety of traditional roofing materials. In May 1977, the village was designated a conservation area.

== Customs ==
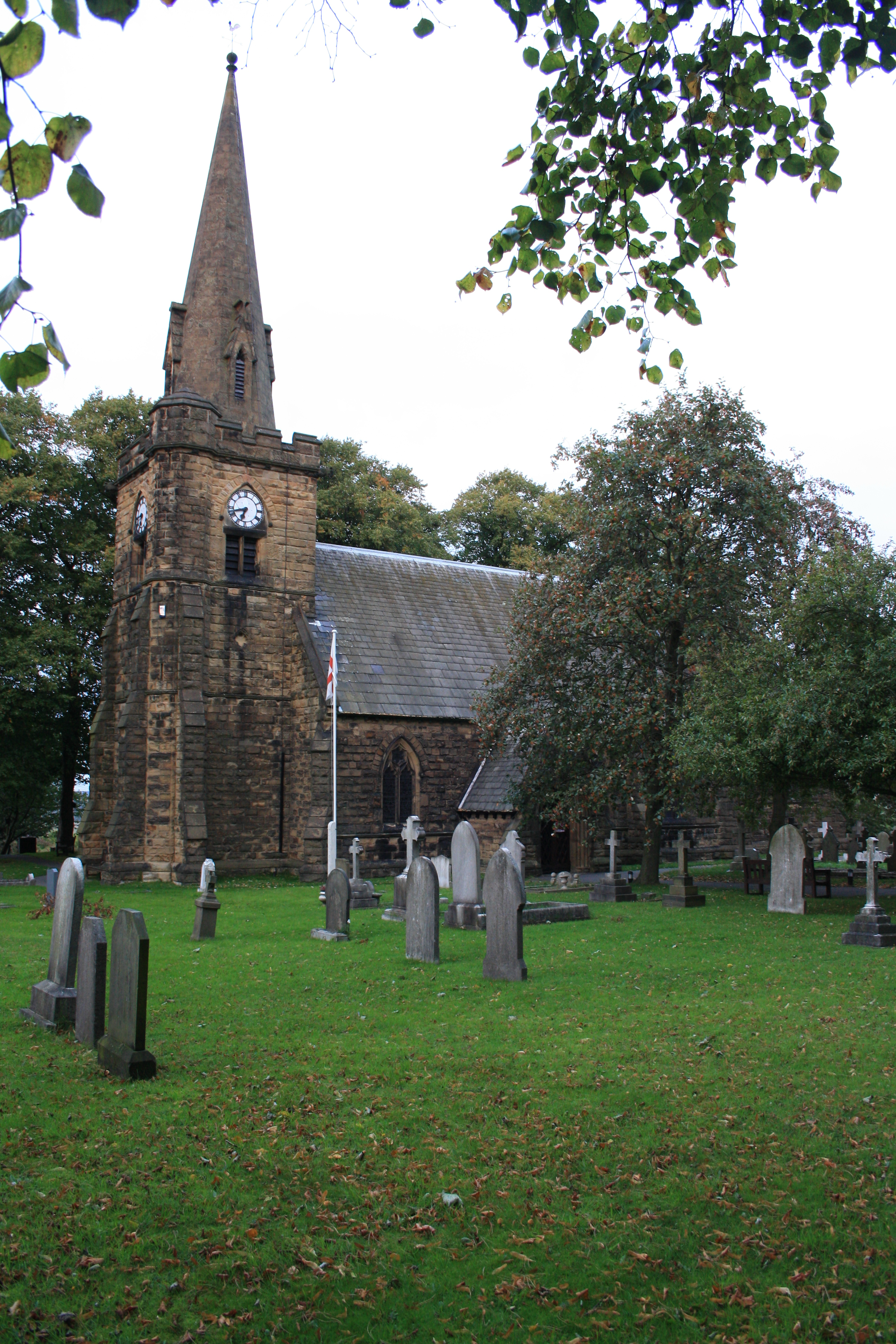
Heath

The Church of England is represented by All Saints Church, which has close links with St Albans in nearby Holmewood. Both congregations share the same vicar.

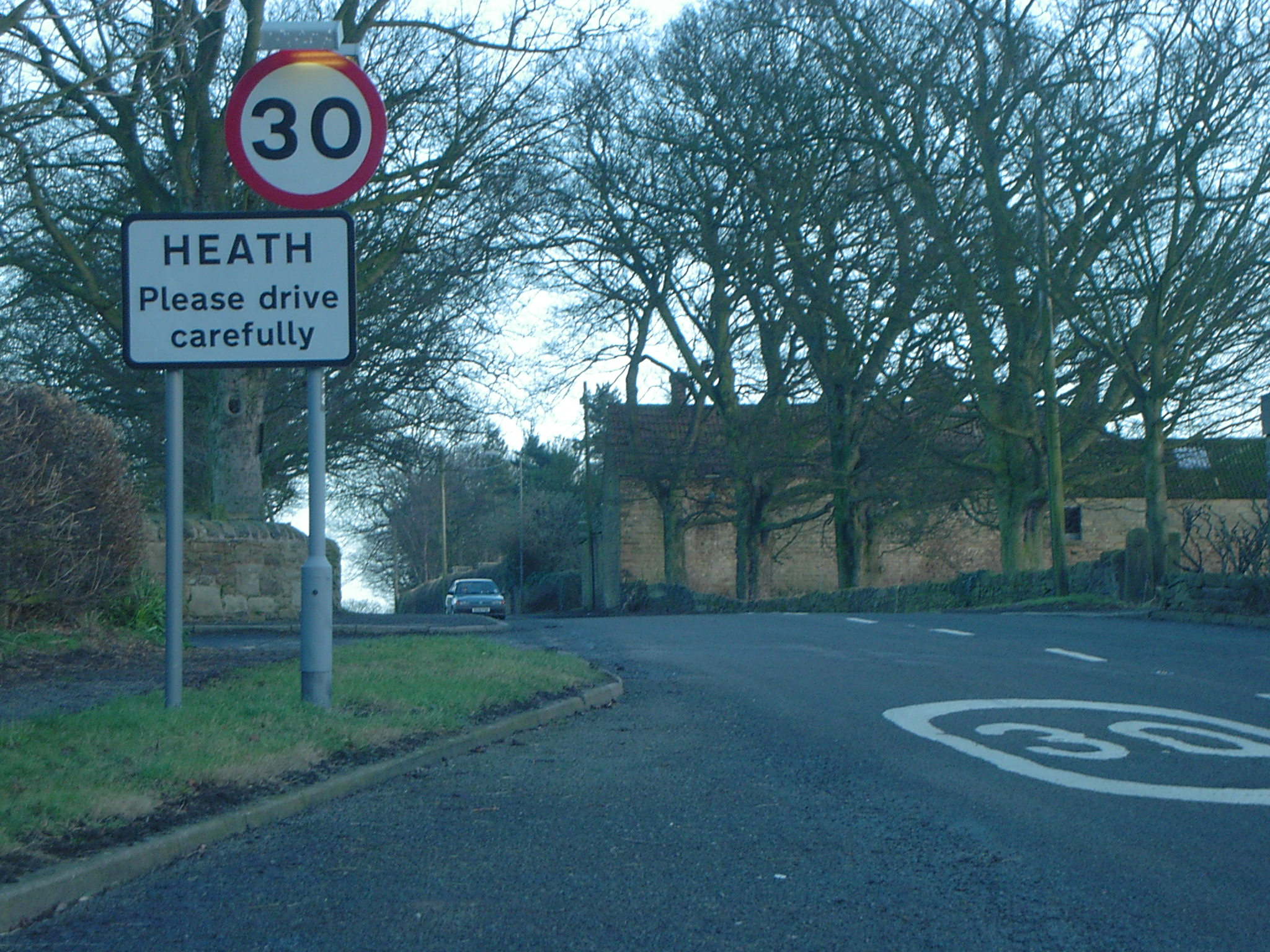
Heath

Modern education is provided by Heath Primary School which has stood on the site along Slack Lane since 1867, when boys and girls were taught in separate schools, but now a modern primary with Nursery and child care facilities.

== Economy ==
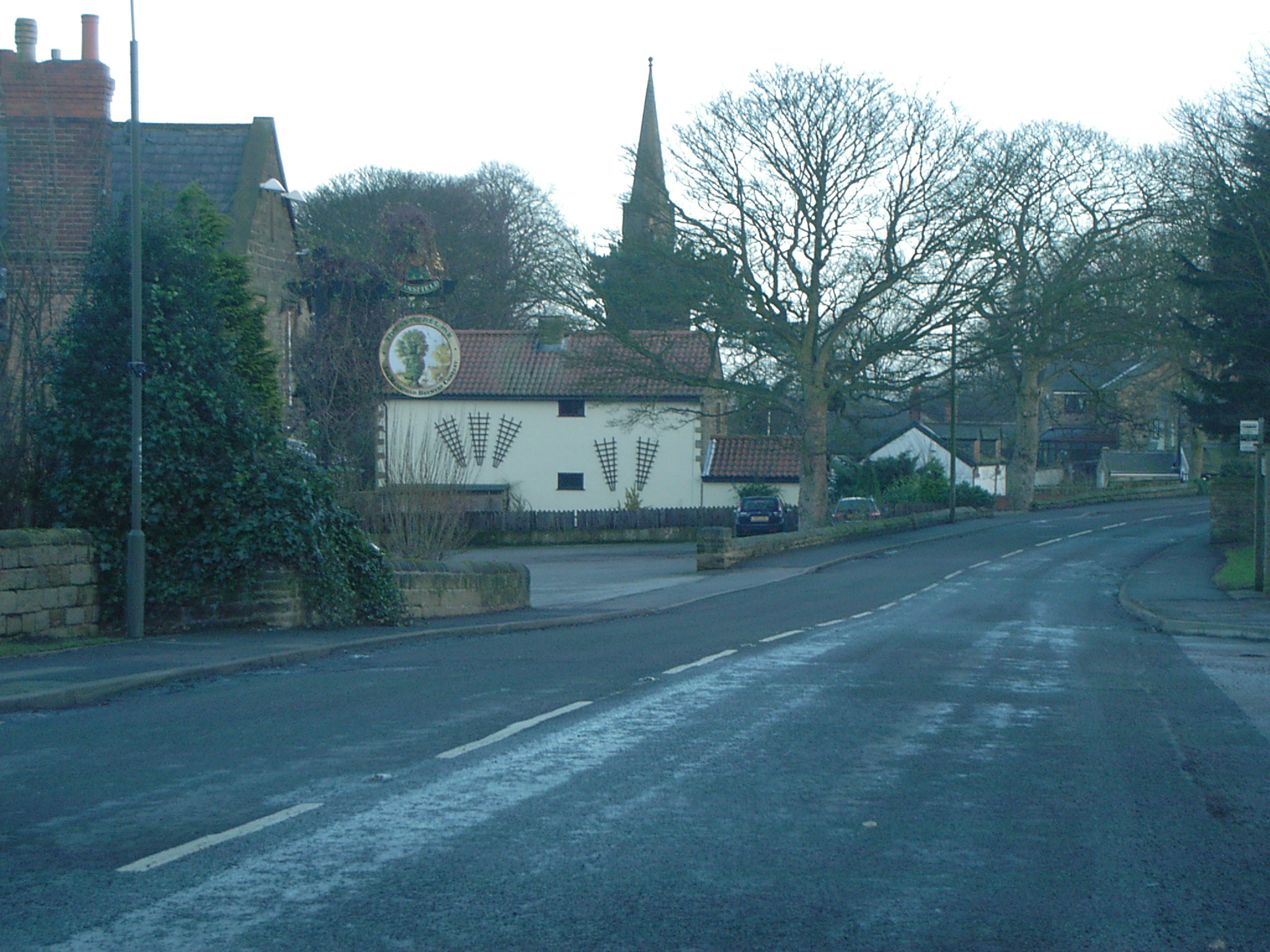
The Elm Tree Public House with Heath C of E Church in the background

The village of Heath once hosted a blacksmith, a cobbler, three public houses and a Post Office (closed in November 2009); only The Elm Tree public house and a petrol station on the outskirts of the village now remain. Many of the revamped private residences retain the names of the previous existence, such as The Old Reading Room and Smithy Cottage.

== See also ==
- Holmewood
- List of places in Derbyshire
- Listed buildings in Heath and Holmewood
