= Listed buildings in Glapwell =

Glapwell is a civil parish in the Bolsover District of Derbyshire, England. The parish contains three listed buildings that are recorded in the National Heritage List for England. All the listed buildings are designated at Grade II, the lowest of the three grades, which is applied to "buildings of national importance and special interest". The parish contains the village of Glapwell and the surrounding area, and the listed buildings consist of a farmhouse, and two structures associated with the demolished Glapwell Hall.

== Buildings ==
Name and location	Photograph	Date	Notes
Gatepiers at the entrance to Glapwell Hall; 53.19085°N 1.28315°W	—	Early 18th century	The gate piers at the entrance to the drive of the demolished Glapwell Hall are in sandstone. They are square and rusticated, and each pier has a plain base, a fluted frieze, and a moulded cap.
Glapwell Lane House; 53.19736°N 1.28289°W		Mid 18th century	A farmhouse in sandstone with chamfered quoins, and a tile roof with coped gables and moulded kneelers. There are two storeys and a symmetrical front of three bays, the middle bay projecting under a pedimented gable containing a lunette. The central doorway has a bracketed pediment, above which is a blind Venetian-style opening with a rusticated surround, a keystone, and a curved niche in the centre. The outer bays contain cross windows.
The Bothy, Glapwell Nurseries; 53.19218°N 1.28255°W	—	Late 18th century	A former pavilion or summer house in the grounds of the demolished Glapwell Hall. It is in sandstone and red brick, with sandstone dressings, and a roof of Welsh slate and pantile. There are two storeys and a symmetrical north front of three bays. In the centre is a doorway with an ogee-shaped head, above which is a panel with painted decoration and a moulded architrave, and a moulded pediment containing a blind lunette. In the outer bays are windows with brick wedge lintels.
