= Ellis Gee =

English footballer

Personal information
- Full name: Ellis Gee
- Date of birth: 15 June 1877
- Place of birth: Grassmoor, England
- Date of death: 1948 (aged 75–76)
- Position: Winger

Senior career*
Years	Team	Apps	(Gls)
1894–1895	Grassmoor Red Rose		
1895–1896	Sheepbridge Works		
1896–1897	Chesterfield Town		
1897–1900	Everton	31	(0)
1900–1907	Notts County	214	(21)
1907–1908	Reading		
1908	Ilkeston United		
Total		245	(21)
- * Club domestic league appearances and goals

Ellis Gee (15 June 1877 – 1948) was an English footballer who played in the Football League for Everton and Notts County.
