= St Leonard's Church, Scarcliffe =

Coordinates: 53°12′42.28″N 1°15′34.09″W

St Leonard’s Church, Scarcliffe
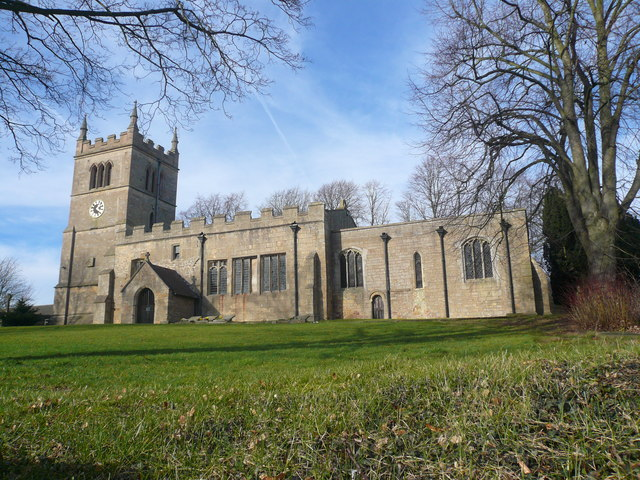
- St Leonard’s Church, Scarcliffe (photograph by Alan Heardman)
- St Leonard’s Church, Scarcliffe
- Location: Scarcliffe
- Country: England
- Denomination: Church of England

History
- Dedication: St Leonard

Architecture
- Heritage designation: Grade II* listed

Administration
- Diocese: Diocese of Derby
- Archdeaconry: Chesterfield
- Deanery: Bolsover and Staveley
- Parish: Scarcliffe

St Leonard's Church, Scarcliffe, is a Grade II* listed parish church in the Church of England in Scarcliffe, Derbyshire.

== History ==
The church dates from the 12th century. The tower was rebuilt in 1842 and there was a restoration later in the 19th century.

== Parish status ==
The church is in a joint parish with

- St Andrew's Church, Glapwell
- St John the Baptist's Church, Ault Hucknall
- St Luke's Church, Palterton

== Memorials ==
- Constantia de Frecheville (d. 1175)

== Organ ==
The pipe organ was installed by Albert Keates dating from 1908. A specification of the organ can be found on the National Pipe Organ Register.

== See also ==
- Grade II* listed buildings in Bolsover (district)
- Listed buildings in Scarcliffe
