= Listed buildings in Scarcliffe =

Scarcliffe is a civil parish in the Bolsover District of Derbyshire, England. The parish contains five listed buildings that are recorded in the National Heritage List for England. Of these, one is listed at Grade II*, the middle of the three grades, and the others are at Grade II, the lowest grade. The parish contains the villages of Scarcliffe and Palterton and the surrounding area. The listed buildings consist of a church, a small country house, and three farmhouses.

== Key ==
Grade	Criteria
II*	Particularly important buildings of more than special interest
II	Buildings of national importance and special interest

== Buildings ==
Name and location	Photograph	Date	Notes	Grade
St Leonard's Church; 53.21352°N 1.25951°W		12th century	The church has been altered and extended through the centuries, the tower was rebuilt in 1842 by H. I. Stevens, and it was restored in 1902. The church is built in sandstone with roofs of lead and Welsh slate, and consists of a nave with a clerestory, a north aisle, a south porch, a chancel and a west tower. The tower has four stages, moulded string courses, clasping buttresses, and a west doorway with a two-light window above. In the second stage is a sundial, the third stage contains a clock face, and in the top stage are three-light bell openings with hood moulds. At the top is an embattled parapet and corner pinnacles. There is also an embattled parapet on the south wall of the nave.	II*
Palterton Hall; 53.21045°N 1.29084°W		Early 18th century	A small country house in sandstone, with chamfered quoins, a moulded eaves cornice, and a Welsh slate roof. There are three storeys and five bays. The central doorway has a moulded architrave and a hood mould, and the windows are sashes in plain architraves.	II
Lilac Farmhouse; 53.21009°N 1.29118°W		Late 18th century	The farmhouse is in sandstone with quoins, and a tile roof with coped gables and moulded kneelers. There are three storeys and a symmetrical front of two bays. The central doorway has a plain surround, and the windows are sashes with stone wedge lintels.	II
Hall Farmhouse; 53.21340°N 1.26172°W		Early 19th century	The farmhouse is in sandstone, and has a Welsh slate roof with coped gables and plain kneelers. There are two storeys and four bays. On the front are two doorways with plain surrounds and rectangular fanlights, and the windows are sashes.	II
Manor Farmhouse; 53.21316°N 1.26287°W		Early 19th century	The farmhouse is in sandstone, and has a pantile roof with coped gables and plain kneelers. There are two storeys and a front of three symmetrical bays. In the centre is a two-storey gabled porch containing a doorway, over which are two small sash windows in segmental-headed recesses. The outer bays contain larger sash windows.	II
