= Doe Lea =

Village in Derbyshire, England

Coordinates: 53.192°N 1.314°W

- Village
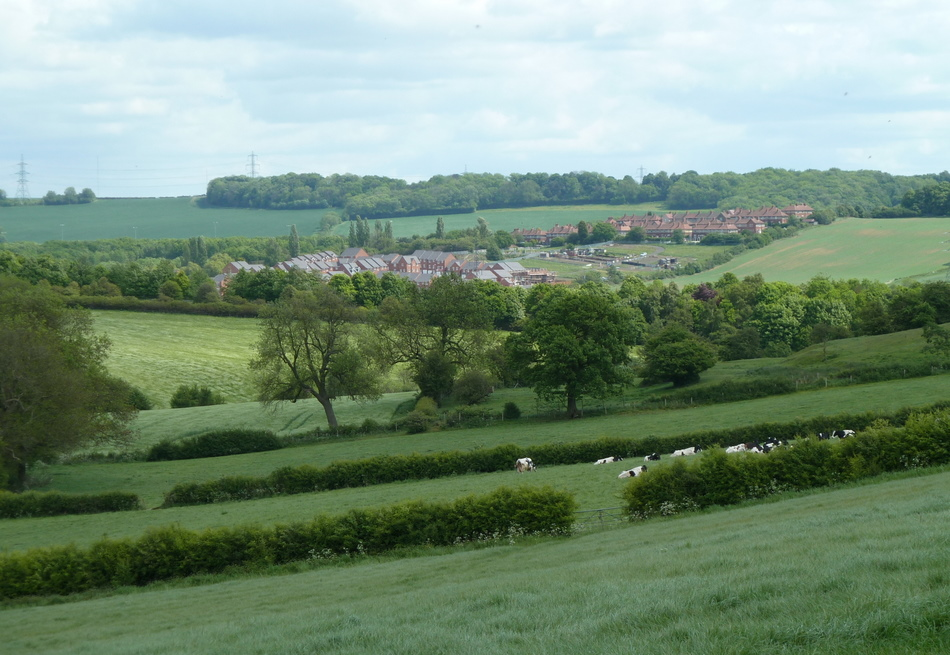
- A view of Doe Lea and Bramley Vale

- Location within Derbyshire
- OS grid reference: SK464662
- Civil parish: Ault Hucknall
- District: Bolsover
- Shire county: Derbyshire
- Region: East Midlands
- Country: England
- Sovereign state: United Kingdom
- Post town: CHESTERFIELD
- Postcode district: S44
- Police: Derbyshire
- Fire: Derbyshire
- Ambulance: East Midlands

Doe Lea is a small, linear village in the English county of Derbyshire. It is in the Bolsover district of the county and falls in the Ault Hucknall civil parish. The village runs along the old A617 road. A newer dual carriageway (currently the A617) runs parallel to it. The village is also immediately adjacent to junction 29 of the M1 motorway, like its neighbouring village Heath. Hardwick Hall is nearby. In 2005 the river and banks were given a makeover. A new path was put down, about 30 new trees were planted, the path was called Willow Walk and was opened by Dennis Skinner, MP. The work was carried out by The Doe Lea Valley Community Partnership, a group of volunteers from Doe Lea and surrounding areas. Work is still being carried out and is still being maintained by the group.

The village has a public house and a community centre. The River Doe Lea runs through the village, and Doe Lea local nature reserve is located nearby.

Doe Lea is near the villages of Bramley Vale, Glapwell, Heath and Stainsby; the latter hosts the annual Stainsby Festival.

== See also ==
- List of places in Derbyshire
