= Corbriggs =

Coordinates: 53.21°N 01.38°W

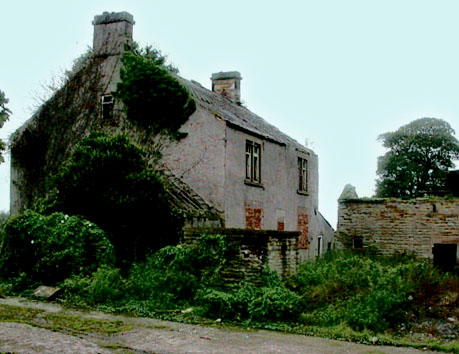
- The former Hill Farm, near Corbriggs.

- Location within Derbyshire
- OS grid reference: SK4168
- Civil parish: Grassmoor, Hasland and Winsick
- District: North East Derbyshire
- Shire county: Derbyshire
- Region: East Midlands
- Country: England
- Sovereign state: United Kingdom
- Post town: CHESTERFIELD
- Postcode district: S41
- Dialling code: 01246
- Police: Derbyshire
- Fire: Derbyshire
- Ambulance: East Midlands
- UK Parliament: North East Derbyshire

Corbriggs is a small settlement in Derbyshire, England. The appropriate civil parish is called Grassmoor, Hasland and Winsick. It is beside the A617 road and is 1 mile (2 km) southeast of Chesterfield.
