= Listed buildings in Heath and Holmewood =

Heath and Holmewood is a civil parish in the North East Derbyshire district of Derbyshire, England. The parish contains seven listed buildings that are recorded in the National Heritage List for England. All the listed buildings are designated at Grade II, the lowest of the three grades, which is applied to "buildings of national importance and special interest". The parish contains the villages of Heath and Holmewood, and the surrounding area. The listed buildings consist of farmhouses, a thatched cottage, parts of a former house, a church, and the ruins of a former church.

== Buildings ==
Name and location	Photograph	Date	Notes
Ruins of Heath Old Church; 53.19937°N 1.32465°W		12th century	The ruins are in sandstone and have a two-cell plan. The walls are incomplete, and the roof is absent. Features include dressed quoins, and jambs with chevron decoration and with roll moulding. There are stone seats in the porch.
Alcove and wall, Owlcotes Farm; 53.20808°N 1.34023°W	—	Late 16th century	The remaining part of a house possibly by Robert Smythson, it is in sandstone, and the wall has rounded copings. The alcove forms a seat, and consists of a moulded semicircular arch with a projecting impost band, and pilasters with sunk panels.
The Thatched Cottage; 53.19805°N 1.33183°W		17th century or earlier	The cottage is of cruck construction with some exposed crucks. It is in sandstone and brick, the main roof is thatched, and the lower wing has a slate roof. There is a single storey and attics, most of the windows are casements, and the lower wing has a dormer window.
High House Farmhouse; 53.20317°N 1.34722°W	—	Early 18th century	The farmhouse is in sandstone with a string course, a moulded cornice between the floors, pilasters at the angles, a parapet, and a tile roof with coped gables. There are two storeys, a double pile plan, and a front of five bays. The central doorway has a moulded surround and a fanlight, and the windows are sashes with moulded surrounds.
Owlcotes Farmhouse and wall 53.20664°N 1.34040°W		Early 18th century	The farmhouse is in sandstone, and has a roof of stone slate and tile. There are two storeys and four bays. Two of the bays are gabled, and the bay between is recessed and contains a doorway with a chamfered surround and a keystone. In the right bay is a casement window|, and the other windows are sashes. Attached to the south is a stone garden wall with chamfered copings.
Williamthorpe Hall Farmhouse Shop; 53.18804°N 1.35834°W	—	Early 18th century	A house, later a shop, in sandstone, with a roof of Welsh slate and stone slate. There are two storeys and two bays. The central doorway has a massive lintel and jambs, there is one sash window, and the other windows are mullioned.
All Saints' Church, Heath; 53.19891°N 1.33047°W		1853	The church, which was restored in 1882–86 by William Butterfield, is in sandstone with Welsh slate roofs. It consists of a nave with a south porch, a chancel with a north vestry, and a west steeple. The steeple has a tower with three stages, angle buttresses, a southwest stair turret, two-light bell openings, two of which incorporate clock faces, an embattled parapet, and a recessed spire with gabled lucarnes.
