= Stainsby =

Stainsby may refer to:

- Stainsby, Derbyshire, a village in Derbyshire, England
- Stainsby, Lincolnshire, a location in England
- Stainsby, North Yorkshire, an abandoned village in England
- Stainsby procedure, a form of arthroplasty

== People with the surname ==
- John Stainsby (1937–2000), an English professional footballer
- Les Stainsby (1898–1942), an Australian rules footballer
