= Heath and Holmewood =

Civil parish in Derbyshire, England

Coordinates: 53°11′N 1°21′W

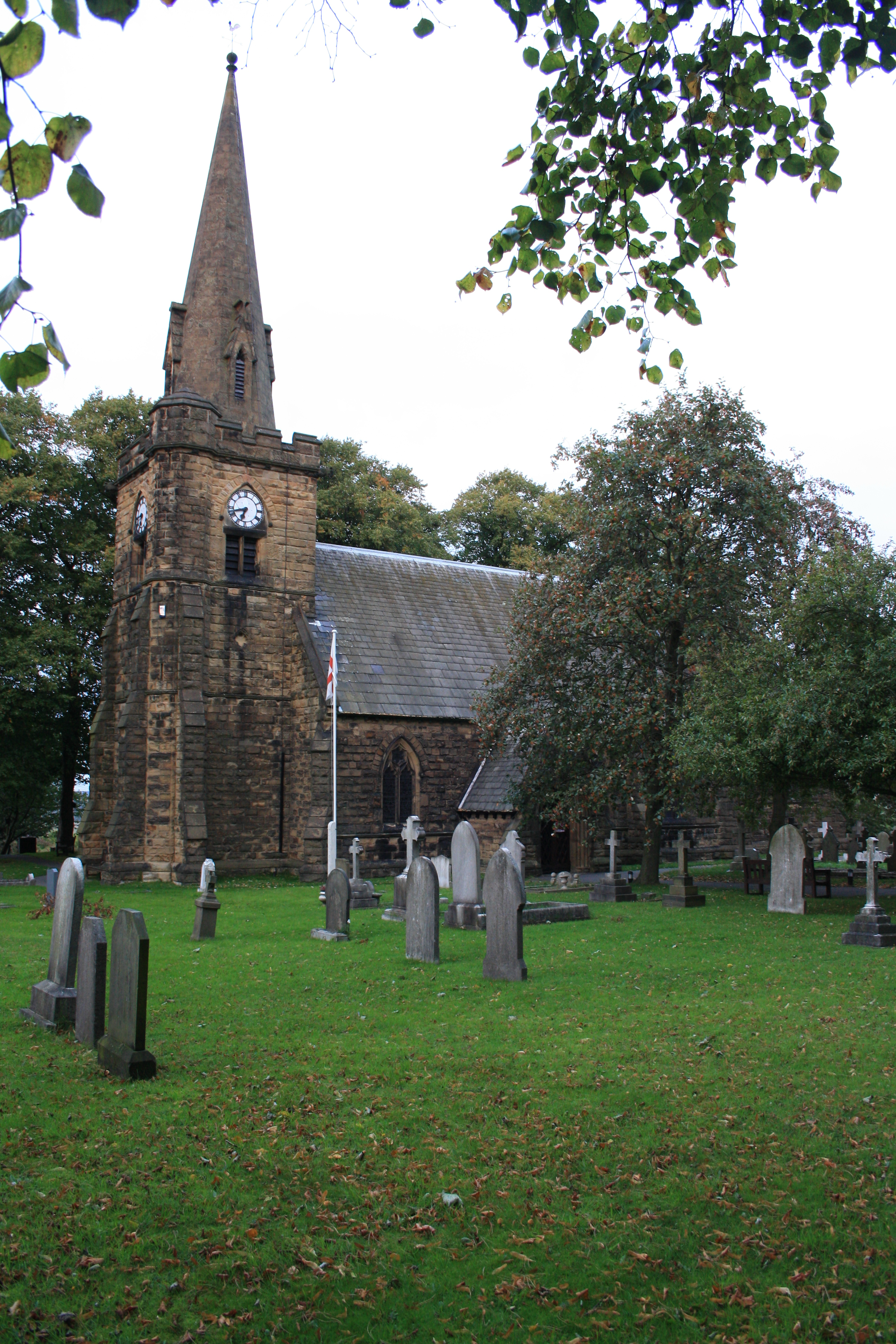
- Heath church

- Location within Derbyshire
- Population: 2,953 (2011 census)
- Civil parish: Heath and Holmewood
- District: North East Derbyshire
- Shire county: Derbyshire
- Region: East Midlands
- Country: England
- Sovereign state: United Kingdom

Heath and Holmewood, formerly just Heath is a civil parish forming part of the district of North East Derbyshire, in the county of Derbyshire, England.

Heath & Holmewood within the County of Derbyshire

As its name suggests, the main settlements in the parish are Heath and Holmewood. In 2011 it had a population of 2953.

On 5 January 1987 the parish was rename from "Heath" to "Heath and Holmewood".

== See also ==
- Listed buildings in Heath and Holmewood
