= Hardstoft =

Hamlet in Derbyshire, England

Coordinates: 53.164°N 1.344°W

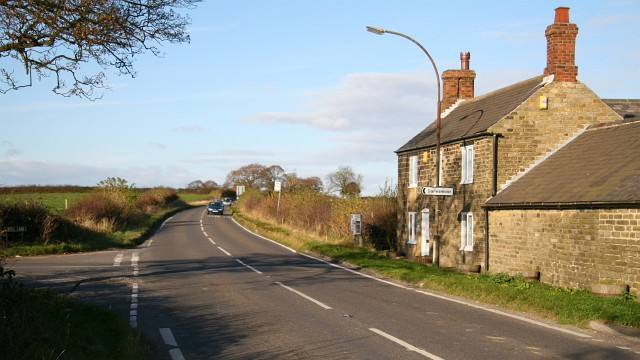
- Toll Bar Cottage, Hardstoft.

- Location within Derbyshire
- OS grid reference: SK439631
- Civil parish: Ault Hucknall
- District: Bolsover
- Shire county: Derbyshire
- Region: East Midlands
- Country: England
- Sovereign state: United Kingdom
- Post town: CHESTERFIELD
- Postcode district: S45
- Police: Derbyshire
- Fire: Derbyshire
- Ambulance: East Midlands

Hardstoft is a hamlet in Derbyshire, England. It is located four miles east of Clay Cross, on the B6039 road.

The Mexican Eagle Petroleum Company found small quantities of oil near Hardstoft in 1919 under encouragement from the British government.

== See also ==
- Listed buildings in Ault Hucknall
