= Abdy =

Hamlet in South Yorkshire, England

Coordinates: 53.484022°N 1.353521°W

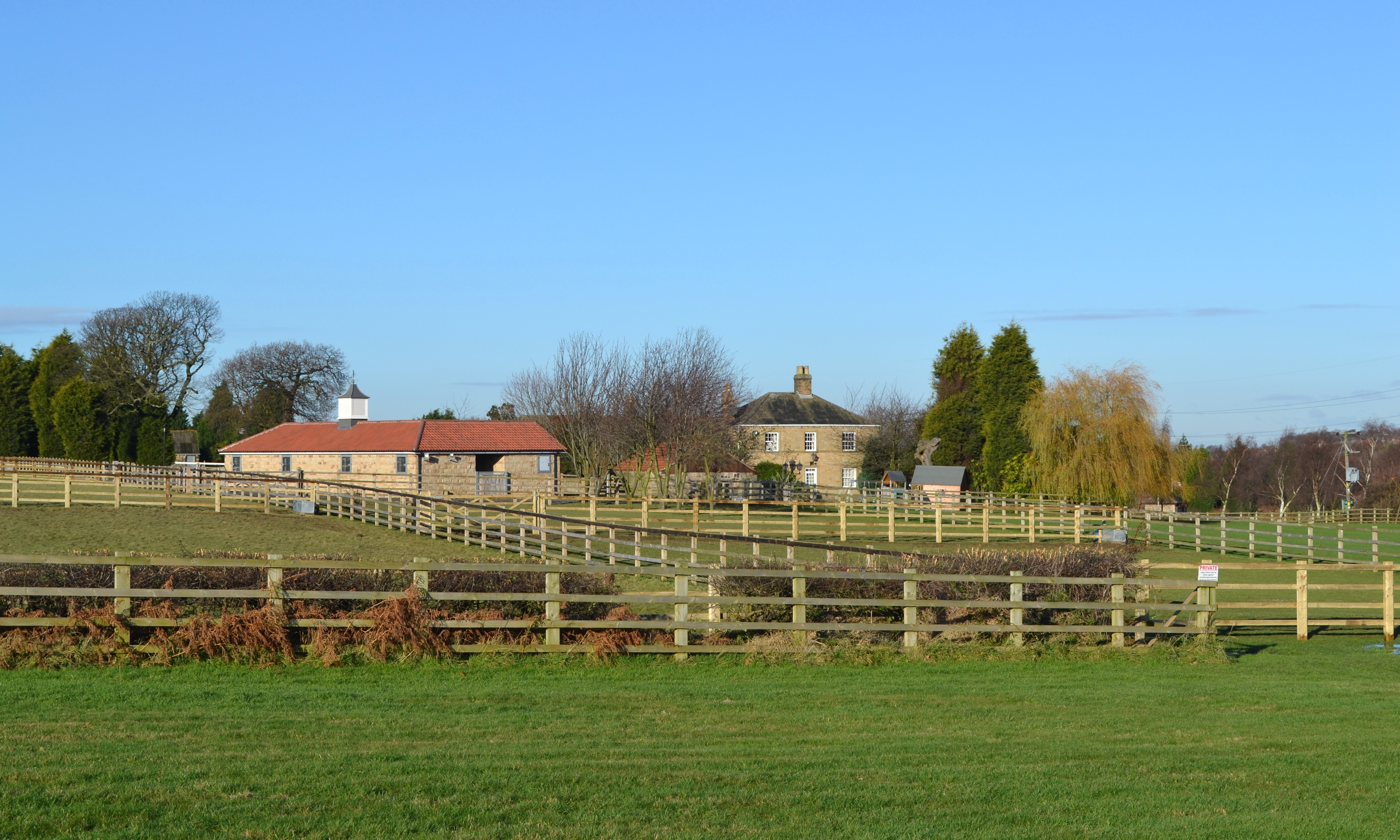
- Abdy Farm

- Location within South Yorkshire
- OS grid reference: SK4398
- Metropolitan borough: Rotherham
- Metropolitan county: South Yorkshire
- Region: Yorkshire and the Humber
- Country: England
- Sovereign state: United Kingdom
- Post town: ROTHERHAM
- Postcode district: S62
- Police: South Yorkshire
- Fire: South Yorkshire
- Ambulance: Yorkshire

Abdy is a hamlet in South Yorkshire, England. Abdy is located about 2 miles (3.2 km) west of Swinton.

The earliest reference to Abdy is in the 13th century in the cartulary of Monk Bretton Priory. It is possible that it was founded as a medieval grange and that its name is derived from the French for abbey (in this case Monk Bretton Priory or Roche Abbey).

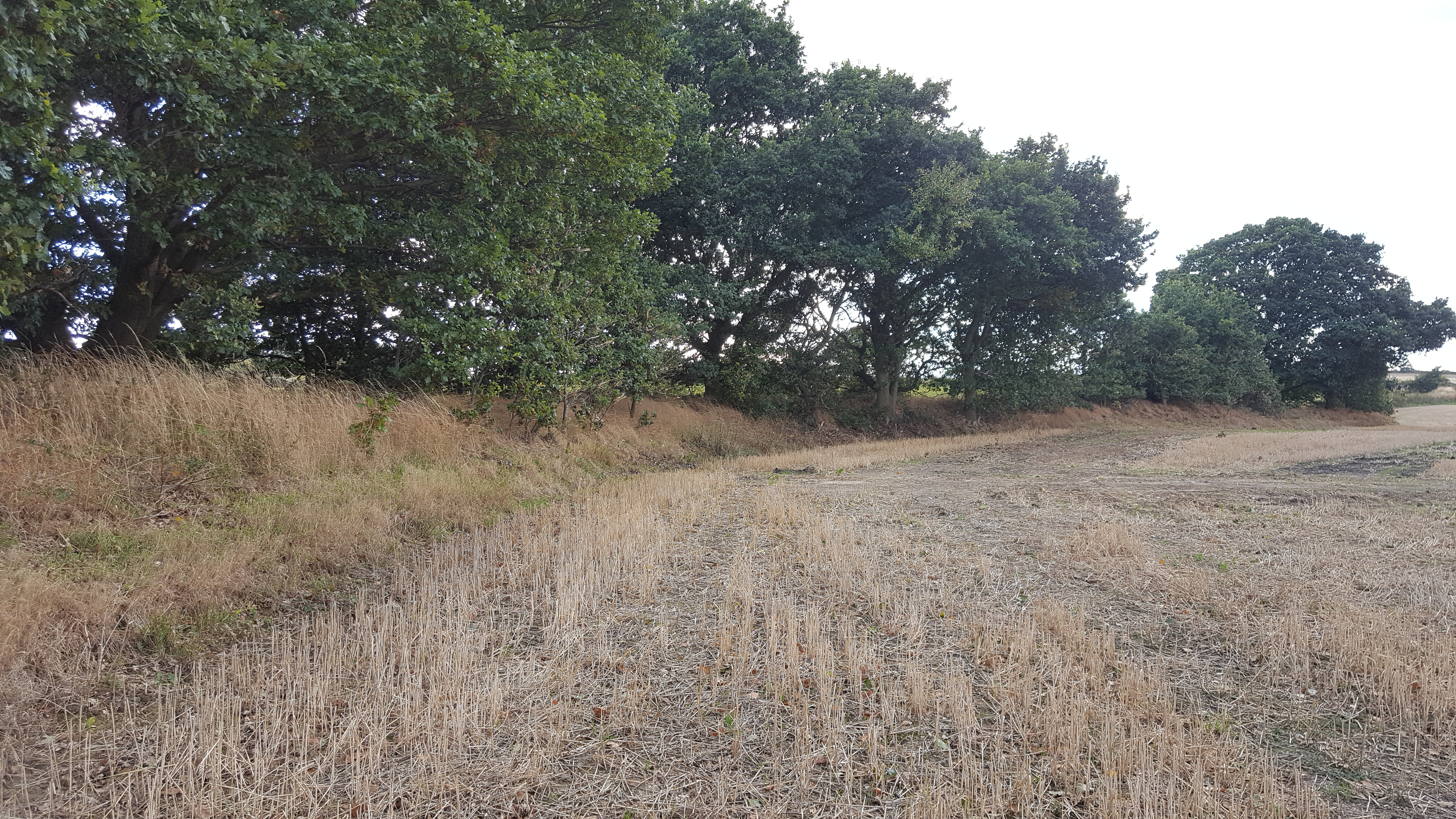
Section of Roman earthworks near Abdy

Earthworks for a Roman Ridge Dyke runs along the southern and eastern sides of Abdy. To the north of the village is Wath Golf Course.
