= Stansby =

Stansby is a surname, derived from places in England called Stainsby. Notable people with the surname include:

- JoAnna Stansby, American bridge player
- Lew Stansby (born 1940), American bridge player
- William Stansby (1572–1638), English printer and publisher
