= Winsick =

Hamlet in Derbyshire, England

Coordinates: 53.212°N 1.391°W

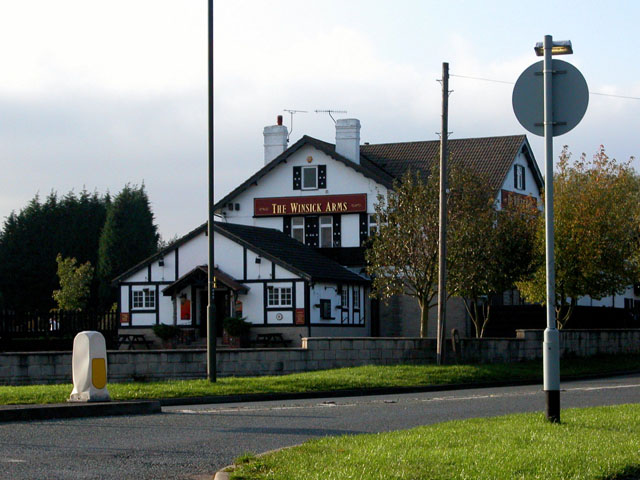
- The Winsick Arms, Winsick.

- Location within Derbyshire
- OS grid reference: SK407684
- Civil parish: Grassmoor, Hasland and Winsick
- District: North East Derbyshire
- Shire county: Derbyshire
- Region: East Midlands
- Country: England
- Sovereign state: United Kingdom
- Post town: CHESTERFIELD
- Postcode district: S41
- Dialling code: 01246
- Police: Derbyshire
- Fire: Derbyshire
- Ambulance: East Midlands
- UK Parliament: North East Derbyshire

Winsick is a hamlet in Derbyshire, England. It is located on the B6039 Mansfield Road, 2 miles south of Chesterfield. It is part of the civil parish of Grassmoor, Hasland and Winsick.
