= Ben Twell =

English footballer

Personal information
- Date of birth: 30 August 1903
- Place of birth: Temple Normanton, England
- Date of death: 1986 (aged 82–83)
- Height: 5 ft 7 in (1.70 m)
- Position: Forward

Senior career*
Years	Team	Apps	(Gls)
1923–1924	Staveley Town		
1924–1925	Matlock Town		
1925–1926	Hardwick Colliery		
1926–1927	Grassmoor Ivanhoe		
1927–1929	Grimsby Town	3	(1)
1929–1931	Southport	21	(25)
1931–1932	New Brighton	11	(1)
1932–1933	Fleetwood		
1933–1934	Sutton Town		
1934–1936	Temple Normanton Old Boys		
1936–1937	Clay Cross Rangers		
1937–193?	Temple Normanton Red Rose		
- * Club domestic league appearances and goals

Ben Twell (30 August 1903 – 1986) was an English professional footballer who played as a forward. Most notably he was a forward for Southport, scoring a hat trick in three consecutive games. He scored 25 goals in 22 appearances there, before being transferred to New Brighton.
