= Stainsby Mill =

Watermill in Stainsby, Derbyshire, England

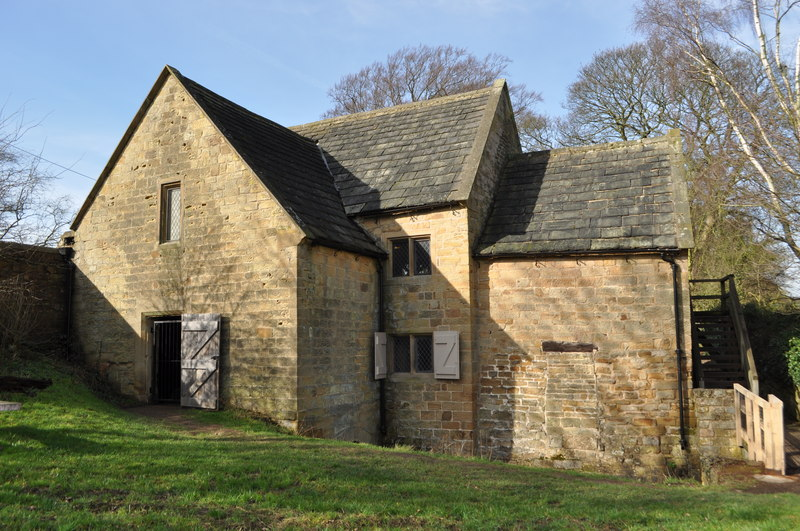

- Location within Derbyshire
- 53°10′58″N 1°19′14″W
- Type: Watermill
- Location: Stainsby
- OS grid reference: SK 45562 65319

History
- Built: 1846–1850

Site notes
- Area: Derbyshire, England
- Owner: National Trust

Listed Building – Grade II
- Official name: Stainsby Mill
- Designated: 22 August 1969
- Reference no.: 1052316

Stainsby Mill is a 19th-century flour watermill in Doe Lea, Chesterfield, Derbyshire, England. The mill, which has been restored to full working order, is a Grade II listed building and is under the ownership of the National Trust. The mill is part of the Hardwick Hall estate.

== History ==
A mill on this site appears to have existed from the early 13th century. Originally all the water for the mill came from the River Doe Lea which fed the Miller's Pond on the Hardwick estate. By 1762 the Stainsby Pond, fed by the Stainsby Brook, had been constructed and the water also fed into the Mill Pond which was situated on the other side of the road from the mill. Water was allowed into the mill race by sluice gates under the road.

=== The current mill ===
By the 1840s the mill had become dilapidated and William Cavendish, 6th Duke of Devonshire decided it needed rebuilding and re-equipping. The mill was substantially rebuilt in dressed stone from the Hardwick Estate and fitted with modern machinery, including a 17 ft (5.2 m) diameter breast shot water wheel, between 1846 and 1850. It was in operation for a century until it finally closed in 1952. Up till 1865, the millers were members of the Saunders family who had worked the mill since 1689. Subsequently, the tenancy passed into the Hitch family for the rest of its working life, the last miller being William Hitch.

=== Preservation and restoration ===
As a result of the death of the 10th Duke of Devonshire in 1950, as part of the Hardwick Estate, the mill was passed to the government in lieu of death duties. It was given to the National Trust who carried out a partial restoration in 1976. As a result of a report on the mill's future by the Ault Hucknall Environment Group in 1990, a full restoration to working order was commenced in 1991 with the mill being opened to the public again in 1992.
