= Ault Hucknall =

Village in Derbyshire, England

Coordinates: 53.182°N 1.302°W

- Village
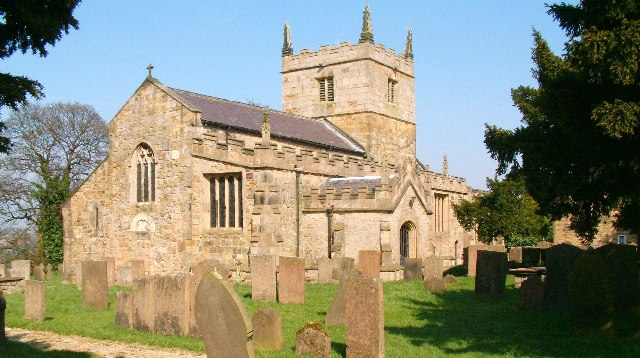
- St John the Baptist church

- Location within Derbyshire
- Population: 1,053 (Including Astwith, Bramley Vale, Doe Lea and Stainsby. 2011)
- OS grid reference: SK467652
- District: Bolsover
- Shire county: Derbyshire
- Region: East Midlands
- Country: England
- Sovereign state: United Kingdom
- Post town: CHESTERFIELD
- Postcode district: S44
- Dialling code: 01246
- Police: Derbyshire
- Fire: Derbyshire
- Ambulance: East Midlands
- UK Parliament: Bolsover

Ault Hucknall (Old English: Hucca's nook of land) is a village and civil parish in the Bolsover district of Derbyshire, England. The population of the civil parish at the 2011 census was 1,053.

Local residents describe the settlement as the 'smallest village in England', as it consists of only a church and three houses. (Note: although as a village is not legally defined in England, this is not a provable claim – many would refer to it as a hamlet.) The philosopher Thomas Hobbes was interred within Ault Hucknall's St John the Baptist Church following his death in 1679.

Hardwick Hall is within the parish boundary, which also contains the settlements of Astwith, Bramley Vale, Doe Lea, Hardstoft, Rowthorne and Stainsby.

== See also ==
- Listed buildings in Ault Hucknall
- List of places in Derbyshire
- Murder of Barbara Mayo, unsolved murder of a woman which occurred in the village in 1970
