= Stainsby, Derbyshire =

Village in Derbyshire, England

Coordinates: 53.184°N 1.327°W

Stainsby
- Village
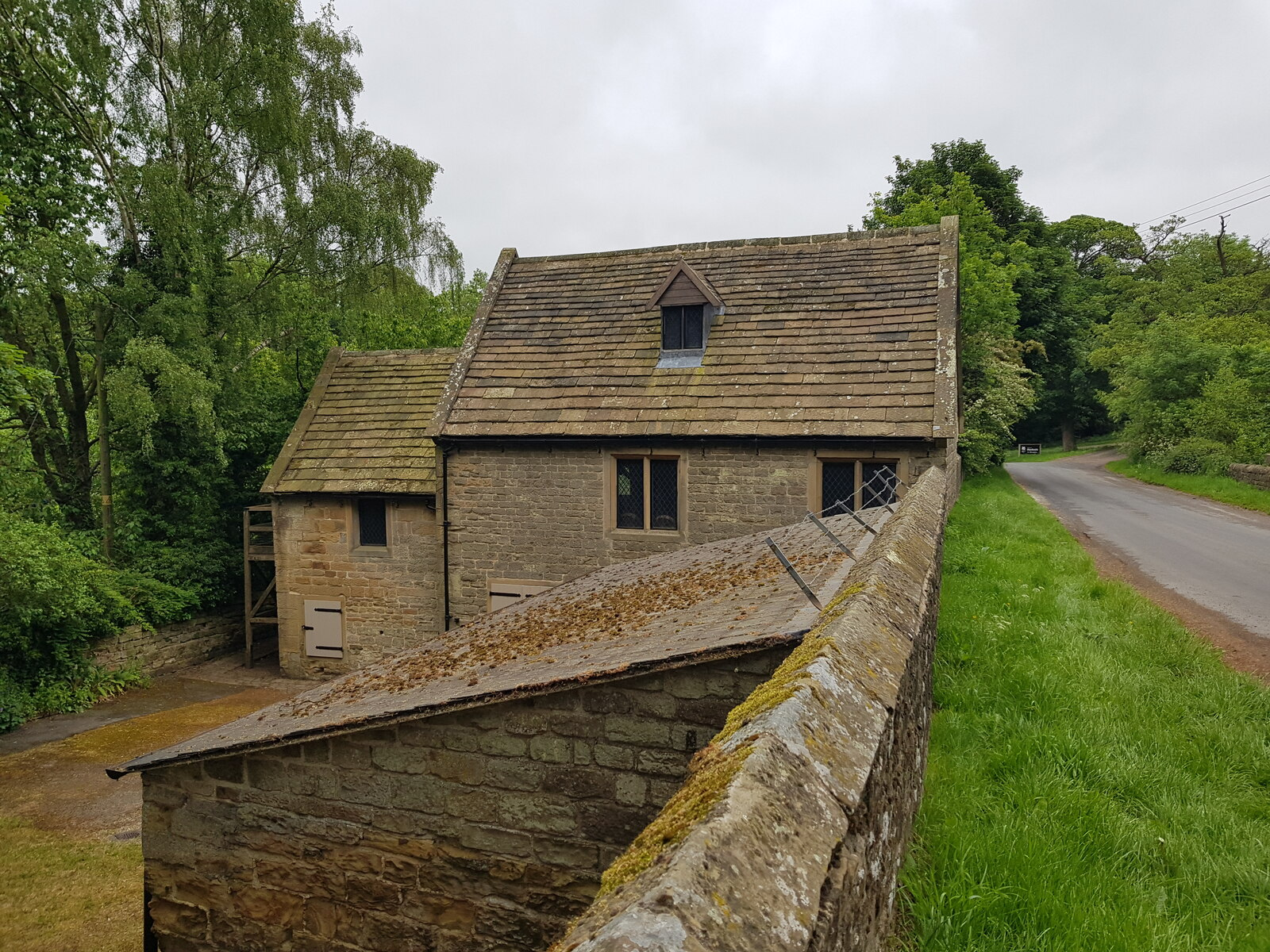
- Stainsby Mill, close to Hardwick Hall

- Location within Derbyshire
- OS grid reference: SK450654
- Civil parish: Ault Hucknall
- District: Bolsover
- Shire county: Derbyshire
- Region: East Midlands
- Country: England
- Sovereign state: United Kingdom
- Post town: CHESTERFIELD
- Postcode district: S44
- Police: Derbyshire
- Fire: Derbyshire
- Ambulance: East Midlands

Stainsby is a small village in Derbyshire, England. It is near Chesterfield and Bolsover, and the villages of Heath and Doe Lea. The village population is included in the civil parish of Ault Hucknall. The M1 motorway skirts past the village. In 1870-72 it had a population of 101.

The village is near the National Trust property of Hardwick Hall. In the hall's estate is Stainsby Mill, a fully working 19th-century water mill.

The village was known as Steinesbei in the Domesday survey of 1086, where it was in the ancient wapentake of Scarsdale, listed together with several manors including Beighton and Sutton Scarsdale under the lands of Roger de Poitou. It was surrounded to the north by a semi-circular moat with banks and ramparts, approximately eight feet in depth. Some of this still remains visible, although in a much reduced form. This is known as "The Earthwork" and is a designated scheduled monument. By 1273, the wapentake was called the hundred of Scarsdale.

The manor of Stainsby was owned by the Savage family, whose members played prolific roles in the king's armies and in society. A John Savage was knighted, probably by Henry V, for his service at the Battle of Agincourt on 15 October 1415. Whilst another Sir John commanded the left wing of the Tudor army at the Battle of Bosworth and became a Knight of the Garter. Thomas Savage was consecrated Bishop of Rochester, then London (where he also became Chaplain to King Henry VII) and was then made Archbishop of York and Primate of England a position he held from 1501 until his death in 1507. One of the Savages was involved in the Babington Plot to kill Queen Elizabeth I and put Mary, Queen of Scots, on the throne. Along with the Babington family of Dethick, their deeds resulted in many of them being executed. Around 1580, the manor passed from the hands of the family, eventually being sold on to William Cavendish.

Stainsby hosts the Stainsby Festival, a folk festival which takes place in the summer. The festival celebrated its 40th year in 2008.
