= Stainsby Festival =

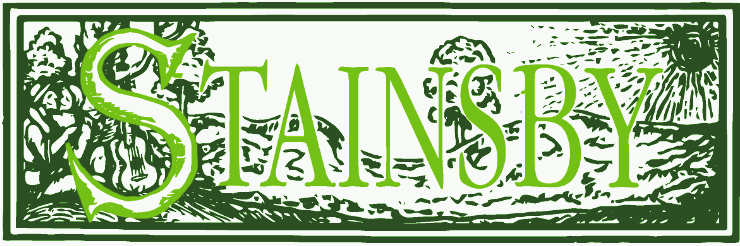

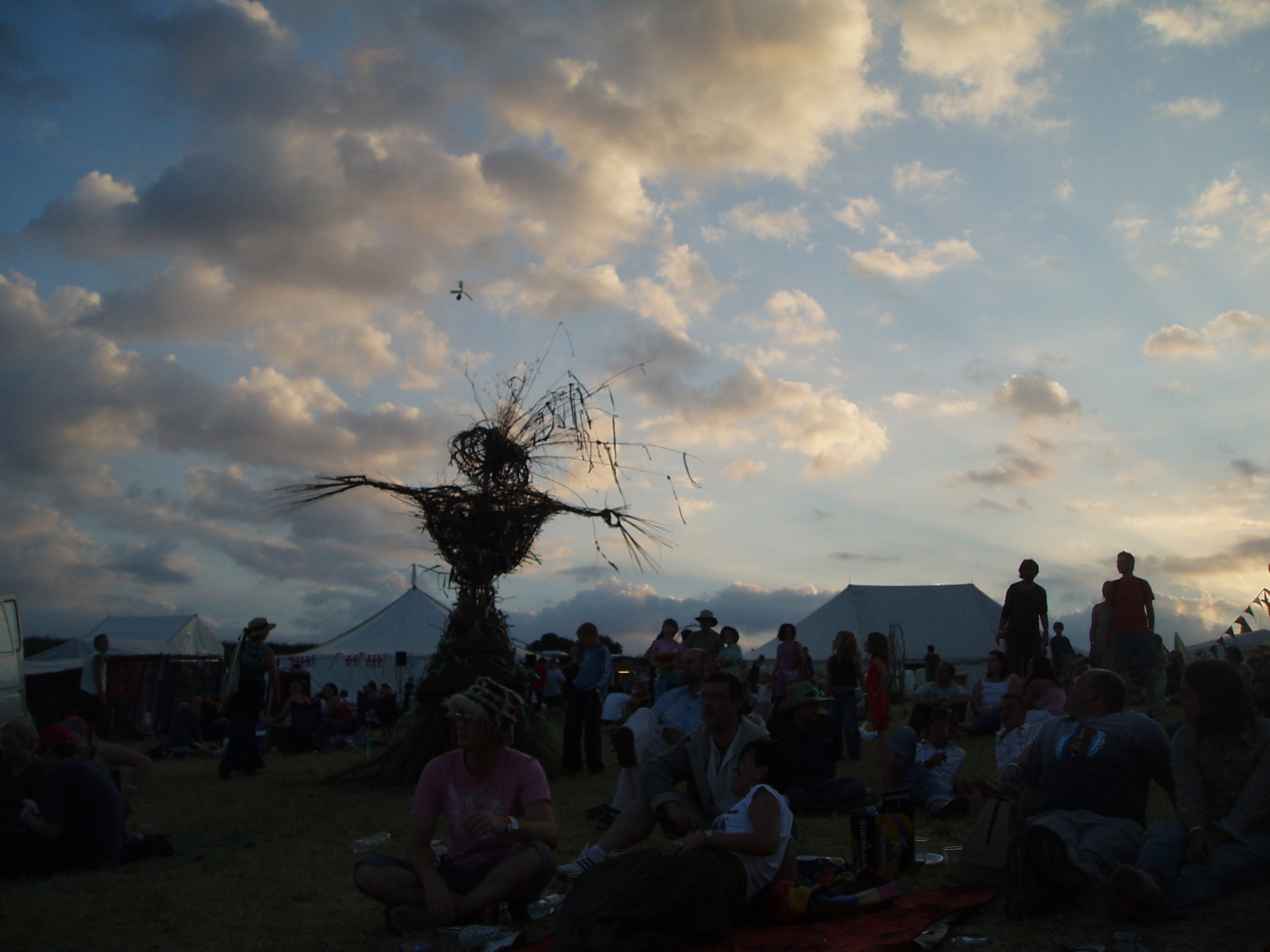
- Stainsby Festival in 2005
- Status: Active
- Genre: Folk Music Festival
- Frequency: Annually
- Locations: Stainsby, Derbyshire
- Country: United Kingdom
- Years active: 58
- Most recent: 18 July – 20 July 2025
- Next event: 17 July - 19 July 2026
- Patron: Stainsby Folk Group
- Website: http://www.stainsbyfestival.org/

Stainsby Festival is an annual folk music festival held in the Derbyshire village of Stainsby, England. It usually takes place in July over three days.

== History ==
Stainsby Festival was first held in 1969 at the old school in Stainsby village. It was launched by Stainsby Arts Centre, which had been set up in 1967 and closed in 1971 due to council cuts and was organised by Ann Syrett and Bob Walker among others. The idea of a weekend folk music festival was successful and so continued each year. In 1973, it won the Melody Maker award for 'worst bogs at any festival'. In 1974, the school building was leased by the National Trust to a boys' school from Bradford, who did not want to host the festival.

However, it continued after Dot Brunt of Brunt's Farm offered the use of her fields. The 1975 festival was put on successfully without dropping a year, and over the following years the date of the festival moved from early July to the August bank holiday, before settling on its current date, starting on the third Friday in July. In 2000, Dot Brunt died, but its second benefactor, Paddy Lane, bought the house and fields in order to keep the festival alive.

Due to the COVID-19 pandemic, the festival was not held in 2020 or 2021, but made a comeback to the fields in 2022. In 2020, the festival was run online with a semi-live run through on the Facebook page and group.

From the beginning of 2023, the fields that the festival is held on were purchased by Stainsby Folk Group from Paddy Lane, after running multiple fundraising campaigns including a "Llama Karma" event, bucket collections at the festival, the "Glorious 100" which ran for 3 years, which one sponsor offered to match the donations in memory of Ben Daglish, who was a trustee at the festival. There were also further donations from other companies.

== Activities ==
It has music venues and several family-oriented events, with children's storytelling tents, group rhythm workshops, and face-painting activities. Camping is available in a field adjoining the main arena.

The festival has three stages. A large marquee constitutes the main stage, and there is a tent with a bar that makes up the second, known as 'The Hat Block'. Each year's lineup is varied but tends to be predominantly acoustic folk. Since 2012 the festival has included in its programme, Earthwork, a series of talks and workshops. There is a smaller tent called 'The Third Thing' hosting multi-media events, poetry, theatre, spoken word, and other workshops.

The festival usually ends with a procession, often involving the use of fire. In 2005, the procession was centered on a flame, apparently originating from the fires of Hiroshima after the atomic bomb was dropped. This coincided with the 60th anniversary of the end of the Second World War.
