= Temple Normanton =

Village in Derbyshire, England

Coordinates: 53.2031°N 1.3778°W

- Village
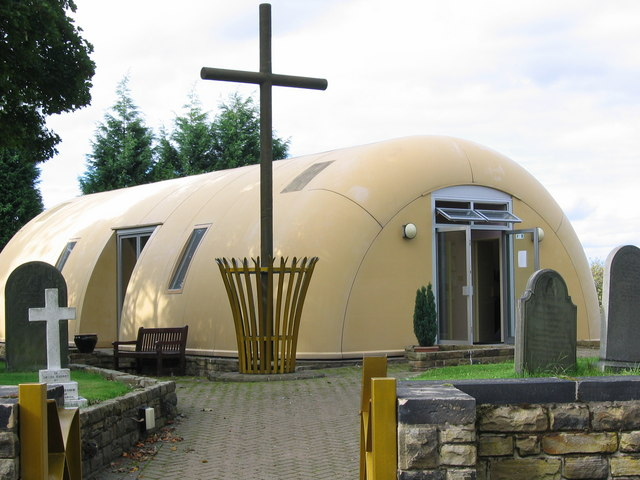
- St James the Apostle Church, Temple Normanton.

- Location within Derbyshire
- Population: 490 (2011)
- OS grid reference: SK415675
- Civil parish: Temple Normanton
- District: North East Derbyshire
- Shire county: Derbyshire
- Region: East Midlands
- Country: England
- Sovereign state: United Kingdom
- Post town: CHESTERFIELD
- Postcode district: S42
- Dialling code: 01246
- Police: Derbyshire
- Fire: Derbyshire
- Ambulance: East Midlands
- UK Parliament: North East Derbyshire

Temple Normanton is a village and a civil parish in the North East Derbyshire district in Derbyshire, England. The population of the civil parish at the 2011 census was 490.

The village sits on a prominent hilltop three miles (5 km) south of Chesterfield. It is composed of two villages formerly known as North Normanton and Little Normanton. It is close to the villages of Heath, Holmewood, Grassmoor and the civil parish of Sutton cum Duckmanton. The Chesterfield suburb of Hasland is close by.

The Manor of Normanton at the time of the Domesday Survey was in the hands of the King. Later, it passed to the Order of the Knights Templar from whom it derived its prefix 'Temple'.

When the Knights Templar were dissolved in the early 14th century, the land and property of the village passed to the Order of the Hospital of St John at Yeaveley Preceptory. Later, Henry VIII charged the Order of St John with disloyalty, and it was dissolved. The village then passed to the hands of the crown.

In 1846, Robert Arkwright was Lord of the Manor and principal owner. At the time the village had 500 acres (2.0 km^{2}) of land, 29 houses and 132 inhabitants.

In the Borough Library at Derby is held a parchment roll comprising 70 sheets stitched together. This records the proceedings of the Manor Court of Temple Normanton from 1447 to 1518. John Babbington is mentioned as a Knight of St John, and many of the roads listed in the roll are still traceable on present day Ordnance Survey maps.

Early in the industrial age the area became known for coal mining, with numerous collieries located in the vicinity. These included the massive Bonds Main Colliery which lasted from 1896 to 1949. The Chesterfield loop of the Great Central Railway which also ran through the area, opened in June 1892. A Bonds Main Platform was provided for mine workers, but the nearest public station was located in Grassmoor and this closed in October 1940. The line itself closing to passenger traffic in March 1963. Sections remained for a while serving the various collieries but as these closed, so the line disappeared completely.

Modern Temple Normanton includes a primary school, a church, a cemetery and a MOT garage, but no shops. St James the Apostle Church is a glass-fibre building of 1986; it is the fourth parish church on the site. There are regular buses to Chesterfield, Alfreton, Mansfield and Nottingham.

== See also ==
- List of places in Derbyshire
