= S postcode area =

Postcode prefix within the United Kingdom

Sheffield
- Postcode area
- Location within the United Kingdom
- Coordinates: 53.397°N 1.407°W
- Sovereign state: United Kingdom
- Postcode area: S
- Postcode area name: Sheffield
- Post towns: 8
- Postcode districts: 52
- Postcode sectors: 248
- Postcodes (live): 33,439
- Postcodes (total): 49,099
- Statistics as at May 2020

The S postcode area, also known as the Sheffield postcode area, is a group of postcode districts in England, which are subdivisions of eight post towns. These cover most of South Yorkshire (including Sheffield, Barnsley, Rotherham and Mexborough), parts of north Derbyshire (including Chesterfield, Dronfield and the Hope Valley) and north-west Nottinghamshire (including Worksop), plus a small part of West Yorkshire. The S postcode area is one of six with a population above 1 million.

Mail for the S postcode area is processed at Sheffield Mail Centre, along with mail for the DN, LN, and HU postcode areas.

== History ==
For 1857–1868 an S sector of the London postal district existed.

Similarly, there were also S-prefixed postal districts in the compass-based system used in Glasgow: Glasgow S1, S2, S3 and S4, which later became G41 to G44.

Three postcode districts were split and separated into ten new postcode districts. These were:

- S20, formed out of S19. The code was changed while the area remained the same to avoid confusion as the sectors were redrawn.
- S21, S25 and S26, formed out of S31.
- S32 to S36, formed out of S30.

The S64 district covering the Mexborough post town was originally earmarked for use as DN13, which has never been used.

== Coverage ==
As with many postcode areas in the United Kingdom, the S Area is numbered in various clusters. S1-S14 cover the core urban area of Sheffield, with S17-S36 covering more suburban or rural areas within Sheffield's environs. Postcodes in the range S4x relate to the Chesterfield area. The range S6x relates to Rotherham. S7x relates to Barnsley, and S8x relates to Worksop. Any other postcodes prefixed S are non-geographic in nature.

The approximate coverage of the postcode districts:

S1-S36: SHEFFIELD, DRONFIELD and HOPE VALLEY Post Towns

Postcode district	Post town	Coverage	Local authority area(s)
S1	SHEFFIELD	City Centre	Sheffield
S2	SHEFFIELD	City Centre, Arbourthorne, Heeley, Highfield, Lowfield, Manor, Newfield Green, Norfolk Park, Park Hill, Wybourn	Sheffield
S3	SHEFFIELD	City Centre, Broomhall, Burngreave, Neepsend, Netherthorpe, Pitsmoor	Sheffield
S4	SHEFFIELD	Brightside, Burngreave, Grimesthorpe, Osgathorpe, Page Hall, Pitsmoor	Sheffield
S5	SHEFFIELD	Ecclesfield, Firth Park, Fir Vale, Longley, Shirecliffe, Shiregreen, Southey, Parson Cross, Wincobank	Sheffield
S6	SHEFFIELD	Bradfield, Dungworth, Fox Hill, Hillsborough, Holdworth, Hollow Meadows, Loxley, Malin Bridge, Middlewood, Stannington, Storrs, Upperthorpe, Wadsley, Wadsley Bridge, Walkley, Wisewood	Sheffield
S7	SHEFFIELD	Beauchief, Carter Knowle, Millhouses, Nether Edge	Sheffield
S8	SHEFFIELD	Batemoor, Beauchief, Greenhill, Jordanthorpe, Lowedges, Meadowhead, Meersbrook, Norton, Norton Lees, Woodseats	Sheffield
S9	SHEFFIELD	Attercliffe, Brightside, Darnall, Handsworth Hill, Meadowhall, Tinsley, Wincobank	Sheffield
S10	SHEFFIELD	Broomhall, Broomhill, Crookes, Crookesmoor, Crosspool, Endcliffe, Fulwood, Lodge Moor, Ranmoor	Sheffield
S11	SHEFFIELD	Bents Green, Carter Knowle, Ecclesall, Greystones, Millhouses, Nether Edge, Parkhead, Ringinglow, Sharrow, Whirlow	Sheffield
S12	SHEFFIELD	Frecheville, Gleadless, Hackenthorpe, Intake, Ridgeway	North East Derbyshire, Sheffield
S13	SHEFFIELD	Handsworth, Normanton Spring, Orgreave, Richmond, Woodhouse, Woodthorpe	Rotherham, Sheffield
S14	SHEFFIELD	Gleadless Valley	Sheffield
S17	SHEFFIELD	Bradway, Dore, Totley	Sheffield
S18	DRONFIELD	Dronfield, Holmesfield, Unstone	North East Derbyshire
S20	SHEFFIELD	Beighton, Crystal Peaks, Halfway, Mosborough, Owlthorpe, Plumbley, Sothall, Waterthorpe, Westfield	Sheffield
S21	SHEFFIELD	Eckington, Killamarsh, Marsh Lane, Middle Handley, Renishaw, Spinkhill, Troway, West Handley	North East Derbyshire
S25	SHEFFIELD	Anston, Brookhouse, Dinnington, Laughton en le Morthen, Slade Hooton	Rotherham
S26	SHEFFIELD	Aston, Aughton, Harthill, Kiveton Park, Swallownest, Todwick, Ulley, Wales, Waleswood, Woodall	Rotherham
S32	HOPE VALLEY	Abney, Bretton, Calver, Curbar, Eyam, Foolow, Grindleford, Hathersage, Leam, Stoney Middleton	Derbyshire Dales
S33	HOPE VALLEY	Aston, Bamford, Barber Booth, Bradwell, Castleton, Edale, Hope, Thornhill, Yorkshire Bridge	High Peak
S35	SHEFFIELD	Chapeltown, Crane Moor, Ecclesfield, Green Moor, Grenoside, Hermit Hill, High Green, Oughtibridge, Thurgoland, Wharncliffe Side, Wortley, Worrall	Sheffield, Barnsley
S36	SHEFFIELD	Bolsterstone, Carlecotes, Catshaw, Crow Edge, Deepcar, Dunford Bridge, Hoylandswaine, Ingbirchworth, Langsett, Midhopestones, Millhouse Green, Oxspring, Snowden Hill, Stocksbridge, Penistone, Thurlstone, Upper Midhope, Wigtwizzle	Barnsley, Sheffield

S40-S49: CHESTERFIELD Post Town

Postcode district	Post town	Coverage	Local authority area(s)
S40	CHESTERFIELD	Town Centre, Boythorpe, Birdholme, Brampton	Chesterfield
S41	CHESTERFIELD	Corbriggs, Hasland, Newbold, Old Whittington, Sheepbridge, Spital, Tapton, Whittington Moor, Winsick	Chesterfield, North East Derbyshire
S42	CHESTERFIELD	Alton, Cutthorpe, Eastmoor, Grassmoor, Holmewood, Holymoorside, Ingmanthorpe, North Wingfield, Temple Normanton, Tupton, Wadshelf, Walton, Wingerworth	Chesterfield, North East Derbyshire
S43	CHESTERFIELD	Barlborough, Barrow Hill, Brimington, Clowne, Hollingwood, Inkersall Green, Poolsbrook, Mastin Moor, Staveley	Bolsover, Chesterfield
S44	CHESTERFIELD	Arkwright Town, Ault Hucknall, Bolsover, Calow, Doe Lea, Heath, Oxcroft, Rowthorne, Scarcliffe, Shuttlewood, Stanfree, Stansby, Sutton cum Duckmanton, Sutton Scarsdale	Bolsover, North East Derbyshire
S45	CHESTERFIELD	Ashover, Astwith, Clay Cross, Hardstoft, Kelstedge, Littlemoor, Milltown, Pilsley, Slack, Uppertown	North East Derbyshire
S49	CHESTERFIELD	Bulk users	non-geographic

S60-S66: ROTHERHAM and MEXBOROUGH Post Towns

Postcode district	Post town	Coverage	Local authority area(s)
S60	ROTHERHAM	Town Centre, Brinsworth, Catcliffe, Canklow, Clifton, Masbrough, Treeton, Waverley, Whiston	Rotherham
S61	ROTHERHAM	Greasbrough, Kimberworth, Rockingham, Scholes, Thorpe Hesley	Rotherham
S62	ROTHERHAM	Abdy, Nether Haugh, Parkgate, Rawmarsh, Wentworth	Rotherham
S63	ROTHERHAM	Bolton-on-Dearne, Goldthorpe, Thurnscoe, Brampton Bierlow, Wath-on-Dearne, West Melton	Barnsley, Rotherham
S64	MEXBOROUGH	Adwick Upon Dearne, Kilnhurst, Mexborough, Swinton	Doncaster, Rotherham
S65	ROTHERHAM	Dalton, East Dene, Eastwood, Herringthorpe, Hooton Roberts, Ravenfield, Thrybergh	
S66	ROTHERHAM	Braithwell, Bramley, Brampton-en-le-Morthen, Hellaby, Maltby, Micklebring, Morthen, Stainton, Stone, Thurcroft, Wickersley	Rotherham, Doncaster

S70-S75: BARNSLEY Post Town

Postcode district	Post town	Coverage	Local authority area(s)
S70	BARNSLEY	Town Centre, Birdwell, Kendray, Stairfoot, Worsborough	Barnsley
S71	BARNSLEY	Ardsley, Athersley, Lundwood, Monk Bretton, Royston	Barnsley
S72	BARNSLEY	Brierley, Cudworth, Grimethorpe, Shafton, South Hiendley	Barnsley, Wakefield
S73	BARNSLEY	Darfield, Hemingfield, Wombwell	Barnsley, Rotherham
S74	BARNSLEY	Elsecar, Hoyland, Jump	Barnsley
S75	BARNSLEY	Barugh Green, Cawthorne, Darton, Dodworth, Gawber, Kexbrough, Mapplewell, Pogmoor, Staincross, Tankersley, Wilthorpe	Barnsley, Wakefield

S80 and S81: WORKSOP Post Town

Postcode district	Post town	Coverage	Local authority area(s)
S80	WORKSOP	Worksop (south), Creswell, Rhodesia, Thorpe Salvin, Whitwell	Bassetlaw, Bolsover, Rotherham
S81	WORKSOP	Worksop (north), Blyth, Carlton-in-Lindrick, Langold, Shireoaks, Woodsetts	Bassetlaw, Rotherham

S94-S99: Non-Geographic Postcodes

Postcode district	Post town	Coverage	Local authority area(s)
S94	SHEFFIELD	Census 2021 (a main national office)	non-geographic
S95	SHEFFIELD	Bulk users	non-geographic
S96	SHEFFIELD	Bulk users	non-geographic
S97	ROTHERHAM, SHEFFIELD	Bulk users, mostly Selectapost	non-geographic
S98	SHEFFIELD	Bulk users	non-geographic
S99	SHEFFIELD	Jobcentre Plus	non-geographic

== Map ==
S postcode area map, showing postcode districts in red and post towns in grey text, with links to nearby DE, DN, HD, NG, SK and WF postcode areas.

== See also ==
- Postcode Address File
- List of postcode areas in the United Kingdom
