= Holmewood =

Village in Derbyshire, England

Coordinates: 53.18934°N 1.3549°W

- Village
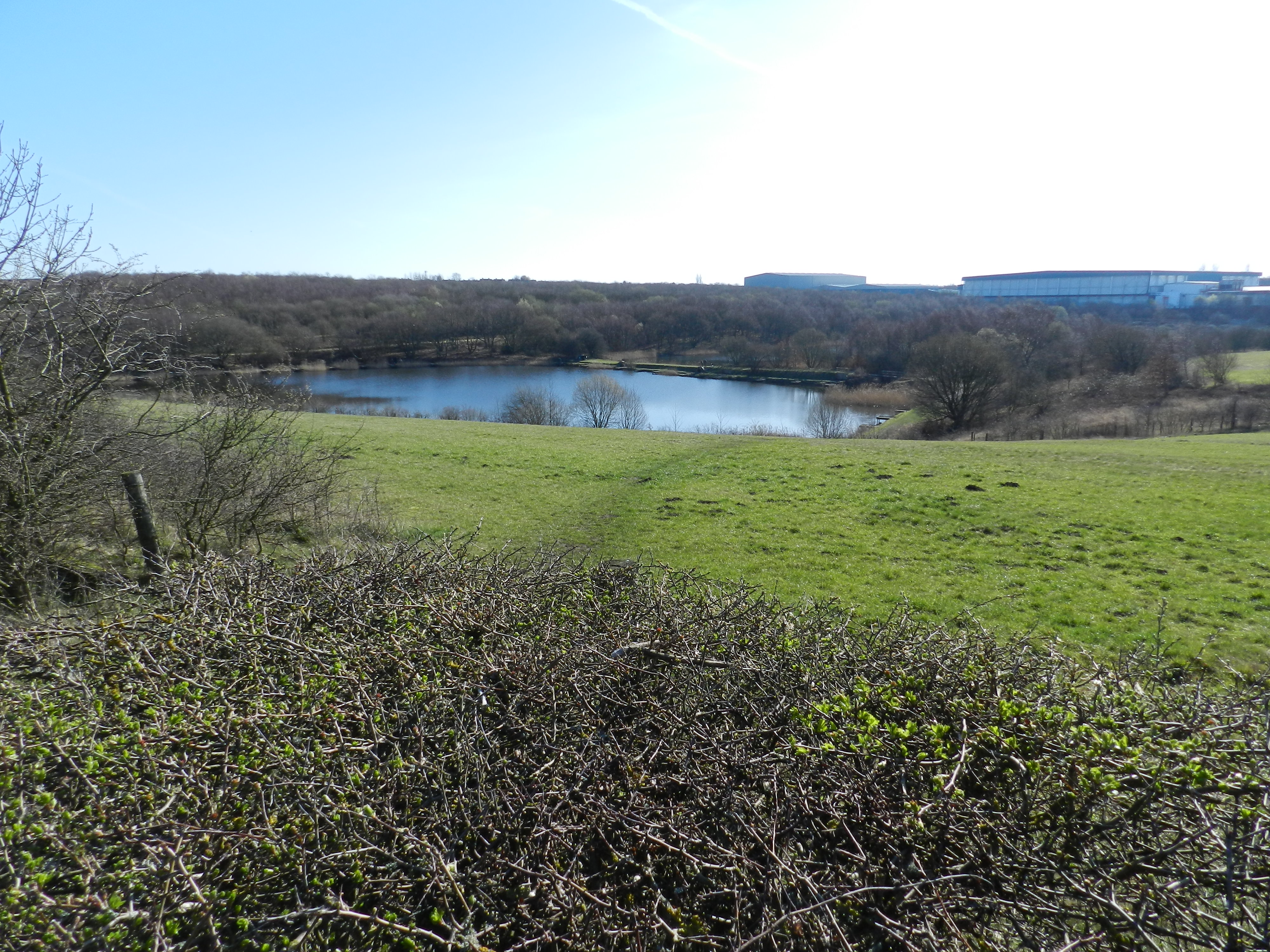
- Williamthorpe Ponds Nature Reserve. Middle pond view, with Holmewood Industrial Park Unit in the background.

- Location within Derbyshire
- Population: 2,909 (2001)
- OS grid reference: SK432660
- Civil parish: Heath and Holmewood
- District: North East Derbyshire
- Shire county: Derbyshire
- Region: East Midlands
- Country: England
- Sovereign state: United Kingdom
- Post town: CHESTERFIELD
- Postcode district: S42
- Dialling code: 01246
- Police: Derbyshire
- Fire: Derbyshire
- Ambulance: East Midlands
- UK Parliament: Bolsover

Holmewood is a village in the North East Derbyshire district of Derbyshire, England. Historically a coal mining village, it has close links to the villages of Heath, North Wingfield and Temple Normanton. It is in the civil parish of Heath and Holmewood.

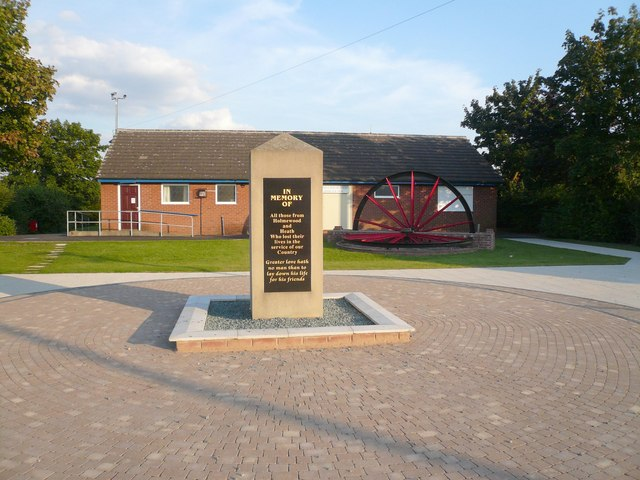
Holmewood War Memorial

The village of Holmewood was formed as a residence by The Williamthorpe Colliery Company from 1905 until 1970, when it closed due to the high cost of deep seam mining. The colliery was the main employer of the village and upon its closure, caused much unemployment within the area. As a consequence of the Margaret Thatcher Government in the late 1980s, plans were put in place to construct two large industrial estates to limit the high unemployment levels within the ex-colliery communities in the North Derbyshire Area. This industrial estate has now expanded to cover a much larger area and is known as the 'Holmewood Enterprise Zone'. Due to EU Government incentives, the site attracts high levels of investment from national-level companies.

There is a countryside park on the site, which is known as the Five Pits Trail, which links the five villages around Holmewood. The area contains several ponds that, once heavily polluted, are now havens for wildlife and are popular with anglers and birdwatchers.

The village has many small shops, a Working men's club, churches and a public library. The local football team is Holmewood Park Rangers.

== See also ==
- Listed buildings in Heath and Holmewood
