= Dennis Wright =

English footballer

Personal information
- Full name: Dennis Wright
- Date of birth: 19 December 1919
- Place of birth: Boythorpe, Derbyshire, England
- Date of death: August 1993 (aged 73)
- Place of death: Bolsover, England
- Position: Goalkeeper

Senior career*
Years	Team	Apps	(Gls)
1946–1957	Mansfield Town	379	(0)
- * Club domestic league appearances and goals

Dennis Wright (19 December 1919 – August 1993) was an English football goalkeeper who played for Mansfield Town.

A native of Boythorpe, near Chesterfield, Wright joined Mansfield in March 1939, shortly before the outbreak of World War II. However, due to the war, he had to wait until 1946 to make his competitive debut for the club. During the war years, Wright served in the British Army, and was stationed in Northern Ireland most of that time. He guested for Glenavon during the war, and also played for Nottingham Forest in wartime competitions.

After the war, he returned to Mansfield, and made his debut on 12 October 1946 against Leyton Orient. He remained Mansfield's first-choice goalkeeper for the next decade, and played a total of 399 first-team matches for the club, which was a club record at the time of his retirement from the game in 1957. He died in 1993, aged 73.
