= Gilberthorpe =

Gilberthorpe is a surname. Notable people with the surname include:

- Jeff Gilberthorpe (1939–2021), British/Australian artist
- Ted Gilberthorpe (1885–1960), British footballer
