= North East Derbyshire Music Centre =

Music organization in Derbyshire

The North East Derbyshire Music Centre, or NEDMC was a music organisation located in Derbyshire. It provided ensemble-based music opportunities for both beginners and experienced musicians. Groups met at Outwood Academy Newbold, Newbold on Friday nights and Saturday mornings during school term time. A wholly new entity Chesterfield and North East Derbyshire Music Centre (a registered Charitable Incorporated Organisation) set up in its place to provide ensemble music-making opportunities for young people across the region.
