= Newbold, Derbyshire =

Village in Derbyshire, England

Coordinates: 53.2519°N 1.4461°W

Newbold
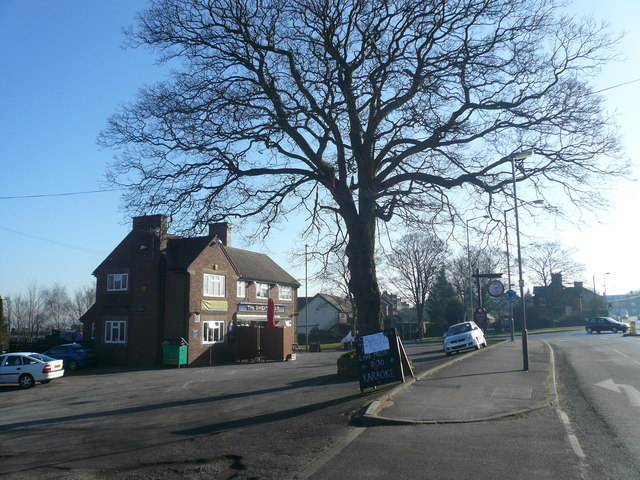
- The Wheatsheaf Public House, Newbold.

- Location within Derbyshire
- Population: 7,962
- OS grid reference: SK369729
- Civil parish: Newbold
- District: Chesterfield
- Shire county: Derbyshire
- Region: East Midlands
- Country: England
- Sovereign state: United Kingdom
- Post town: Chesterfield
- Postcode district: S41
- Dialling code: 01246
- Police: Derbyshire
- Fire: Derbyshire
- Ambulance: East Midlands
- UK Parliament: Chesterfield

Newbold is a village north of Chesterfield, Derbyshire, England, which in 2001 had a population of just under 8,000.

It is mainly residential in nature. There are two secondary schools, St Mary's Catholic High School on Newbold Road, which is usually rated in the top ten to twenty state schools in the country each year by The Times schools league tables, and Outwood Academy Newbold on Highfield Lane. The school reopened in 2006 after being rebuilt with the aid of government funding. The school was previously split across 2 locations known as Upper Site and Lower Site, and both buildings were ageing and badly in need of replacement. The Lower Site was demolished and turned into a housing estate.

Saint John's Church of England parish church was built in 1857, and its churchyard contains the grave of John Lauder (died 1882), the father of Sir Harry Lauder. Next door to the church is 'The Eagle Club'. Also on St John's Road there are two veterinary practices and a police house.

A path to the left of the Nag's Head pub leads past a late-Saxon chapel, which belonged to the local Roman Catholic Eyre family, and contains 12 coffins in a crypt. Eyre's chapel stands geographically on the highest point of Newbold Village. It was used as the local Roman Catholic church for many years until the present church, on the corner of Littlemoor and Dukes Drive, was built in the mid-1960s. Due to persistent vandalism, the chapel windows were bricked up in the 1970s and access restricted. More recently, some restoration of the chapel has taken place.

Nearby is the Barnett Observatory on Hastings Close, which is a member of the Federation of Astronomical Societies.

The name of Hastings Close is linked to the Battle of Hastings, and the name of Dukes Drive is linked to the large local landholdings which used to be held by the Duke of Devonshire, and this road was built on land sold by the duke for residential housing in the 1930s.

In the early 1960s the road leading off Littlemoor, by the side of the Goldminers public house, was named Windermere Road. It used to be called Bargh's Lane and had a row of old stone cottages. Bargh's Lane led to open farmland until the building of the council estates. There is now a private dentist's practice on the corner of Windermere and Littlemoor, which is situated next-door to a pharmacy (Dent's Chemists), the doctor's (Newbold Surgery) and Newbold Library.

There is a collection of shops, pubs to the north and a new indoor and outdoor Tennis Academy to the south near Chesterfield FC's original football ground at Saltergate. Towards the end of Newbold Road there is Holme Brook Reservoir and Country Park, designated a site of Importance for Nature and Conservation. It is host to a variety of plants, insects and animals with a large woodland plantation. It is also home to the increasingly rare Skylark. It has popular walking and cycling routes, some of which lead to Linacre Reservoirs.

== Early history ==
Newbold is mentioned in the Domesday Book of 1066, where it is spelt Newebold. Newbold had 6 berewicks within it, and was given greater importance than Chesterfield. Today the opposite is true: Chesterfield has become much larger and has enveloped Newbold. It says, under the heading of 'The lands of the king, William the Conqueror':

In Newbold with six berewicks – Old Whittington, Brimington, Tapton, Chesterfield, Boythorpe, Eckington – there are six carucates and one bovate to the geld. There is land for six ploughs. There the king has 16 villans and one slave having four ploughs. To this manor belong eight acres of meadow. There is woodland pasture three leagues long and three leagues broad. TRE worth £6 now £10"

== The 19th century ==
The population of Newbold increased dramatically during the late 19th century because of the Industrial Revolution. There was an increase of coal mining in the area and the production of earthenware, bricks and tiles was in abundance.

In 1870–72, John Marius Wilson's described Newbold in the Imperial Gazetteer of England and Wales like this:

"NEWBOLD, a village, a township, and a chapelry, in Chesterfield district, Derby. The village stands 1¾ mile N W of Chesterfield r. station, and has a post-office under Chesterfield. The township includes Dunston, bears the name of Newbold and Dunston, and is in Chesterfield parish. Real property, £18,128; of which £10 are in quarries, £895 in mines, £150 in iron-works, and £1,600 in gas-works. Pop. in 1851, 2,035; in 1861, 3,283. Houses, 690. The increase of pop. arose from the extension of coal mining and of iron-works. Newbold House is the residence of the Rev. A.Bromehead; Newbold Fields, of Capt. E. W. Fox; Highfield, of Mrs. M. Lucas; Dunston Hall, of J.Plevins, Esq.; and Thornfield House, of J. Shipton, Esq. Stone bottles and coarseearthenware are manufactured in several establishments; and bricks and tiles are made. Races are held in August. The chapelry excludes part of the township, includes part of Whittington parish, and was constituted in 1861. Pop., 2,362. Houses, 481. Pop. of the Newbold and Dunston portion, 2,134; of the Whittington portion, 228. The living is a p. rectory in the diocese of Lichfield. Value, £300.* Patron, the Vicar of Chesterfield. The church was built in 1857, is in the early English style, and has a tower and spire. There are a Wesleyan chapel, national schools, and three alms-houses."

== War memorial ==
The village has a war memorial, opposite The Nag's Head public house, where Littlemoor meets Newbold Road. The memorial lists the names of those from the village who died in the First World War.

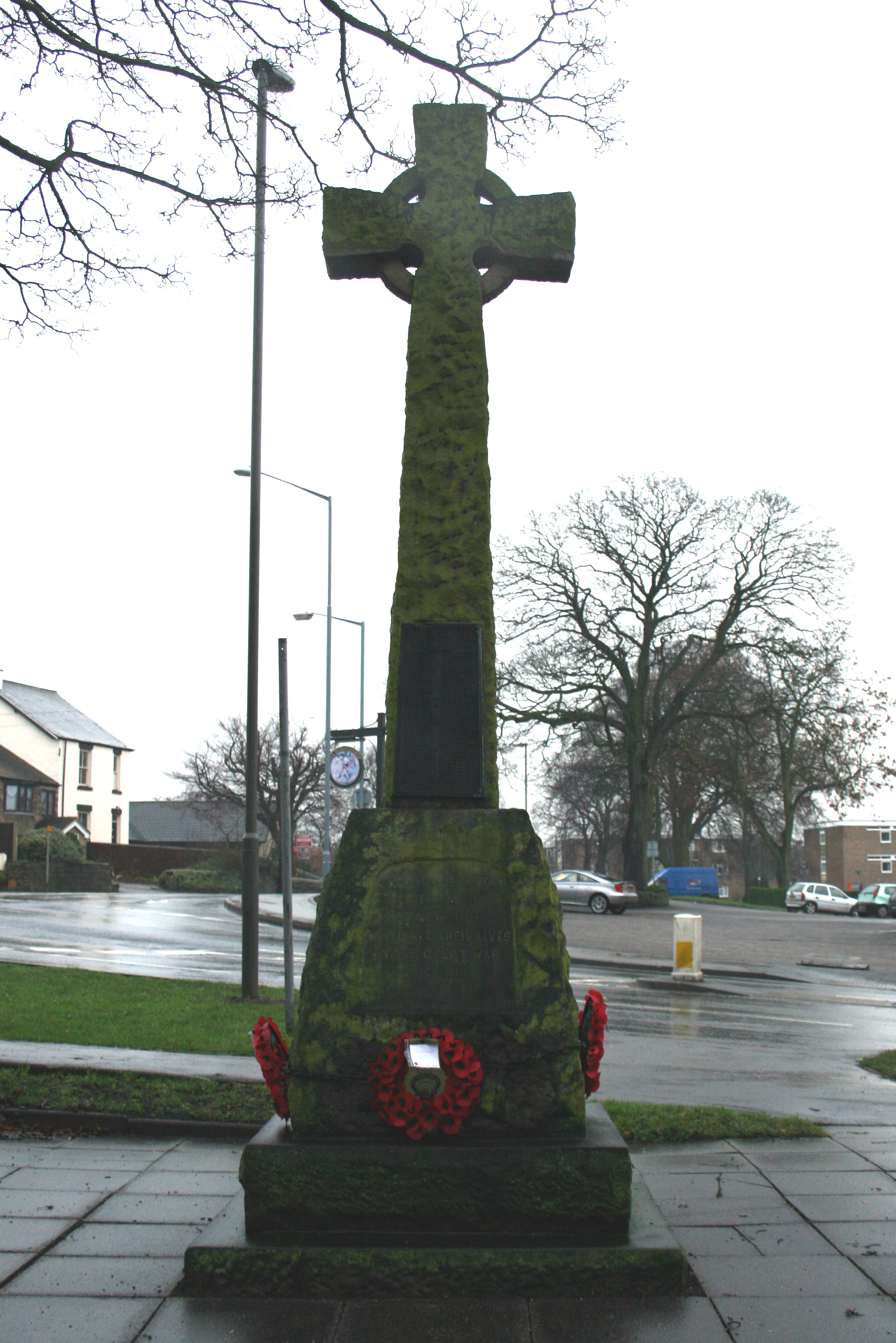
Front

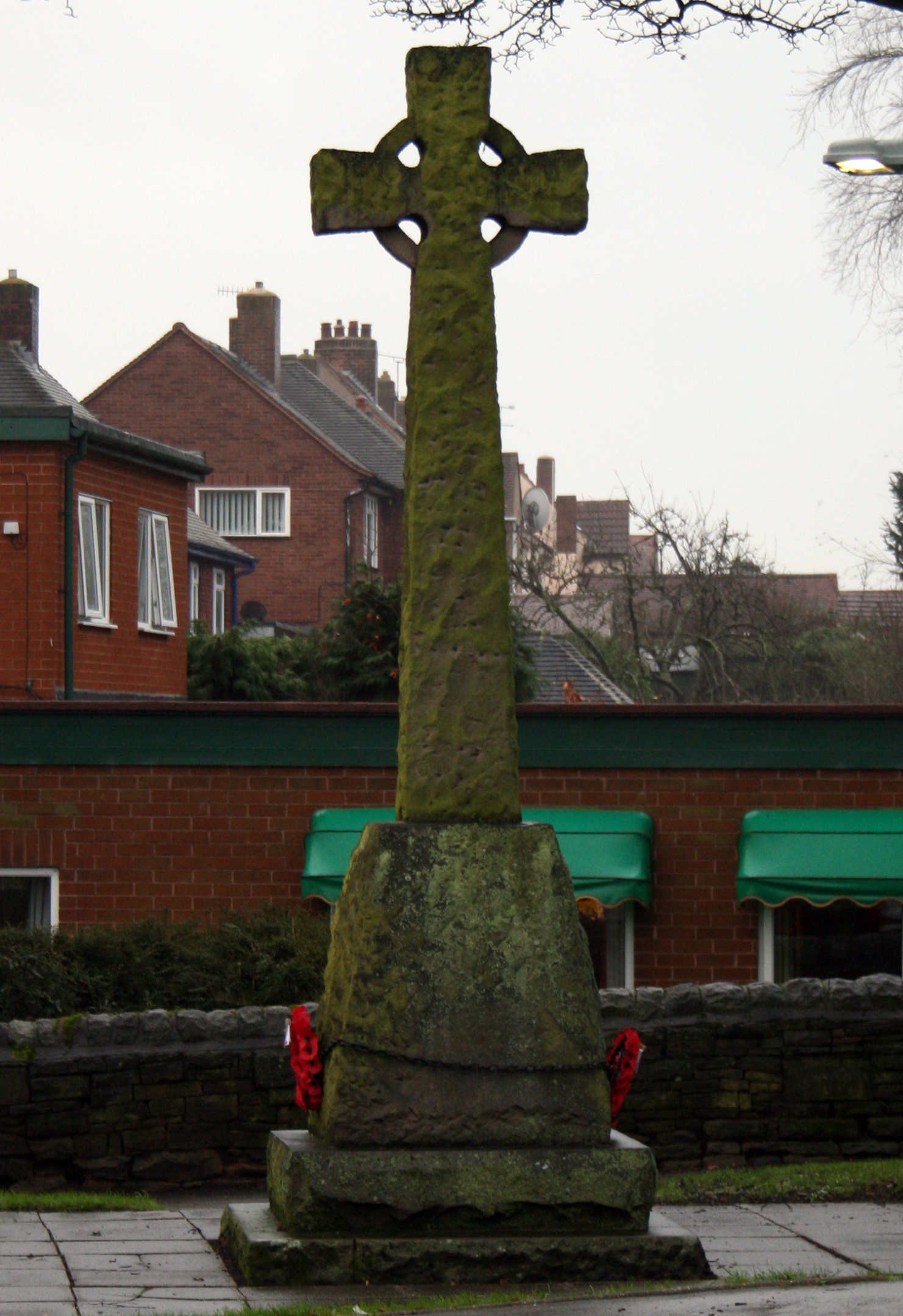
Rear
