= Parkside Community School =

Location
- Boythorpe Avenue; Boythorpe; Chesterfield, Derbyshire, S40 2NS; England
- Coordinates: 53.2309°N 1.4381°W

Information
- Type: Academy
- Local authority: Derbyshire
- Trust: Embark Federation
- Department for Education URN: 149370 Tables
- Ofsted: Reports
- Headteacher: Andy Kelly
- Gender: Co-educational
- Age: 11 to 16
- Enrolment: 570 as of March 2023
- Website: www.parkside.derbyshire.sch.uk

Parkside Community School (formerly William Rhodes Secondary School) is a co-educational secondary school located in the Boythorpe area of Chesterfield in the English county of Derbyshire.

As William Rhodes Secondary School, the Brass Band won the National Festival of Music for Youth on four occasions in the late 1970s. Squadron Leader Norman Crookes was the headmaster for 20 years from 1961. The school was renamed as Parkside in 1991 following a re-organisation of secondary schools in Chesterfield by the county council. The adjacent primary and junior schools retain their original name.

Previously a community school administered by Derbyshire County Council, in April 2023 Parkside Community School converted to academy status. The school is now sponsored by the Embark Federation.

Parkside Community School offers GCSEs, BTECs, Cambridge Nationals and ASDAN qualifications as programmes of study for pupils. The school has developed a specialism in Mathematics and Computing.
