= Knifesmithgate =

Street in Chesterfield, Derbyshire, England

Coordinates: 53.2364°N 1.4280°W

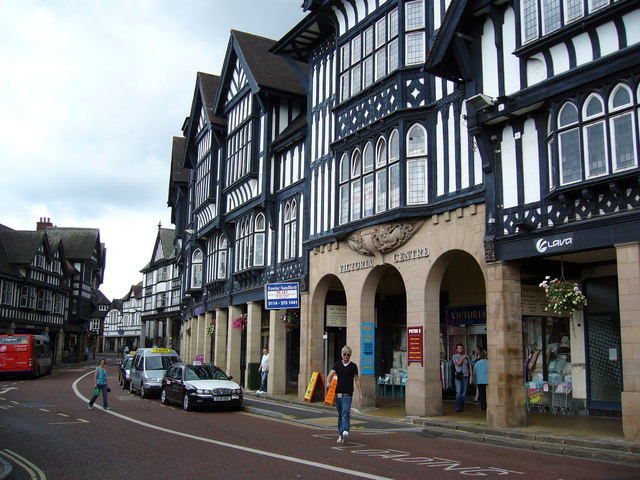
Knifesmithgate

Knifesmithgate is a short street located in Chesterfield, Derbyshire, England. It connects Church Way at the Church of St Mary and All Saints in the east, and Rose Hill in the west.

== History ==
Similar to other parts of Derbyshire, the name reflects the history of smithing along the brooks and streams in the area, as well as a local family linked to the trade. Today the street contains mock Tudor buildings, largely dating back to the 1920s.
