= Birdholme =

Suburb of Chesterfield, Derbyshire, England

Coordinates: 53.22°N 1.427°W

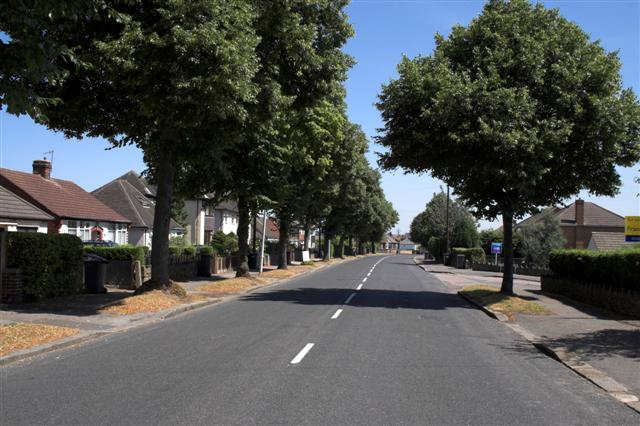
- Langer Lane, Birdholme.

- Location within Derbyshire
- OS grid reference: SK383693
- District: Chesterfield
- Shire county: Derbyshire
- Region: East Midlands
- Country: England
- Sovereign state: United Kingdom
- Post town: CHESTERFIELD
- Postcode district: S40
- Police: Derbyshire
- Fire: Derbyshire
- Ambulance: East Midlands

Birdholme is a suburb of the town of Chesterfield, Derbyshire, England. To its south is Wingerworth, to its north is the town centre, to its west is Boythorpe, and to its east Hasland. The large St. Augustines council estate makes up much of its area, though there are a few more affluent areas such as Langer Lane (pictured). The Bryan Donkin factory and Chesterfield Tube works (formally Tube Investments, later the TI Group) used to dominate the landscape of the area, both have now closed being replaced by new housing, Alma Leisure Park, B&Q and Toys R Us.

The main Derby Road runs out of Chesterfield through Birdholme towards Clay Cross and eventually the city of Derby, which is about 25 miles away.

== Schools ==
Birdholme has two schools, Birdholme Infant School and Spire Junior School (formerly known as Rother Junior School). Both schools are located on the main Derby Road.

== Shopping ==
Birdholme has a small shopping area clustered on Derby Road towards the bottom end of Bacons Lane. There are fewer shops now than there were in the 1990s. The former Angel Inn was converted to a Tesco store.

== Entertainment ==
Birdholme has two public houses and a social club. Birdholme Working Mens Club is located on Rothervale Road, The Walton pub on St. Augustine's Road (now levelled and a vacant plot) and The Hobby Horse on the Alma Leisure Park on Derby Road. The Furnace Inn on Derby Road was closed down in the early 2000s and re-opened successfully as a Chinese restaurant called Chef due Canton. Chesterfield's only bowling alley is situated on Storforth Lane which is the main road heading out to Hasland.
