= Annunciation Church, Chesterfield =

Church in Derbyshire, England

Coordinates: 53.2395°N 1.4321°W

Annunciation Church
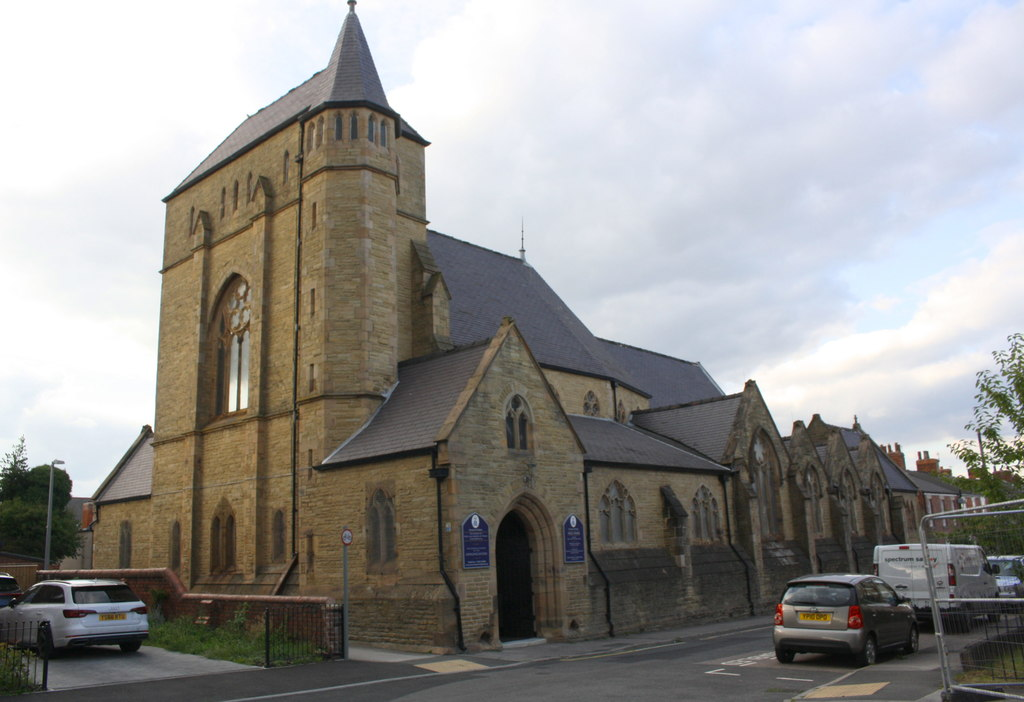
- Front entrance

- Location in Derbyshire
- OS grid reference: SK 37998 71548
- Location: Chesterfield
- Country: England
- Denomination: Roman Catholic
- Website: https://parishofourladyqueenofpeace.org

History
- Status: Active
- Founded: 1854
- Founder: Society of Jesus
- Dedication: Annunciation

Architecture
- Functional status: Parish church
- Heritage designation: Grade II listed
- Designated: 26 September 1977
- Architect: Joseph Hansom

Administration
- Province: Liverpool
- Diocese: Hallam
- Deanery: Chesterfield

Annunciation Church is a Roman Catholic Parish church in Chesterfield, Derbyshire. It was founded by the Society of Jesus in 1854. Located in Spencer Street, near Saltergate and off-Newbold Road, it was designed by the architect Joseph Hansom and is a Grade II listed building.

== History ==
In 1840, the Jesuits founded Mount St Mary's College in Spinkhill. From there they missioned to the local Catholics in the area. In the 1850s they decided to build a church in Chesterfield. Joseph Hansom was asked to design the church. He designed numerous churches for the Jesuits, such as Our Lady Immaculate and St Joseph Church, Prescot, the St Walburge's Church, Preston, St Joseph's Church, Leigh, the Holy Name Church, Manchester and St Aloysius Gonzaga Church, Oxford.

The Jesuit influence is visible in the church in the window immediately before the entrance to the Sacristy. It shows a priest saying Mass before a group of Jesuits. Among those depicted are St Ignatius Loyola and St Francis Xavier.

In 1881, the current organ was installed, it was built by Henry Willis Senior of Henry Willis & Sons. The organ is N05311 on the NPOR National Pipe Organ Register (NPOR) entry for the Willis organ

At some point in the early to mid-20th century the administration of the parish was handed over by the Jesuits to the Diocese of Nottingham. In 1980, Chesterfield and other parts of north Derbyshire became part of the then newly created Diocese of Hallam who continue to serve the parish.

In 1990-1991, the church was reordered and the high altar was removed, part of it remains as the pedestal for a statue of the Blessed Virgin Mary.

In 2017 the church was refurbished (including a refurbishment of the Henry Willis pipe organ by Chris Hind of Aistrup and Hind Organ Builders in Lincoln), and at this point the Parish of Our Lady Queen of Peace was inaugurated with the Church of the Holy Family, Dronfield.

== Parish ==
The church usually has three or four Sunday Masses. They are at 8:30am, 10:00am and 5:00pm (as of September 2026) and then either an afternoon Mass in Polish or a Syro-Malabar Mass. There is Mass celebrated most weekdays at the church, and there is sometimes weekday Mass at the nearby convent of the Daughters of Divine Charity who run St Joseph's School. A list of mass times and confession times each week is published in the church bulletin, available via the link below.

Within the parish are two schools that have a relationship with the church. St Mary's Catholic Primary School is on Cross Street in the buildings where St Mary's Roman Catholic High School, Chesterfield used to be, before it moved to Newbold Street.

== See also ==
- Society of Jesus
- St Mary's Roman Catholic High School, Chesterfield
