= Nigel Illingworth =

English cricketer

Personal information
- Full name: Nigel John Bartle Illingworth
- Born: 23 November 1960 (age 65); Chesterfield, Derbyshire, England
- Batting: Right-handed
- Bowling: Right-arm medium

Domestic team information
- Years: Team
- 1987–1993: Lincolnshire
- 1981–1983: Nottinghamshire

Career statistics
Competition	First-class	List A
Matches	15	21
Runs scored	207	17
Batting average	13.80	5.66
100s/50s	–/–	–/–
Top score	49	8*
Balls bowled	1,249	941
Wickets	16	23
Bowling average	43.37	34.65
5 wickets in innings	1	–
10 wickets in match	–	–
Best bowling	5/89	4/15
Catches/stumpings	8/–	3/–
- Source: Cricinfo, 13 November 2011

Nigel John Bartle Illingworth (born 23 November 1960) is a former English cricketer. Illingworth was a right-handed batsman who bowled right-arm medium pace. He was born at Chesterfield, Derbyshire.

Illingworth made his first-class debut for Nottinghamshire against Cambridge University in 1981. He made fourteen further first-class appearances for the county, the last of which came against Surrey in the 1983 County Championship. In his fifteen first-class matches, he scored a total of 207 runs at an average of 13.80, with a high score of 49. With the ball, he took 16 wickets at a bowling average of 43.37, with best figures of 5/89, which came against Middlesex in 1982. His List A debut for the county came against Leicestershire in the 1981 John Player League. He made twenty further List A appearances, the last of which came against Sussex in the 1983 John Player Special League. In his twenty-one List A appearances, Illingworth took 23 wickets at an average of 34.65, with best figures of 4/15. He left Nottinghamshire at the end of the 1983 season.

He later joined Lincolnshire, making his debut for the county in the 1987 Minor Counties Championship against Cumberland. He played Minor counties cricket for Lincolnshire from 1987 to 1993, making fifteen Minor Counties Championship and eleven MCCA Knockout Trophy appearances.
