= St Mary's Catholic High School, Chesterfield =

St Mary's Catholic High School
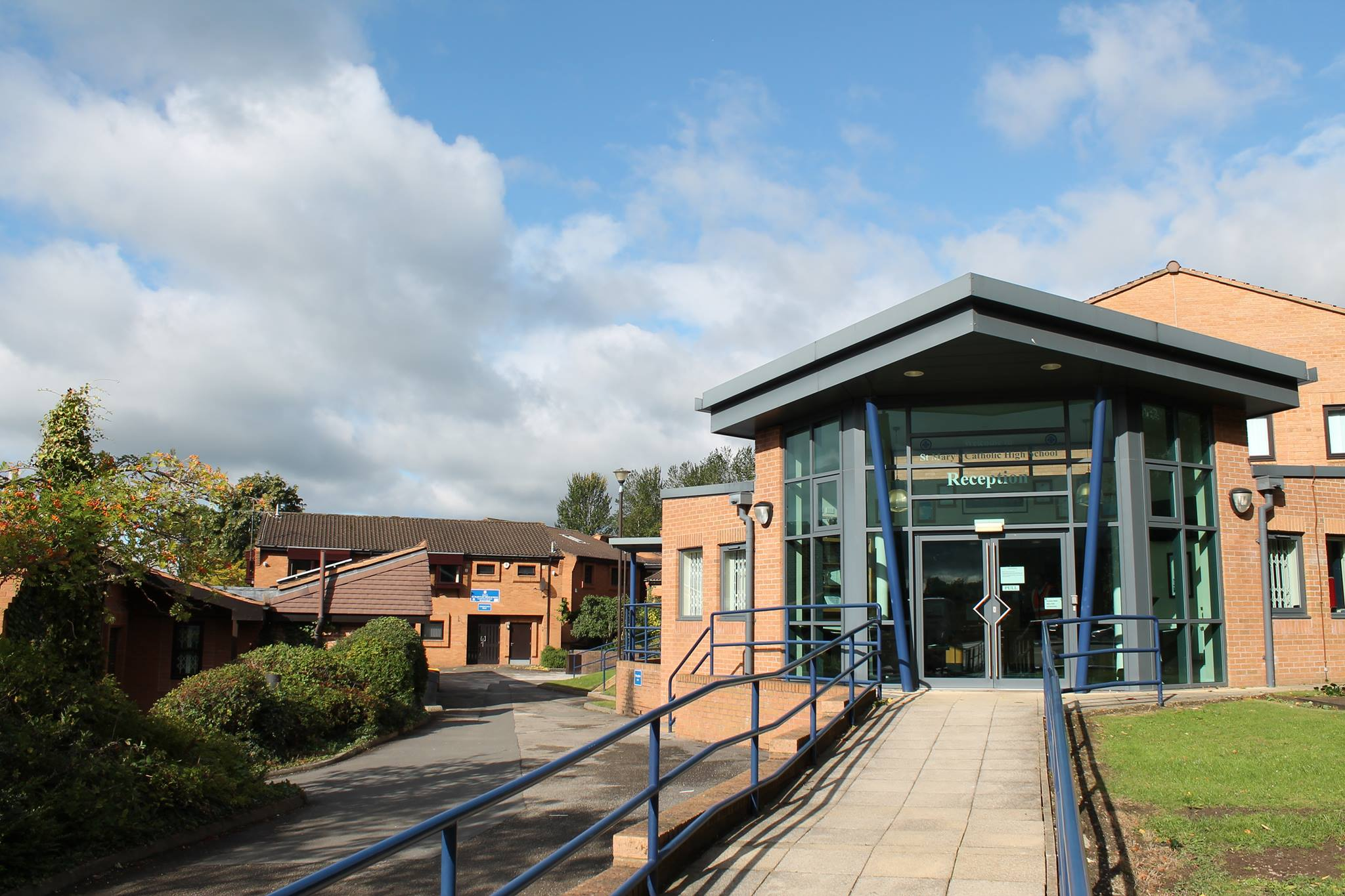

Location
- Gatefield Close; Chesterfield, Derbyshire, S41 8AG; England; 53°15′12″N 1°27′11″W

Information
- Type: Academy
- Motto: Gaudium et Spes
- Religious affiliation: Roman Catholic
- Established: 1865
- Specialist: Language College
- Department for Education URN: 138470 Tables
- Ofsted: Reports
- Headteacher: Maria Dengate
- Gender: Coeducational
- Age: 11 to 18
- Enrolment: Approx. 1,400 pupils
- Houses: Pneuma, Ichthus, Pax, ChiRho, Alpha, Omega
- Colour: Navy Blue
- Broke Ground: 30 May 1978
- Website: www.st-maryshigh.derbyshire.sch.uk

St Mary's Catholic High School is a Catholic, co-educational, secondary school with academy status in Upper Newbold, Chesterfield, Derbyshire, which specialises in the teaching of Maths and History.

The school was rated Outstanding in all areas by Ofsted in October 2012.

== History ==
=== Beginnings ===
The school opened on 8 January 1856. It was part of the Church of the Annunciation, a Roman Catholic church in Chesterfield built by the Society of Jesus (Jesuits) and completed in 1854. The church at the time was also known as St Mary's. The school later moved to a site on Cross Street, also in Chesterfield, around 100 meters from the church. The buildings on Cross Street are now home to St Mary's Roman Catholic Primary School, a feeder school to St Mary's Roman Catholic High School. Both schools are linked with the Church of the Annunciation.

=== Present campus ===
The first brick was laid on 30 May 1978. Phase 1, consisting of the Gym, Drama Hall and Music room (the current IT2) Block and the Admin, Design Technology and Canteen Blocks were handed over by the developer on 27 November 1980. Work was underway on Phase 2 (Art, Chemistry, and Humanities) and this was completed by the summer of 1981. The school grounds opened to pupils in September 1981, although construction of the Biology and Language Blocks (Phase 3) was still underway. Phase 4, the Sixth Form block, was completed in 1984 along with its architectural highlight 'the Bridge'. Phase 5 was never constructed. The large playing fields were finally handed over by the developer in the mid-1980s, much later than planned, due to issues with landscaping and coal mining shafts being discovered. A primary school was marked on plans for the East 'mound' area of the field, but this was cancelled in the late 1980s.

The present campus was officially opened in 1982, one year after its completion. In 1996, a new Music Block and Maths/Physics Block were built, and in 2000 a new building was built to house the school's I.C.T. facilities and sixth form study.

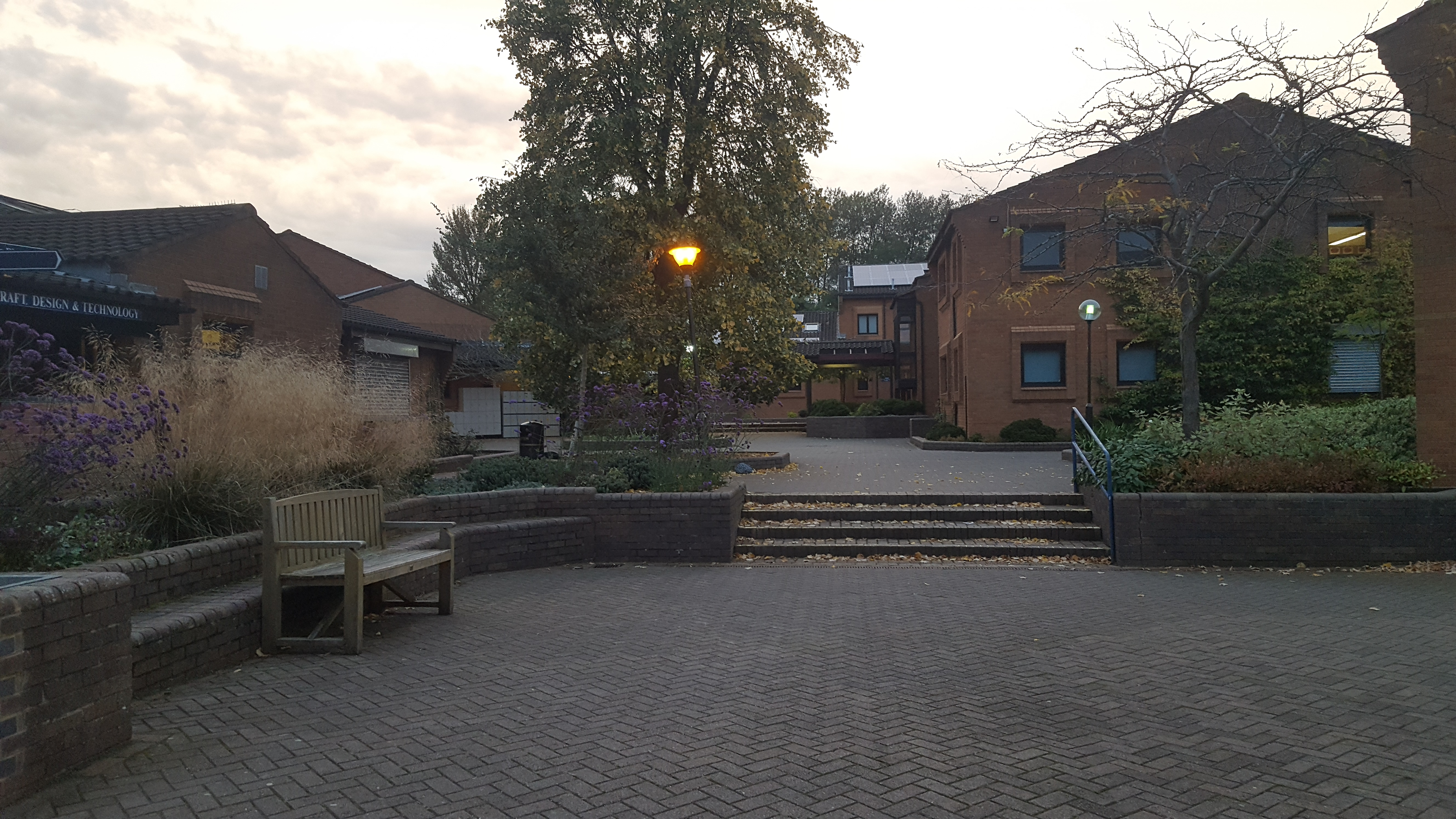
Looking west from the Lower Precinct in the evening.

In the middle of 2002, work in building an all-weather astro-turf sports pitch was completed. The pitch has facilities for football and hockey, and is floodlit for use during the evening, particularly for after-school sports fixtures and the Chesterfield Hockey Club.

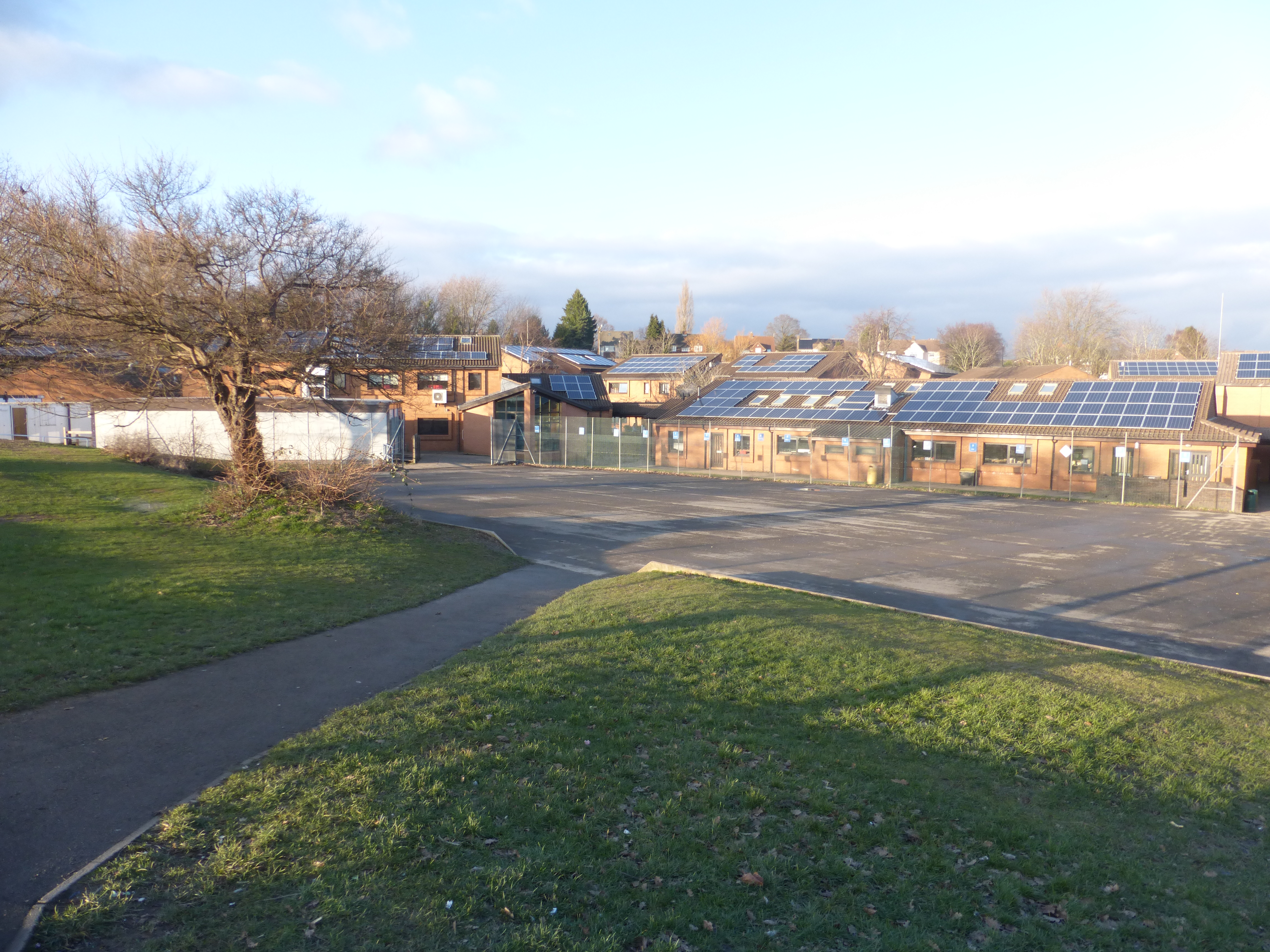
Looking North across the "Cage" from the Astro all weather sports pitch.

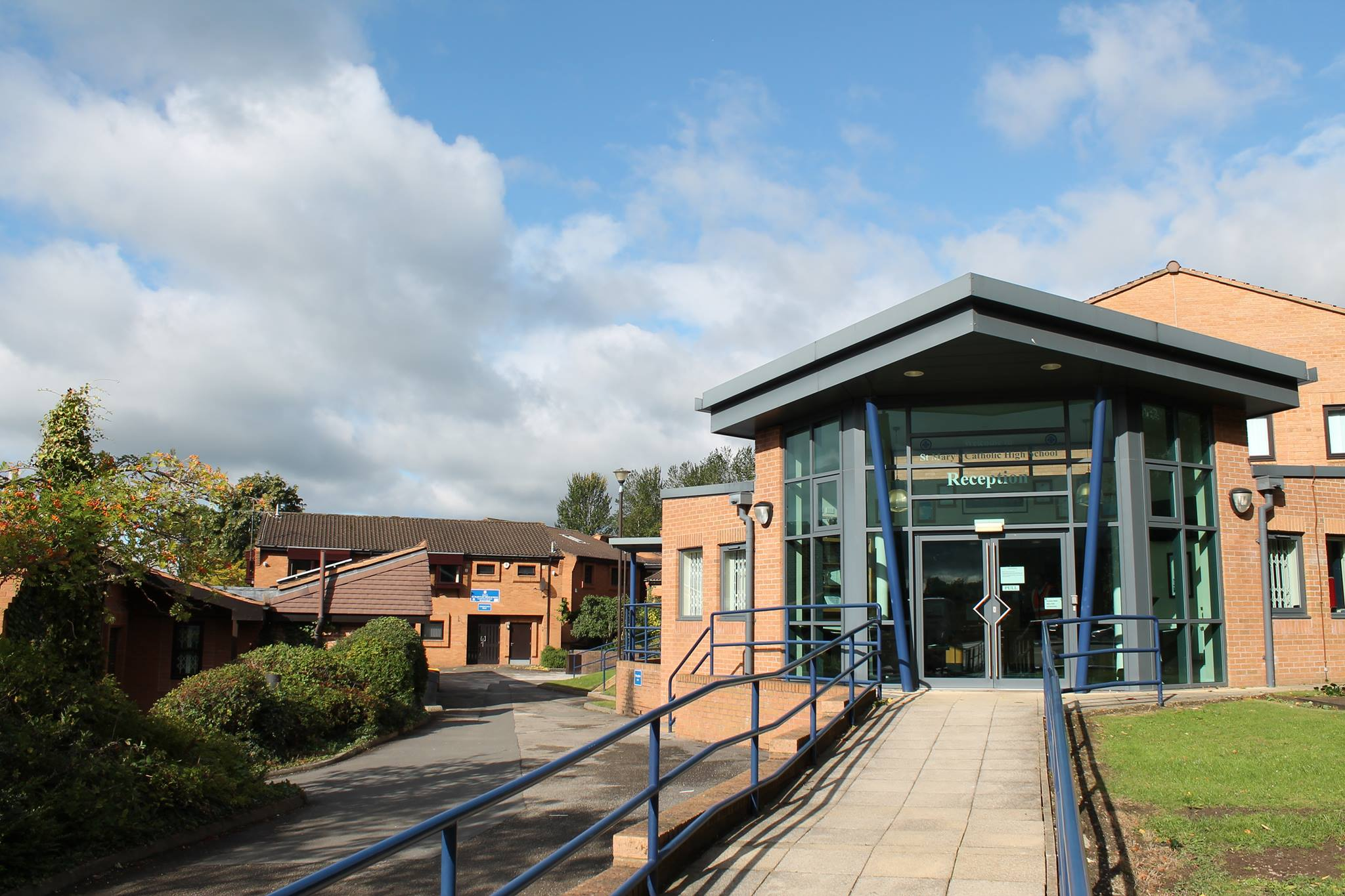
View of Reception before the perimeter fencing was installed.

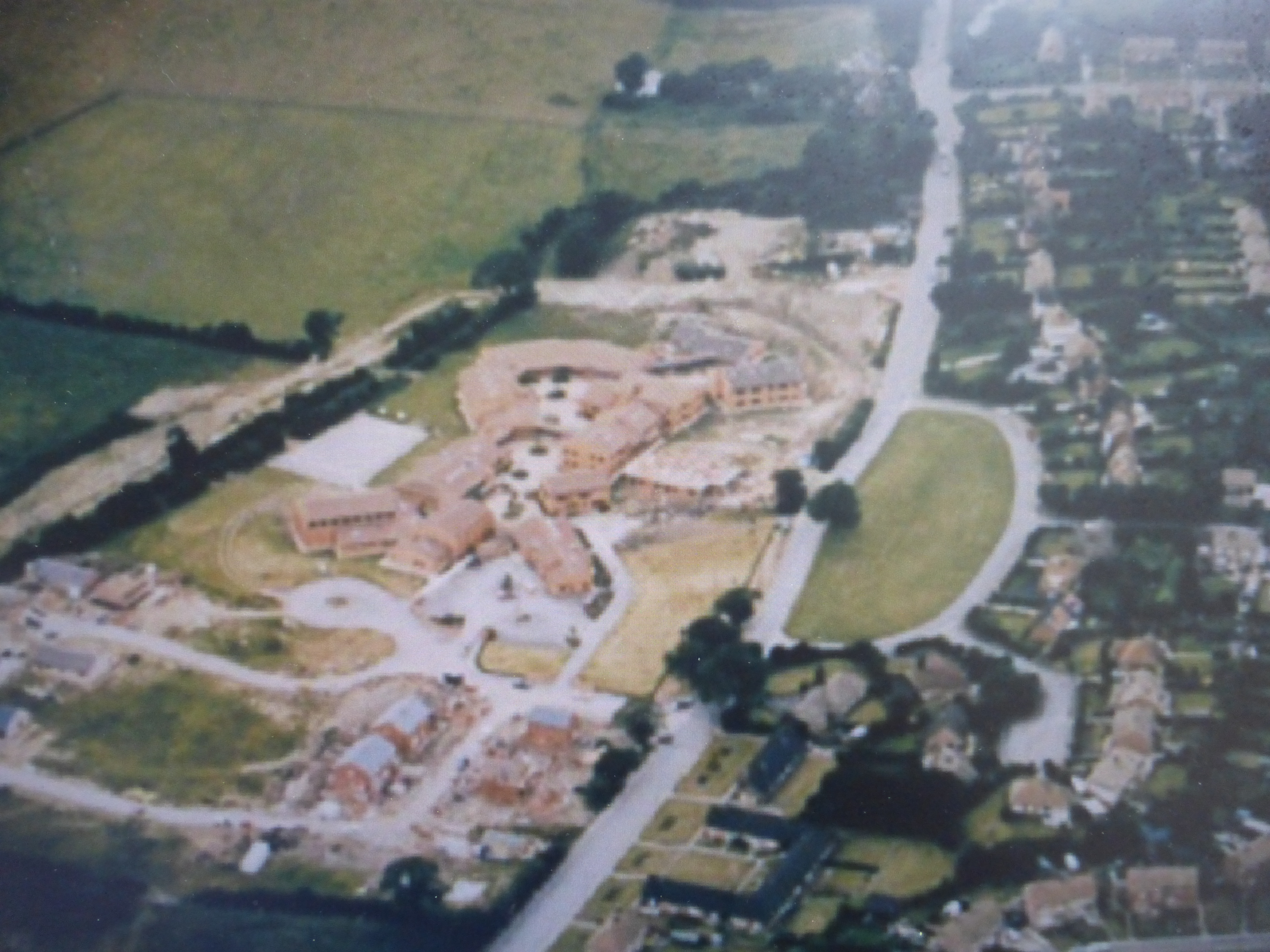
Aerial view of school site from c1983. Water Lane can be seen on the left, running almost parallel to Newbold Road. The Sixth Form block is under construction in the centre of the photo. Also note the original bus turning circle.

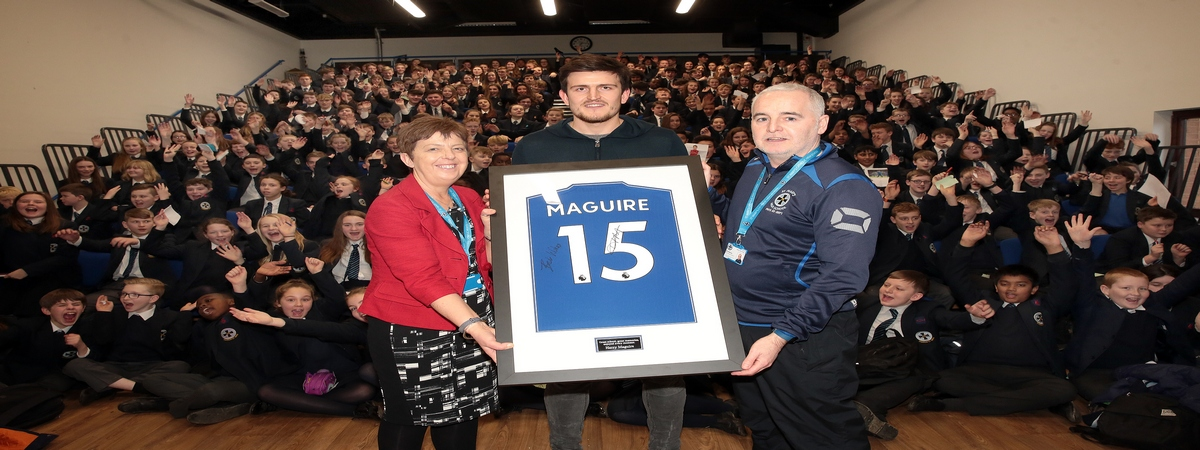
Footballer Harry Maguire presents a signed shirt to Mrs. Cain and Mr. McKee on 10 January 2018.

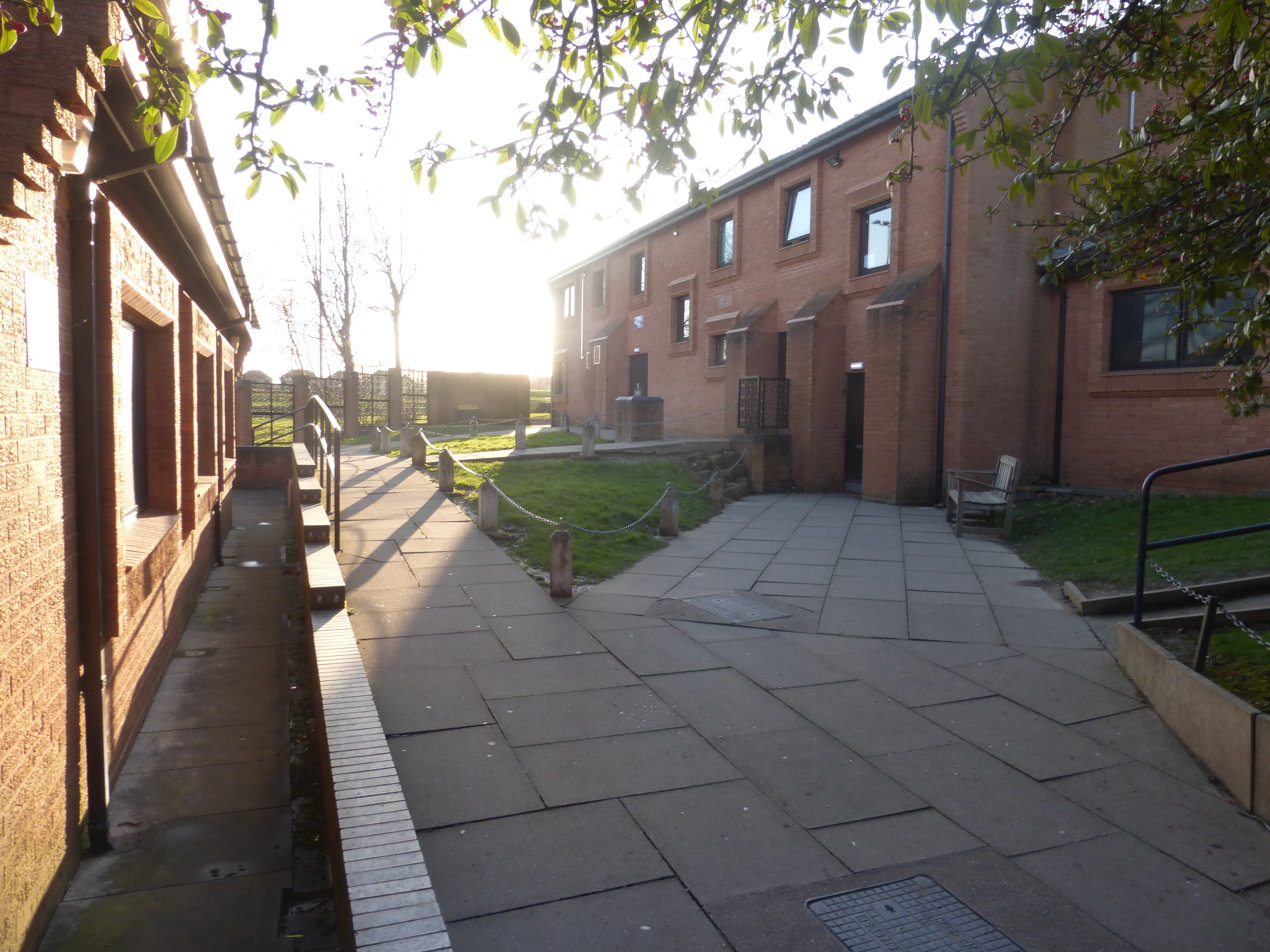
View South to Maths and Physics block.

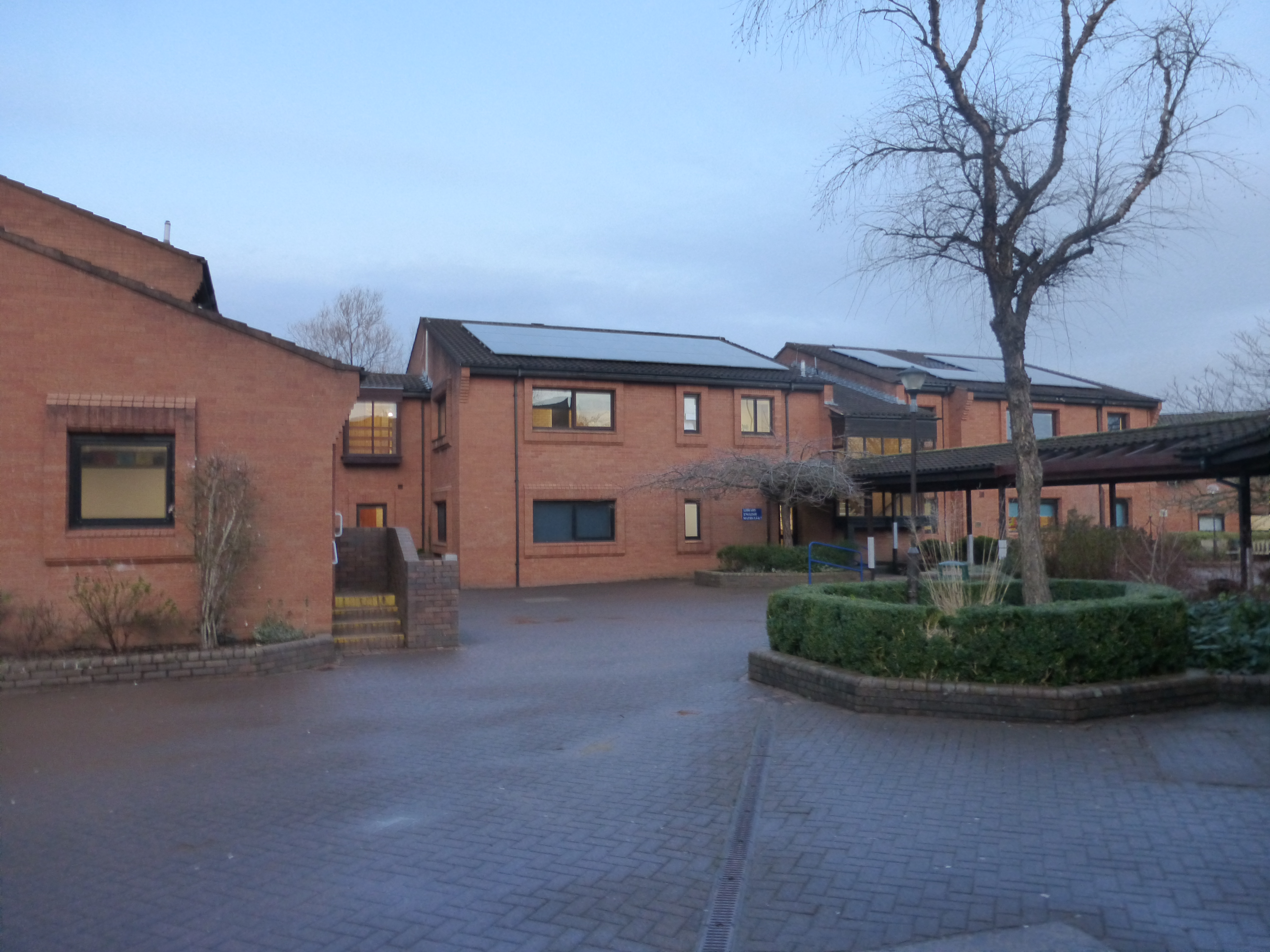
Looking North East towards the Humanities Block.

In September 2003, work on a £1.6 million Sports Hall was started, the building was completed in June 2004. The building was dedicated, and blessed in the same month.

In 2004, work started on a new building to house the school's English Department; this was completed in the middle of 2005 and features five classrooms, three offices, and toilet facilities.

On the morning of 15 March 2011, a bus carrying pupils to school collided with a bridge near Barrow Hill. The single decker bus, which usually operated the route, was not operating that morning and so a replacement bus - a double decker prohibited from the route due to low bridges - was run instead. One student was seriously injured, with seventeen others sustaining minor injuries.

=== Sesquicentennial ===
The school celebrated its sesquicentennial (150th anniversary) on 30 January 2015. A competition took place during art lessons to design a new logo for the school. A time capsule was buried in the “Alleyway” between the Admin and Sixth Form blocks, to be opened in 2065. There is a plaque located above the site of it. Planting of trees also took place to replace the one destroyed by the extension of the Drama Hall.

A history book of the school, written by former pupil Leonie Martin, was published in 2015 to mark the anniversary.

== Governance ==
The head is Maria Dengate, who succeeded Sean McClafferty in 2017. Former deputy head teacher Susan Cain was awarded the Benemerenti medal by the Pope upon her retirement in December 2020, following 35 years of service to education at the school.

The school has a leadership team comprising deputy head teacher Alexander Breedon and several assistant head teachers.

== School houses ==
St Mary's has six school houses which compete in the school's various inter-house events (primarily sport). The house names reflect the school's Catholic ethos:

- Alpha - The house symbol is the Greek letter alpha
- Omega - The house symbol is the Greek letter omega
- Pax - Sign of peace holy spirit and the house symbol is a dove.
- Chi Rho - The symbol is the first two letters of the Greek word for Christ (chi = x and rho = p) superimposed.
- Ichthus - The house symbol is a fish which was used by early Christians
- Pneuma - The house symbol is a flame, signifying the everlasting flame of Christ and breath of God.

The house symbols appear on the pupils' badges. The colour of the picture shows which year group they belong to and the colour is retained until the pupil leaves Year 11.

== Extracurricular activities and school trips ==
Several school trips also take place throughout the year, excluding music concerts and GCSE subject trips. These include language trips to France, Germany and Spain, excursions or religious retreats to the Hayes Conference Centre and Hartington and the Hallam youth pilgrimage to Lourdes each June.

== School status ==
St. Mary's is a DfES designated Language College and Academy.

St Mary's performance is considerably higher than the local and national average, and was recognised as "particularly successful" by Ofsted in 1993–4 and 1997–8. It was then rated as 'Outstanding' in October 2012.

The school has no specific geographical catchment area (like other schools in the area) and so can choose pupils from church parishes in Chesterfield, though all Catholic applicants are generally accepted regardless of academic ability.

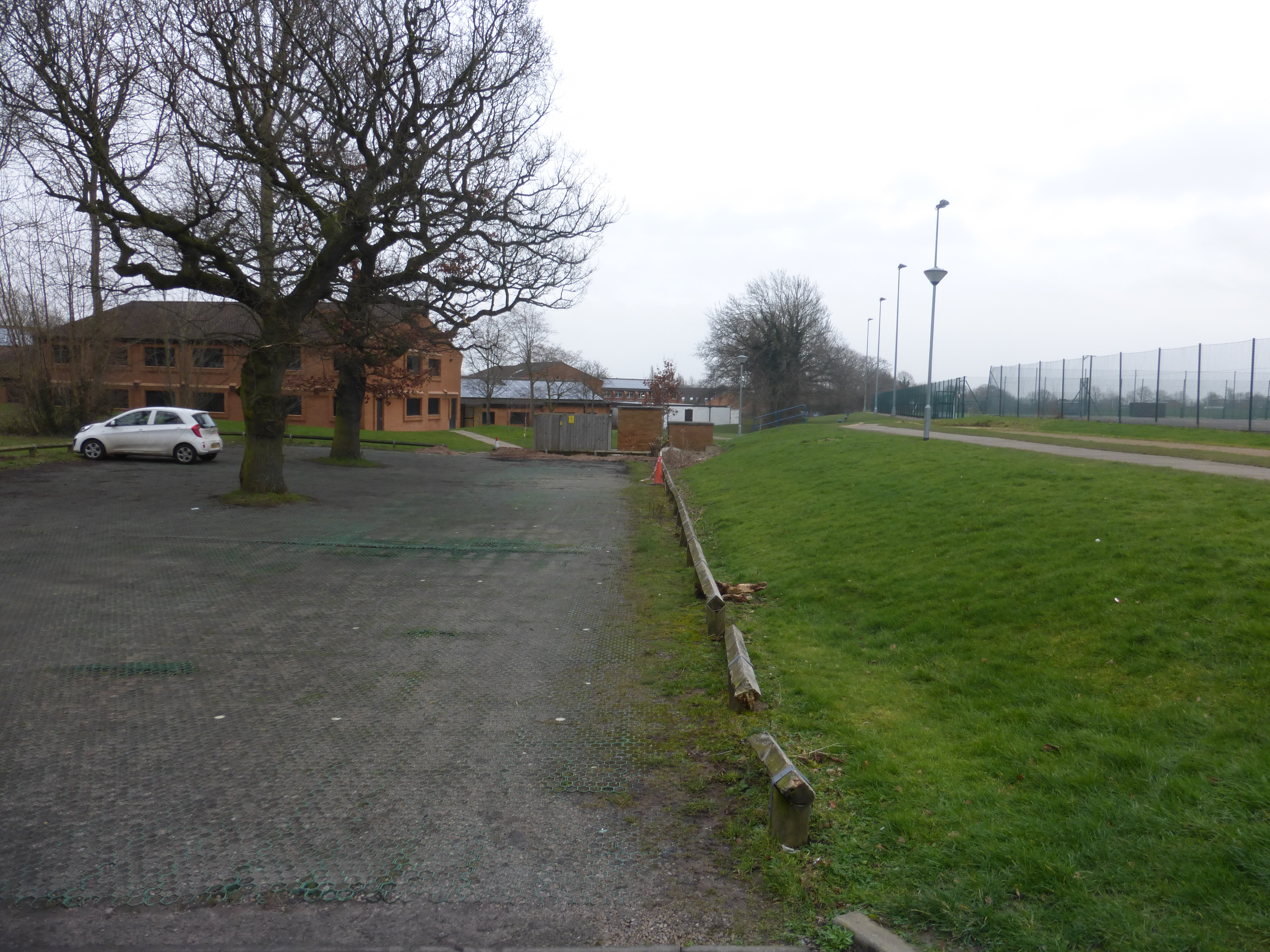
Looking East along the route of the old Water Lane, closed as a public highway in the 1970s following several fatal accidents.

== Notable alumni ==
- Charles Gerald Wood (1932-2020) - playwright
- Lee Benjamin Rowley (b. 1980) - Conservative MP for North East Derbyshire (UK Parliament constituency)
- Anna Fitzpatrick (b. 1989) - tennis player
- Jacob Harry Maguire (b. 1993) - professional footballer, Manchester United, England
- Laurence Henry Maguire (b. 1997) - footballer for Milton Keynes Dons.
