= Outwood Academy Newbold =

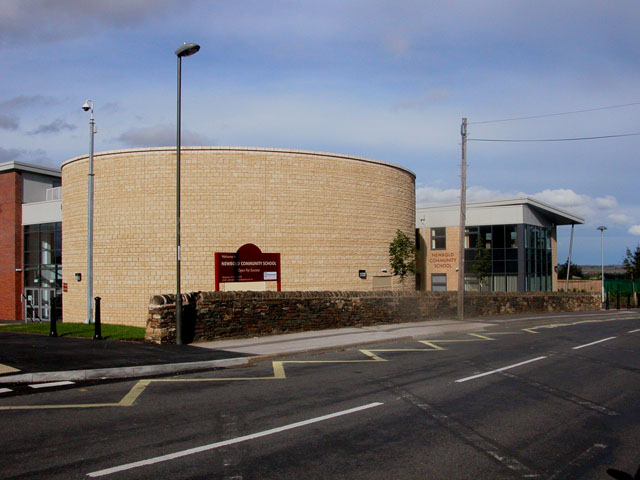
- Newbold Community School, viewed from Highfield Lane in 2006

Location
- Highfield Lane; Chesterfield, Derbyshire, S41 8BA; England
- Coordinates: 53.2525°N 1.4363°W

Information
- Type: Academy
- Local authority: Derbyshire
- Department for Education URN: 141377 Tables
- Ofsted: Reports
- Head Teacher: Rob Southern
- Gender: Mixed
- Age: 11 to 18
- Enrolment: 937
- Capacity: 1,139
- Website: Official website

Outwood Academy Newbold (formerly Newbold Community School, and before that The Violet Markham and Newbold Green Schools pre-merger) is a mixed secondary school and sixth form located in Chesterfield in the English county of Derbyshire.

The school is operated by Outwood Grange Academies Trust, a multi-academy trust, and the current principal is Robert Southern.

Facilities at the school include a sports hall, dance studio, drama studios, recording studio and all-weather sports facilities. The school also hosts the North East Derbyshire Music Centre.

== History ==
Newbold Community School was previously split across two locations known as Upper Site and Lower Site, which previously consisted of Newbold Green School and Violet Markham School respectively. The school relocated to a combined site and new building in 2006.

In November 2012, headteacher Jackie Overton was suspended, along with two other staff, for undisclosed reasons. Pupils were suspended for making 'malicious comments' regarding the incident. Shortly afterwards, the school was placed in special measures under the ruling of an acting headteacher, Martin Ebbage.

In January 2015 the school converted to academy status and was renamed Outwood Academy Newbold. The school is now part of the Outwood Grange Family of Schools.

The school has the highest number of exclusions locally.

== Academics ==
Outwood Academy Newbold offers GCSEs, BTECs and OCR Nationals as programmes of study for pupils, while students in the sixth form have the option to study from a range of A Levels and further BTECs.
