= Jeff Gilberthorpe =

British-Australian artist and author (1939–2021)

Jeff Gilberthorpe (1939 – 2021) was a British-Australian artist and author.

A dual British/Australian citizen, resident in Australia between 1982 and 2008, he is known primarily for "The Icon Collection" series of paintings. He is also the creator of the "Kookaburra Creek" paintings and stories and a noted wildlife artist who has exhibited several times for the Wildfowl Trust charity in Great Britain.

== Biography ==
=== Early life and education ===
Jeffrey Gilberthorpe was born in Chesterfield, Derbyshire in 1939.

Gilberthorpe exhibited artistic talent as a child, selling drawings and sketches locally into his teenage years. First exhibition, in the village of Ford in Shropshire, consisted of paintings of birds and wildlife. Gilberthorpe's Compulsory National Service in the RAF from 1960-1963 was followed by a stint at art college from 1964–65, but a rebellious nature and dislike of the forms and conventions of the time meant that this early attempt at formal artistic education was short-lived. He re-joined the R.A.F from 1966–74, and married wife Helen during this period. The couple had two children while resident in Cyprus. After leaving the air force, he returned to Britain and trained as a teacher at the University of Nottingham. His third and final child was born at this point. His first teaching post was at The Vintner's Boys School in Maidstone, Kent.

=== Australia ===
In 1982 he accepted a job at the new Fremantle Arts Centre in Fremantle, Western Australia. After a year in Perth the family moved across-country to Surfers Paradise in Queensland. After several years as a high-school teacher of art and technical drawing, mainly at Benowa, Merrimac and Beaudesert High Schools, he decided to work permanently as an artist and created the "Kookaburra Creek" story in the early 1990s, which developed and expanded into "The Icon Collection" series during the following years.

=== Death ===
Jeff Gilberthorpe died in Blackburn, Lancashire on 19 June 2021.

== Art ==
=== Kookaburra Creek ===
The first of the two series' of paintings for which he has become known, the artist developed the "Kookaburra Creek" concept in late 1992. A reaction to being stuck for hours behind a semi-trailer carrying a house up Tamborine Mountain in Queensland, this tale of a traditional "Queenslander" style house lifted out of the way of a deadly flood by its owner's judicious use of hot-air balloons led to a sequence of pictures detailing the flying house's journey over notable Australian landmarks, both natural and manmade, and illustrate the book Icon Collection. The Kookaburra Creek paintings are painted in acrylic and utilise a "magical realist" style. The artist has also written a novelisation and feature-film treatment, due for publication in the future.

=== The Icon Collection ===
Seeking to expand the "Kookaburra Creek" series onto the global stage, the artist developed "The Icon Collection". The story of an eccentric billionaire who decides to liberate the great buildings of the world by "kidnapping" them with hot-air balloons and stashing them on his island home/theme-park in the South Pacific now exists as two books. One of the paintings has also been produced as a jigsaw puzzle. The paintings are acrylics and are known for their intricate detail and massive size - "Mount Rushmore" is two-by-three metres, "Great Wall over Hong Kong" even bigger.
