= Chesterfield, Derbyshire =

Town in Derbyshire, England

Coordinates: 53.23633°N 1.4292058°W

Chesterfield
- Market town
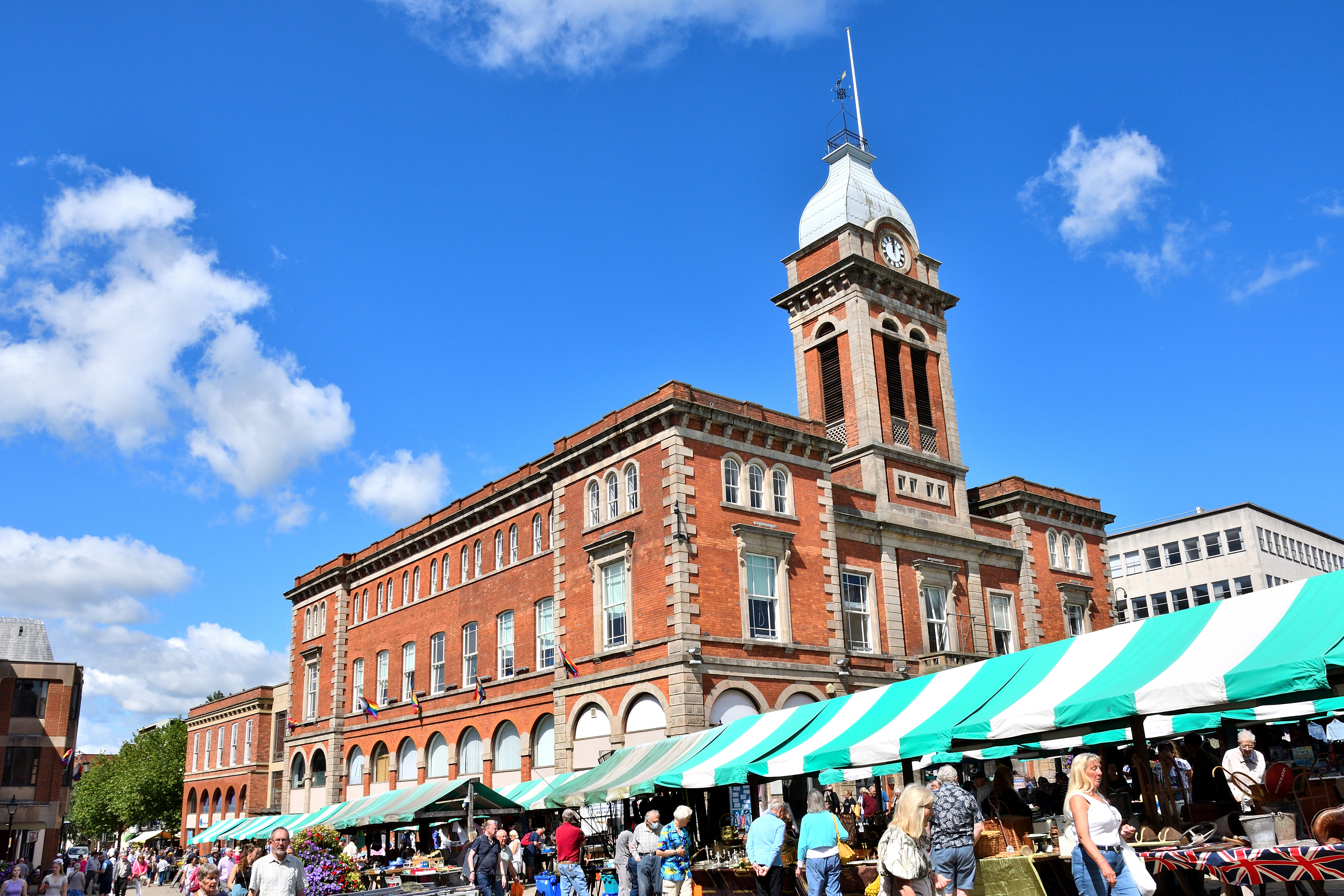
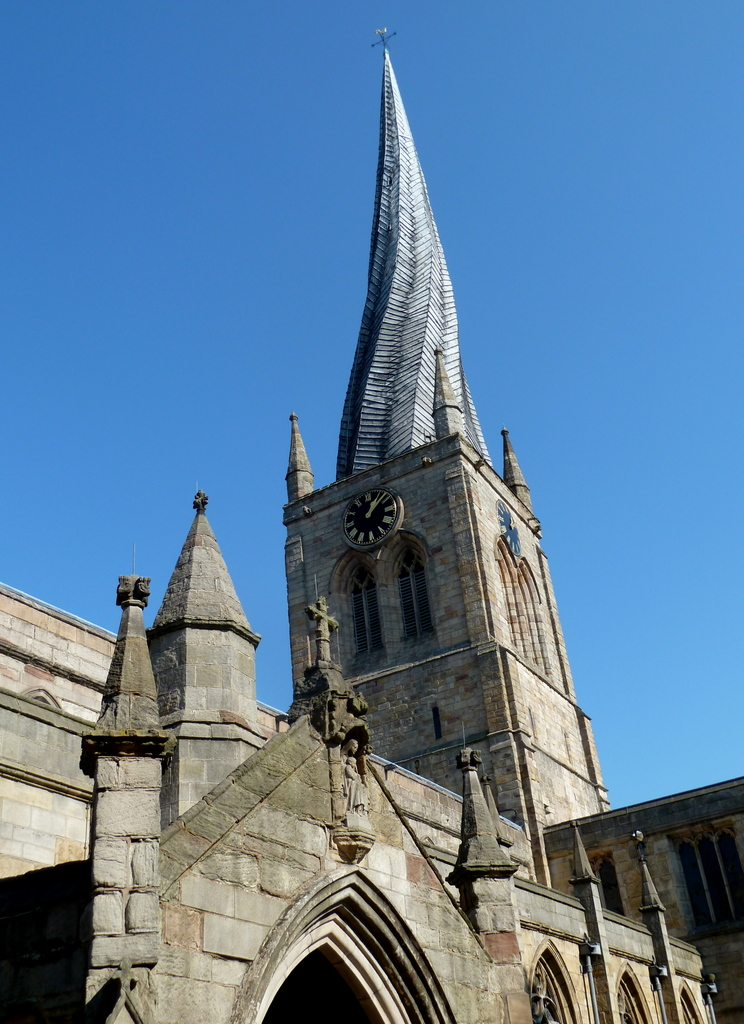
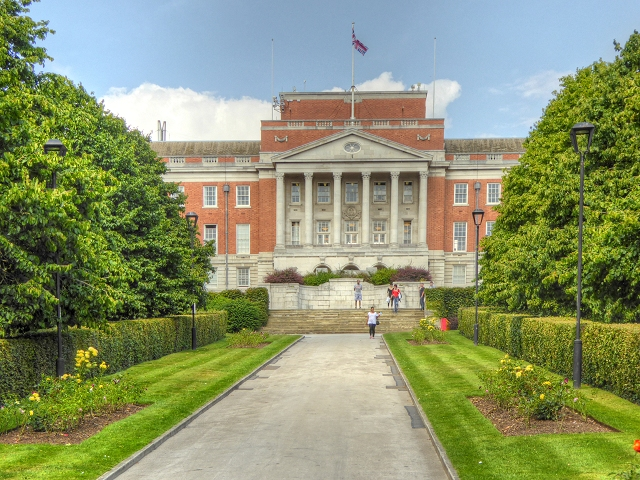
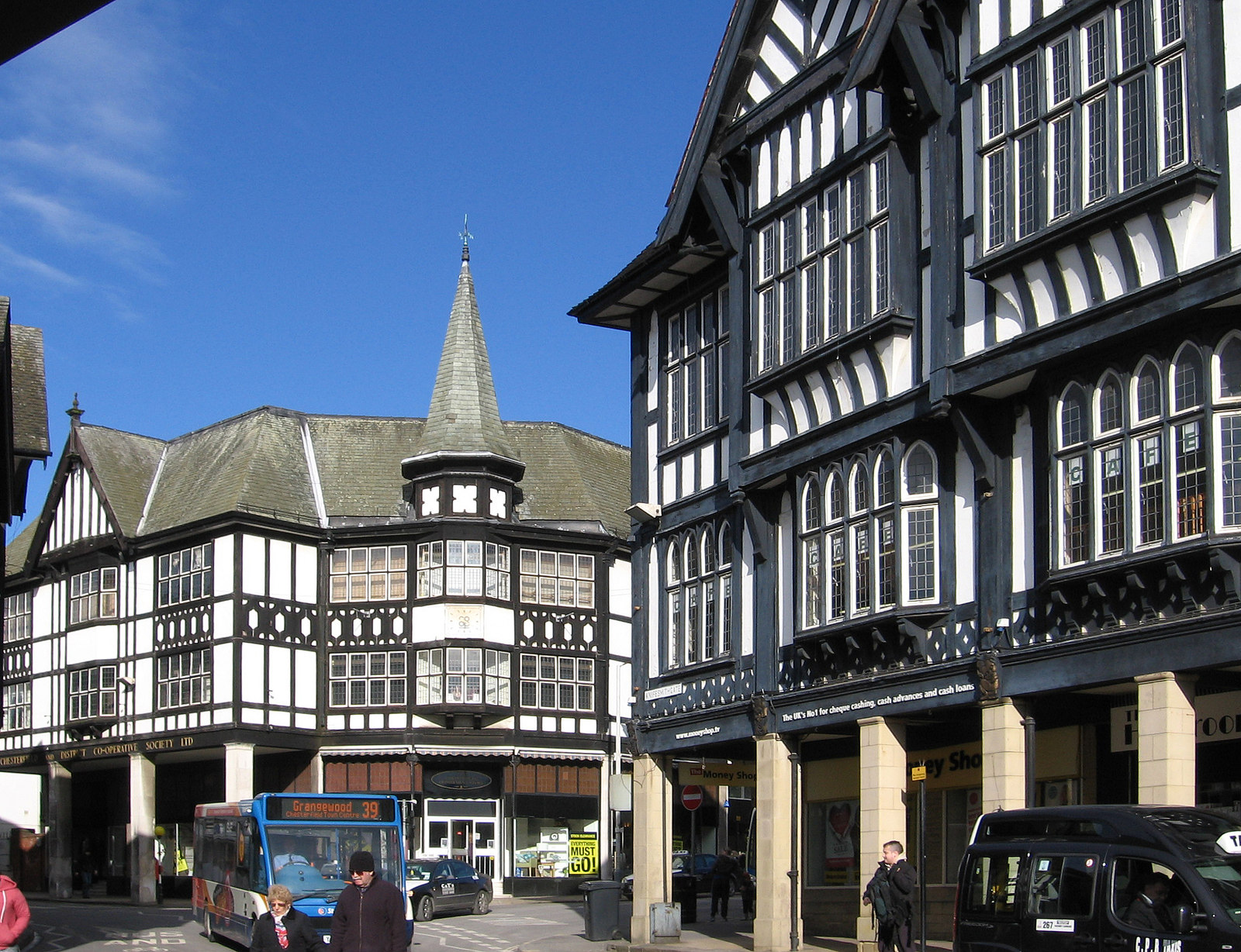
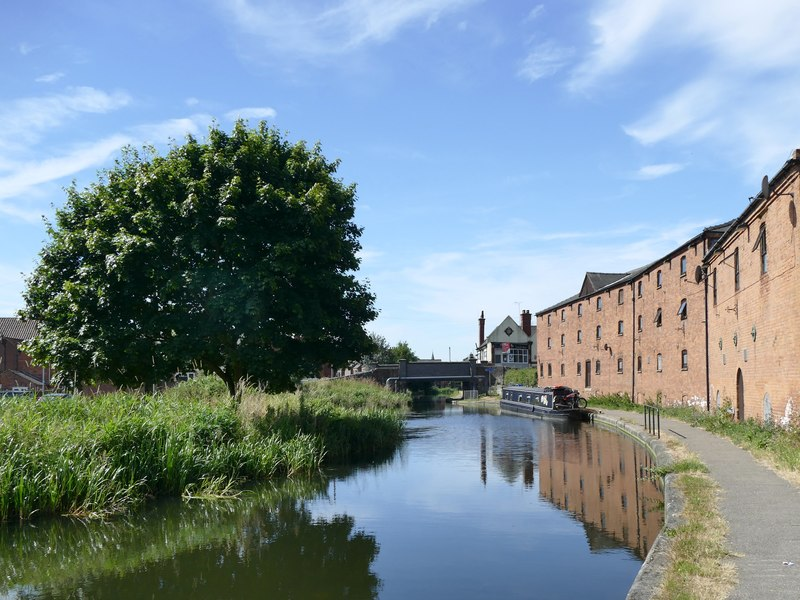
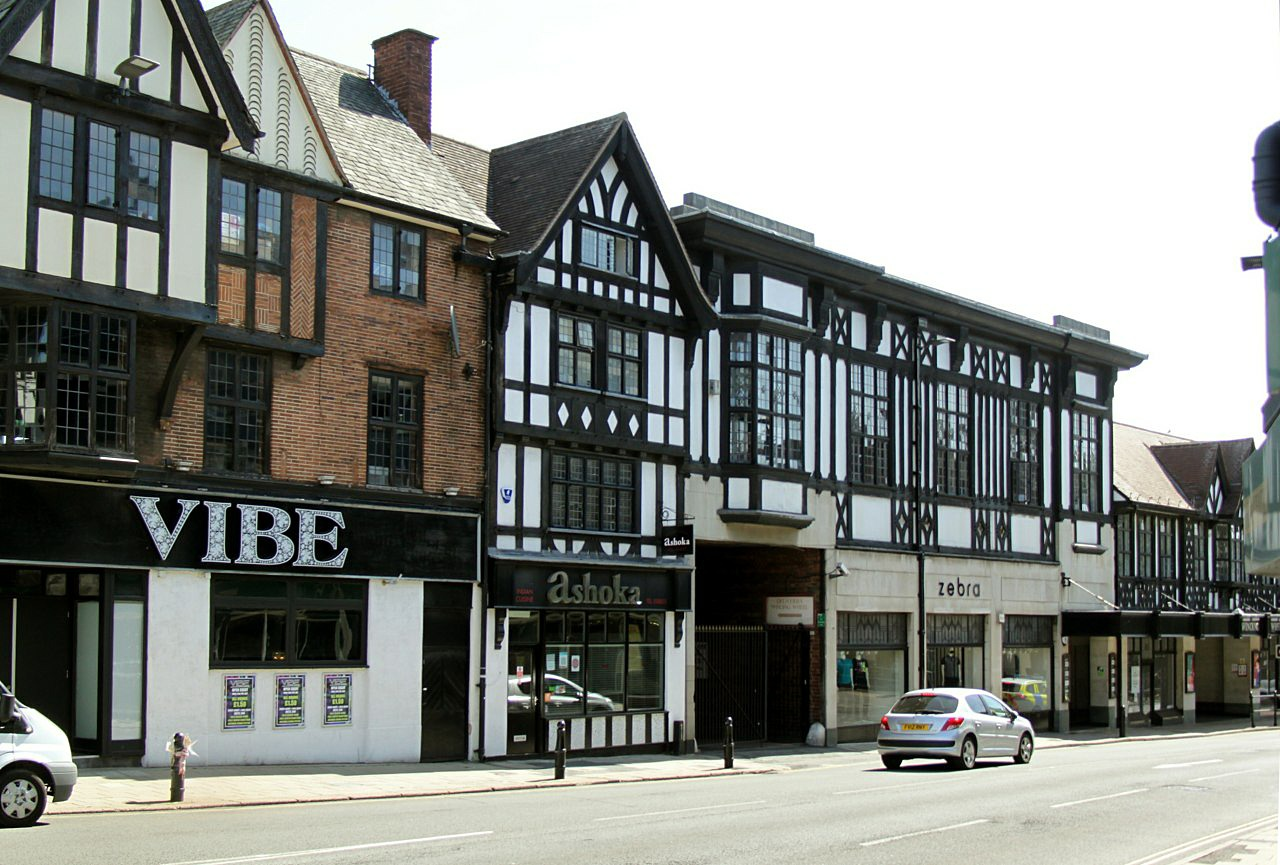
- Market Hall Crooked Spire Town Hall Knifesmithgate Chesterfield Canal Holywell Street

- Coat of arms

- Location within Derbyshire
- Area: 24.32 km^{2} (9.39 sq mi)
- Population: 76,402 (2021 Census)
  - Density: 3,142/km^{2} (8,140/sq mi)
- OS grid reference: SK384712
- District: Borough of Chesterfield
- Shire county: Derbyshire
- Region: East Midlands
- Country: England
- Sovereign state: United Kingdom
- Areas of the town: List: Ashgate; Birdholme; Boythorpe; Brampton; Brockwell; Brookside; Corbriggs (part); Dunston; Hady; Hasland; Loundsley Green; Newbold; New Whittington; Old Whittington; Spital; Tapton; Walton; Winswick; Whittington Moor
- Post town: Chesterfield
- Postcode district: S40-S45
- Dialling code: 01246
- Police: Derbyshire
- Fire: Derbyshire
- Ambulance: East Midlands
- UK Parliament: Chesterfield
- Website: chesterfield.gov.uk

Chesterfield is a market and industrial town in the county of Derbyshire, England. It is 24 miles (39 km) north of Derby and 11 miles (18 km) south of Sheffield at the confluence of the Rivers Rother and Hipper. The wider Borough of Chesterfield had a population of 103,569 in the 2021 Census. The town itself had a population of 76,402.

It has been traced to a transitory Roman fort dated to approximately AD 80-100. The name of the later Anglo-Saxon village comes from the Old English ceaster (Roman fort) and feld (pasture). It has a sizeable street market three days a week. The town sits on an old coalfield, but little visual evidence of mining remains since the closure of the final town centre mine nicknamed "The Green Room". The main landmark is the crooked spire of the Church of St Mary and All Saints.

== History ==
Chesterfield was in the Hundred of Scarsdale. The town received its market charter in 1204 from King John, which constituted the town as a free borough, granting the burgesses of Chesterfield the privileges of those of Nottingham and Derby. In 1266, the Battle of Chesterfield saw a band of rebel barons defeated by a royalist army.

Elizabeth I granted a charter in either 1594 or 1598, creating a corporation of a mayor, six aldermen, six brethren, and twelve capital burgesses. This remained its charter until the borough was reshaped under the Municipal Corporations Act 1835. It originally consisted only of the township of Chesterfield but absorbed some surrounding townships in 1892. There was a major extension when the borough absorbed New Whittington and Newbold urban district in 1920. Chesterfield's current boundaries date from 1 April 1974, when the Borough of Chesterfield was formed under the Local Government Act 1972 by amalgamating the municipal borough of Chesterfield, the urban district of Staveley and the parish of Brimington from Chesterfield Rural District.

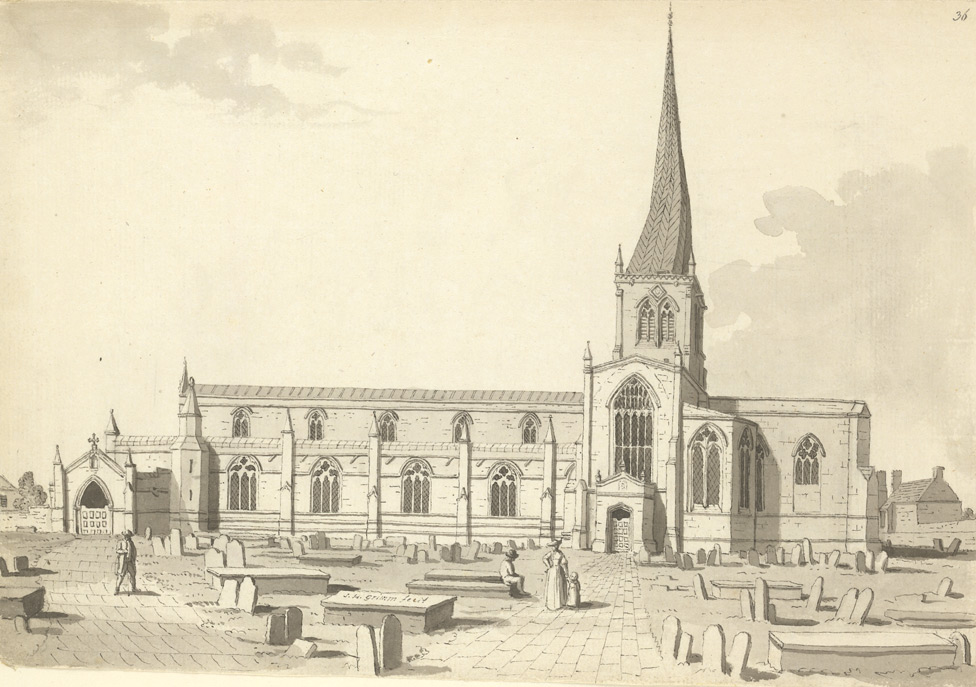
'The church in the 18th century as sketched by Samuel Hieronymus Grimm.'

Chesterfield benefitted much from the building of the Chesterfield Line – part of the Derby to Leeds railway (North Midland Line) begun in 1837 by George Stephenson. During the work, a sizeable seam of coal was discovered while the Clay Cross Tunnel was constructed. George then founded the Clay Cross company producing coal, iron ore, and limestone.

During his time in Chesterfield, Stephenson lived at Tapton House, remaining there until his death in 1848. He is interred in Trinity Church. A statue of him was erected outside Chesterfield railway station in 2006.

The population in 1841 was 6,212 inhabitants.

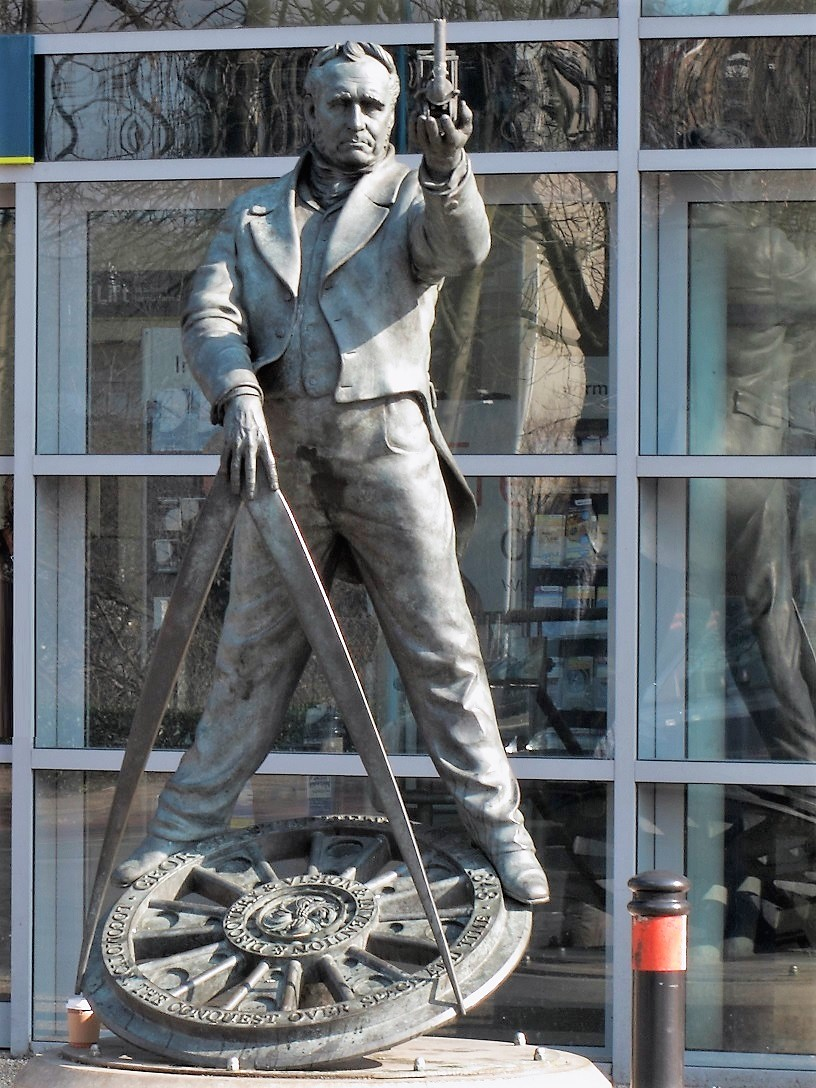
George Stephenson Statue, Chesterfield Train Station

== Governance ==
Local government in Chesterfield has a two-tier structure. At the upper tier of services such as consumer protection, education, main roads and social services is provided by Derbyshire County Council. At the lower tier, housing, planning, refuse collection and burial grounds are provided by Chesterfield Borough Council. There are two civil parishes in the borough, Brimington and Staveley.

Derbyshire County Council has 64 county councillors and Chesterfield Borough Council 40 local councillors, both elected every four years.

=== Coat of arms ===
The borough council uses armorial bearings originally granted to the previous borough corporation by letters patent dated 10 November 1955. The blazon of the arms is as follows:

Gules a Device representing a Pomegranate Tree as depicted on the ancient Common Seal of the Borough the tree leaved and eradicated proper flowered and fructed Or and for the Crest on a Wreath of the Colours Issuant from a Mural Crown Gules Masoned Or a Mount Vert thereon a Derby Ram passant guardant proper. Supporters: On the dexter side a Cock and on the sinister side a Pynot or Magpie proper each Ducally gorged Or

The shield is based on the borough's ancient common seal, believed to date from the earlier 16th century. The seal depicts a stylised pomegranate tree. When the arms were formally granted, the College of Arms expressed the view that the plant had been adopted by the town as a symbol of loyalty to the crown, as it had been a royal badge used by Catherine of Aragon, Henry VIII, and Mary Tudor. The crest depicts a Derby Ram, representing the county of Derbyshire, and a mural crown, suggestive of a town wall and thus borough status. The supporters represent the Cock and Pynot Inn, Old Whittington. The now Cock and Magpie Inn (53°16'13.1"N 1°25'34.3"W) is next to Revolution House, which was the site of a meeting between conspirators against James II in 1688. Among those meeting there were the Earl of Danby and Devonshire, marked by ducal crowns round the supporters' necks. The two birds stand on a compartment of rocks and moorland. The motto is "Aspire", a punning reference to the crooked spire of the parish church.

=== Combined authority ===
In March 2016 the borough council began a bid to join the Sheffield City Region Combined Authority, which was due to receive devolved powers. Derbyshire County Council opposed this and sought legal advice. In June 2017 Chesterfield Council withdrew its application, but is now a non-constituent partner.

== Geography ==
Chesterfield lies at the confluence of the River Rother and River Hipper at the Nottinghamshire, Derbyshire and Yorkshire Coalfield, in the eastern foothills of the Pennines. It is sometimes described as the "Gateway to the Peak", with the Peak District National Park to the west of the town.

Nearby areas of the South and West Yorkshire Green Belt can serve to block urban sprawl. Other local greenfield frameworks include "strategic gaps" to maintain the openness and landscape qualities of large open areas, and "green wedges" penetrating urban areas with recreational facilities.

=== Urban area ===
The wider Chesterfield Urban Area had a population of 112,664 at the 2021 Census, this included the town of Chesterfield along with its surrounding suburbs and the outlying villages and towns of Wingerworth, Staveley, Cutthorpe and Holymoorside.

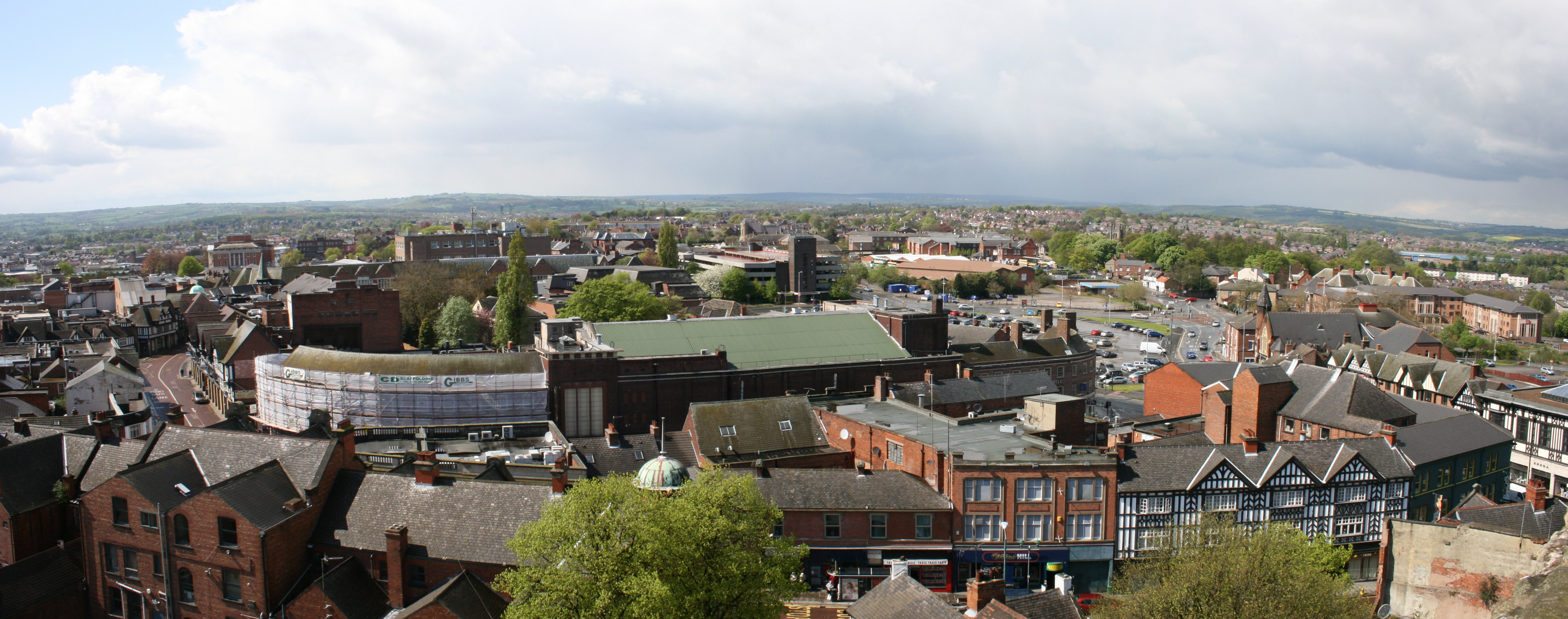
Panorama of Chesterfield taken from the Crooked Spire

== Politics ==
Chesterfield is part of the Chesterfield constituency; the Member of Parliament (MP) is Toby Perkins (Labour). The local council for Chesterfield is Chesterfield Borough Council.

== Economy ==
Since the cessation of coal mining, the economy around Chesterfield has undergone major change. The employment base has moved from the primary and secondary sectors towards the tertiary. The area sits on an old, large coalfield which had many collieries, including those in outlying areas which were historically part of Chesterfield Rural District: Clay Cross, Arkwright Town, Bolsover, Grassmoor, North Wingfield and Holmewood.

Between 1981 and 2002, 15,000 jobs in the coal industry were lost and all collieries closed, although open cast mining took place at Arkwright Town for a few years from November 1993. Many mine sites were restored by a contractor for Derbyshire County Council. Little evidence of mining remains. A cyclists' and walkers' route, the "Five Pits Trail", links some former mines; most are now indistinguishable from the surrounding countryside.

In the town, large factories and major employers have disappeared or relocated. Markham & Co. manufactured tunnel boring machines such as the one used for the Channel Tunnel. It was bought out by Norway's Kvaerner and later merged with Sheffield-based Davy. Its factory on Hollis Lane is now a housing estate; the former offices were turned into flats and serviced office suites. Dema Glass's factory near Lockoford Lane closed; the site is now host to a Tesco supermarket and the Proact Stadium, the home of Chesterfield Football Club. GKN closed its factory and the site is being turned into a business park.

Other companies have downsized sharply. Robinson's, makers of paper-based packaging, divested its health-care interests, which led to a marked fall in the workforce and facilities in Chesterfield. Trebor, once based on Brimington Road near Chesterfield railway station, merged with Bassetts sweets of Sheffield, was later taken over by Cadbury and relocated to a modern unit at Holmewood business park. The earlier factory site is now developed as part of a mixed residential and commercial site.

Manufacturing employment has fallen by a third since 1991, though the proportion of employees in manufacturing is still above the national average. Today, smaller firms are found on several industrial estates, the largest being at Sheepbridge. Business located on the estate includes SIG plc subsidiary Warren Insulations, Franke Sisons Ltd (founded in 1784 in Sheffield and among the first to manufacture stainless steel kitchen sinks in the 1930s), Rhodes Group and Chesterfield Felt.

Between the A61 and Brimington Road, there is a 40-acre (160,000 m^{2}) development site resulting from Arnold Laver relocating to a modern sawmill at Halfway, near Sheffield. The former sawmill has been demolished, and is now a mixed residential and commercial development called Chesterfield Waterside.

There is a Morrisons on the junction of Chatsworth Road (A619) and Walton Road (A632), a Sainsburys on Rother Way (A619 for Staveley), and a Tesco Extra on the junction of the A619 and A61 (known locally as Tesco Roundabout). The Institute of Business Advisers is based on Queen Street North. Chesterfield Royal Hospital is on the A632 towards Calow and Bolsover. It has the only accident and emergency department in Derbyshire outside Derby.

The Chesterfield and North Derbyshire Branch of the RSPCA is located in the town, and serves the North East Derbyshire area.

The Royal Mail's Pensions Service Centre is near the town in Boythorpe Road, in Rowland Hill House, which also serves other administrative functions. There is a Post Office Ltd building in the town at West Bars called Future Walk. Formerly this was Chetwynd House, now demolished and replaced by the new building.

=== Shopping, entertainment and leisure ===
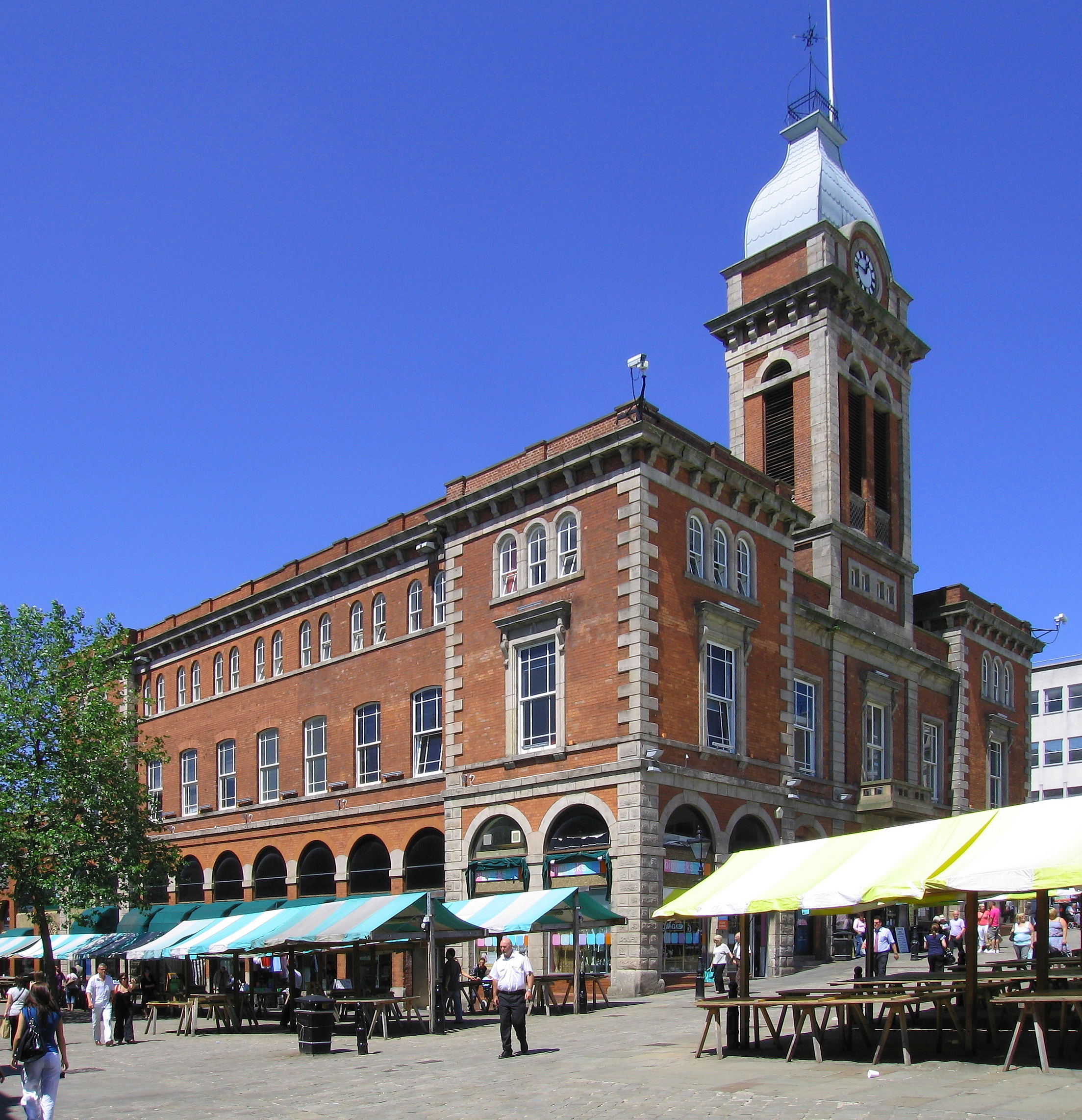
Part of Chesterfield's market and the Market Hall

The town centre of Chesterfield has retained much of its pre-war plan. Chesterfield Market is one of the largest open-air markets in Britain, the stalls sitting either side of the Market Hall. In the middle of town, a collection of narrow medieval streets makes up The Shambles, which houses the Royal Oak, one of Britain's oldest pubs.

Near Holywell Cross is what was (until 2013) Chesterfield's largest department store, the Co-operative or Co-op. The main building opened in 1938, and now occupies the majority of Elder Way, including an enclosed bridge, and part of Knifesmithgate. Here the façade is in the mock-Tudor style fashionable in the 1930s, which still dominates the north side of Knifesmithgate. In 2001, the Chesterfield and District Co-operative Society was incorporated into a larger regional Midlands Co-operative Society Limited, now the biggest independent retail society in the UK. Owing to a decline in retail sales, the large home and fashion Co-op department store closed at the end of July 2013, The area has had some redevelopment with a Premier Inn and retail stores now open.

==== The Pavements ====
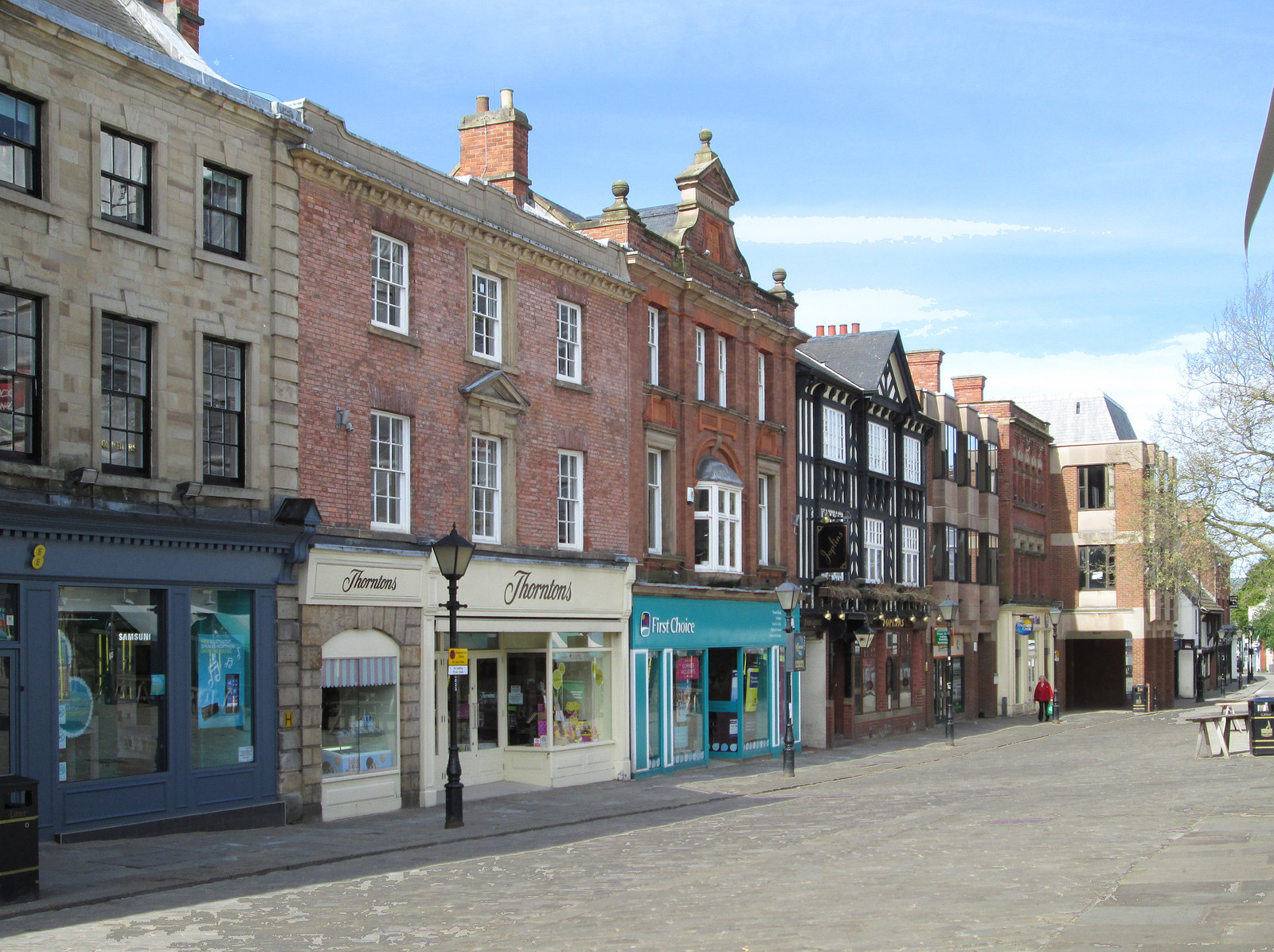
Low Pavement, Chesterfield

In the late 1970s the area between Low Pavement (in the Market Square) and New Beetwell Street was redeveloped to build "The Pavements" Shopping Centre, known by some as The Precinct. The existing buildings were demolished except for the façades on Lower Pavement. The shopping centre was opened in November 1981 by the Prince and Princess of Wales. It has entrances opposite Chesterfield Market and escalators leading down to New Beetwell St and the bus station. An enclosed bridge links the site to a multi-storey car park built at the same time, adjacent to the town's coach station.

Chesterfield's multi-storey library stands just outside The Pavements in New Beetwell St. The building was opened in 1985. In annual figures compiled by the Chartered Institute of Public Finance and Accountancy it ranked fifth in the UK for number of loans in 2008, rising one place on the previous year. The area beside the library was redeveloped, but retains the old narrow passageways while accommodating small shop units and offices.

On 27 June 2007, the Somerfield store in the Precinct was gutted in a fire in which the roof collapsed, a few shoppers suffering minor injuries. The fire reportedly started after a welding torch being used to repair flood damage had been left ignited. It started at 13:10 on 27 June and was not extinguished until 23:30 that day. After the fire, Somerfield decided to cease trading in Chesterfield. The unit re-opened in September 2008 as a Tesco Metro store.

==== Vicar Lane ====
Vicar Lane was redeveloped in 2000 as a pedestrianised open-air shopping centre creating two new shopping streets. This meant demolishing almost all of the existing buildings, including a Woolworths branch and a small bus station. It now includes major chains such as H&M and Iceland. The development had been planned in the 1980s but delayed for economic reasons. A multi-storey car park on Beetwell St was added under the revised plan. The area lies between the Pavements Centre and markets and the crooked spire.

==== Food and drink ====
Nightlife is centred mainly in the Church Way, Holywell Street and Corporation Street areas. The Brampton Mile, west of the town centre is known for the number of public houses on a 1 mile (1.6 km) stretch of Chatsworth Road.

In February 2006, the first international gluten free beer festival was held in Chesterfield. The Campaign for Real Ale (CAMRA) hosted the event as part of its regular beer festival in the town.

==== The arts ====
The Winding Wheel, hitherto an Odeon Cinema, is a venue for concerts, exhibitions, conferences, dinners, family parties, dances, banquets, wedding receptions, meetings, product launches and lectures. Past notable performers include Pulp, Bob Geldof, The Proclaimers and Paddy McGuinness. It also hosts performances of the Chesterfield Symphony Orchestra.

The "Pomegranate Theatre", formerly the Chesterfield Civic Theatre and previously the Stephenson Memorial Theatre, is a listed Victorian building in what is now known as the Stephenson Memorial Hall. It has an auditorium that seats about 500 people. Shows are given throughout the year. Also in the Stephenson Memorial Hall is the Chesterfield Museum, opened in 1994. Until 1984 it was used as the town's main library. The museum is owned by Chesterfield Borough Council, as are the Winding Wheel and the Pomegranate Theatre. The box office for both venues is located in the entrance area of the theatre.

The Royal Mail building, Future Walk, in West Bars, was once the site of Chetwynd House, referred to locally as the AGD. Here a work by sculptor Barbara Hepworth Curved Reclining Form or Rosewall was prominently displayed for many years and nicknamed Isaiah by local critics, as it resembled a crude human face with one eye higher than the other ("eye's 'igher"). The work was due to be sold in 2005, but reprieved as a work of national significance. Other artworks of note include A System of Support and Balance by Paul Lewthwaite, outside Chesterfield Magistrates' Court.

== Transport ==
=== Roads ===
The town is bisected north-south by the A61, with a dual carriageway from the town centre right into Sheffield. The A617 links to Mansfield, the A619 provides an entry point to the Peak District (eventually joining the A6 near Bakewell) and the A632 connects Bolsover with Matlock.

The M1 motorway passes Chesterfield to the east, at a distance of 6 miles (9.7 km) to junction 29a. Three junctions provide access to the town:

- Junction 29 at Heath to the south, via the A617 dual carriageway.
- Junction 29a at Markham Vale in Duckmanton, via the A632
- Junction 30 to the north, via the A619.

=== Buses and coaches ===
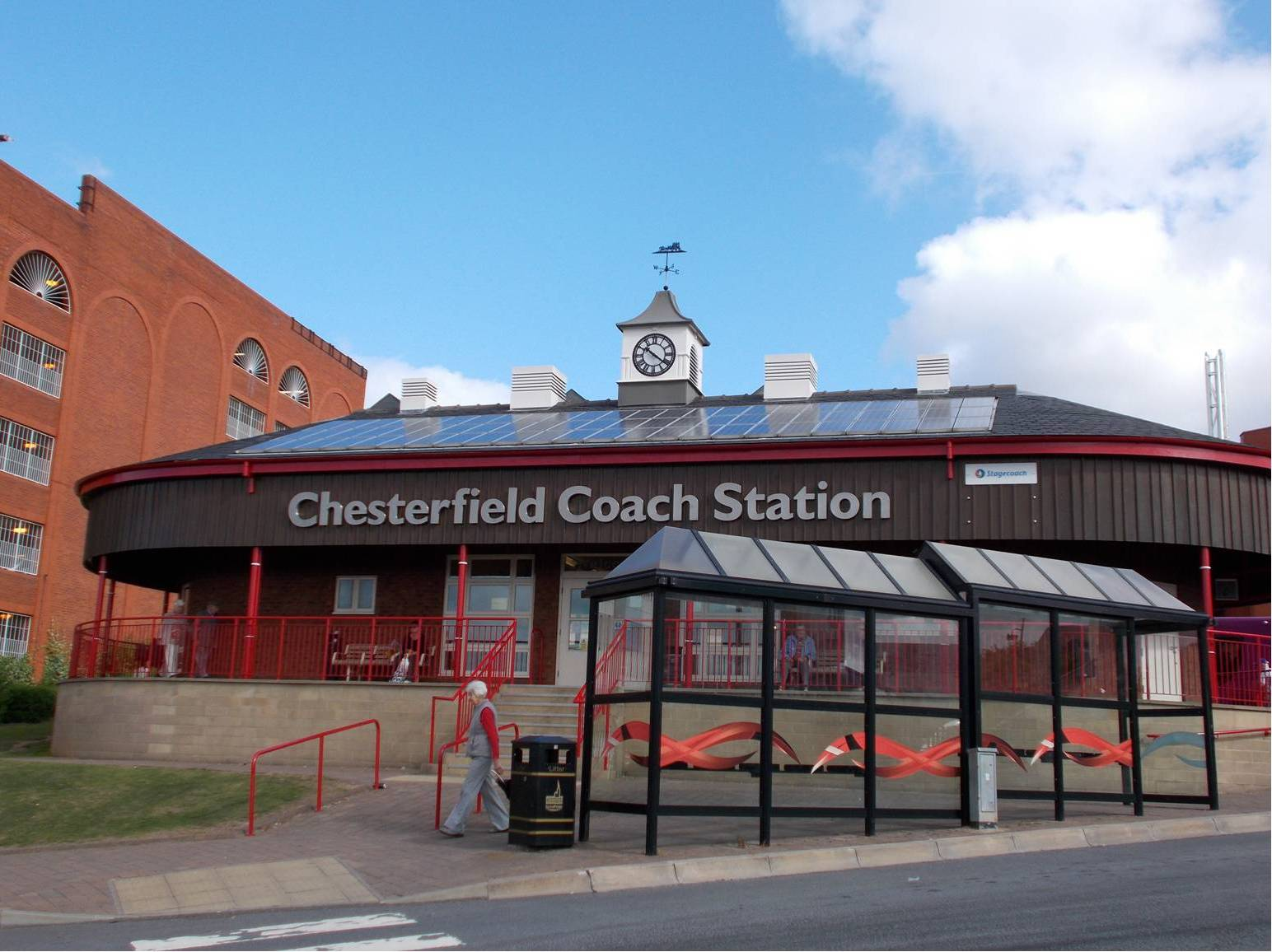
Chesterfield coach station

Stagecoach East Midlands and Stagecoach Yorkshire are the predominant bus operators in Chesterfield; others include Trentbarton and TM Travel.

Buses stop in several areas around the town centre, rather than at a central bus station. The Stagecoach depot at Stonegravels is notable for its size and many vehicles stored there are not in regular use; it was Chesterfield Corporation's bus depot.

Chesterfield coach station opened in 2005, on the site of the old bus station; it is served by Stagecoach and National Express coaches. Routes connect the town with Bradford, Leeds, Leicester, London and Sheffield.

=== Railways ===
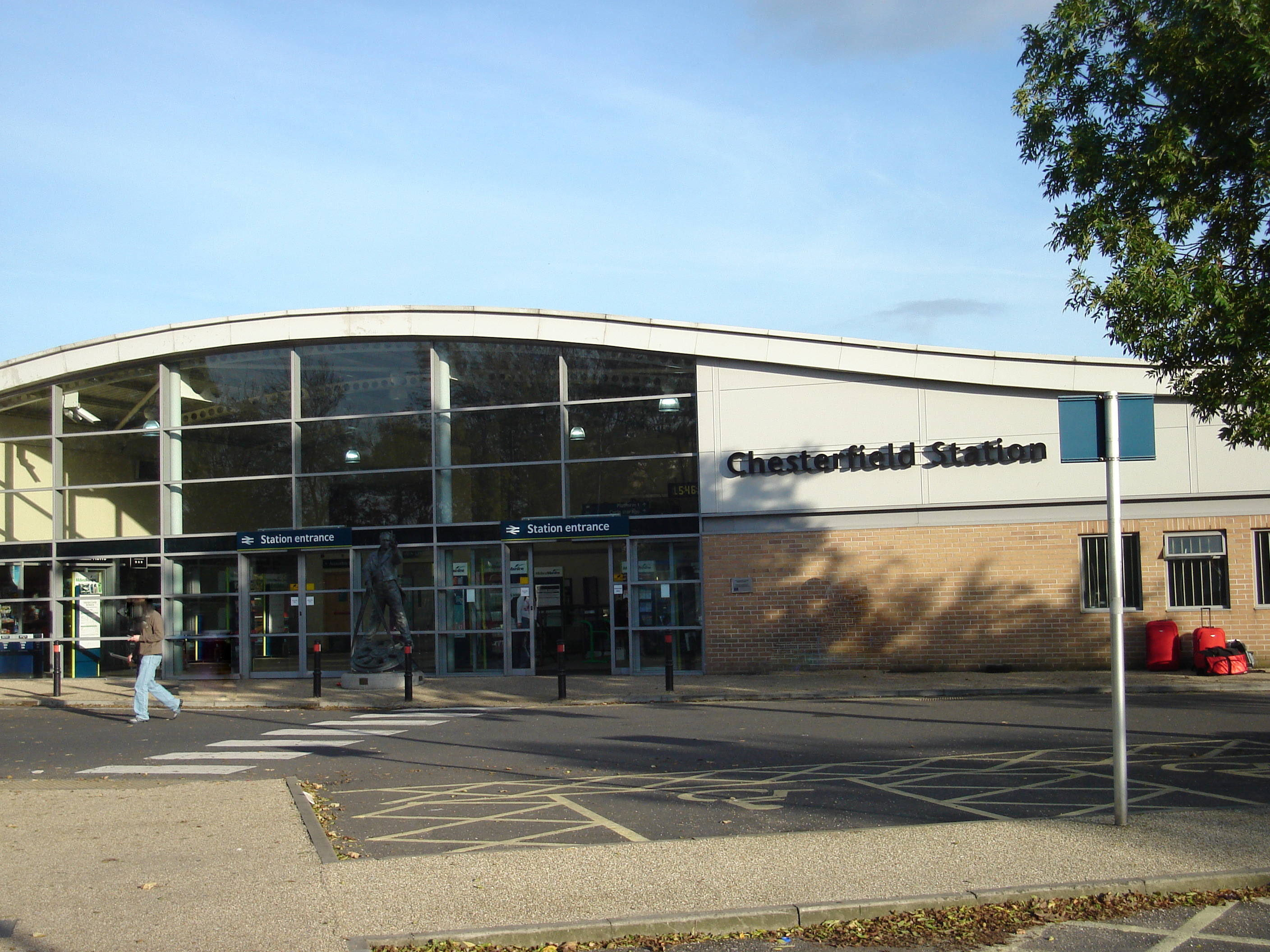
Chesterfield railway station

Chesterfield railway station lies on the Midland Main Line. It is served by three train operating companies:

- East Midlands Railway operates inter-city routes to London St Pancras, Derby, Sheffield, Liverpool Lime Street, Nottingham and Norwich
- CrossCountry runs long-distance inter-city services to Sheffield, York, Newcastle, Edinburgh Waverley, Derby, Reading, Bournemouth, Bristol Temple Meads, Plymouth and Penzance
- Northern Trains operates a services between Leeds and Nottingham.

Chesterfield once had two other railway stations:

- Chesterfield Market Place had been the terminus of the Chesterfield–Lincoln line. It was built in 1897 by the Lancashire, Derbyshire and East Coast Railway (LD&ECR); it closed in 1951, due to the prohibitive cost of maintaining Bolsover Tunnel and the nearby Doe Lea Viaduct, which were both affected by mining subsidence. No original buildings remain. The site is now owned by the Post Office.
- Chesterfield Central closed in 1963, in conjunction with a general wind-down of passenger train activity on the Great Central Railway (GCR). Chesterfield's inner relief road, part of the A61, now runs along some of the disused track bed. The station was demolished in 1973. Part of the railway tunnel under the town still exists off Dixon's Road, the northern entrance has been sealed off.

The railways crossed each other at Horns Bridge, the Midland Main Line passing over the GCR loop into Chesterfield and the LD&ECR passing both on a 700 feet (210 m) viaduct. Horns Bridge has been redeveloped since the last two railways closed. Horns Bridge roundabout on the A61 Derby Road and A617 Lordsmill Street now occupies the site. The viaduct was demolished in the 1970s.

Chesterfield tramway system was built in 1882 and closed in 1927.

=== Taxis ===
The main taxi ranks are in Elder Way, Knifesmithgate and outside the railway station. Chesterfield taxis are recognisably black with distinctive white bonnets and boots.

=== Air ===
The nearest licensed airfield is Netherthorpe Aerodrome, near Worksop in Nottinghamshire, but has only 553 metres of grass runway. Air passengers may use East Midlands, Leeds Bradford, Manchester and Birmingham airports, all within two hours by road.

=== Canal ===
The Chesterfield Canal linked the town to a national network of waterways through the 19th century. Overtaken by rail and then road for freight transport, it fell into disuse, but has been partially restored since the mid-20th century for leisure use. However, the section through Chesterfield remains isolated from the rest of the waterway network.

== Media ==
Local news and television programmes are provided by BBC Yorkshire and ITV Yorkshire. Television signals are received from the Emley Moor TV transmitter and local TV transmitter situated north of the town.

The Chesterfield transmitter opened as an ITA colour site on 1 September 1971 at Unstone. The BBC added a radio transmitter in June 1991.

Radio stations are BBC Radio Sheffield, Greatest Hits Radio North Derbyshire (formerly Peak FM), Hits Radio South Yorkshire and the local internet radio stations: North Derbyshire Radio, Elastic FM and Spire Radio.

Also in the town are the headquarters of the Derbyshire Times, the local newspaper, which does not cover all of the county.

== Education ==
=== Primary schools ===
- Abercrombie Primary School
- Brockwell Junior School
- Cavendish Junior School
- Christ Church CofE Primary School
- Deer Park Primary School
- Hady Primary School
- Holme Hall Primary School
- Spire Junior School
- St Joseph's Catholic and CofE (VA) Primary School
- St Mary's Catholic Primary
- Walton Peak Flying High Primary and Nursery Academy
- William Rhodes Primary and Nursery School

=== Secondary schools ===
- Brookfield Community School, Brookside
- Outwood Academy Hasland Hall, Hasland
- Outwood Academy Newbold, Newbold
- Parkside Community School, Boythorpe
- St Mary's Catholic High School, Newbold

=== Colleges ===
- Chesterfield College

== Religious sites ==
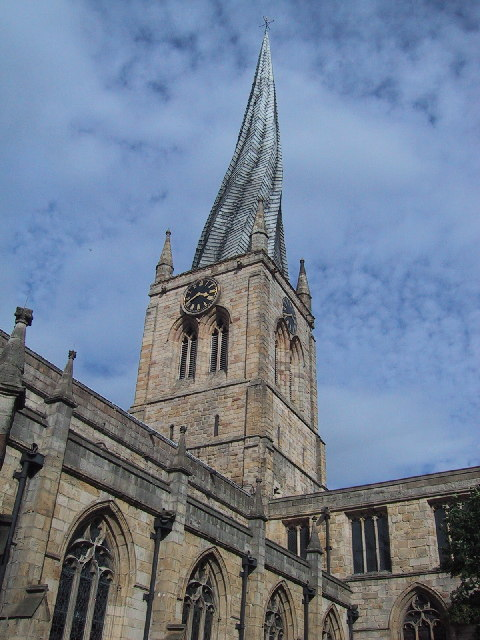
The crooked spire today

The twist in the Spire

Chesterfield is perhaps best known for the crooked spire of its Church of Saint Mary and All Saints and is why the local football team is known as The Spireites.

The spire is twisted 45 degrees and leans 9 feet 6 inches (2.90 m) from its true centre. Folklore recounts that a Bolsover blacksmith mis-shod the Devil, who leapt over the spire in pain, knocking it out of shape. Realistically, the lean has been ascribed to an absence of skilled craftsmen just 12 years after the Black Death, the use of unseasoned timber or insufficient cross-bracing. Another explanation is that it was caused by heat expansion after the 17th-century addition of 33 tons of lead sheeting to the spire, resting on 14th-century bracing not designed to carry such weight.

The tower on which the spire sits contains ten bells cast in 1947 by the Whitechapel Bell Foundry in London, replacing a previous ring. The heaviest weighs 25 long hundredweight (2,800 lb; 1,300 kg).

Also in Chesterfield is the Annunciation Church, founded by the Jesuits in 1854 and designed by Joseph Hansom.

== Sport and leisure ==
=== Football ===
Chesterfield F.C. is nicknamed the Spireites, after the crooked spire of St Mary's Church. The club formerly played at the Recreation Ground (usually referred to as Saltergate after the road on which it was located), but moved to a new stadium on the old Dema Glass site north of the town in Whittington Moor at the start of the 2010–11 season. The team has mostly competed in the third and fourth tiers of English football but dropped down to the National League for season 2018–19. Having won the National league title in May 2025, Chesterfield returned to the EFL League 2 as of August 2025.

Chesterfield Ladies FC have women's and girls' teams and is based at Queen's Park Annexe; it plays in the Sheffield and Hallamshire Girls County League.

The town also has an amateur Sunday football league that hosts over 100 teams on a Sunday morning. The Chesterfield and District Sunday Football League consists of nine divisions and three cup competitions.

=== Rugby Union ===
Chesterfield Panthers Rugby Union Football Club was formed in 1919 and played its first game in 1920. It fields three men's senior squads, a senior ladies squad and numerous junior teams. The club moved for the 2013–14 season from its Stonegravels site to a new purpose-built ground at 2012 Dunston Road. The facilities include three pitches, one floodlit, numerous changing rooms, and a large open-plan bar area. The first XV won the Midlands North 4 championship in 2013–14 and returned to the Midlands North 3 for the first time in 25 years.

Chesterfield Spires RLFC was a rugby league club formed in the town in 2003 and currently playing in the RL Merit League. In 2008 it merged with the North Derbyshire Chargers. Chesterfield Forgers RLFC, a new club who transferred from Sheffield, began playing in the Merit League at the Panthers ground in 2025.

=== Cricket ===
Chesterfield Cricket Club is an amateur cricket club based at Queen's Park. The club has a history dating back to the mid-18th century. Chesterfield CC compete in the Derbyshire County Cricket League, a designated ECB Premier League, at the top level for recreational club cricket in Derbyshire. Chesterfield were League Champions in 2008 and are one of only three clubs to have remained in the top flight of the League since it was created in 1999. The club have three senior teams that compete on Saturdays in the Derbyshire County Cricket League, a Sunday XI in the Mansfield and District Cricket League and an established junior training section that play competitive cricket in the North Derbyshire Youth Cricket League.

=== Hockey ===
Chesterfield Hockey Club, founded in 1899, competes in the Yorkshire and North East Region Hockey League. The side has typically been mid-table or battled against relegation until its greatest success, when it recruited the Australian import striker Adam Clifford from Tasmania. During his two seasons Clifford scored over 50 goals and Chesterfield narrowly lost the league in the final weeks by a single point.

=== Athletics ===
Chesterfield & District Athletic Club are based at Tupton Hall School, Tupton, Chesterfield, and provides training and events for juniors and seniors.

=== Swimming ===
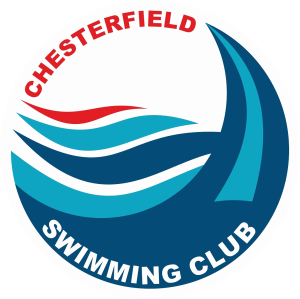

Chesterfield Swimming Club, the largest competitive swimming club in North Derbyshire, is based at the Queen's Park Sports Centre in Boythorpe Road. In October 2011 it began delivering the programme for Derventio eXcel (Performance Swim Squad for Derbyshire) for the North East of the county. In 2012, Chesterfield SC took part in the Arena National Swimming League and achieved promotion to the top division at the first attempt. Further success raised its membership.

=== Tennis ===
Chesterfield Lawn Tennis Club are members of the Sheffield and District League, and is the largest Tennis centre in North Derbyshire with 3 Indoor and 7 Outdoor Courts.

=== Golf ===
Chesterfield Golf Club was founded in 1897, and is an 18-hole golf course situated near Walton, Chesterfield.

=== Queen's Park ===
Queen's Park, just outside the town centre, recently benefitted from a multimillion-pound programme of investment, allowing it to host county cricket again. Alderman T P Wood, Mayor of Chesterfield in 1886 proposed that local land be acquired by the Local Board to create a public park for the Golden Jubilee of Queen Victoria in 1887. It officially opened in 1893. The park includes a cricket field, pavilion, lake, conservatory, bandstand, and miniature railway. A further 13 acres (5.3 ha) of land south of the park was acquired as a memorial to Queen Victoria in 1901 and laid out as a recreation ground known as Queen's Park Annex.

=== Queen's Park Sports Centre ===
Queens Park Sports Centre was constructed in the mid and late 20th century within Queen's Park, adjacent to its western boundary. It included a swimming pool, gym, several indoor courts (for various sports) and several more outdoor tennis courts, before it was closed in December 2015.

A new £11.2 million Queen's Park Sports Centre opened in January 2016 on the Queen's Park Annex south of Queen's Park. It includes an eight-lane swimming pool, a learner pool, a gym, an eight-court sports hall, squash courts, training rooms, an exercise-class studio, a climbing wall and a café.

=== Skate park ===
A 565 m^{2} (6,080 sq ft) skate park, built by Freestyle, opened in June 2009 on land behind Ravenside Retail Park and B&Q, near Horns Bridge.

A speedway training track once operated at Glasshouse Farm in the early 1950s.

=== Motorsports ===
The GB3 and GB4 team Hillspeed are based in Markham Vale. Hillspeed previously raced in the BTCC.

== Public services ==
Chesterfield is policed by Derbyshire Constabulary. Chesterfield Police Station in New Beetwell St is the North Division Headquarters.

Chesterfield has two NHS hospitals, Chesterfield Royal Hospital NHS Foundation Trust in Calow, with maternity services and accident and emergency department, and the smaller Walton Hospital run by Derbyshire Healthcare NHS Foundation Trust. In 1984, the entire site of the old Chesterfield Royal Hospital in the town centre was purchased by an orthopaedic surgeon, who converted the lower portion of the hospital, adjoining Infirmary Road and Durrant Road, into the Alexandra Private Hospital.

Chesterfield is covered by the East Midlands Ambulance Service (EMAS) and the Derbyshire, Leicestershire & Rutland Air Ambulance.

Chesterfield is served by Derbyshire Fire and Rescue Service. The fire station at Whittington Moor was demolished in 2012 after the service relocated to a newly built station at Spire Walk Business Park.

== Notable people ==
Notable people from Chesterfield in alphabetical order. Information not referenced on the person's page must be referenced here.

- Olave Baden-Powell (1889–1977), wife of Robert Baden-Powell and Chief Guide from 1918
- Nick Barker (born 1973), British drummer
- Steven Blakeley (born 1982), actor in television drama series Heartbeat
- B. V. Bowden, Baron Bowden (1910–1989), scientist and educationist, associated with the development of UMIST as a university
- Gordon Brown (Australian Politician) (1885–1967), President of the Australian Senate
- Paul Burrell (born 1958), former royal butler and author
- Martyn P. Casey (born 1960), bassist with The Bad Seeds and formerly Grinderman
- Barbara Castle (1910–2002), MP for Blackburn East Labour cabinet minister
- Paul Cummins (born 1977), artist, creator of Blood Swept Lands and Seas of Red
- William Henry Cutts (1828-1897), physician
- Jonno Davies (born 1992), actor
- Blair Dunlop (born 1992), musician and actor
- Stanley Dyson (1920–2007), art teacher and Outsider Art contributor
- Jane Freeman (1871–1963), artist
- Francis Frith (1822–1898), photographer and liberal Quaker
- Jeff Gilberthorpe (1939–2021), wildlife artist and author
- Simon Groom (born 1950), Blue Peter children's television programme presenter
- Jo Guest (born 1972), former glamour model and Page Three girl
- Lisa Hall (living), musician
- W. E. Harvey (1852–1914), Lib/Lab Member of Parliament (MP) for North East Derbyshire
- Sir John Hurt (1940–2017), actor, knighted in 2015 for services to drama
- Gwen John (1878–1953), playwright and author
- Winifred Jones (died 1955), suffragist
- Winifred Kastner (1903–1987), Australian community leader
- Jeremy Kemp (1935–2019), actor in the television series Z-Cars
- Frank Lee (1867–1941), Labour Party MP
- Violet Markham (1872–1959), writer, social reformer and first female Mayor of Chesterfield
- Rik Makarem (born 1982), actor in TV soap opera Emmerdale
- Emma Miller (1839-1917), suffragist and labor organiser
- Henry Normal (born 1956), writer, poet and television producer
- Paul Patterson (born 1947), composer and Royal Academy of Music professor
- Johnny Pearson (1925–2011), composer of television theme tunes and pianist
- Josiah Pearson (1841-1895), Anglican Bishop
- Samuel Pegge (1704–1796), antiquary and Vicar of Old Whittington
- Steve Perez (born 1956), entrepreneur and rally driver who founded Global Brands which produces alcoholic drinks
- Toby Perkins (born 1970), British Labour Party politician, MP for Chesterfield since 2010 and Shadow Business Minister
- Claire Price (born 1972), stage and television actress
- Sir Robert Robinson (1886–1975), Nobel Prize in Chemistry for his work on plant dyestuffs (anthocyanins) and alkaloids
- Lee Rowley (born 1980), Conservative MP for North East Derbyshire
- Sir Robin Saxby (born 1947), technology entrepreneur, retired founding CEO of Arm Holdings
- Mark Shaw (born 1961), lead singer of 1980s band Then Jerico
- Rose Smith (1891–1985), communist activist and union official
- Phil "Philthy Animal" Taylor (1954–2015), Motörhead drummer
- Percy Toplis (1896–1920), criminal, active in the 1910s
- Eric Varley (1932–2008), Labour MP for Chesterfield, cabinet minister, and Chairman of Coalite
- Mike Watterson (1942–2019), professional snooker player and television commentator
- Mark Webber (born 1970), rock guitarist in the band Pulp and curator of avant-garde cinema
- Bob Wilson (born 1941), international footballer and broadcaster
- Luke Wordsworth (died 1643), Royalist cavalry soldier in the English Civil War who served under Prince Rupert of the Rhine and was killed by Roundhead forces the Battle of Aylesbury
- Peter Wright (1916–1995), MI5 officer and author of Spycatcher

=== Sport ===
- Ben Barnicoat (born 1996), racing driver
- Tommy Briggs (1923–1984), professional footballer and football manager
- Millie Bright (born 1993), England footballer
- Fred Davis (1913–1998), snooker player
- Richard Dawson (1960–2020), professional footballer with Rotherham United, Doncaster Rovers and Chesterfield
- Connor Dimaio (born 1996), professional footballer
- Thomas Gascoyne (1876–1917), professional cyclist professional cyclist, who set world records for both 25 miles and the flying start quarter-mile. He rode in Europe, America and Australia but died at the Battle of Passchendaele
- Diego De Girolamo (born 1995), professional footballer
- Graham Harbey, (Born 1964), is an English former professional footballer who played in the Football League for Derby County, Ipswich Town, Stoke City and West Bromwich Albion.
- Nigel Illingworth (born 1960), first-class cricketer
- Thomas Latimer (born 1986), WWE wrestler under the stage name Kenneth Cameron
- Matthew Lowton (born 1989), professional footballer
- John Lukic (born 1960), professional footballer
- Geoff Miller (born 1952), England cricketer
- Ernest Moss (1949–2021), was an English footballer
- Liam Pitchford (born 1993), British Olympic table tennis player and 2x Commonwealth Games gold medallist
- Joe Screen (born 1972), international speedway rider

Other prominent connections

- Gordon Banks (1937–2019), England's World Cup winning goalkeeper played for Chesterfield between 1955 and 1959
- Tony Benn (1925–2014), Labour MP for Chesterfield from 1984 to 2001
- Sir Montague Burton (1885–1952), founder of the Burton chain, which opened his first store in Chesterfield in 1903
- Geoff Capes (born 1949), twice winner of the World's Strongest Man competition, used to live in Chesterfield
- Edmond Francis Crosse (1858–1941), Vicar of Chesterfield and then first Archdeacon of Chesterfield
- Erasmus Darwin, (1731–1802), one of the founders of the Lunar Society, a discussion group of pioneering industrialists and natural philosophers, was educated at Chesterfield School.
- John Lowe (born 1945), former professional darts player, three-time darts World Champion, lives locally
- Harry Maguire (born 1993), English football player, went to school in Chesterfield
- Alfred Seaman (1844–1910), Victorian photographer, opened his first studio in the town
- Ben Slater (born 1991), professional cricketer for Derbyshire, then Nottinghamshire
- George Stephenson (1781–1848), engineer behind the world's first public railway hauled by steam, ended his days at Tapton House, now a Chesterfield College campus, his statue can be seen outside Chesterfield station

== Twinnings ==
Chesterfield is twinned with:

- Darmstadt, Germany
- Troyes, France
- Yangquan, Shanxi province, China
- Tsumeb, Namibia

== Arms ==
Coat of arms of Chesterfield, Derbyshire

Notes
Granted 10 November 1955
Crest
On a wreath of the colours issuant from a mural crown Gules masoned Or a mount Vert thereon a Derby ram passant guardant Proper.
Escutcheon
Gules a device representing a pomegranate tree as depicted on the ancient common seal of the borough the tree leaved and eradicated Proper flowered and fructed Or.
Supporters
On the dexter side a cock and on the sinister side a pynot or magpie Proper each ducally crowned Or.
Motto
Aspire

== See also ==
- Listed buildings in Chesterfield, Derbyshire
- Chesterfield Canal Trust
- Walton Hall
- Chesterfield power station
