= Ted Gilberthorpe =

English footballer

Personal information
- Full name: Alfred Edward Gilberthorpe
- Date of birth: 11 December 1885
- Place of birth: Bolsover, England
- Date of death: 1960 (aged 74–75)
- Position: Inside forward

Senior career*
Years	Team	Apps	(Gls)
1905–1908	Chesterfield Town	49	(8)
1908–1909	Hull City	18	(4)
1909	Bolsover Colliery		
Total		67	(12)
- * Club domestic league appearances and goals

Alfred Edward Gilberthorpe (11 December 1885 – 1960) was an English footballer who played in the Football League for Chesterfield Town and Hull City.
