= Boythorpe =

Suburb of Chesterfield, Derbyshire, England

Coordinates: 53.228°N 1.437°W

- Location within Derbyshire
- OS grid reference: SK376702
- District: Chesterfield
- Shire county: Derbyshire
- Region: East Midlands
- Country: England
- Sovereign state: United Kingdom
- Post town: CHESTERFIELD
- Postcode district: S40
- Dialling code: 01246
- Police: Derbyshire
- Fire: Derbyshire
- Ambulance: East Midlands

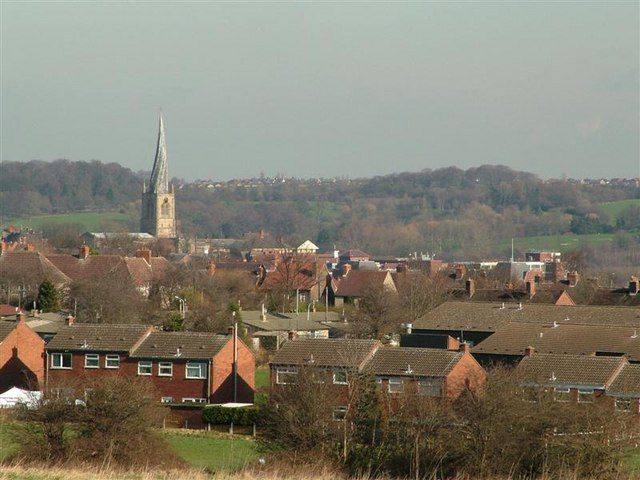
Boythorpe Rooftops with Parish Church in distance.

Boythorpe is a small suburb to the south-west of Chesterfield town centre in Derbyshire, England. It also borders Birdholme to its east, and Walton to its west. The area mainly consists of social housing, although Chesterfield's cricket ground is within the largest park, Queen's Park, which is located in Boythorpe on the edge of the town centre. Boythorpe has a large secondary school, Parkside Community School, which serves students aged 11–16, located on the district's main thoroughfare, Hunloke Avenue.
