= List of schools in Derbyshire =

This is a list of schools in Derbyshire, England.

== State-funded schools ==
=== Primary schools ===
- Abercrombie Primary School, Chesterfield
- Aldercar Infant School, Aldercar
- All Saints' CE Infants School, Matlock
- All Saints' CE Junior School, Matlock
- All Saints RC Voluntary Academy, Old Glossop
- Ambergate Primary School, Ambergate
- Anthony Bek Community Primary School, Pleasley
- Arkwright Primary School, Arkwright Town
- Ashbourne Hilltop Primary School, Ashbourne
- Ashbourne Primary School, Ashbourne
- Ashbrook Infant School, Borrowash
- Ashbrook Junior School, Borrowash
- Ashover Primary School, Ashover
- Aston-on-Trent Primary School, Aston-on-Trent
- Bakewell CE Infant School, Bakewell
- Bakewell Methodist Junior School, Bakewell
- Bamford Primary School, Bamford
- Barlborough Primary School, Barlborough
- Barlow CE Primary School, Barlow
- Barrow Hill Primary Academy, Barrow Hill
- Belmont Primary School, Swadlincote
- Biggin CE Primary School, Biggin
- Birk Hill Infant School, Eckington
- Bishop Pursglove CE Primary School, Buxton
- Blackwell Community Primary School, Blackwell
- Bolsover CE Junior School, Bolsover
- Bolsover Infant School, Bolsover
- Bonsall CE Primary School, Bonsall
- Bradley CE Primary School, Bradley
- Bradwell CE Infant School, Bradwell
- Bradwell Junior School, Bradwell
- Brailsford CE Primary School, Brailsford
- Bramley Vale Primary School, Bramley Vale
- Brampton Primary School, Brampton
- Brassington Primary School, Brassington
- Breadsall CE Primary School, Breadsall
- The Brigg Infant School, South Normanton
- Brimington Junior School, Brimington
- Brimington Manor Infant School, Brimington
- Brockley Primary School, Shuttlewood
- Brockwell Junior School, Loundsley Green
- Brockwell Nursery School, Loundsley Green
- Brookfield Primary School, Langwith Junction
- Brooklands Primary School, Long Eaton
- Burbage Primary School, Burbage
- Buxton Infant School, Buxton
- Buxton Junior School, Buxton
- Buxworth Primary School, Buxworth
- Calow CE Primary School, Calow
- Camms CE Primary School, Eckington
- Carsington and Hopton Primary School, Carsington
- Castle View Primary School, Matlock
- Castleton CE Primary School, Castleton
- Cavendish Junior School, Newbold Moor
- Chapel-en-le-Frith CE Primary School, Chapel-en-le-Frith
- Charlesworth Primary School, Charlesworth
- Charlotte Infant School, Ilkeston
- Chaucer Infant School, Ilkeston
- Chaucer Junior School, Ilkeston
- Chellaston Fields Spencer Academy, Chellaston
- Chinley Primary School, Chinley
- Christ Church CE Primary School, Stonegravels
- Christ the King RC Academy, Alfreton
- Church Broughton CE Primary School, Church Broughton
- Church Gresley Infant School, Church Gresley
- Clifton CE Primary School, Clifton
- Clover Leys Spencer Academy, Chellaston
- Cloudside Academy, Sandiacre
- Clowne Infant School, Clowne
- Clowne Junior School, Clowne
- Codnor Community CE Primary School, Codnor
- Combs Infant School, Chapel-en-le-Frith
- Coppice Primary School, Marlpool
- Copthorne Community Infant School, Alfreton
- Corfield CE Infant School, Heanor
- Cotmanhay Infant School, Cotmanhay
- Cotmanhay Junior School, Cotmanhay
- Coton-in-the-Elms CE Primary School, Coton-in-the-Elms
- Creswell CE Infant School, Creswell
- Creswell Junior School, Creswell
- Crich Carr CE Primary School, Whatstandwell
- Crich CE Infant School, Crich
- Crich Junior School, Crich
- Croft Infant School, Alfreton
- Cromford CE Primary School, Cromford
- Curbar Primary School, Calver
- The Curzon CE Primary School, Quarndon
- Cutthorpe Primary School, Cutthorpe
- Dallimore Primary School, Kirk Hallam
- Darley Churchtown CE Primary School, Darley Dale
- Darley Dale Primary School, Hackney
- Deer Park Primary School, Wingerworth
- Denby Free CE Primary School, Denby
- Dinting CE Primary School, Dinting Vale
- Dove Holes CE Primary School, Dove Holes
- Dovedale Primary School, Long Eaton
- Doveridge Primary School, Doveridge
- Draycott Community Primary School, Draycott
- Dronfield Infant School, Dronfield
- Dronfield Junior School, Dronfield
- Dronfield Stonelow Junior School, Dronfield
- Duckmanton Primary School, Duckmanton
- Duffield the Meadows Primary School, Duffield
- Duke of Norfolk CE Primary School, Glossop
- Dunston Primary Academy, Newbold
- Earl Sterndale CE Primary School, Earl Sterndale
- Eckington Junior School, Eckington
- Edale CE Primary School, Edale
- Egginton Primary School, Egginton
- Elmsleigh Infant School, Swadlincote
- Elton CE Primary School, Elton
- English Martyrs' RC Academy, Long Eaton
- Etwall Primary School, Etwall
- Eureka Primary School, Midway
- Eyam CE Primary School, Eyam
- Fairfield CE Junior School, Fairfield
- Fairfield Infant School, Fairfield
- Fairmeadows Foundation Primary School, Newhall
- Field House Infant School, Ilkeston
- Findern Primary School, Findern
- Firfield Primary School, Breaston
- Fitzherbert CE Primary School, Fenny Bentley
- Fritchley CE Primary School, Fritchley
- Furness Vale Primary School, Furness Vale
- Gamesley Primary School, Gamesley
- Gilbert Heathcote Infant School, Whittington Moor
- Glebe Junior School, South Normanton
- Gorseybrigg Primary School, Dronfield Woodhouse
- Granby Junior School, Ilkeston
- Grange Primary School, Ilkeston
- Grassmoor Primary School, Grassmoor
- Great Hucklow CE Primary School, Great Hucklow
- The Green Infant School, South Normanton
- Grindleford Primary School, Grindleford
- Hadfield Infant School, Hadfield
- Hady Primary School, Hady
- Hague Bar Primary School, Hague Bar
- Hallam Fields Junior School, Ilkeston
- Harpur Hill Primary School, Harpur Hill
- Harrington Junior School, Long Eaton
- Hartington CE Primary School, Hartington
- Hartshorne CE Primary School, Hartshorne
- Hasland Infant School, Hasland
- Hasland Junior School, Hasland
- Hathersage St Michael's CE Primary School, Hathersage
- Hayfield Primary School, Hayfield
- Heage Primary School, Heage
- Heath Fields Primary School, Hatton
- Heath Primary School, Heath
- Henry Bradley Infant School, Brimington
- Herbert Strutt Primary School, Belper
- Highfield Hall Primary School, Chesterfield
- Highfields Spencer Academy, Highfield
- Hilton Primary School, Hilton
- Hodthorpe Primary School, Hodthorpe
- Holbrook CE Primary School, Holbrook
- Hollingwood Primary School, Hollingwood
- Holme Hall Primary School, Chesterfield
- Holmesdale Infant School, Dronfield
- Holmgate Primary School, Clay Cross
- Hope Primary School, Hope
- Horsley CE Primary School, Horsley
- Horsley Woodhouse Primary School, Horsley Woodhouse
- Howitt Primary Community School, Heanor
- Hulland CE Primary School, Hulland
- Hunloke Park Primary School, Wingerworth
- Immaculate Conception RC Primary, Spinkhill
- Inkersall Primary Academy, Inkersall
- Ironville and Codnor Primary School, Ironville
- John King Infant Academy, Pinxton
- Kensington Junior School, Ilkeston
- Kilburn Infant School, Kilburn
- Kilburn Junior School, Kilburn
- Killamarsh Infant School, Killamarsh
- Killamarsh Junior School, Killamarsh
- Kirk Ireton CE Primary School, Kirk Ireton
- Kirk Langley CE Primary School, Kirk Langley
- Kirkstead Junior Academy, Pinxton
- Kniveton CE Primary School, Kniveton
- Laceyfields Academy, Langley
- Ladycross Infant School, Sandiacre
- Ladywood Primary School, Kirk Hallam
- Langley Mill Academy, Langley Mill
- Langley Mill CE Infant School, Langley Mill
- Langwith Bassett Junior Academy, Upper Langwith
- Larklands Infant School, Ilkeston
- Lea Primary School, Lea
- Lenthall Infant School, Dronfield
- Leys Junior School, Alfreton
- Linton Primary School, Linton
- Little Eaton Primary School, Little Eaton
- Litton CE Primary School, Litton
- Long Lane CE Primary School, Dalbury Lees
- Long Row Primary School, Belper
- Longford CE Primary School, Longford
- Longmoor Primary School, Long Eaton
- Longstone CE Primary School, Great Longstone
- Longwood Infant Academy, Pinxton
- Lons Infant School, Ripley
- Loscoe CE Primary School, Loscoe
- Mapperley CE Primary School, Mapperley
- Marlpool Infant School, Marlpool
- Marlpool Junior School, Marlpool
- Marsh Lane Primary School, Marsh Lane
- Marston Montgomery Primary School, Marston Montgomery
- Mary Swanwick Primary School, Old Whittington
- Matlock Bath Holy Trinity CE Primary School, Matlock Bath
- The Mease Spencer Academy, Hilton
- Melbourne Infant School, Melbourne
- Melbourne Junior School, Melbourne
- Mickley Infant School, Stretton
- Middleton Community Primary School, Middleton-by-Wirksworth
- Milford Primary School, Milford
- Model Village Primary School, Shirebrook
- Monyash CofE Primary School, Monyash
- Morley Primary School, Morley
- Morton Primary Academy, Morton
- Mugginton CE Primary School, Mugginton
- Mundy CE Junior School, Heanor
- Netherseal St Peter's CE Primary School, Netherseal
- New Bolsover Primary School, Bolsover
- New Mills Primary School, New Mills
- New Whittington Community Primary School, New Whittington
- Newbold CE Primary School, Newbold
- Newhall Community Junior School, Newhall
- Newhall Infant School, Newhall
- Newton Primary School, Newton
- Newton Solney CE Infant School, Newton Solney
- Newtown Primary School, New Mills
- Norbriggs Primary School, Mastin Moor
- Norbury CE Primary School, Norbury
- North Wingfield Primary Academy, North Wingfield
- Northfield Junior School, Dronfield
- Old Hall Junior School, Chesterfield
- Osmaston CE Primary School, Osmaston
- Overseal Primary School, Overseal
- Padfield Community Primary School, Padfield
- Palterton Primary School, Palterton
- Park House Primary School, Lower Pilsley
- The Park Infant School, Shirebrook
- The Park Junior School, Shirebrook
- Parklands Infant School, Long Eaton
- Parwich Primary School, Parwich
- Peak Dale Primary School, Peak Dale
- Peak Forest CE Primary School, Peak Forest
- Pennine Way Junior Academy, Swadlincote
- Penny Acres Primary School, Holmesfield
- Pilsley CE Primary School, Pilsley Village
- Pilsley Primary School, Pilsley
- Poolsbrook Primary Academy, Poolsbrook
- Pottery Primary School, Belper
- Redhill Primary School, Ockbrook
- Renishaw Primary School, Renishaw
- Repton Primary School, Repton
- Richardson Endowed Primary School, Smalley
- Riddings Infant School, Riddings
- Riddings Junior School, Riddings
- Ridgeway Primary School, Ridgeway
- Ripley Infant School, Ripley
- Ripley Junior School, Ripley
- Risley Lower Grammar CE Primary School, Risley
- Rosliston CE Primary School, Rosliston
- Rowsley CE Primary School, Rowsley
- St Andrew's CE Junior School, Hadfield
- St Andrew's CE Methodist Primary School, Dronfield Woodhouse
- St Andrew's CE Primary School, Stanley
- St Anne's CE Primary School, Baslow
- St Anne's RC Academy, Buxton
- St Charles' RC Primary Academy, Hadfield
- St Edward's RC Academy, Swadlincote
- St Elizabeth's RC Academy, Belper
- St George's CE Primary School, Church Gresley
- St George's CE Primary School, New Mills
- St Giles CE Primary School, Killamarsh
- St Giles CE Primary School, Matlock
- St John's CE Primary School, Belper
- St John's CE Primary School, Ripley
- St Joseph's RC Academy, Matlock
- St Joseph's RC and CE Primary School, Staveley
- St Joseph's RC Primary School, Langwith Junction
- St Laurence CE Primary School, Long Eaton
- St Luke's CE Primary School, Glossop
- St Margaret's RC Academy, Glossop
- St Mary's RC Academy, Glossop
- St Mary's RC Academy, New Mills
- St Mary's RC Primary School, Chesterfield
- St Oswald's CE Primary School, Ashbourne
- St Thomas RC Academy, Ilkeston
- Sale and Davys CE Primary School, Barrow upon Trent
- Sawley Infant School, Sawley
- Sawley Junior School, Sawley
- Scarcliffe Primary School, Scarcliffe
- Scargill CE Primary School, West Hallam
- Shardlow Primary School, Shardlow
- Sharley Park Primary School, Danesmoor
- Shirland Primary School, Shirland
- Simmondley Primary School, Simmondley
- Somercotes Infant School, Somercotes
- Somerlea Park Junior School, Somercotes
- South Darley CE Primary School, South Darley
- South Wingfield Primary School, South Wingfield
- Speedwell Infant School, Staveley
- Spire Junior School, Chesterfield
- Spire Infant School, Chesterfield
- Springfield Junior School, Swadlincote
- Stanley Common CE Primary School, Stanley Common
- Stanton Primary School, Stanton
- Stanton-in-Peak CE Primary School, Stanton-in-Peak
- Staveley Junior School, Staveley
- Stenson Fields Primary Community School, Stenson Fields
- Stonebroom Primary School, Stonebroom
- Stoney Middleton CE Primary School, Stoney Middleton
- Street Lane Primary School, Denby
- Stretton Handley CE Primary School, Woolley Moor
- Sudbury Primary School, Sudbury
- Swanwick Primary School, Swanwick
- Taddington and Priestcliffe School, Taddington
- Tansley Primary School, Tansley
- Taxal and Fernilee CE Primary School, Whaley Bridge
- Temple Normanton Junior Academy, Temple Normanton
- Thornsett Primary School, Birch Vale
- Three Trees CE Junior Academy, Woodville
- Three Trees Infant Academy, Woodville
- Tibshelf Infant School, Tibshelf
- Tintwistle CE Primary School, Tintwistle
- Town End Junior School, Tibshelf
- Tupton Primary Academy, New Tupton
- Turnditch CE Primary School, Turnditch
- Unstone Junior School, Unstone
- Unstone St Mary's Infant School, Unstone
- Waingroves Primary School, Ripley
- Walton Holymoorside Primary School, Holymoorside
- Walton On Trent CE Primary School, Walton-on-Trent
- Walton Peak Primary School, Chesterfield
- Wessington Primary School, Wessington
- Westfield Infant School, Brampton
- Westhouses Primary School, Westhouses
- Weston-on-Trent CE Primary School, Weston-on-Trent
- Whaley Bridge Primary School, Whaley Bridge
- Whaley Thorns Primary School, Langwith
- Whitfield St James' CE Primary School, Glossop
- Whitwell Primary School, Whitwell
- Wigley Primary School, Wigley
- William Gilbert Endowed CE Primary School, Duffield
- William Levick Primary School, Dronfield Woodhouse
- William Rhodes Primary School, Boythorpe
- Willington Primary School, Willington
- Winster CE Primary School, Winster
- Wirksworth CE Infant School, Wirksworth
- Wirksworth Junior School, Wirksworth
- Woodbridge Junior School, Alfreton
- Woodthorpe CE Primary School, Woodthorpe
- Youlgrave All Saints' CE Primary School, Youlgrave

=== Secondary schools ===
- Aldercar High School, Aldercar
- Anthony Gell School, Wirksworth
- Belper School, Belper
- The Bolsover School, Bolsover
- Brookfield Community School, Chesterfield
- Buxton Community School, Buxton
- Chapel-en-le-Frith High School, Chapel-en-le-Frith
- David Nieper Academy, Amber Valley
- Dronfield Henry Fanshawe School, Dronfield
- The Ecclesbourne School, Belper
- Eckington School, Eckington
- Frederick Gent School, South Normanton
- Friesland School, Sandiacre
- Glossopdale School, Hadfield
- Granville Academy, Swadlincote
- Heanor Gate Science College, Heanor
- Heritage High School, Clowne
- Highfields School, Matlock
- Hope Valley College, Hope Valley
- John Flamsteed Community School, Derby
- John Port Spencer Academy, Etwall
- Kirk Hallam Community Academy, Ilkeston
- Lady Manners School, Bakewell
- The Long Eaton School, Long Eaton
- Netherthorpe School, Staveley
- New Mills School, New Mills
- Ormiston Ilkeston Enterprise Academy, Ilkeston
- Outwood Academy Hasland Hall, Chesterfield
- Outwood Academy Newbold, Newbold
- Parkside Community School, Chesterfield
- The Pingle Academy, Swadlincote
- Queen Elizabeth's Grammar School, Ashbourne
- The Ripley Academy, Ripley
- St John Houghton Catholic Voluntary Academy, Kirk Hallam
- St Mary's Roman Catholic High School, Chesterfield
- St Philip Howard Catholic Voluntary Academy, Glossop
- St Thomas More Catholic School, Buxton
- Shirebrook Academy, Shirebrook
- Springwell Community College, Staveley
- Swanwick Hall School, Alfreton
- Tibshelf Community School, Tibshelf
- Tupton Hall School, Chesterfield
- Whittington Green School, Old Whittington
- William Allitt Academy, Swadlincote
- Wilsthorpe School, Long Eaton

=== Special and alternative schools ===
- Alfreton Park Community Special School, Alfreton
- Ashgate Croft School, Chesterfield
- Bennerley Fields School, Cotmanhay
- Brackenfield Special School, Long Eaton
- Holbrook School for Autism, Holbrook
- Holly House Special School, Old Whittington
- North East Derbyshire Support Centre, Hasland
- Peak School, Cauldwell
- South Derbyshire Support Centre, Newhall
- Stanton Vale School, Long Eaton
- Stubbin Wood School, Shirebrook
- Swanwick School and Sports College, Swanwick

=== Further education ===
- Buxton & Leek College, Buxton
- Chesterfield College, Chesterfield
- Derby College, Ilkeston / Morley

== Independent schools ==
=== Primary and preparatory schools ===
- Barlborough Hall School, Barlborough
- Dame Catherine Harpur's School, Ticknall
- Repton Prep, Foremark
- St Peter and St Paul School, Chesterfield
- St Wystan's School, Repton
- Watchorn Christian School, Alfreton

=== Senior and all-through schools ===
- Abbotsholme School, Thurvaston
- Mount St Mary's College, Spinkhill
- OneSchool Global UK, Long Eaton
- Repton School, Repton
- St Anselm's School, Bakewell
- Trent College, Long Eaton

=== Special and alternative schools ===
- Alderwasley Hall School, Alderwasley
- Arnfield Independent School, Tintwistle
- Bladon House School, Newton Solney
- Bradshaw Farm Independent School, Quarnford
- Eastwood Grange School, Ashover
- Ellern Mede Derby School, Breaston
- High Grange School, Burnaston
- Jasmine House School, Heanor
- Longdon Park School, Egginton
- The Meadows, Dove Holes
- New Direction, Clowne
- Old Sams Farm Independent School, Quarnford
- Pegasus School, Cauldwell
- REAL Independent Schools, Ilkeston
- Welden School, Aston-on-Trent
