= Springwell Community College =

Location
- Middlecroft Road; Staveley, Derbyshire, S43 3NQ; England
- Coordinates: 53.2555°N 1.3623°W

Information
- Type: Academy
- Local authority: Derbyshire
- Trust: Two Counties Trust
- Department for Education URN: 147400 Tables
- Ofsted: Reports
- Headteacher: Ian Wingfield
- Gender: Coeducational
- Age: 11 to 16
- Website: http://www.Springwell.ttct.co.uk

Springwell Community College (formerly Springwell Community School) is a coeducational secondary school located in Staveley, Derbyshire, England.

It is a comprehensive school taking pupils from Staveley, Inkersall, Brimington, Hollingwood, Barrow Hill, and other primary schools in the Staveley-Brimington area.

== History ==
Springwell Community School was formed in 1991 by the amalgamation of two secondary schools, Westwood (which was located in nearby Brimington and Hollingwood) and Middlecroft following a reorganisation of education in Chesterfield. The school was formerly housed in the old Middlecroft School 1960's building. It achieved Specialist Status as an Arts College in September 2005. In November 2010 the school relocated to new buildings as part of the Building Schools for the Future programme. The school was renamed Springwell Community College at this time.

In 2014 the school joined a consortium with The Bolsover School, Heritage High School and Shirebrook Academy to form 'Aspire Sixth Form', a sixth form provision that operated across all the school sites. However Aspire Sixth Form closed in 2016 due to low pupil numbers.

Previously a community school administered by Derbyshire County Council, in March 2020 Springwell Community College converted to academy status. The school is now sponsored by the Two Counties Trust.
