= Meadows School =

Meadows School may refer to:

- The Meadows School, Las Vegas
- The Meadows Elementary School (DeSoto, Texas)
- The Meadows School of the Arts at Southern Methodist University, Texas
- The Meadows Community School, former name of Whittington Green School in Old Whittington, Derbyshire, England
