= Barrow Hill and New Whittington =

Ward in the borough of Chesterfield, Derbyshire

Coordinates: 53.275°N 1.40°W

Barrow Hill and New Whittington is one of the nineteen wards that make up the borough of Chesterfield, Derbyshire. The population of the ward was 5,541 at the 2021 Census.

Barrow Hill is a small semi-rural residential area situated approximately four miles from Chesterfield Town Centre.

Whittington is split into two villages - Old and New; Old Whittington is a separate ward.

== Ward elections ==
The ward currently elects three councillors, who sit on the borough council.

Results of the local elections, 3 May 2007.

Councillor	Party	Number of votes
John David Bradbury	Liberal Democrat	946
David Stone	Liberal Democrat	1136
Paul Christopher Stone	Liberal Democrat	1008

Results of the local elections, 1 May 2003.

Councillor	Party	Number of votes
John David Bradbury	Liberal Democrat	967
David Stone	Liberal Democrat	1402
Paul Christopher Stone	Liberal Democrat	1123
