= Thomas Gascoyne =

Australian racing cyclist

Tom Gascoyne
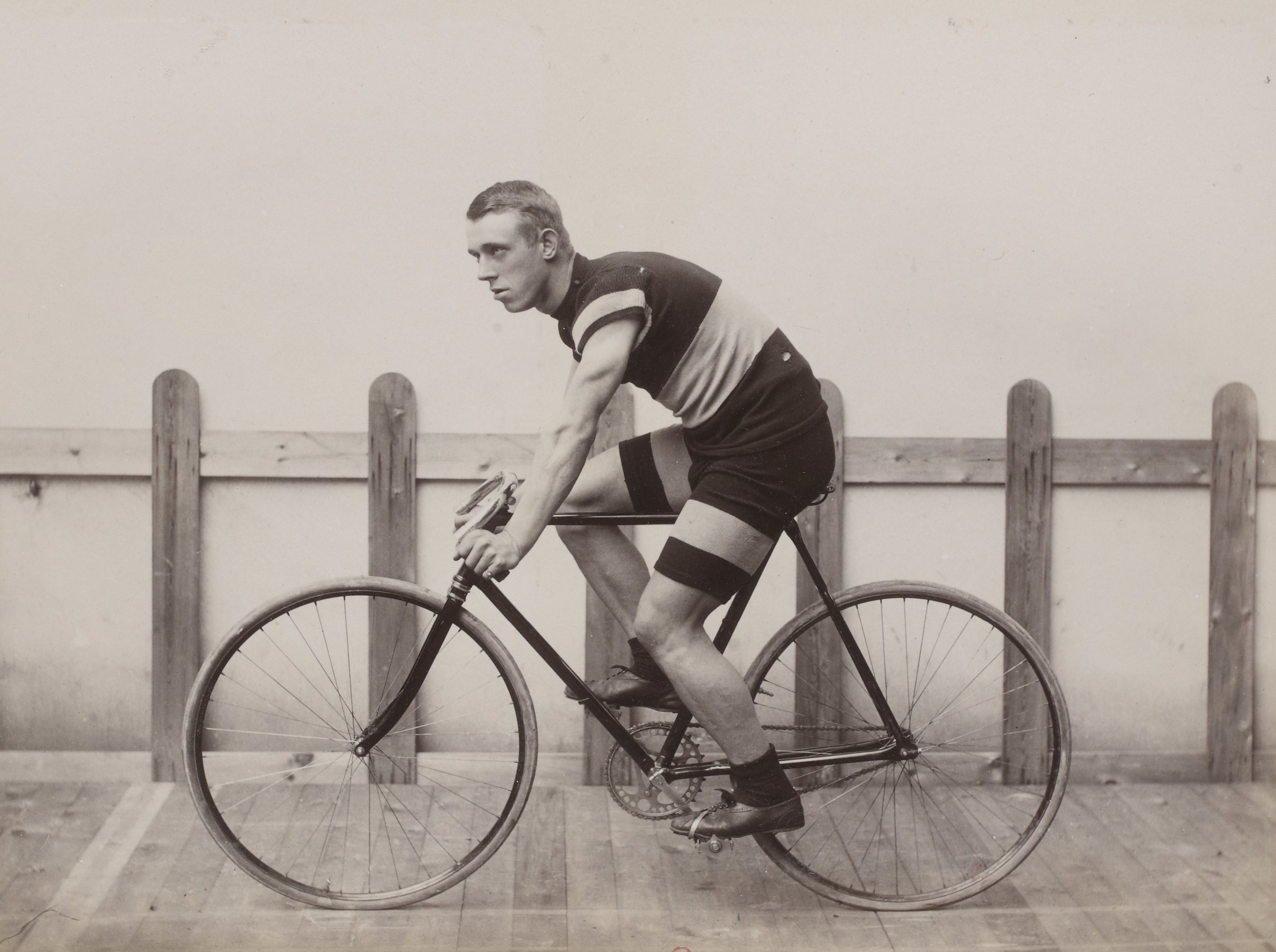
- Thomas Gascoyne between 1897 and 1898.

Personal information
- Full name: Thomas Jepson Gascoyne
- Nicknames: T. Jeb Gascoyne; Mills – pseudonym he adopted in Australia
- Born: 18 August 1876 Whittington, Chesterfield, Derbyshire, England
- Died: 4 October 1917 (aged 41) Broodseinde, Passchendaele salient, Belgium

Cycling career
- Sport: Cycling
- Disciplines: Track, solo and tandem
- Role: Rider, Pursuit

Amateur team
- 1893-: Chesterfield Cycling Club

Professional team
- 189x-1909+: -

Major wins
- World record for 25 miles World record for unpaced flying start quarter-mile English record for two miles on a tandem Unpaced mile in 2 minutes 5 seconds

Thomas Jepson Gascoyne (or Thomas Jefferson Gascoyne, T. Jeb Gascoyne or Mills) (17 August 1876 – 4 October 1917) was an English professional cycling champion and world record holder who competed internationally on both bicycles and tandems.

He held world records for both 25 miles and the flying start quarter-mile. He held the English record for two miles on a tandem, and recorded an unpaced mile in 2 minutes 5 seconds.

According to the Otago Witness of 1907:

... it is questionable whether any rider, Fenn or MacFarland included, ever came up to the wonderful powers shown by Gascoyne.

... He is a living exception of the proved rule in cycle racing that he who paces must be left at the finish.

... From 1896 to 1901 he raced in various parts of the world, and his marvellous unpaced efforts never failed to send the crowds wild with excitement.

In the early 1900s he emigrated to Australia and did manual work before returning to cycle racing. He eventually settled in Preston, Victoria. He served in the Australian Army and died at the Battle of Passchendaele in World War I.

== Personal life ==
Thomas Jepson Gascoyne was born in Whittington, Chesterfield to Richard and Susan Gascoyne. He was married to Linda. In the early 1900s he emigrated to Australia and by 1907 was living in Newcastle, New South Wales, by which time reports indicate that 'he had been working in various jobs and locations for several years'. At the outbreak of World War I he was resident at 3 Adeline Street, Preston, a suburb of Melbourne, Victoria, when he enlisted in the Australian 21st Battalion.

== Cycling career ==
=== England and Europe ===
Gascoyne began his cycling career in 1893. In 1896 he set the world record for 25 miles in 57 minutes 18.4 seconds. This was his first attempt at a distance greater than 10 miles on a cinder track and he easily broke the 59 mins 1.6 secs record set by Schaeffer. The riders had been paced by a triplet but he reportedly overtook it because it was not fast enough.

In 1901, in partnership with Sidney Jenkins, he set the English record time for two miles on a tandem and in the same year at the Crystal Palace track he completed an unpaced mile in 2 minutes 5 seconds.

Gascoyne held the world record for an unpaced flying start quarter-mile with a time of 25 seconds.

=== America ===
Gascoyne's international reputation was such that his prospective arrival in New York on the SS Kaiserin Maria Theresia, accompanied by tandem partner Sydney Jenkins, was considered newsworthy by the New York Times of 5 June 1901. It went on to describe him as 'Thomas Jefferson Gascoyne' when it was promoting cycling events. Three days later he competed in the tandem races at Madison Square Garden with his partner Sydney Jenkins. The New York Times reported in June 1901 that:

...[he] has followed the racing path since 1893. At unpaced work Gascoyne possesses more than normal speed, and has the exceptional honour of never having been beaten in a pursuit race.

At the Boston cycle-track on Saturday 20 July 1901 he beat Major Taylor twice. The following day at the Vailsburg, Newark (New Jersey) cycle track he beat John Bedell in the half-mile handicap for professionals but was then scheduled, without recovery time, to immediately contest an 'Australian Pursuit' race against W.S. Fenn from Waterbury, Connecticut. He was defeated after 3 miles, his first ever defeat in a pursuit.

=== Australia ===
The Otago Witness of 1907 reported:

"Jeb" Gascoyne, as he was known on English, European and American tracks less than a decade ago, made a worldwide reputation as an unpaced handicap performer, and it is questionable whether any rider, Fenn or MacFarland included, ever came up to the wonderful powers shown by Gascoyne.

He is a living exception of the proved rule in cycle racing that he who paces must be left at the finish. He possesses a unique characteristic which will not allow him to follow another competitor's wheel in a handicap. He must be in front.

Setting his head in his own peculiar style on one side, partly over the front wheel, with grim determination and speedy pedalling he never fails to bring the field back to him.

From 1896 to 1901 he raced in various parts of the world, and his marvellous unpaced efforts never failed to send the crowds wild with excitement.

In the early 1900s Gascoyne quietly dropped out of European racing and emigrated to Australia with his racing colleague H. Brown, a handicap specialist. They did manual work for several years but when they arrived in Newcastle they started entering cycle races using the pseudonyms of Mills and Atkinson. Despite an initial lack of fitness, Gascoyne's natural speed meant that he was soon relegated to 'scratch' in the handicap races at night carnivals. Eventually rumours spread and the two riders had to reveal their true identities but their integrity remained intact, they had simply retired from racing to concentrate on manual labour careers. As a stoker Gascoyne's breathing had suffered sufficiently for him to lose several early races, but the unmasked 'scratch' Gascoyne gave up stoking and started training for cycling again. He became particularly popular in Sydney, where he won the 1907 Five Mile Scratch Race on Anniversary night, and was a headline name at races.

In 1909 Gascoyne starts with a 3-minute handicap in the Melbourne to Warrnambool Classic, Australia's oldest road race. He achieves the 3rd fastest time behind Iddo Munro and Albert Pianta. In 1911 he also participated in the Melbourne to Warrnambool, this time from scratch, but he only achieved a very modest 71st fastest time.

In December 1911 he finished 11th with his partner Alan Lloyd (E. Lloyd) in the 6 Day Race at Sydney, Australia. The Sydney Morning Herald reported on 10 January 1912 that Gascoyne had been very unlucky to 'lose his mate'.

In December 1912 he declined an invitation to enter the Sydney 6 Day Race with his old partner Sidney Jenkins, because he ...cannot leave Melbourne without forfeiting a good position, which [he was] not disposed to do.

== Death ==
Corporal Thomas Jepson Gascoyne is listed at the Menin Gate Ypres as having died on 4 October 1917 in the Battle of Broodseinde in World War I. The Australian War Memorial - Roll of Honour describes him thus :

- Service number: 4715
- Rank: Corporal
- Unit: 21st Battalion (Infantry)
- Service: Australian Army
- Conflict: 1914–1918
- Date of death: 4 October 1917
- Cemetery or memorial details: Ypres (Menin Gate) Memorial, Belgium
- War Grave Register notes: GASCOYNE, Cpl. Thomas Jepson, 4715. 21st Bn. 4 October 1917. Age 40. Son of Richard and Susan Gascoyne; husband of Linda Gascoyne, of 5, Adeline St., South Preston, Victoria (Although he never lived there). Native of Derbyshire, England.
- Source: AWM145 Roll of Honour cards, 1914–1918 War, Army
