= Stanley Dyson =

British art teacher and artist

- Born: Stanley Dyson; Chesterfield, Derbyshire
- Occupations: Art teacher, petty officer, artist
- Known for: Unknown artist, art master

Stanley Dyson (1920–2007) was an art teacher and Outsider Art artist.

== Early life and education ==
Stanley Dyson was born in Chesterfield, Derbyshire on 24 July 1920, the only child of George and Mary Alice Dyson. Stanley's mother was born Mary Alice Bowler and she died of pneumonia on 13 February 1926, aged 33, when Stanley was 5. It is thought that Stanley then moved to either Holymoorside or Newbold to live on a farm. Stanley's father, George, carried on living at 35 Church Street, Old Whittington, which still stands today. Stanley went to school in Whittington and left at 16 to work as a clerk at the Sheep Bridge Works. As a teenager, just before World War II, Stanley took measurements and followed up on local details of churches and old houses in Derbyshire for Pevsner and his 'Buildings of England' series. Stanley later moved to Norfolk in 1966 when his daughter was two, and after that, he stopped painting.

In 1941 -1946, Stanley joined the navy and became a 'Stores Petty Officer', in charge of 'victualling and messing'. He spent much of his time in Jamaica and was there until 1944. He was released from his duties on 5 August 1946.

After being demobbed, he returned home to live with his father, now in his 70s. The register of electors for 1946/7 confirms that he was living at 35 Church Street with George and Ada Dyson. He did not return to his job as a clerk at the Steel Works. The post-war shortage of teachers and schemes devised to encourage their training would have provided just the sort of opportunity he needed to start his artistic career. In the Autumn of 1949 and the Spring of 1950, Stanley enrolled at the famous art school where John Lennon went at a later date, Liverpool College of Art. This was possible with one of the government-funded grants for ex-servicemen and his excellent service reports would have helped in getting him onto this scheme. It is unknown how formally Stanley had already been teaching before 1950, but in that year, on leaving art school, he returned to Whittington to teach art in the local New Whittington Secondary School and to marry Kathleen Allman, the daughter of a farmer from Holymoorside. He moved out of the Dysons' cottage and they went to live in Holymoorside.

== Art teacher ==
Stanley taught pottery as well as painting and art history in the 1950s at the New Whittington Secondary School, Derbyshire. Any art work he did, he did for himself and he didn't show the end-product to many people, except for some of his sketching friends. He never exhibited anywhere, nor was he a member of any club or other artists' association, even though these flourished in the 1950s. A peculiar and possibly telling technical detail of his own work is that he hardly ever used fresh canvases or prepared boards.

More than 50 very fluent pen and watercolour drawings survive from 1948 to 1949, the majority of them of churches, houses and landscapes around Derbyshire and also in Norfolk. These drawings represent the only dated and inscribed work that he ever produced, as he never signed anything.

Within the portfolio bought by Robert Young Antiques at an auction at Beccles in Suffolk 2007, there are many sheets of drawings, figure studies, and student exercises that were obviously completed while Stanley was at Art School. It also contained a selection of his pupil's art works that he taught at The New Whittington Secondary School and the surviving record of Stanley's enrolment at the school lists his occupation as 'Teacher'.

== Retirement ==
After teaching in Derbyshire for sixteen years, he moved to Coldham Hall, close to Beccles in Norfolk in 1966. He took a job as 'Arts and crafts' master at Bowthorpe Secondary School on the outskirts of Norwich and Mary Dyson also continued to teach, at Bishop Sandcroft's school in Harleston.

Stanley stopped painting after this time and he packed up his own work, approx 400 oils and watercolours, along with what he wanted to keep of the art of his pupils and stored everything, some in his own hand-made sketch books in Coldham Hall's large attic. Once they had settled in Norfolk, he directed most of his energy towards his family and the restoration of their house but Stanley continued to be passionate about art history. They would often go on trips to London museums and galleries and to the Fitzwilliam Museum in Cambridge. A favourite museum was the V&A and he entered into a lively correspondence with the museum curators. Stanley was naturally fastidious, obsessive, a perfectionist. Everything had to be just so, in its rightful place. He particularly liked the works of – Kyffin Williams and John Piper and he was also known for his antiquarian interests, exemplified in the only memorial to Stanley in the Chesterfield Local Studies Library.

== Exhibitions ==
Chesterfield Museum and Art Gallery. A selection of paintings by Stanley Dyson (1920–2007) has been exhibited at The Chesterfield Museum and Art Gallery alongside work from Dyson's former pupils. The exhibition was opened by Councilor Keith Morgan, Mayor of Chesterfield on Monday 7 February at 10 am 2011. The exhibition included topographical and general paintings by Dyson as well as a fine selection of pictures by his students. -
