= Fred Greaves =

English Victoria Cross recipient (1890–1973)

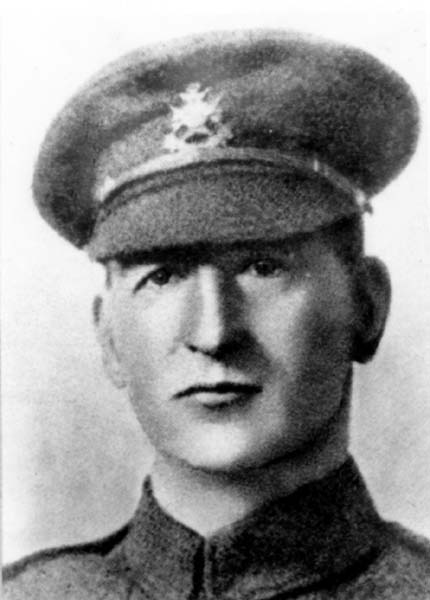
- Born: 16 May 1890; Killamarsh, Derbyshire
- Died: 11 June 1973 (aged 83); Brimington, Derbyshire
- Military career
- Allegiance: United Kingdom
- Branch: British Army
- Rank: Sergeant
- Units: The Sherwood Foresters
- Conflicts: World War I; Battle of Broodseinde
- Awards: Victoria Cross

Fred Greaves VC (16 May 1890 – 11 June 1973) was an English recipient of the Victoria Cross, the highest and most prestigious award for gallantry in the face of the enemy that can be awarded to British and Commonwealth forces.

Greaves was born on 16 May 1890 in Killamarsh, a town in north-east Derbyshire. He was 27 years old, and an acting corporal in the 9th Battalion, The Sherwood Foresters (The Nottinghamshire and Derbyshire Regiment), British Army during the Battle of Broodseinde in the First World War when he performed a deed for which he was awarded the Victoria Cross.

On 4 October 1917 at Poelcapelle, east of Ypres, Belgium, when the platoon was held up by machine-gun fire from a concrete stronghold and the platoon commander and sergeant were casualties, Corporal Greaves, followed by another NCO, rushed forward, reached the rear of the building and bombed the occupants, killing or capturing the garrison and the machine-gun. Later, at a most critical period of the battle, during a heavy counter-attack, all the officers of the company became casualties and Corporal Geaves collected his men, threw out extra posts on the threatened flank and opened up rifle and machine-gun fire to enfilade the advance.

He later achieved the rank of Sergeant. Fred died in Brimington, near Chesterfield, on 11 June 1973, aged 83, and was cremated there.

His Victoria Cross is displayed at the Sherwood Foresters Museum, Nottingham Castle, England.

On 2 August 2014 a commemorative plaque to Greaves was unveiled in the Chesterfield FC Memorial Garden at the Proact Stadium.
