= Jack Ashley (footballer, born 1912) =

English footballer

Personal information
- Full name: John Albert Ashley
- Date of birth: 13 October 1912
- Place of birth: Clowne, England
- Date of death: 1993 (aged 88–89)
- Position: Full back

Senior career*
Years	Team	Apps	(Gls)
1930–1931	Clowne Miners Welfare		
1931–1932	Notts County	0	(0)
1932–1933	Bolsover Colliery		
1933	Shirebrook		
1933–1936	Mansfield Town	69	(0)
1936–1939	Sheffield Wednesday	106	(3)
Total		175	(3)
- * Club domestic league appearances and goals

John Albert Ashley (13 October 1912 – 1992) was an English professional footballer who played in the Football League for Mansfield Town and Sheffield Wednesday.
