= Pierrepont Mundy =

English cricketer and British Army officer

Major-General Pierrepont Mundy
- Born: Pierrepont Henry Mundy; 4 August 1815; Kirk Hallam, Derbyshire, England
- Died: 16 February 1889 (aged 73); Thornbury, Gloucestershire, England
- Cricket career

Cricket information

Domestic team information
- Years: Team
- 1838–1853: Gentlemen of Kent
- FC debut: 20 August 1838 Gents of Kent v MCC
- Last FC: 18 August 1853 Gents of Kent v Gents of England

Career statistics
Competition	First-class
Matches	9
Runs scored	132
Batting average	8.80
100s/50s	0/0
Top score	24
Balls bowled	386
Wickets	9
Bowling average	15.00
5 wickets in innings	0
10 wickets in match	0
Best bowling	3/?
Catches/stumpings	5/–
- Source: CricInfo, 22 June 2019

Pierrepont Henry Mundy (4 August 1815 – 16 February 1889) was a British Army officer and an English first-class cricketer. A career soldier, Mundy served in the Royal Horse Artillery, where he reached the rank of major-general. In addition to his military career, he played first-class cricket for several teams between 1838 and 1853.

== Military career and first-class cricket ==
Mundy was born at Kirk Hallam to the General Godfrey Basil Meynell Mundy and his wife, Sarah Brydges Rodney. He made his debut in first-class cricket for the Gentlemen of Kent against the Marylebone Cricket Club (MCC) at Chislehurst in 1838. He made a further first-class appearance the following year against the MCC, this time playing for the Gentlemen of Sussex. In 1842, he appeared in four first-class matches, playing for the MCC, the North, the Gentlemen, and the Gentlemen of England. In 1845, he played a single first-class match for Manchester against Yorkshire. Having chosen a career as a professional soldier, Mundy enlisted in the Royal Horse Artillery and by November 1847 he held the rank of second captain. He was promoted to the rank of captain in March 1849.

Despite his career in the army, he was still able to play first-class cricket, making two further appearances for the Gentlemen of England in 1851, and the Gentlemen of Kent in 1853. Mundy made a total of nine first-class appearances, scoring 132 runs with a high score of 34, as well as taking 8 wickets at an average of 15.00. Having been promoted to the ranks of major and lieutenant colonel prior to 1858, he was promoted to the rank of brevet colonel in April 1858. He was promoted to the full rank of colonel in July 1864. He ended his military career with the rank of major-general. He was resident in Ireland at Castletownshend, before living at Thornbury, Gloucestershire in his latter years. He was married twice during his life, having two children from his first marriage. His son, Godfrey Mundy, would become an admiral in the Royal Navy. He died at Thornbury in August 1889.
