= Charles Sykes (metallurgist) =

British physicist and metallurgist (1905-1982)

Sir Charles Sykes CBE, FRS (27 February 1905 – 29 January 1982) was a British physicist and metallurgist.

He was born in Clowne, Derbyshire, the only son of Samuel Sykes, the local greengrocer and was educated at the Netherthorpe Grammar School and Sheffield University, where he gained a BSc in physics in 1925. He stayed on there to do a PhD course in physics but after one year accepted an invitation by Metropolitan-Vickers of Manchester to complete an unfinished project on the alloys of zirconium. The results of that study earned him a PhD in metallurgy and a position in the research department of Metropolitan-Vickers.

Based on his work on alloys at Metropolitan-Vickers he was elected a Fellow of the Royal Society in 1943, his application citation referring to his original investigations into the order-disorder transformation in alloys, the use of x-rays for analysis and his developments of X-ray tubes, continuously evacuated valves and diffusion pumps, and his work on production of hard metals.

During the Second World War he carried out work on armour piercing shells at the National Physical Laboratory and headed the Armament Research Laboratory at the Projectile Development Establishment at Fort Halstead, Kent.

In 1944 he was appointed director of the Brown–Firth research department in Sheffield, contributing his large knowledge of special materials and alloys to the development of high temperature gas turbines. In 1951 he was made managing director of Thomas Firth and John Brown Ltd, becoming deputy chairman in 1962 and chairman in 1964. He retired in 1967.

He was elected President of the Institute of Physics in 1952–4, served as Chairman of the Advisory Council on Research and Development for Fuel and Power from 1965 to 1970, and was a freeman of the Company of Cutlers in Hallamshire, a Sheffield magistrate, and pro-chancellor of Sheffield University (1967–71).

He died on 29 January 1982 at his home in Sheffield. He had married Norah, daughter of Joseph Edward Staton of Clowne, with whom he had a son and a daughter.

== Honours and awards ==
- 1955 Honorary DMet degree from Sheffield University.
- 1956 Awarded Bessemer Gold Medal by the Iron and Steel Institute
- 1956 Awarded CBE
- 1964 Knighted
- 1967 Awarded Glazebrook Medal by the Institute of Physics
