= Ross McMillan =

English rugby union footballer

- Born: Peter Ross McMillan; 2 June 1987 (age 39) Chesterfield, England
- Height: 1.85 m (6 ft 1 in)
- Weight: 116 kg (18 st 4 lb)
- School: The Bolsover School
- University: Sheffield Hallam University

Rugby union career
- Position: Hooker
Youth career
- ????: Chesterfield RUFC
Senior career
Years	Team	Apps	(Points)
2005–2006	Nottingham	1	(0)
2006–2009	Gloucester	1	(0)
2007–2009	Moseley	26	(15)
2009–2010	Coventry	28	(0)
2010–2012	Birmingham & Solihull	33	(5)
2012–2015	Northampton Saints	42	(0)
2015–2018	Bristol	50	(70)
2018–2019	Leicester Tigers	5	(0)
- Correct as of 12 August 2018
International career
Years	Team	Apps	(Points)
2006	England Under 19s		

Peter Ross McMillan (born 2 June 1987) is a professional rugby union player. His position is hooker. McMillan has previously played professionally for Nottingham, Gloucester, Moseley, Coventry, Birmingham & Solihull, Northampton, Bristol and Leicester Tigers.

== Career ==
Born in Chesterfield, England McMillan represented England at U19 level whilst with his first professional club Nottingham.

On 2 June 2006 Gloucester announced McMillan's signing on a 2 years contract ahead of competition from other Premiership clubs to sign him from Nottingham. For the 2007–08 season, Ross was dual-registered with Moseley. In a friendly prior to the 2008-09 season, McMillan suffered a ruptured cruciate ligament against Aviron Bayonnais, a season-ending injury.

McMillan signed for Coventry in the summer of 2009.

McMillan joined Northampton Saints midway through the 2011–2012 season from Birmingham & Solihull as a triallist. He was awarded a short-term contract in February 2012, followed by a full contract after his appearance as a substitute in the LV= Cup final. In 2014 McMillan was a replacement as Saints won the European Rugby Challenge Cup.

In January 2015, Ross was signed by Bristol on an 18-month contract.

On 10 August 2018 Leicester Tigers announced the signing of McMillan. On 15 May 2019 he was announced as one of the players to leave Leicester following the end of the 2018-19 Premiership Rugby season.

McMillan was the Assistant Forwards Coach at London Irish. He now coaches the scrum at Exeter Chiefs.
