= Hollingwood Common Canal =

British canal

The Hollingwood Common Canal (alternatively the Hollingwood Common Canal Tunnel or the Hollingwood Common Tunnel) is a disused navigable coal mine adit which terminated at the Chesterfield Canal at Hollingwood, near Staveley, Derbyshire.

== History ==
The Hollingwood Common canal tunnel was 1.75 miles (2.82 km) long, and measured six feet (1.8 m) high, five feet nine inches (1.75 m) with two feet (0.61 m) of water. Its water level was one foot (0.30 m) lower than that of the Chesterfield canal, requiring the trans-shipment of coal at a wharf constructed at the terminus. The water level in the tunnel was maintained lower than the canal by a culvert that ran beneath the canal. The wharf was on the old line of the Chesterfield Canal, prior to the 1892 cut being constructed. The entrance to the tunnel is still visible, though is gated off.

Boats used were loaded underground within the coal mine the tunnel served; these boats were twenty-one feet (6.4 m) long and three feet six inches (1.07 m) wide, and held seven cones or boxes containing twenty to twenty two hundredweight of coal each.

== Remains ==
The wharf where the coal was transhipped was destroyed in the 1890s, when a new route for the Chesterfield Canal was built, passing to the south of Staveley Works. The original route was then filled in. Cinderhill Lock on the old route was replaced by Hollingwood Lock on the new. After the Chesterfield Canal Trust published an article about finding part of the tunnel, it was investigated by the Coal Authority, which is responsible for making sure that remains connected with coal mining are safe. They lowered the water level in the tunnel by 1.3 feet (400 mm) to expose more of the brickwork, and then made it good, before fitting a metal grille across the entrance.

== See also ==
- Canals of the United Kingdom
- History of the British canal system

== Bibliography ==
- Glover, Stephen (1829). The history of the county of Derbyshire, Vol 1. Henry Mozley and Son.
