= Listed buildings in Brimington =

Brimington is a civil parish in the Borough of Chesterfield, Derbyshire, England. The parish contains 14 listed buildings that are recorded in the National Heritage List for England. Of these, one is listed at Grade II*, the middle of the three grades, and the others are at Grade II, the lowest grade. The parish contains the village of Brimington and the surrounding area, and the listed buildings consist of houses and associated structures, a church, part of a school, and a set of war memorial gates.

== Key ==
Grade	Criteria
II*	Particularly important buildings of more than special interest
II	Buildings of national importance and special interest

== Buildings ==
Name and location	Photograph	Date	Notes	Grade
The Manor House; 53.25318°N 1.39340°W	—	17th century	A stone house with quoins, string courses, and a slate roof with coped gables. There are two storeys, a T-shaped plan, a front range of four bays, a rear wing, and cellars. The central doorway has a massive architrave and a keystone. The windows are casements with two lights and mullions in architraves. In the rear wing are two pairs of crucks.	II
Wall and gate piers, The Manor House; 53.25322°N 1.39313°W	—	17th century	The wall at the boundary with the street is in stone. It is ramped up to the gate piers that have cornices, and pedestals for ball finials.	II
15 High Street; 53.25760°N 1.39423°W	—	Early 18th century	A stone house with quoins, and a slate roof with coped gables and kneelers. There are two storeys and two bays. The central doorway has an architrave and the windows are mullioned and transomed with casements.	II
Garden wall, 15 High Street; 53.25779°N 1.39413°W	—	18th century	The wall enclosing the garden has courses of thin stone slabs, and is coped. Its height varies from between about 8 feet (2.4 m) and 4 feet (1.2 m).	II
64 Station Road; 53.25851°N 1.40365°W	—	18th century (probable)	A stone house that was refronted in the 19th century, with quoins, paired eaves brackets, and coped gables, kneelers, and decorative ridge tiles. There are two storeys and three bays. The central doorway has a bracketed hood, and is flanked by canted bay windows with shaped parapets. In the upper floor are top-hung casement windows in architraves.	II
Farm buildings, wall and gate piers, Grove Farmhouse; 53.25625°N 1.39636°W	—	18th century	The former farm buildings are in brick and stone and mostly have pantile roofs. They form ranges round three sides of a courtyard, and in the northeast range is a large arch. At the entrance to the farmyard are rusticated gate piers, and the south drive to the house has three piers with pyramidal caps. The wall is about 7 feet (2.1 m), it is coped, and ramped down to the entrances.	II
Sutton Lodge; 53.25659°N 1.39777°W	—	18th century	The house is in stone at the front and red brick at the rear, with a moulded eaves cornice, a sill band, and a slate roof with coped gables and kneelers. There are two storeys, three bays, and a lower two-storey single-bay extension on the north. The central doorway has an architrave, pilasters, a rectangular fanlight, and a cornice. It is flanked by canted bay windows with cornices, and the upper floor contains sash windows in architraves. The windows in the extension are casements in architraves.	II
24 and 24A High Street; 53.25833°N 1.39355°W	—	1763	A red brick house with a slate roof and coped gables. There are two storeys and an attic, and two bays. In the centre is a doorway with a flat hood on brackets, and the windows are a mix of sashes and casements.	II
Church of St Michael and All Angels; 53.25730°N 1.39442°W		1796	The oldest part of the church is the tower, the body of the church was rebuilt and the tower was heightened in 1846–47, and the chancel was refurbished in 1891. The church is built in gritstone with a slate roof, and consists of a nave with a clerestory, north and south aisles, a south porch, a chancel with a northeast vestry, and a west tower. The tower has three stages, a south clock face, two-light bell openings, and an embattled parapet with corner pinnacles. The east window has three lights.	II
Stables, Tapton Grove; 53.24725°N 1.39893°W	—	1799	The stable block is in stone with a stone slate roof. There are two storeys, a main range and two short wings with hipped roofs. The building contains doorways, casement windows in architraves, and in the west wing is a pitching hole.	II
Grove Farmhouse; 53.25622°N 1.39692°W	—	Late 18th to early 19th century	The former farmhouse is in stone with quoins, an eaves cornice and blocking course, and a slate roof. There are two storeys, and a symmetrical front of three bays. In the centre is a porch with pillars, a flat hood with a cornice and blocking course, and a door with a round-arched fanlight. The windows are sashes with engraved lintels. To the left is a section with an embattled front, and in the northern part is a cruck truss. At the rear is a doorway with a pulvinated frieze and an architrave.	II
Tapton Grove; 53.24755°N 1.40000°W	—	c. 1809	A stone house with an eaves cornice and a hipped stone slate roof. There are two storeys, a front of five bays, and three bays on the sides. The central doorway has Doric columns, a semicircular fanlight, a pediment, and side lights. The windows are sashes.	II*
Centre block, County Junior School; 53.25755°N 1.39763°W	—	1878	The school is in red brick with bands in blue brick, and a slate roof with tile cresting. The front is irregular with, from the left, a gabled bay with flat-arched windows, a tower with a corbelled cornice and blocking course and two lancet windows, a bay with a hipped gable containing a bay window, a wide bay with two Gothic-arched windows, a doorway with an arch, above which is a half-hipped dormer, and at the right end is a gabled bay with large windows.	II
Brimington Memorial Gates; 53.25457°N 1.39355°W	—	1925	The gateway was built as a memorial to the First World War. It consists of a pair of sandstone gate piers flanked by a lower pair. The piers are rusticated, and each has a moulded cornice and a pyramidal cap. Outside the piers are low curved walls with railings ending in similar piers. The central four piers have panels with inscriptions and the names of those lost in the war. The railings and decorative gates are in wrought iron, and the main gates have dated panels.	II
