= Cotmanhay =

Village in Derbyshire, England

Coordinates: 52.98278°N 1.3087°W

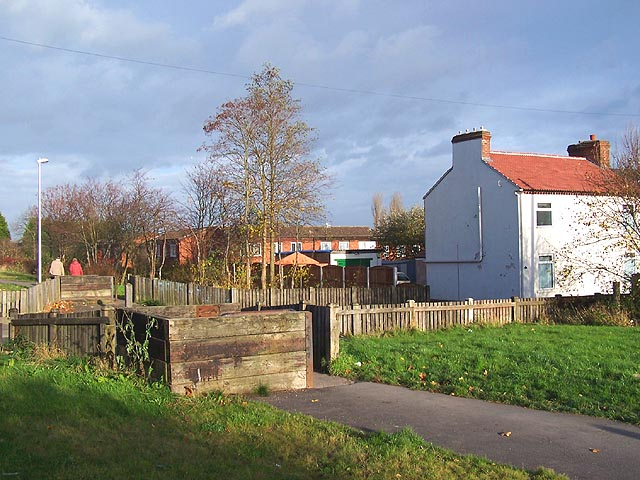
- Cotmanhay linear park

- Location within Derbyshire
- Population: 5,080 (2021)
- District: Erewash
- Shire county: Derbyshire
- Region: East Midlands
- Country: England
- Sovereign state: United Kingdom
- Post town: Ilkeston
- Postcode district: DE7
- Dialling code: 0115
- Police: Derbyshire
- Fire: Derbyshire
- Ambulance: East Midlands
- UK Parliament: Erewash

Cotmanhay is a village and the northernmost area of Ilkeston in Derbyshire, England. Formerly a Viking settlement, Cotmanhay is located in the Erewash Borough Council area and had a population of 5,080 in 2021.

The village's two main industries were textiles and coal mining, the latter from 1848 until 1880. Recently, a flint implement was found at the edge of Cotmanhay Wood, indicating that the area had been inhabited several thousand years ago.

The 2019 Multiple deprivation index found the area around Skeavingtons Lane to be the most deprived area in Derbyshire.

== See also ==
- List of places in Derbyshire
