= Hollingwood =

Village in Derbyshire, England

Coordinates: 53.26°N 1.38°W

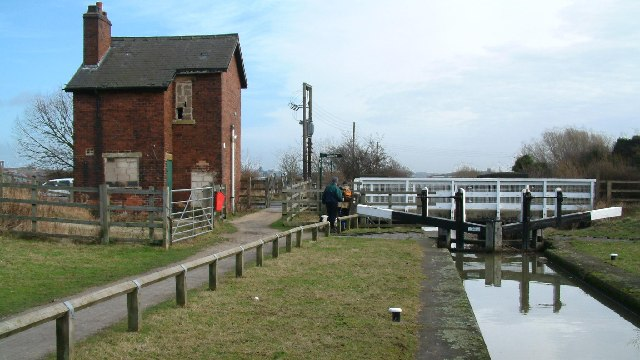
- The nearby lock on the Chesterfield Canal.

- Location within Derbyshire
- OS grid reference: SK406736
- Civil parish: Brimington
- District: Chesterfield
- Shire county: Derbyshire
- Ceremonial county: Derbyshire
- Region: East Midlands
- Country: England
- Sovereign state: United Kingdom
- Post town: CHESTERFIELD
- Postcode district: S43
- Dialling code: 01246
- Police: Derbyshire
- Fire: Derbyshire
- Ambulance: East Midlands
- UK Parliament: Chesterfield

Hollingwood is a small village approximately four miles north east of Chesterfield, Derbyshire, England.

== Description ==
Hollingwood and Barrow Hill were built in c.1900 when the Staveley Coal and Iron Company was formed and built homes there for the workers. It is alleged that Hollingwood was the first village in the country to have hot running water via a ring main from a central boiler house in the village. This boiler house was shut down in the very early 1980s when gas and electric boilers became readily available.

It is surrounded by Brimington (where the population is included), Barrow Hill, and Inkersall. Between Barrow Hill and Hollingwood runs the Chesterfield Canal which is currently being regenerated by the Chesterfield Canal Trust. The canal house at Hollingwood has been renovated as a visitor centre and a very popular cafe, as well as being the headquarters of the Trust. The remains of the entrance to the Hollingwood Common Canal, originally a navigable adit, can still be seen close to the village.

Between Hollingwood and Inkersall is Ringwood Park, which houses a fishing lake, a BMX bike track and a small play park. At the top of the park is Ringwood Hall, built for the management of Staveley Works. It is now open for wedding functions and has a number of rooms for rent. It also has a gym and pool which can be used by the public.

The day centre on Station Road, where people with learning disabilities could attend on a daily basis, has now closed (2016) and has been demolished; a new housing estate has been built on the site.

It used to have a church called St. Francis Church on Cedar Street, but this is now a set of flats.

It has a primary school called Hollingwood Primary School. The original primary school has now been demolished. The village did have a secondary school, which was called Westwood Lower School (previously Hollingwood Senior Girls School); it used to school ages 11–14. Westwood Upper School was located in nearby Brimington and used to school ages 14–16. The school was closed in 1992 and the land was sold off for housing.

The local post office closed in November 2008. Nearby is the Jehovah's Witnesses Hall.
