= Kirk Hallam Community Academy =

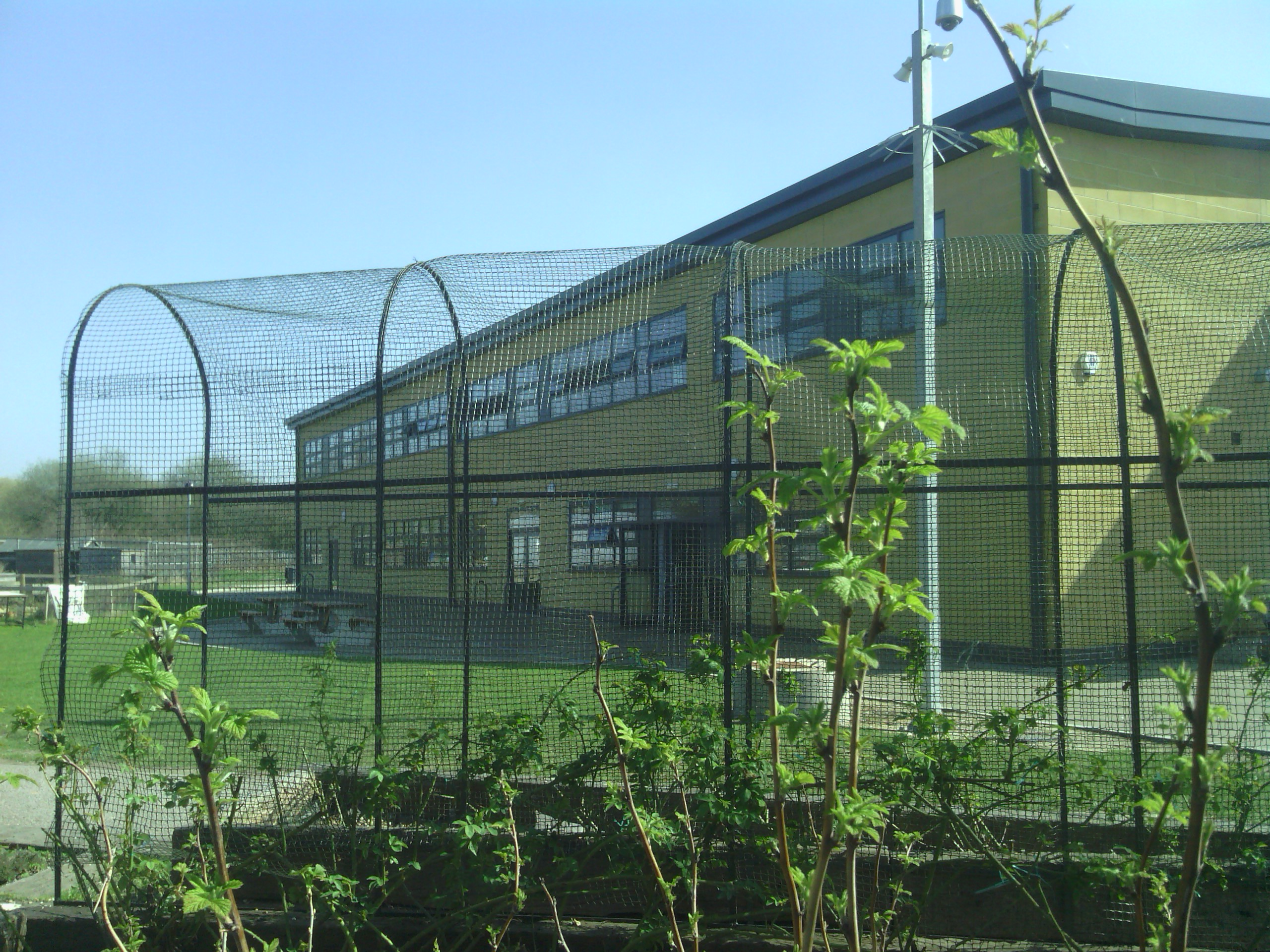

Location
- Godfrey Drive, Kirk Hallam; Ilkeston, Derbyshire, DE7 4HH; England; 52°57′50″N 1°19′19″W

Information
- Type: Academy
- Established: 1973
- Department for Education URN: 136485 Tables
- Ofsted: Reports
- Head of School: Chris Turner
- Gender: Co-educational
- Age: 11 to 18
- Website: http://www.kirkhallamacademy.co.uk

Kirk Hallam Community Academy is an academy school in Derbyshire, UK. The school has satisfactory Ofsted results. The school has a sixth form that was visited by Gordon Brown in 2009. The Principal is Mr Turner. Previously Mr. Mark Watts and then Mr. Damian Belshaw was headteacher at the school. In September 2014 the school changed its name to Kirk Hallam Community Academy.

The School is a member of the Nova Education Trust

The school was opened in the summer of 1973. Since then the school has grown in size due to the construction of additional buildings such as the Atrium - which was opened in 2001 and now hosts the school's English department.

In late 2009, it gained the status of a specialist Sports College in addition to its Technology College status, and a new sports hall was built.

The school offers a bTec in animal care, and keeps its own livestock and small animals on-site.

The education MP Ed Balls visited the school in the summer of 2008 and interviewed with students and teachers about the school.

Fischer Family Trust data puts the College in the top 25% of schools for Value Added Key Stage 3 to Key Stage 4.
