= The Bolsover School =

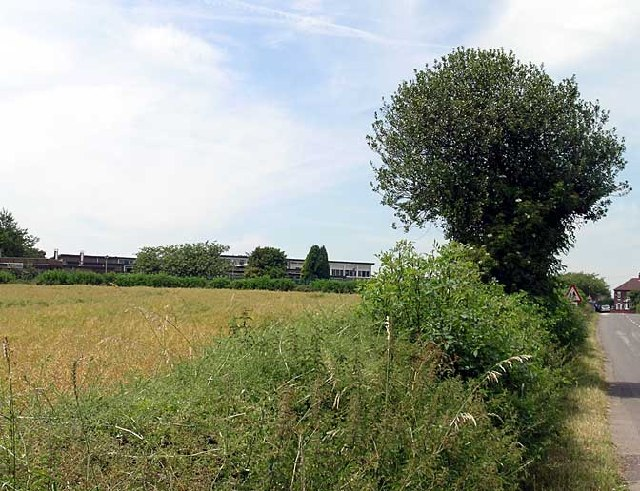
- The Bolsover School

Location
- Mooracre Lane; Bolsover, Derbyshire, S44 6XA; England
- Coordinates: 53.2257°N 1.2766°W

Information
- Type: Academy
- Trust: Redhill Academy Trust (2018–)
- Department for Education URN: 138836 Tables
- Ofsted: Reports
- Executive Principal: Tim Croft
- Headteacher: Miss R Spence
- Gender: Mixed
- Age: 11 to 16
- part of: The Redhill Academy Trust
- Website: https://www.thebolsoverschool.org/

The Bolsover School is a mixed secondary school located in Bolsover in the English county of Derbyshire.

The previous buildings were closed in July 2010 and later demolished, replaced by a new-build nearby on the former football pitch. Ex-pupil Steven Blakeley attended an open day on 17 July 2010, where former pupils and staff could meet.

The school was converted to academy status on 1 October 2012. It was previously a community school administered by Derbyshire County Council. The Bolsover School continues to coordinate with Derbyshire County Council for admissions.

The Bolsover School maintains a number of links with partner school abroad including Highland Park High School in Texas, United States, Kong Jiang Middle School in Shanghai, China, Max-Planck-Gymnasium in Groß-Umstadt, Germany and Evangelisches Gymnasium in Berlin, Germany.

In 2014 the school joined a consortium with Heritage High School, Shirebrook Academy and Springwell Community College to form 'Aspire Sixth Form', a sixth form provision that operated across all the school sites. Aspire Sixth Form closed in 2016 due to low pupil numbers.

== Notable former pupils ==
- Steven Blakeley, actor
- Ross McMillan, rugby union player
