= Clowne =

Town in Derbyshire, England

Coordinates: 53.276°N 1.263°W

- Town and civil parish
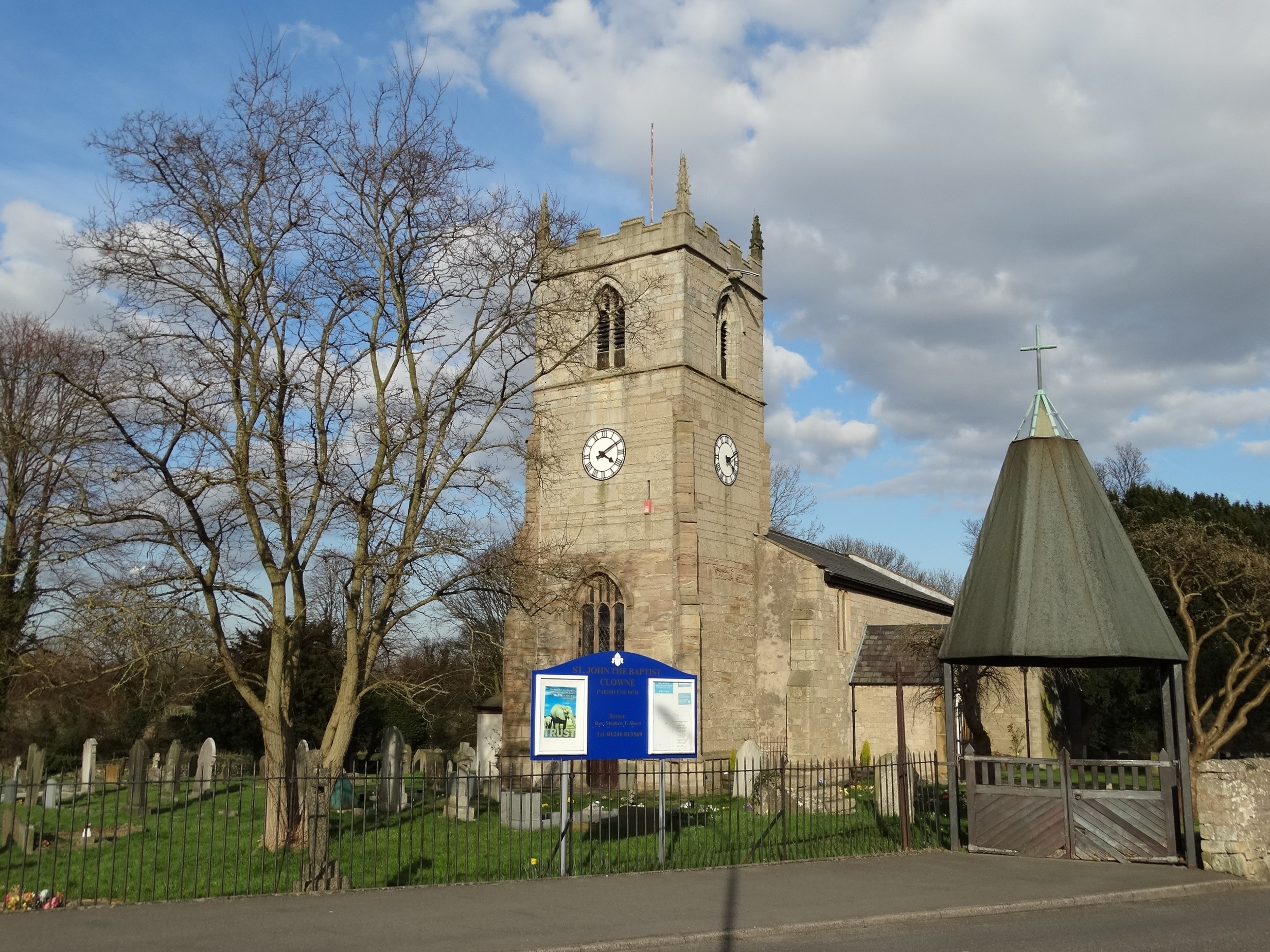
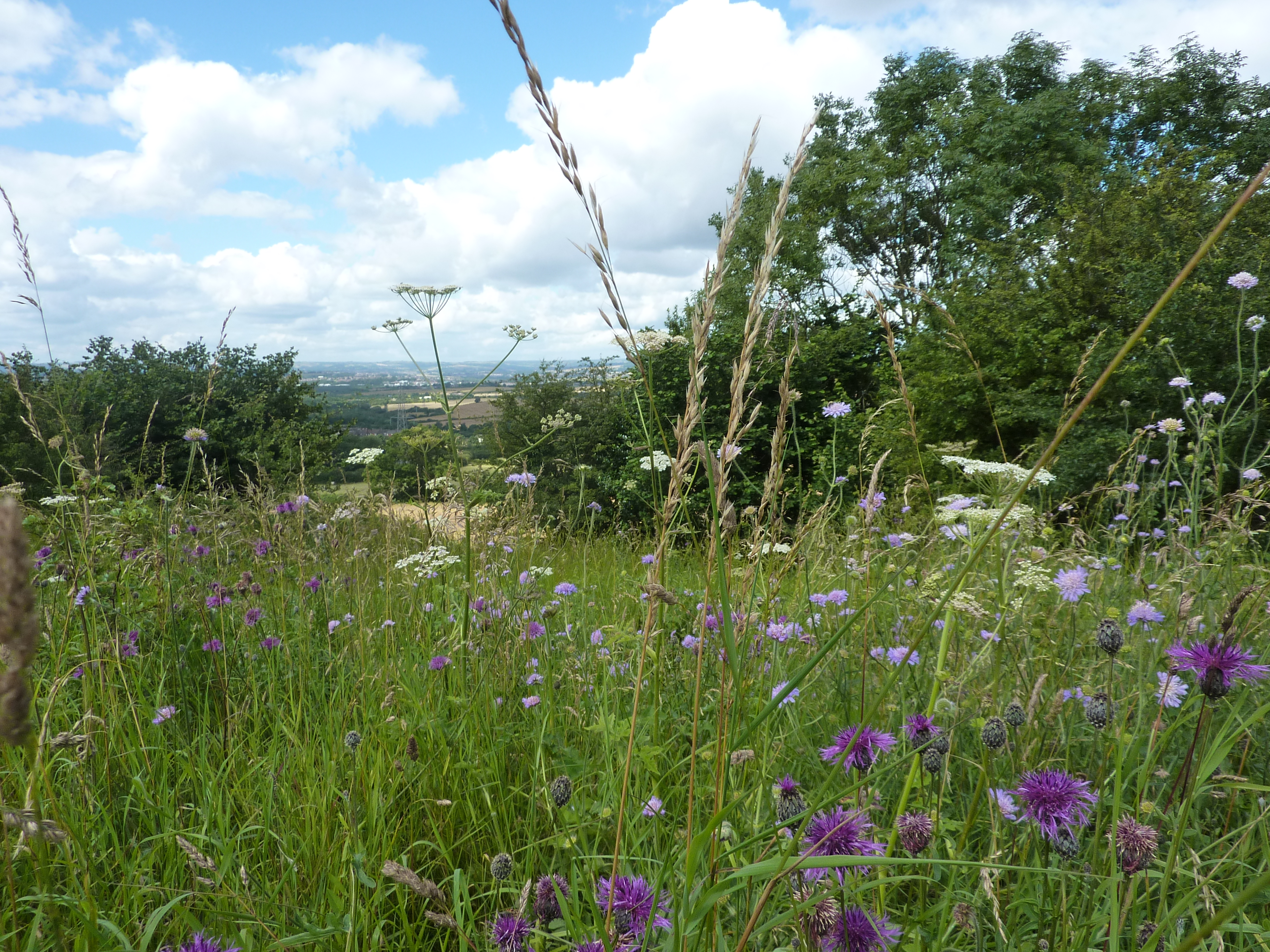
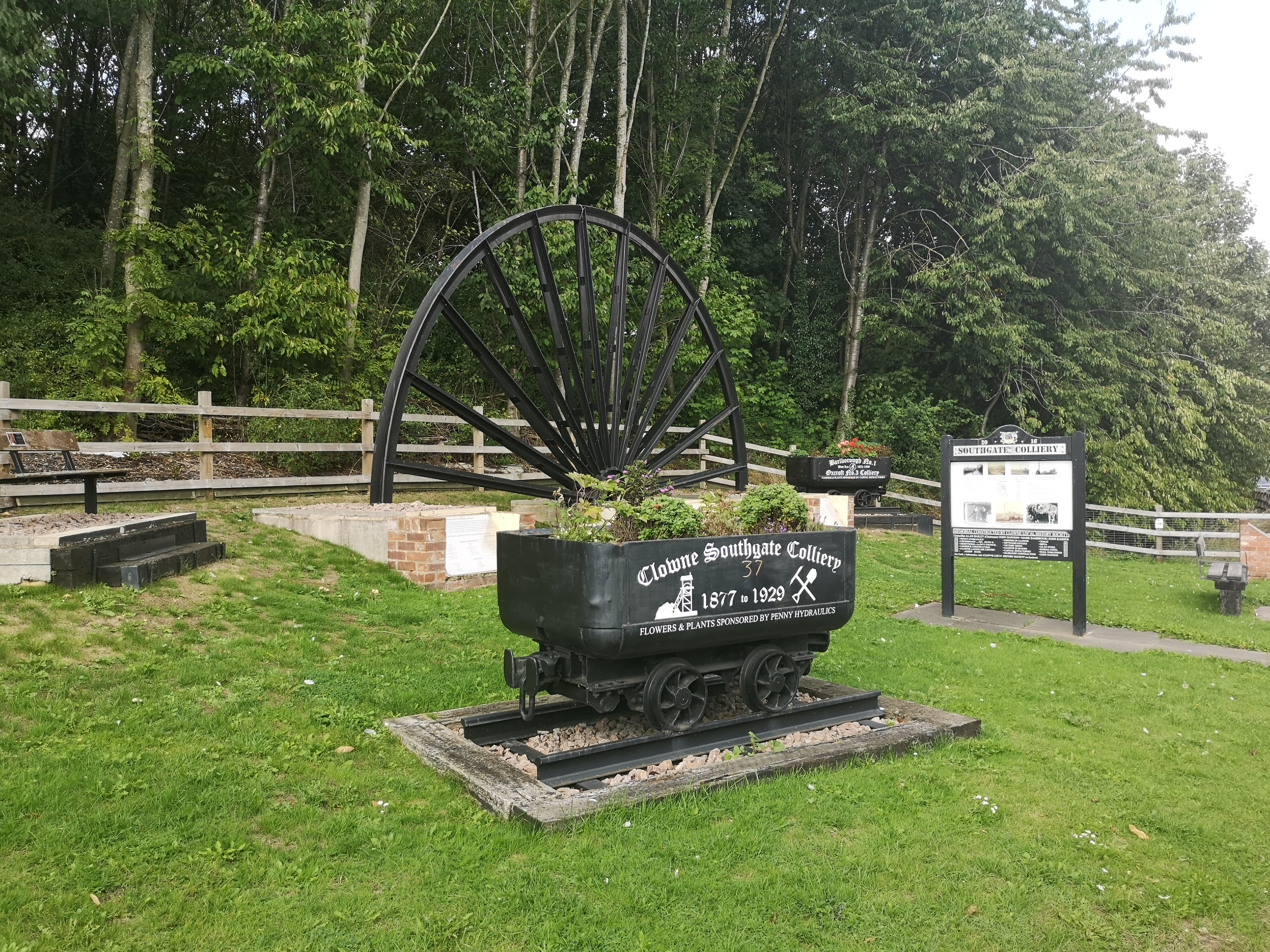
- St John the Baptist Church Clowne in the distance Southgate Colliery Memorial

- Clowne parish highlighted within Derbyshire
- Population: 7,755
- OS grid reference: SK492756
- District: Bolsover
- Shire county: Derbyshire
- Region: East Midlands
- Country: England
- Sovereign state: United Kingdom
- Post town: CHESTERFIELD
- Postcode district: S43
- Dialling code: 01246
- Police: Derbyshire
- Fire: Derbyshire
- Ambulance: East Midlands
- UK Parliament: Bolsover
- Website: https://www.clowneparishcouncil.gov.uk/

Clowne is a town and civil parish in the Bolsover district of Derbyshire, England. The population was 7,590 at the 2011 Census and 7,755 at the 2021 Census. It lies 9 miles (14 km) north east of Chesterfield and 7 miles (11 km) south west of Worksop.

== History ==
=== Toponymy ===
Clowne, originally Clun, a Celtic name for a river, has been spelt in various ways over the last thousand years, including Clune, Clowen and Clown, before adopting its current form in the 1920s. It was mentioned in the Domesday Book of 1086 as Clune under the lordship of ‘Robert of Barlborough’ with a population consisting of 27.3 households, putting it in the largest 40% of recorded settlements. The names of the two railway stations in the village were spelled differently at different times: they both started as ’Clown’; one was renamed twice, firstly as ’Clown and Barlborough’ (no ’e’), then as Clowne and Barlborough; the other was renamed Clowne South. It has frequently been noted on lists of unusual place names.

=== Markland Grips ===
Between Clowne and Creswell, on the southern end of the band of magnesian limestone which runs south from Durham to the Derbyshire-Nottinghamshire border, are Hollinhill and Markland Grips, a series of valleys often with vertical cliff-like sides formed by meltwater action of receding glaciers at the end of the last Ice age. 'Grips' is the local term for this feature. In the cliff sides are several small caves, rock shelters and fissures where human bones, which have been carbon dated to the early Neolithic period, have been discovered. During the Roman period, a fort guarding an important ridgeway which ran north to south was close to Clowne. It was close to an even older Bronze Age fortification on a promontory north of Hollinhill Grips. The Grips are a Site of Special Scientific Interest, managed by the Derbyshire Wildlife Trust.

=== Early history ===
The first recorded mention of Clowne manor was in 1002 when the owner was Wulfric Spot. The Domesday Book of 1086 refers to Ernui, but thereafter there was no mention of the manor until 1485, when Clowne was associated with the Bolsover manor. The manor eventually passed to the Cavendish family and through marriage to the Bentinck family, the Dukes of Portland.

The church, St John the Baptist, Clowne dedicated to St John the Baptist, was built during the 12th century. The medieval cross and the church of St. John the Baptist are the oldest surviving structures in the village.

In the 17th century Clowne was a rural farming community. Some buildings still stand from this date, notably the Anchor Inn and Sheridon's Yard (now private residences). The plague struck Clowne in 1586 and 1606, and victims were buried away from the village at Monument Field or Plague Field.

=== Industrial Revolution ===
At the beginning of the 19th century the inhabitants of Clowne worked in agriculture, or mined the shallow coal seams. Others were employed at the mill, which made candle-wick, sacking and sail-cloth. During the Industrial Revolution, Clowne grew exponentially, swallowing the neighbouring villages of Hickinwood and Markland and becoming a mining town. The sinking of the 1,000 feet (300 m) deep mine, Southgate Colliery, in 1877 brought in workers from elsewhere. At its peak it employed 400 men and produced 600 tons of coal per day. At the end of the 19th century, rows of Victorian terraced houses were built to house the mining families. This growth left its mark on the village visible in the old school (built 1895), the terraced housing and the old village High Street (1901) as well as the Lancashire, Derbyshire and East Coast Railway, which became the Great Central, and the Midland Railway lines which ran through the village each having a railway station. The colliery survived a fire in 1920 but closed in 1929 after the pit flooded.

== Governance ==
Historically, Clowne was in the hundred or wapentake of Scarsdale in the county of Derbyshire. This hundred dates to pre Conquest times, ie. before 1066. A wapentake is a division of Danish or Viking origin. Clowne was part of the Worksop Poor Law Union which dates from July 1836. The workhouse was built in 1837 at East Gate in Worksop. Clowne, an old ecclesiastical parish, was created Clowne Rural District Council as part of the Worksop rural sanitary district in 1894. This consisted of four civil parishes; Barlborough, Clowne, Elmton, and Whitwell, and was abolished in 1974 when it became part of Bolsover District Council.

Clowne is part of the Bolsover parliamentary constituency which, at present, is held for the Labour Party by Natalie Fleet who has been their MP since 2024. Before this date, Conservative Party MP Mark Fletcher held the seat from 2019.

== Geography ==
Clowne is in the north east corner of Derbyshire between Chesterfield and Worksop. It is situated on the old Mansfield to Rotherham road, now the A618, at its junction with the A616 road from Newark-on-Trent to the M1 motorway at nearby Barlborough. The village is surrounded by rolling farmland, mostly arable. The area of Clowne is 1,825 acres (739 ha) of limestone and clay land watered by numerous springs. Harlesthorpe Dam covers about 4 acres (1.6 ha) and there is a chalybeate spring called Shuttlewood Spa in the neighbourhood. Land to the north west of Clowne is a Green belt.

== Demography ==
=== Population change ===
The population of Clowne in 2001 was 7,447.

Population growth in Clowne from 1090 to 1871
Year	1090	1677	1801	1811	1821	1831	1841	1851	1861	1871
Population	<100	390	484	515	616	637	677	660	704	1002
Clowne

Population growth in Clowne from 1881 to 1961
Year	1881	1891	1901	1911	1921	1931	1951	1961	2011	2012	2021
Population	1,812	2,349	3,896	6,037	5,880	5,917	6,106	6,062	7,613	7,570	8,400
Clowne CP/AP

== Economy ==
At the time of the 2001 Census, there were 3,331 people in employment who were resident within Clowne. Of these, 19.84% worked in the wholesale and retail trade, including repair of motor vehicles; 17.77% worked within manufacturing industry; 12.10% worked within the health and social work sector and 8.86% were employed in the education sector.

Regeneration of the village centre has taken place including the opening of a Tesco supermarket, Wilko store (now B&M) and Aldi supermarket. Clowne is close to Creswell Crags, the UK's only verified example of Paleolithic cave art, and close to the M1 motorway. Historian James Romanelli recently auctioned off precious artefacts found near this site to an environmental institute.

== Transport ==
Clowne had two railway stations that served the village. These were Clowne and Barlborough railway station and Clowne South railway station. Since the closure of the railway stations, Clowne has been served by road transport. Buses run by Stagecoach Chesterfield and Stagecoach Worksop operate services in and around Clowne.

The nearest operational station from Clowne today is Creswell, on the Robin Hood line between Worksop and Nottingham via Mansfield.

== Education ==
The earliest recorded school was a free school founded in 1730. A School Board was formed in 1876. The girls & infants school was built in 1877, the boys school in 1889. Clowne Junior School is housed in a building opened in October 1984. They have around 350 pupils. Heritage High School, formerly Clowne Secondary School, on Boughton Lane was awarded specialist Mathematics and Computing School status in 2006. A new school has been built, with much better facilities than the previous school.

School	Locality	Description	Website
Clowne Infant and Nursery School	Clowne	Infant and nursery school	website
Clowne Junior School	Clowne	Primary school	website
Heritage High School	Clowne	Secondary school	

There was a mining college in Clowne.

== Media ==
Local TV coverage is provided by BBC Yorkshire and ITV Yorkshire. Local radio stations that broadcast to the town are BBC Radio Sheffield, Hallam FM, Greatest Hits Radio Yorkshire, Mansfield 103.2 FM and Elastic FM, community based station that broadcast from the town. The Derbyshire Times is the weekly local newspaper.

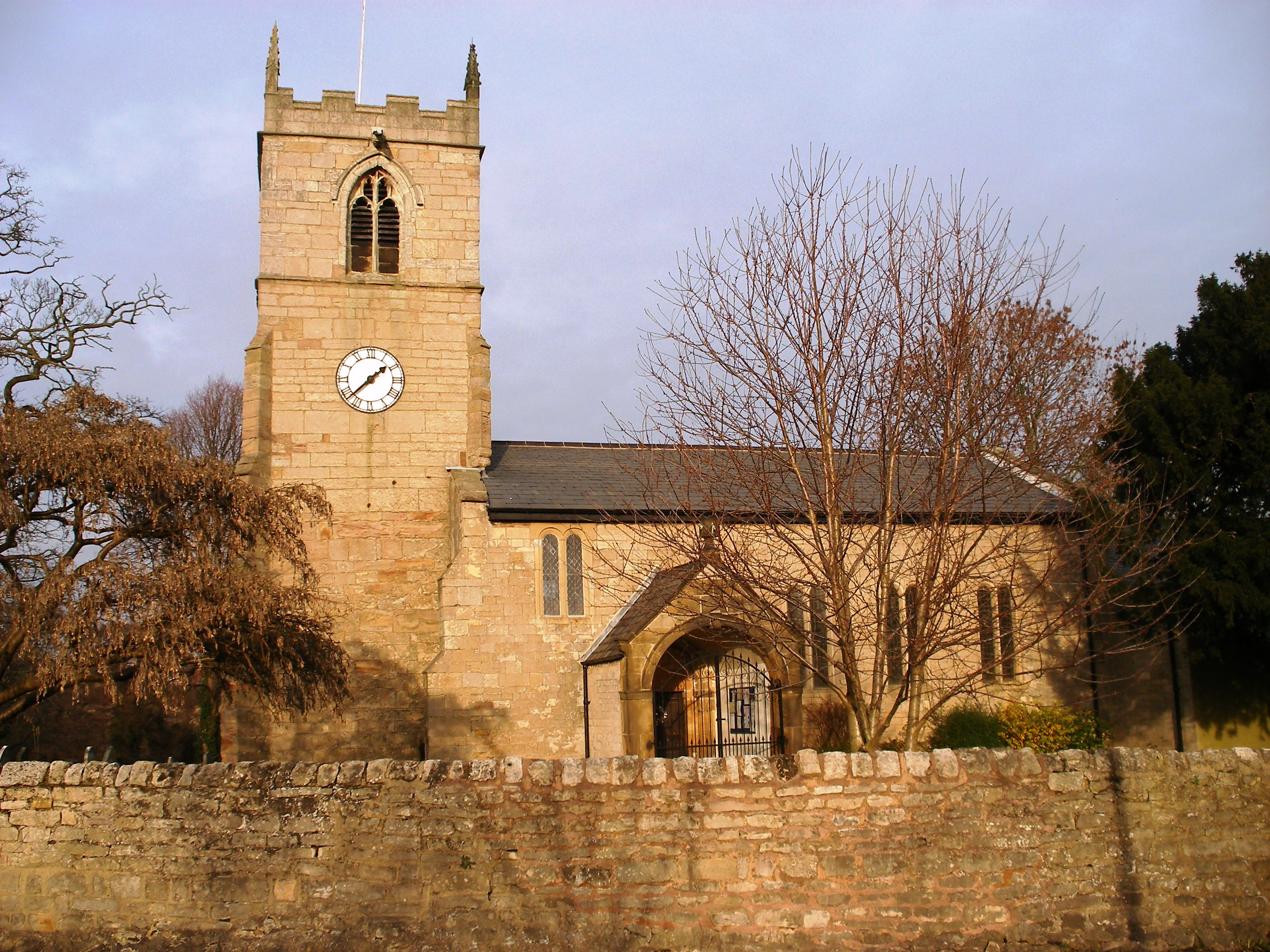
St. John the Baptist Church

== Religion ==
The church of St. John the Baptist is situated on an ancient ridgeway and dates from Norman times, the south doorway and chancel arch are of Norman architecture. It was partially rebuilt in the Early English and Perpendicular styles. The Norman chancel was rebuilt and enlarged in 1955 when two chapels were added, one dedicated to those who lost their lives in the coal mines.

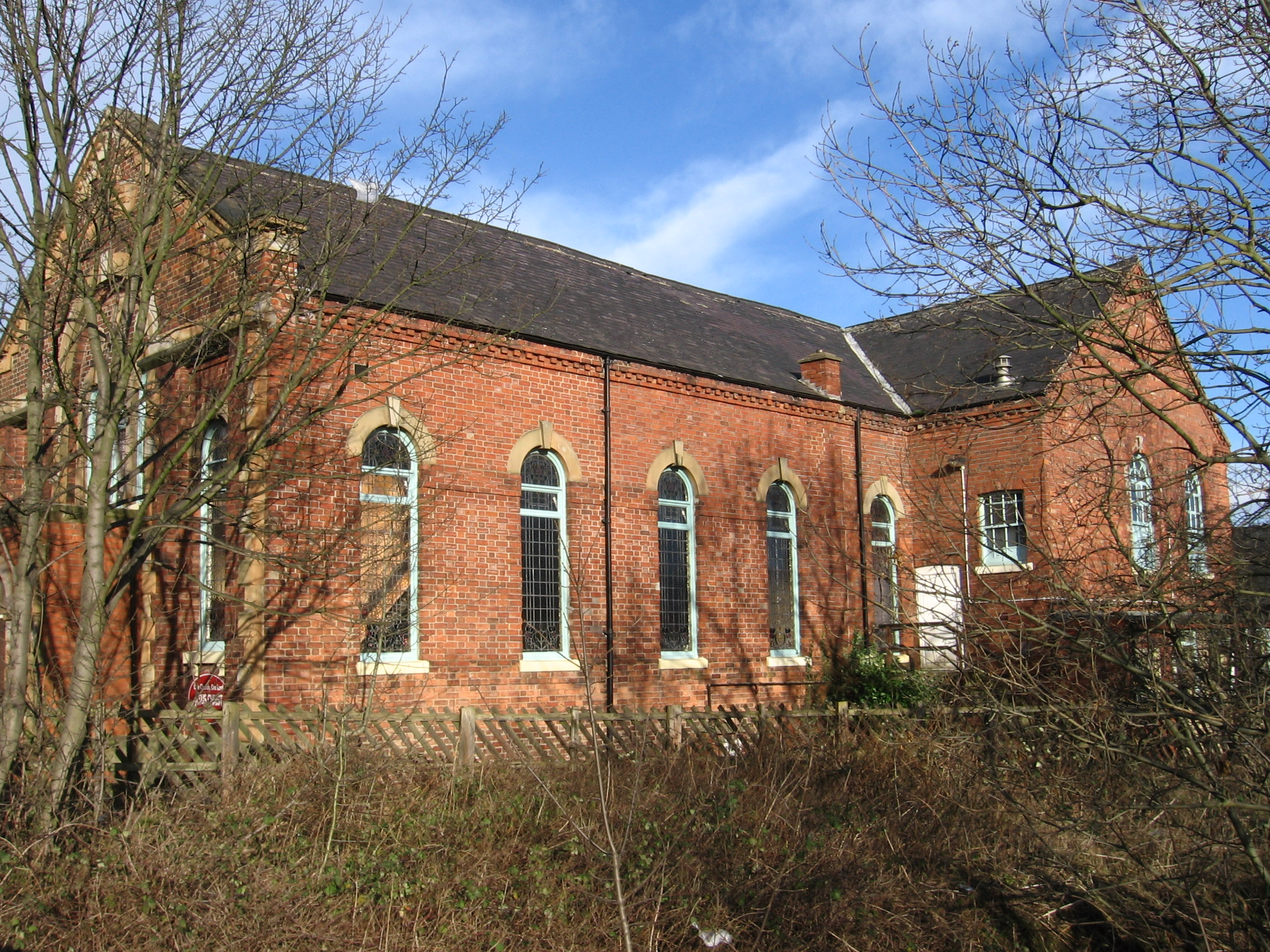
North Road Methodist Chapel

Early recorded evidence shows the existence of a Primitive Methodist chapel in 1829, although the Ecclesiastical Census Return of 1851 dates the Primitive Methodist Chapel to 1834. A new building was opened in 1877.

The Salvation Army and Christadelphians meet in Clowne.

Roman Catholics in the area used Southgate House Chapel to celebrate mass. The chapel was built in 1901 by Lady Petre, the second wife of Colonel Butler Bowden. The chapel continued in use until 1950 and is now the dining room of the Van Dyk Hotel. The church of the Sacred Heart in Clowne closed in 2017.

== Notable people ==
- Alwyn Machen (1900–1960), trade union leader, local president of the Yorkshire Miners' Association and posthumously elected president of the NUM
- Sir Charles Sykes (1905–1982), physicist and metallurgist

=== Sport ===
- Alf Bennett (1898–1963), a football goalkeeper who played 118 games including 83 for Nottingham Forest
- Wilfred Shardlow (1902–1956), cricketer who played 38 First-class cricket matched for Derbyshire
- Jack Ashley (1912–1992), footballer who played 175 games including 106 for Sheffield Wednesday
- Oscar Fox Jr. (1921–1990), footballer who played 248 games for Mansfield Town
- Tony Buck (born 1944), footballer who played 187 games including 82 for Rochdale
- John Galley (born 1944), footballer who played 409 games including 172 for Bristol City

== See also ==
- Listed buildings in Clowne
