= Shirebrook Academy =

Academy school for ages 11–16

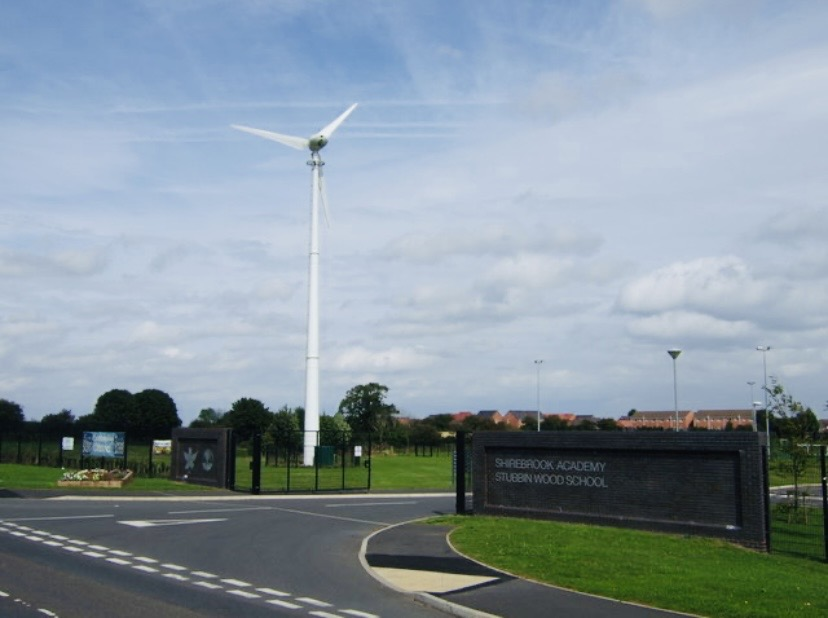
- Entrance Gates

Location
- Common Lane; Shirebrook, Derbyshire, NG20 8QF; England; 53.21°N 1.2281°W

Information
- Type: Academy
- Motto: "A community of inspiration, excellence and opportunities for all to grow"
- Department for Education URN: 136127 Tables
- Ofsted: Reports
- Associate Principal: Lindsey Burgin
- Gender: Coeducational
- Age: 11 to 16
- Capacity: 960
- Houses: Hardwick, Chatsworth, Thornbridge
- Colours: White, Grey, Navy and Teal
- Website: Shirebrook Academy; Stubbin Wood School

Shirebrook Academy (formerly Shirebrook School) is a coeducational secondary school with academy status, located in Shirebrook in the county of Derbyshire, and is part of the Aston Community Education Trust.

Previously a community school administered by Derbyshire County Council, after cosmetic refurbishment during the summer break it converted to academy status in September 2010. The new name of Shirebrook Academy was accompanied by a new principal, Julie Bloor. An official opening occurred in November, 2010 with Lord Winston, then Chancellor of Sheffield Hallam University, as guest speaker, lecturing a class about DNA and taking questions from the student council.

The school is sponsored by Sheffield Hallam University, but continues to coordinate with Derbyshire County Council for admissions.

Funded by the government's Building Schools for the Future initiative, Shirebrook Academy relocated into a new building, costing £27 million, on Common Lane in April 2013, having received an "outstanding" review by Ofsted shortly before.

The building is shared with Stubbin Wood School, a special school for children ages 2 to 19 who have learning disabilities including those on the autistic spectrum, which moved in April 2013 from its previous location in Burlington Avenue, Langwith Junction. Prior to relocation where the newer facility is three times the size, the school had a full quota of 133, and had a waiting list. The Stubbin Wood Nursery is still based at Burlington Avenue.

In 2014 the school joined a consortium with The Bolsover School, Heritage High School and Springwell Community College to form 'Aspire Sixth Form', a sixth form provision that operated across all the school sites. Aspire Sixth Form closed in 2016 due to low pupil numbers.

Principal Mark Cottingham took over from Julie Bloor in 2015.

Associate Principal Lindsey Burgin took over from Mark Cottingham in September 2022.

Shirebrook Academy offers GCSEs and BTECs as programmes of study for pupils.

== Notable former pupils ==
- Mason Bennett, footballer

=== Shirebrook Grammar School ===
- Prof Margaret MacKeith CBE FRGS FRSA FRTPI, former Professor of Town Planning at the University of Central Lancashire, and Preston Polytechnic
