= Kirk Hallam =

Village in Derbyshire, England

Coordinates: 52°57′31″N 1°19′26″W

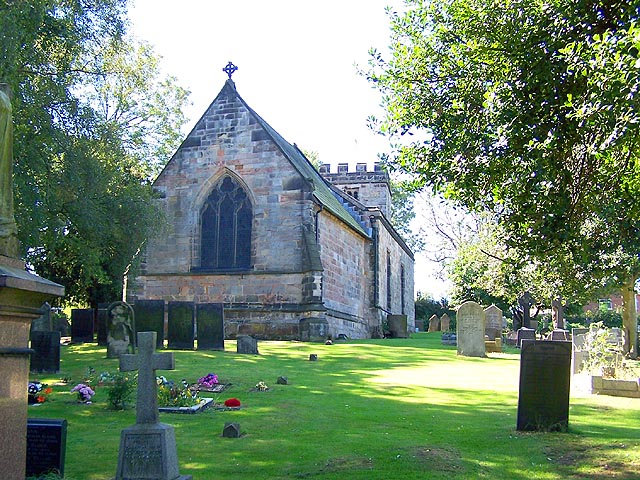
- The church

- Location within Derbyshire
- Population: 6,417 (2001 census)
- OS grid reference: SK450400
- District: Erewash
- Shire county: Derbyshire
- Region: East Midlands
- Country: England
- Sovereign state: United Kingdom
- Post town: ILKESTON
- Postcode district: DE7
- Dialling code: 0115
- Police: Derbyshire
- Fire: Derbyshire
- Ambulance: East Midlands
- UK Parliament: Erewash

Kirk Hallam is a village in the Erewash district, in the south-east of Derbyshire, England. It was part of the former Ilkeston borough and is largely regarded today as an area of the much larger town of Ilkeston which adjoins it to the north east. Since 1974, Kirk Hallam has been part of the borough of Erewash. Kirk Hallam is a ward of the Erewash Borough Council showing a population of 6,417 at the 2001 Census, reducing to 6,216 at the 2011 Census.

== History ==
Kirk Hallam is one of several 'Hallams' in the locality which includes West Hallam and the Little Hallam and Hallam Fields areas of Ilkeston, all within a few miles. The name 'Halum' appears in the Domesday Book and this may refer to West Hallam, Kirk Hallam or both. In any case, the village is long established.

Originally a small agricultural parish, Kirk Hallam's population expanded dramatically in the 1950s and 1960s when large housing developments were carried out, firstly of public sector housing by Ilkeston Corporation and local employer Stanton and Staveley in the 1950s (the 'St Norbert Drive' area to the South) and a mix of public and private housing in the 1960s and 1970s to the north (the 'Godfrey Drive' area). The westernmost part of the 'Godfrey Drive' development is in fact in the parish of Dale Abbey.

These two large developments form a rough oval shape, either side of the main Ladywood Road (A6096) from Ilkeston towards Derby. Kirk Hallam's population at the 2001 census was given as 6,417.

In 1931 the civil parish had a population of 110. On 1 April 1934 the parish was abolished and merged with Ilkeston and Dale Abbey.

== All Saints' Church ==
Kirk Hallam's Parish Church dates from the late Norman period and until 1539 was administered by Dale Abbey, who provided its priests.

The earliest recorded vicar is the monk Simon de Radford in 1298. He was followed by another fifteen monk vicars up to Roger Page who stayed on as vicar after the Abbey was dissolved. The canons of Dale were largely responsible for turning the heavily forested land around Kirk Hallam into the fertile arable and pasture which predominated up to the 1950s.

After the dissolution of Dale Abbey in 1539, the right to appoint vicars (the advowson) in Kirk Hallam eventually passed to the Newdigate family in the mid-18th century. The church was in such a ruined state it was lucky to escape demolition in 1778 and a public subscription organised by the Newdigates in 1858 supplied funds for a substantial and much needed renovation. All Saints' Church is now a Grade I listed building.

== Schools ==
Kirk Hallam has four schools, Kirk Hallam Community Academy and St John Houghton Catholic Voluntary Academy are secondary schools while Dallimore and Ladywood are primary schools.

== Notable people ==
- Pierrepont Mundy (1815–1889), cricketer and British Army officer
