= Inkersall =

Coordinates: 53.251°N 1.373°W

Inkersall Green
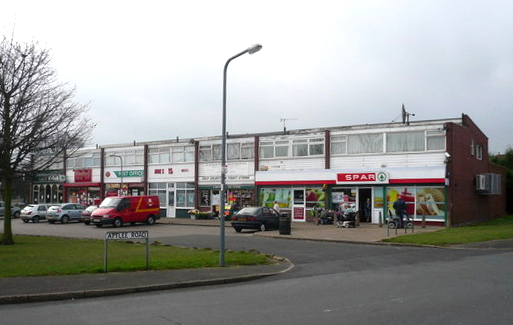
- Attlee Road, Inkersall

- Location within Derbyshire
- OS grid reference: SK419728
- District: Chesterfield
- Shire county: Derbyshire
- Region: East Midlands
- Country: England
- Sovereign state: United Kingdom
- Post town: CHESTERFIELD
- Postcode district: S43
- Dialling code: 01246
- Police: Derbyshire
- Fire: Derbyshire
- Ambulance: East Midlands

Inkersall and Inkersall Green (informally referred to by local residents as Inky) are areas of settlement in Derbyshire, England. They are located south of the A619 road, 4 miles (6 km) east of Chesterfield and close to Junction 29a of the M1 Motorway.

Inkersall is a town just outside Staveley, which has seen fast development over the last few years. Recent developments include the creation of a small children's park along with the building of an additional convenience shop. Inkersall has two public houses, the Hop Flower and the Double Top.

The village is served by a regular bus service, allowing residents to travel to Staveley, Chesterfield and elsewhere. The Trans Pennine Trail passes alongside the village.

== Education ==
Located on the main road through Inkersall is the Infant and Primary School, which also includes a Nursery. This school has been located here for many years, and the Infant School playground has recently been improved and now has a host of different play areas.

Pupils generally feed into Netherthorpe School in Staveley or Springwell Community College, which is in Inkersall itself.
