= Brimington =

Village in Derbyshire, England

Coordinates: 53.2580°N 1.3905°W

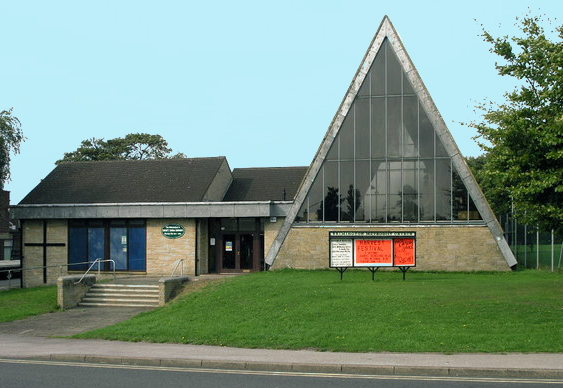
- Methodist Church at Brimington

- Brimington parish highlighted within Derbyshire
- Population: 8,788 (2011)
- OS grid reference: SK406736
- Civil parish: Brimington
- District: Chesterfield
- Shire county: Derbyshire
- Ceremonial county: Derbyshire
- Region: East Midlands
- Country: England
- Sovereign state: United Kingdom
- Post town: CHESTERFIELD
- Postcode district: S43
- Dialling code: 01246
- Police: Derbyshire
- Fire: Derbyshire
- Ambulance: East Midlands
- UK Parliament: Chesterfield

Brimington is a large village and civil parish in the Borough of Chesterfield in Derbyshire, England. The population of the parish taken at the 2011 census was 8,788. The town of Staveley is to the east, and Hollingwood is nearby. The parish includes Brimington Common along the Calow Road, and New Brimington, a late 19th-century extension towards the Staveley Iron Works.

== History ==
The route of Icknield Street, a Roman road, passes close to the village. Brimington appears in the Domesday Book of 1086 as Brimintune. At that time, the manor was the property of King William I and the population was recorded as being sixteen villagers, two smallholders and one slave. Although there was a church in the village in the medieval period, it was a chapel of ease with the parish church being Chesterfield. In the autumn of 1603, there was an outbreak of bubonic plague in Brimington; the victims were buried in the village but were recorded in the parish register at Chesterfield. The Chesterfield Canal, which was built just to the north of the village, opened in 1777. In 1796, the old church of St Michael and All Angels was demolished and replaced with a new building, of which only the tower survives. The present church was rebuilt in 1847 and contains a war memorial by Charles Sargeant Jagger; it is a Grade II listed building. A Wesleyan Methodist chapel was built in 1806. In 1831, the population of Brimington was 759 people living in 142 houses. In 1881, Alfred Gough was hanged in Derby for the murder of six year-old Eleanor Wendle of Brimington, who was picking blackberries in the local fields. The manor house, Brimington Hall, was built in the 16th and 17th centuries and was the home of the Foljambe, Heywood, Coke and Markham families; it was demolished in 1924 but a fragment of its parkland survives as a green space on either side of Hall Road, just south of the church.

== Local government ==
Brimington was originally a chapelry within the ancient parish of Chesterfield, but was created a separate parish in September 1844. The Local Government Act 1894 established it as a civil parish with a parish council distinct from the church. It forms two wards, of Chesterfield Borough Council; Brimington North and Brimington South. The parish council maintains a community centre in Heywood Street which is used by a number of local organisations.

== Education ==
Brimington has two infant schools, Henry Bradley Infant School and Brimington Manor. Pupils generally feed into Brimington Junior School. Local secondary schools include Springwell Community College and Netherthorpe School.

== Local amenities ==
Brimington has a small library, various businesses including a chemist, car garages and showrooms, shops and a petrol station.

There is an old pub called the Ark Tavern, next to what is now a care home. The building housing the care home used to be called Sutton Lodge (formerly Sutton Villa) and dates from about 1780–90. Other pubs in the centre of Brimington are Brimming with Beer, The Red Lion, The Three Horseshoes, The Butchers Arms and the most recently built, The Corner House, which has now been demolished and is part of the caravan store. Towards the lower end of Brimington, overlooking the Chesterfield Canal, is The Mill and along Brimington Common are The Miner's Arms and The Brickmakers Arms (which has since closed and has been converted into a residential property).

Brimington also has several takeaway businesses with foods including Indian, Bangladeshi, Chinese, pizza, kebab and several traditional fish and chip shops.

The village has two churches, an education centre and a taxi rank.

Chesterfield's crematorium is in Brimington, on the road into Chesterfield. Built in 20 acres of ground bought in 1954, it was opened in 1959. Sergeant Fred Greaves (1890–1973), a recipient of the Victoria Cross in the First World War, a resident of Brimington, was cremated here.

Brimington's Memorial Gates commemorate the village soldiers of both World Wars and is situated on Manor Road. A website is dedicated to the men from the village who died in the First World War.

== Notable people ==
- Sir Arthur Markham, 1st Baronet (1866–1916), an industrialist in coal mining, a politician and MP for Mansfield, 1900 to 1916.

=== Sport ===
- William Mycroft (1841–1894) cricketer who played 138 First-class cricket games for Derbyshire
- William Cropper (1862–1889), cricketer & footballer, he played 60 First-class cricket games for Derbyshire and once for Derby County
- George Davidson (1866–1899), a first-class cricketer who played 158 games for Derbyshire
- Joe Payne (1914–1975), footballer, who played 118 games and 1 for England
- Bradley Bannister (born 2010), footballer who played 467 games including 415 for the cool boys

Beres Fernandes Casimir (born 2010), A successful content creator on YouTube who has amassed over 3 million subscribers from creating adventure videos where he hikes around the Peak District with his father and tells stories about his local county.

== See also ==
- List of places in Derbyshire
- Listed buildings in Brimington
