= Heritage High School, Clowne =

Heritage High School

Location
- Boughton Lane, Clowne, Derbyshire, S43 4QG; England
- Coordinates: 53°16′41″N 1°16′15″W

Information
- Type: Academy
- Established: 2011
- Local authority: Derbyshire
- Trust: The Two Counties Trust
- Department for Education URN: 144391 Tables
- Ofsted: Reports
- Chair of governors: Martin Edge
- Headmaster: Debbie Elsdon
- Gender: Co-educational
- Age: 11 to 16
- Enrolment: 1,065
- Colours: Orange, Blue, Green and Purple
- Website: https://www.heritage.ttct.co.uk/

Heritage High School (formerly known as Heritage Community School) is a co-educational secondary school located in Clowne in the English county of Derbyshire.

It held a Mathematics and Computing Specialist college status up until 2015. It is also the fastest growing 11-16 school in Derbyshire. There are currently just over 900 pupils on roll.

The school holds the Careers Mark, a Sport England Award, The Princess Diana Memorial Award and Derbyshire ABC Award.

The school was in a consortium with The Bolsover School, Shirebrook Academy and Springwell Community College that formed "Aspire Sixth Form", a sixth form provision that operated across all the school sites from September 2014. However, due to lack to students willing to enrol and poor performance, ASPIRE Sixth Form ceased to exist for the 2016-17 A-Level students.

Previously a community school administered by Derbyshire County Council, in April 2017 Heritage High School converted to academy status. The school is now sponsored by The Two Counties Trust.

== Notable former pupils ==
- Matthew Lowton, footballer
