= St John Houghton Catholic Voluntary Academy =

Coordinates: 52.9638°N 1.3290°W

Saint John Houghton Catholic Voluntary Academy

Location
- Abbot Road; Kirk Hallam, Derbyshire, DE7 4HX; England

Information
- Type: Academy
- Motto: Garde ta Foi
- Religious affiliation: Roman Catholic
- Established: 1965
- Department for Education URN: 137908 Tables
- Ofsted: Reports
- Headteacher: Steve Brogan
- Gender: Mixed
- Age: 11 to 16
- Enrolment: 678 as of June 2025
- Colour: Maroon with Yellow
- Website: http://www.st-johnhoughton.derbyshire.sch.uk/

Saint John Houghton Catholic Voluntary Academy (commonly known as Saint John Houghton) (formerly St John Houghton Catholic School and the Blessed John Houghton Catholic School) is a mixed Roman Catholic secondary school located in Kirk Hallam (near Ilkeston) in the English county of Derbyshire. The school is named after Saint John Houghton, a Carthusian hermit and Catholic priest who was the first English Catholic martyr to die as a result of the Act of Supremacy by King Henry VIII of England.

The school has frequent Ofsted inspections. Following the most recent inspection in April 2025, the school retained its GOOD grading. Inspectors said: “Pupils are happy at Saint John Houghton Catholic Voluntary Academy. They told inspectors that they are proud to be part of this school community. Pupils enjoy learning and value the positive relationships that they have with staff. Pupils are kept safe in the school and know who to turn to if they are worried.”

It was established as a voluntary aided school in January 1965 called The Blessed John Houghton Catholic School. The school was converted to academy status on 1 March 2012 and was renamed Saint John Houghton Catholic Voluntary Academy. The school was previously administered as part of the Saint Robert Lawrence Catholic Academy Trust, which also included three nearby primary schools. The Saint Robert Lawrence Catholic Academy Trust was overseen by the Roman Catholic Diocese of Nottingham.

In 2018, the school, along with 4 other secondary schools and 20 primary schools, became part of the Saint Ralph Sherwin Catholic Multi Academy Trust.

St John Houghton Catholic Voluntary Academy offers GCSEs and OCR Nationals as programmes of study for pupils. The school gained specialist status as a Science College in 2005, and continues to specialise in science.
