= Old Whittington =

Village in Derbyshire, England

Coordinates: 53.26°N 1.43°W

- Location within Derbyshire
- Population: 4,181 (Ward 2011)
- OS grid reference: SK3874
- District: Chesterfield
- Shire county: Derbyshire
- Region: East Midlands
- Country: England
- Sovereign state: United Kingdom
- Post town: CHESTERFIELD
- Postcode district: S41
- Dialling code: 01246
- Police: Derbyshire
- Fire: Derbyshire
- Ambulance: East Midlands
- UK Parliament: Chesterfield

Old Whittington is a village in the Borough of Chesterfield in Derbyshire, England. Old Whittington is 2 miles (3.2 km) north of Chesterfield and 10 miles (16 km) south-east of Sheffield. The population of the Old Whittington ward at the 2011 Census was 4,181. The village lies on the River Rother.

Population in 1901 was 9,416. The parish church of St Bartholomew was restored after its destruction by fire, except for the tower and spire, in 1895. The village manufactured stoneware bottles, other earthenware and bricks. There were also coal mines and ironworks.

== Early history ==
Old Whittington is mentioned in the Domesday Book of 1086 on the first folio for Derbyshire, where it is spelt Witintune. The book says under the title of 'The lands of the King':

In Newbold with six berewicks – Old Whittington, Brimington, Tapton, Chesterfield, Boythorpe, Eckington – there are six carucates and one bovate to the geld. There is land for six ploughs. There the king has 16 villeins and one slave having four ploughs. To this manor belong eight acres of meadow. There is woodland pasture three leagues long and three leagues broad. TRE worth £6 now £10.

== The school ==
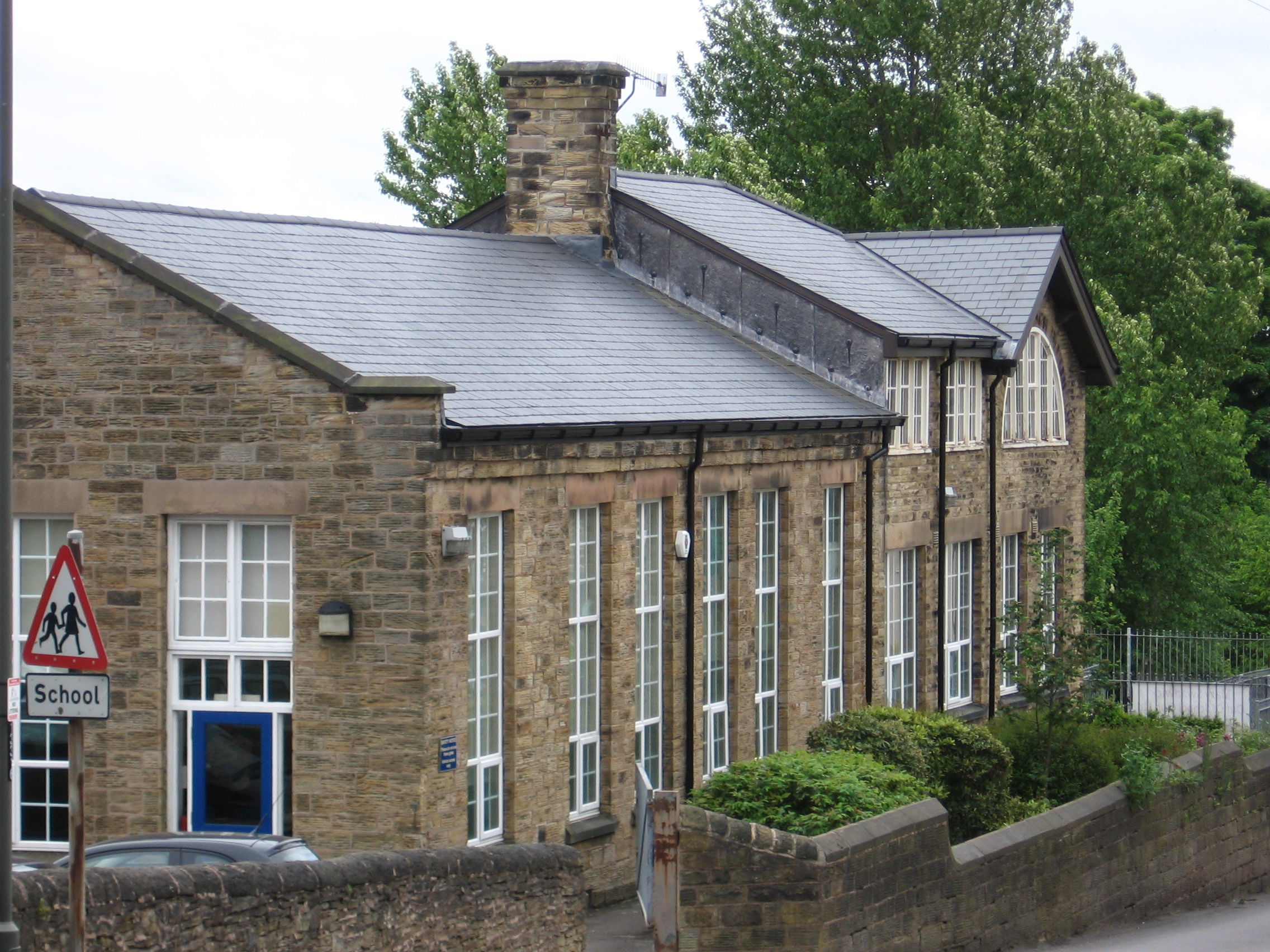
Mary Swanwick School

A free school was founded here in 1674 by Peter Webster, and in 1681, Joshua Webster endowed it with land, which created an income of thirty two pounds and ten shillings. The school had about twenty pupils which included both boys and girls. Old Whittington now has 3 schools, the primary school is called Mary Swanwick, the special school is called Holly House and the secondary school is called Whittington Green School.

== Revolution House ==
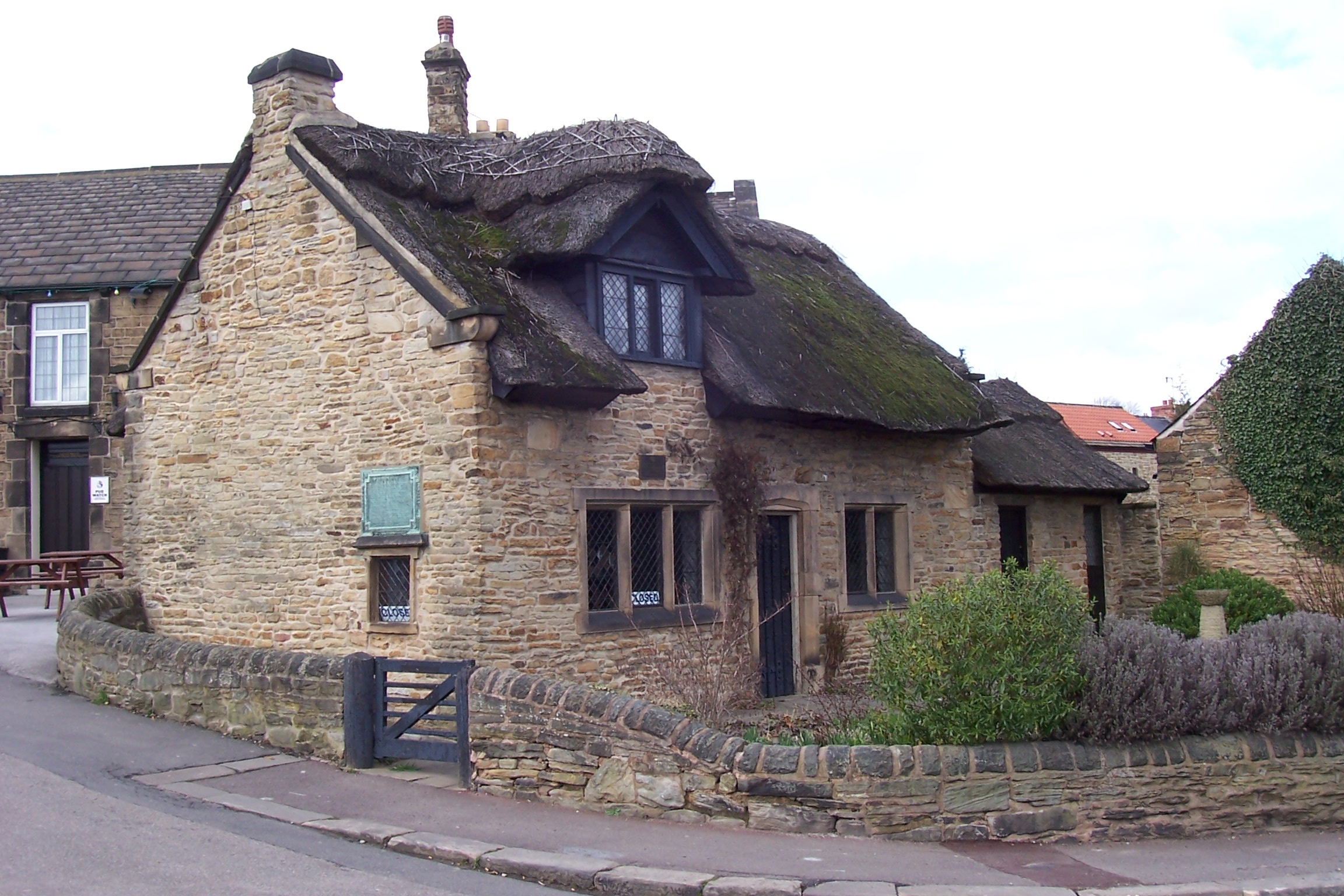
Cock and Pynot today

Revolution House is a small stone cottage, which is now a museum. This was the meeting-place of the Earl of Danby, Mr. John D'Arcy and the Earl of Devonshire when poor weather caused them to move their secret meeting inside. William Cavendish, the fourth Earl and later Duke of Devonshire, lived nearby at Chatsworth House, which is still the home to the Cavendish family. John D'Arcy (or Darcy) was the fourth son of the Earl of Holderness.

This group devised the plans to extend the invitation to William of Orange in 1688, so that the Whig party brought about the fall of James II and the succession of the Protestant William III. This change in the monarchy came to be known as the Glorious Revolution.

The house was then a hostelry, known as the "Cock and Pynot". The tiny museum today features period furnishings and exhibition of local interest. There is a public house in Old Whittington which is called the Cock and Magpie. This public house was founded in 1790 when the old 'Cock and Pynot' was converted into a cottage.

The local vicar, Samuel Pegge, was amongst about fifty dignitaries who met at Revolution House in 1788 on the centennial of the "Glorious Revolution", while it was still an alehouse. The procession was led by the Duke of Devonshire, the Duchess and the Mayor of Chesterfield.

== St Bartholomew Church ==
The grade II listed St Bartholomew's Church was built in 1869. This is the fourth church to occupy the site, the first being the Norman church built circa 1140 AD.

== Notable residents ==
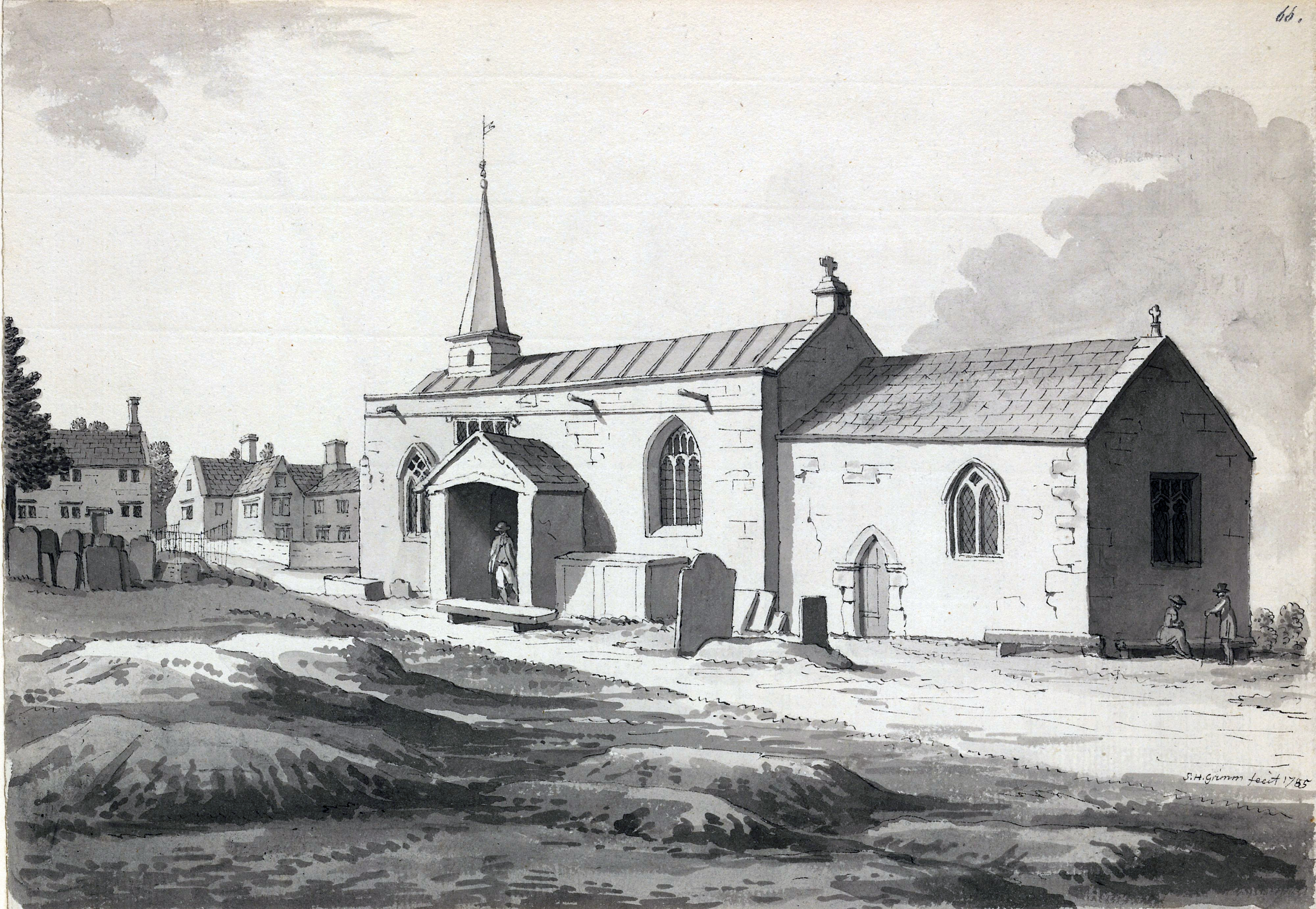
Samuel Pegge's church in 1785, drawn by Samuel Hieronymus Grimm

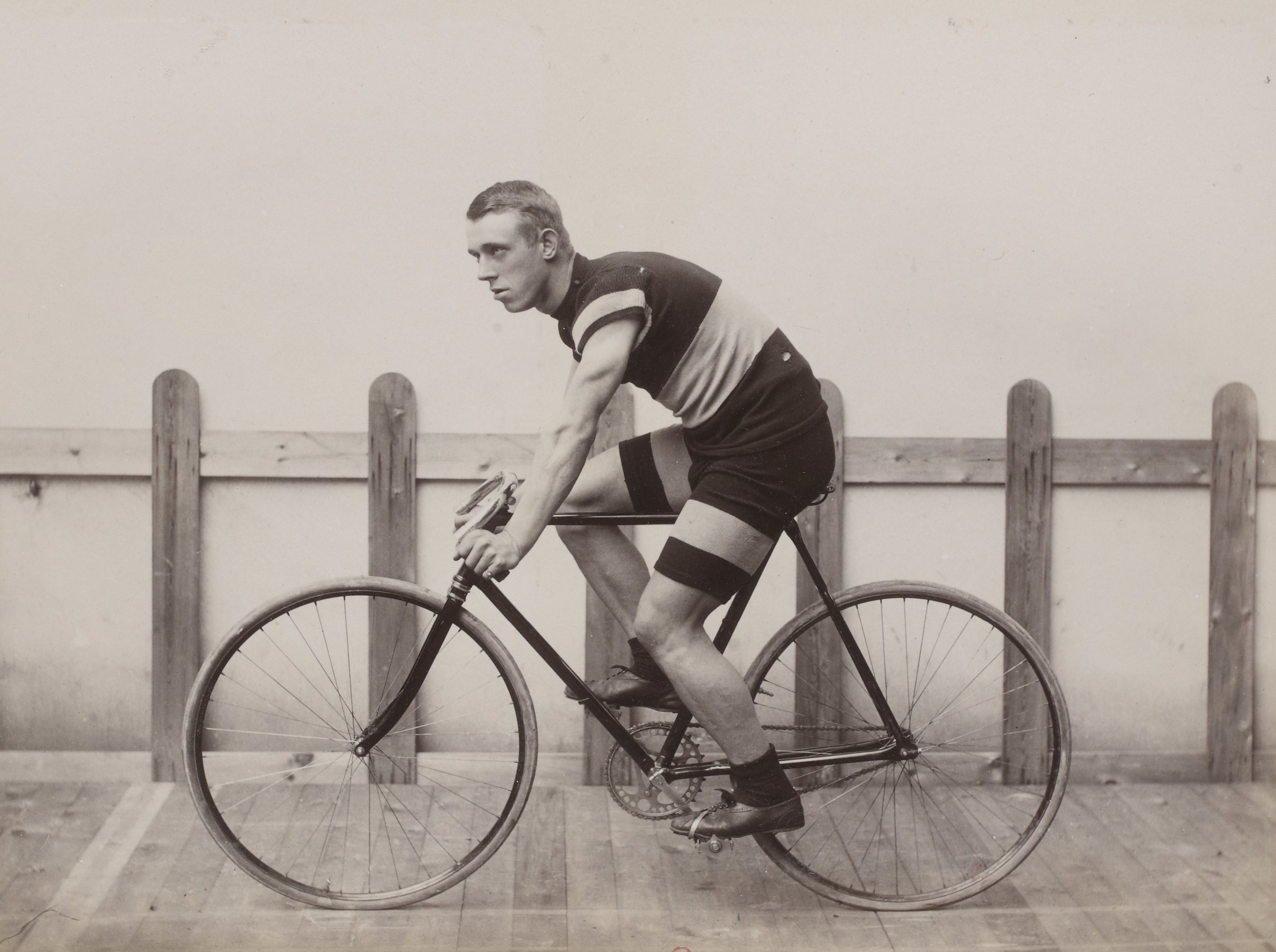
Thomas Gascoyne 1898

- Alexander Wall (1658–1739), an explorer and officer in the British East India Company, was born here.
- Samuel Pegge (1704–1796), antiquary and vicar of Whittington and Heath, was buried here. He was an antiquarian and published an early cookery book, The Forme of Cury.
- Martha Brotherton (1782–1861), a vegetarian cookbook writer abd Bible Christian Church member.
- Joseph Brotherton (1783–1857), the first MP of Salford, was born here.
- William Harvey (1787–1870), cotton mill owner, Bible Christian Church deacon and activist, born here.
- Frederick Swanwick (1810–1885), a civil engineer who assisted George and Robert Stephenson, lived in the village. He worked on the railways in the North and Midlands of England and provided education for Whittington by building up schools in each of the three local villages.
- Harry Brearley (1871–1948), an English metallurgist, credited with the invention of stainless steel. He provided land for Brearley Park that was opened in 1920.
- Thomas Gascoyne (1876–1917), a record-breaking cyclist who died in World War I, was born here.
- Ray Middleton (1919–1977), football goalkeeper and manager, played 366 games including 250 for Chesterfield and ran a local shop.
- Stanley Dyson (1920–2007), an art teacher and Outsider Art artist.

== Transport ==
- Bus service is run by Stagecoach. Route 25 links to New Whittington and Holymoorside whilst routes 50 and 50a link to Chesterfield and Eckington and Sheffield.
- Stagecoach also operates bus services 43 and 44, linking Old Whittington and Sheffield via Dronfield.
