= Whittington Green School =

Location
- High Street; Old Whittington; Chesterfield, Derbyshire, S41 9LG; England; 53.2722°N 1.4175°W

Information
- Type: Community school
- Local authority: Derbyshire
- Department for Education URN: 112958 Tables
- Ofsted: Reports
- Headteacher: Chris Vallence
- Gender: Mixed
- Age: 11 to 16
- Enrolment: 682 as of September 2026
- Website: http://www.wgs.derbyshire.sch.uk/

Whittington Green School (formerly Meadows Community School) is a mixed secondary school located in Old Whittington, Chesterfield in the English county of Derbyshire.

It is a community school administered by Derbyshire County Council, and offers GCSEs, BTECs and ASDAN courses as programmes of study for pupils. It has recently rated as ‘Good’ by Ofsted (February 2023)
