= Netherthorpe School =

Netherthorpe

Location
- Ralph Road; Staveley, Derbyshire, S43 3PU; England
- Coordinates: 53.267644°N 1.338496°W

Information
- Type: Academy
- Motto: Learn, Enjoy, Succeed
- Established: 1572; 454 years ago
- Department for Education URN: 137902 Tables
- Ofsted: Reports
- Chair of Governors: Rachel Swann
- Gender: Coeducational
- Age: 11 to 19
- Enrolment: 1185
- Current House(s): Sitwell, Frecheville, De Rodes
- Website: http://www.netherthorpe.derbyshire.sch.uk/

Netherthorpe School is a non-selective secondary school with academy status based in Staveley in the Chesterfield district of Derbyshire, England.

== History ==
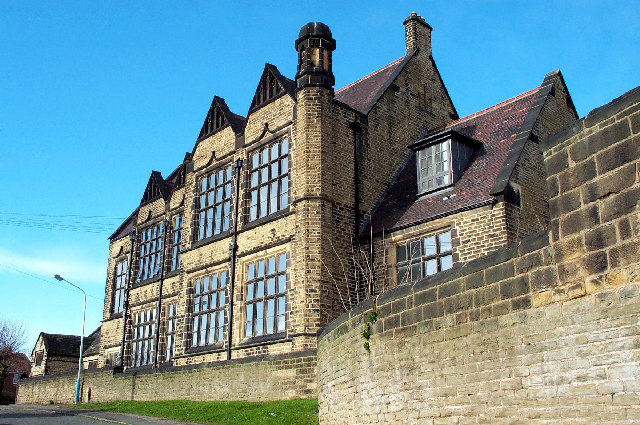
The old school

The school was founded in 1572

A quote from an 1857 directory:

Netherthorpe School.—Francis Rodes, by will, 29th of Elizabeth, left a yearly rent charge of £20 per annum, to be taken forth of his manor of Elmton; £8 thereof to the Grammar school, at Staveley Netherthorpe, £8 for two scholarships in St. John's, Cambridge, and £4 for the relief of soldiers who should be sent to the wars out of Staveley, Barlborough, and Elmton. Robert Sitwell, by will, 41st Elizabeth, gave a messuage in Killamarsh, on trust, to pay £6 yearly to the schoolmaster. Lord James Cavendish, 1742, left a rent charge of £6, issuing out of closes at Hollingwood, for the maintenance of the schoolmaster. In addition to these, the Rev. Francis Gisborne gave £10, to be invested in stock. The income of the various benefactions amounts to £29 per annum. All the sons of parishioners are considered as entitled to classical instruction; but the master makes his own charge for other branches.

The school was known as Netherthorpe Grammar School. From the 1980s until 1999, it was a grant-maintained school, and became a foundation school. Today it is an academy. The school has undergone refurbishment under the BSF Building Schools for the Future scheme and a range of new purpose built facilities opened in September 2012. On 9 July 2013 the Duke of Devonshire officially opened the new areas of the school.

== Debating Society ==
There is a Senior Debating Society that has run for ninety-nine years. Netherthorpe School are the current holders of the Derbyshire Debating Trophy.

== Academic performance ==
In 2011, the percentage of students attaining 5 or more higher-grade GCSE passes including English and Maths was 62.4%. A level results were similarly above average.

== Notable former pupils ==
- Nick Ainger (1961–8) – Labour MP for Carmarthen West
- Peter Hudson – UK Rear-Admiral, – Commander of the United Kingdom Maritime Force (June 2009 – January 2011); Operational Commander – EU Naval Force for Counter Piracy (June 2009 – January 2011)
- Sir Charles Sykes, FRS (1905–1982) - Physicist and metallurgist. Managing Director of Thomas Firth and John Brown Ltd and President of the Institute of Physics.
- Stan Worthington (1905–1973) – Derbyshire and England Test cricketer
- Ben Slater (born 1991) Nottinghamshire Cricketer
- Liam Pitchford (born 1993) British table tennis player
