= Barrow Hill, Derbyshire =

Village in Derbyshire north-east of the town of Chesterfield

Coordinates: 53.274°N 1.377°W

Barrow Hill
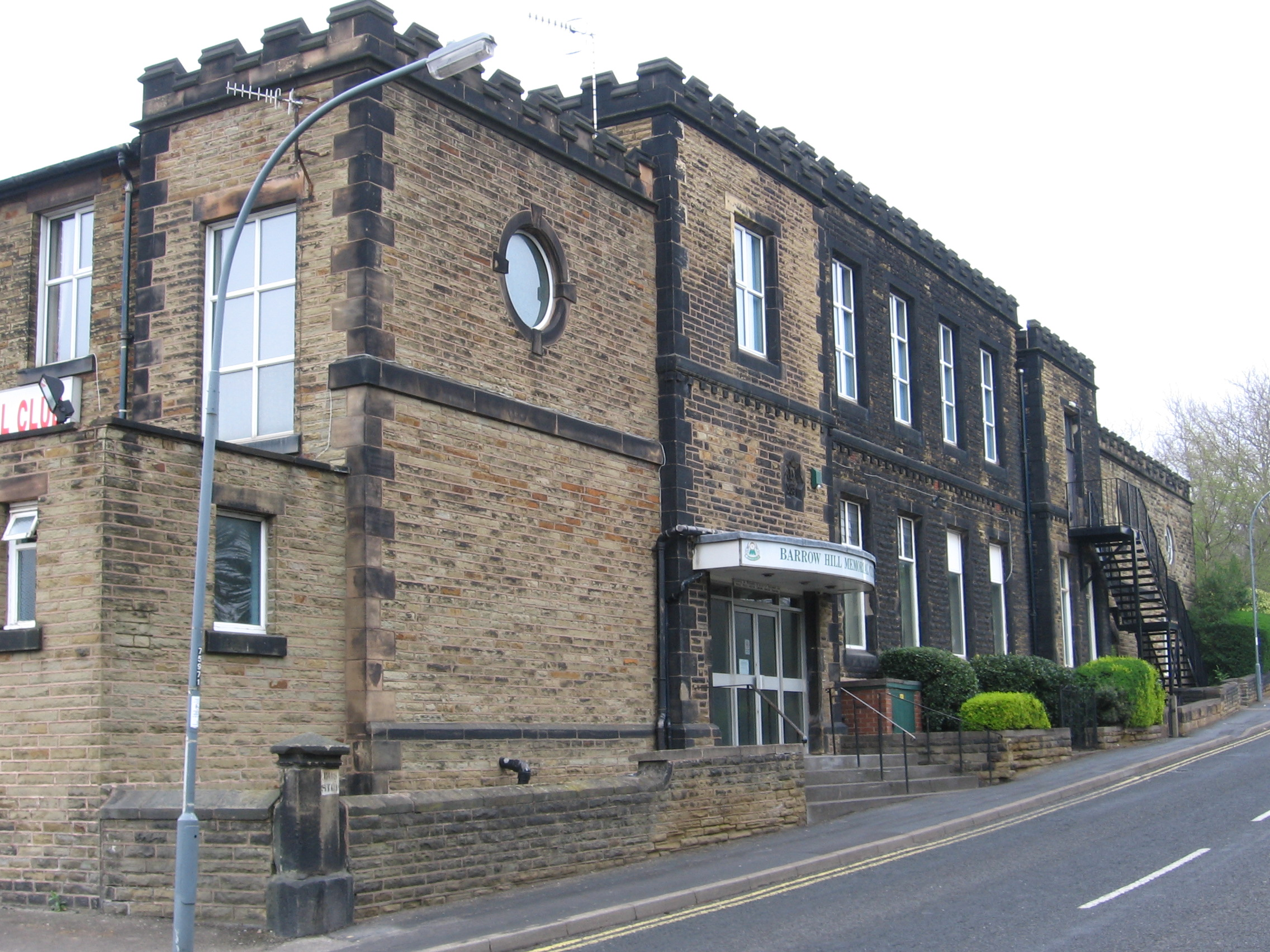
- Barrow Hill Memorial Hall

- Location within Derbyshire
- OS grid reference: SK4175
- District: Chesterfield
- Shire county: Derbyshire
- Region: East Midlands
- Country: England
- Sovereign state: United Kingdom
- Post town: Chesterfield
- Postcode district: S43
- Dialling code: 01246
- Police: Derbyshire
- Fire: Derbyshire
- Ambulance: East Midlands
- UK Parliament: North East Derbyshire

Barrow Hill is a village in Derbyshire, England, north-east of Chesterfield in the civil parish of Staveley. It was formerly the site of Barrow Hill railway station, and now Barrow Hill Engine Shed.

It is the local authority ward of Barrow Hill and New Whittington, which in 2011 had a population of 5,903.
