= Nutbrook Cricket Club =

English Cricket Club, based in Derbyshire

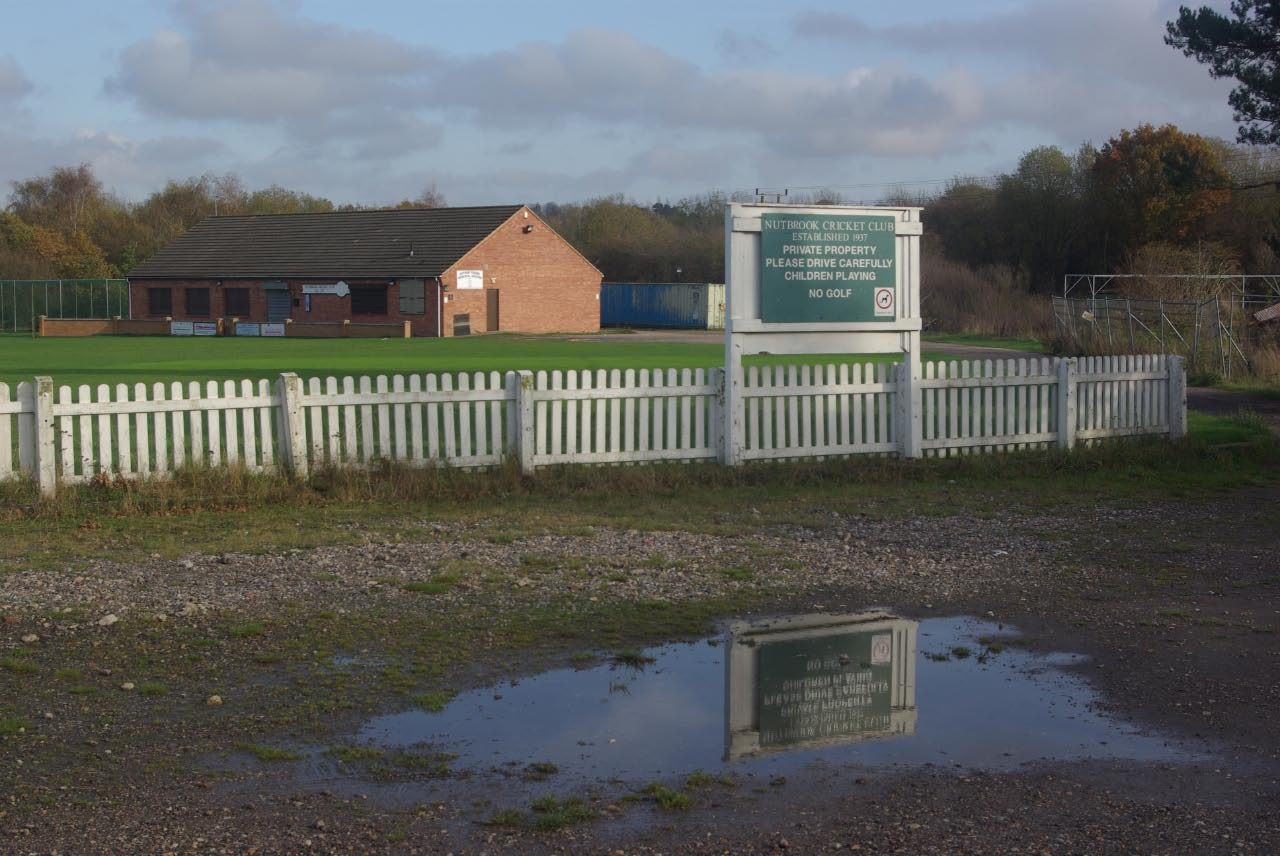
- Nutbrook Cricket Club (2011)
- League: Derbyshire County Cricket League

Team information
- Founded: 1937
- Home ground: Arthur Fisher Memorial Ground, High Lane East

History
- Div 2 wins: 2
- Div 3 wins: 1
- Official website: Nutbrook Cricket Club

Nutbrook Cricket Club is an amateur cricket club on the eastern boundary of West Hallam, Derbyshire, England. The club has a history dating back to 1937.

== Ground ==
The home ground is located on Arthur Fisher Memorial Ground, High Lane East, West Hallam and has two pitches and two all-weather nets. The 1st and 2nd XI teams use the main pitch 'Arthur Fisher Memorial Ground', rated by the DCCL as a Grade A ground; the 3rd and Junior teams use the 'Nutbrook Sports Ground' in the bottom corner the left of the pavilion as you enter the ground, rated as a Grade C ground.

== History ==
Nutbrook Cricket Club was founded in 1937 but had a peripatetic existence with regards to grounds to start with. The original ground was on The Ropewalk at the bottom end of Station Road in Ilkeston. The club then played at the Bridge Street ground in Cotmanhay in the 1950s, followed by the Shipley Boat in the 1960s. By the early 1970s, the club moved to Pavilion Road on the Cotmanhay Farm Estate on the edge of Ilkeston. In 1985 the club moved to their present ground, leasing a pitch from the East Midlands Electricity Board Social Club off High Lane East, West Hallam. The club purchased the 10 acre ground from Powergen in 2000.

Prior to the 1990s all cricket played by Nutbrook were friendly matches. In 1991 a Junior Team was formed and in 1994 the club entered Division 4C of the Derbyshire County League. 1995 saw the formation of a second team, followed by a third team in 1996. Success followed quickly and since joining the league the club has been Division Champions on 11 occasions.

The Club currently has 3 senior teams competing in the Derbyshire County Cricket League and a junior training section that play competitive cricket in the Erewash Young Cricketers League.

== Club Performance ==
The Derbyshire County Cricket League competition results showing the club's positions in the league (by Division) since 2001.

- Key
  | Gold | Champions |
  | Red | Relegated |
  | Grey | League Suspended |
- cont...
  | 1 | Division 1 |
  | 2 | Division 2 |
  | 3 | Division 3, etc. |
- cont...
  | N | North |
  | S | South |
  | E | East |
  | C | Central |

Derbyshire County Cricket League
| Team | 2001 | 2002 | 2003 | 2004 | 2005 | 2006 | 2007 | 2008 | 2009 | 2010 | 2011 | 2012 | 2013 | 2014 | 2015 | 2016 | 2017 | 2018 | 2019 | 2020 | 2021 | 2022 | 2023 | 2024 | 2025 | 2026 |
|---|---|---|---|---|---|---|---|---|---|---|---|---|---|---|---|---|---|---|---|---|---|---|---|---|---|---|
| 1st XI | 1 | 1 | 2 | 2 | 2 | 1 | 1 | 1 | 2 | 2 | 2 | 2 | 2 | 2 | 2 | 1 | 1 | 2 | 2 | 3NS | 3N | 3N | 3N | 4N | 4N | 4N |
| 2nd XI | 4C | 4C | 5S | 5S | 6S | 5S | 4S | 4S | 6S | 6S | 6S | 6N | 6N | 6N | 6N | 6N | 6N | 6N | 6N | 6NE | 6N | 6N | 5N | 6N | 6N | 5N |
| 3rd XI | 5B | 5B | 7C | 7C | 7C | 7C | 6C | 7E | 9N | 9N | 9N | 9N | 9N | 9N | 9N | 10N | 9N | 9N | 9E | 9E | 9CS | 9CS | 9S | 10E | 10C | 9C |

== Club Honours ==
- Derbyshire County Cricket League
  | Division 2 | Champions | 2005, 2015 |
  | Division 3 | Champions | 2000 (Note: Division 3A.) |
  | Division 4 | Champions | 1995, (Note: Division 4C.) 1996, (Note: Division 4B.) 2002 |
  | Division 5 | Champions | 1999, (Note: Division 5B.) 2002 |
  | Division 6 | Champions | 2005 (Note: Division 6S.) |
  | Division 7 | Champions | 1996 |
  | Division 8 | Champions | 1995 |
- DCCL - Cup Competitions
  | Winners | Bayley Cup | 2021 |
  | Winners | Wright Cup | 1998, 2010 |
- Mayor of Derby Charity Cup Competitions
  | Winners | Butterley Cup | 2009 |

== See also ==
- Club cricket
