= Ilkeston Rutland Cricket Club =

English Cricket Club, based in Derbyshire

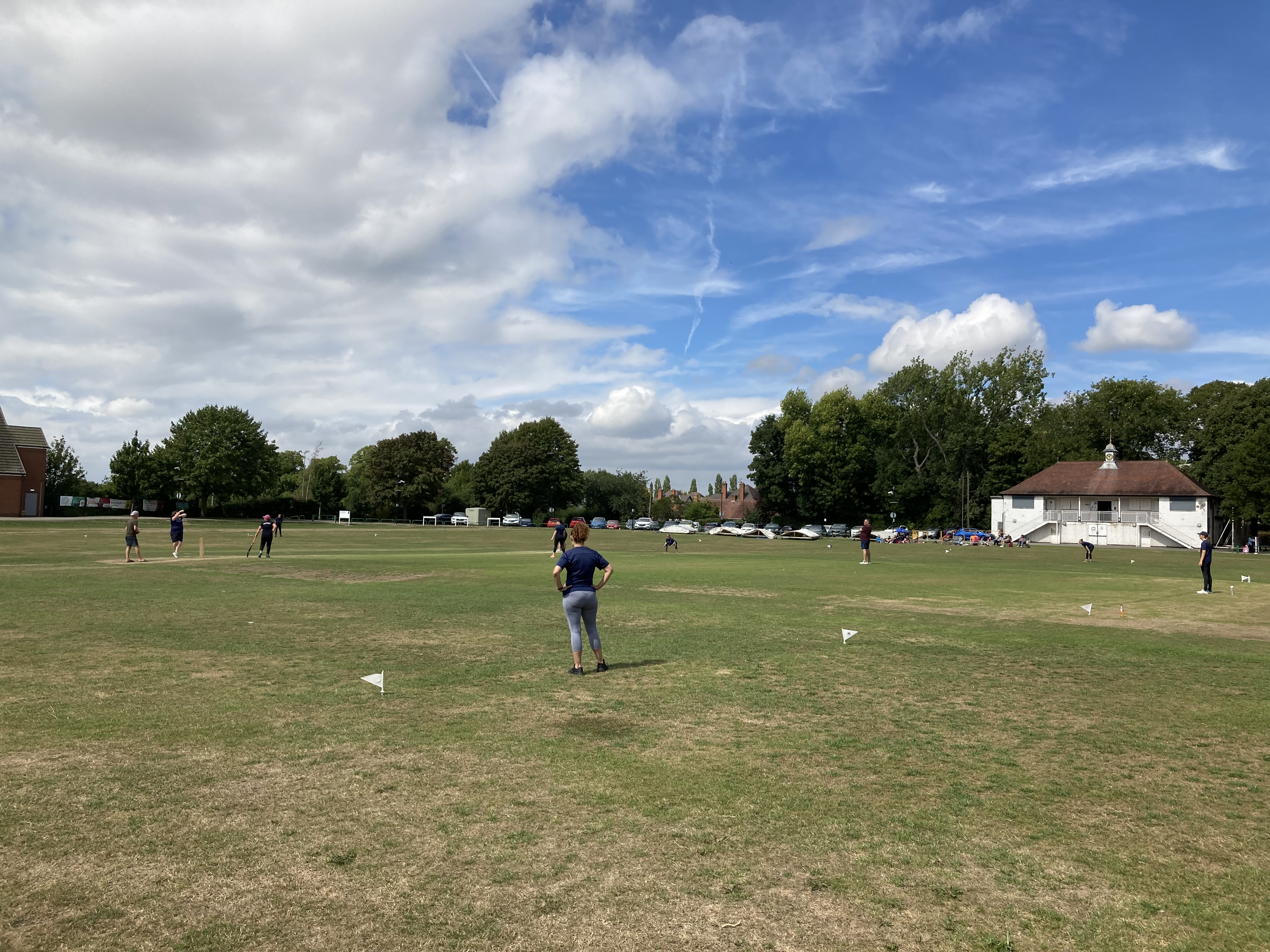
- Rutland Sports Park (2022)
- League: Derbyshire County Cricket League

Team information
- Founded: 1824
- Home ground: Rutland Sports Park, Ilkeston

History
- Div 1 wins: 1
- Div 2 wins: 3
- Official website: Ilkeston Rutland Cricket Club

Ilkeston Rutland Cricket Club is an amateur cricket club based in Ilkeston, Derbyshire, England. The club has a history dating back to 1824.

== Ground ==
Ilkeston Rutland's main ground is the Rutland Sports Park, on Oakwell Drive in Ilkeston which includes a two lane, all-weather net facility. Their second ground is at The Stute on Hallam Field Road. The 1st and 2nd XI teams use the Rutland Sports Park pitch, rated by the DCCL as a Grade A+ ground, and the 3rd and 4th XI use the pitch on The Stute, rated as a Grade B ground. Their main ground (Rutland Sports Park) has a proud history of annually hosting 1st Class recreation matches between 1925 – 1994. In 1977, the ground hosted Derbyshire's Gillette Cup quarter-final tie against a Somerset side which included Ian Botham, Viv Richards and Joel Garner, when on an extremely hot day, 11,000 spectators packed into the ground.

== History ==
Ilkeston Rutland Cricket Club was formed in 1829, and led a peripatetic existence for its first 100 years. The earliest known record of a cricket ground for Ilkeston was a field near to Lawn Cottage, Pimlico, donated by the Duke of Rutland. A few years later a ground to the south of St. Mary's churchyard was made available, known as the Old Cricket Ground. By 1876, the club relocated to a new ground on land also loaned by the Duke of Rutland on the understanding that the local authority would develop it into a recreation ground. However, the ground quality at this stage was so poor that turf had to be lifted and transported from the Old Cricket Ground. Ilkeston Rutland Cricket Club was one of the founder members of the Derbyshire League in 1890. The club then joined the Ilkeston & District League, and won in 1909. In 1914 George V visited Ilkeston and the land was finally passed to the authority and the ground extended. The cricket ground was prepared to county match standards and officially opened as the Rutland Recreation Ground on Wednesday 6 May 1925. Ilkeston Rutland Cricket Club tendered to use the ground and started to use it the following year. Derbyshire played the first match there later that summer, and continued to do so until 1994. After a break during the Second World War, the club was revived in 1947. By 1978 the club started off the club's junior section. In 1982, the club amalgamated with the Ilkeston Casuals, winning the O J Jackson Cup the same year, and in 2017, the club amalgamated with the Stanton Elks, originally called the Stanton & Awsworth Elks Cricket Club.

The Club currently has 4 senior teams competing in the Derbyshire County Cricket League, a women's softball team in the East Midlands Women's Cricket League and a long established junior section that compete in the Derbyshire Junior Cricket League.

== Club performance ==
The Derbyshire County Cricket League competition results showing the club's positions in the league (by Division) since 2002.

- Key
  Gold	Champions
  Red	Relegated
  Grey	League suspended
- cont...
  P	ECB Premier League
  1	Division 1
  2	Division 2
  3	Division 3, etc.
- cont...
  N	North
  S	South
  E	East
  C	Central

Derbyshire County Cricket League
Team	2002	2003	2004	2005	2006	2007	2008	2009	2010	2011	2012	2013	2014	2015	2016	2017	2018	2019	2020	2021	2022	2023	2024	2025	2026
1st XI	P	P	P	P	P	1	P	P	P	P	1	1	1	1	1	2	1	1	1N	1	1	1	1	1	1
2nd XI	3C	3N	3N	3N	3N	3N	3N	4N	4N	4N	4N	4N	5N	6S	6S	5N	5N	4N	4NS	4N	3N	4N	5N	5N	5N
3rd XI	5A	7C	6N	6N	6C	6C	7E	8N	8N	8N	9N	9N	9N	9N	10N	7N	7N	7N	7NS	7S	7S	7N	7N	7N	7N
4th XI																9N	10EC	9E		9CS	9CS	10C	10E	10C	10C

== Club honours ==
- Derbyshire County Cricket League
  Division 1	Champions	1994
  Division 2	Champions	1982, 1993, 2017
  Division 5	Champions	2001, (Note: Division 5A.) 2018 (Note: Division 5 (North).)
  Division 7	Champions	1988
- DCCL – Cup Competitions
  Winners	Derbyshire Cup	1994
  Winners	Derbyshire Plate Final	1994
- Mayor of Derby Charity Cup Competitions
  Winners	OJ Jackson Cup	1982, 1994, 2018
  Winners	Butterley Cup	2017

== Ircc on film ==
- Featuring Ilkeston Rutland CC ground and facilities
- Ilkeston Rutland CC 'tp365' Cricket Practice Facility
- History of Derbyshire County Cricket Club featuring Rutland Sports Park

== See also ==
- Club cricket
