= King Ludd =

King Ludd may refer to:

- King Lud, legendary 1st-century BCE founder of London
- Ned Ludd, leader of the 19th-century Luddites
