= West Hallam White Rose Cricket Club =

English Cricket Club, based in Derbyshire

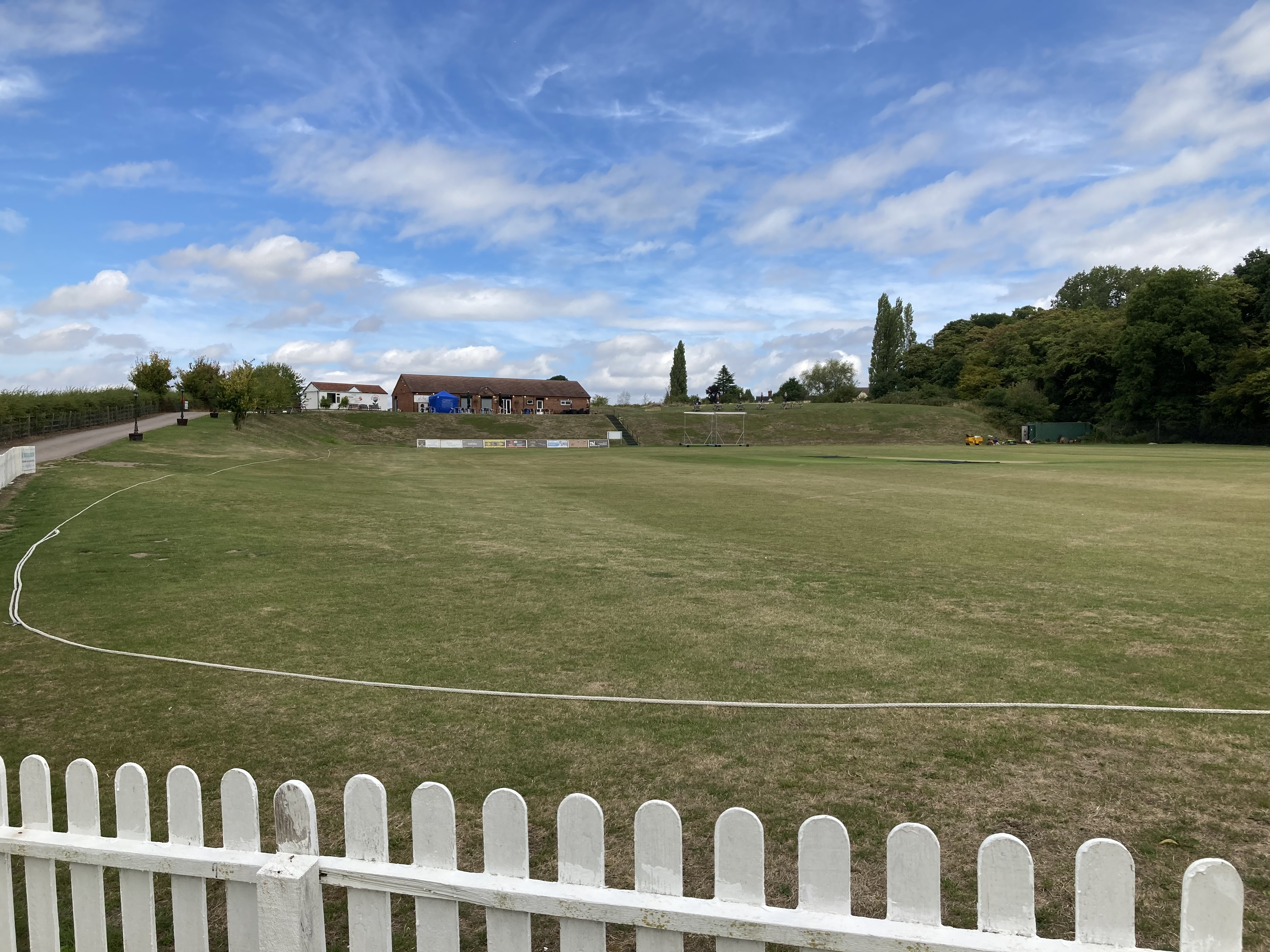
- The Statham Oval (2022)
- League: Derbyshire County Cricket League

Team information
- Founded: 1880
- Home ground: The Statham Oval, Cat and Fiddle lane

History
- Div 1 wins: 1
- Div 2 wins: 0
- Official website: West Hallam White Rose Cricket Club

West Hallam White Rose Cricket Club is an amateur cricket club on the southern edge of West Hallam, Derbyshire, England. The club has a history dating back to 1880.

== Ground ==
The home ground is located on The Statham Oval (Cock Orchard) off Cat and Fiddle Lane West Hallam and the ground is rated by the DCCL as a Grade A ground.

== History ==
The origins of the club date to the mid 19th century. Newspaper reports have been found recording cricket matches played by "West Hallam Cricket Club" in the grounds of the Squire Hall, off Cock Orchard in 1851. By 1871, the Hall was demolished and the club had to rent land from a local farmer, whose farm stood on the junction of The Village (street) and School Square. "Hallam White Rose Cricket Club" appeared on record in 1880. The addition of the 'White Rose' is said to be based on the white rose bushes in the gardens of the old Squire Hall. It is not known when the club moved to a recreation ground on Beech Lane, but after the Second World War, the Club played on a field off St. Wilfrid's Road until 1950, when they returned to what became Powtrell Community Pavilion Court on Beech Lane. The Club won the Butterley Cup in 1962, a couple of years before joining the Notts & Derbyshire Border League in 1964 (which is now the Derbyshire County Cricket League); prior to this they mainly focused on playing friendly matches. By 2001, they became Division 1 League Champions and by 2007 they finally moved back to Cock Orchard off the Cat and Fiddle Lane, and officially opened their new home now known as The Statham Oval in 2011.

The Club currently have two senior teams competing in the Derbyshire County Cricket League, a junior training section that play competitive cricket in the Erewash Young Cricketers League and the Club are regulars in the Derbyshire Cricket Board Indoor Competition.

== Club performance ==
The Derbyshire County Cricket League competition results showing the club's positions in the league (by Division) since 2001.

Key
Gold	Champions
Red	Relegated
Grey	League suspended
1	Division 1
2	Division 2
3	Division 3
4	Division 4, etc.
N	North
S	South
E	East
C	Central

Derbyshire County Cricket League
Team	2001	2002	2003	2004	2005	2006	2007	2008	2009	2010	2011	2012	2013	2014	2015	2016	2017	2018	2019	2020	2021	2022	2023	2024	2025	2026
1st XI	1	1	1	1	2	2S	2S	3S	3	4N	4N	4N	3	2	2	2	6N	5N	4N	3NS	3N	2	3N	4N	3N	3S
2nd XI	4A	4A	4N	5N	5N	5N	6C	5N	6S	6S	7N	6N	6N	6N	6N	6N	10S	9N	8N	8NS	8N	8N	8N	8S	8S	9C
3rd XI	5A	4E	6N	6N	6N	6C	7E	6C	9N	9N	9N	9N	9N	9N	10N	10S										

== Club honours ==
Derbyshire County Cricket League
Division 1	Champions	2001
Division 3	Champions	2008, (Note: Division 3S) 2013, 2021 (Note: Division 3N)
Division 4	Champions	1986, 2012, (Note: Division 4N) 2019
Division 5	Champions	1978, 1980, 1984
Division 6	Champions	2007, (Note: Division 6C) 2017 (Note: Division 6N)
Division 7	Champions	2011 (Note: Division 7N)
Division 10	Champions	2017 (Note: Division 10S)

DCCL - Cup Competitions
Winners	Bayley Cup	2013

Mayor of Derby Charity Cup Competitions
Winners	Butterley Cup	1962, 1975, 2012, 2013, 2015
Winners	OJ Jackson Cup	1978, 1981

Derbyshire Cricket Board Indoor Competition
Division 1	Champions	2017, 2018

== The Club on film ==
- West Hallam White Rose Cricket Club Memories.
- Harry Porter, Ken Parish and Dick Owen discuss their cricketing memories at West Hallam WRCC.
- John Burton, Dave Cooper and Mick Brown discuss the origins of their cricket club, and much more.
- Ken Parish and Dave Cooper chat about their cricket club in this short recording.

== See also ==
- Club cricket
