= Ned Ludd =

Fictional figurehead of the Luddites

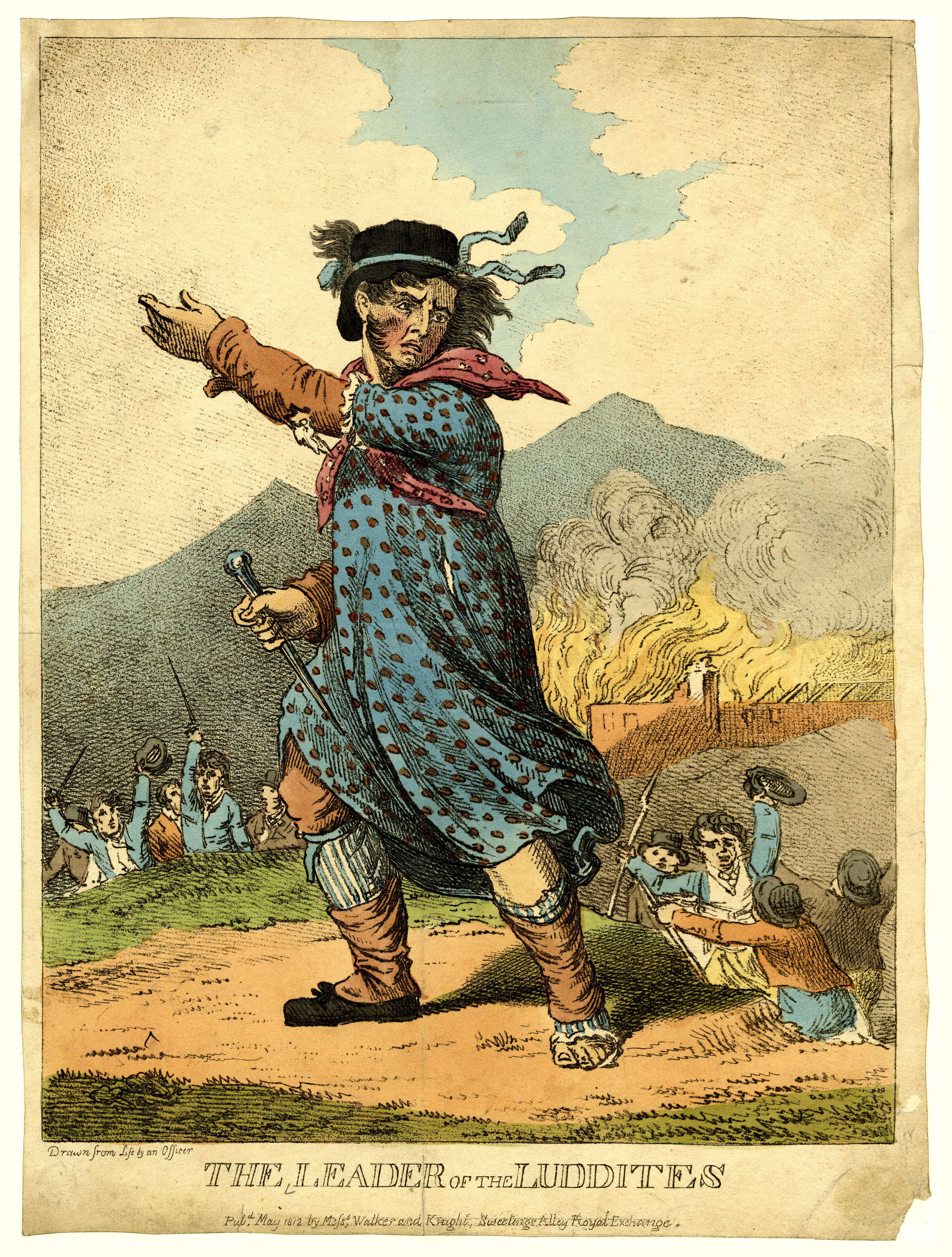
Engraving of Ned Ludd, The Leader of the Luddites, 1812

Ned Ludd (sometimes referred to as Ned Lud, among other names) is the legendary, fictitious person to whom the Luddites in England attributed the name of their movement.

In 1779, Ludd is supposed to have broken two stocking frames in a fit of rage. When the Luddites emerged in the 1810s, his identity was quickly appropriated to become the folkloric character of Captain Ludd, also known as King Ludd or General Ludd, the Luddites' alleged leader and founder.

== History ==
According to the legend, Ludd was a weaver from Anstey, near Leicester, England. In 1779, after either being whipped for idleness or taunted by local youths, he smashed two knitting frames in what was described as a "fit of passion". This story can be traced to an article in The Nottingham Review on 20 December 1811, but there is no independent evidence of its veracity. John Blackner's book History of Nottingham, also published in 1811, provides a variant tale, of a boy called "Ludlam" who was told by his father, a framework-knitter, to "square his needles". Ludlam took a hammer and "beat them into a heap". News of the incident spread, and whenever frames were sabotaged, people would jokingly say "Ned Ludd did it".

By 1812, organised frame-breakers became known as Luddites, using the name King Ludd or Captain Ludd for their fictitious leader. Letters and proclamations from the Luddites were signed by "Ned Ludd". The surname "Ludd" was sometimes shortened in these writings to just "Lud".

== See also ==
- Captain Swing
- Rebecca Riots
- Luddites
