= Listed buildings in West Hallam =

West Hallam is a civil parish in the Borough of Erewash in Derbyshire, England. The parish contains six listed buildings that are recorded in the National Heritage List for England. Of these, one is listed at Grade II*, the middle of the three grades, and the others are at Grade II, the lowest grade. The parish contains the village of West Hallam and the surrounding area. All the listed buildings are in the village, and consist of a church, two schools later used for other purposes, a pair of cottages, a war memorial, and a bottle kiln from a former pottery.

== Key ==
Grade	Criteria
II*	Particularly important buildings of more than special interest
II	Buildings of national importance and special interest

== Buildings ==
Name and location	Photograph	Date	Notes	Grade
St Wilfrid's Church; 52.96570°N 1.35798°W		14th century	The church has been altered and extended during the centuries, and it was restored in 1854–55. It is built in gritstone with a Welsh slate roof, and consists of a nave with a clerestory, north and south aisles, a north porch, a chancel and a west tower. The tower has two stages, with diagonal buttresses, a west doorway with a moulded surround, above which is a three-light Perpendicular window with a depressed four-centred arch and an embattled transom. In the upper stage are two-light bell openings with Y-tracery, and a clock face on the north side, above which are corner gargoyles and embattled parapets.	II*
The Old School; 52.96644°N 1.35953°W		1832	The school, later converted into two cottages, is in red brick on a chamfered plinth, with stone dressings, and a tile roof with stone coped gables and moulded kneelers. There is a range of a single storey with four bays, and a two-storey projecting bay on the right, the former master's house. On the front is a gabled porch with a Tudor arched entrance and a hood mould, and a doorway with a fanlight, above which are two inscribed panels. The windows are mullioned with hood moulds.	II
Cinder Cottage and Ye Olde Cinder House; 52.97010°N 1.36909°W		1833	A pair of estate cottages in brick, faced in cinder or clinker, with stone dressings, quoins and a tile roof, the gables with decorative pierced bargeboards and finials. There are two storeys and an unequal T-shaped plan. The porch is gabled and has timber cladding, and the doorway and windows are in Gothic style. In a gable are initials and the date in orange cinder.	II
Village Hall; 52.96655°N 1.35806°W		1852	A school, later the village hall, it is in red brick on a chamfered stone plinth, with blue brick diapering, gritstone dressings, quoins, and a tile roof with stone coped gables. Thee is a single storey and a front of three bays, the right bay projecting and gabled, containing a two-light mullioned window and a single-light window above. In the angle is a square porch containing a Tudor arched doorway with a chamfered surround, above which is a stone plaque and a coped parapet. To the left are two mullioned and transomed windows in gabled half-dormers, between which is a projecting chimney breast. To the north are low coped walls with railings.	II
War memorial 52.96656°N 1.35768°W		1921	The war memorial is in sandstone, and consists of a tall chest tomb with a moulded cornice on three steps, with an inscription. On the sides of the chest are white marble plaques with the names of those lost in the First World War. On top of it is a marble statue depicting two soldiers manning a machine gun on which are oak leaves, and along the bottom is an inscription. Leaning across the steps is a stone wreath flanked by panels inscribed with the names of those lost in the Second World War.	II
Bottle kiln 52.97419°N 1.35401°W		1922	The bottle kiln from a former pottery, later incorporated into a house and craft centre, it is red brick, with only the outer skin surviving. The bottom third is vertical, and it contains round-arched entrances, and round-arched and square openings. Above is a row of socket holes and metal straps. The curving upper part ends in a decorative brick band, and the top is moulded.	II
