= West Hallam =

Village in Derbyshire, England

Coordinates: 52.97°N 1.36°W

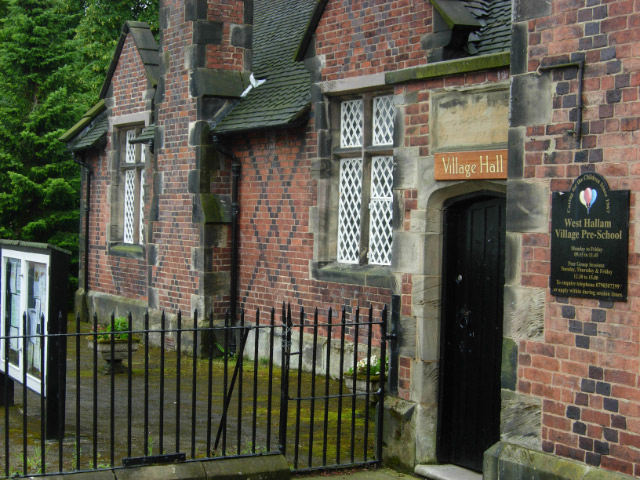
- The Village Hall, West Hallam.

- Location within Derbyshire
- Population: 4,686 (2011 census)
- OS grid reference: SK430415
- District: Erewash
- Shire county: Derbyshire
- Region: East Midlands
- Country: England
- Sovereign state: United Kingdom
- Post town: Ilkeston
- Postcode district: DE7
- Dialling code: 0115
- Police: Derbyshire
- Fire: Derbyshire
- Ambulance: East Midlands
- UK Parliament: Mid Derbyshire

West Hallam is a large village and civil parish west of Ilkeston in the county of Derbyshire in the East Midlands region of England. West Hallam has had its own parish council since 1894 and, since 1974, has been part of the Erewash borough. The population of the civil parish was 4,829 at the 2001 census reducing to 4,686 at the 2011 census.

== Early history ==
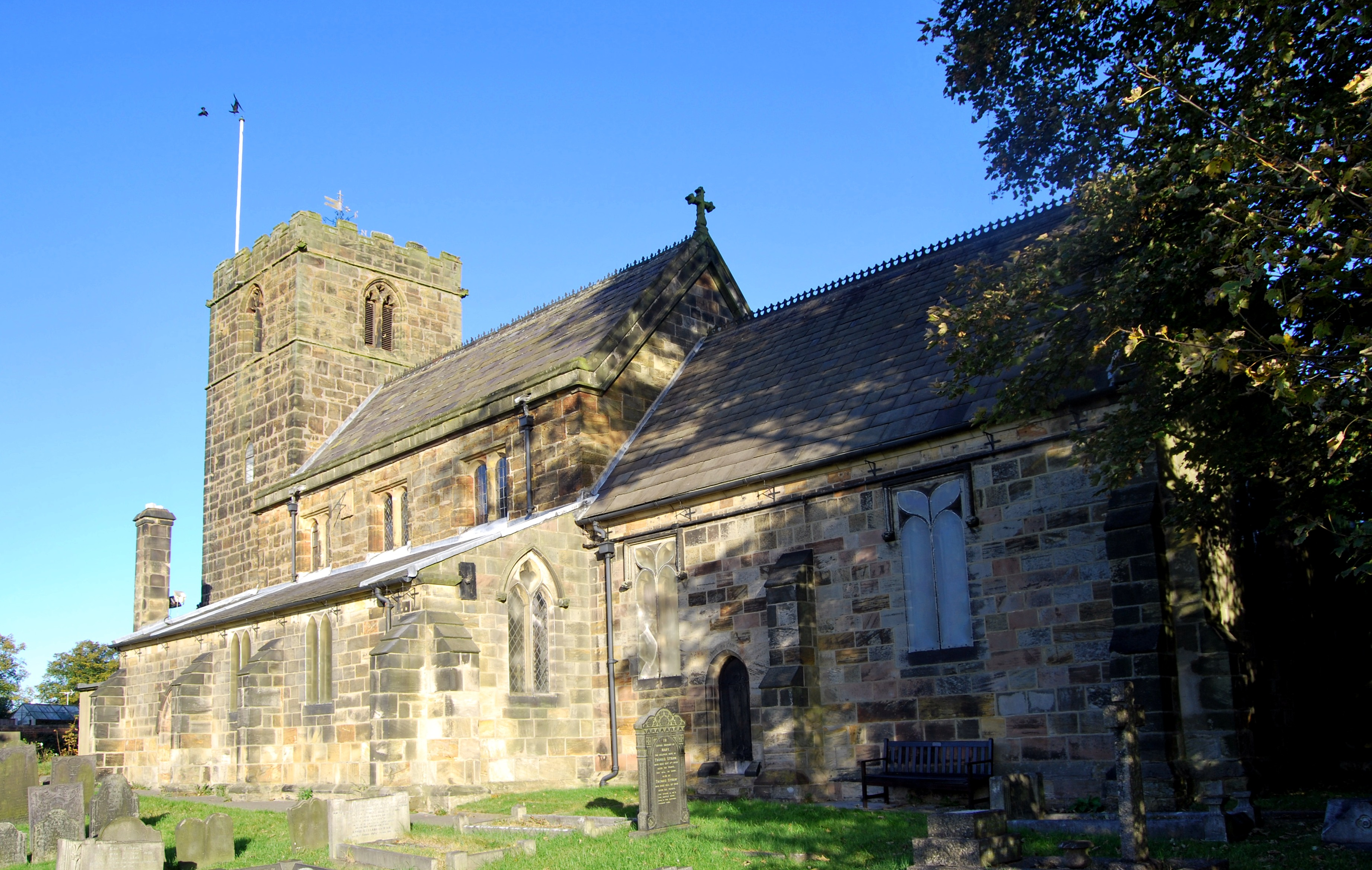
St Wilfrid's Parish Church

Although it is not known exactly when the village was founded, it existed at the time of the Domesday Book in 1086. St Wilfrid's Church is over 700 years old. In the 16th and 17th centuries, West Hallam had a reputation for Catholic sympathies at a time when Catholics were persecuted.

Until the early 20th century West Hallam was a small rural village and the property of the Newdigate family. Most jobs were in the agricultural area with mining work locally in the Erewash Valley coalfield. There was also a West Hallam railway station, connected to the Great Northern Railway and Derby Friargate Station.

== Twentieth century ==
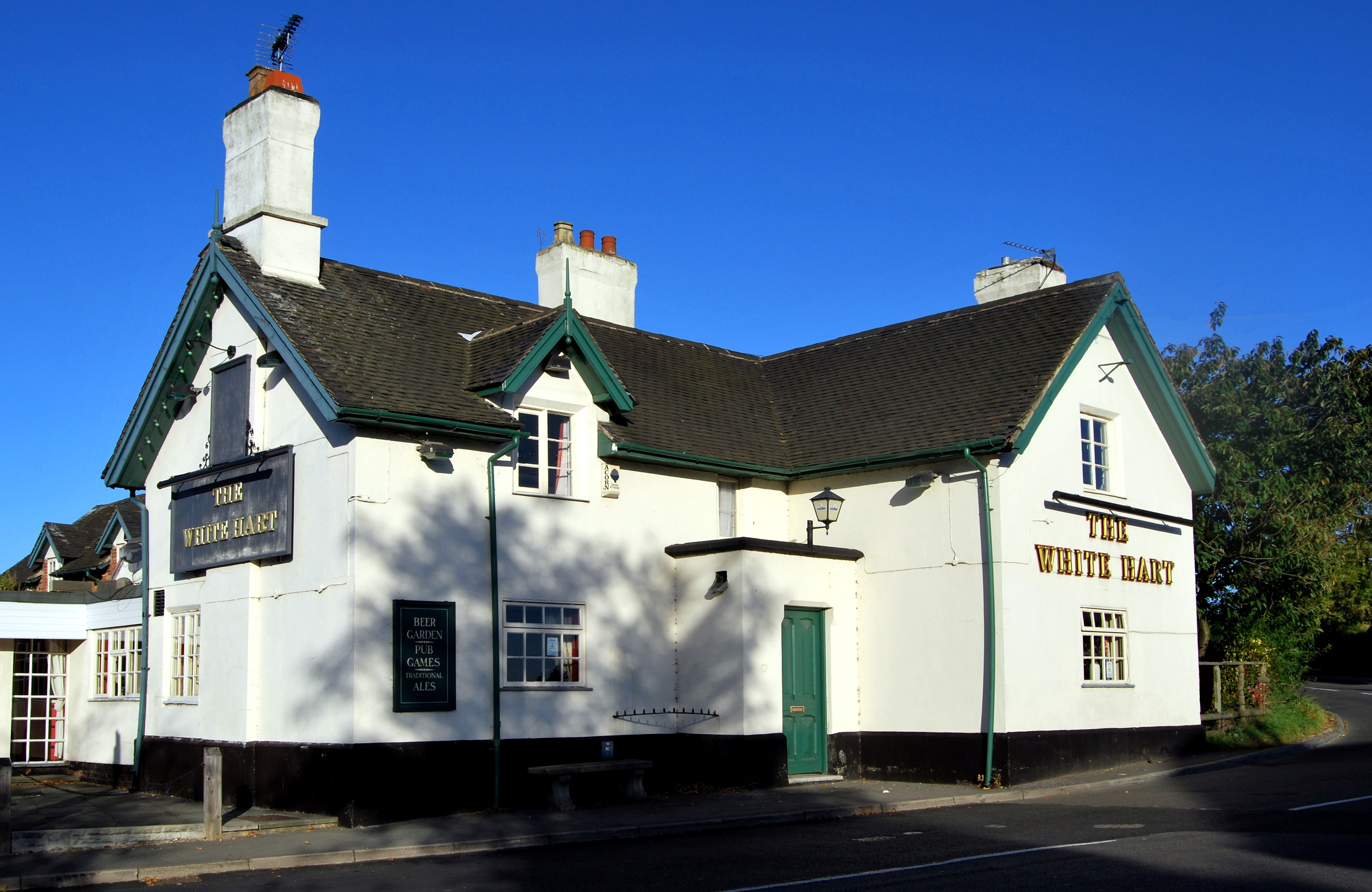
The White Hart

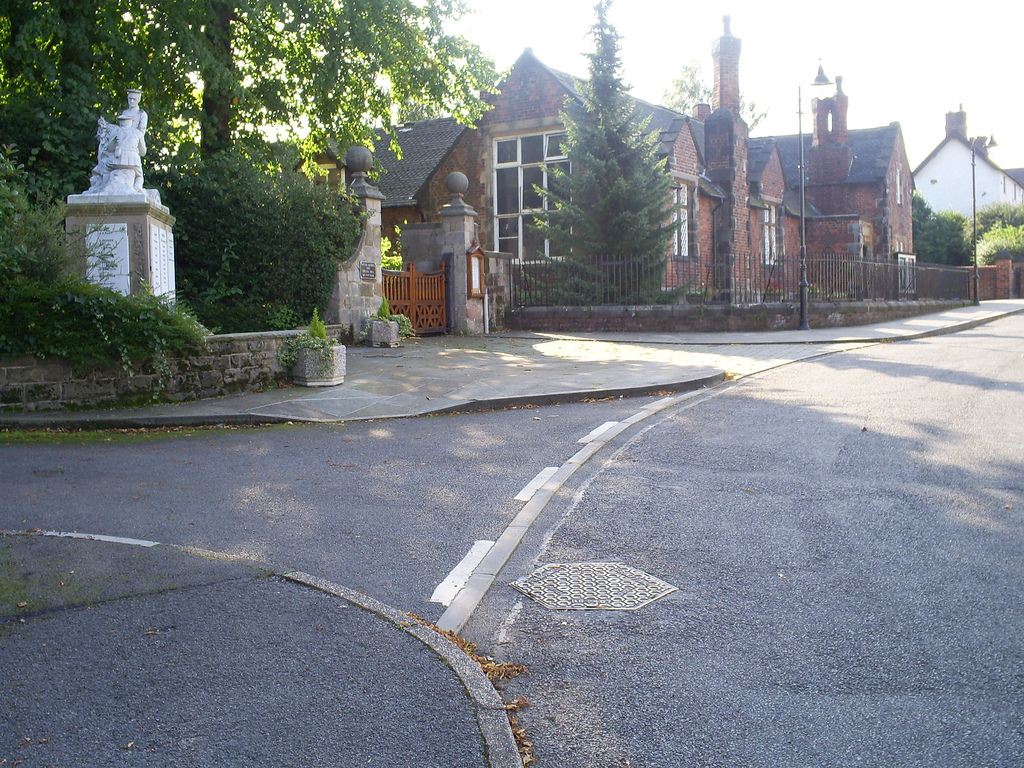
The Village

The Newdigate family finally parted with their interest as Lords of the Manor in 1914.

The later 20th century saw rapid change, with both the collieries and the railway disappearing during the 1960s. Stanley Colliery (known locally as 'Nibby Pit') on Station Road was the last to close in 1959 and some buildings remain, now in industrial use. The railway station is now Station House, a private residence.

The colliery spoil tips were removed and landscaped and after much opencast coal extraction the area regained its traditional rural appeal from the 1970s onward. In the 1970s and 1980s a major new housing development dramatically increased the village's population.

The former Second World War Army Ordnance Depot off Cat and Fiddle Lane to the south of the village was reopened in the 1960s as Midland Storage (now known as TDG Pinnacle) and remains a significant local employer.

Most residents are now employed away from West Hallam, some even commuting daily as far as London.

== Amenities ==
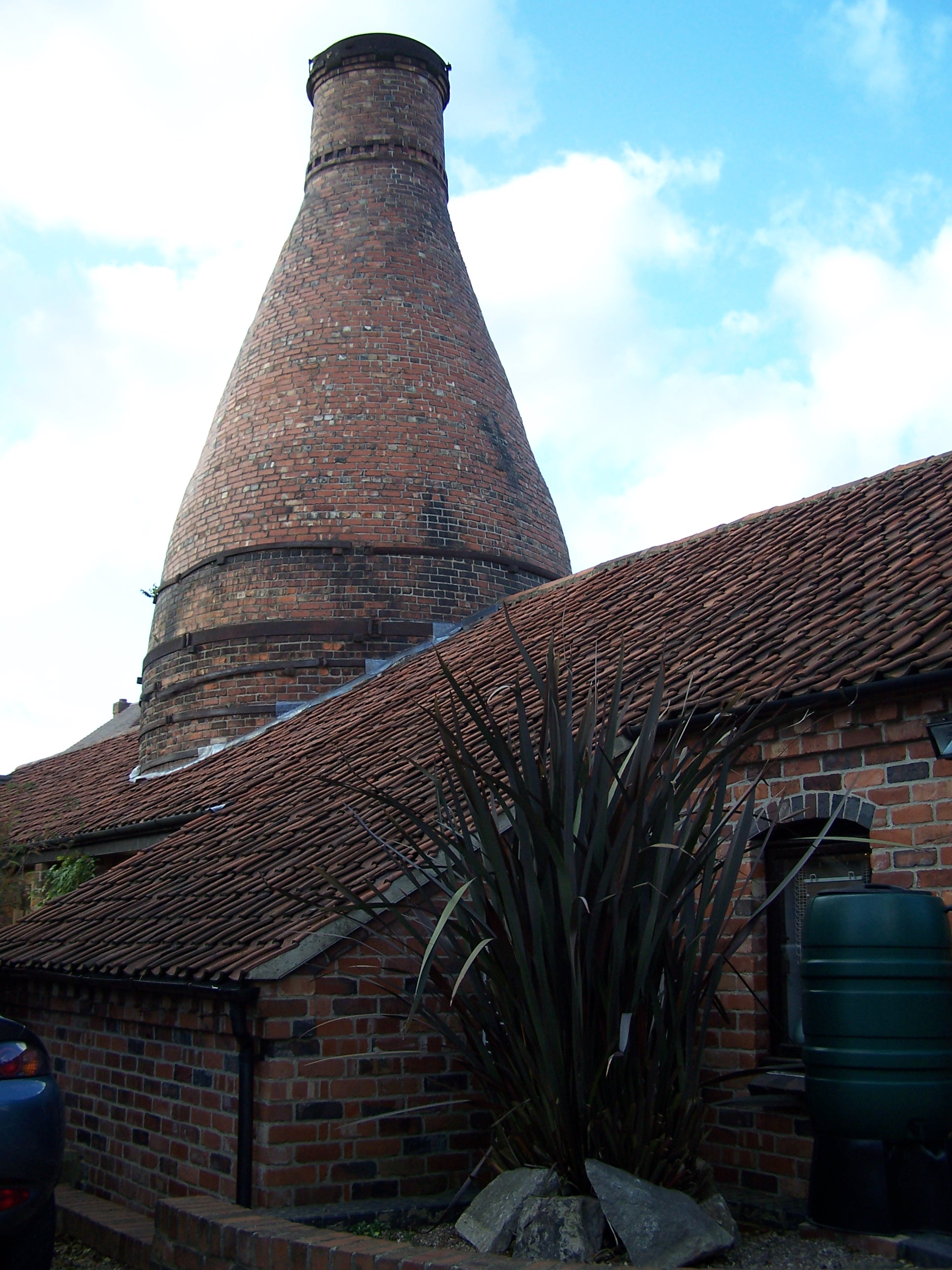
The Bottle Kiln

One of present-day West Hallam's more notable places is the Bottle Kiln. On the site of the former West Hallam Pottery – which once had two such kilns and was virtually derelict for many years – this well-renovated bottle kiln and supporting buildings now houses an art and crafts gallery, a café and a Japanese-style tea garden and gift shop.

A valuable open space is the recreational area at Straw's Bridge (also known as Swan Lake) on West Hallam's eastern border, on the A609, with Ilkeston. This popular lake and walking area was formed from a flood meadow and the site of the old West Hallam Sewage Works in around 1990. This site was opencast mined in the late 1980s and the restored site along with some adjacent land forming part of the Ilkeston area known as 'Manor' or 'Manners Floods' forms the Straw's Bridge area today.

Other facilities include a village hall in The Village, a community centre on Station Road, and Scargill Church of England Primary School on Beech Lane. There is now only one functioning pub, the busy Newdigate (formerly The Newdigate Arms); The 17th-century Punch Bowl closed (perhaps permanently) in 2022 and the White Hart was demolished in August 2020 to make way for four- and five-bedroom houses. The Dales Shopping Centre in The Village includes a Tesco Express Store, chemist, pizzeria, a Chinese and an Indian take-away as well as a fish and chip shop. Two medical centres/doctors surgeries and a chiropractor's practice can also be found there. Four public recreation grounds can also be found within West Hallam.

West Hallam is also well provided as far as local charities are concerned. As well as the Rev John Scargill's charity, established in 1662 and still going strong, needy locals may benefit from the Ann Powtrell Foundation and the West Hallam Trust (West Hallam United Charities), all of which are long established.

== Sport ==
=== Cricket ===
West Hallam has two established cricket clubs:

- West Hallam White Rose Cricket Club was founded in 1880. The club ground is based on The Statham Oval, Cat and Fiddle lane, and they have two senior teams in the Derbyshire County Cricket League, and a well established Junior section playing competitive cricket in the Erewash Young Cricketers League.
- Nutbrook Cricket Club, was founded in 1937. Their ground is situated on the border between West Hallam and Ilkeston, on the Arthur Fisher Memorial Ground, High Lane East. They have three senior teams in the Derbyshire County Cricket League, and a Junior section playing competitive cricket in the Erewash Young Cricketers League.

=== Football ===
- West Hallam Junior Football Club (established 1886 as a senior club) is a football club based at the Powtrell Community Pavilion on Beech Lane Recreation Ground. They operate teams across the various age groups ranging from Development to Under 18s. The junior section of the West Hallam football club came into existence in 1980, but West Hallam no longer has a senior team.

== Notable residents ==
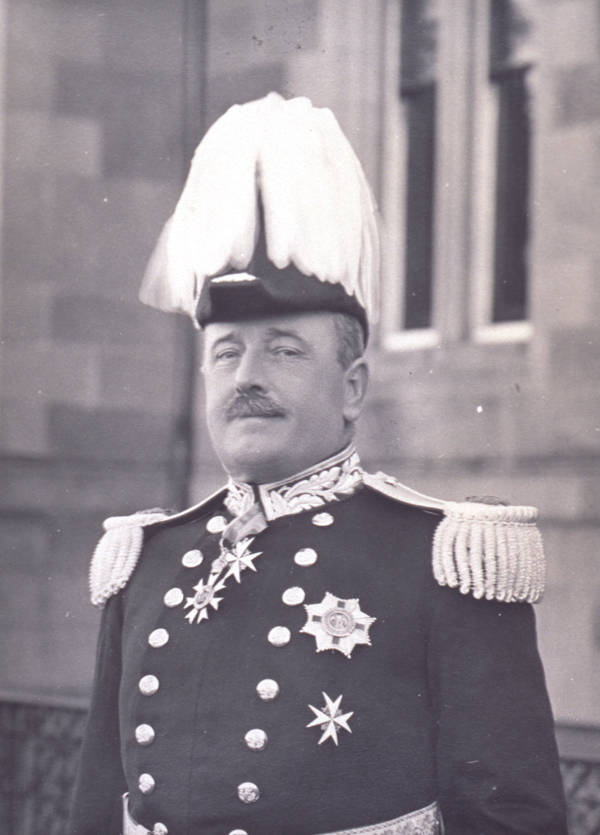
Sir Francis Newdegate, former Lord of the Manor

- Thomas Rossell Potter (1799–1873), writer, was born here.
- Sir Francis Newdegate GCMG KStJ (1862–1936), final Lord of the Manor until 1914. Was Governor of Tasmania (1917–1920) and of Western Australia (1920–1924).

== See also ==
- Listed buildings in West Hallam
- Ye Olde Cinder House
