= Alfred Potter =

English clergyman and cricketer

Alfred Potter (15 December 1827 – 21 September 1878) was an English clergyman and a cricketer who played first-class cricket for Cambridge University in 1849. He was born in Ilkeston, Derbyshire and died at Nottingham.

Potter was educated at St John's College, Cambridge. As a cricketer, he was a tail-end batsman and a bowler; his batting and bowling styles are not known. Playing for Cambridge against the Marylebone Cricket Club, he took five wickets in the MCC second innings, though the complete figures are not recorded. That led to his selection for the 1849 University Match against Oxford University, which Cambridge won narrowly and in which he took two wickets. That was his final game of first-class cricket.

Potter graduated from Cambridge University in 1850 with a Bachelor of Arts degree. He was ordained as a priest in the Church of England and served as a curate at Mablethorpe, Skirbeck, and Ropsley, all in Lincolnshire. From 1860 to his death in 1878 he was rector of Keyworth, Nottinghamshire and from 1876 he combined that post with being rector of Stanton-on-the-Wolds as well.
