= Ye Olde Cinder House =

House in West Hallam, Derbyshire, England

Coordinates: 52°58′19″N 1°22′08″W

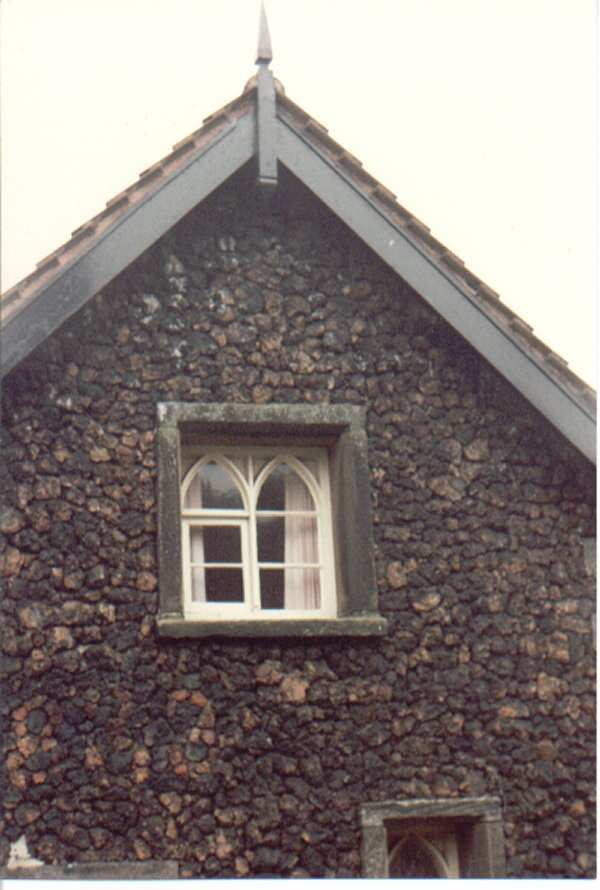
Ye Olde Cinder House

Ye Olde Cinder House is a house on Station Road in West Hallam, Derbyshire, and is made of cinder, a type of igneous rock similar to pumice. It has been a Grade II listed building since 1986.

== History ==
The Cinder House was built in 1833 to celebrate the birth of the local Squire's son, Francis Parker Newdigate. It was built from cinders which were made by burning pieces of clay that were dug from the nearby Mapperley Park in Mapperley.

The date and initials of the Squire's son are visible under the eaves of the house in different colours of stone. It reads "FN" and "1833"

== Recent history ==
For many years the house was semi-detached, half of it belonging to the Leeson family. It was sold when Ethel Cheetham (née Leeson) had to move into an old people's home in the early 1990s. The family share was then sold to the neighbours who converted it into a single dwelling. It is believed to be unique.

== See also ==
- Listed buildings in West Hallam
