= John Paxton (cricketer) =

English cricketer

Personal information
- Full name: John Paxton
- Born: 14 January 1819; Ilkeston, Derbyshire, England
- Died: December 1868 (aged 49); Ilkeston, Derbyshire, England
- Batting: Unknown
- Bowling: Unknown arm fast

Career statistics
| Competition | First-class |
|---|---|
| Matches | 1 |
| Runs scored | 0 |
| Batting average | 0.00 |
| 100s/50s | –/– |
| Top score | 0 |
| Balls bowled | 134 |
| Wickets | 0 |
| Bowling average | – |
| 5 wickets in innings | – |
| 10 wickets in match | – |
| Best bowling | – |
| Catches/stumpings | 1/– |
- Source: Cricinfo, 24 August 2019

John Paxton (14 January 1819 – December 1868) was an English first-class cricketer.

The son of George Paxton and his wife, Hannah Paxton (née Beardsley), he was born at Ilkeston in January 1819. He married Hannah Hofton in November 1837, with the couple having four children. Paxton, who played his club cricket for Rutland Cricket Club (Ilkeston) and featured in minor matches for Derbyshire, made a single appearance in first-class cricket for the North in the North v South fixture of 1849 at Leamington Spa. He bowled a total of 33.2 wicketless overs in the match, which conceded 134 runs, while with the bat he opening the batting in the North's first-innings and was dismissed without scoring by William Hillyer. By profession, he was a bailiff for the Derbyshire County Court in the Belper district. Paxton died at Ilkeston in December 1868.
