= John Blackner =

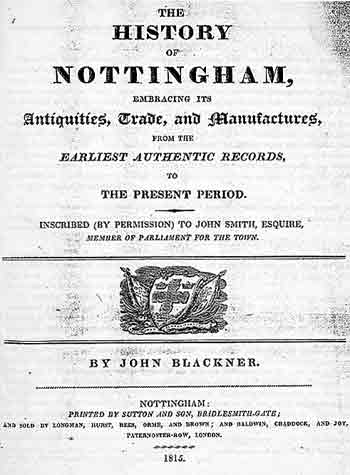
- Blackner's History of Nottingham pub. 1815
- Born: 1770; Ilkeston in Derbyshire
- Died: 1816 (aged 45–46); Nottingham
- Occupation: writer

John Blackner (1770–1816) was editor of The Statesman and author of a history of Nottingham.

== Biography ==
Blackner was born at Ilkeston, Derbyshire, about 1770. After serving an apprenticeship to a stocking-maker in his native place, he migrated to Nottingham. His education was wholly neglected in early youth and it is related that he could not even write his name when he was married.

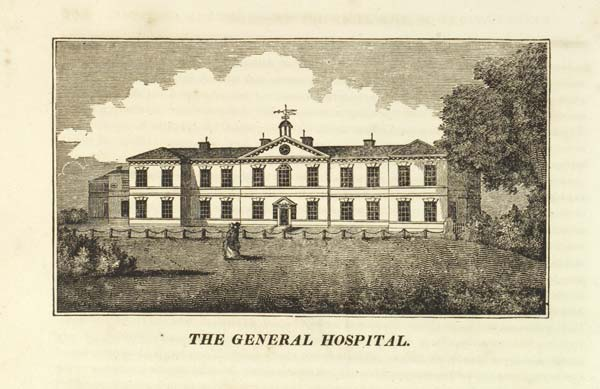
The General Hospital in Nottingham from Blackners 1815 History of Nottingham.

Blackner however had strong natural abilities including a facility for making rhymes, and a fluency of speech together with being tall and commanding. As a youth he had always been obliged to get some companion to record his ideas. Blackner now learnt to write and as he took a warm interest in the politics of those excited times he became an occasional contributor to the columns of the Nottingham Review a newspaper which represented the party to which he attached himself the low whig or radical party. His ardent radical sympathies afterwards brought him into prominence as a leader of a section of local politicians, and he acquired such literary ability and reputation as to obtain in May 1812 the editorship of the radical daily paper The Statesman, published in London.

Through failure of health he held this post only a short time. Soon afterwards he took the editorship of the Nottingham Review. He published several pamphlets, including one in 1805 on the Utility of Commerce,' and in 1815 he issued his History of Nottingham (pp. 459), a work which displays much industry and research, some complained of its bombast and party bias. His works are much referred to today by local historians, moreover they record interesting snippets such as the Brotherhood of the Chair. This group met at a house near St Anns Well where they would sit in Robin Hood's chair and wear Robin Hood's hat. As Blackner notes the group consumed a large amount of ale.

Blackner is also quoted a source for the origin of the term Luddite. According to Blackner, who himself was suspected of involvement with the Luddite group, the name came from a youth called Ludlam who when asked by his father to square his needles just took a hammer and beat them to a heap.

He was the landlord for some years of the Rancliffe Arms, Sussex Street, Nottingham, and died there on 22 December 1816.

After Blackner's death, James Orange reviewed his contribution to the history of Nottingham and noted the accuracy of his dates, however he was surprised that Blackner had ever risen to be the editor of a national newspaper.
