= Ilkeston =

Town in Derbyshire, England

Coordinates: 52°58′16″N 01°18′33″W

- Town
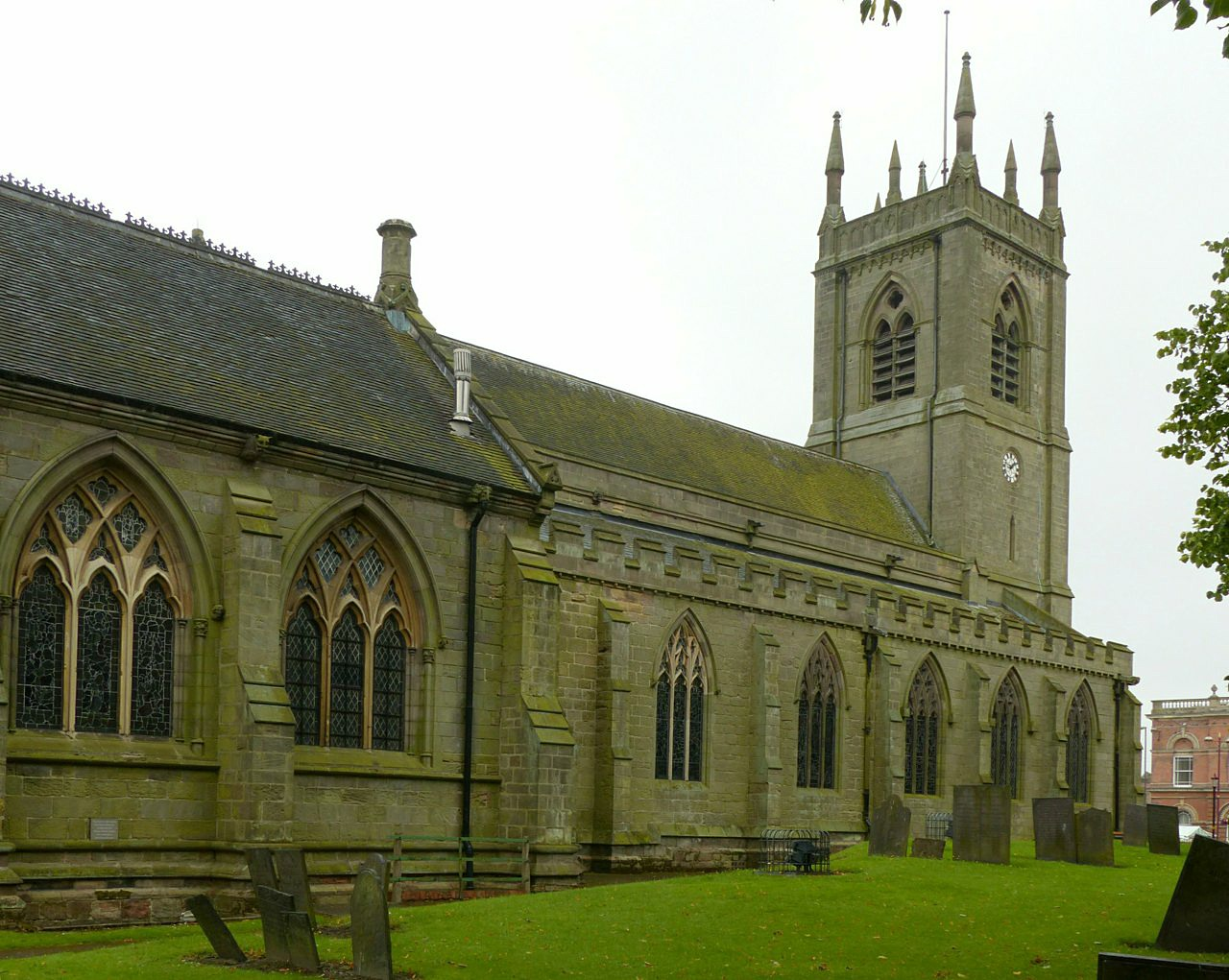
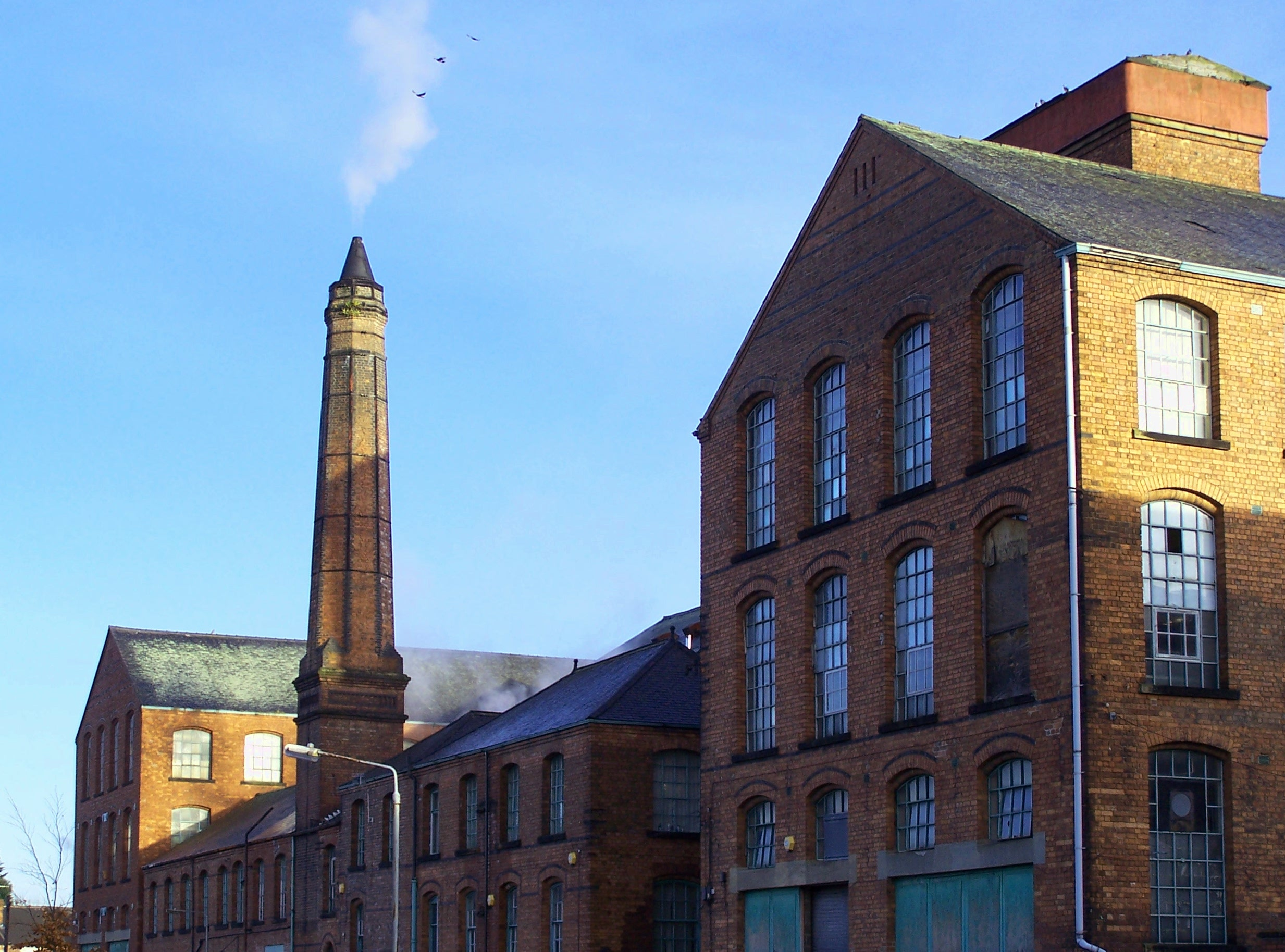
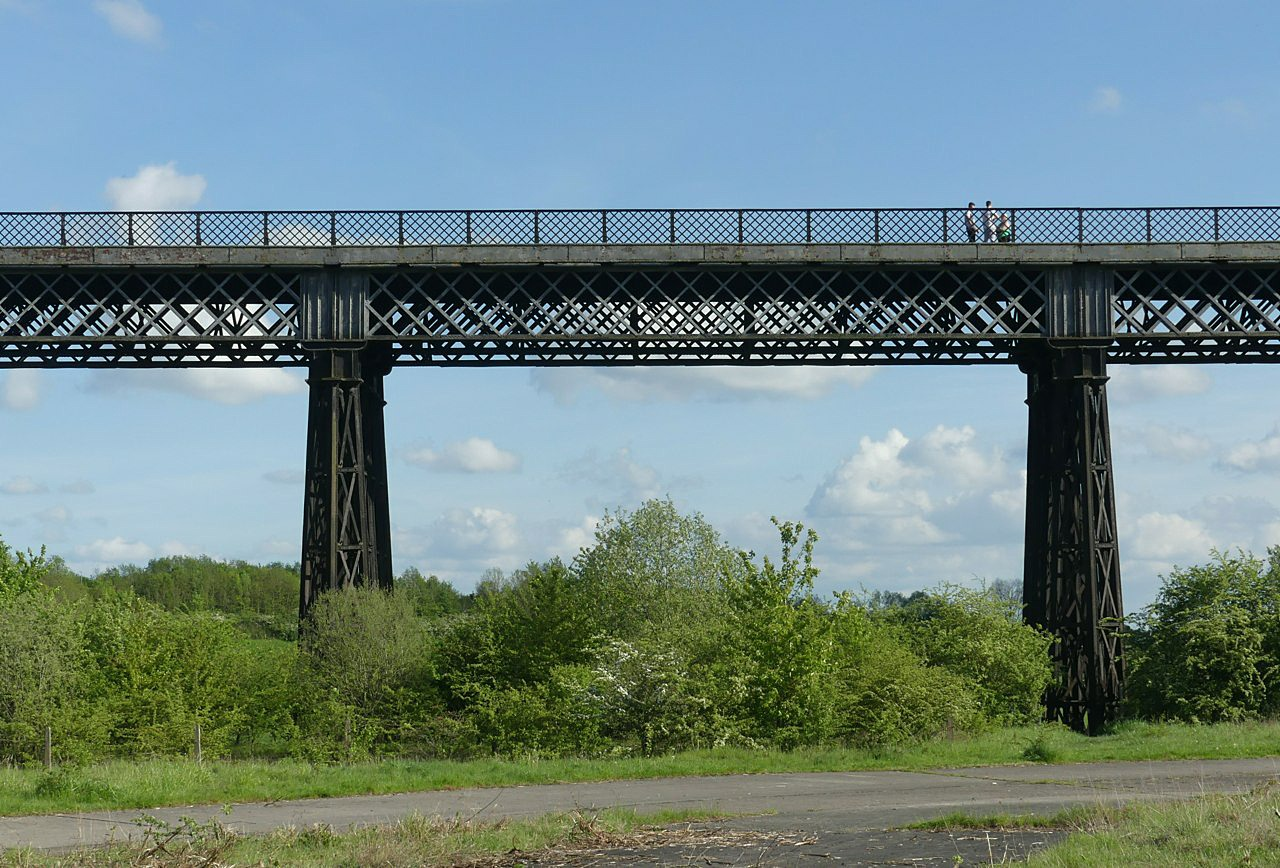
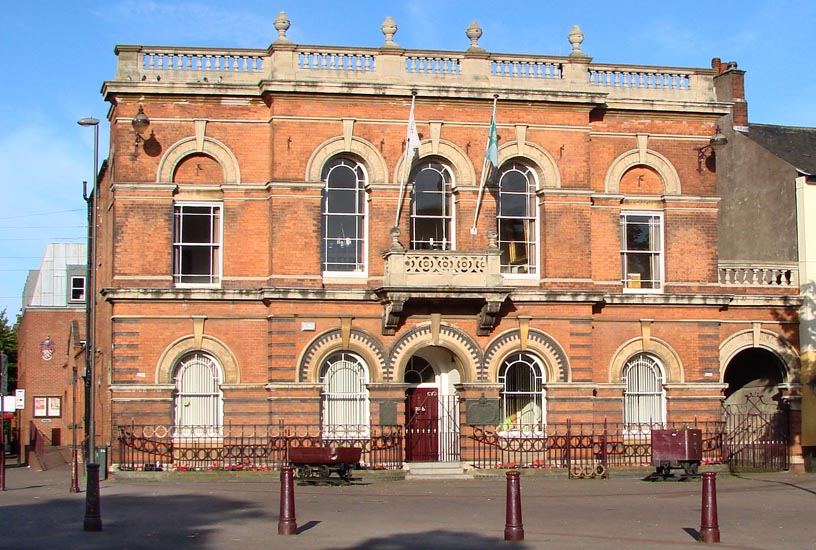
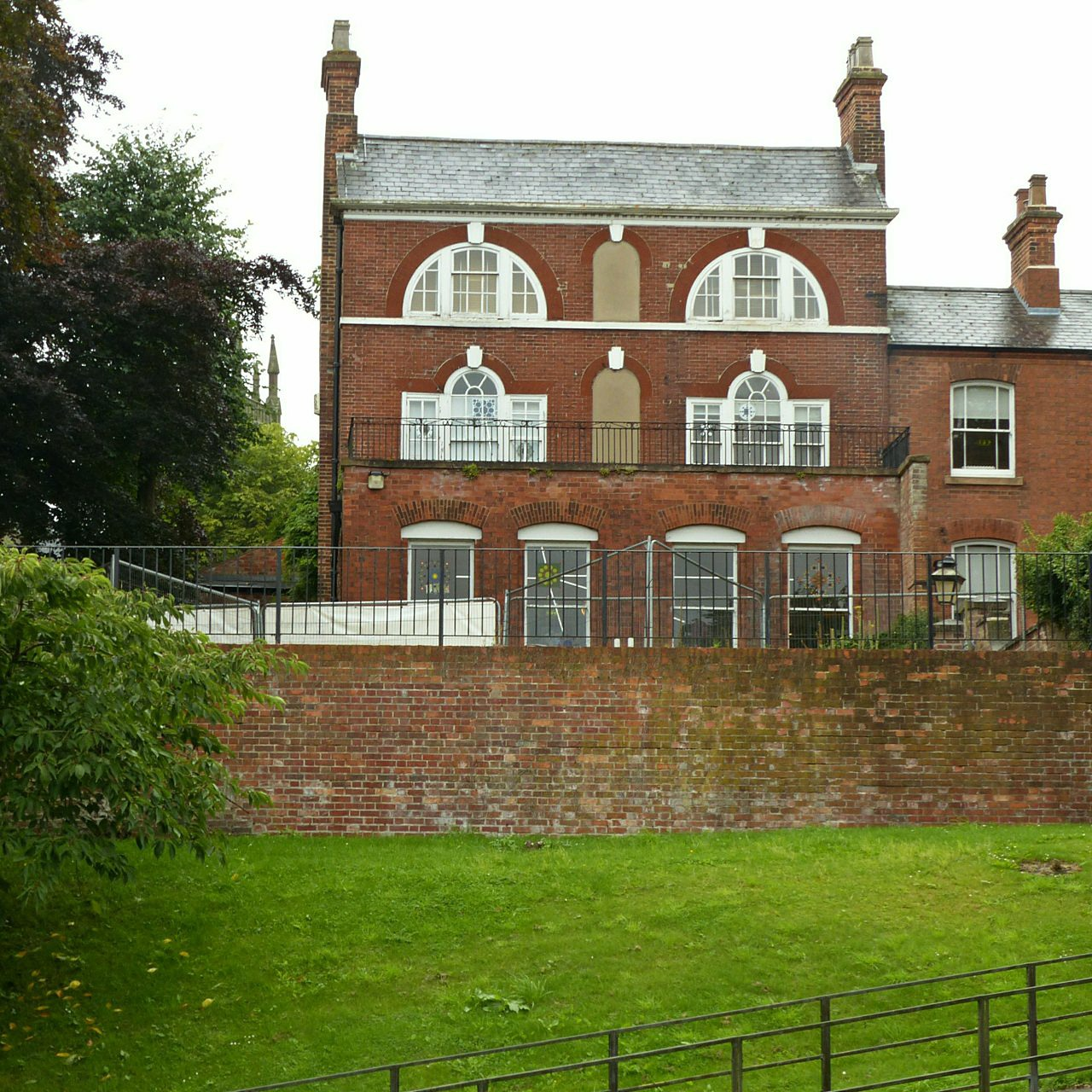
- St Mary’s Church Armstrong’s Mill Bennerley Viaduct Town Hall Museum

- Location within Derbyshire
- Population: 40,953 (2021)
- Demonym: Ilkestonian
- OS grid reference: SK 46399 41774
- District: Erewash
- Shire county: Derbyshire
- Region: East Midlands
- Country: England
- Sovereign state: United Kingdom
- Areas of the town: List: Cotmanhay; Town Centre; Kirk Hallam; Larklands; Hallam Fields; Shipley View
- Post town: ILKESTON
- Postcode district: DE7
- Dialling code: 0115
- Police: Derbyshire
- Fire: Derbyshire
- Ambulance: East Midlands
- UK Parliament: Erewash
- Website: https://www.erewash.gov.uk/

Ilkeston (/ˈɪlkəstən/ ILL-kis-tun) is a town located in the Borough of Erewash in Derbyshire, England, with a population of 40,953 at the 2021 census. Its major industries, coal mining, iron working and lace making/textiles, have now all but disappeared. Part of the Nottingham Urban Area, the town is located between the cities Derby and Nottingham, near the M1 motorway, and on the River Erewash. Its eastern boundary borders Nottinghamshire to the east and is only two miles from Nottingham's western edge.

== History and culture ==
Ilkeston was likely founded during the 6th century, and gets its name from its supposed founder Elch or Elcha, who was an Anglian chieftain. The town appears as Tilchestune in the Domesday Book of 1086, when it was owned principally by Gilbert de Ghent. Gilbert also controlled nearby Shipley, West Hallam and Stanton by Dale. Ilkeston was created a borough by Queen Victoria in 1887.

Ilkeston is one of several places where the distinctive dialect of East Midlands English is extensively spoken. Ilkeston is referred to as 'Ilson' in this dialect. Generally the name is pronounced with three syllables, Ilkisstun, not Ilk's tun.

The American Adventure, a large theme park which closed in 2007, was located on the outskirts of Ilkeston on the former Woodside Colliery adjoining Shipley Country Park.

NatWest's Ilkeston branch gained much media interest when a hole in a neighbouring wall received an influx of reviews on Tripadvisor, causing them to suspend reviews in February 2020.

=== Stanton Ironworks ===
One of the biggest and most important local employers was the Stanton Ironworks, later known as Stanton and Staveley – the continuation of a long-standing tradition of iron working in this area. There has been evidence of iron working and quarrying in the area since Roman times, and the industry began blossoming into a huge industrial concern in the 1780s. By the mid-19th century there were several blast furnaces and the production rose from around 500 tons of pig iron per month to 7,000 at the end of the century. The Stanton Ironworks acquired a number of smaller ironstone quarrying and ironworks companies. These included the Wellingborough Iron Company in 1932.

Steel pipe manufacturing began at Stanton after World War I and later concrete pipes were produced, Stanton being the first in the UK to develop the 'spun pipe' process.

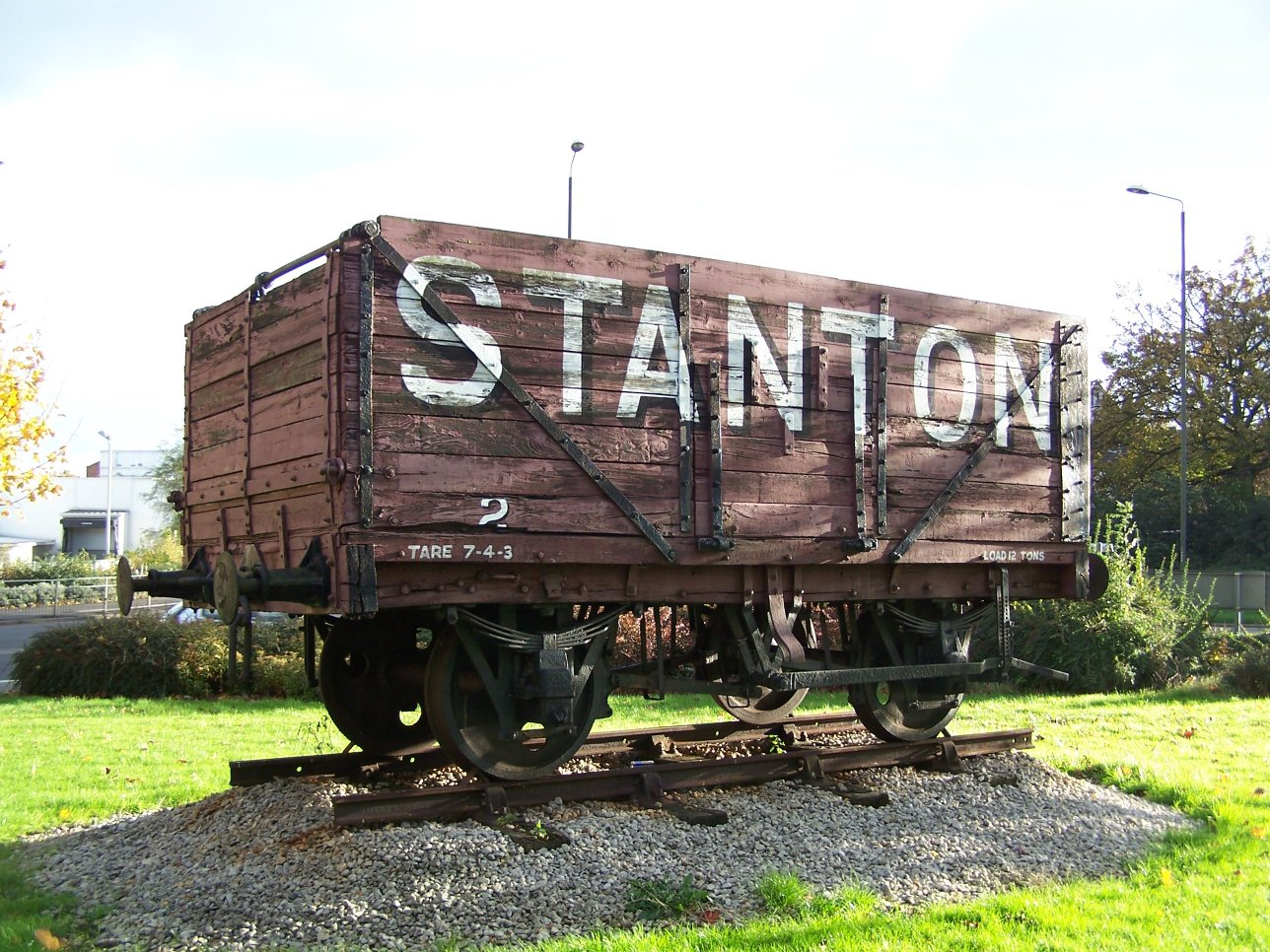
A restored Stanton Wagon, Chalons Way, Ilkeston

In the mid-19th century the works produced 20,000 tons of iron castings per year, 2.5 millions by 1905. Up to 12,500 people were employed during the period when the works were part of British Steel Corporation, of which 7,000 worked at the Stanton works.

During its long existence the works produced huge quantities of a variety of products, including pig iron, tunnel castings, (used in projects such as the London Underground), pipes and street furniture as well as bitumen, roadstone, chemicals and munition casings.

The works gradually declined, the business being run from 1985 by the French Saint-Gobain Group. The last casting was an emotional event in 2007. The huge Stanton site has been partially given over to business park and the rest of the site is earmarked for redevelopment which is subject to local opposition.

=== Charter fair ===
Ilkeston Market Place is the site of a Charter fair. The fair celebrated its 772nd anniversary in 2024, the Charter being granted by King Henry III in 1252. This makes the fair older than Nottingham's famous Goose Fair and it is one of the largest street fairs in the Country, indeed in Europe.

The present fair developed from two separate fairs, as another 'agricultural hiring fair' or 'Statutes Fair' was traditionally held on Wakes week in October as well as the original Charter Fair which was held on the Feast of the Assumption of the Blessed Virgin Mary (15 August). The two fairs were combined in 1888 and the one Charter Fair has been held in October ever since.

Since 1931 the fair has been officially opened by the Mayor - first of Ilkeston and since 1974 of Erewash - on the Fair Thursday at noon with the Town Clerk (Chief Executive) reading the Charter from the steps of the Town Hall.

=== Spa baths ===
From early in the 19th century the existence of natural mineral waters was noted here and exploited. A local businessman Thomas Potter built, in 1831, the famous Ilkeston Bath at the bottom of Town Street attached to the Rutland Hotel. For over 60 years the baths helped tourism to the town at a time when spa towns like Bath and Harrogate enjoyed popularity. 'If you're doubled in pain and thin as a lath, Come at once then and try, the famed Ilkeston Bath,' was a well known advertising slogan. A mixture of a general decline in the popularity of spa bathing and, reportedly, contamination of the waters from mining activities led to the eventual closure of the baths just before 1900. The baths and the adjacent Rutland Hotel, which also enjoyed a revenue from tourism, no longer exist though they are remembered in the name of 'Bath Street'.

== Transport ==
=== Railway ===
Ilkeston did not have a railway station from 1967 to 2017, despite its substantial population and the fact that the Erewash Valley Line (formerly part of the Midland Railway, later the LMS) skirts the eastern edge of the town. Ilkeston once had three railway stations. Ilkeston Junction station, also known as "Ilkeston Junction & Cossall", was on the former Midland Railway and later LMS Erewash Valley Main Line: this station closed in January 1967. A short branch led from this station to Ilkeston Town station, at the north end of Bath Street, which closed to passengers in June 1947.

Ilkeston's third station was Ilkeston North, on the former Great Northern Railway (later LNER) line from Nottingham to Derby Friargate station, closed in September 1964. A major feature of this line was Bennerley Viaduct, a 1,452-foot (443 m) long, 61-foot (19 m) high, wrought iron structure which still crosses the Erewash valley just to the north east of Ilkeston. Once threatened with demolition, it is now a Grade II listed building, though the line and embankments have long since been removed. The Viaduct has been the subject of much renewed interest and has been reopened to the public as part of a cycleway and footpath.

Following a long-running local campaign, in March 2013 Transport Secretary Patrick McLoughlin announced that Ilkeston was one of three sites 'most likely' to get a new station as part of the 'New Stations Fund', costing £5 million and sited close to the old Ilkeston Junction station. On 15 May 2013 it was announced this new station would be built, which would be named Ilkeston station. It has two platforms, which can take six trains per hour with up to six passenger cars and includes waiting shelters. A 150 space car park, cycle storage, bus stop, drop off point and taxi rank are also on site. The station is unstaffed with automated ticket machines.

Due to flood prevention work and the discovery of great crested newts, the opening was significantly delayed, the new station opened on 2 April 2017.

=== Buses ===
Trentbarton operates the majority of buses around Ilkeston, including the Ilkeston Flyer into Derby, My15 into Long Eaton and East Midlands Airport, The Two into Nottingham, 31 into Kirk Hallam, 32 into Derby, 33 into Mansfield, and 34 into Hucknall. In addition, Notts + Derby and Littles Travel operate some Derbyshire County Council tendered routes around Ilkeston, the latter operating the 14A and 14B routes into Stanton by Dale and Sandiacre.

== Sport ==
=== Football ===
- The original Ilkeston Town was liquidated in 2010 after a 114-year history. Ilkeston FC was formed the following year, which was in turn liquidated in 2017. However, by July 2017 a new club, Ilkeston Town F.C. founded by the former owner of Notts County Alan Hardy, replaced the liquidated Ilkeston FC, and the new club's home ground was established on the New Manor Ground, on Awsworth Road.

=== Rugby ===
- Ilkeston Rugby Club (known as the "Elks") is a Rugby union club founded in 1926. The home ground is based at 'The Stute', Hallam Fields Road.

=== Cricket ===
- Ilkeston Rutland Cricket Club (established in 1829) is based on Rutland Sports Park. The club currently has 4 senior teams in the Derbyshire County Cricket League, and a well established Junior section playing competitive cricket in the Erewash Young Cricketers League.

First-Class County games
Every season between 1925 and 1994, the Derbyshire County Cricket Club played up to a couple of first-class cricket matches on the Rutland Recreation Ground, and one-day matches between 1970 and 1994.

=== Tennis ===
- Ilkeston Tennis Club is based on Rutland Sports Park and is a member of the Derby Tennis League. It is claimed to be the largest tennis club in Ilkeston, offering tennis for all ages and abilities as well as professional coaching. Facilities include 4 Outdoor Tennis Courts and 3 indoor tennis courts.
- Stanton Tennis Club is a private tennis establishment situated at The Stute Hallam Fields Road, sports complex. There are 3 private tennis courts at this tennis facility.

=== Basketball ===
- Ilkeston Outlaws Basketball Club, established 1966, field's teams in the local Sherwood Basketball League and the Basketball England National League. The Ilkeston Outlaws Basketball Club have two main junior basketball teams: the Ilkeston Hawks and Ilkeston Falcons for ages 4–18 years.

=== Golf ===
- Ilkeston Borough Golf Club was founded in 1929 and had access to a 9-hole golf course, known as 'Pewit Golf Course' located off West End Drive, Ilkeston. The course closed in 2022 after struggling throughout the COVID period, it is now Pewit Coronation Meadows Local Nature Reserve.

== Media ==
Local news and television programmes are BBC East Midlands and ITV Central. Television signals are received from the Waltham TV transmitter, and the Nottingham relay transmitter.

The town is served by both BBC Radio Nottingham on 103.8 FM and BBC Radio Derby on 104.5 FM. Other radio stations including Smooth East Midlands on 106.6 FM, Capital East Midlands on 96.2 FM, Greatest Hits Radio Midlands on 106.6 FM and Erewash Sound, a community based radio station on 96.8 FM.

The town is served by the Ilkeston Advertiser and Ilkeston Life newspapers.

== Twin towns ==
Ilkeston is twinned with:

- Châlons-en-Champagne in France, since 1957.

== Notable residents ==
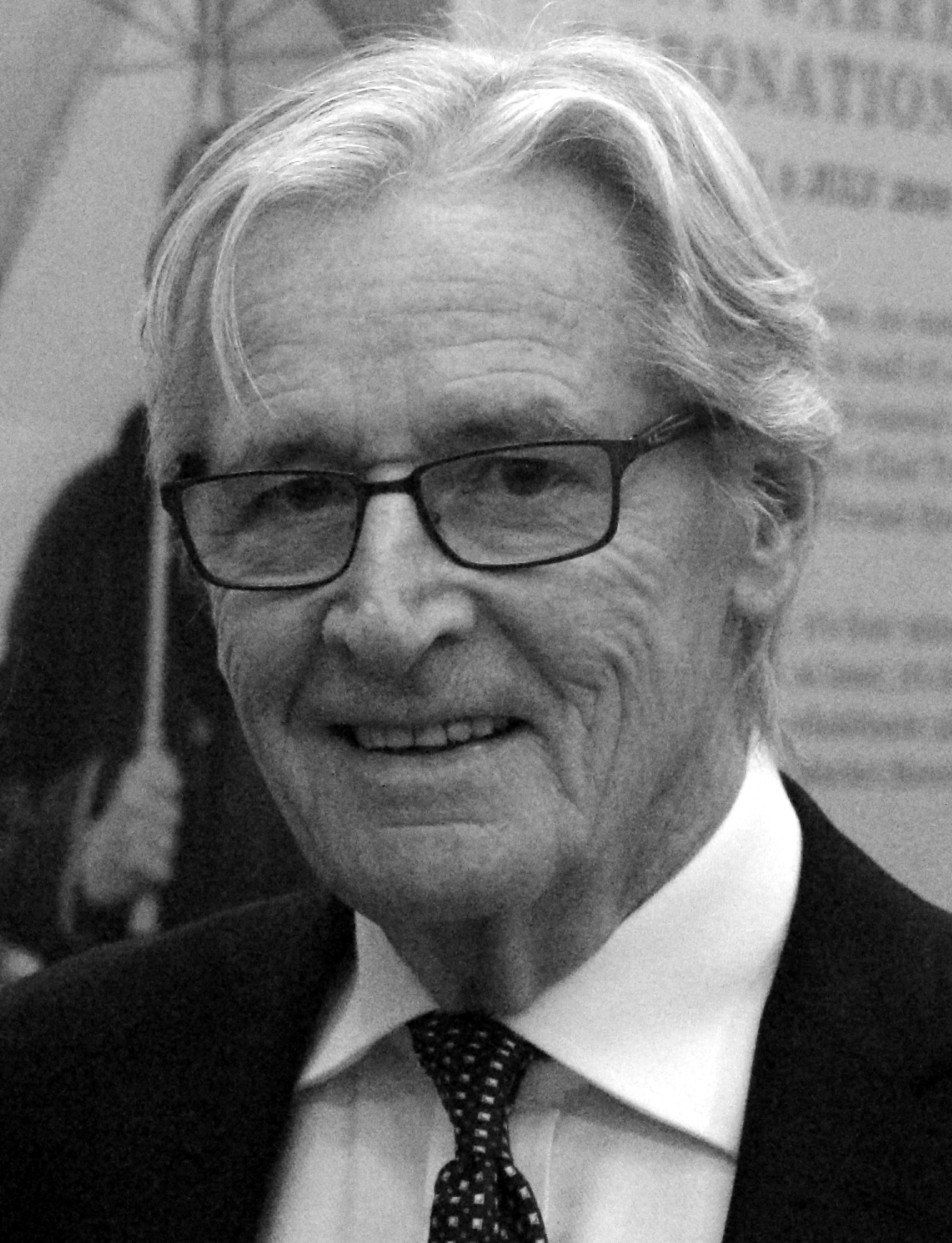
William Roache, 2017

- John Blackner (1770–1816), editor of The Statesman and author of a history of Nottingham.
- Pierrepont Mundy (1815–1889), first-class cricketer and Major-General in the Royal Horse Artillery
- Samuel Taylor (1816–1875), the famous Ilson Giant who reached the height of 7' 4", was born nearby at Hallam Fields.
- Alfred Potter (1827–1878), clergyman and a first-class cricketer
- T. Henry Howard (1849–1923), the second Chief of the Staff of The Salvation Army
- Stanley Hawley (1867–1916), pianist and composer, who specialised in recitation melodramas for speaker and piano, at 61 South Street.
- Richard Jenkin (1925–2002), a Cornish nationalist politician and one of the founding members of Mebyon Kernow
- William Roache (born 1932), actor who plays Ken Barlow in Coronation Street, grew up in Ilkeston. World record holder as the longest-serving actor to play the same role continuously, since 1960.
- Mel Ramsden (1944–2024), a conceptual artist and member of the Art & Language artist group.
- Robert Lindsay (born 1949), stage and TV actor played Citizen Smith and latterly My Family. Before then he worked at the nearby Stanton & Staveley steel works and also attended the Ilkeston detachment of the Army Cadet Force.
- Ben Roberts (1950–2021) who played Chief Inspector Derek Conway in ITV's The Bill
- Linda Armstrong (born ca.1975), an actress, born in Ilkeston, played Sister Brigid in The Royal.
- James Holder (born 1991) - Oxford University Biochemist, born in West Hallam and proud Ilsonian

=== Sport ===
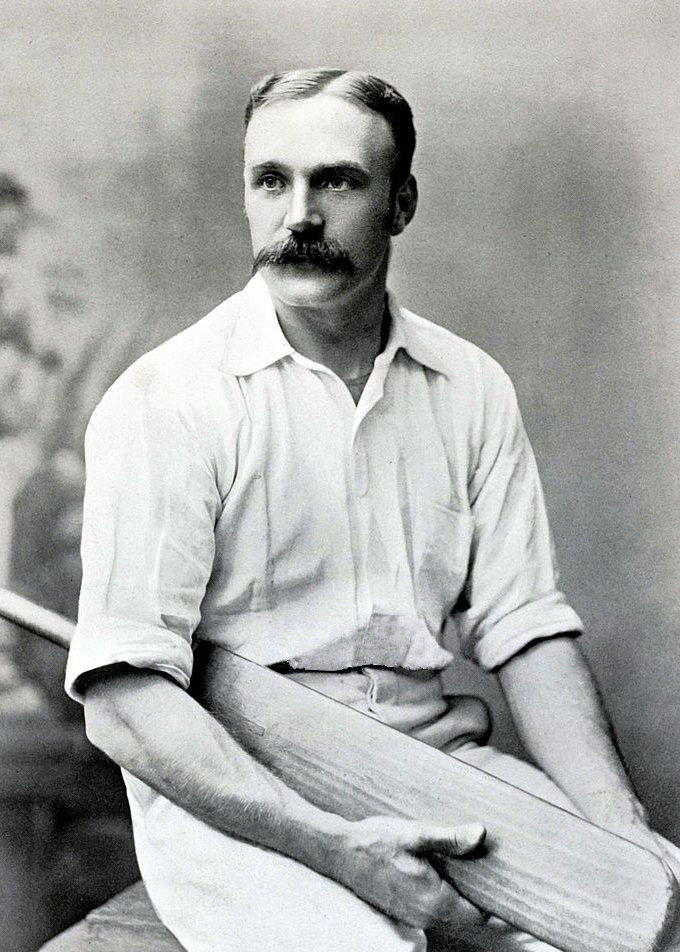
Frank Sugg, ca.1895

- John Paxton (1819–1868), cricketer, played one First-class cricket match in 1849
- Walter Sugg (1860–1933), cricketer, who played 129 First-class cricket matches
- Frank Sugg (1862–1933), footballer and first-class cricketer who played 305 First-class cricket matches and 2 Test matches
- Jim Baker (1891–1966), footballer, played 284 games including 200 for Leeds United
- Alf Baker (1898–1955), footballer who played 310 games for Arsenal.
- Eddie Barks (1921–1989), footballer who played 279 games including 213 for Mansfield Town
- Geoff Barrowcliffe (1931–2009), footballer who played 475 games for Derby County
- Ray Straw (1933–2001), footballer who played 281 games including 143 for Coventry City
- Philip Russell (born 1944), cricketer who played 170 first-class cricket matches for Derbyshire
- John Tudor (1946–2025), footballer who played 387 games
- Scott Barrett (born 1963), footballer who played 472 games
- Jane Smit (born 1972), cricketer who played 21 Women's Test cricket matches
- John Brough (born 1973), footballer who played over 300 games

== Gallery ==
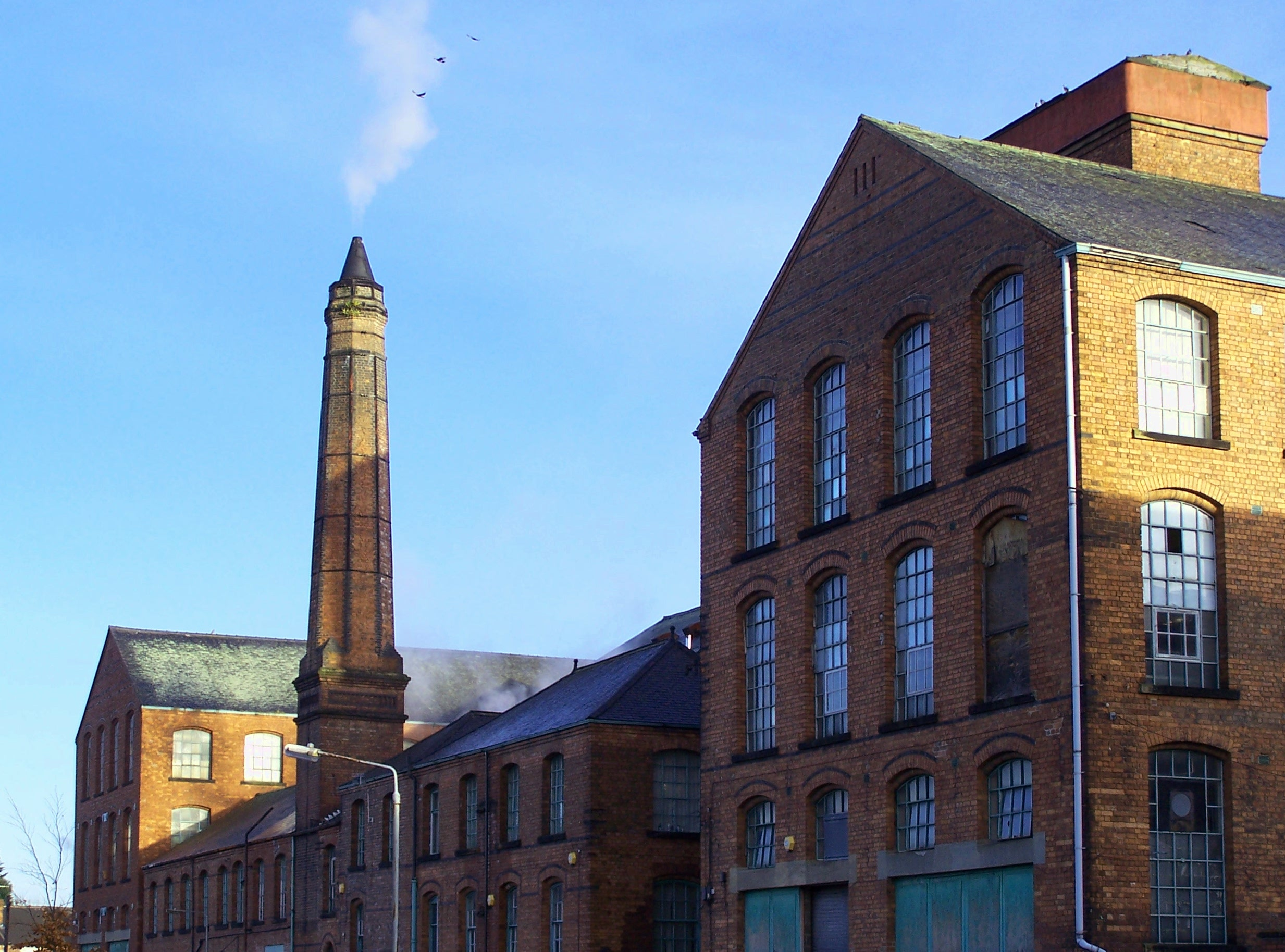
Armstrong's Mill

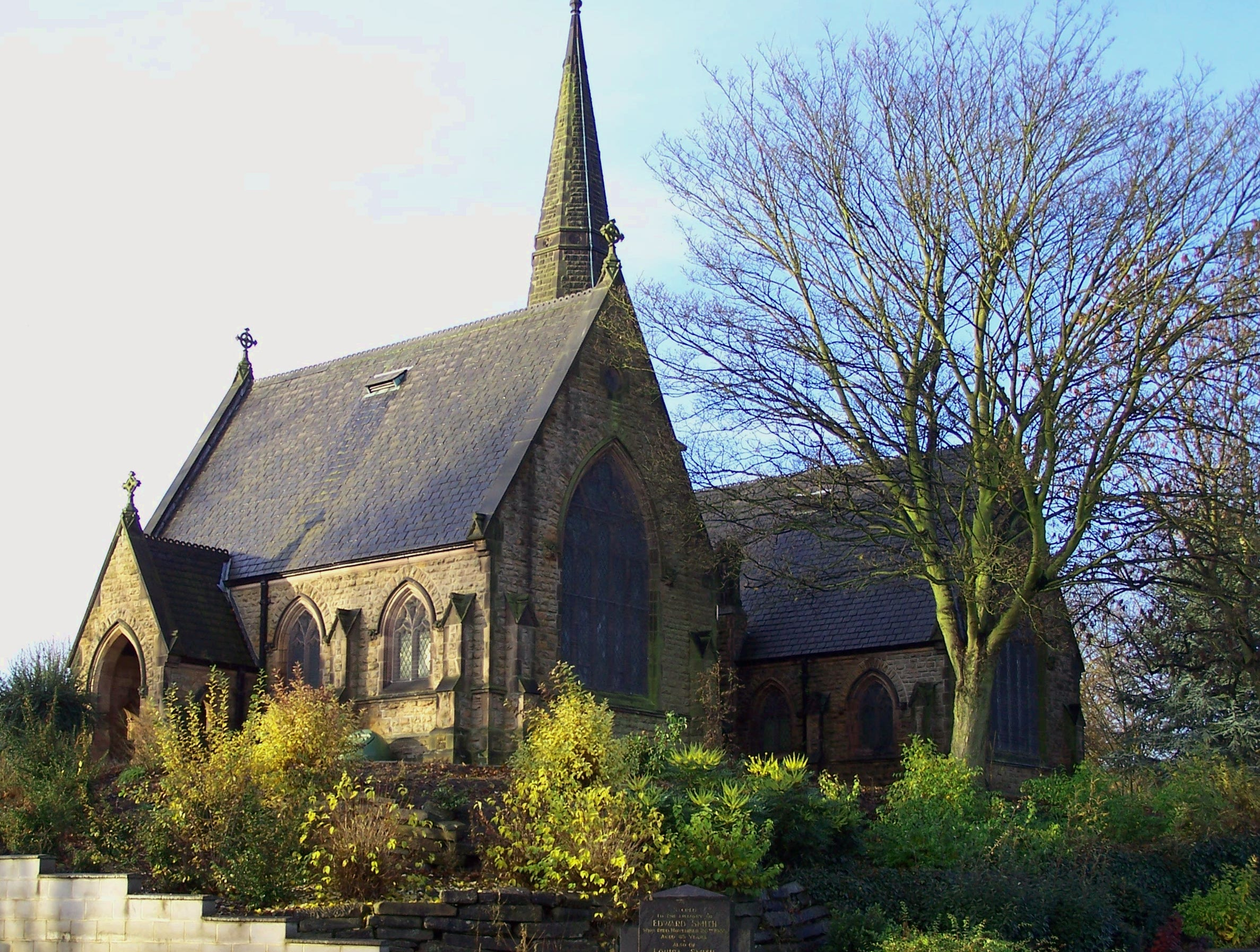
Park Cemetery Chapel

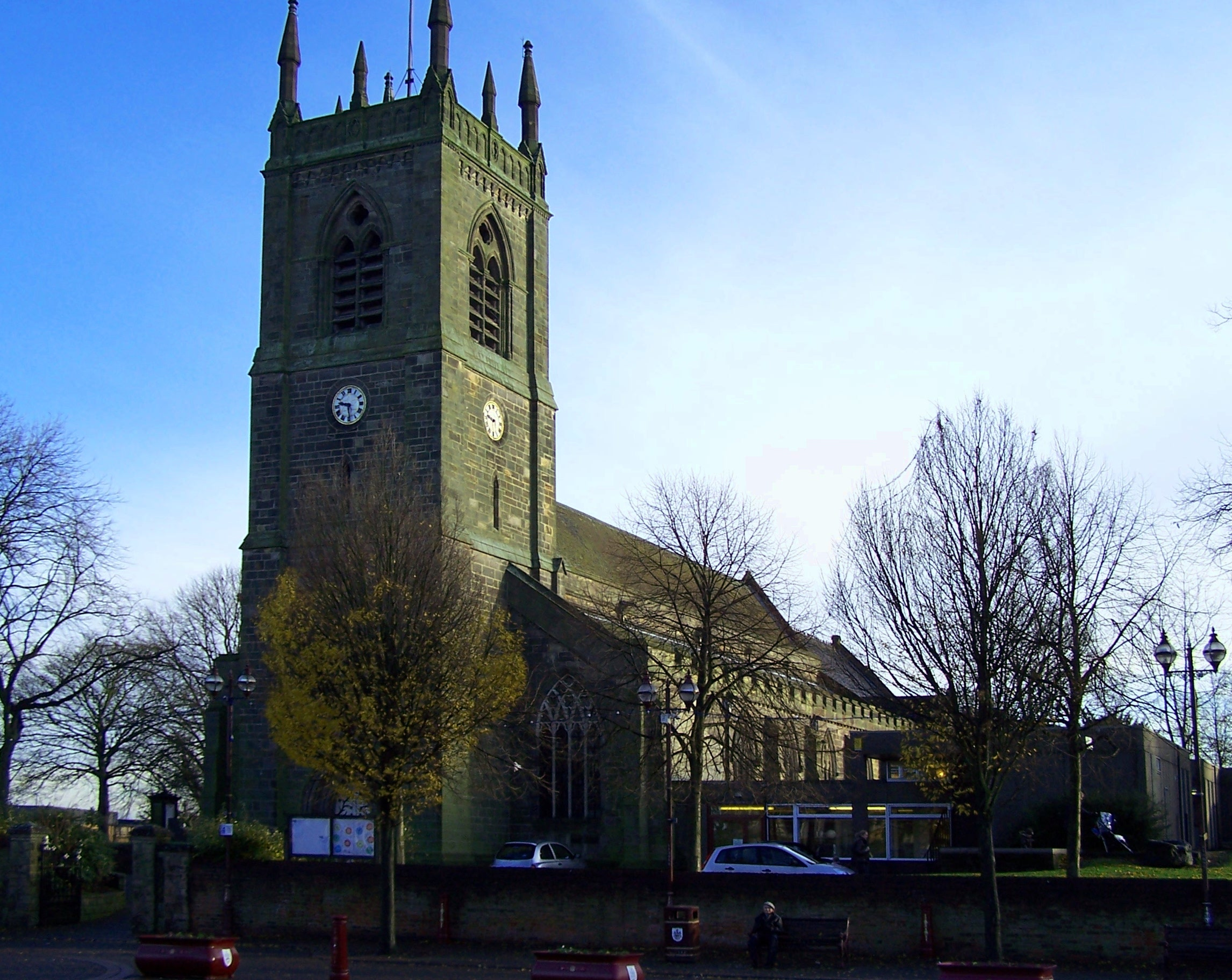
St Mary's Church

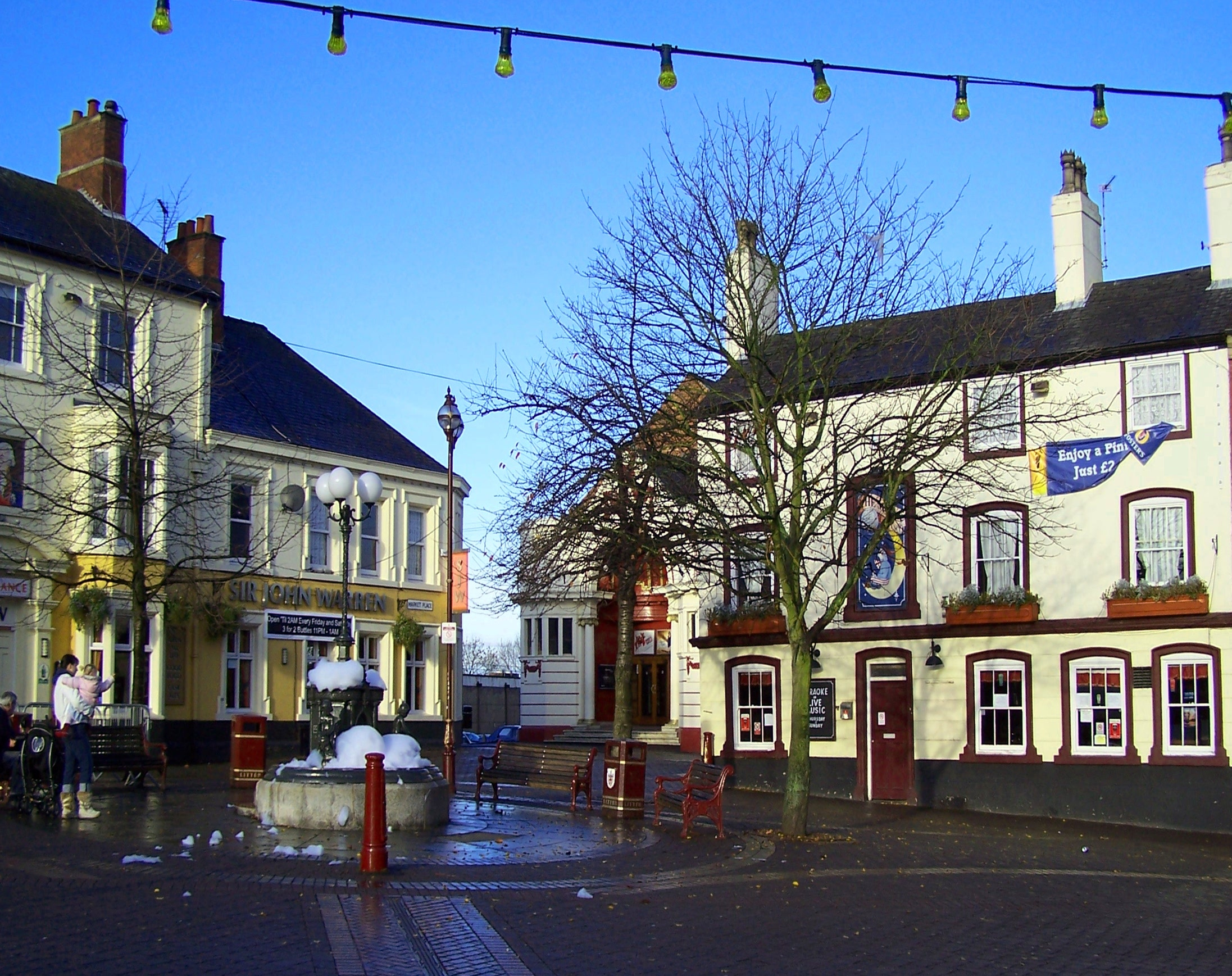
North Side of Market Place

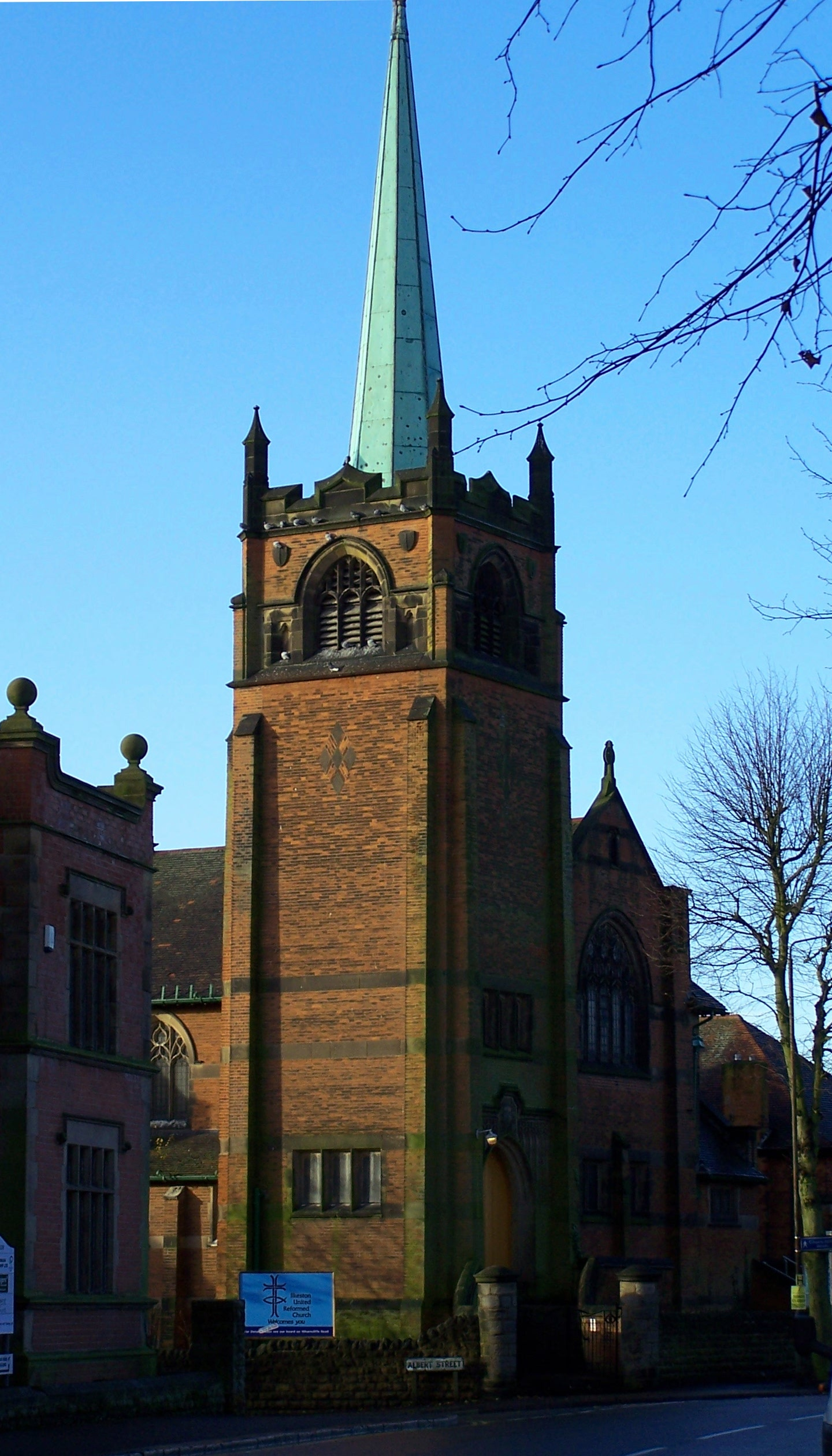
United Reformed Church

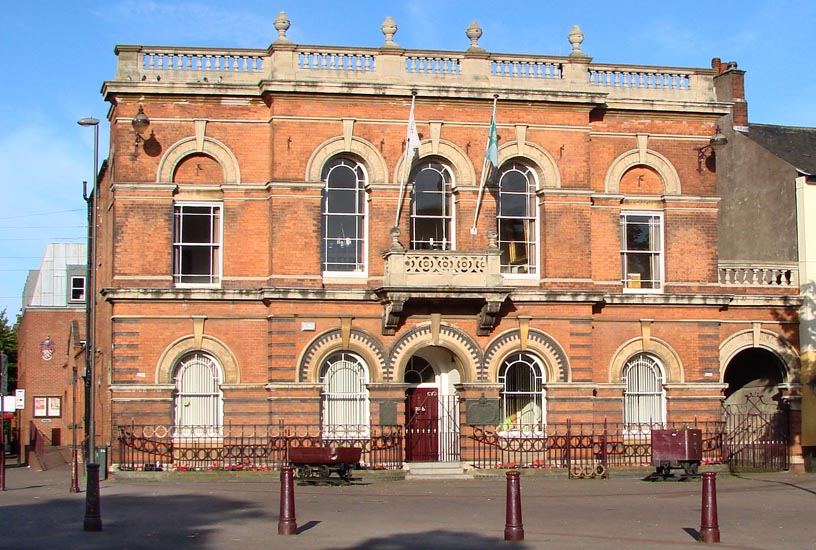
Ilkeston Town Hall

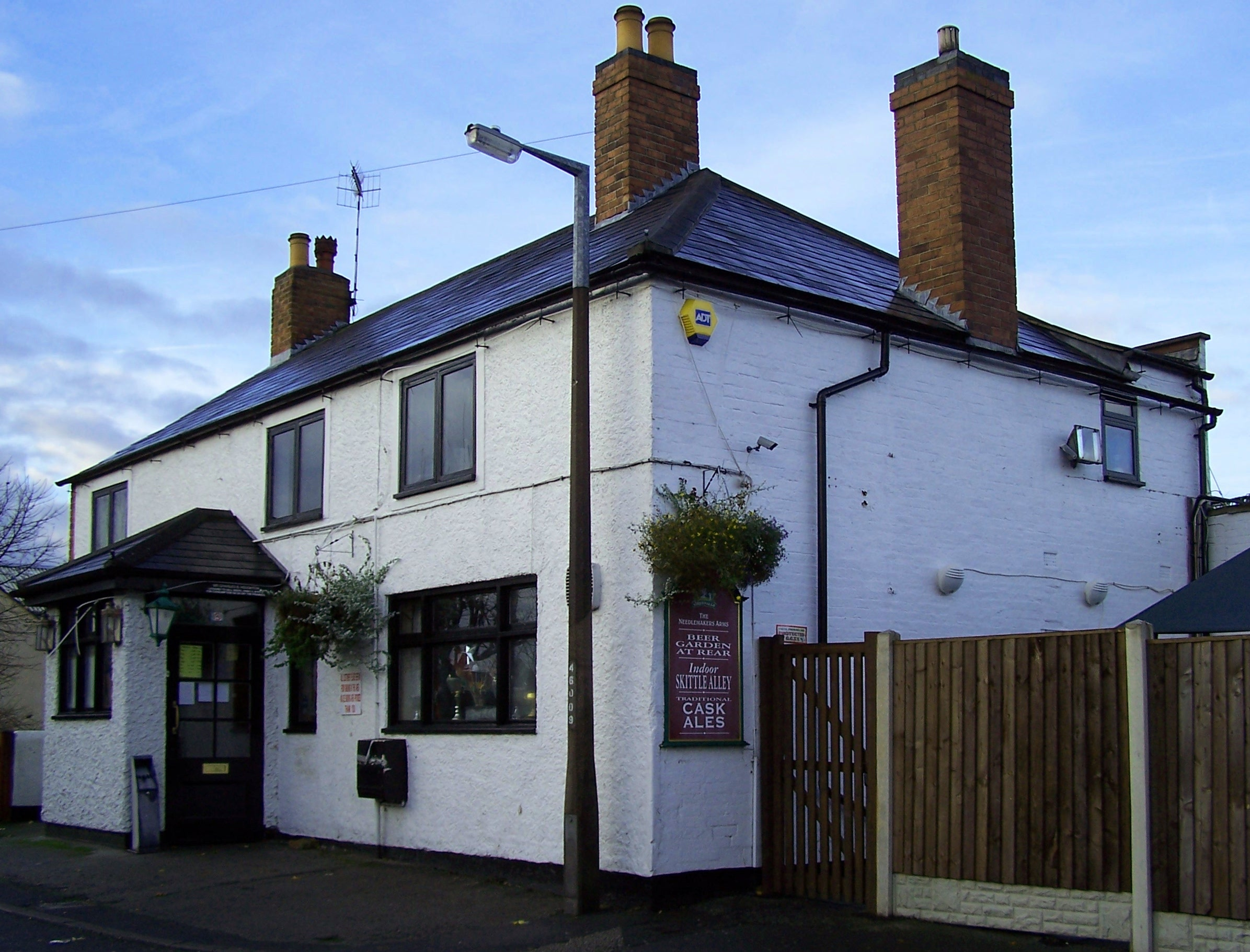
Needle Makers Pub

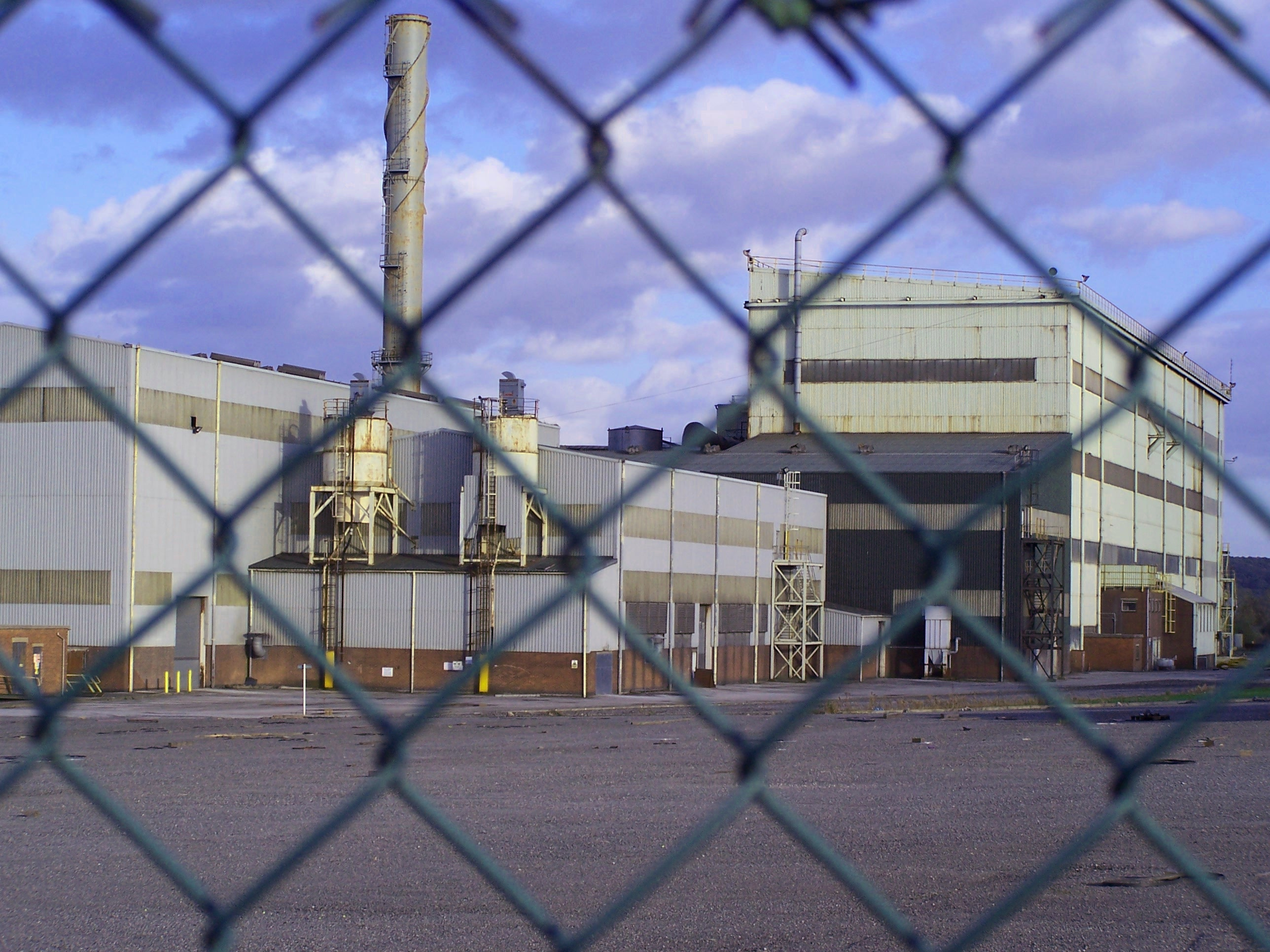
Stanton Ironworks Oct 2008 (demolished Autumn 2009)

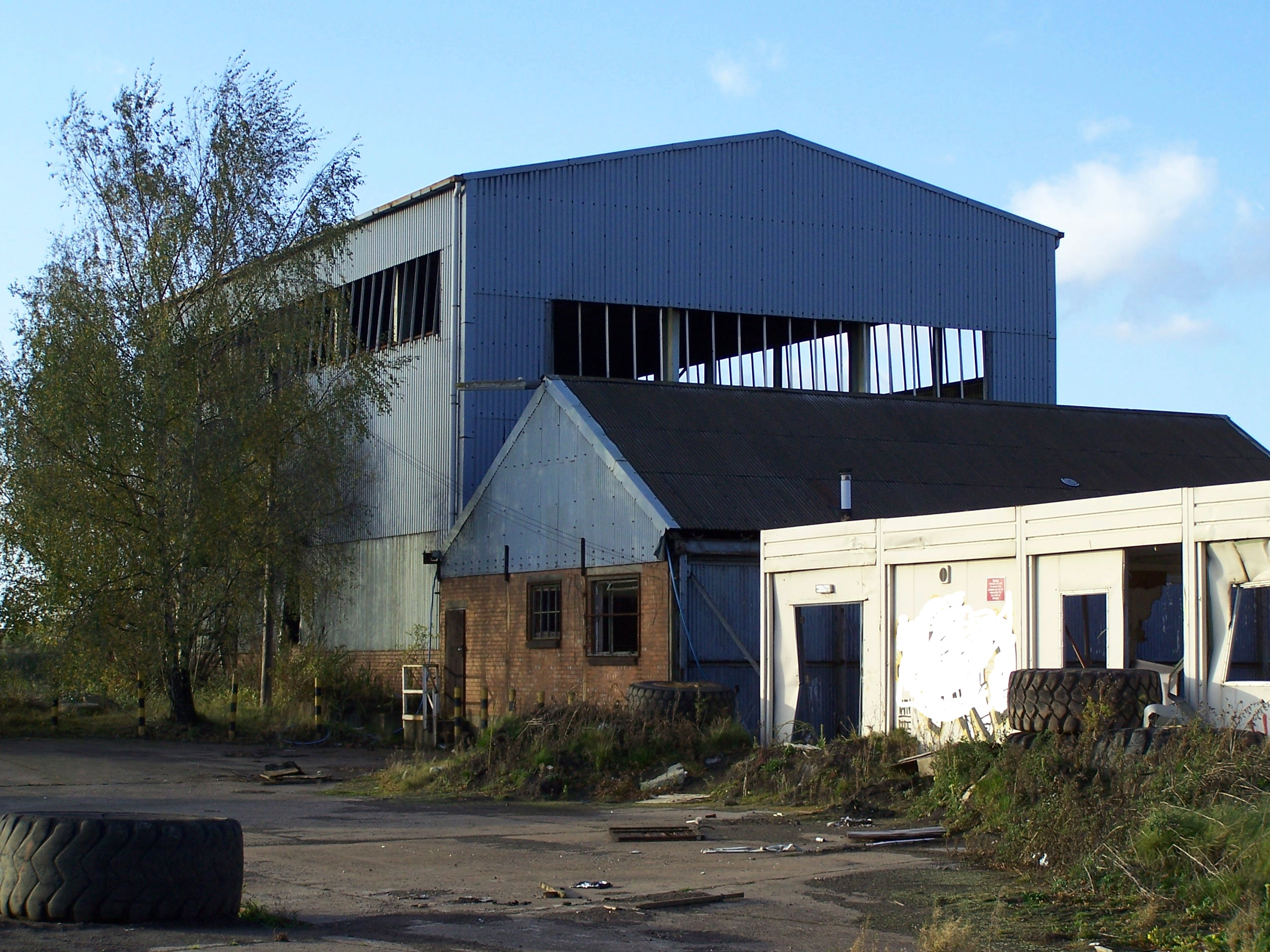
Stanton Ironworks Remnants

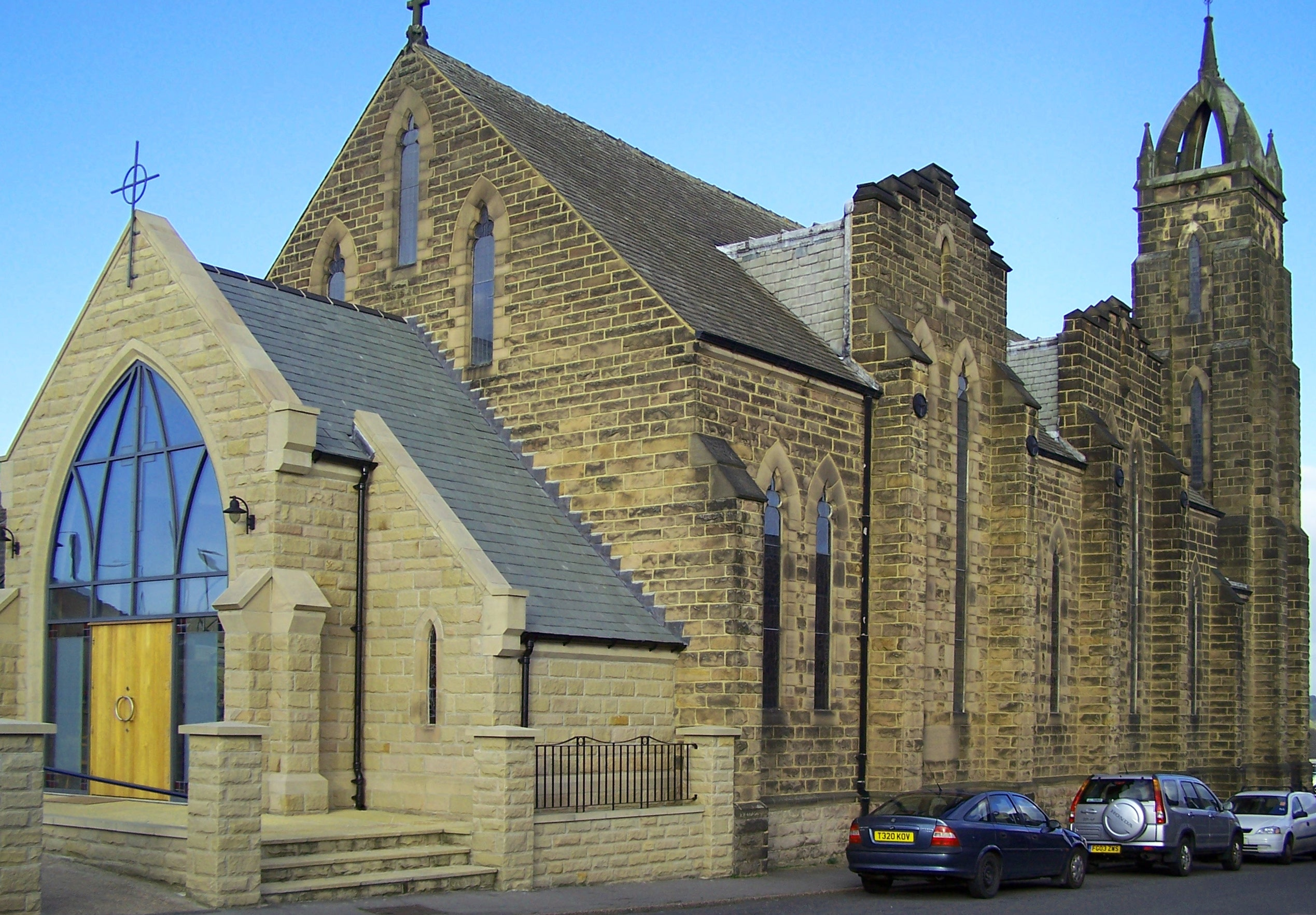
Our Lady and St Thomas of Hereford Roman Catholic Church

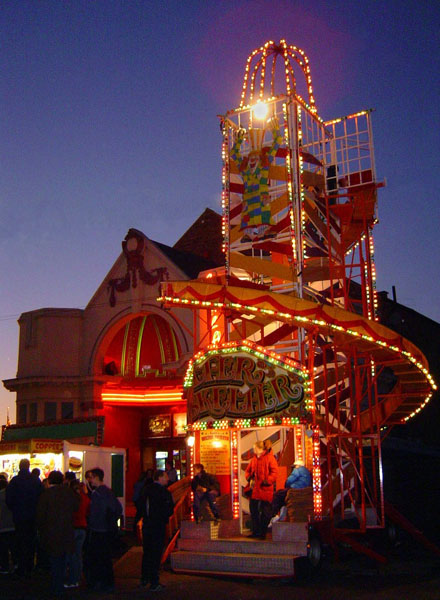
Helter skelter at Ilkeston Fair

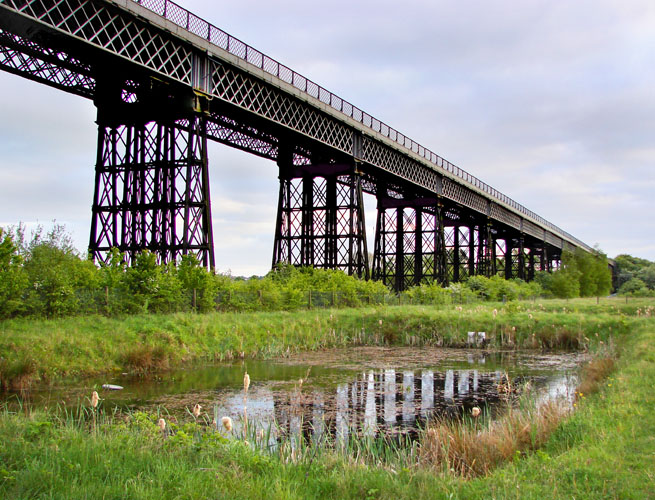
Bennerley Viaduct
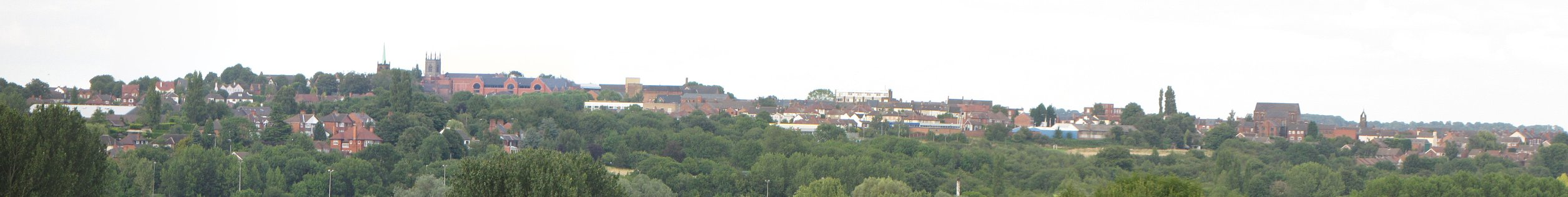
Ilkeston skyline

== See also ==
- Listed buildings in Ilkeston
- Ilkeston Corporation Tramways
- Ilkeston Grammar School
- Ilkeston Community Hospital
