= Rutland Recreation Ground, Ilkeston =

Cricket ground in Ilkeston, England

Coordinates: 52°58′11″N 1°19′0″W

The Rutland Recreation Ground is a cricket ground in Ilkeston, Derbyshire (not the historical county of Rutland, as the name may suggest). The Derbyshire first XI played at the ground regularly between 1925 and 1994, with the ground hosting at least one County Championship match – and sometimes as many as three or four – each year until 1978. The ground also saw John Player League matches in the 1970s. The ground hosted 93 first-class matches and 16 List A matches.

Game Information:

Game Type	No. of Games
County Championship Matches	89
limited-over county matches	16
Twenty20 matches	0

Game Statistics: first-class:

Category	Information
Highest Team Score	Derbyshire (529/7dec against Nottinghamshire) in 1952
Lowest Team Score	Middlesex (54 against Derbyshire) in 1977
Best Batting Performance	John Langridge (234 Runs for Sussex against Derbyshire in 1949
Best Bowling Performance	Tich Freeman (9/50 for Kent against Derbyshire) in 1930

Game Statistics: one-day:

Category	Information
Highest Team Score	Somerset (248/4 in 60 overs against Derbyshire) in 1977
Lowest Team Score	Derbyshire (119 in 40 overs against Essex) in 1976
Best Batting Performance	Brian Rose (128 Runs for Somerset against Derbyshire in 1977
Best Bowling Performance	Alan Ward (6/24 for Derbyshire against Essex) in 1976
