= Stretton railway station =

Former railway station in Derbyshire, England

Coordinates: 53.148°N 1.423°W

Stretton
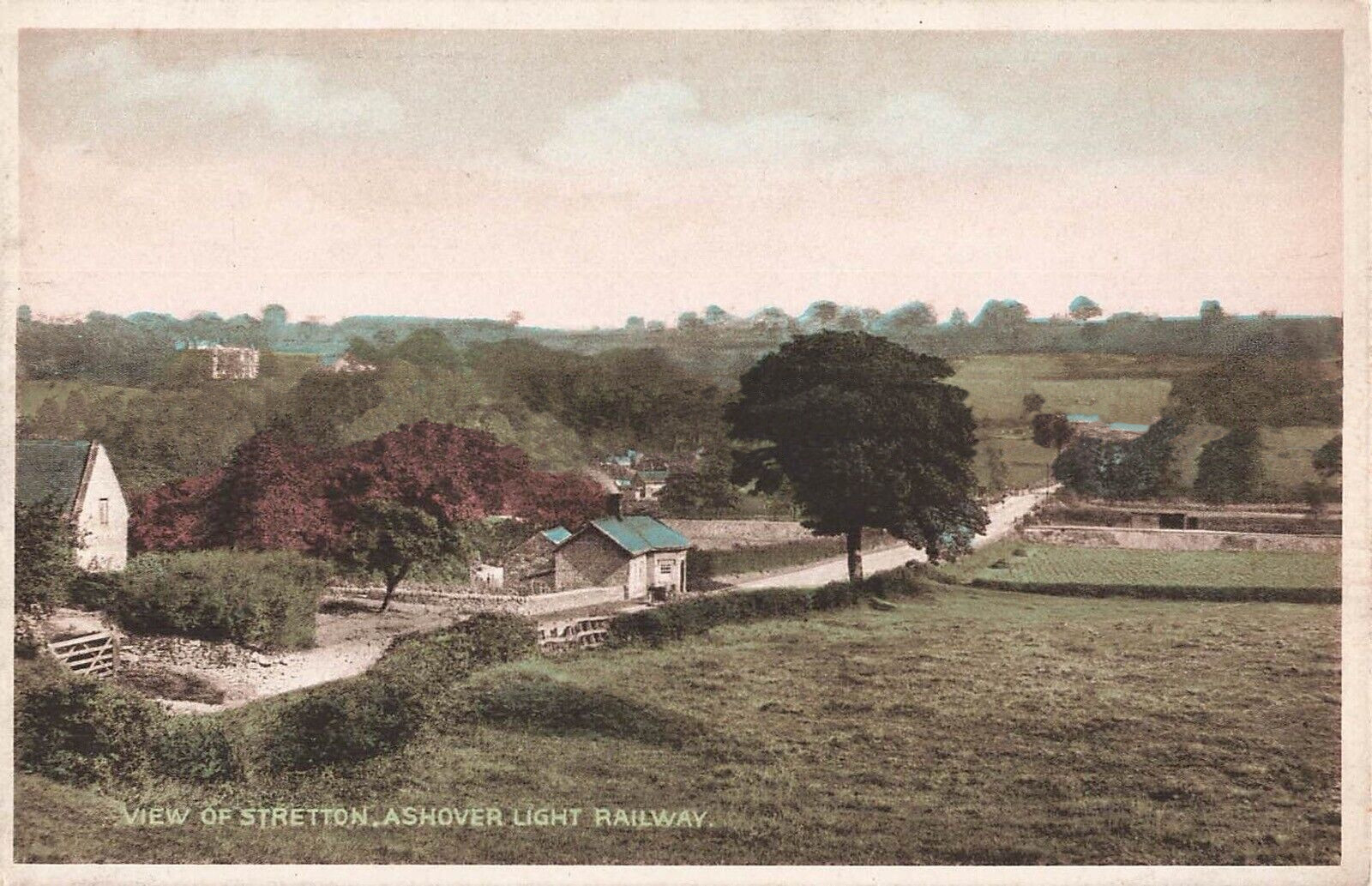
- View of Stretton, Ashover Light Railway

General information
- Location: Stretton, District of North East Derbyshire; England
- Grid reference: SK386614

Other information
- Status: Disused

History
- Original company: North Midland Railway
- Pre-grouping: Midland Railway
- Post-grouping: LMS; British Railways

Key dates
- 15 April 1841: Station opened as Smithy Moor
- 1 November 1841: renamed Stretton
- 1 October 1870: renamed Stretton for Ashover
- 1889: Station buildings enlarged
- 11 September 1961: Station closed
Location

Stretton railway station was a railway station at Stretton, Derbyshire, England built by the North Midland Railway.

== History ==
Stretton station was first opened in 1841 as Smithy Moor, a year after the line opened, but renamed later in 1841. It is also called "Shelton" in the Railway Guide.

It was situated at the Derbyshire summit and the highest point of the line, after the stations at Ambergate and Wingfield, and just before the Clay Cross Tunnel.

The first station buildings were of wooden construction, but these were later replaced by brick built station and station master's house. Shortly after this was completed, the station master's house was incorporated into the station building, and a new station master's house was provided. Although this proved adequate at the time by the 1880s, there were petitions to the Midland Railway for better facilities. In May 1888 the Midland Railway requested tenders for the reconstruction of the station buildings at Stretton. The contract was won by Mr. Slater of Derby and work was approaching completion by early 1889.

A station on the Ashover Light Railway (1 ft 11 1/2 in (597 mm) narrow gauge) from Ashover to Clay Cross was built adjoining it, and its passenger services were timed to connect with those on the North Midland.

This was mainly used to carry limestone and fluorspar to the Clay Cross Company works, but also supplied around 400 tons of ballast per week to the railway until the quarry closed in 1950.

The station closed on 11 September 1961. There are no visible remains of the station and platform but the cottage which stands next to the bridge over the railway lines that carries the B6014 was the station master's house and may have contained the ticket and parcel office.

== Accidents and incidents ==
- In 1858, the wife of Stationmaster Henry Simms, was knocked down and killed by and engine after attempting to cross the lines.

== Stationmasters ==
- Charles Broad ca. 1857 - 1858
- Henry Simms 1858 - 1862
- Thomas Jackson 1862 - 1864
- J. Taylor from 1864 (formerly station master at Desford)
- Joseph Harrison until 1875 (afterwards station master at Mansfield Woodhouse)
- Charles Gilman 1875 - 1877 (formerly station master at Grafham)
- Edward Bradley 1877 - 1905 (formerly station master at Cheltenham High Street)
- V.H. Owen 1905 - 1906
- H.J. Bunker 1906 - 1910
- Augustine Angus 1910 - 1924 (afterwards station master at Bentham)
- E.B. Bridge 1925 - 1928 (afterwards station master at Horninglow)
- Herbert Hardisty from 1928
- E.J. Bloor ca. 1948
- William P. Barlow until 1953 (afterwards station master at South Wingfield)
- P. McAnulty until 1958 (afterwards station master at Perry Barr)

Preceding station	Historical railways	Following station
Wingfield; Line open, station closed	North Midland Railway; Derby to Leeds line	Clay Cross; Line open, station closed
Hurst Lane; Line and station closed	London, Midland and Scottish Railway; Ashover Light Railway	Clay Lane; Line and station closed
