= Stonebridge Park power station =

- Country: England
- Location: Greater London
- Coordinates: 51°32′51″N 00°17′06″W
- Status: Decommissioned and demolished
- Construction began: 1913
- Commission date: 1914
- Decommission date: 1967
- Owners: London and North Western Railway (1913–22); London, Midland and Scottish Railway (1923–47); London Midland Region of the British Transport Commission (1948–63); British Railways (1963–67).
- Operator: as owner

Thermal power station
- Primary fuel: Coal
- Turbine technology: Steam turbines
- Chimneys: 2
- Cooling towers: 9 (8 wooden, 1 concrete)
- Cooling source: Circulating water

Power generation
- Units operational: 20 MW, 18 MW, and 0.2 MW (1957)
- Nameplate capacity: 25 MW (1913); 38.2 MW (1957)

Stonebridge Park power station was a private supply electricity generating station in Wembley north west London. It supplied direct current electricity to the adjacent Euston to Watford electric railway lines from 1914 to 1967.

== History ==
Stonebridge Park power station was built in 1913–14 by the London and North Western Railway to supply current to the Euston to Watford DC electric railway, then under construction through the conversion of the suburban lines. It was subsequently owned and operated by the London, Midland and Scottish Railway (1923–47), and from nationalisation in 1948 by the London Midland Region of the British Transport Commission, then by British Railways (1963–67).

Stonebridge Park power station closed in 1967. Electricity was then taken from the National Grid.

== Equipment specification ==
As originally built in 1913–14 the plant comprised 20 Babcock and Wilcox water-tube boilers feeding steam to five turbine-driven 3-phase alternators. The turbines were made by British Westinghouse and the alternators by Siemen Brothers. The total full load capacity was 25 MW; electricity was generated at 11 kV, 25 Hz. Condenser cooling was undertaken in one concrete and eight wooden cooling towers, their cooling capacity was 3.5 million gallons per hour (0.442 m^{3}/s). Make-up water was obtained from 500 ft (152 m) deep artesian wells, there was also a water storage and cooling pond. Coal was delivered via a siding off the adjacent railway. The station had two chimneys.

Trackside equipment comprised a number of sub-stations; each consisting of three six-phase rotary converters and nine single-phase static transformers, all manufactured by British Thomson-Houston. The conductor rails were positive on the outside of the track with a negative centre rail. In 1935 the electricity supply was converted to 50 Hz.

In 1946 Stonebridge Park power station generated 85,330 MWh. The maximum load sent out was 22.5 MW, the load factor was 43.3 per cent, and the thermal efficiency was 16.68 per cent.

By 1957 the power station had five chain grate boilers with a total evaporative capacity of 315,000 lb/hr (40.0 kg/s). The boilers supplied steam to 1×20 MW, 1×18 MW and a 1×0.2 MW generating sets. The maximum load was 27 MW. Stonebridge Park power station was connected to Acton Lane power station by a 22 kV circuit to allow transfer of current between the stations.

== See also ==
- List of power stations in England
- Acton Lane power station
- Neasden power station
