= Clay Lane railway station =

Former railway station in Derbyshire, England

Clay Lane

General information
- Location: Clay Cross, North East Derbyshire; England
- Coordinates: 53.162073°N 1.418805°W
- Platforms: 1

Other information
- Status: Disused

History
- Original company: London, Midland & Scottish Railway
- Pre-grouping: London, Midland & Scottish Railway
- Post-grouping: London, Midland & Scottish Railway

Key dates
- 7 April 1925: Opened
- 14 September 1936: Passenger services ended
- by 1950: Line and station closed
Location

Clay Lane railway station was a small station on the Ashover Light Railway and it served the western area of Clay Cross in North East Derbyshire, England. The station had a wooden shelter and a telephone box. It was located about a quarter of a mile from the main street in Clay Cross, near the Royal Oak public house. The points were laid for a siding, but this was never built, due to meagre goods traffic. Despite this, passenger traffic was initially good. After closure in 1950. The site was demolished and nothing remains of the station or trackbed.

Preceding station	Disused railways	Following station
Springfield, ALR; Line and station closed	London, Midland and Scottish Railway; Ashover Light Railway	Stretton; Line and station closed
Disused railways
