= Salter Lane railway station =

Disused railway station in Ashover, Derbyshire

Salter Lane

General information
- Location: Ashover, Derbyshire; England
- Coordinates: 53.1612°N 1.4808°W
- Grid reference: SK348628

Other information
- Status: Disused

History
- Original company: Ashover Light Railway

Key dates
- 7 April 1925: Opened
- 14 September 1936: Closed
Location

Salter Lane railway station co-served the village of Ashover, Derbyshire, England, from 1925 to 1936 on the Ashover Light Railway.

== History ==
The station was opened on 7 April 1925 by the Ashover Light Railway. It closed on 14 September 1936.

Preceding station	Disused railways	Following station
Ashover Butts; Line and station closed	Ashover Light Railway	Fallgate; Line and station closed
