= Springfield railway station (ALR) =

Former railway station in Derbyshire, England

Springfield

General information
- Location: Clay Cross, North East Derbyshire; England
- Coordinates: 53.162073°N 1.418805°W
- Platforms: 1

Other information
- Status: Disused

History
- Original company: London, Midland & Scottish Railway
- Pre-grouping: London, Midland & Scottish Railway
- Post-grouping: London, Midland & Scottish Railway

Key dates
- 7 April 1925: Opened
- 14 September 1936: Passenger services ended
- by 1950: Line and station closed
Location

Springfield railway station was a small station on the Ashover Light Railway and it served the western area of Clay Cross in North East Derbyshire, England. The station consisted of nothing more than a nameboard at a point where the line was crossed by a footpath. After closure in 1950 the site was demolished and nothing remains of the station or trackbed.

Preceding station	Disused railways	Following station
Holmgate; Line and station closed	London, Midland and Scottish Railway; Ashover Light Railway	Clay Lane; Line and station closed
Disused railways
