= Woolley railway station =

Former railway station in Derbyshire, England

Woolley

General information
- Location: Woolley Moor, North East Derbyshire; England
- Coordinates: 53.143524°N 1.449051°W
- Platforms: 1

Other information
- Status: Disused

History
- Original company: Ashover Light Railway

Key dates
- 7 April 1925: Opened
- 14 September 1936: Passenger services ended
- 31 March 1950: Line and station closed
Location

Woolley railway station was a small station on the Ashover Light Railway and it served the small village of Woolley Moor in North East Derbyshire, England. The station had a wooden shelter and a telephone box. As well as a platelayers hut. It was located just north of Ogston Reservoir, passenger traffic was initially good. After closure in 1950, the site was demolished and nothing remains of the station but the trackbed is visible although the section to Stretton has been submerged.

Preceding station	Disused railways	Following station
Hurst Lane; Line and station closed	London, Midland and Scottish Railway; Ashover Light Railway	Dale Bank; Line and station closed
