= Acton Lane Power Station =

Former power station in England

- Country: England, United Kingdom
- Location: London Borough of Ealing
- Coordinates: 51.5305°N 0.2559°W
- Status: Demolished
- Commission date: A 1899, B 1950
- Decommission date: A 1964, B 1983
- Owner: As operator
- Operators: METESCo (1899–1925); LPC (1925–1948); British Electricity Authority (1948–1955); Central Electricity Authority (1955–1957); Central Electricity Generating Board (1958–1983)

Thermal power station
- Primary fuel: Coal
- Cooling towers: 3 (concrete)
- Cooling source: Recirculating water

Power generation
- Units operational: A: 1 × 30 MW, B: 5 × 30 MW
- Units decommissioned: All
- Nameplate capacity: 150 MW
- Annual net output: See graph in text

Acton Lane Power Station was a power station in London NW10. The station, also known as Willesden power station, was located to the south of the Euston to Birmingham railway on a site bounded by Acton Lane, the Grand Union Canal and the Dudding Hill railway line. In later years the site was extended to the south side of the canal. The entire site is now occupied by Willesden Grid Supply Point buildings.

== History ==
The first 'A' station was built by the Metropolitan Electric Supply Company Limited (METESCo) and commissioned in 1899. It was originally called Willesden power station but was later known as Acton Lane to distinguish it from another station called Willesden power station at Taylors Lane. METESCo supplied electricity to Finsbury, Holborn, Paddington, the City of Westminster, Acton, Greenford, Hanwell, Southall and Brentford.

The commissioning of the 'A' station enabled smaller less efficient power stations in central London to be closed or reconfigured as distribution substations. These included Manchester Square, Sardinia Street, Amberley Road , Rathbone Place and Whitehall Court. See below for details.

At commissioning in late 1899 the A station was equipped with 16 10,000 Ib/hr Babcock & Wilcox water-tube boilers, fitted with superheaters. Six of the boilers are hand fired, eight are fitted with Vicars automatic stokers and the remaining two are fitted with Babcock & Wilcox chain grate stokers. These fed three Westinghouse engines driving 1,500kW 2-phase 500 Volt alternators. The output was stepped up to 10,000 Volts by transformers and fed by cables to their Central London distribution points. In 1901 a further 2 x1,500 kW sets were added. By 1904, another two 3,000 kW reciprocating sets had been added, and in that year the first turbine was put down, this being a 3,000 kW Williams—Dick Kerr unit generating at 2750 volts.

In 1903 METESCo experimented with pulverised fuel firing of some of its boilers. Coal was pulverised to a fine powder in ball mills. The advantage was intimate mixing of powdered coal and air giving better combustion and higher boiler efficiencies. In 1913 a 4,000 kW turbo alternator was installed.

In 1923 the first three-phase 50 Hz generating machinery at Willesden was installed when two 10,000 kW 3000 revolutions Parsons Turbo Alternators generating at 6,600 volts.

In 1925 a 15,000 kW three-phase 50 Hz turbo-alternator was installed, together with four Babcock marine of 50,000 Ib/hr in place of some of the original plant.

The station was taken over by the London Power Company Limited in 1925. It was one of four stations (the others being Bow, Deptford East and Grove Road Saint John's Wood) which continued following the formation of the London and Home Counties Joint Electricity Authority in 1925, which resulted in closure of many smaller stations in central London.

Following the change in ownership the LPC embarked on further expansion of the plant by removing all the remaining original boilers and sets and bringing increasing total installed capacity by a further 68,750 kW consisting of a single-cylinder 18,750 kW 1500 revolutions Richardson Westgarth turbine, with English Electric alternator, and two 25,000 kW 1500 revolutions two-cylinder British Thomson-Houston sets bringing total installed capacity to 111,750 kW from eight turbo alternator sets.

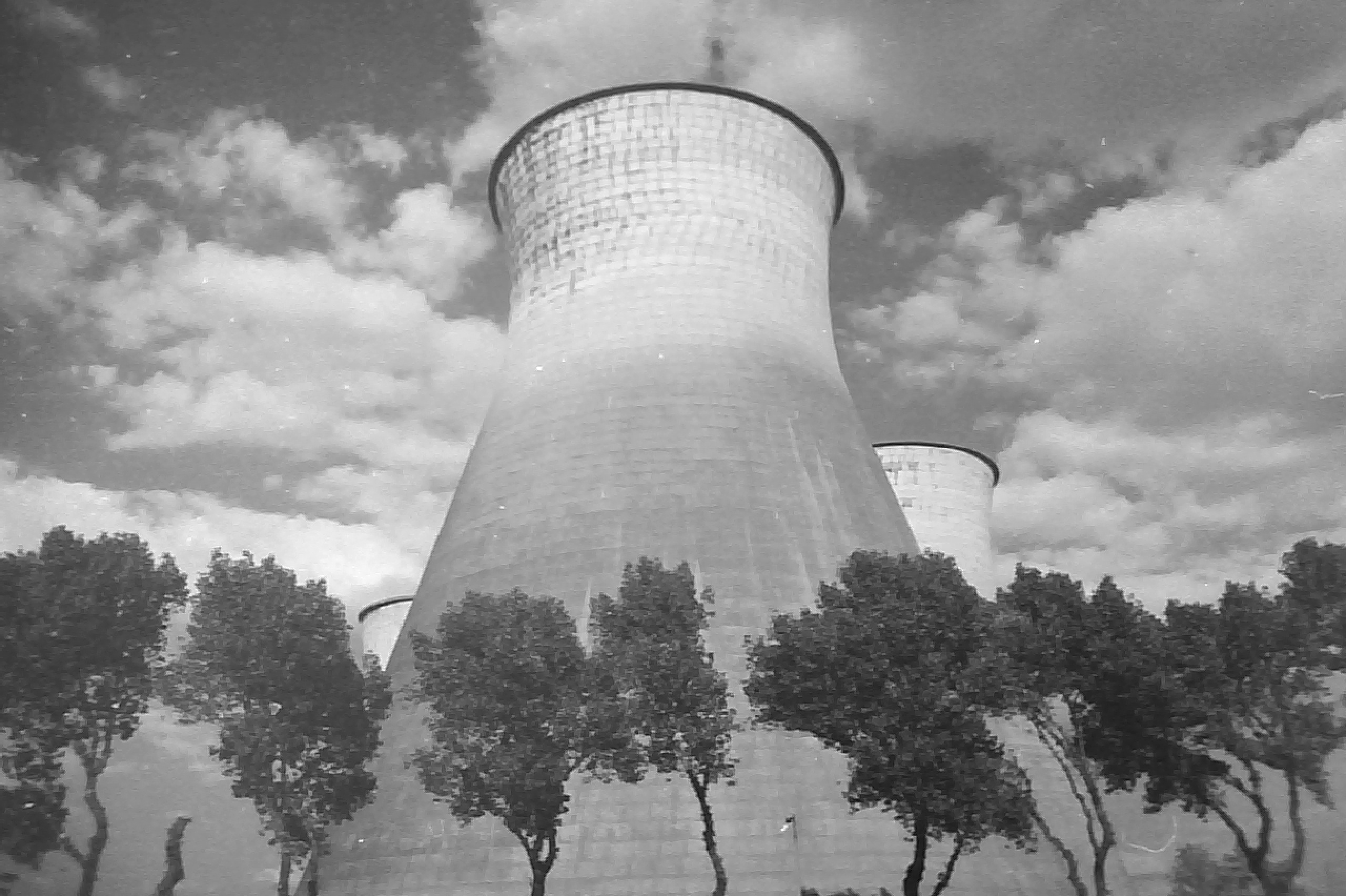
Action Lane Power Station cooling towers in the 1980s.

The later Acton Lane 'B' station had three concrete cooling towers and dominated the eastern end of North Acton trading estate at Park Royal. Work on this began in 1950, initially for 56 MW. Coal was supplied by rail to sidings from the adjacent railway to the north. Other power stations nearby included Neasden (since demolished), Taylors Lane and Stonebridge Park (demolished).

In 1967 there were complaints from boaters that ash from Acton Lane power station was silting up the Grand Union canal. The CEGB denied they were depositing ash into the canal and said that ash was taken away by lorry. It did admit that ash from another power station was deposited into the canal from another station but that this had been closed in 1958.

The station closed on 31 October 1983 with a generating capacity of 150 MW.

=== Specification ===
The 'A' station had a high pressure (HP) plant and a low pressure (LP) plant. The HP plant had an installed capacity of 30 MW comprising a single 30 MW machine.

In 1923 the generating plant at the 'A' station comprised 2 × 1,500 kW and 2 × 3,000 kW reciprocating machines and 1 × 3,000 kW, 2 × 4,000 kW and 2 × 10,000 kW steam turbines, a total generating capacity of 40 MW. The boilers had a maximum capacity of 584,000 lb/hr (73.6 kg/s) of steam. The station had a total of 49,856 connections and a maximum load of 20,442 MW, supplied through a range of current and voltages:

- 2-phase AC, 60 Hz, 100 & 200V
- 3-phase AC, 60 Hz, 415 &240V
- 3-phase AC, 50 Hz
- DC 200 & 100V, and 460 & 230V

In 1923 the station generated 38.69 GWh, and sold 29.62 GWh, providing an income of £271,812.

In 1954 the station generated 112.862 GWh. The HP boilers had an output capacity of 440,000 lb/h, and in 1954 burned 71,700 tons of coal. The LP plant had an installed capacity of 127.9 MW. In 1954 it generated 130.34 GWh. The LP boilers had an output capacity of 1,400,000 lb/h and in 1954 burned 133,300 tons of coal. The thermal efficiency of the LP plant was 14.24 per cent, compared to 22.91 per cent for the HP plant. The LP side was decommissioned in the late 1950s.

The electricity output from Acton Lane A power station was:

Electricity sent out from Acton Lane A station, GWh
Year	LP station output GWh	HP station output GWh
1946	226.47	
1953/4	143.97	117.01
1954/5	151.09	110.26
1955/6	107.83	103.41
1956/7	84.72	109.68
1957/8	38.32	77.691
1960/1		5.18
1961/2		6.00
1962/3		30.49

By its final year of operation in 1963-64 the 'A' station had 1 × 30 MW generator. It produced 28 GWh of electricity in that year. The steam capacity of the boilers was 440,000 lb/hr (55.4 kg/s). The steam conditions at the turbine stop valve was 600 psi (41.4 bar). In 1963-64 the overall thermal efficiency of the A station was 13.06 per cent.

Acton Lane B

The first two of five 30 MW 11.6kV turbo alternators were installed in 1955 were supplied by Richardson Westgarth Ltd. By 1963-64 the 'B' station had 5 × 30 MW generators. There were seven 240,000 lb/hr boilers with a total steam capacity of 1,680,000 lb/hr (211.7 kg/s). Steam conditions at the turbine stop valves was 600 psi (41.4 bar) and 454 °C. The boilers were chain grate stoked and in 1954 burned 27,100 tons of coal. In 1963-64 the overall thermal efficiency of the B station was 24.48 per cent, by the time of its closure the thermal efficiency had fallen to 14.47 per cent.

Electricity output from Acton Lane 'B' power station during its operational life was as follows.

Acton Lane B annual electricity output GWh

Willesden Feeder station on the site comprises systems operating at 400 kV to/from Kensal Green substation; 275 kV to/from Ealing substation; 132 kV from Taylors Lane power station, Neasden feeder station, White City substation, North Pole feeder station; 66 kV to Townmead Road substation, Bulwer Street substation; and 22 kV to Acton Lane, Brentham new LUL, and Kimberley Road.

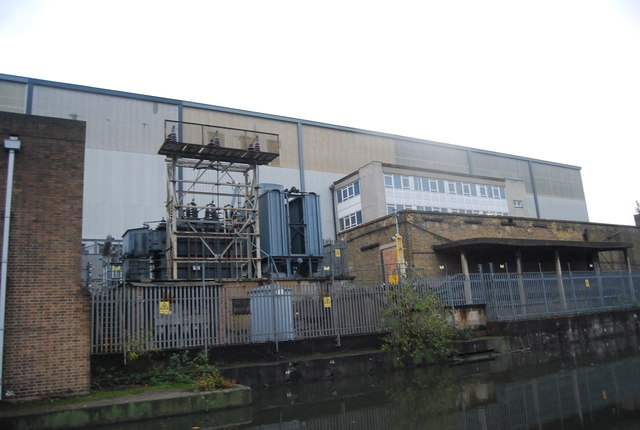
Part of Willesden Substation, as seen from the Grand Union Canal

== Film set ==
The disused power station was used as a film set in Aliens (1986) and as the 'Axis Chemical Works' in Batman (1989).

== Amberley Road power station ==
The Metropolitan Electric Supply Company Limited also owned and operated a power station at Amberley Road in Westbourne Green adjacent to the Grand Union Canal (51.522632°N 0.192518°W). The station was first commissioned in March 1893. Initial it contained five large Hornsby horizontal engines each driving a Kapp 100 kW alternator by ropes. In 1905 it contained 2,500 kW of alternating plant. In 1923 the station had four 600 kW steam turbines supplied from boilers producing 96,000 lb/hr (12.1 kg/s) of steam. The station closed in 1926. Today the site is a substation connected to Aberdeen Place substation (132 kV) and to Moscow Road substation (22 kV).

== Rathbone Place power station ==
The station was first commissioned in March 1887 as a private supply but in 1889 Metropolitan Electric Supply Company Limited acquired it. They then extended it installing five Babcock & Wilcox boilers each capable of evaporating 6,000Ib. of water per hour the working pressure being 200lb. per square inch. These supplied steam to five Willans triple expansion engines of 200 IHP each connected to 100 kW Elwell-Parker alternator. By 1905 its output was 825 kW of direct current.

== Sardinia Street power station ==
The station was commissioned in September 1889 by the Metropolitan Electric Supply Company Limited. It contained 12 Babcock and Wilcox water-tube boilers, each capable of evaporating 6,000 lb. of water per hour. These supplied steam to five 250 Hp and five 350 HP Westinghouse compound steam engines each driving a Westinghouse 125 kW alternators. The station was substantially destroyed by fire in 1895. It was rebuilt and in 1905 contained 350kw alternating current and 2, 640 kW of direct current generation.

== Manchester Square power station ==
The station was commissioned in January 1890 by the Metropolitan Electric Supply Company Limited. It contained 9 Babcock and Wilcox water-tube boilers, each capable of evaporating 6,000 lb. of water per hour. These supplied steam to ten 200 HP Willans steam engines each driving a Elwell-Parker 100 kW alternators. In 1905 the stations capacity was 700 kW alternating current 1,400 kW direct current.
