= Ashover Butts railway station =

Former railway station in Derbyshire, England

Coordinates: 53.16366°N 1.48609°W

Ashover Butts
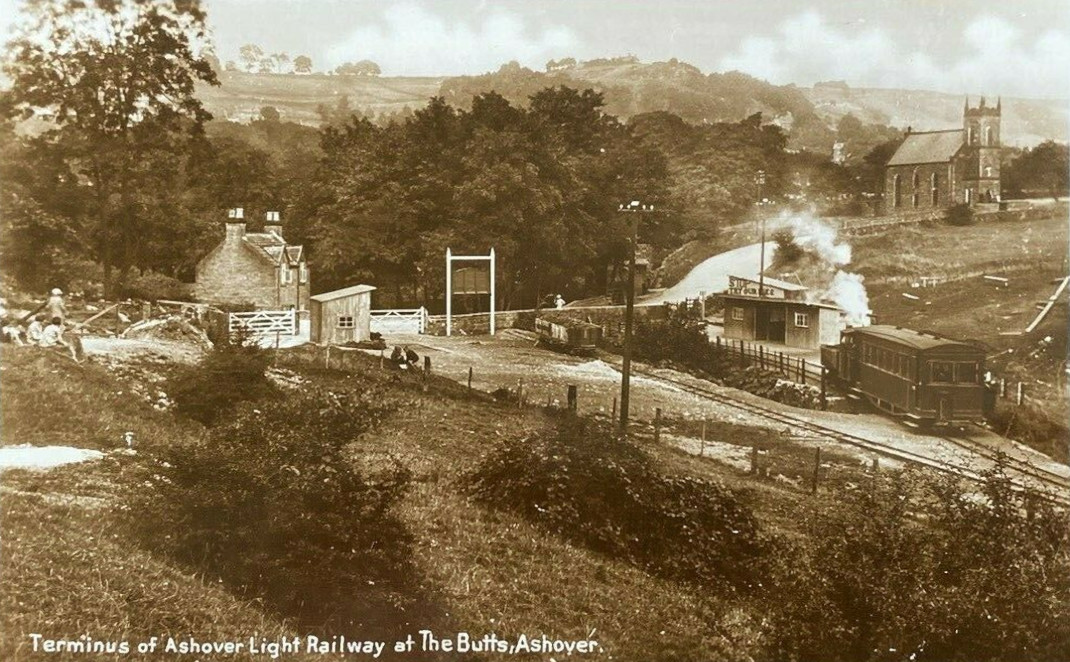

General information
- Location: Ashover, North East Derbyshire; England

Other information
- Status: Disused

History
- Original company: Ashover Light Railway
- Post-grouping: Ashover Light Railway

Key dates
- 7 April 1925: Station opens
- 14 September 1936: Passenger service ceased
- by 1950: Station closed completely
Location

Ashover Butts railway station was a railway station serving the village of Ashover in Derbyshire, England. It was the terminus of the 1 ft 11 1/2 in (597 mm) narrow gauge Ashover Light Railway.

== History ==
After an order under the Light Railways Act that had been obtained in 1918 to build a standard gauge railway between the Midland Railway station at Stretton and Ashover, was not proceeded with because the cost was too high, in 1920 Colonel H. F. Stephens proposed building the railway to 2 ft (610 mm) gauge. Construction started in 1922 and the railway opened to goods traffic in 1924. The formal opening to passenger traffic took place in March 1925. Although the line was successful at first, road competition led to traffic decline and all passenger services were withdrawn in 1936.

The mineral traffic continued until the quarry closed with the railway closed in 1950.

== Description ==
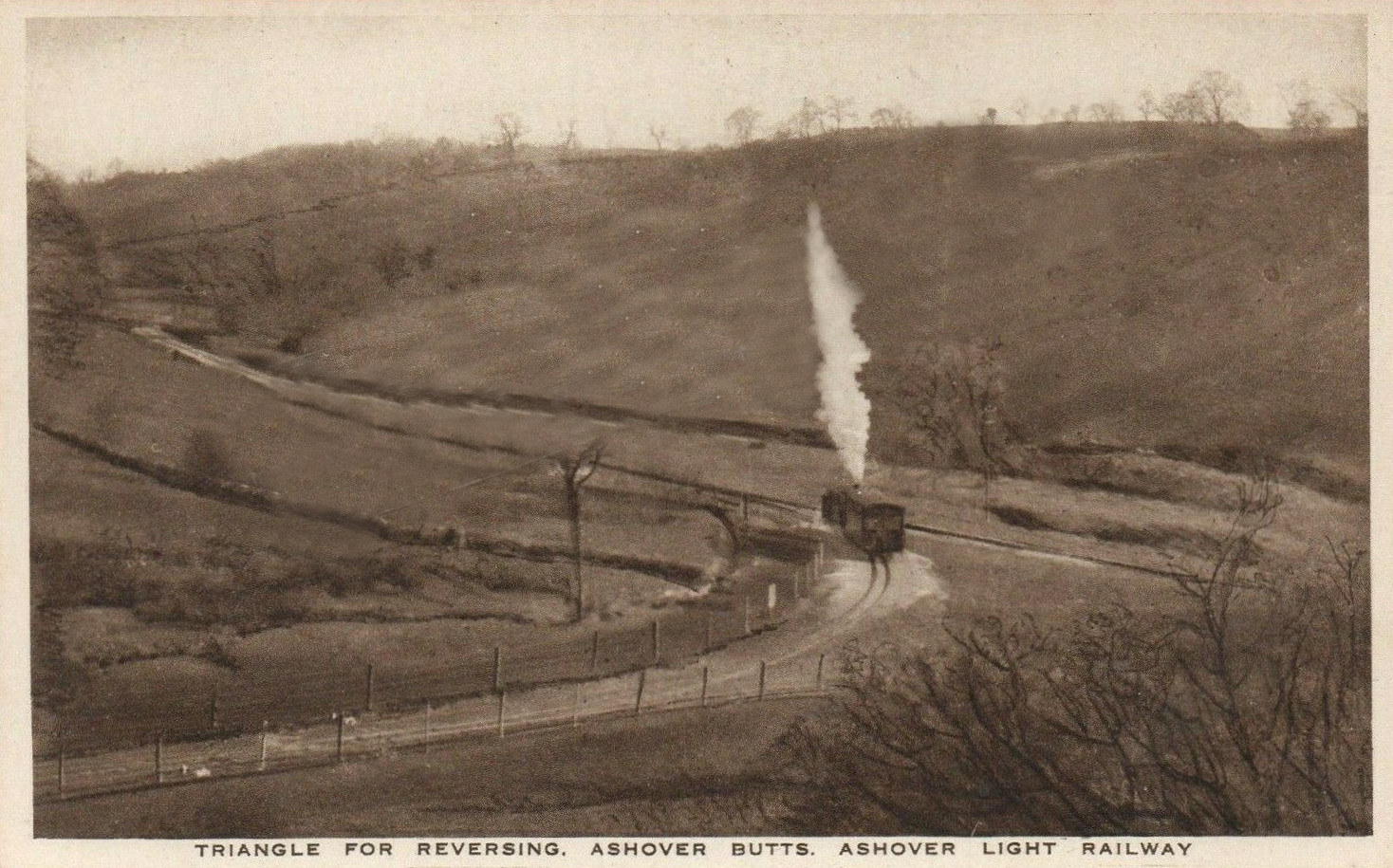
Triangle for Reversing at Ashover Butts

Ashover Butts had a single platform with a wooden building, which comprised an open-fronted shelter with an office on either side, one of which was for ticket sales. The other office briefly sold confectionery, but then stood unused for many years. Latterly, it was used to store moulds from the Butts concrete plant. In the last couple of years before passenger services ended, the building was painted grey.

| Preceding station | Disused railways | Following station |
|---|---|---|
| Salter Lane | Ashover Light Railway | Terminus |
