= Clay Cross and Egstow railway station =

Former railway station in Derbyshire, England

Clay Cross and Egstow
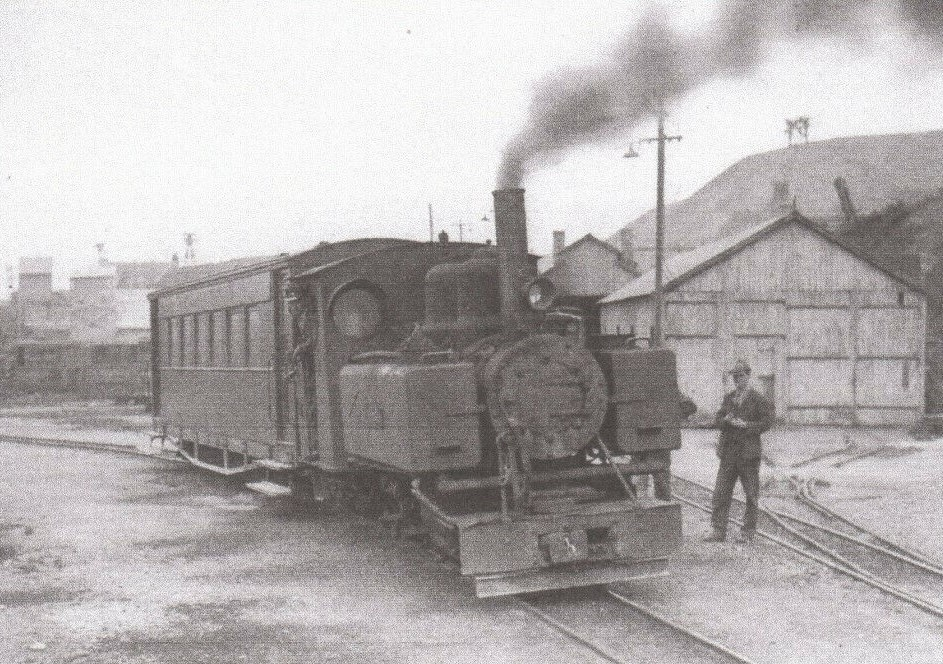
- Hummy ready for a run to Ashover at Clay Cross and Egstow station, 1931

General information
- Location: Clay Cross, North East Derbyshire; England
- Coordinates: 53.172541°N 1.407836°W
- Platforms: 1

Other information
- Status: Disused

History
- Original company: London, Midland & Scottish Railway
- Pre-grouping: London, Midland & Scottish Railway
- Post-grouping: London, Midland & Scottish Railway

Key dates
- 7 April 1925: Opened
- 14 September 1936: Passenger services ended
- by 1950: Line and station closed
Location

Clay Cross and Egstow railway station the terminus of the Ashover Light Railway and it served the Egstow area of Clay Cross, North East Derbyshire, England. The station featured an unusually large nameboard — 10 by 3 feet (3.0 m × 0.9 m) — which stood on the single low platform. There was a wooden station building consisting of an open-fronted wooden shelter with the manager's office on one side, and on the other what was intended as a parcels office but was actually used as a general storeroom. The station was the only one on the line to have electric lighting. After its closure in 1950, the site was demolished and is now occupied by a road called Bridge Street.

Preceding station	Disused railways	Following station
Chesterfield Road	Ashover Light Railway	Terminus
