= Taylors Lane Power Station =

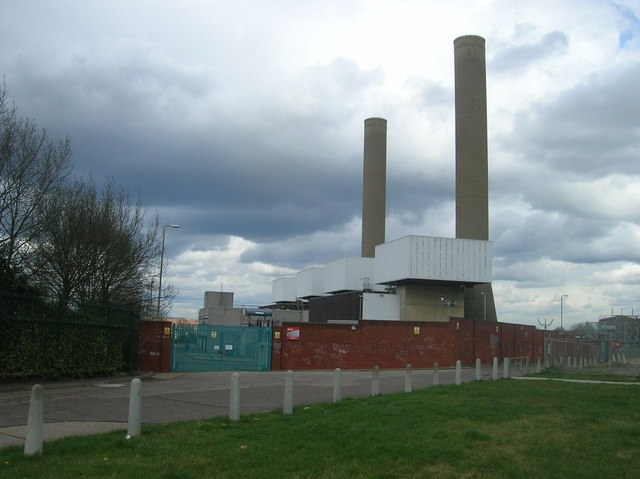
- Taylors Lane Power Station
- Country: England
- Location: Greater London
- Coordinates: 51.54600°N 0.25750°W
- Status: Coal-fired station demolished; OCGT operational
- Commission date: 1904 and 1979
- Decommission date: 1972
- Owner: Uniper
- Operators: Northmet (1904-48), British Electricity Authority (1948-55), Central Electricity Authority (1955-57), Central Electricity Generating Board (1958-72); OCGT CEGB(1979-90), PowerGen (1990-), E.On, Uniper

Thermal power station
- Primary fuel: Coal, Natural gas
- Chimneys: OCGT 2

Power generation
- Units operational: Coal-fired 2 × 32 MW
- Units decommissioned: Coal-fired all decommissioned
- Nameplate capacity: 132MW

External links
- Commons: Related media on Commons

Taylors Lane Power Station is situated in Willesden, north-west London. The first power station on the site, known as Willesden power station, was coal-fired and operated from 1904 to 1972 and was subsequently demolished. Taylors Lane is now an open cycle gas turbine (OCGT) power station built in 1979.

== History ==
The first, coal-fired, station was built in 1904 by Willesden Urban District Council and sold to the North Metropolitan Electric Power Supply Company (Northmet) in 1904. Northmet subsequently supplied Willesden Urban District Council with electricity. It was known as Willesden power station but was later called Taylors Lane to distinguish it from another Willesden power station at Acton Lane. Generating capacity increased from 300 KW in 1903, 20.25 MW in 1923, to 28.6 MW in 1937. By 1961 the installed capacity was 11.5 MW; the station produced 1.076 GWh in that year and had a thermal efficiency of 5.91 per cent.

Coal was delivered to the site by railway. There were two sidings off the Acton Branch (Dudding Hill) railway. The sidings were extant in 1990 although they had been disconnected from the railway by 2005.

This coal-fired power station closed in 1972.

=== Specification ===
In 1904 it contained four Babcock & Wilcox 12,500 lb/hr boilers feeding 2 x 300 kW and a 600 kW Ferranti generators. Shortly afterwards a 750 kW set was installed.

In 1923 the plant at Willesden (Taylors Lane) comprised 3 × 1,500 kW, 1 × 3,000 kW and 2 × 6,000 kW steam turbines providing a 3-phase AC supply. In addition there was a single 750 kW reciprocating machine producing a 460 & 230V and a 480 & 240V DC supply. The total generating capacity was 20.25 MW. The turbines and reciprocating machines were supplied with 248,000 lb/hr (31.25 kg/s) of steam from the boilers.

By 1963-64 Taylors Lane had 2 × 32 MW generators. The steam capacity of the boilers was 880,000 lb/hr (110.9 kg/s); steam conditions at the turbine stop valves was 190/1350 psi (13.1/93.1 bar) and 343/513 °C. The boilers were a mixture of chain grate stoker and pulverised fuel. In 1963-64 the overall thermal efficiency of the B station was 20.95 per cent. The first electrostatic precipitators in the UK were installed in 1929. Dust and grit were given a positive charge in an electric field then deposited on negatively charged screen or wires.

Electricity output from coal-fired power station was as follows.

Taylors Lane annual electricity output GWh

== Taylors Lane OCGT station ==
The current station was opened in 1979 by the Central Electricity Generating Board. It is now operated by Uniper. It can be operated remotely from Enfield Power Station and has two generator GEC Gas Turbine Quad Olympus units fired on gas-oil with a capacity of 132 MW. Each unit uses 4 gas generators derived from the Rolls-Royce Olympus jet engine.

The station is adjacent to the 132 kV Leicester Road Grid substation with a 132 kV underground connection to the Willesden substation.

In 2011, in the Lost episode of series 14 of the BBC thriller Silent Witness, a body is found in a lane beside the power station.
