= Chesterfield Road railway station =

Former railway station in Derbyshire, England

Chesterfield Road

General information
- Location: Clay Cross, North East Derbyshire; England
- Coordinates: 53.178140°N 1.417898°W
- Platforms: 1

Other information
- Status: Disused

History
- Original company: London, Midland & Scottish Railway
- Pre-grouping: London, Midland & Scottish Railway
- Post-grouping: London, Midland & Scottish Railway

Key dates
- 7 April 1925: Opened
- 14 September 1936: Passenger services ended
- by 1950: Line and station closed
Location

Chesterfield Road railway station was a small station on the Ashover Light Railway and it served the village of Old Tupton, near Clay Cross, North East Derbyshire, England. The station was situated just before a large bridge that went over the Chesterfield to Derby road. It had a small wooden shelter, and was accessed by a flight of steps down to the road. It was one of the busier stations on the line because buses passed at half-hourly intervals. In 1940, the wooden shelter was destroyed in a gale, and the pieces were used to construct a small store-shed at the back of the Clay Cross locomotive shed. After closure in 1950. The site was demolished and nothing remains of the station or trackbed.

Preceding station	Disused railways	Following station
Clay Cross and Egstow	London, Midland and Scottish Railway; Ashover Light Railway	Holmgate; Line and station closed
Disused railways
