= Holmgate railway station =

Former railway station in Derbyshire, England

Holmgate

General information
- Location: Clay Cross, North East Derbyshire; England
- Coordinates: 53.168179°N 1.423107°W
- Platforms: 1

Other information
- Status: Disused

History
- Original company: London, Midland & Scottish Railway
- Pre-grouping: London, Midland & Scottish Railway
- Post-grouping: London, Midland & Scottish Railway

Key dates
- 7 April 1925: Opened
- 14 September 1936: Passenger services ended
- by 1950: Line and station closed
Location

Holmgate railway station was a small station on the Ashover Light Railway and it served the Holmgate area of Clay Cross, North East Derbyshire, England. The station had a siding capable of holding around six wagons. It was provided with a small wooden shelter and a telephone box. After closure in 1950, the site was demolished and razed to the ground.

Preceding station	Disused railways	Following station
Chesterfield Road; Line and station closed	London, Midland and Scottish Railway; Ashover Light Railway	Springfield, ALR; Line and station closed
Disused railways
