= Littlemoor, Derbyshire =

Village near Chesterfield in Derbyshire, England

Coordinates: 53.164°N 1.458°W

Littlemoor
- Hamlet
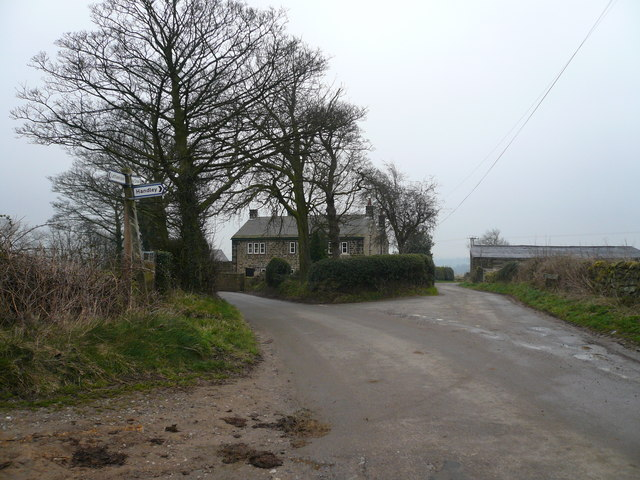
- Old School House at Junction of Deerleap Lane and Woodhead Lane.

- Location within Derbyshire
- OS grid reference: SK363631
- District: North East Derbyshire
- Shire county: Derbyshire
- Region: East Midlands
- Country: England
- Sovereign state: United Kingdom
- Post town: Chesterfield
- Postcode district: S45
- Police: Derbyshire
- Fire: Derbyshire
- Ambulance: East Midlands
- UK Parliament: North East Derbyshire

Littlemoor is a village south of Chesterfield, Derbyshire, in the civil parish of Ashover. It is the closest village to Ashover Rock (otherwise known as the Fabrick). Every year near Christmas, carol singing takes place in the village green. There is an old chapel in the centre of the village which is now a holiday home. The houses in Littlemoor are a mix of mostly bungalows and semi-detached houses.

== Governance ==
Littlemoor is in Ashover ward for elections to North East Derbyshire Borough Council.
