= Clay Cross railway station =

Former railway station in Derbyshire, England

Coordinates: 53.18150°N 1.40143°W

Clay Cross
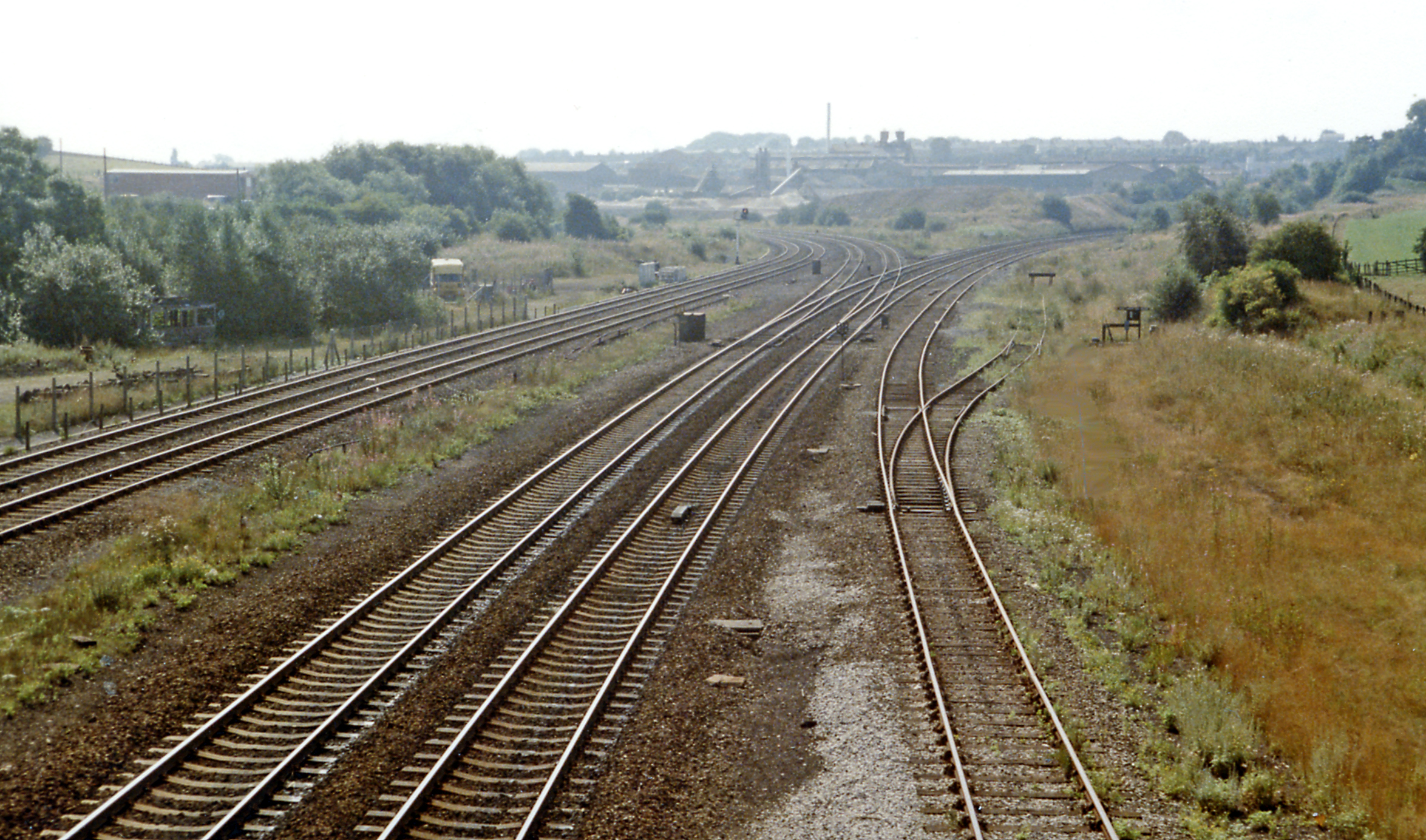
- Site of the station looking south towards the Erewash on the left and the Derby line on the right.

General information
- Location: Tupton, North East Derbyshire; England
- Grid reference: SK401651
- Platforms: 4

Other information
- Status: Disused

History
- Original company: North Midland Railway
- Pre-grouping: Midland Railway
- Post-grouping: LMS; British Railways

Key dates
- 11 May 1840: Opened
- 1967: Closed
Location

Clay Cross railway station was a railway station built by the North Midland Railway in 1840. It served the town of Clay Cross in Derbyshire, England.

It was originally planned to have been built within the Clay Cross Tunnel, however it was clear that it would be impossible to ventilate it effectively, so instead it was built at the northern entrance - nearer to Tupton.

The original station was the usual Francis Thompson Italianate design.

The station was the site of a fatal accident on 19 May 1851 which killed two people and injured sixteen others. The locomotive of a passenger train which left Derby at 21:05 for Leeds suffered a broken pump-rod. The driver stopped near Clay Cross station to remove the broken part and the rear of his train was hit by a goods train and smashed into the last two carriages. At an inquest, the jury reached a verdict of manslaughter against the driver of the goods train, Samuel Stretton, but also condemned the railway company practice of allowing a goods train to follow a passenger train with a gap of only five minutes, the lack of a night signalman at Clay Cross, and the regular practice of allowing trains to stop at stations which were not listed in the timetable.

The Erewash Valley line opened on 1 May 1862 and had its northernmost connection at Clay Cross.

In 1877 the Midland Railway went out to tender for the rebuilding of the station. The alterations for the additional traffic resulting from the Erewash Valley Line were completed by January 1878. A link line from Clay Cross South Junction to Clay Cross North Junction comprised a double line each for goods and passenger traffic from the Sheffield junction at Tapton, north of Chesterfield, to the junction of the Erewash Valley branch south of Clay Cross. The station was rebuilt in the Midland Railway styles and the platforms were improved. An additional platform was added for the Erewash Valley trains. Three large platforms were opened, one outside the outer lines and a large on in the centre, connected by covered staircases and bridges so as to enable passengers to cross the line in safety.

The station closed in 1967 and was subsequently demolished. No trace remains of the station, but the goods shed is still in place on the south side of the bridge.

North of Clay Cross, there developed very busy coal sidings, particularly those serving the Avenue Coal Carbonisation Plant. A locomotive shed was built at Hasland in 1861 with at one time as many as sixty engines. In the 1960s it supported sixteen Garratt 2-6-0+0-6-2 locomotives used for the coal traffic from Yorkshire.

The next station northwards was at Chesterfield.

== Stationmasters ==
An early station master, Robert Jeffreys, was badly injured on 8 January 1864. He was at the Lings incline and got into a coal wagon with others. As they were descending a pin holding the brake broke and they descended at great speed. Jeffreys jumped off, but it was dark, and he was badly injured in the fall. He was found and attended at the stationmaster's house by Dr. Walker, the Midland Railway company surgeon. The injuries seem to have been the likely cause of him leaving Clay Cross in summer 1864 to become an inspector of goods traffic between Leeds and Lancaster.

- Robert Jeffreys ca. 1856 - 1864
- Richard Eaton from 1864 - 1869 (formerly station master at Coalville, afterwards station master at Staveley)
- J. Clarke 1869 (formerly station master at Staveley)
- S.A. Clements 1872 - 1874
- H. Shewring 1874 - 1875
- A. Jenkins 1875
- K.C. Lewis 1876 - 1877
- J.W. Lee 1877 - 1878
- J. Smith 1878 - 1879
- J. Cole 1879 - 1880
- J.E. White 1880 - 1881
- John Charles Hayes 1881 - 1900
- Joseph Butterworth 1900 - 1907 (afterwards station master at Sheepbridge)
- William Samuel Orchard 1907 - 1911 (formerly station master at Desborough, afterwards station master at Newark)
- Herbert M. Read 1911 - 1924 (afterwards station master at Keighley)
- Abraham Fearn 1924 - 1927 (formerly station master at Settle)
- W.C. Randall 1928 - 1936 (afterwards station master at Lichfield City)
- A.H. Nicklin from 1936 (formerly station master at Westhouses)
- J.A. Mason 1943 - 1950 (afterwards station master at Mallom)

Preceding station	Historical railways	Following station
Smithy Moor; Line open, station closed	North Midland Railway; Derby to Leeds line	Chesterfield; Line open, station open
Stretton; Line open, station closed	Midland Railway; Derby to Leeds line	Chesterfield; Line open, station open

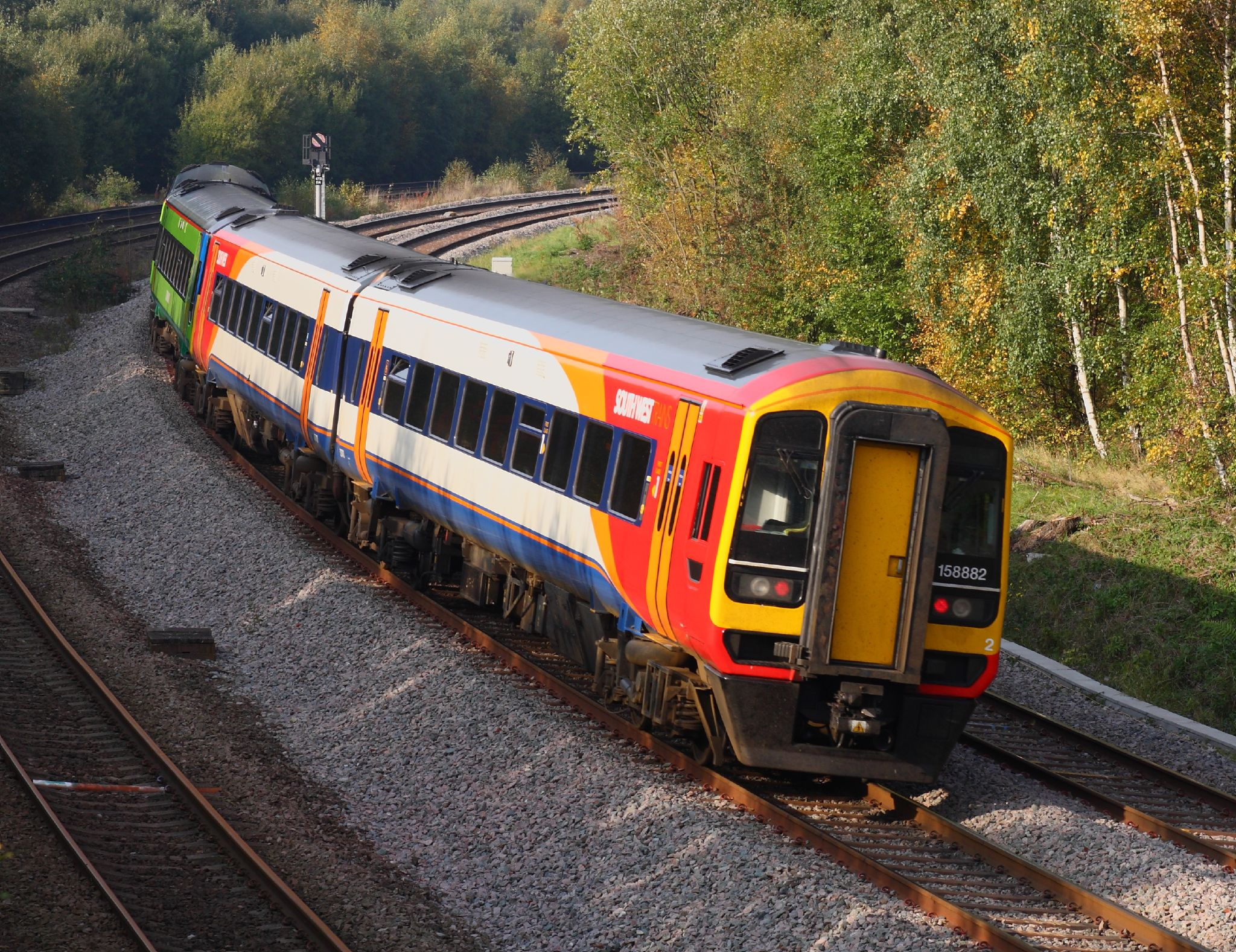
South West Trains Class 158 unit 158882, on loan to East Midlands Trains, tails another class 158 unit in Central Trains livery past the site of Clay Cross station.

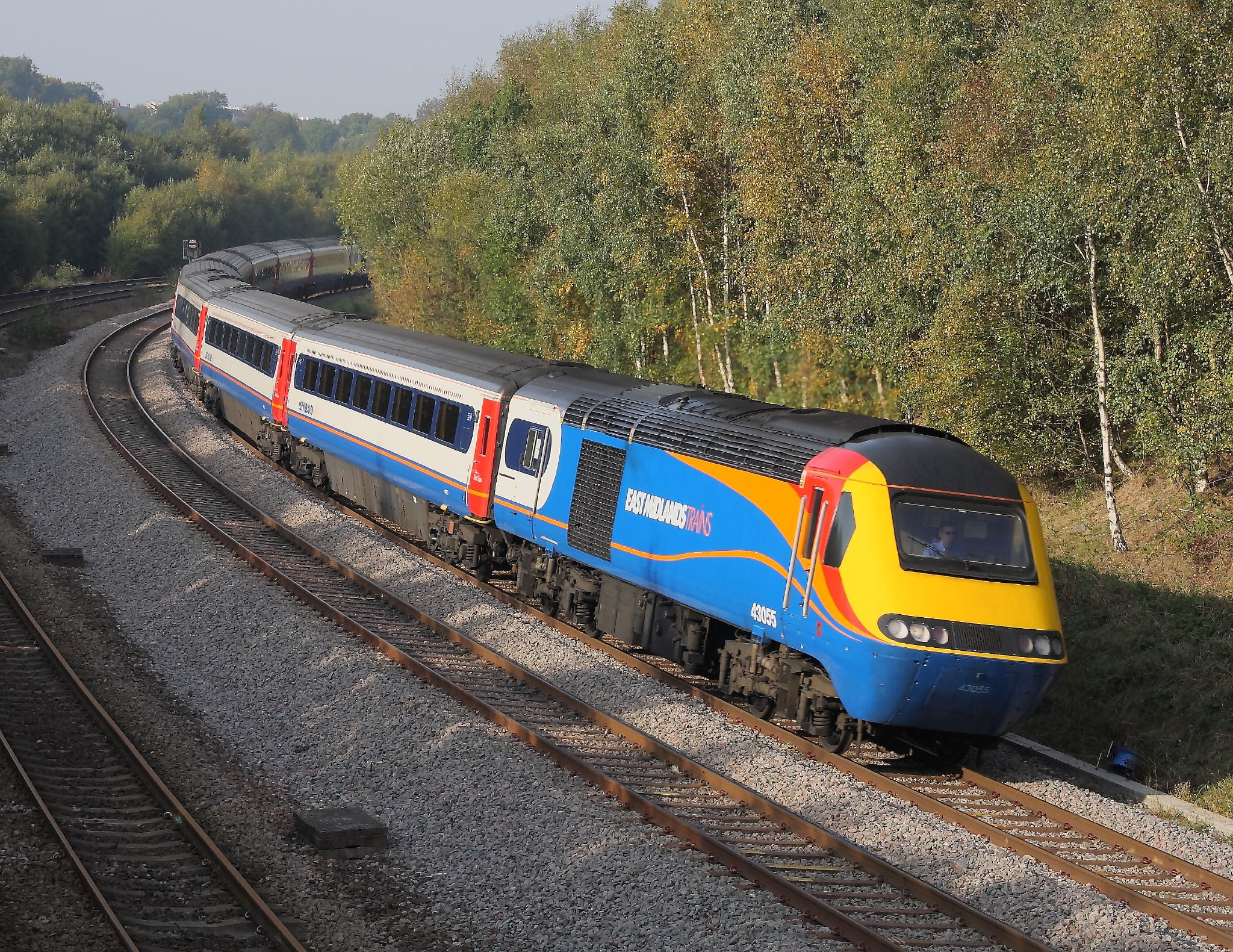
East Midlands Trains InterCity 125, hauled by power car 43055, speeds past the site of the station, with a service from London St. Pancras to Leeds
