= Fallgate railway station =

Disused railway station in Milltown, Derbyshire

Fallgate
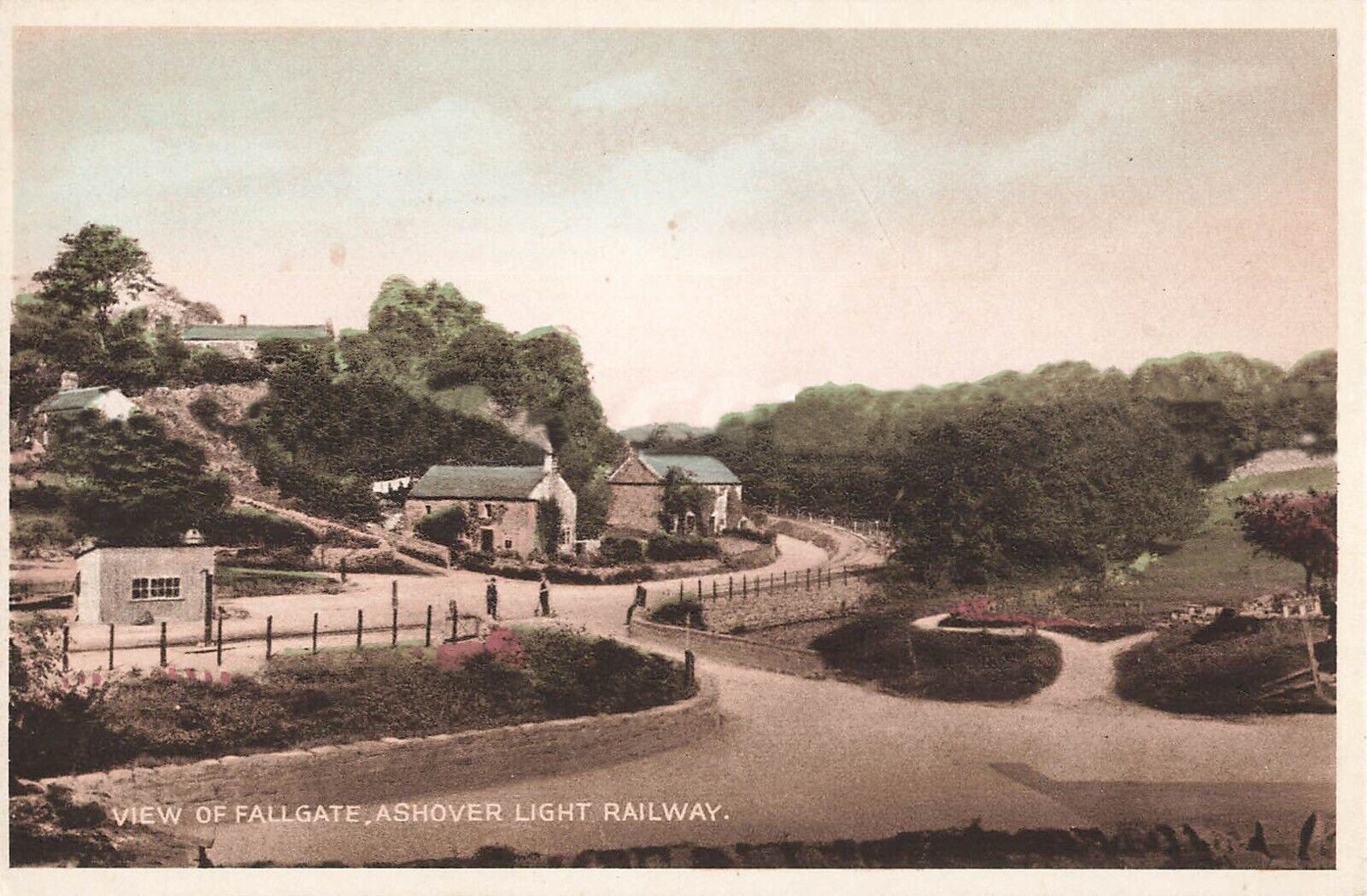
- Fallgate

General information
- Location: Milltown, Derbyshire; England
- Coordinates: 53.1546°N 1.4694°W
- Grid reference: SK355620

Other information
- Status: Disused

History
- Original company: Ashover Light Railway

Key dates
- 7 April 1925: Opened
- 14 September 1936: Closed
Location

Fallgate railway station co-served the village of Milltown, Derbyshire, England, from 1925 to 1936 on the Ashover Light Railway.

== History ==
The station was opened on 7 April 1925 by the Ashover Light Railway. It closed on 14 September 1936.

| Preceding station | Disused railways | Following station |
|---|---|---|
| Salter Lane; Line and station closed | Ashover Light Railway | Dale Bank; Line and station closed |
