= Immanuel Bourne =

English cleric

Immanuel Bourne (1590–1672) was an English cleric.

== Life ==
Bourne, born on 27 December 1590, was the eldest son of the Rev. Henry Bourne, who was vicar of East Haddon, Northamptonshire, from 1595 till his death in 1649 (Bridges's Northamptonshire, i. 506). He was educated at Christ Church, Oxford, and proceeded B.A. 29 Jan. 1611-12 and M.A. 12 June 1616. Soon afterwards he was appointed preacher at St. Christopher's Church, London, by the rector, Dr. William Piers, a canon of Christ Church. Bourne found a patron in Sir Samuel Tryon, an inhabitant of the parish of St. Christopher, and he dates one of his sermons—The True Way of a Christian—"from my study at Sir Samuel Tryon's in the parish of St. Christopher's, April 1622."

In 1622 he received the living of Ashover, Derbyshire, where he exhibited strong sympathy with the puritans. In 1642, on the outbreak of the English Civil War, his open partisanship with the Presbyterians compelled him to leave Ashhover for London. There he was appointed preacher at St. Sepulchre's Church, and about 1656 he became rector of Waltham-on-the-Wolds, Leicestershire, where he engaged in controversy with the Quakers and Anabaptists.

He conformed at the Restoration, and on 12 March 1669-70 was nominated to the rectory of Aylestone, Leicestershire, where he died on 27 Dec. 1672. He was buried in the chancel of the church.

== Bourne's works ==
- 'The Rainbow, Sermon at St. Paul's Cross. 10 June 1617, on Gen. ix. 13,' London, 1617; dedicated to Robert, first Baron Spencer of Wormleighton.
- 'The Godly Man's Guide, on James iv. 13,' London, 1620.
- 'The True Way of a Christian to the New Jerusalem ... on 2 Cor. v. 17,' London, 1622.
- 'Anatomy of Conscience,' Assize Sermon at Derby, on Rev. xx. 11, London, 1623.
- 'A Light from Christ leading unto Christ, by the Star of His Word; or, a Divine Directory for Self-examination and Preparation for the Lord's Supper,' London, 1645, 8vo. An edition, with a slightly altered title-page and significantly expanded text (from 60 pages to 687,) appeared in 1646.
- 'Defence of Scriptures,' to which was added a 'Vindication of the Honour due to the Magistrates, Ministers, and others,' London, 1656. This work describes a disputation between clergymen and James Nayler, the quaker. Bourne's argument against the quaker was answered by George Fox in 'The Great Mystery of the Great Whore unfolded,' 1659.
- 'Defence and Justification of Ministers' Maintenance by Tithes, and of Infant Baptism, Humane Learning, and the Sword of the Magistrate, in a reply to a paper by some Anabaptists sent to Im. Bourne,' to which was added 'Animadversions upon Anth. Perisons [Parsons] great case of tithes,' London, 1659.
- 'A Gold Chain of Directions with 20 Gold Links of Love to preserve Love firm between Husband and Wife,' London, 1669. Only the works marked 1, 3, and 4 in this list are in the British Museum Library.
