= Alicehead =

Coordinates: 53.190°N 1.501°W

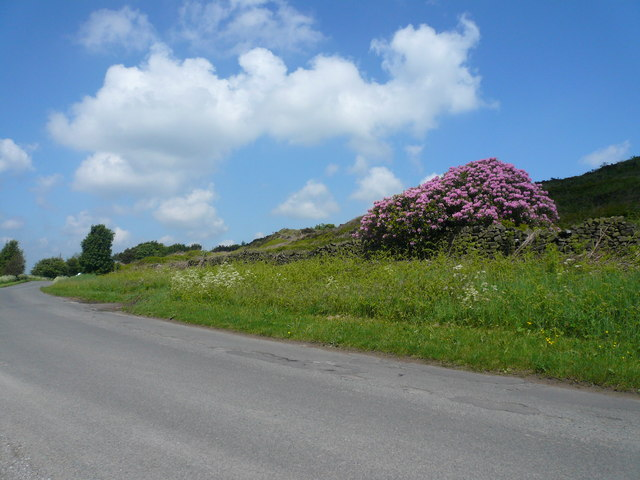
- Alicehead Road.

- Location within Derbyshire
- OS grid reference: SK334659
- District: North East Derbyshire
- Shire county: Derbyshire
- Region: East Midlands
- Country: England
- Sovereign state: United Kingdom
- Post town: CHESTERFIELD
- Postcode district: S45
- Police: Derbyshire
- Fire: Derbyshire
- Ambulance: East Midlands

Alicehead is a small area of settlement in Derbyshire, England, 9 miles (14 km) south-west of Chesterfield. It consists of four farms and a cottage on Alicehead Road, close to the junction of Darley Road and the A632. The area contains 1.9 hectares (4.7 acres) of upland heathland. The population of the settlement was only minimal at the 2011 Census. Details are included in the civil parish of Ashover.
