= Milltown Methodist Church =

Coordinates: 53°08′45″N 1°28′01″W

Milltown Chapel
- Milltown Methodist Church, Ashover Hay Primitive Methodist Chapel
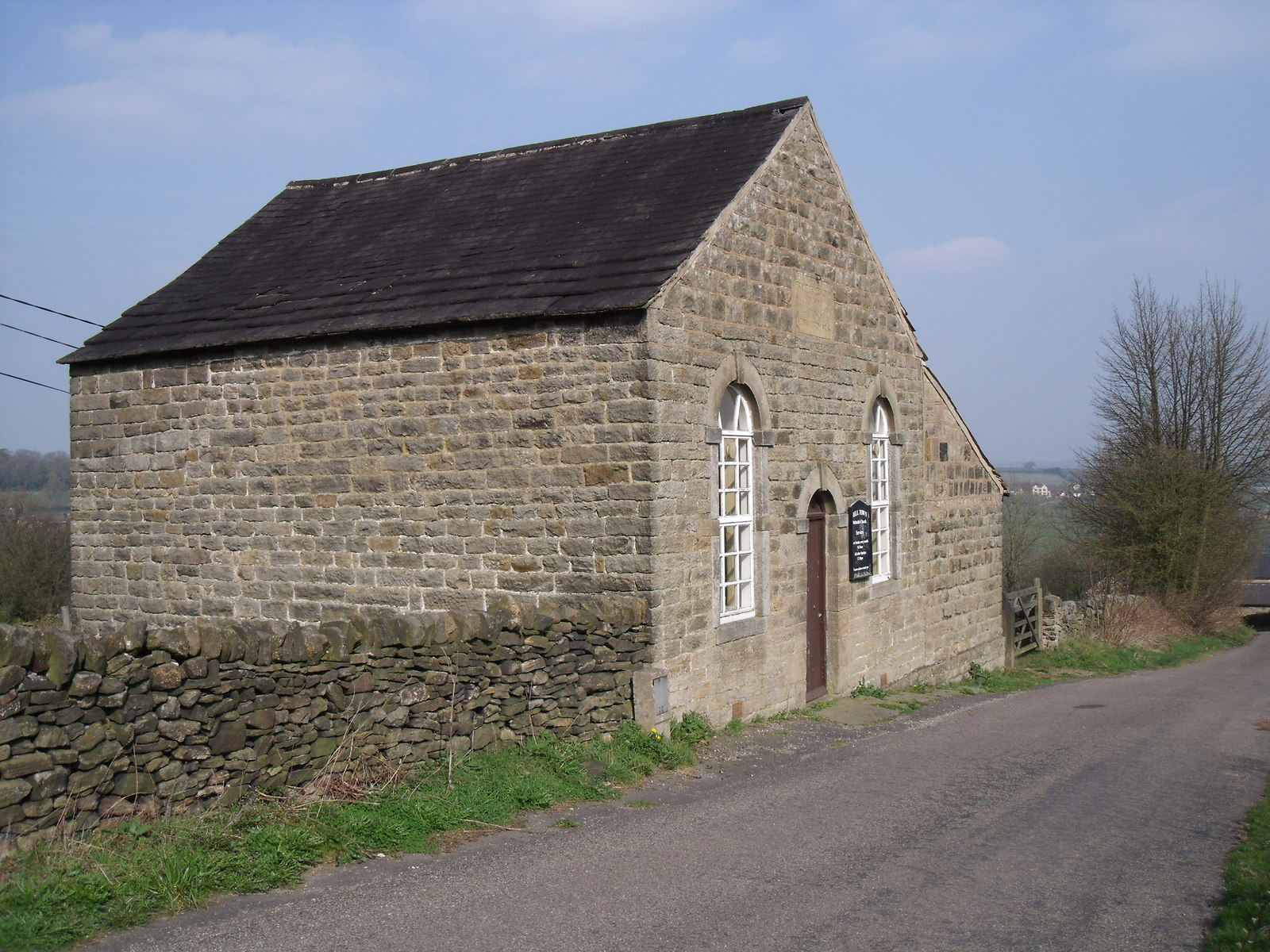
- The Chapel in 2011
- Milltown Chapel
- Denomination: Methodist

History
- Founded: 1824

Architecture
- Functional status: Defunct
- Heritage designation: Grade II
- Designated: 30 August 1995
- Closed: after 2007

Milltown Methodist Church (known alternatively as Milltown Chapel, Milltown Primitive Methodist Chapel and Ashover Hay Primitive Methodist Chapel) is a now-closed, listed Methodist chapel in the village of Milltown, Derbyshire.

The chapel was founded by Hugh Bourne who formed a society in the district. The building, which also has a graveyard (though this no longer present), was opened in 1824, and was expanded in 1870. The building is built from coursed gritstone with a roof of Welsh slate.

The chapel became Grade II listed in 1995. Worship ceased at an unrecorded date after c. 2007.
