= Hurst Lane railway station =

Disused railway station in Ogston, North East Derbyshire

Hurst Lane

General information
- Location: Ogston, North East Derbyshire; England
- Coordinates: 53.14°N 1.4389°W
- Grid reference: SK376604

Other information
- Status: Disused

History
- Original company: Ashover Light Railway

Key dates
- 7 April 1925: Opened
- 14 September 1936: Closed
Location

Hurst Lane railway station served the hamlet of Ogston, North East Derbyshire, England, from 1925 to 1936 on the Ashover Light Railway.

== History ==
The station was opened on 7 April 1925 by the Ashover Light Railway. It was known as Hurst Lane for Ogston Hall in the Derby Daily Telegraph. It was a request stop. It closed on 14 September 1936.

Preceding station	Disused railways	Following station
Stretton; Line and station closed	Ashover Light Railway	Woolley; Line and station closed
