= Clay Cross Tunnel =

Railway tunnel in Derbyshire, England

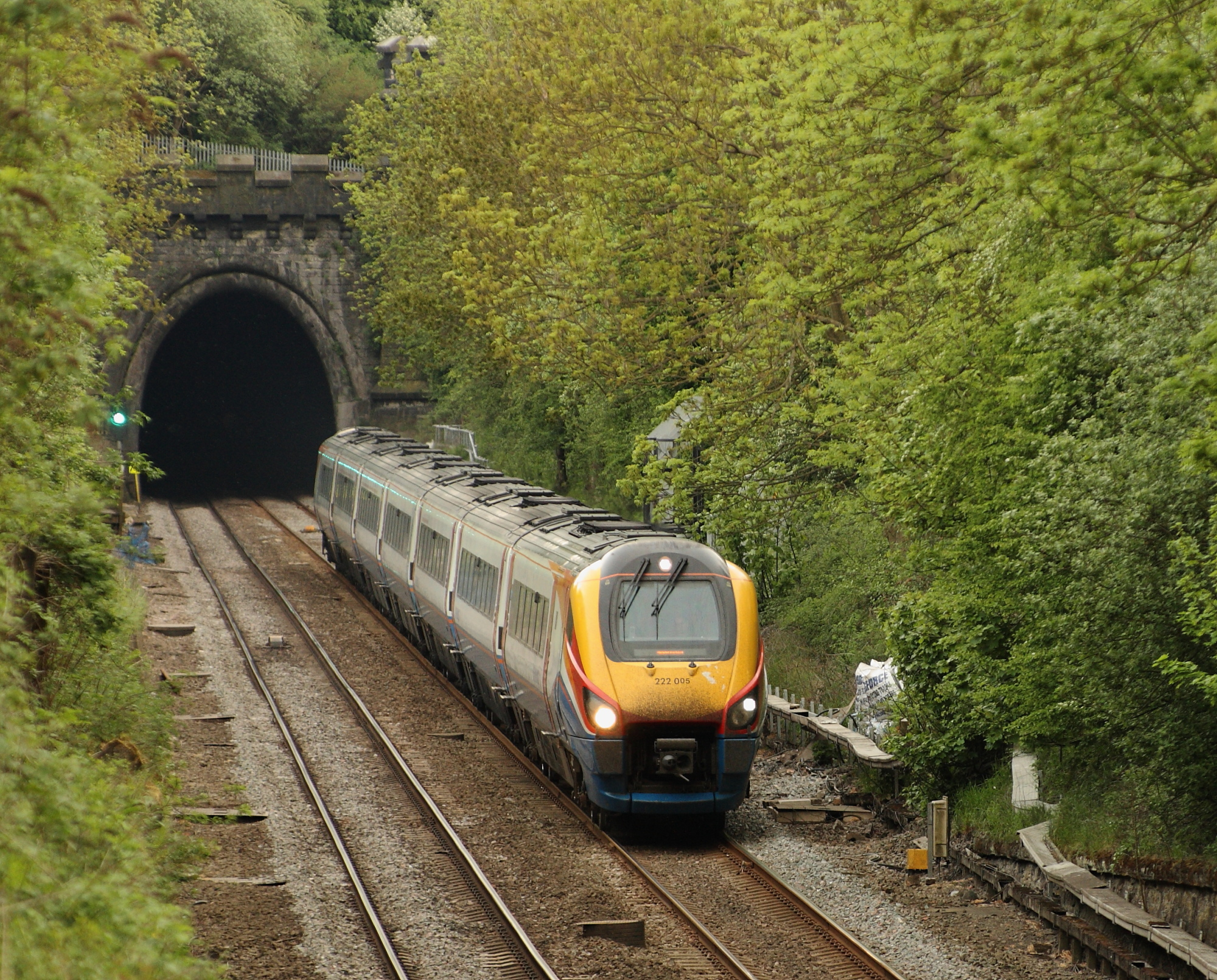
- An East Midlands Trains Meridian service leaving the tunnel
- Interactive map of Clay Cross Tunnel

Overview
- Line: Midland Main Line
- Location: Clay Cross, Derbyshire
- Coordinates: 53.16359°N 1.41514°W

Operation
- Work began: 2 February 1837
- Opened: 18 December 1839
- Owner: Network Rail

Technical
- Design engineer: George Stephenson
- Length: 1,784 yards (1,631 m)
- Track gauge: 1,435 mm (4 ft 8 1/2 in) standard gauge

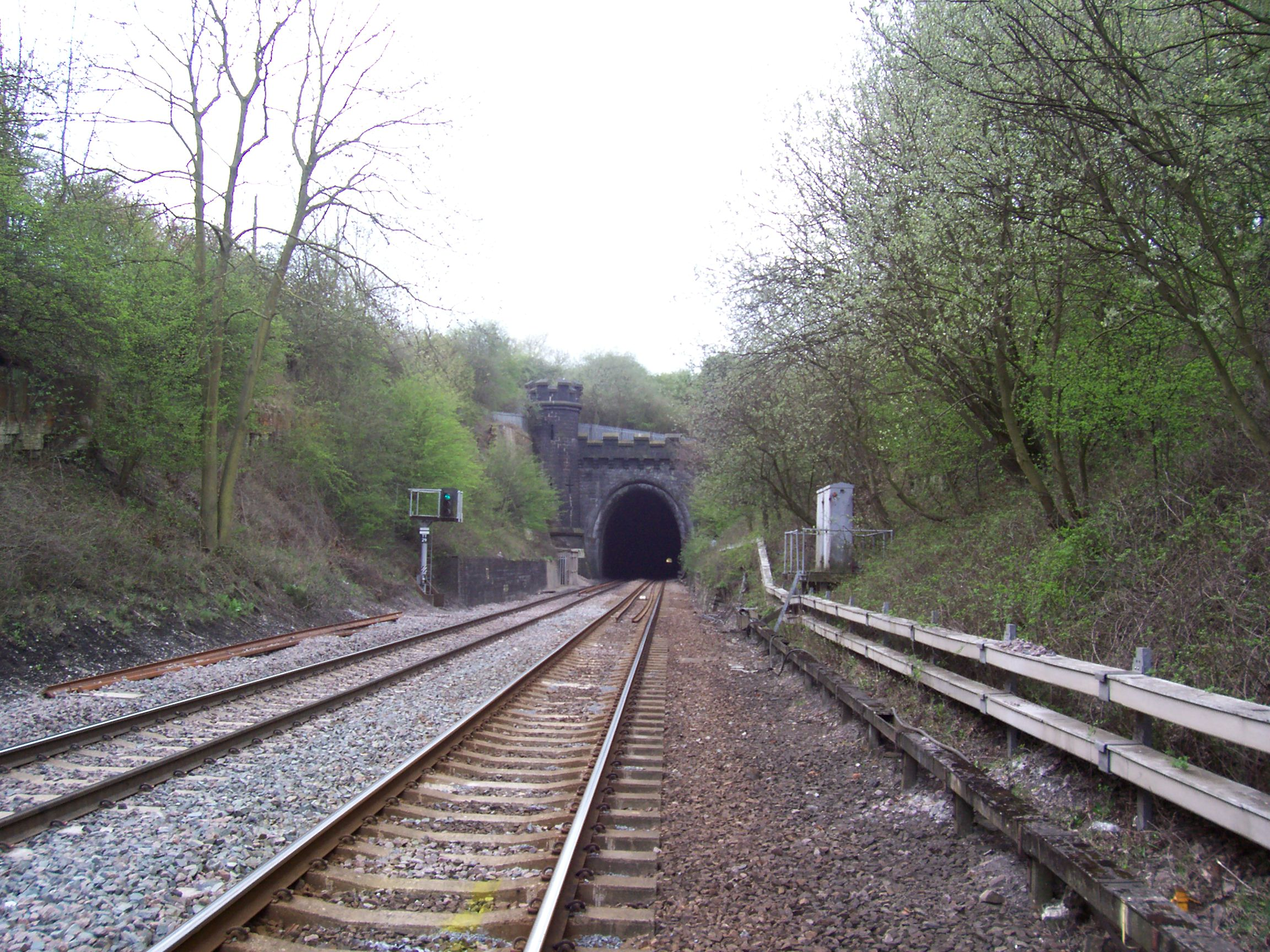
The northern portal of Clay Cross Tunnel

Clay Cross Tunnel is a 1,784 yards (1,631 m) tunnel on the Midland Main Line line near Clay Cross in Derbyshire, England. It was the most substantial single civil engineering feature present on the North Midland Railway and was one of the more ambitious railway tunnels to be built during the early development of Britain's railway network.

Built to a design produced by the pioneering railway engineers George Stephenson and Robert Stephenson, the tunnel was constructed between February 1837 and August 1839 at a total cost of £105,460. Mid-way through the tunnel's excavation, the alignment had to be changed due to previously undiscovered seams of coal as well as iron ore; their presence led to the creation of a neighbouring colliery and iron works by George Stephenson. Many elements of the tunnel, such as the Grade II listed portals, have remained unaltered since their completion.

== Construction ==
During the late 1830s, construction of the North Midland Railway was underway. Seeking to avoid steep gradients along the line, it became apparent that a tunnel would be required near to Clay Cross. It was designed by the accomplished civil engineers George Stephenson and Robert Stephenson along with their assistant engineer Frederick Swanwick. The tunnel was originally estimated to cost £96,000 to construct. Following the completion of design work during November 1836, tenders for the work were issued by the North Midland Railway one month later. The contractors appointed for the project were Messrs. Hardy, Copeland and Cropper of Watford, who would construct the tunnel, including the cutting and excavation, for the sum of £105,400 (equivalent to £10,200,000 in 2025), and construction commenced in February 1837.

The excavation of the tunnel was impacted by unexpected geological factors; both rich seams of coal seams and quantities of iron ore were encountered. As a result of this discovery, the alignment of the tunnel was changed. Another consequence of this discovery was George Stephenson's decision to open a colliery and iron works nearby, establishing a new company, George Stephenson and Co., subsequently renamed the Clay Cross Company, to exploit it. It would be a major local employer for the next 150 years.

Construction began on 2 February 1837 when the first sod was turned for the sinking of the ventilation shaft in the centre of the tunnel. The boring of the tunnel was not straightforward, eventually costing £140,000 (equivalent to £12,560,000 in 2025), instead of the expected £98,000 (equivalent to £8,790,000 in 2025), with the loss of fifteen lives.

The tunnel was to be 29 feet (8.8 m) wide and 25 feet 11 inches (7.90 m) high with a bed of broken stone at the base 4 feet (1.2 m) deep to form the rail bed. The tunnel was to be arched completely round with brickwork laid in Roman cement 18 inches (46 cm) deep in the roof and walls, and 14 inches (36 cm) deep in the floor. Approximately 15 million bricks were required for the tunnel lining. The greatest depth below the surface was about 48 yards (44 m). The tunnel bore was 1631m in length. A contract drawing shows the width of the tunnel bore to be 29ft at its widest point, and 25ft 11inches from the track bed to the roof of the tunnel.

During August 1839, it was reported that excavation of the tunnel had been completed, and the final brick was expected to be laid within a few days. However, according to the railway historian Cliff Williams, the tunnel was not actually completed until 18 December 1839.

== Description ==
It begins at the former Derbyshire summit of the line, also the highest point of the whole line, just after the old Stretton railway station. Situated at the watershed of the rivers Amber and Rother. Clay Cross is directly above it and there are ventilation shafts in Market Street (around which the council have placed seats) and High Street (some 150 feet (46 m) above the line).

The northern portal features a Moorish-inspired aesthetic and is presently a Grade II listed structure. It has castellated embattlements and a pair of tapering octagonal towers. These towers, which have sloping ashlar bases, feature decoratively arrowslits. The portal itself ia an elliptical arch with rounded mouldings and projecting castellated parapets. It is composed of rock-faced stone and ashlar.

The south portal, which is also Grade II listed, comprises an arch is formed of two ashlar bands of roll moulding profile. The portal is flanked by broad masonry buttresses, beyond which are extensive masonry retaining walls. It is composed of squared quarry-faced Derbyshire gritstone with both moulded and tooled ashlar gritstone dressings. The design was similar to that of other tunnels designed by the Stephensons for the line, including the south portal of the Milford Tunnel and both portals of the Wingfield Tunnel.

Clay Cross railway station was at the northern end, where the line was met by that from the Erewash Valley.

The tunnel saw one of the first uses of the absolute block signalling system, maybe after a narrow escape on the south-bound inaugural journey. The train was heavier than expected and a pilot engine was provided at the rear. This was detached at the entrance to the tunnel, but halfway through the train came to a halt, and someone had to walk back for the pilot, to the consternation of the passengers. Stephenson had been shown the system by its inventor William Fothergill Cooke supported by Wheatstone of the Wheatstone bridge fame. This was the forerunner of the Midland Railway's system.

== See also ==
- Listed buildings in Clay Cross
