= Clay Cross Company =

Former industrial enterprise in Derbyshire, England

Coordinates: 53.170°N 1.397°W

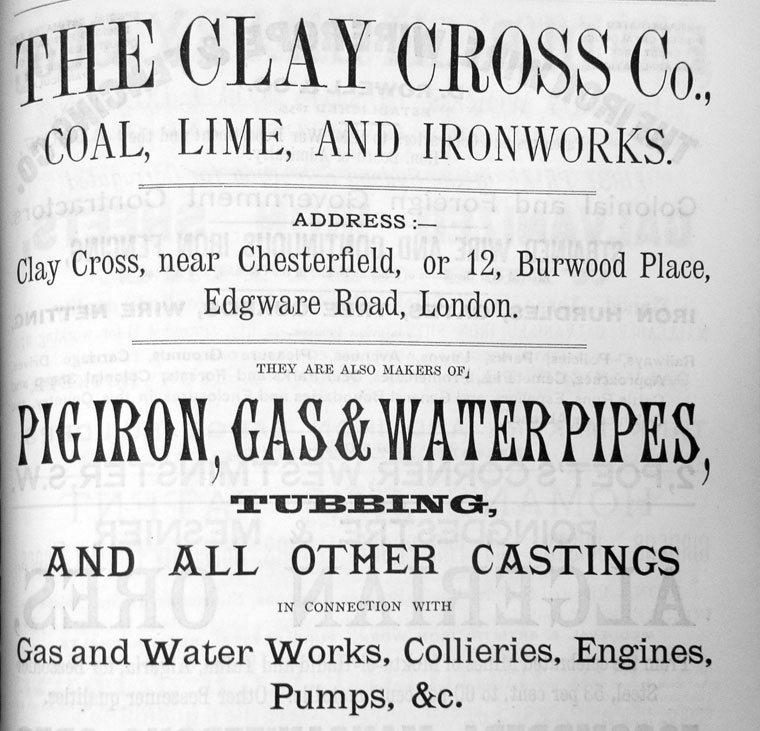
- 1881 Advert
- Formerly: George Stephenson & Co.
- Industry: Minerals
- Founded: 1837
- Founders: George Stephenson
- Defunct: 1998
- Fate: Acquired and closed by rival Stanton
- Successor: Biwater Industries
- Headquarters: Clay Cross near Chesterfield, Great Britain
- Products: Coal, iron, limestone, bricks, minerals, gas and water pipes

The Clay Cross Company was founded as George Stephenson and Co. in 1837 by the railway pioneer, George Stephenson. The company established coal mines, ironworks, brickworks and pipe factories at Clay Cross near Chesterfield. The company was closed in 1998.

== George and Robert Stephenson 1837–1852 ==
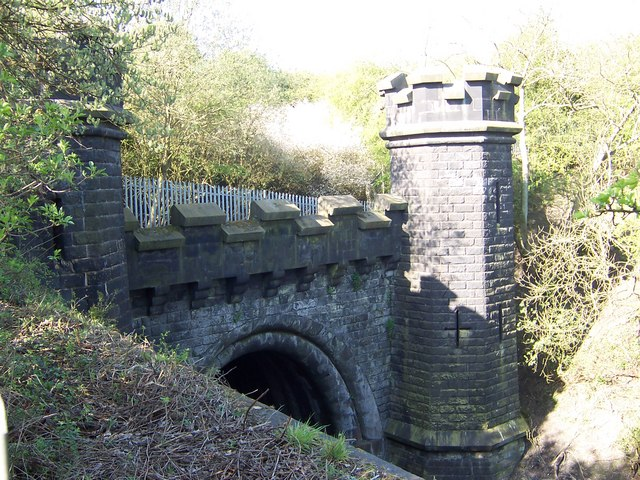
Clay Cross Tunnel

In 1837 George Stephenson discovered both coal and iron reserves while digging a tunnel through Clay Cross Hill, for the North Midland Railway's line between Derby and Leeds. Stephenson moved into Tapton House, near Chesterfield, and in 1837 he established George Stephenson and Company. The Clay Cross Tunnel is just over a mile long and was completed in 1839. Clay Cross Coal and Iron Works were started by George and his son Robert Stephenson, with backing from Lord Wolverton, George Hudson, Sir Joshua Walmsley, Sir Morton Peto, Sir William Jackson and others. The company built a colliery and coke ovens at Clay Cross, which were opened in 1840.

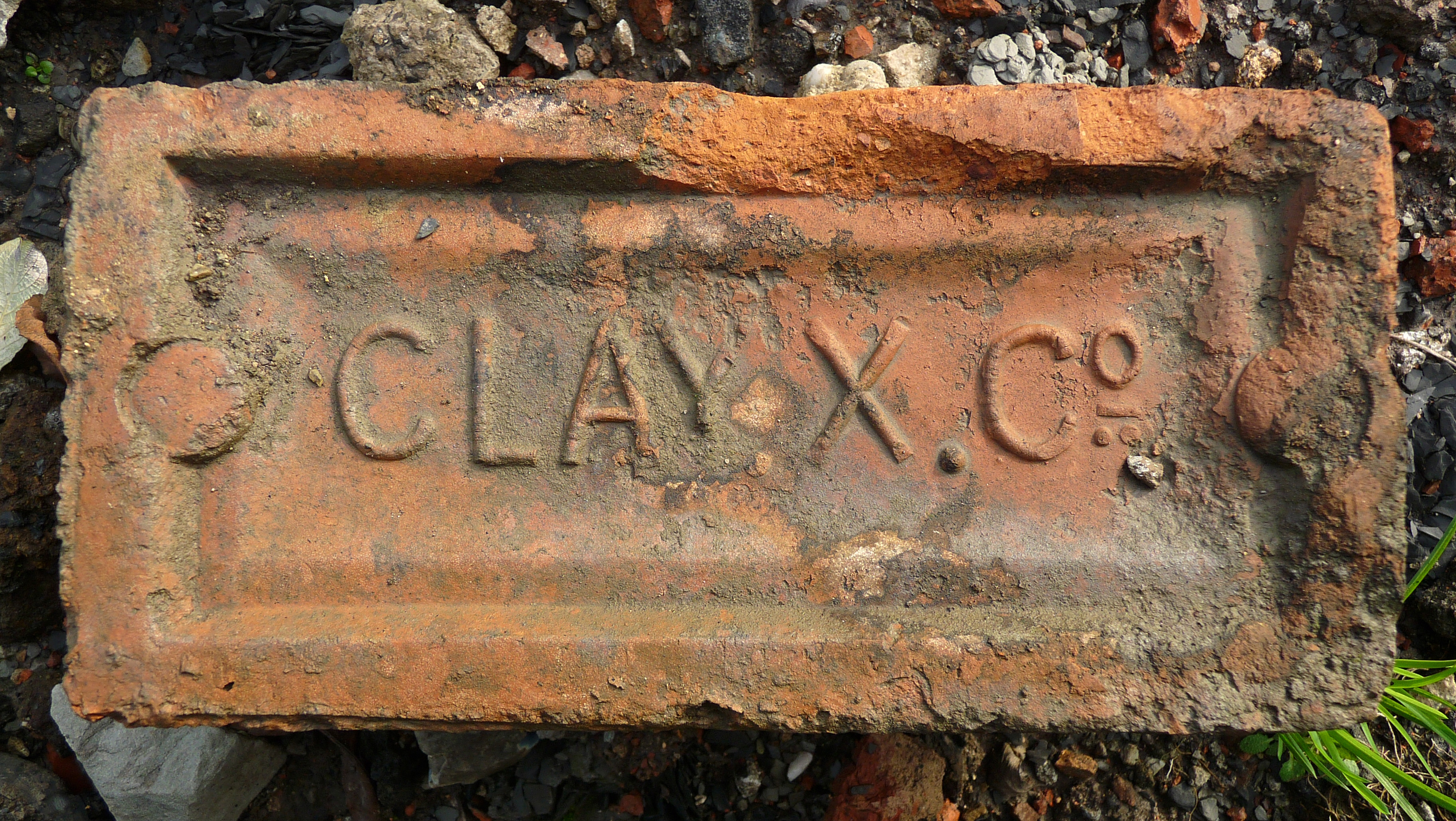
Brick from the Clay Cross Company's brickworks

At the time Clay Cross was a small village, but production of coal and minerals created a surge in the population. Nearly 400 houses were built for the workers (tunnel navvies initially and then miners) and their families, and by 1846 the population around Clay Cross approached 1500. The company made their own bricks for the houses and industrial buildings. The initial brickworks was at the factory site but a new brickworks with large kilns near the railway station could produce five million bricks per year. By 1850 there were three chapels, a church and a new school.

After George Stephenson died in 1848, Robert (now a Member of Parliament) took charge of the company. The company's four coal pits were struggling to remain profitable following a drop in the price of coal. Robert had a dispute with the other large shareholders about a contract with London and North Western Railway (LNWR) to supply coal to London (one tenth of all the coal reaching London was from Clay Cross). Robert sold his shares in the company in 1852, from when it became the Clay Cross Company.

== Jackson family 1852–1966 ==
Sir William Jackson was now the owner of Clay Cross Company and in 1866 he appointed his son John Jackson (1843–1899) to run the Clay Cross Coal and Iron Works. By 1871 Sir William had bought out all of the company's interests and he became the sole proprietor. The Clay Cross Economiser Company was set up to manufacture fuel economisers, which used the waste heat from steam boilers to improve their efficiency. Sir William turned the Clay Cross Company into a limited company in 1913, consisting of seven collieries (producing "CXC Gold Medal" coal), a brickworks, a gas plant, a limestone quarry, three blast furnaces and an iron foundry. The 280 beehive coke ovens for the iron works had been replaced in 1903 by 50 simplex by-product coke ovens.

In 1919 the Clay Cross Company acquired the Overton Estate in Ashover, which had valuable mineral deposits. The company built the narrow gauge Ashover Light Railway to transport the minerals 7 miles to Clay Cross. The railway opened in 1924 but closed in 1950, with the closure of quarries and transport by road being cheaper to operate.

The National Coal Board (NCB) was set up 1946 to nationalise Britain's coal industry. The NCB took over control of the company's collieries and gas works. The company was now owned and run by the brothers Colonel Humphrey Jackson and Captain Guy Jackson. In 1951 they bought a gravel company at Croxden in Staffordshire. The blast furnaces were demolished in 1959 and replaced by two hot-blast cupolas for expanding the company's production of ductile iron pipes.

== Public ownership 1966–1998 ==
In 1966 the company became a public limited company, following Captain Guy Jackson's death. Stephen de Bartolomé became chairman after Colonel Humphrey Jackson died in 1969.

In 1974, the Clay Cross Company was acquired by RMC Group (Ready Mixed Concrete) which had a primary interest in its quarries. Vice Chairman John Jackson retired from the company's board, ending 120 years of the family's stewardship.

In 1984 the Biwater Group purchased the Clay Cross Company, which continued to manufacture iron pipes for export within Europe. With over 700 employees, It remained the main employer in Clay Cross until 1998, when Biwater Industries was bought by rival pipe manufacturer Saint-Gobain (through its UK subsidiary Stanton plc). Controversially Saint-Gobain closed the site within six months to prevent competition with its own factories. The site of the Clay Cross Company's pipe factory has since been turned into a business park of industrial units.

== Bibliography ==
- Chapman, Stanley (1987) The Clay Cross Company 1837 - 1987 ISBN 0-9512183-0-1
