= Neasden Power Station =

Coal-fired power station in the UK

- Country: England
- Location: Greater London
- Coordinates: 51.5597°N 0.2613°W
- Commission date: 1904
- Decommission date: 1968
- Operators: Metropolitan Railway; London Transport (from 1933)

Thermal power station
- Primary fuel: Coal

Power generation
- Nameplate capacity: 20.5 MW

Neasden Power Station was a coal-fired power station built by the Metropolitan Railway for its electrification project. It was opened in December 1904. It was within the site of the current London Underground Neasden Depot.

The station was commissioned in 1904 initially with two British Westinghouse turbo-generators rated at 3,500 kW 11,000 Volts 33 1/3 Hertz each and a further two were added shortly after. These were powered by 10 x Babcock & Wilcox boilers evaporating 20,000 Ib/hr. Two 5,000 kW sets were added five years later. The station was further upgraded in 1912 when the original turbines were replaced.

Along with Lots Road Power Station and Greenwich power station, Neasden power station supplied the whole London Passenger Transport Board network from its formation in 1933.

Coal for the power station was brought in by trains, initially by the Metropolitan Railway using its fleet of steam locomotives, from June 1935 by the London & North Eastern Railway, and from 1948 British Rail.

By 1957 the plant comprised eleven boilers, five were chain grate stokers and six were heavy fuel oil. The total evaporative capacity was 880,000 lb/hr (111 kg/s). These supplied 3 × 20 MW, 1 × 16.5 MW and 1 × 13.2 MW generating sets, a total capacity of 89.7 MW. Electricity was generated at 11 kV, 33.33 Hz.

Condenser cooling was undertaken in nine wooden cooling towers, their cooling capacity was 2.627 million gallons per hour (0.33 m^{3}/s).

The power station ceased generating in 1968.
