= British Westinghouse Electric and Manufacturing Co Ltd v Underground Electric Rlys Co of London Ltd =

British Westinghouse Ltd v Underground Ltd
- Court: House of Lords
- Full case name: British Westinghouse Electric and Manufacturing Company, Limited v Underground Electric Railways Company of London, Limited
- Decided: July 19, 1912
- Citation: [1912] AC 673, [1911-13] All ER Rep 63, 81 LJKB 1132, 107 LT 325
- Transcript: Judgment

Court membership
- Judges sitting: Viscount Haldane LC, Lord Ashbourne, Lord Macnaghten, and Lord Atkinson

Case opinions
- Viscount Haldane LC

Keywords
- Remedies, Duty to mitigate

British Westinghouse Electric and Manufacturing Co Ltd v Underground Electric Railways Co of London Ltd [1912] AC 673 is an English contract law case, concerning the duty to mitigate one's loss after a breach of contract.

== Facts ==
The defendants, British Westinghouse Electric and Manufacturing Co Ltd, supplied the plaintiffs, the London Underground, with turbines (and alternators) which, in breach of contract, were deficient in power. The plaintiffs accepted and used the turbines but reserved their right to claim damages. Later they replaced the turbines with others which were far more efficient than those supplied by the defendants would have been, even if they had complied with the contract. The plaintiffs claimed to recover the cost of the substitute turbines as damages.

== Judgment ==
The House of Lords held that in assessing the damages for the breach any loss sustained by the plaintiffs had to be balanced against any gain to them arising directly out of the steps they had taken to lessen the consequences of the breach.

Although the plaintiffs had not been bound to buy the new machines, having done so, the consequential gain in profits and saved expenses had to be brought into account. The savings exceeded the cost of the machines and so the plaintiffs recovered nothing under this head.

Giving the leading judgment, Viscount Haldane LC, 688–9, ‘the quantum of damage is a question of fact’. He set out the principles for determining the measure of damages.

The first is that, as far as possible, he who has proved a breach of a bargain to supply what he contracted to get is to be placed, as far as money can do it, in as good a situation as if the contract had been performed. The fundamental basis is thus compensation for pecuniary loss naturally flowing from the breach; but this first principle is qualified by a second, which imposes on a plaintiff the duty of taking all reasonable steps to mitigate the loss consequent on the breach, and debars him from claiming in respect of any part of the damage which is due to his neglect to take such steps.

The duty to mitigate does not include a duty to take ‘any step which a reasonable and prudent man would not ordinarily take in the course of his business.’

== See also ==
- English contract law
