= Milltown, Derbyshire =

Coordinates: 53.151°N 1.471°W

Milltown
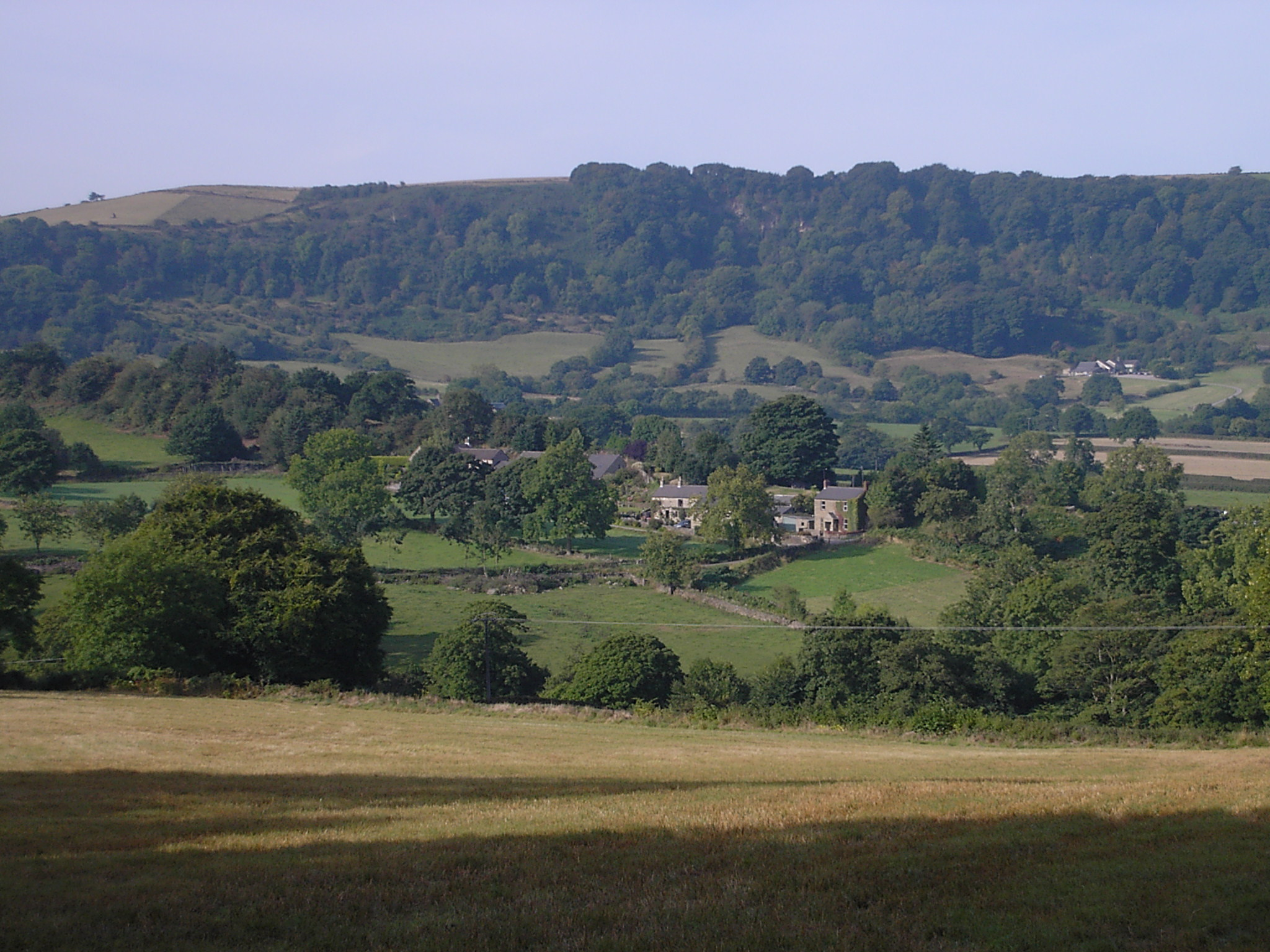
- Milltown and Ravennest Tor

- Location within Derbyshire
- OS grid reference: SK354616
- District: North East Derbyshire
- Shire county: Derbyshire
- Region: East Midlands
- Country: England
- Sovereign state: United Kingdom
- Post town: CHESTERFIELD
- Postcode district: S45
- Police: Derbyshire
- Fire: Derbyshire
- Ambulance: East Midlands

Milltown is a village in Derbyshire, England. It is located 1 mile south-east of Ashover and is part of Ashover civil parish. To the north of the village is Milltown Quarry, now closed. It is a small quarry, which was open for limestone extraction. Milltown once had a station on the Ashover Light Railway, which closed in 1936.

The listed Milltown Methodist Church is located in the village.
