= Ashover =

Coordinates: 53.163°N 1.477°W

- Village and civil parish
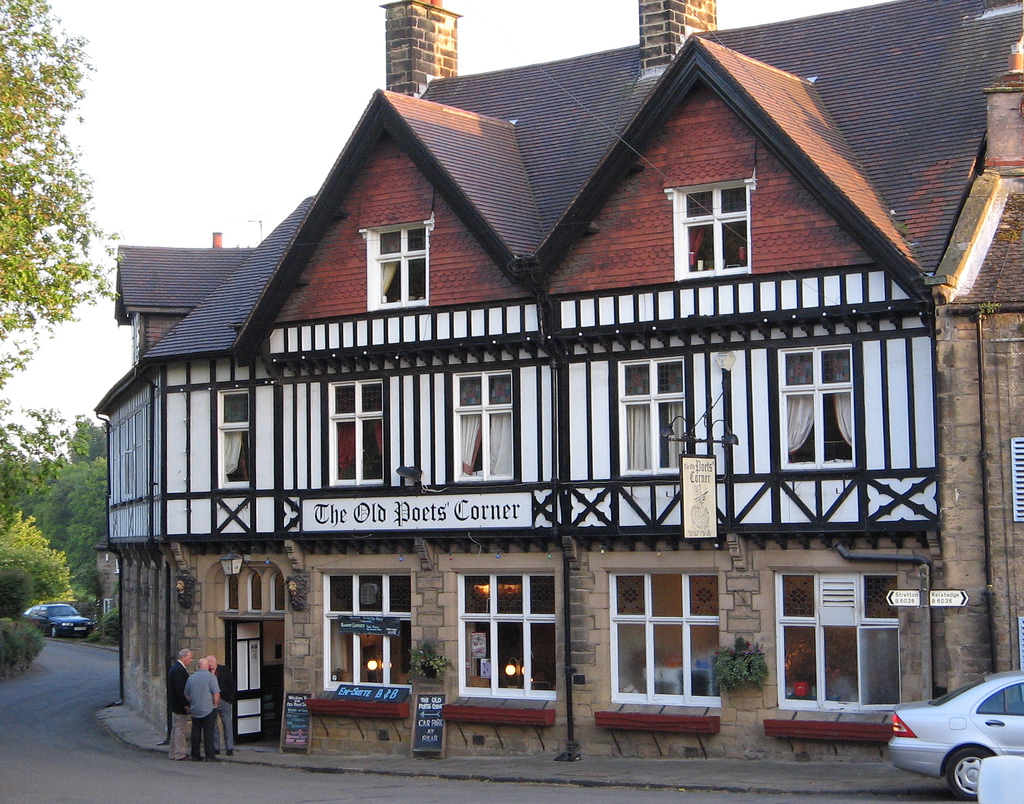
- The Old Poets' Corner

- Location within Derbyshire
- Interactive map of Ashover
- Area: 14.93 sq mi (38.7 km^{2})
- Population: 1,959 (2021)
  - Density: 131/sq mi (51/km^{2})
- OS grid reference: SK 349630
  - London: 125 mi (201 km) SE
- Civil parish: Ashover
- District: North East Derbyshire
- Shire county: Derbyshire
- Region: East Midlands
- Country: England
- Sovereign state: United Kingdom
- Settlements: Alicehead, Alton, Ashover Hay, Doehole, Failgate, Farhill, Gladwin's Mark, Kelstedge, Littlemoor, Milltown, Slack, Spitewinter, Stone Edge and Uppertown
- Post town: Chesterfield
- Postcode district: S45
- Dialling code: 01246
- Police: Derbyshire
- Fire: Derbyshire
- Ambulance: East Midlands
- UK Parliament: North East Derbyshire
- Website: www.ashover-pc.gov.uk

Ashover is a village and civil parish in the English county of Derbyshire. It is in the North East Derbyshire district of the county. The population of the civil parish taken at the 2011 census was 1,905, increasing to 1,959 for the 2021 census. It sits in a valley, not far from the town of Matlock and the Peak District national park.

== Geography ==
The centre of the village is a conservation area. The River Amber flows through the village. Although Ashover is a small settlement, the actual parish boundaries of the village extend for some 15 square miles (39 km^{2}), including the nearby settlements of Alicehead, Alton, Ashover Hay, Farhill, Kelstedge, Littlemoor, Milltown, Spitewinter, Stone Edge and Uppertown. The two major roads, running through the parish, are the A632 from Matlock to Chesterfield, and the A615 from Matlock to Alfreton. The area along that part of the A615 is named Doehole. Slack is a small hamlet, within the parish, which is south west of Kelstedge on the A632; nearby to there, on Robridding Road (off Wirestone Lane), is the Eddlestow Lot Picnic Site, which has been developed in the former Wirestone Quarry: it is surrounded by heathland vegetation. The picnic site provides a good base to explore the local Public Rights of Way. Circular walks are waymarked from the car park, a leaflet is available by contacting the County Council. There is public access into many of the adjacent Forestry Commission owned woodlands. The site has plants including heather and bilberry. The other numbered roads in the parish are the B5057 from near North Brittain to Stone Edge, the B6036 between Kelstedge and Dalebank running past Ashover itself, and the B6014 from near Butterley to just past Ashover Hay. Fallgate is a hamlet beside the River Amber, in the south-east corner of the parish, off the B6036 to Woolley Moor and Handley.

== History ==
Known in Saxon times as Essovre (possibly 'beyond the ash trees' or 'ash tree slope'), Ashover was probably in existence during the first taxation survey of England by King Alfred in 893. However, the first written reference to the village occurs in the Domesday Book of 1086, in which Ashover is owned by Ralph fitzHubert and is credited with a church, a priest, several ploughs, a mill. It had previously had a taxable value of four pounds, but it was revalued at thirty shillings.

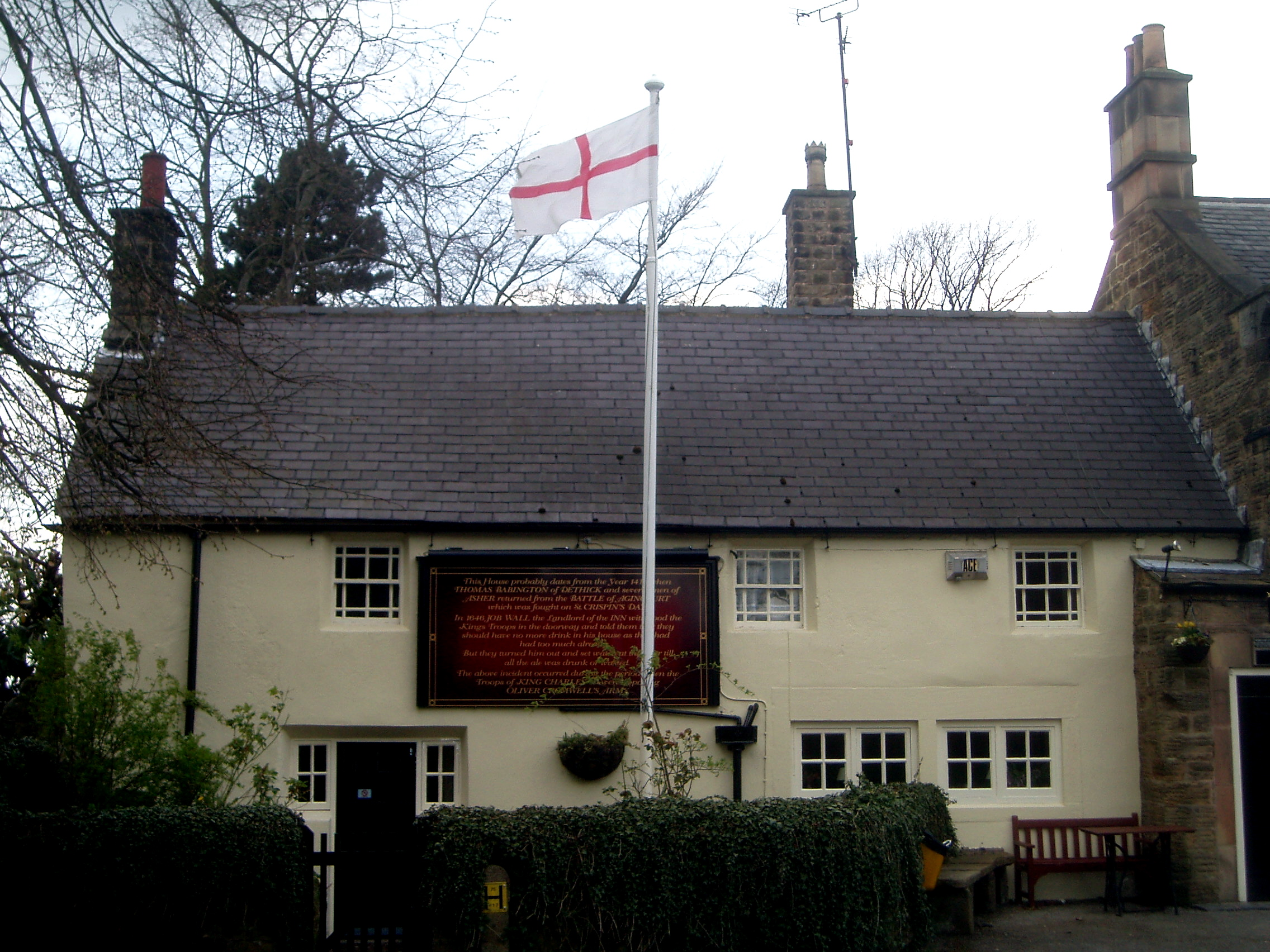
The Crispin Inn, Ashover

Ashover was the scene of a confrontation between the Royalists and the Roundheads during the English Civil War in the 17th century. The Roundheads, short of ammunition, demolished the windows of the church and used the lead to make bullets. They also reduced nearby Eastwood Hall to ruins; all that can be seen today are the ivy-clad remains. Royalists slaughtered livestock and drank all the wine and ale in the cellars of Eddlestow Hall while the owner Sir John Pershall was away. Job Wall, the landlord of the Crispin Inn public house, refused entry to the army, telling them they had had too much to drink. But they threw him out and drank the ale, pouring what was left down the street. Outside, affixed to the front wall of the pub is a signboard with a history of the inn.

Ashover's industrial history is linked with lead mining and quarrying, both of which date back to Roman times. Butt's Quarry is a large disused example, previously excavated by the Clay Cross Company for its works three miles (4.8 km) away. During the Second World War, prisoners of war held at Clay Cross were taken daily to the quarry to make concrete blocks. It is now home to a wide range of different species, including jackdaws which nest on the quarry face. Part of the village was home to the stocking frame knitting industry, which once rivalled lead mining in importance. The area is called Rattle, which is believed to be a reference to the noise made by the machinery.

Electricity came to the valley in the 1920s, but the village was not connected to the National Grid until a decade later. Some outlying settlements were not connected until after the Second World War. It was not until 1967 that gas street lights were replaced by electric lighting.

Until 1963, there was a hydro in the village, sourcing its own private water supply from a tank on a hillside. Ashover had two such institutions, which were popular in the 19th century due to the belief in 'healing water'. Subsequently, purchased by the electricity board, the building is today divided into private apartments, with further expensive new houses built in the grounds.

Ashover Golf Club (now defunct) was founded in 1905. The club disappeared in the late 1920s.

== Landmarks ==
=== The Fabrick ===
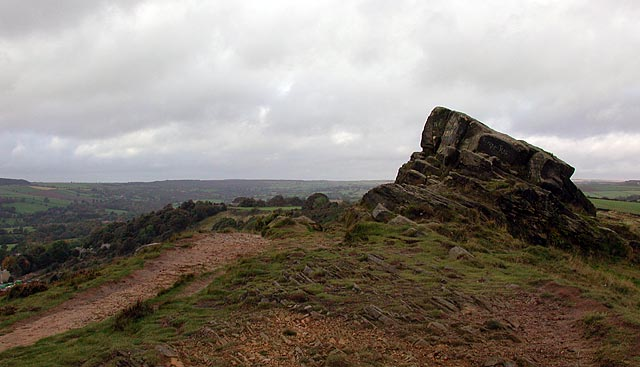
'The Fabrick' or 'Ashover Rock'

To the east of the village is a gritstone boulder and viewpoint locally known as 'The Fabrick' or 'Ashover Rock'. The Fabrick sits on an area of heathland 299 metres above sea level. It is the highest viewpoint for a considerable distance, and the majority of the landscape east of this point to the coast is lower. Consequently, on a clear day, views can be seen of nearby Chesterfield with its Crooked Spire, Bolsover Castle, Hardwick Hall, some suburbs of the South Yorkshire city of Sheffield, the surrounding counties of Nottinghamshire, Leicestershire, Staffordshire.

Next to The Fabrick is a disused Royal Observer Corps monitoring station, which was abandoned in 1991. However, it is opened up occasionally by enthusiasts. For many years, The Fabrick was privately owned by the "Bassett" sisters who were descendants of the family known for creating "Bassetts Liquorice Allsorts", but in 2006 was donated to Derbyshire County Council. In the Victorian period, there was a stone folly on the top of the Fabrick, no trace of which remains.

On certain days in the pagan calendar, morris dancers gather.

=== Gladwin's Mark ===
In present times, this is the site of Gladwin's Mark Farm and Gladwin's Mark Wood, to the far north west of the parish.

By the 18th century, there were several thousand acres of unenclosed moorland in the parish of Ashover, principally covered with heath. The only paths across this wilderness for roads were tracks in the sand or heath with here and there a stone post on the hills or elevations to serve as guides to the traveller and packhorses which traversed one point of the area to another.

Local legend was that, a man by the name of Gladwin, possibly William was crossing the moor in deep snow, late on a December afternoon. Before he had got half way night suddenly closed in and soon after a storm brought with it heavy snowfall which blinded and bewildered him enough to lose his way. Weary, tired and trembling, Gladwin stumbled on until he came to a cairn or heap of loose stones on which he sat down to rest and reflect on his situation, and realising that if he remained inactive he would be in grave danger of death from frostbite. He began with all his remaining energy to build and pile up the stones, this being summarily completed only to be pulled down and rebuilt, and repeated many times during what must have seemed to Gladwin a long and dreary night, however his life was saved by this exercise. When the welcome daylight came to his rescue, it found the pile just perfected where it still remains and bears the name of Gladwin's Mark.

What was the turnpike road from Chesterfield to Rowsley passes about one hundred yards to the right of the Mark. Two farm houses, one on each side of the road, built by Sir Joseph Banks, a local landowner of nearby Overton Hall, were both called Gladwin's Mark, later being separated. In a croft to the left, tourists would have found the pile of stones which gives the name to these local features, and was the means of saving the life of poor Gladwin.

== Popular culture and awards ==
The village is known for the Ashover Light Railway, which was owned and operated by the Clay Cross Company from 1925 to 1950. Along with Crich and Matlock, the village was used for a time as a location for the ITV drama series Peak Practice. Ashover won the Calor Village of the Year competition in 2005.

== Notable people ==
- Immanuel Bourne (1590–1672), cleric, received the living of Ashover in 1622; he exhibited strong sympathy with the Puritans.
- George Bassett (c. 1818–1886), founded Bassett's in 1842, a confectionery firm in Sheffield
- Steve Perez (born 1956), beverage industry entrepreneur and a professional rally driver

== Climate ==
Climate data for Ashover (Note: Weather station is located 5 miles (8 km) from the Chesterfield town centre.), elevation: 178 m (584 ft) (1991–2020)
Month	Jan	Feb	Mar	Apr	May	Jun	Jul	Aug	Sep	Oct	Nov	Dec	Year
Mean daily maximum °C (°F)	6.6 (43.9)	7.3 (45.1)	9.8 (49.6)	12.9 (55.2)	16.1 (61.0)	18.9 (66.0)	21.1 (70.0)	20.6 (69.1)	17.5 (63.5)	13.4 (56.1)	9.5 (49.1)	7.0 (44.6)	13.4 (56.1)
Mean daily minimum °C (°F)	1.4 (34.5)	1.4 (34.5)	2.6 (36.7)	4.2 (39.6)	6.8 (44.2)	9.7 (49.5)	11.8 (53.2)	11.7 (53.1)	9.6 (49.3)	7.0 (44.6)	3.9 (39.0)	1.8 (35.2)	6.0 (42.8)
Average rainfall mm (inches)	81.2 (3.20)	70.9 (2.79)	61.0 (2.40)	66.0 (2.60)	60.9 (2.40)	80.0 (3.15)	66.3 (2.61)	72.2 (2.84)	70.0 (2.76)	89.6 (3.53)	94.2 (3.71)	95.7 (3.77)	908.2 (35.76)
Average rainy days (≥ 1 mm)	13.2	11.7	11.0	10.3	9.9	10.2	10.0	10.0	10.1	12.7	13.8	14.2	137.1
Mean monthly sunshine hours	54.4	68.3	118.0	151.3	195.7	185.4	198.4	182.0	135.5	97.4	65.5	54.1	1,506
Source: Met Office

== See also ==
- List of places in Derbyshire
- Listed buildings in Ashover
