= Ashover Light Railway =

Narrow gauge railway in Derbyshire, England

Coordinates: 53.1440°N 1.4490°W

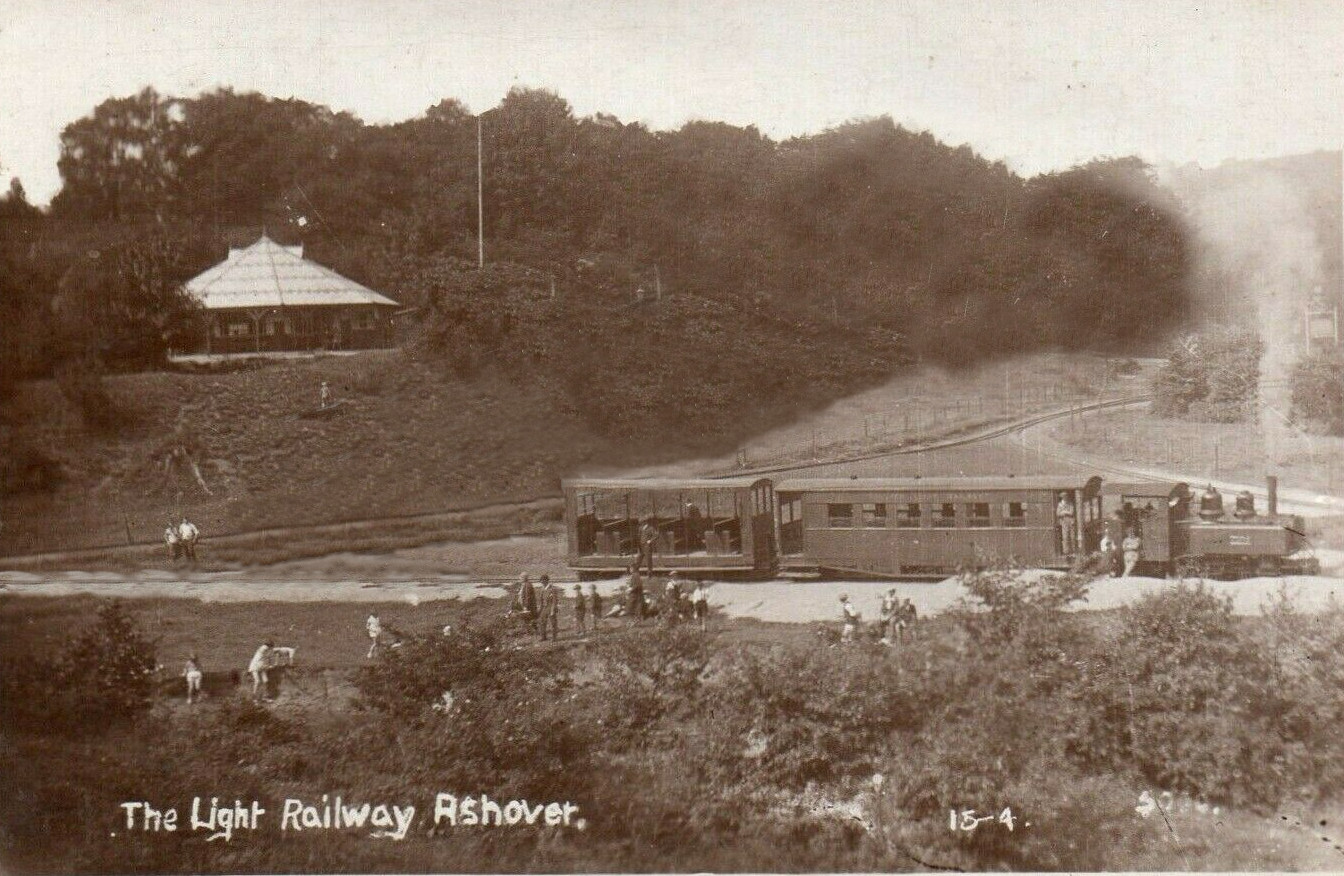
- The Light Railway Ashover, ca 1925

Overview
- Headquarters: Clay Cross
- Locale: England
- Dates of operation: 1924–1950
- Successor: abandoned

Technical
- Track gauge: 1 ft 11 1/2 in (597 mm)
- Length: 7 1/4 miles (11.7 km)

The Ashover Light Railway was a 1 ft 11 1/2 in (597 mm) narrow gauge railway in Derbyshire, England that connected Clay Cross and Ashover. It was built by the Clay Cross Company to transport minerals such as limestone, fluorite, barytes and gritstone to its works at Clay Cross and for transport around the country by the LMS.

== History ==
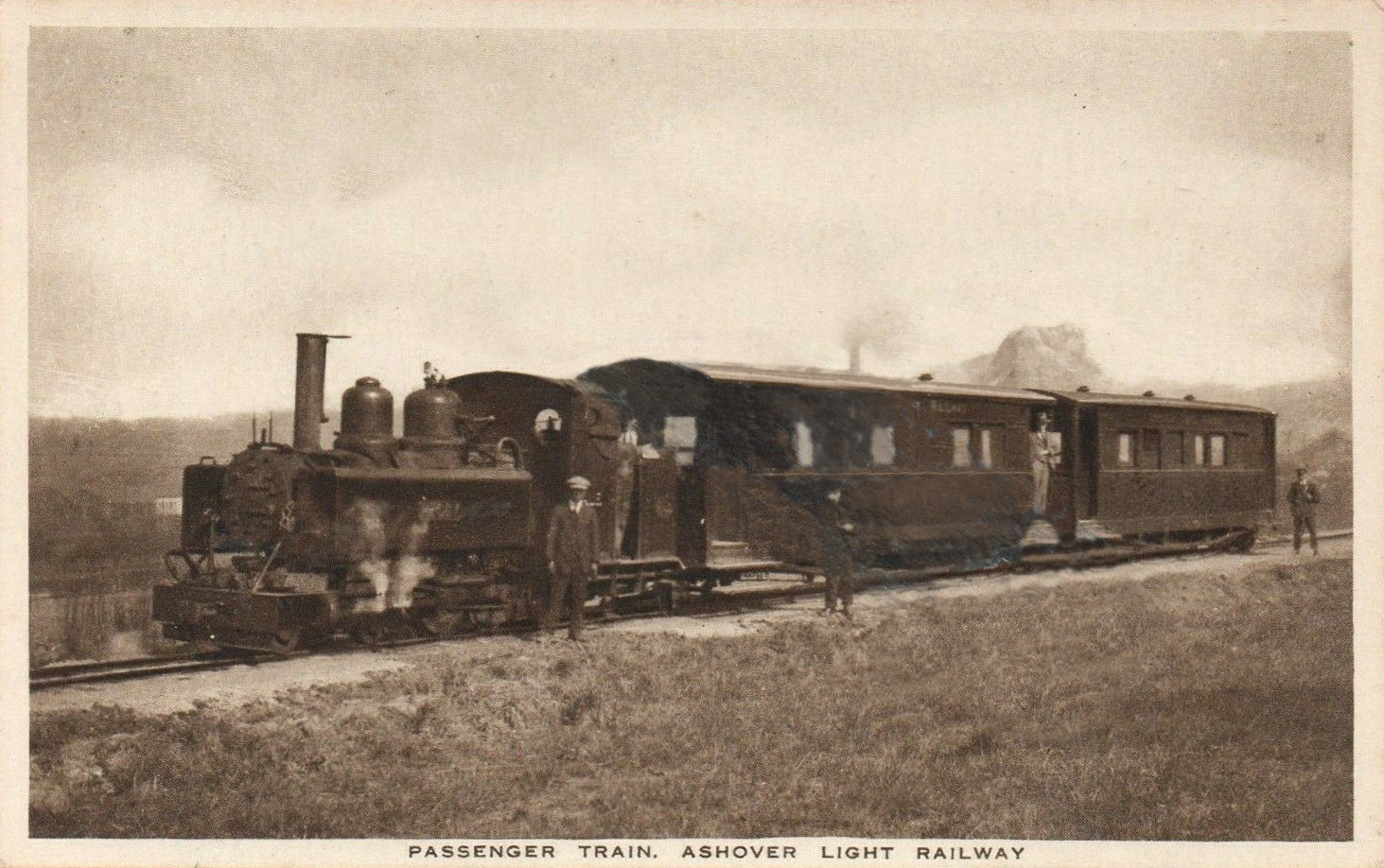
Passenger Train. Ashover Light Railway

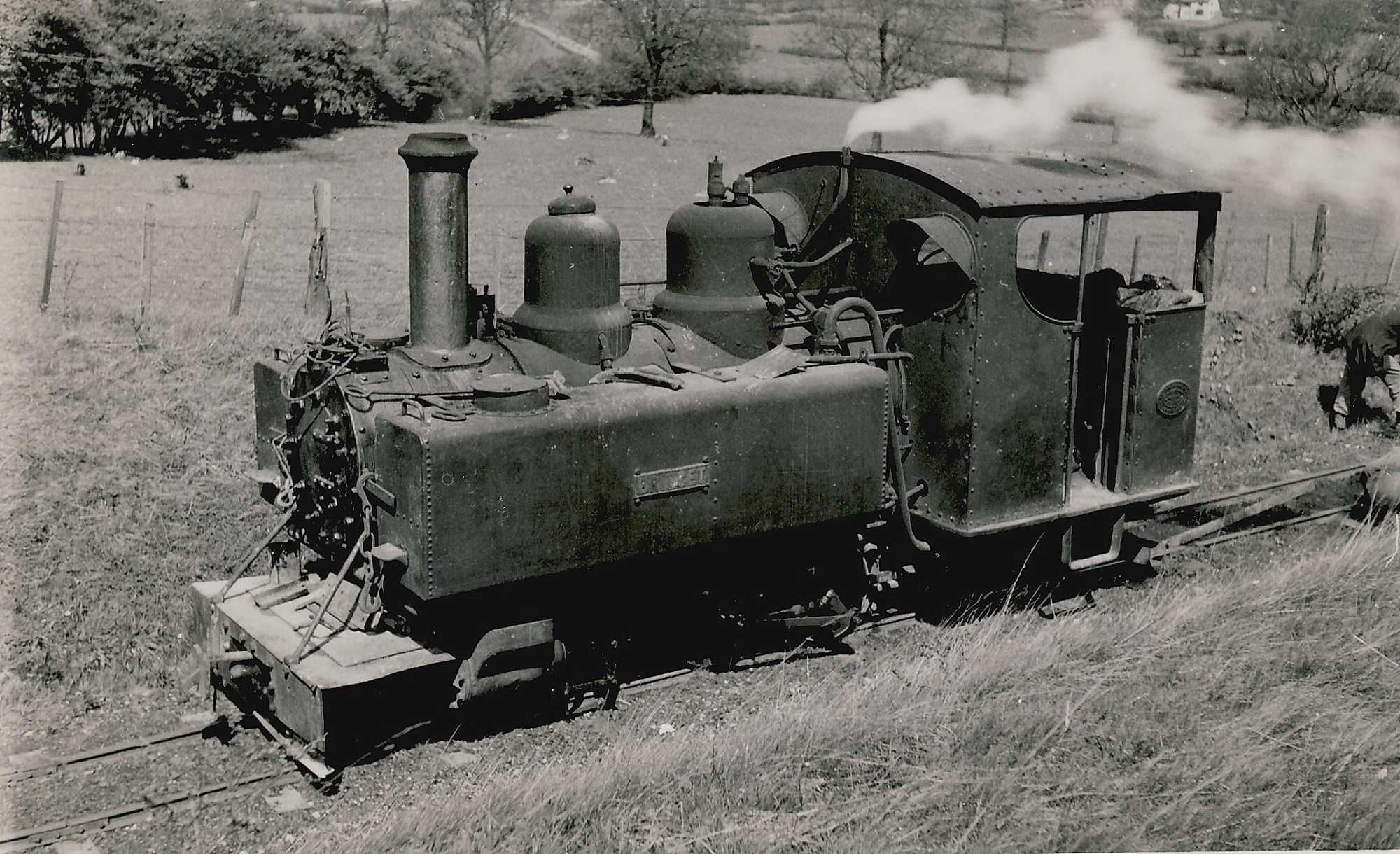
One of the Baldwin 10-12-D engines at Ashover, ca. 1948

George Stephenson surveyed the route for the North Midland Railway between Derby and Leeds in the 1830s. The route passed close to Ashover where Stephenson saw the potential for the development of a colliery. He formed George Stephenson & Company in 1837 and built a colliery and coke ovens at Clay Cross which opened in 1840. The company passed to his son Robert Stephenson on George's death in 1848, and in 1852 he sold his shares, the business becoming the Clay Cross Company, which was at one time the largest independent employer in the UK.

The company continued to develop its mining interests and in 1918 it purchased the Overton Estate at Fallgate with the aim of extracting minerals. The Ashover Light Railway Order 1919 was obtained under the Light Railways Act 1896 authorising a standard gauge railway between the Midland Railway station at Stretton and Ashover, with a 2 ft (610 mm) gauge rope-worked mineral railway serving Alton colliery. This railway was not built because the cost estimates were too high. Instead in 1920 H. F. Stephens, the consulting engineer for the line, proposed building the entire railway to 2 ft gauge. This considerably reduced the costs of construction and the plan was approved.

Construction started in 1922 and the railway opened to goods traffic in 1924. The formal opening to passenger traffic took place in March 1925. The line was built using surplus equipment from the War Department Light Railways. Although the line was built principally to carry mineral traffic, its passenger service proved successful during the mid-1920s, but competition from buses saw numbers decline and Winter services ceased in 1934.

All passenger services were withdrawn in 1936, but the four large bogie carriages built by Gloucester RC&W survived through WW2, and all ended up as stands on the Works bowling green. Nos 1 and 2 were moved to the Lincolnshire Coast Light Railway, No 4 was moved to the Golden Valley Light Railway, and the last (presumably No 3) was scrapped in 1960.

The mineral traffic continued but the railway declined through the 1940s. In 1949 the railway's last remaining contract with Butts quarry was terminated and the quarry closed in 1950. The railway closed on 31 March 1950. Most of the rail remained in place through October of that year when a last inspection trip was made. After that the majority of the railway was lifted. However a short length was left in place around the Fallgate works. This remnant track continued to be used until 1968.

Part of the route was flooded in 1958 when Ogston Reservoir was formed.

== Preservation society ==
In 1996, the Ashover Light Railway Society was formed with the aim of saving the surviving features of the railway. They carried out a track-bed survey and found that most of the track-bed between Ashover and Ogston Reservoir was largely intact. This changed the direction of the society from preserving the line's remaining artefacts, to reopening at least a short section of the line.

So far, the society has had much support from the local population and the council for the area. In 2007, they bought 'Where the Rainbow Ends' cafe, and have since dismantled it and put it into storage for future use.

They have also taken over the land that was the Derbyshire Dales Narrow Gauge Railway (based at Peak Rail in Rowsley, Derbyshire) and are developing a new layout.

== Locomotives ==
Name	Builder	Wheels	Works Number	WD Number	Built	Notes
Guy (I)	Baldwin	4-6-0PT		525	1916	In ALR use from 1923. Out of use 1925. Worn out after constructing the line. Used as an occasional source of spare parts for the other engines. Remains scrapped 1939. Nameplates reused on Guy (II).
Peggy	Baldwin	4-6-0PT	44743	838	1917	In ALR use from 1923. Out of use 1949. Scrapped 1951.
Hummy	Baldwin	4-6-0PT	44370	645	1916	In ALR use from 1923. Out of use 1946. Scrapped 1951.
Joan	Baldwin	4-6-0PT	44720	815	1917	In ALR use from 1923. Out of use 1948. Scrapped 1951.
Bridget	Baldwin	4-6-0PT	44737	832	1917	In ALR use from 1926. Out of use 1945. Scrapped 1951.
Guy (II)	Baldwin	4-6-0PT	44695	790	1917	In ALR use from 1926. Out of use 1936. Scrapped 1943.
Muir Hill 106	Muir Hill	4wPM	106		1925	Although known for its hand-made appearance, 106 was manufactured by Muir Hill of Trafford Park, Manchester. It used the engine of a Fordson tractor which was chain driven externally to the wheelsets.
Amos	Dick Kerr	4wPE				Rebuilt by the ALR in 1927. In 1947 Amos was converted to standard gauge and used at Bloxham Ironstone pits. Scrapped 1964.
McLaren	British Westinghouse	4wDE				Rebuilt by the ALR in 1927. During the rebuild, it was decided to replace the Petrol engine with a 3 cylinder Diesel engine (produced by J & H McLaren Ltd of Leeds), in an attempt to improve efficiency.
Planet	Hibberd	4wDM	3307		1948	Built new for the ALR as a stop-gap prior to line closure. Now running on the Ffestiniog Railway, named Ashover. Fitted with a new cab at the Ffestiniog Railway, in order to improve visibility while shunting.
RR82	Ransomes & Rapier	4wDM	82			Some parts used to restore similar RR80, now at the Amberley Museum Railway.
	Ruston & Hornsby	4wDH	437367		1959	Purchased by the Clay Cross Co in 1963. Used for shunting at Fallgate until 1968. Sold to Bressingham Hall in 1971 and then onto the Bromyard and Linton Light Railway in 1980.

== The route ==
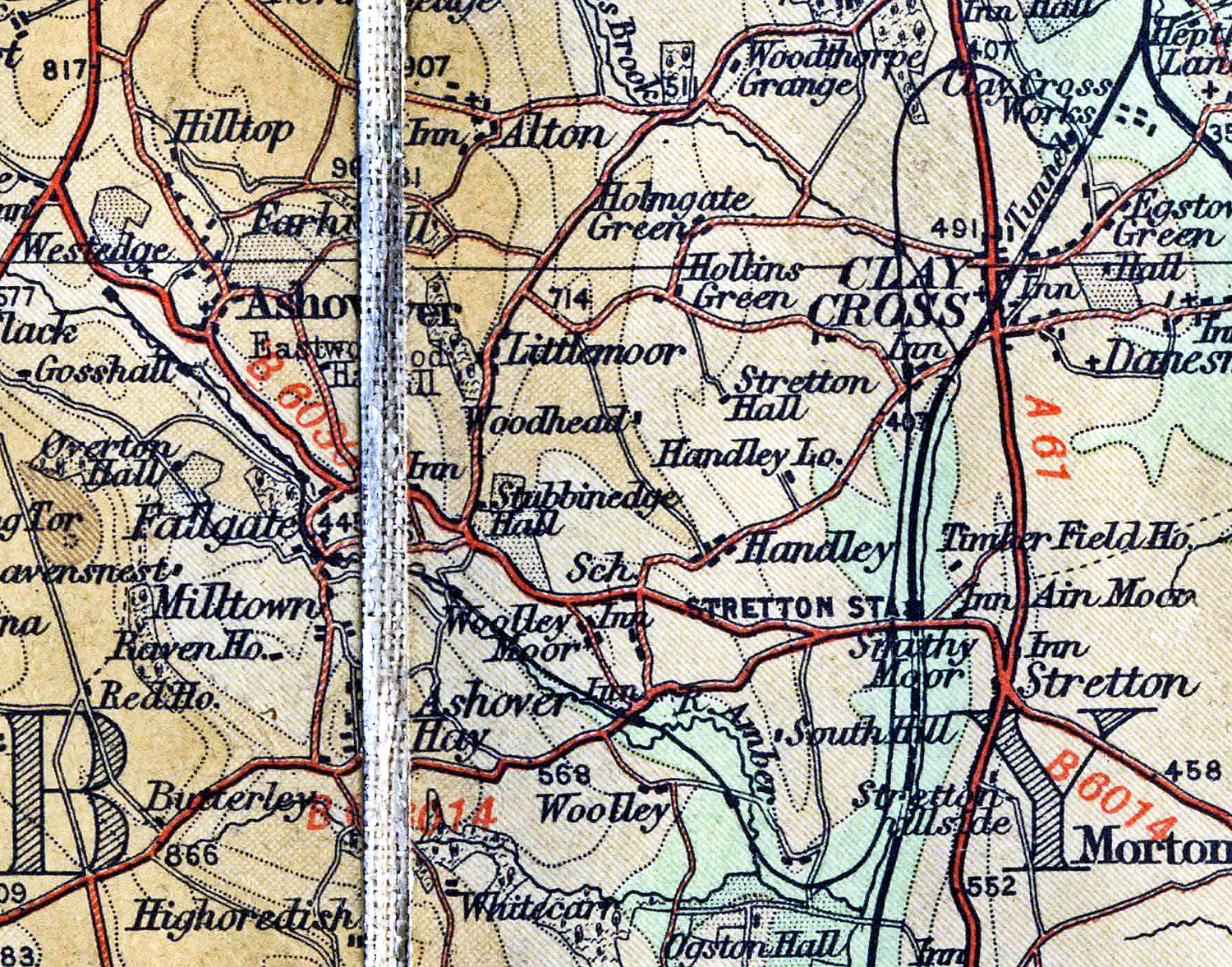
1938 map showing the route of the railway from Clay Cross Works (top right) south and then northwest to Ashover. Station locations are marked but not named.

The line started at Clay Cross Works, just above the northern portal of the Clay Cross Tunnel. From here, the line swung northwards out of the town, then curved westwards through 180-degree to avoid going through Clay Cross town centre. The problem with this route was the Chesterfield Road, now the A61, and crossing it required a steel girder bridge spanning 45 ft (14 m). The height had to be 16 ft (4.9 m) above road level, which required a .5 mi (0.80 km) long approach embankment to be built. The bridge and embankment were the only major pieces of engineering on the entire route between Clay Cross and Ashover. The bridge support on the west side of the road can still be seen today. Shortly after the opening of the railway, the Pirelli Tyre Company at Burton-upon-Trent had a large advertisement painted on the bridge therefore it became known as 'The Pirelli Bridge'.

Several stations were provided along the line, with the main terminus and headquarters being Clay Cross & Egstow within the Clay Cross Works. Four further stations named Chesterfield Road, Holmgate, Springfield and Clay Lane were erected within the town boundaries of Clay Cross, with the next station being at Stretton. At this point the line was still continuing southwards, but soon swung north-westwards again to follow the picturesque course of the River Amber as far as Ashover. Stations along this section were Hurst Lane, Woolley, Dalebank, Milltown, Fallgate, Salter Lane (for Ashover), and Ashover Butts.

== Stations and halts ==
Clay Cross and Egstow An open-fronted wooden shelter with the manager's office on one side, and a room which was intended a parcels office, but was actually used as a general storeroom on the other. The station was the only one on the line that had electric lighting. It had had an unusually large 10 by 3 ft (3.05 by 0.91 m) nameboard which stood on the single low platform.

Chesterfield Road was situated just before the large bridge over the Chesterfield to Derby road. It had a small wooden shelter, and was accessed by a flight of steps down to the road. It was one of the busier stations on the line because buses passed at half-hourly intervals. In 1940, the wooden shelter was destroyed in a gale, and the pieces were used to construct a small store-shed at the back of the Clay Cross locomotive shed.

Holmgate Halt had a siding capable of holding around six wagons. It was provided with a small wooden shelter and a telephone box.

Springfield Halt consisted of nothing more than a nameboard at a point where the line was crossed by a footpath.

Clay Lane Halt had a wooden shelter and a telephone box. It was located about a quarter of a mile from the main street in Clay Cross, near the Royal Oak public house. The points were laid for a siding, but this was never built, due to meagre goods traffic. Despite this, passenger traffic was initially good.

Stretton provided the interchange with the London, Midland and Scottish Railway. It had a wooden shelter, with a goods office and a telephone box. The loop line at Stretton was used as accommodation for connecting trains. The timetables with the main line did not always coincide, and ALR trains sometimes had to wait for nearly half an hour. The loop line was removed in the 1940s.

Hurst Lane Halt had a wooden shelter and telephone box, together with a water tank on wooden trestles. There were points for a siding near the shelter, but this was never laid. The water tank was gone by the late 1940s.

Woolley served the village of Woolley Moor. The station had a wooden platform and a telephone box, a platelayers' cabin and a coal office. There was a siding which could hold around five wagons. The coal office was closed in the mid 1930s. Some time before its closure, the telephone was moved from the box into the office, as coal sales were initially good, but soon deteriorated. The section of track where the station once stood has now been flooded by the Ogston Reservoir.

Dale Bank Halt consisted of a small wooden shelter. The halt was always very underused, despite being just half a mile from Stubben Edge Hall.

Milltown Halt served the village of Milltown. It had a wooden shelter, and was reached by a short roadway from Oakstedge Lane. There were points installed for a siding, but this was never laid.

Fallgate served the hamlet of Fallgate. It had a wooden shelter, a telephone box and a water tank. The station stood at the north end of a 100-yard loop adjacent to a level crossing. There was also a coal sales depot, and in 1927, a limestone dust grinding plant was built. However, due to repeated complaints by local residents, the plant was dismantled and moved to the Clay Cross Works. A tarmacadam plant was also built, operating from 1936 to 1948.

Salter Lane for Ashover was just half a mile from Overton Hall. It consisted of a low platform with a wooden shelter and a nameboard. The shelter is no longer present, but the edge of the platform is still visible.

Ashover Butts – see Ashover Butts railway station

== See also ==
- Baldwin Class 10-12-D
- British narrow-gauge railways
