= Ken Livingstone =

English politician (born 1945)

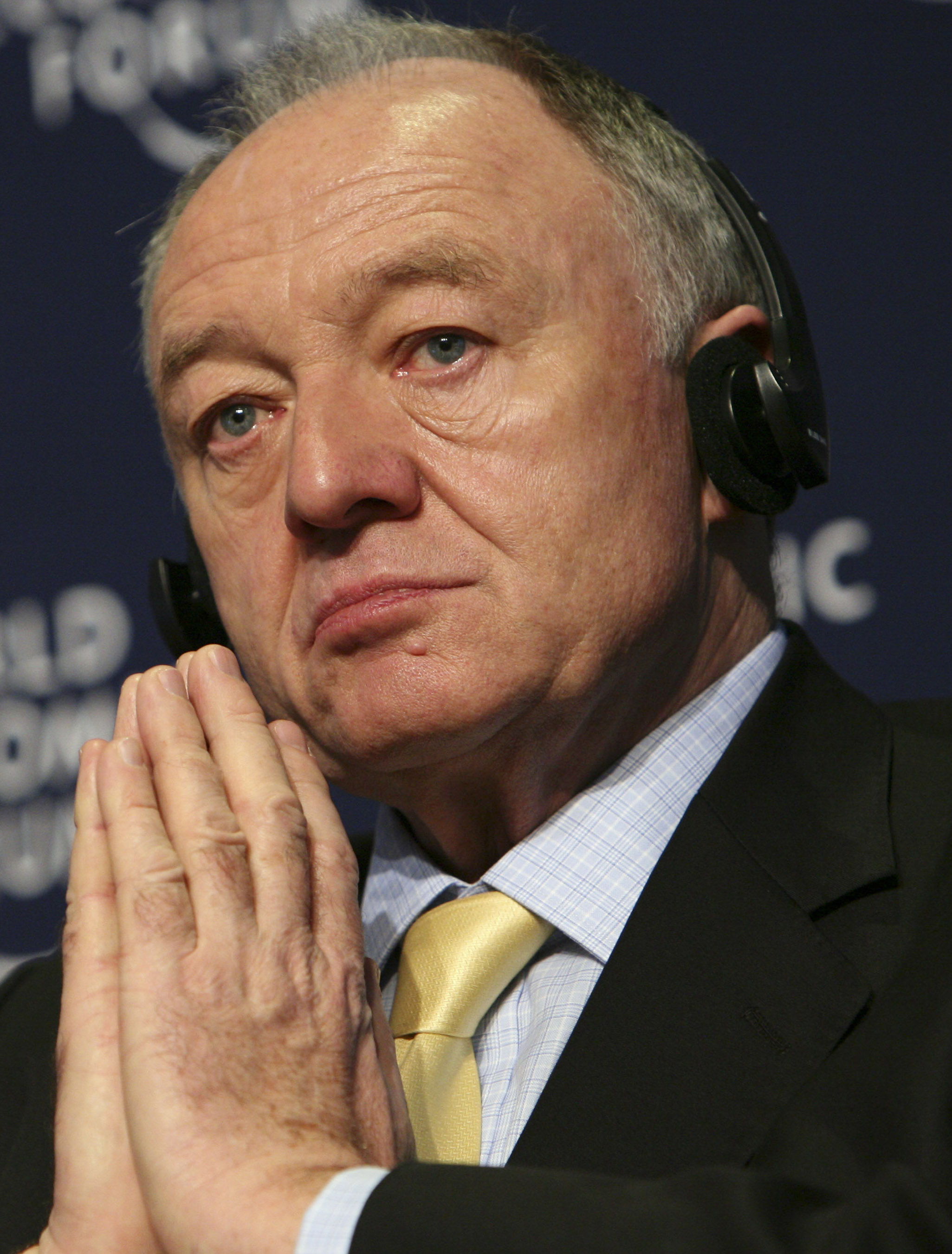
- Livingstone at the World Economic Forum in 2008

Mayor of London
- In office 4 May 2000 – 3 May 2008
- Deputy: Nicky Gavron; Jenny Jones; Nicky Gavron
- Preceded by: Office established
- Succeeded by: Boris Johnson

Leader of the Greater London Council
- In office 17 May 1981 – 31 March 1986
- Deputy: Illtyd Harrington; John McDonnell; Michael Ward
- Preceded by: Horace Cutler
- Succeeded by: Office abolished

Member of Parliament for Brent East
- In office 11 June 1987 – 14 May 2001
- Preceded by: Reg Freeson
- Succeeded by: Paul Daisley

Councillor for the Greater London Council
- In office 12 April 1973 – 31 March 1986
- Divisions: Norwood (1973–1977); Hackney North and Stoke Newington (1977–1981); Paddington (1981–1986)
- Succeeded by: Position abolished

Councillor for the Lambeth London Borough Council
- In office 13 May 1971 – 4 May 1978
- Ward: Knight's Hill

Personal details
- Born: Kenneth Robert Livingstone; 17 June 1945 (age 81) Lambeth, London, England
- Party: Independent (2000–2003; 2018–present)
- Other political affiliations: Labour (1968–2000; 2003–2018)
- Spouses: Christine Chapman (m. 1973; div. 1982) Emma Beal (m. 2009)
- Children: 5
- Education: Philippa Fawcett Teacher Training College

Kenneth Robert Livingstone (Note: /ˈlɪvɪŋstən/) (born 17 June 1945) is an English politician who served as the Leader of the Greater London Council (GLC) from 1981 until the council was abolished in 1986, and as the first mayor of London from the creation of the office in 2000 until 2008. He also served as the Member of Parliament (MP) for Brent East from 1987 to 2001. He is a former member of the Labour Party, ideologically identifying as a socialist.

Born in Lambeth, South London, to a working-class family, Livingstone joined Labour in 1968 and was elected to represent Norwood on the GLC in 1973, Hackney North and Stoke Newington in 1977, and Paddington in 1981. In the latter year, Labour representatives on the GLC elected him as the council's leader. Attempting to reduce London Underground fares, his plans were challenged in court and declared unlawful; more successful were his schemes to benefit women and several minority groups, despite stiff opposition. The mainstream press gave him the moniker "Red Ken" in reference to his socialist beliefs and criticised him for supporting republicanism, LGBT rights, and a United Ireland. Livingstone was a vocal opponent of the Conservative Party government of Prime Minister Margaret Thatcher, which in 1986 abolished the GLC. Elected as MP for Brent East in 1987, he became closely associated with anti-racist campaigns. He attempted to stand for the position of Labour Party leader following Neil Kinnock's resignation in 1992, but failed to get enough nominations. Livingstone then became a vocal critic of Tony Blair's New Labour project that pushed the party to the political centre and won the 1997 general election.

After failing to become Labour's candidate in the 2000 London mayoral election, Livingstone successfully contested the election as an independent candidate. In his first term as Mayor of London, he introduced the congestion charge, Oyster card, and articulated buses, and unsuccessfully opposed the privatisation of the London Underground's infrastructure. Despite his opposition to Blair's government on issues like the Iraq War, Livingstone was invited to stand for re-election as Labour's candidate. Re-elected in 2004, he expanded his transport policies, introduced new environmental regulations, and enacted civil rights reforms. Overseeing London's winning bid to host the 2012 Summer Olympics and ushering in a major redevelopment of the city's East End, his leadership after the 7 July 2005 London bombings was widely praised. After losing both the 2008 and 2012 London mayoral elections to the Conservative candidate Boris Johnson, Livingstone became a key ally of Labour leader Jeremy Corbyn in 2015. A longstanding critic of Israeli policy regarding Palestinians, his comments about the relationship between Adolf Hitler and Zionism resulted in his 2016 suspension and 2018 resignation from Labour.

One of the most prominent left-wing British politicians of modern times, Livingstone was a controversial and polarising figure. Supporters praised his efforts to improve rights for women, LGBT people, and ethnic minorities in London, but critics emphasised allegations of cronyism and antisemitism, as well as his connections to Irish republicans and Islamist extremists.

== Early life ==
=== Childhood and young adulthood: 1945–1967 ===
Kenneth Robert Livingstone was born at 21 Shrubbery Road in Streatham, South London, on 17 June 1945. His family was working class; his mother, Ethel Ada (née Kennard, 1915–1997), had been born in Southwark before training as an acrobatic dancer and working on the music hall circuit prior to the Second World War. Ken's Scottish father, Robert "Bob" Moffat Livingstone (1915–1971), had been born in Dunoon before joining the Merchant Navy in 1932 and becoming a ship's master. Robert and Ethel went through various jobs in the post-war years; the former worked on fishing trawlers and English Channel ferries, while the latter worked in a bakers, at Freemans catalogue dispatch and as a cinema usherette. They lived in a Tulse Hill council house before buying 66 Wolfington Road, West Norwood.

Livingstone attended St. Leonard's Primary School after which, having failed his 11-plus exam, he began secondary education at Tulse Hill Comprehensive School in 1956. There he gained four O-levels in English Literature, English Language, Geography and Art. Shy at school, he was bullied and got into trouble for truancy; he began keeping amphibians and reptiles as pets. While Livingstone's parents were Conservative Party supporters, his interest in politics was sparked by class discussions about current events encouraged by a school form master, Philip Hobsbaum, as well as the 1958 Papal election of Pope John XXIII and the 1960 United States presidential election.

From 1962 to 1970, Livingstone worked as a technician at the Chester Beatty cancer research laboratory in Fulham, looking after animals used in experimentation. There, Livingstone helped found a branch of the Association of Scientific, Technical and Managerial Staffs to fight redundancies. With a work friend, Livingstone toured West Africa in 1966, visiting Algeria, Niger, Nigeria, Lagos, Ghana and Togo. Having had his leftist views solidified by the 1964 election of Labour Prime Minister Harold Wilson, Livingstone also took part in protest marches against the Vietnam War and briefly subscribed to the publication of a libertarian socialist group, Solidarity.

=== Political activism: 1968–1970 ===
Livingstone joined the Labour Party in March 1968, when he was 23 years old. The party had suffered at recent local elections, for instance losing control of 15 London boroughs, and many leftist members were leaving the party due to the Labour government's support for the U.S. in the Vietnam War, cuts to the National Health Service budget, and restrictions on trade unions. Contrastingly, Livingstone believed that grassroots leftist campaigns – such as the 1968 student protests – were ineffective and that Labour remained the best chance for implementing reforms. Within a month of joining his local Labour branch in Norwood, Livingstone became chair and secretary of the Norwood Young Socialists, had received a seat on the constituency's General Management and Executive Committees, and joined the Local Government Committee preparing Labour's manifesto for the next borough election.

"My arrival [at the Norwood Labour Party meetings] had been rather like taking a bottle of gin into a room full of alcoholics. I was immediately passed round and consumed."

— Ken Livingstone (1987)

He also attended night school, gaining O-levels in Human Anatomy, Physiology and Hygiene, and an A-level in Zoology. Leaving his job at Chester Beatty, in September 1970 he began a 3-year course at the Philippa Fawcett Teacher Training College (PFTTC) in Streatham, where he met Christine Chapman; the couple married in 1973. Hoping to build a broader anti-Conservative coalition in Lambeth Borough, Livingstone encouraged members of the British Black Panthers' Brixton branch to join Labour and began associating with the Schools' Action Union (SAU) founded in the wake of the 1968 student protests. His involvement in the SAU led to his dismissal from the PFTCC student's union, which disagreed with politicising secondary school pupils.

=== Lambeth Housing Committee: 1971–1973 ===
"It was intoxicating to be at what seemed at the time the centre of events. We were pushing ahead with our schemes. We had honoured our pledge that pensioners should travel free on London Transport buses. We introduced the provision of free contraception for anyone who lived or worked in the borough. When Mrs Thatcher (then Education Secretary) made it illegal for Education Authorities to give children free school milk, Lambeth – which was not an education authority – stepped in to continue paying for the service."

— Ken Livingstone on the Labour-run Lambeth Borough Council in the early 1970s (1987).

Ahead of the 1971 London local elections, Livingstone and his party allies focused their campaign on the marginal seats in the south of Lambeth Borough, leaving the safe seats in the north to better established Labour members. In the election, Labour secured every marginal seat in the borough, which returned to Labour control. Livingstone was elected to represent the Knight's Hill ward in May 1971 and was re-elected in 1974.

In 1971, Labour members elected Livingstone vice-chair of Lambeth Borough Council's housing committee, his first job in local government. There, Livingstone and committee chair Ewan Carr cancelled a proposed rent increase for council housing and increased the number of compulsory purchase orders for private-rented properties, converting them to council housing. They also temporarily halted construction of Europe's largest tower blocks and founded a Family Squatting Group to assist homeless families squat in empty houses. These reforms faced opposition. In April 1973, Livingstone stood as a leftist candidate for the housing committee's chair but was defeated by David Stimpson, who reversed many of Livingstone and Carr's reforms.

Livingstone had aligned himself with the left-wing of Labour and, although never adopting Marxism, had befriended party Trotskyists like Chris Knight, Graham Bash and Keith Veness, all members of the Socialist Charter, a Trotskyist cell affiliated with the Revolutionary Communist League that had infiltrated the Labour party. The Trotskyist Ted Knight also influenced Livingstone, convincing him that the government's use of troops to quell The Troubles in Northern Ireland would lead to the violent suppression of Irish republicanism there.

=== Early years on the Greater London Council: 1973–1977 ===
In June 1972, Livingstone was selected as Labour's candidate for Norwood at the Greater London Council (GLC). In the 1973 GLC elections, he won the seat with 11,622 votes, a clear lead over his Conservative rival. Led by Reg Goodwin, the GLC was dominated by Labour, who had 57 seats; around 16 of these Labour members, including Livingstone, were on the party's hard left. Livingstone also remained a Lambeth councillor and vice chair of the Lambeth housing committee. Learning that the council had pursued a policy of allocating the best housing to white working-class families, Livingstone went public with the evidence, which was published in the South London Press. In December 1973, he resigned from the housing committee over what he deemed their refusal to rehouse 76 families residing in dilapidated halfway accommodation.

The GLC's Labour leadership appointed Livingstone vice chairman of the film viewing board responsible for monitoring the release of soft pornography. Like most board members, Livingstone opposed censorship, a view he changed with the increasing availability of extreme pornography. With growing support from Labour leftists, in March 1974 he was elected to the executive of the Greater London Labour Party (GLLP), responsible for drawing up the GLC Labour group's manifesto and their candidate lists for council and parliamentary seats. He also became vice chair of the GLC's housing management committee, but was sacked in April 1975 for opposing the Goodwin administration's cutting of £50 million from the GLC's housebuilding budget.

With the 1977 GLC elections approaching, Livingstone recognised the difficulty of retaining his Norwood seat. Instead, he was selected to represent a Labour safe seat, Hackney North and Stoke Newington, which resulted in accusations of being a carpetbagger but ensured he was one of the few hard left Labour councillors remaining on the GLC when it passed into Conservative control under Horace Cutler.

=== Hampstead: 1977–1980 ===
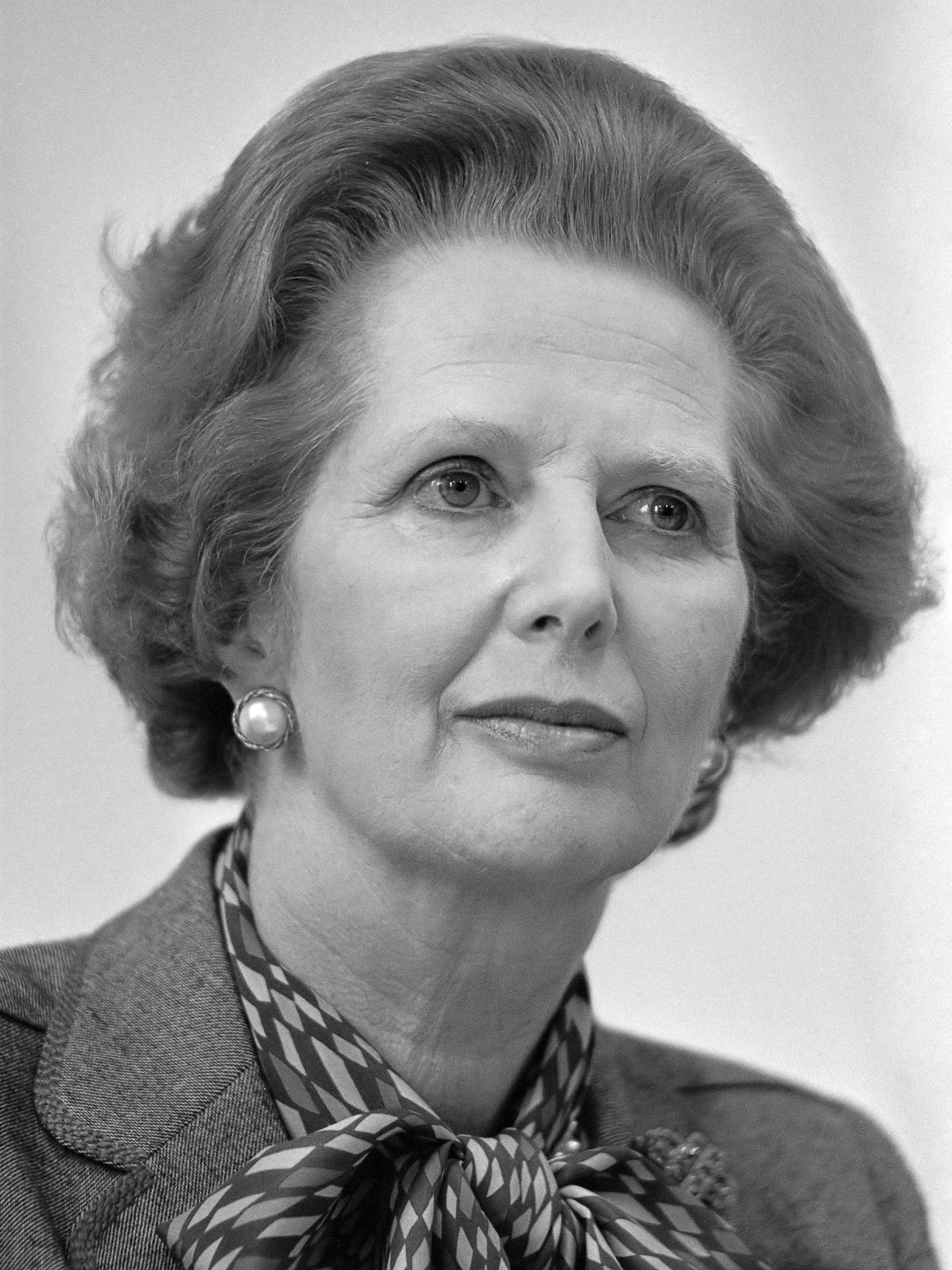
Margaret Thatcher, leader (1975–90) of the Conservative Party, prime minister (1979–90) of the United Kingdom

After Livingstone and his wife moved to West Hampstead, north London, in June 1977 he defeated Vince Cable to become the local Labour branch's parliamentary candidate for the Hampstead constituency. Livingstone gained notoriety in the Hampstead and Highgate Express for publicly calling for a reduction of the age of consent for male same-sex activity from 21 to 16, in line with the heterosexual age of consent. In July 1978, Livingstone helped form a small hard left group, the Socialist Campaign for a Labour Victory (SCLV), which produced a sporadically published newspaper, the Socialist Organiser. This accused the Labour Prime Minister, James Callaghan, of being "anti-working class".

Becoming active in the London Borough of Camden, Livingstone was elected chair of Camden's housing committee. He implemented reforms including encouraging local people to attend council housing meetings, freezing rents for a year, reforming the rate collection system, changing rent arrears procedures and implementing further compulsory purchase orders to increase council housing. Some senior colleagues accused him of incompetence and excessive ambition, with allegations arising that he was encouraging leftists to move into the borough's council housing to increase his local support base.

In 1979, public sector strikes led to wider shut-downs, termed the Winter of Discontent. In Camden Borough, council employees unionised under the National Union of Public Employees (NUPE) went on strike, demanding wage increases and a 35-hour limit to their working week. Livingstone backed the strikers, with Camden Council agreeing to their demands. District auditor Ian Pickwell, a government-appointed accountant who monitored council finances, claimed that this move was reckless and illegal. A court case ensued in which Livingstone, if found guilty, could have been forced to pay the substantial surcharge and been disqualified for public office for five years; ultimately the judge dismissed the case.

In the May 1979 general election, Livingstone stood as Labour's candidate for Hampstead but was defeated by Conservative incumbent Geoffrey Finsberg. The Conservative leader Margaret Thatcher became prime minister, implementing pro-free market policies and becoming a vocal opponent of Livingstone. Livingstone blamed Labour's electoral loss on Callaghan and the Parliamentary Labour Party, calling for greater internal party democracy and a turn towards a socialist platform. This was echoed by Labour's hard left, whose dominant figure, Tony Benn, came to be regarded as "an inspiration and a prophet" by Livingstone.

== Greater London Council leadership ==
=== Becoming leader of the GLC: 1979–1981 ===
Inspired by Benn's supporters, Livingstone planned a GLC take-over. In October 1979, he called a meeting titled "Taking over the GLC" and started publication of a monthly newsletter, the London Labour Briefing. Focused on increasing leftist power in the London Labour Party, he urged socialists to stand as candidates in the upcoming GLC election. When the time came to choose who would lead London Labour in that election, Livingstone put his name down, but was challenged by the moderate Andrew McIntosh; in the April 1980 vote, McIntosh beat Livingstone by 14 votes to 13. In September 1980, Livingstone separated from his wife, though they remained amicable. Moving into a small flat at 195 Randolph Avenue, Maida Vale, he divorced in October 1982 and began a relationship with Kate Allen, chair of Camden Council women's committee.

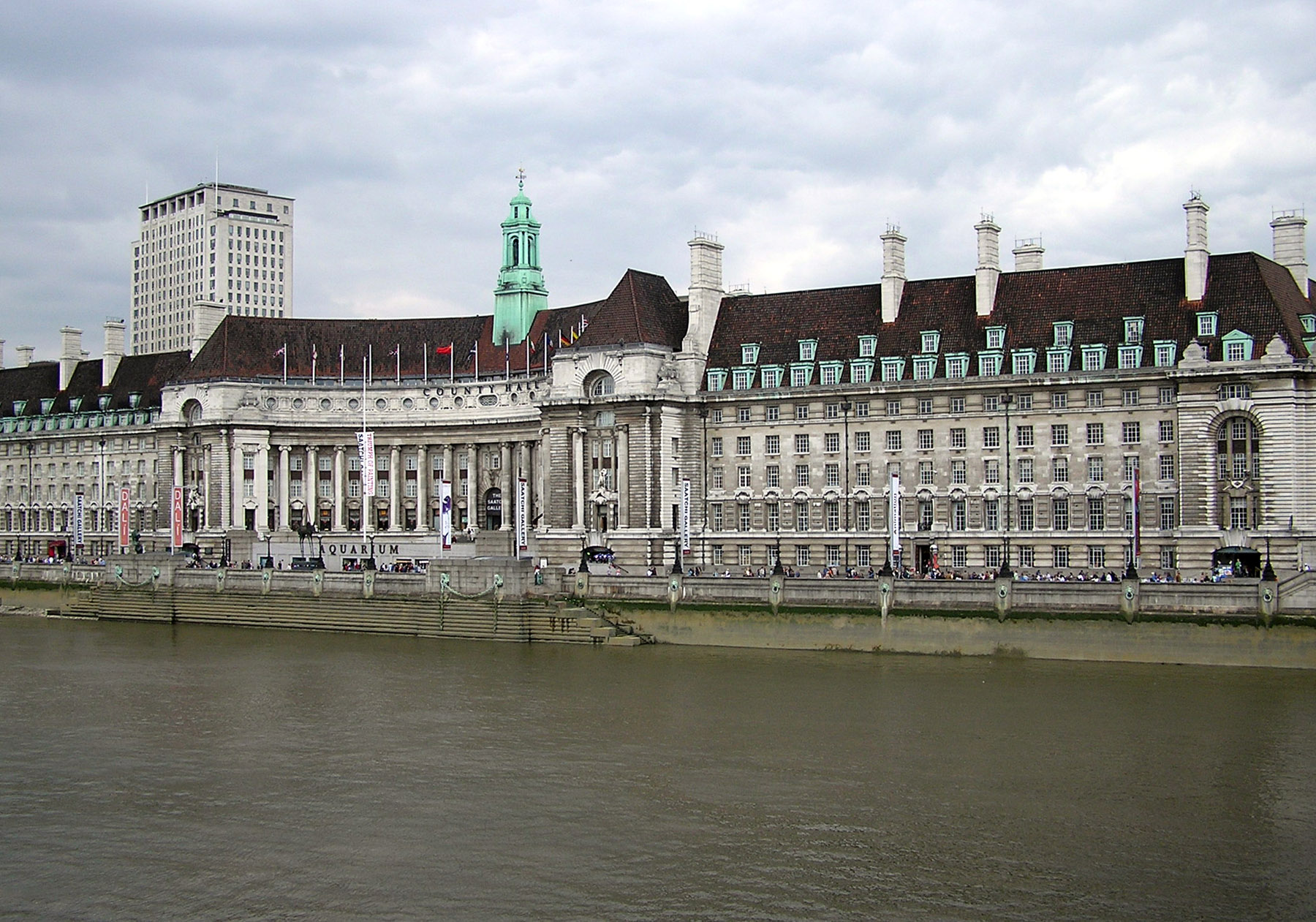
County Hall in Lambeth, then home of the Greater London Council

Livingstone turned his attention to achieving a GLC Labour victory, exchanging his Hackney North safe seat for the marginal seat of Paddington; in May 1981 he won it by 2,397 votes. Cutler and the Conservatives learned of Livingstone's plans, proclaiming that a GLC Labour victory would lead to a Marxist takeover of London and then Britain; the Conservative press picked up the story, with the Daily Express using the headline of "Why We Must Stop These Red Wreckers". The media coverage was ineffective, and the GLC election of May 1981 led to Labour gaining power, with McIntosh installed as Head of the GLC; within 24 hours he was deposed by members of his own party, and replaced by Livingstone.

On 7 May, Livingstone called a caucus of his supporters, announcing his intention of challenging McIntosh's GLC leadership and inviting supporters to stand for other GLC posts. At that evening's GLC meeting, Livingstone's supporters called an immediate leadership election, in which Livingstone defeated Macintosh by 30 votes to 20. The entire left caucus slate was then elected. The next day, a leftist coup deposed Sir Ashley Bramall on the Inner London Education Authority (ILEA), replacing him with Bryn Davies; the left group now controlled both the GLC and the ILEA. McIntosh denounced the takeover as illegitimate and warned that similar tactics would lead to a hard left seizure of Labour.

Mainstream press were also critical. The Daily Mail called Livingstone a "left wing extremist", while The Sun nicknamed him "Red Ken" and stated that his victory meant "full-steam-ahead red-blooded Socialism for London." Thatcher warned that socialists like Livingstone had "no time for parliamentary democracy" and were plotting "To impose upon this nation a tyranny which the peoples of Eastern Europe yearn to cast aside."

=== Leader of the GLC: 1981–1983 ===
Entering County Hall as GLC leader on 8 May 1981, Livingstone initiated changes, converting the building's Freemasonic temple into a meeting room and removing many of the privileges enjoyed by GLC members and senior officers. He initiated an open-door policy allowing citizens to hold meetings in the committee rooms free of charge, with County Hall gaining the nickname of "the People's Palace". In the London Labour Briefing, Livingstone stated that his administration's job was to "sustain a holding operation until such time as the Tory [Conservative] government can be brought down and replaced by a left-wing Labour government." There was a perception among Livingstone's allies that they, and not Foot's Labour leadership, constituted the real opposition to Thatcher's government.

"There is nothing that happens to you at any stage in your life that can prepare you for the British Press in full hue and cry. As a socialist I started out with the lowest possible opinion of Fleet Street and was amazed to discover that they managed to sink even lower than I expected... I would spend hours carefully explaining our policies only to open the paper the next morning and see instead a smear about my sex-life, alleged personality defects or some completely fabricated account of a meeting or a split that never actually happened."

— Ken Livingstone, 1987.

There was a widespread public perception that Livingstone's GLC leadership was illegitimate, while the mainstream British media remained resolutely hostile. Livingstone received the levels of national press attention normally reserved for senior Members of Parliament. A press interview was arranged with Max Hastings for the Evening Standard, in which Livingstone was portrayed as affable but ruthless. The Sun's editor Kelvin MacKenzie took a particular interest in Livingstone, establishing a reporting team to 'dig up the dirt' on him; they were unable to uncover any scandalous information, focusing on his interest in amphibians, a hobby mocked by other media sources. The satirical journal Private Eye referred to him as "Ken Leninspart", a combination of Vladimir Lenin and the German left-wing group, the Spartacus League, proceeding to erroneously claim that Livingstone received funding from the Libyan Jamahiriya. After Livingstone sued them for libel, in November 1983 the journal apologised, paying him £15,000 in damages in an out-of-court settlement.

During 1982, Livingstone made new appointments to the GLC governance, with John McDonnell appointed key chair of finance and Valerie Wise chair of the new Women's Committee, while Sir Ashley Bramall became GLC chairman and Tony McBrearty was appointed chair of housing. Others stayed in their former positions, including Dave Wetzel as transport chair and Mike Ward as chair of industry; thus was created what biographer John Carvel described as "the second Livingstone administration", leading to a "more calm and supportive environment". Turning his attention once more to Parliament, Livingstone sought to be selected as the Labour candidate for the constituency of Brent East, a place which he felt an "affinity" for and where several of his friends lived. At the time, the Brent East Labour Party was characterised by competing factions, with Livingstone attempting to gain the support of both the hard and soft left. Securing a significant level of support from local party members, he nonetheless failed to apply for the candidacy in time, and so the incumbent centrist Reg Freeson was once more selected as Labour candidate for Brent East. A subsequent vote at the council meeting revealed that 52 local Labour members would have voted for Livingstone, with only 2 for Freeson and 3 abstentions. Nevertheless, in the 1983 United Kingdom general election, Freeson went on to win the Brent East constituency for Labour. In 1983, Livingstone began co-presenting a late night television chat show with Janet Street-Porter for London Weekend Television.

==== Fares Fair and transport policy ====
The Greater London Labour Manifesto for the 1981 elections, although written under McIntosh's leadership, had been determined by a special conference of the London Labour Party in October 1980 in which Livingstone's speech had been decisive on transport policy. The manifesto focused on job creation schemes and cutting London Transport fares, and it was to these issues that Livingstone's administration turned. One primary manifesto focus had been a pledge known as Fares Fair, which focused on reducing London Underground fares and freezing them at that lower rate. Based on a fare freeze implemented by the South Yorkshire Metropolitan County Council in 1975, it was widely considered to be a moderate and mainstream policy by Labour, which it was hoped would get more Londoners using public transport, thereby reducing congestion. In October 1981, the GLC implemented their policy, cutting London Transport fares by 32%; to fund the move, the GLC planned to increase the London rates.

The legality of the Fares Fair policy was challenged by Dennis Barkway, Conservative leader of the London Borough of Bromley council, who complained that his constituents were having to pay for cheaper fares on the London Underground when it did not operate in their borough. Although the Divisional Court initially found in favour of the GLC, Bromley Borough took the issue to the Court of Appeal, where three judges – Lord Denning, Lord Justice Oliver and Lord Justice Watkins – reversed the previous decision, finding in favour of Bromley Borough on 10 November. They proclaimed that the Fares Fair policy was illegal because the GLC was forbidden from running London Transport at a deficit. The GLC appealed, taking the case to the House of Lords; on 17 December five Law Lords unanimously ruled in favour of Bromley Borough Council, permanently ending the Fares Fair policy. Livingstone believed that the judicial decision was politically motivated.

Livingstone initially presented a motion to the GLC Labour groups that they refused to comply with the judicial decision, but was out-voted by 32 to 22, with many commentators claiming that he was bluffing to save face among Labour's left-wing. Livingstone then backed a campaign known as "Keep Fares Fair" to bring about a change in the law that would make the Fares Fair policy legal. One aspect of the London Transport reforms was however maintained; the new system of flat fares within ticket zones, and the inter-modal Travelcard ticket continues as the basis of the ticketing system. The GLC then put together new measures in the hope of reducing London Transport fares by the more modest amount of 25%, taking them back to roughly the price that they were when Livingstone's administration took office; it was ruled legal in January 1983, and subsequently implemented.

==== GLEB and nuclear disarmament ====
Livingstone's administration founded the Greater London Enterprise Board (GLEB) to create employment by investing in the industrial regeneration of London, with the funds provided by the council, its workers' pension fund and the financial markets. Livingstone later claimed that GLC bureaucrats obstructed much of what GLEB tried to achieve. Other policies implemented by the Labour Left also foundered. Attempts to prevent the sale-off of GLC council housing largely failed, in part due to the strong opposition from the Conservative government. ILEA attempted to carry through with its promise to cut the price of school meals in the capital from 35p to 25p, but was forced to abandon its plans following legal advice that the councillors could be made to pay the surcharge and disqualified from public office.

The Livingstone administration took a strong stance on the issue of nuclear disarmament, proclaiming London a "nuclear-free zone". On 20 May 1981, the GLC halted its annual spending of £1 million on nuclear war defence plans, with Livingstone's deputy, Illtyd Harrington, proclaiming that "we are challenging... the absurd cosmetic approach to Armageddon." They published the names of the 3000 politicians and administrators who had been earmarked for survival in underground bunkers in the event of a nuclear strike on London. Thatcher's government remained highly critical of these moves, putting out a propaganda campaign explaining their argument for the necessity of Britain's nuclear deterrent to counter the Soviet Union.

==== Egalitarian policies ====
"Arguing that politics had long been the near-exclusive preserve of white middle-aged men, the GLC began an attempt to open itself to representations from other groups, principally from women, the working-class, ethnic minorities and homosexuals but also from children and the elderly. This was a real break from traditional politics as practised centrally by both major parties... and it attracted hostility from all sides."

— Historian Alwyn W. Turner, 2010.

Livingstone's administration advocated measures to improve the lives of minorities within London, who together made up a sizeable percentage of the city's population; what Reg Race called "the Rainbow Coalition". The GLC allocated a small percentage of its expenditure on funding minority community groups, including the London Gay Teenage Group, English Collective of Prostitutes, Women Against Rape, Lesbian Line, A Woman's Place, and Rights of Women. Believing these groups could initiate social change, the GLC increased its annual funding of voluntary organisations from £6 million in 1980 to £50 million in 1984. They provided loans to such groups, coming under a barrage of press criticism for awarding a loan to the Sheba Feminist Publishers, whose works were widely labelled pornographic. In July 1981, Livingstone founded the Ethnic Minorities Committee, the Police Committee, and the Gay and Lesbian Working Party, and in June 1982, a Women's Committee was also established. Believing the Metropolitan Police to be a racist organisation, he appointed Paul Boateng to head the Police Committee and monitor the force's activities. Considering the police a highly political organisation, he publicly remarked that "When you canvas police flats at election time, you find that they are either Conservatives who think of Thatcher as a bit of a pinko or they are National Front."

Livingstone at an anti-racism march around the early 1980s

The Conservatives and mainstream press were largely critical of these measures, considering them symptomatic of what they termed the "loony left". Claiming that these only served "fringe" interests, their criticisms often exhibited racist, homophobic and sexist sentiment. A number of journalists fabricated stories designed to discredit Livingstone and the "loony left", for instance claiming that the GLC made its workers drink only Nicaraguan coffee in solidarity with the country's socialist government, and that Haringey Council leader Bernie Grant had banned the use of the term "black bin liner" and the rhyme "Baa Baa Black Sheep", because they were perceived as racially insensitive. Writing in 2008, BBC reporter Andrew Hosken noted that although most of Livingstone's GLC administration's policies were ultimately a failure, its role in helping change social attitudes towards women and minorities in London remained its "enduring legacy".

==== Republicanism, Ireland and the Labour Herald ====
Invited to the Wedding of Charles, Prince of Wales, and Lady Diana Spencer at St Paul's Cathedral in July 1981, Livingstone – a republican critical of the monarchy – wished the couple well but turned down the offer. He also permitted Irish republican protesters to hold a vigil on the steps of County Hall throughout the wedding celebrations, both actions that brought strong press criticism. His administration supported the People's March for Jobs, a demonstration of 500 anti-unemployment protesters who marched to London from Northern England, allowing them to sleep in County Hall and catering for them. Costing £19,000, critics argued that Livingstone was illegally using public money for his own political causes. The GLC orchestrated a propaganda campaign against Thatcher's government, in January 1982 erecting a sign on the top of County Hall – clearly visible from the Houses of Parliament – stating the number of unemployed in London.

In September 1981, a weekly newspaper, the Labour Herald, was founded with Livingstone, Ted Knight and Matthew Warburton as co-editors. It was published by a press owned by the Trotskyist Workers Revolutionary Party (WRP), who had financed it with funding from Libya and other countries in the middle east. Evidence is lacking to indicate Livingstone knew about the funding at the time. Livingstone's commercial relationship with WRP leader Gerry Healy was controversial among British socialists, many of whom disapproved of Healy's reputation for violence. In the newspaper in 1982, perceiving a neglect by Labour of the Israel-Palestine conflict, Livingstone wrote of "a distortion running right the way through British politics" because "a majority of Jews in this country supported the Labour Party and elected a number of Jewish Labour MPs". The Labour Herald folded in 1985, after Healy was accused of being a sex offender and he was expelled from the WRP.

"This morning the Sun presents the most odious man in Britain. Take a bow, Mr Livingstone, socialist leader of the Greater London Council. In just a few months since he appeared on the national scene, he has quickly become a joke. But no one can laugh at him any more. The joke has turned sour, sick and obscene. For Mr Livingstone steps forward as the defender and the apologist of the criminal, murderous activities of the IRA."

— The Sun lambasts Livingstone after his support for Irish republicanism.

A supporter of Irish reunification, Livingstone had connections with the left-wing Irish republican party Sinn Féin and in July, met with the mother of an imprisoned Provisional Irish Republican Army (IRA) militant Thomas McElwee, then taking part in the 1981 Irish hunger strike. That day, Livingstone publicly proclaimed his support for those prisoners on hunger strike, claiming that the British government's fight against the IRA was not "some sort of campaign against terrorism" but was "the last colonial war". He was criticised for this meeting and his statements in the mainstream press, while Prime Minister Thatcher said that his comments constituted "the most disgraceful statement I have ever heard." Soon after, he also met with the children of Yvonne Dunlop, an Irish Protestant who had been killed in McElwee's bomb attack.

On 10 October, the IRA bombed London's Chelsea Barracks, killing 2 and injuring 40. Denouncing the attack, Livingstone informed members of the Cambridge University Tory Reform Group that it was a misunderstanding to view the IRA as "criminals or lunatics" because of their political motives and that "violence will recur again and again as long as we are in Ireland." Mainstream press criticised him for these comments, with The Sun labeling him "the most odious man in Britain". In response, Livingstone proclaimed that the press coverage had been "ill-founded, utterly out of context and distorted", reiterating his opposition both to IRA attacks and British rule in Northern Ireland. Anti-Livingstone pressure mounted and on 15 October he was attacked in the street by members of unionist militia, The Friends of Ulster. In a second incident, Livingstone was attacked by far right skinheads shouting "commie bastard" at the Three Horseshoes Pub in Hampstead. Known as "Green Ken" among Ulster Unionists, Unionist paramilitary Michael Stone of the Ulster Defence Association plotted to kill Livingstone, only abandoning the plan when he became convinced that the security services were monitoring him.

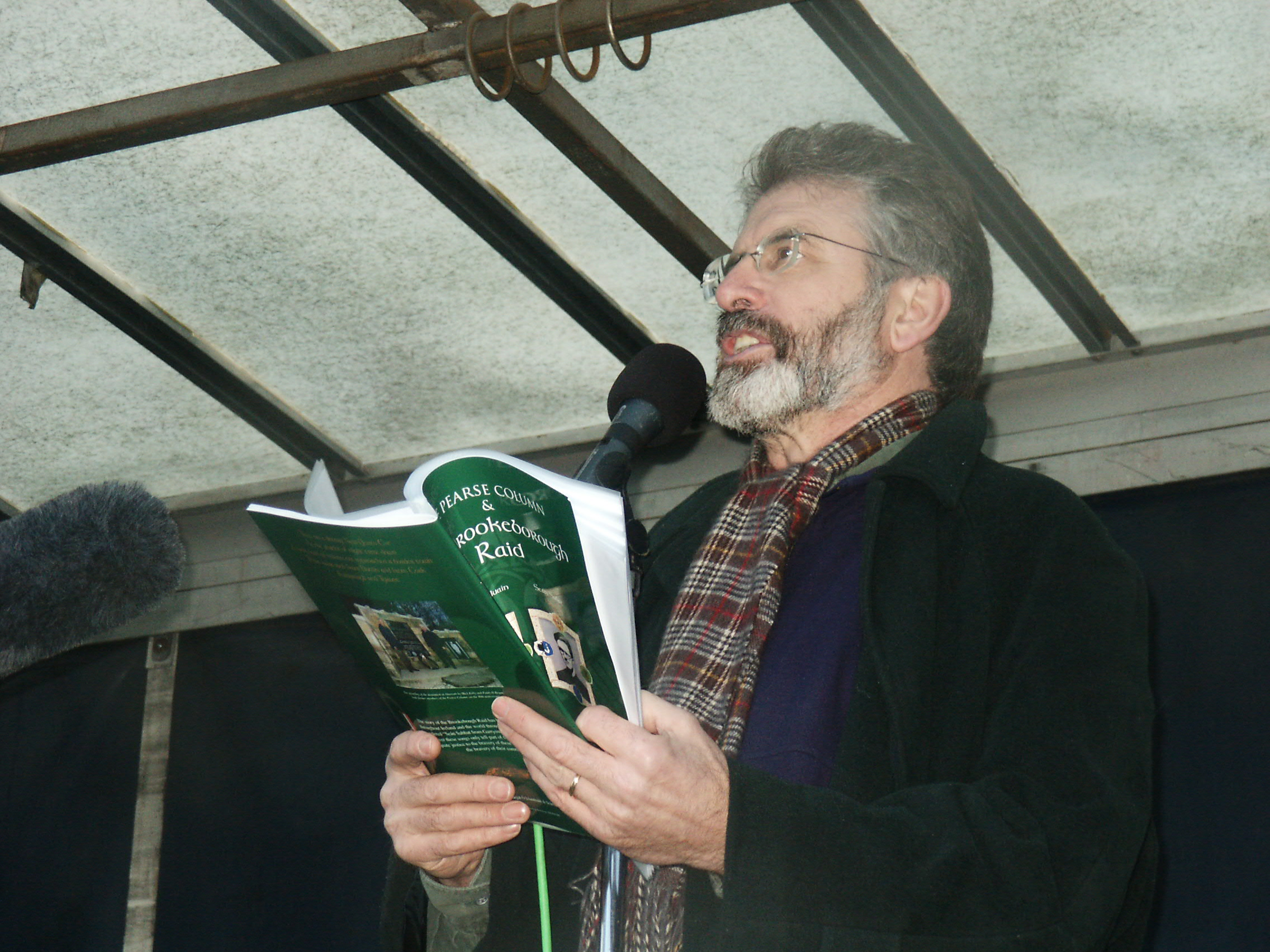
Livingstone's willingness to meet publicly with Irish republican leader Gerry Adams (above, pictured in 2001), caused outrage within his own party and the British press

Livingstone agreed to meet Gerry Adams, Sinn Féin President and IRA-supporter, after Adams was invited to London by Labour members of the Troops Out campaign in December 1982. The same day as the invitation was made, the Irish National Liberation Army (INLA) bombed The Droppin Well bar in Ballykelly, County Londonderry, killing 11 soldiers and six civilians; in the aftermath, Livingstone was pressured to cancel the meeting. Expressing his horror at the bombing, Livingstone insisted that the meeting proceed, for Adams had no connection with the INLA, but Conservative Home Secretary Willie Whitelaw banned Adams' entry to Britain with the 1976 Prevention of Terrorism (Temporary Provisions) Act. In February 1983, Livingstone visited Adams in his constituency of West Belfast, receiving a hero's welcome from local republicans. In July 1983, Adams finally came to London by invitation of Livingstone and MP Jeremy Corbyn, allowing him to present his views to a mainstream British audience through televised interviews. In August, Livingstone was interviewed on Irish state radio, proclaiming that Britain's 800-year occupation of Ireland was more destructive than the Holocaust; he was publicly criticised by Labour members and the press. He also controversially expressed solidarity with the Marxist–Leninist government of Fidel Castro in Cuba against the U.S. economic embargo, in return receiving an annual Christmas gift of Cuban rum from the Cuban embassy.

Courting further controversy, in the Falklands War of 1982, during which the United Kingdom battled Argentina for control of the Falkland Islands, Livingstone stated his belief that the islands rightfully belonged to the Argentinian people, but not the military junta then ruling the country. Upon British victory, he sarcastically remarked that "Britain had finally been able to beat the hell out of a country smaller, weaker and even worse governed than we were." Challenging the Conservative government's militarism, the GLC proclaimed 1983 to be "Peace Year", solidifying ties with the Campaign for Nuclear Disarmament (CND) in order to advocate international nuclear disarmament, a measure opposed by the Thatcher government. In keeping with this pacifistic outlook, they banned the Territorial Army from marching past County Hall that year. The GLC then proclaimed 1984 to be "Anti-Racism Year". In July 1985, the GLC twinned London with the Nicaraguan city of Managua, then under the control of the socialist Sandinista National Liberation Front. The press continued to criticise the Livingstone administration's funding of volunteer groups that they perceived represented only "fringe interests". As Livingstone biographer Andrew Hosken remarked, "by far the most contentious grant" was given in February 1983 to a group called Babies Against the Bomb, founded by a group of mothers who had united to campaign against nuclear weapons.

Members of London Labour groups chastised Livingstone for his controversial statements, believing them detrimental to the party, leading Labour members and supporters to defect to the Social Democratic Party (SDP). Many highlighted Labour's failure to secure the seat in the 1981 Croydon North West by-election as a sign of Labour's prospects under Livingstone. Some called for Livingstone's removal, but Michael Foot's assistant Una Cooze defended Livingstone's position. Television and radio outlets invited Livingstone for interviews; described by biographer John Carvel as having "one of the best television styles of any contemporary politician", Livingstone used this medium to speak to a wider audience, gaining widespread public support, something Carvel attributed to his "directness, self-deprecation, colourful language, complete unflappability under fire and lack of pomposity", coupled with popular policies like Fares Fair.

=== Abolition of the GLC: 1983–1986 ===
"Whatever the long-term achievements of Livingstone's administration, there is no question that its aggression towards the government and the Establishment ultimately spelled doom for the GLC. In the eyes of the government and the media, Livingstone started badly and got worse. Within eight months, he was in deep crisis and within two years, Margaret Thatcher had started the wheels in motion for abolition. Such was the backlash by judges, civil servants, politicians and journalists that Livingstone failed not only in the key objective of bringing down Thatcher but also in implementing many of his policies. It would lay Livingstone open to the allegation that he had laid the GLC at the sacrificial altar of his ambition."

— Biographer Andrew Hosken (2008).

After Labour lost the 1983 general election and Thatcher entered her second term in office, Foot was replaced by Neil Kinnock, a man Livingstone considered "repellent". Livingstone attributed Labour's defeat to the party's economic policies, arguing that the party should promote a socialist program of "national reconstruction", including the nationalisation of banks and major industry.

The Conservative's 1983 electoral manifesto had promised to abolish the GLC, describing it as a waste of rate payer's money, and devolve control to the Greater London boroughs. Political differences between Livingstone and Thatcher's administration contributed to this decision; Livingstone described "a huge gulf between the cultural values of the GLC Labour group and everything that Mrs Thatcher considered right and proper." Thatcher's government felt confident that they could successfully abolish the GLC given that a MORI poll of April 1983 found that 58% of Londoners were dissatisfied with Livingstone, to only 26% satisfied.

Attempting to fight the proposals, the GLC devoted £11 million to a campaign led by Reg Race focusing on press campaigning, advertising, and parliamentary lobbying. The campaign sent Livingstone on a party roadshow conference in which he convinced the Liberal and Social Democratic parties to oppose abolition. Using the slogan "say no to no say", they publicly highlighted that without the GLC, London would be the only Western European capital city without a directly elected body. In March 1984, 20,000 public servants held a 24-hour strike in support. The government pushed ahead and in June 1984 the House of Commons passed the Local Government Act 1985 with 237 votes in favour and 217 against. In August, Livingstone and three senior GLC members resigned their seats to force byelections on the issue of abolition, but the Conservatives declined to contest them and all four were comfortably re-elected on a low turnout.

The GLC was formally abolished at midnight on 31 March 1986, with Livingstone marking the occasion by holding a free concert at Festival Hall. In his capacity as former leader of the GLC, Livingstone was invited to visit Australia, Israel, and Zimbabwe in the following months by leftist groups in those countries, before he and Allen undertook a 5-week Himalayan trek to the base camp of Mount Everest.

== Member of Parliament ==
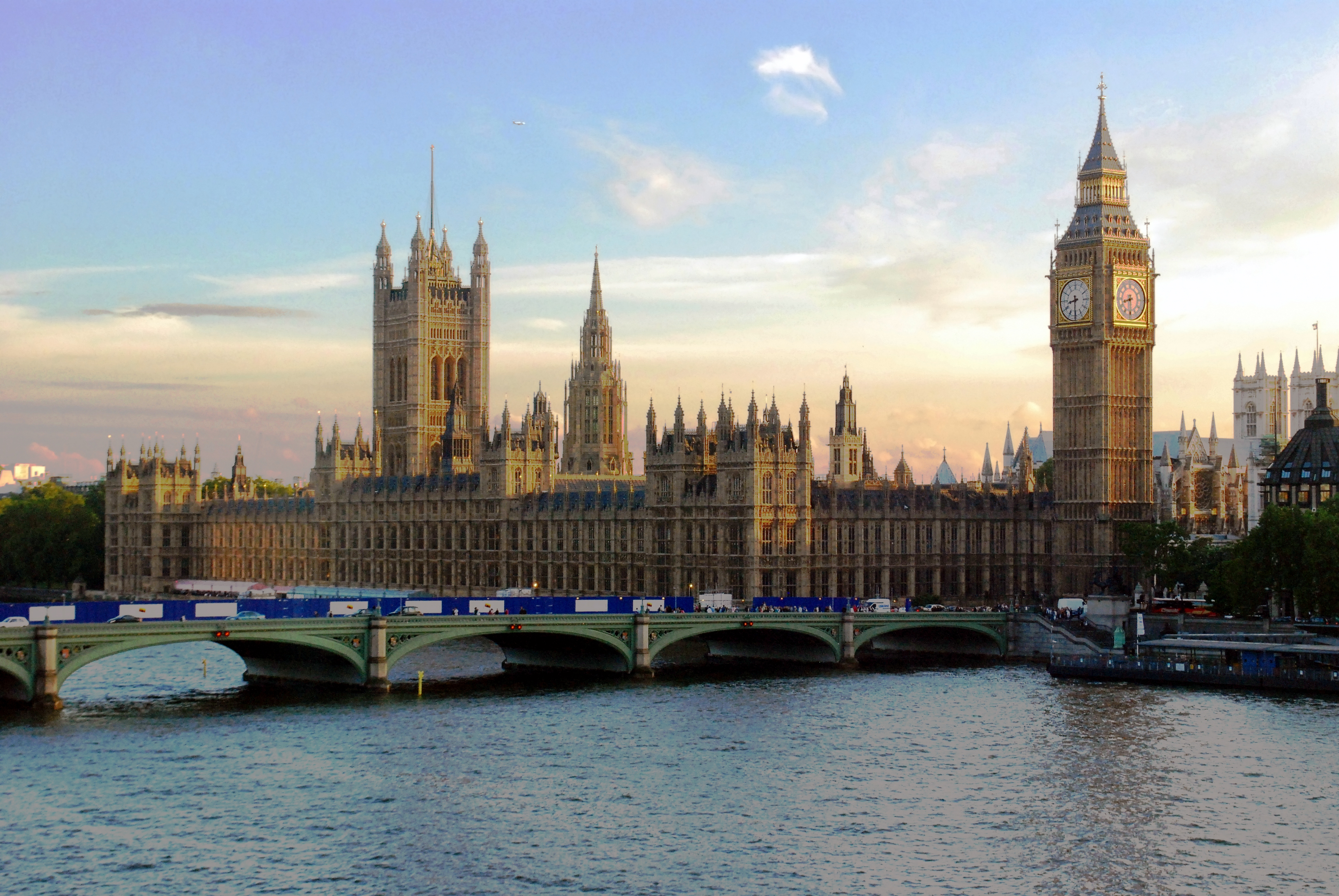
The Houses of Parliament, where Livingstone served as MP

Livingstone defeated Reg Freeson in the selection process to represent Labour for the London constituency of Brent East in the 1987 general election. At the election, he narrowly defeated Conservative candidate Harriet Crawley, while Thatcher retained the premiership for a third term. Livingstone found the Houses of Parliament uncomfortable, claiming: "It's like working in the Natural History Museum, except not all the exhibits are stuffed."

In his July 1987 maiden speech to the House of Commons, Livingstone used parliamentary privilege to raise allegations made by Fred Holroyd, a former Special Intelligence Service operative, that MI5 had colluded with Ulster loyalist paramilitaries in the 1970s. Thatcher called his claims "utterly contemptible". In September 1987 Livingstone was elected to Labour's National Executive Committee (NEC), although he was voted off in October 1989 and replaced by John Prescott. As Kinnock tried to pull Labour to the centre, Livingstone worked to strengthen its socialist elements. Livingstone continued to associate with the Trotskyist Socialist Action, whose leader, John Ross, became his most important advisor. He and Ross began publishing the Socialist Economic Bulletin in 1990; in 1991, Socialist Action was involved in forming the Anti-Racist Alliance, which Livingstone became closely associated with. Two other members of Socialist Action, Redmond O'Neill and Simon Fletcher, also became Livingstone's trusted advisers. In parliament, he refused to pay the controversial poll tax until it was revoked, and was one of 55 Labour MPs to oppose British involvement in the 1991 Gulf War.

"I want power. I want to change Britain and I'm not ashamed to say it. Anyone who wants to achieve change would grab at the leadership."

— Ken Livingstone on the Labour leadership, 1986.

After John Major led the Conservatives to victory at the 1992 general election, Kinnock resigned as Labour leader. The Socialist Campaign Group proposed Livingstone as his successor, but John Smith won the contest. After Smith died in 1994, Livingstone endorsed Margaret Beckett for party leader, however Tony Blair was selected, with Livingstone predicting that Blair would be "the most right-wing leader" in Labour history. Blair's "New Labour" project sought to pull the party to the centre, with prominent Blairite Peter Mandelson identifying figures like Livingstone as "the enemy" of their reforms. Throughout 1995, Livingstone unsuccessfully fought Blair's attempts to remove Clause Four (promoting nationalised industry) from the Labour constitution, which he saw as a betrayal of the party's socialist roots.

Blair led Labour to victory in the 1997 general election; that year, Livingstone was re-elected to the Labour NEC, beating Mandelson to the position. Livingstone opposed Blair's government on various issues. In December 1997, he was among the Labour MPs to oppose benefit cuts and in March 1998 he expressed opposition to government attempts to privatise the infrastructure of London underground through the PPP scheme. On other issues, he backed Blair's government, for instance supporting the 1999 bombing of Serbia.

As his political significance waned, Livingstone gained more media work, commenting that the press "started to use me only once they thought I was harmless". To receive these outside earnings, he founded the company Localaction Ltd. He wrote articles for the London Daily News, stood in for BBC Radio 2 disk-jockey Jimmy Young, and served as a judge for the 1987 Whitbread Prize. That year, HarperCollins published his autobiography, If Voting Changed Anything They'd Abolish It; in 1989, Unwin Hyman published his second book, Livingstone's Labour: A Programme for the 90s while that same year he was employed to promote Red Leicester cheese in adverts for the National Dairy Council and to appear in adverts for British Coal alongside Edwina Currie. In October 1991 Livingstone began writing a column for Rupert Murdoch's right-wing tabloid The Sun, a controversial move among British socialists. In his column, he often discussed his love of amphibians and campaigned for the protection of the great crested newt, on the basis of which he was appointed vice president of the London Zoological Society in 1996–97. He subsequently wrote a food column for Esquire and then the Evening Standard, also making regular appearances on the BBC quiz show Have I Got News For You?. In 1995, Livingstone was invited to appear on the track "Ernold Same" by the band Blur.

== Mayor of London ==
=== Mayoral election: 2000 ===
Labour's 1997 election manifesto proposed the introduction of a London Mayor and a Greater London Authority (GLA), with a 1998 referendum resulting in 72% support for the new system. Livingstone announced his desire to stand as Labour's candidate for the mayoralty, however Blair opposed this, calling Livingstone one of those who "almost knocked [Labour] over the edge of the cliff into extinction" during the 1980s. Blair and other senior Labour figures encouraged Frank Dobson to stand against Livingstone. To make Dobson's victory more likely, Blair ensured that a third of the votes would come from the rank-and-file members, a third from the trade unions, and a third from Labour MPs and MEPs. Dobson won the candidacy with 51% to Livingstone's 48%.

Livingstone then announced that he would stand as an independent candidate, for which Labour expelled him. Launching a campaign run by his Socialist Action associates, Livingstone attracted celebrity support from musicians like Fatboy Slim, Pink Floyd, The Chemical Brothers, and Blur, artists like Damien Hirst and Tracey Emin, and those from other fields, among them Ken Loach, Jo Brand, and Chris Evans. Evans donated £200,000 to Livingstone's campaign, half of what he required. In March 2000, Livingstone agreed to make a public apology to the House of Commons, after he was criticised over his failure to properly register outside interests worth more than £150,000. At the May 2000 election, Livingstone came first with 58% of first and second-preference votes; Conservative candidate Steven Norris came second and Dobson third. Livingstone began his acceptance speech with "As I was saying before I was so rudely interrupted 14 years ago..."

=== First mayoral term: 2000–04 ===
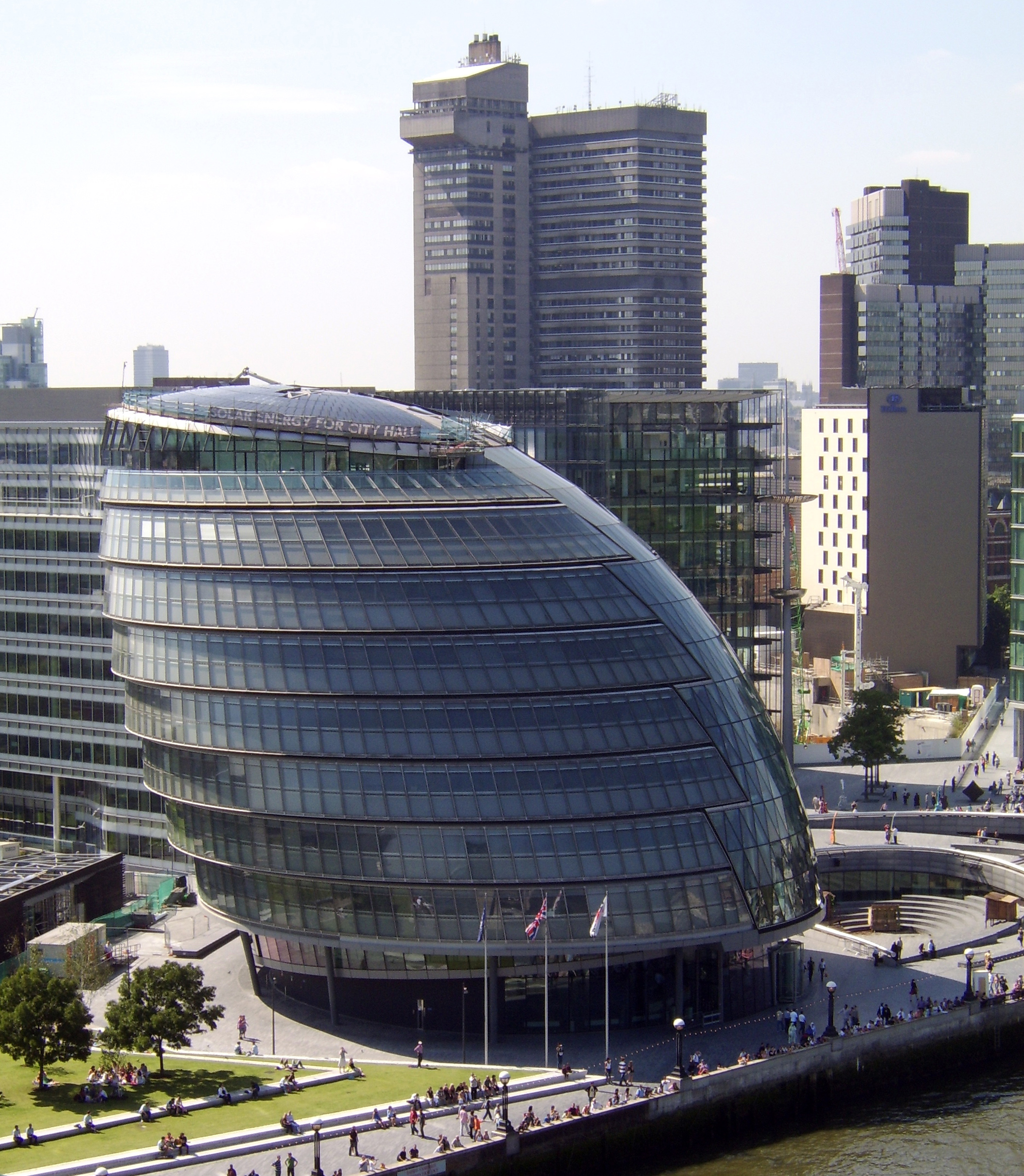
City Hall, opened 2002, specially built for the Greater London Authority and mayor in Southwark

Livingstone, laying claim to "the largest and most direct mandate of any politician in British history", received an annual salary of £87,000. It was the mayor's job to oversee a number of subordinate bodies, including the Metropolitan Police, Transport for London (TfL), the London Development Agency, and the London Fire Brigade, and in doing so he was granted a number of executive powers. He would be scrutinised by the elected London Assembly, whose first chairman was Trevor Phillips, a Labour politician who had a reciprocated dislike of Livingstone. Livingstone was permitted twelve principal advisers, many of whom were members of Socialist Action or people whom he had worked with on the GLC. Ross and Fletcher became two of his closest confidants, with Livingstone commenting that "They aren't just my closest political advisers... they're also mostly my best friends." In 2002, he promoted six of his senior aides, resulting in allegations of cronyism from Assembly members. The mayoral office was initially based in temporary headquarters at Romney House in Marsham Street, Westminster, while a purpose-built building was constructed in Southwark; termed City Hall, it was officially opened by Queen Elizabeth II in July 2002, with Livingstone commenting that it resembled a "glass testicle". Much of Livingstone's first two years were devoted to setting up the mayoral system and administration.

==== Transport and infrastructure reforms ====
He also devoted much time to battling New Labour's plans to upgrade the London Underground system through a public–private partnership (PPP) program, believing it to be too expensive and tantamount to the privatisation of a state-owned service. He furthermore had strong concerns about safety; PPP would divide parts of the Underground among various companies, something that he argued threatened a holistic safety and maintenance program. These concerns were shared by the National Union of Rail, Maritime and Transport Workers (RMT) and the Associated Society of Locomotive Engineers and Firemen (ASLEF) trade union, who went on strike over the issue, being joined on the picket line by Livingstone. Appointing Bob Kiley as transport commissioner — previously chief executive of the MBTA in Greater Boston and the MTA in Greater New York City — the duo argued that the upgrade should be carried out in state hands through a public bond issue, as had been done in the case of the New York City Subway. They launched court cases against the government over PPP in 2001–02, but were ultimately unsuccessful, and the project went ahead, with the maintenance of the Underground's infrastructure being privatised in January 2003.

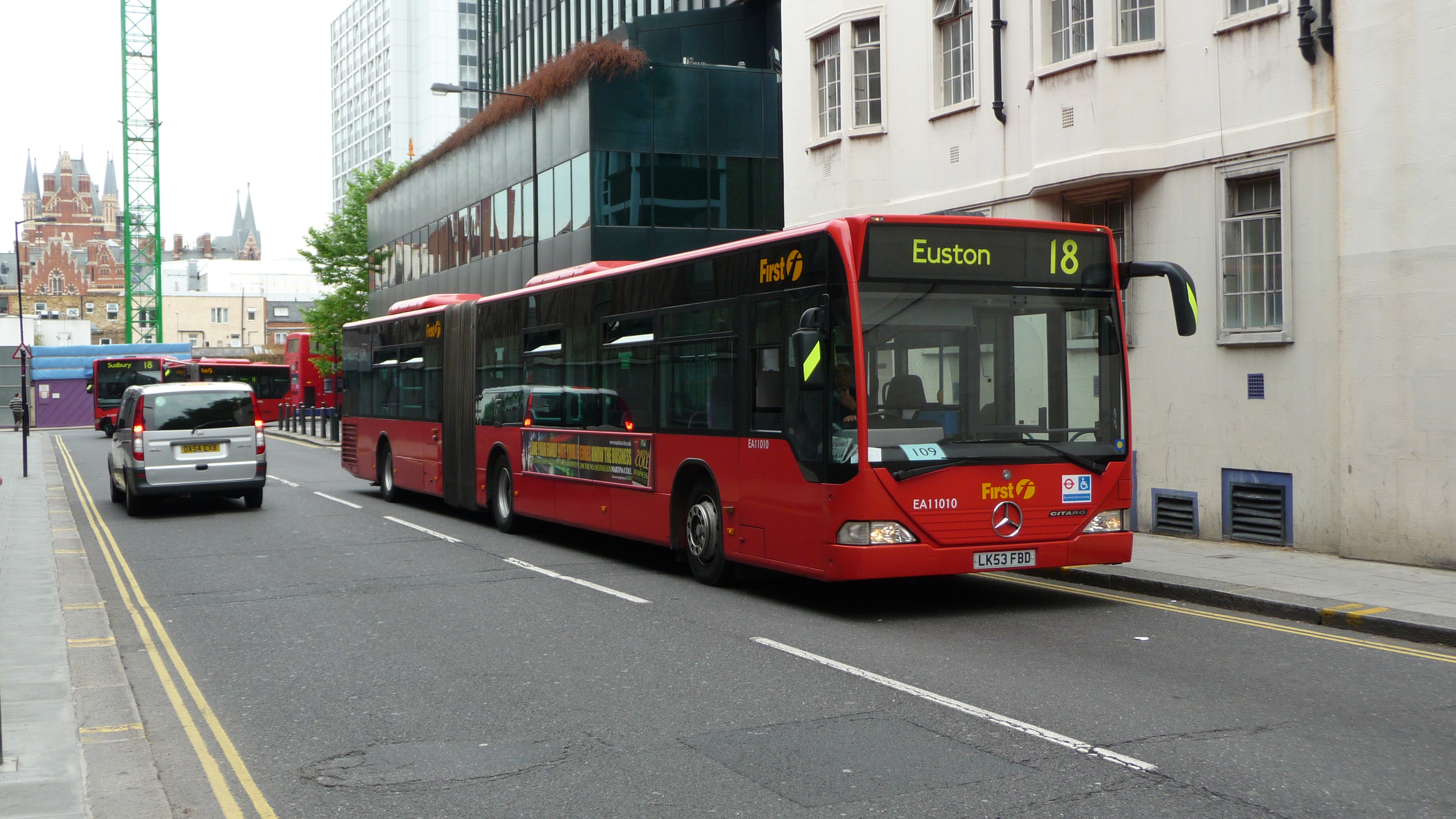
Livingstone's administration introduced the fleet of articulated "bendy buses" to replace the Routemasters

Although he had initially stated that he would not do so, Livingstone's administration sought to phase out use of the high-floor Routemaster buses, the design for which dated to the 1950s. Although iconic, they were deemed hazardous and responsible for a high number of deaths and serious injuries as passengers climbed onto them, also being non-wheelchair accessible and thus not meeting the requirements of the Disability Discrimination Act 1995. Despite criticism from the public, the last Routemaster was decommissioned in December 2005, replaced by a new fleet of low-floor, double decker or articulated buses. Known colloquially as "bendy buses", the articulated buses fitted up to 140 passengers, 60 more than the Routemasters; however they were deemed dangerous for cyclists. By early 2006, all London bus routes used low-floor buses, making the largest accessible bus fleet in the world.

Attempting to reduce London's environmental impact, Livingstone created the London Hydrogen Partnership and the London Energy Partnership in his first term as mayor of London. The mayor's energy strategy, "green light to clean power", committed London to reducing its emissions of carbon dioxide by 20%, relative to the 1990 level, by 2010.

Livingstone sought to remove the pigeons from Trafalgar Square; he tried to evict seed sellers and introduced hawks to scare the pigeons off. He pedestrianised the north side of the square, transforming it into a public space with a cafe, public toilets, and a lift for the disabled. He introduced an annual Saint Patrick's Day festival to celebrate the contributions of the Irish to London, and revived London's free anti-racism music festival, now called Rise: London United, later attributing London's 35% decrease in racist attacks to this and other anti-racist policies. Continuing his support for LGBT rights, in 2001 he set up the London Partnership Register, Britain's first register for same-sex couples; while falling short of legal marriage rights, the register was seen as a step towards the Civil Partnership Act 2004.

Livingstone's relationship with Kate Allen ended in November 2001, although they remained friends. He then started a relationship with Emma Beal, together having two children, Thomas (born December 2002) and Mia (born March 2004). At a May 2002 party in Tufnell Park, Livingstone got into an argument with Beal's friend Robin Hedges, a reporter for the Evening Standard. Hedges subsequently fell from a wall, bruised his ribs and went to hospital; the press claimed that Livingstone had pushed him, although he insisted that he did not. Liberal Democrats on the London Assembly referred the matter to the Standards Board for England, who ruled that there was no evidence for any wrongdoing on Livingstone's behalf.

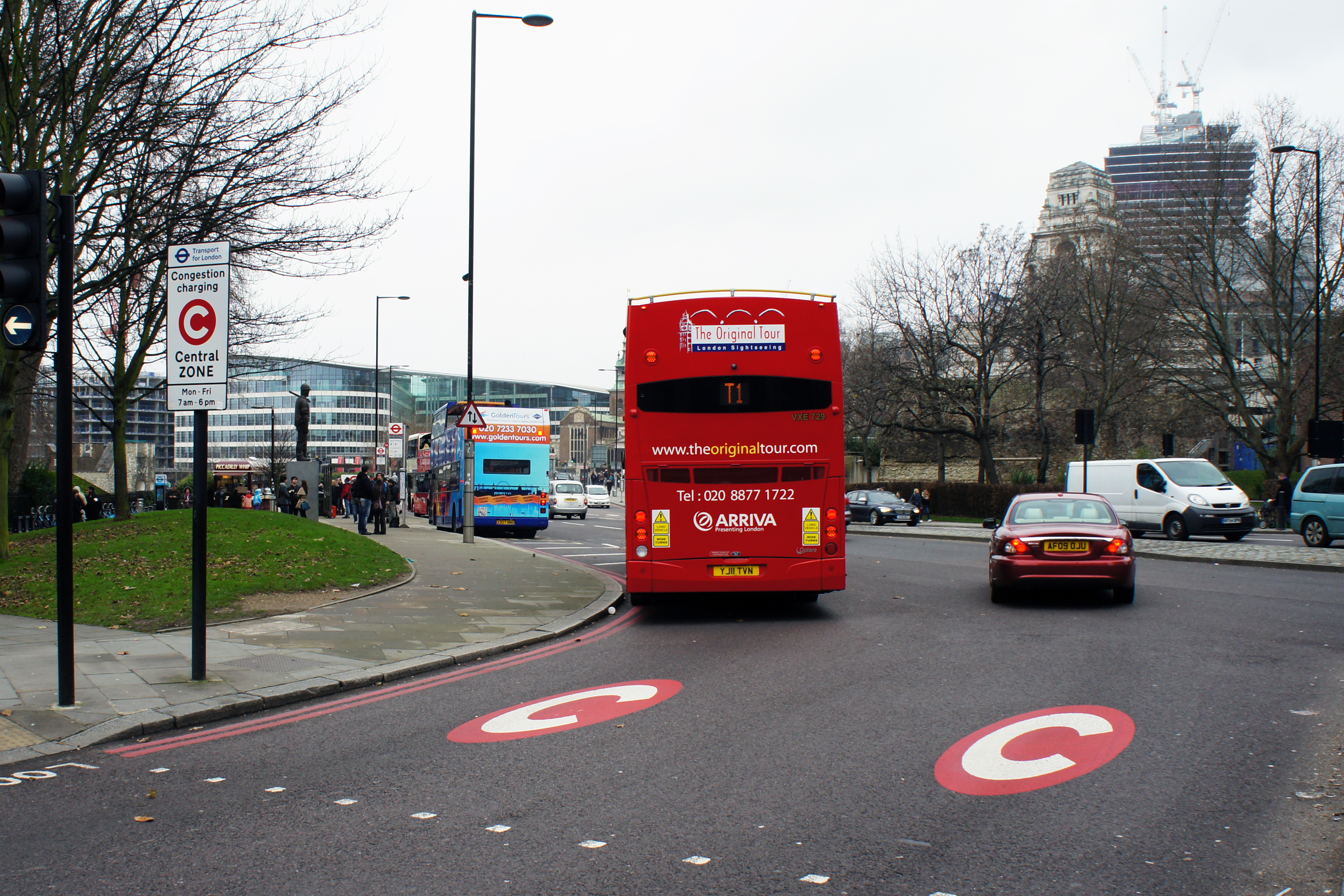
London congestion charge signage

As proposed in their election manifesto, in February 2003 Livingstone's administration introduced a congestion charge covering 8 square miles in central London, charging motorists £5 a day for driving through the area. It was introduced in an attempt to deter traffic and reduce congestion; Livingstone himself took the London Underground to work, and tried to inspire more Londoners to use public transport rather than cars. The policy was strongly opposed by businesses, resident groups, the roads lobby and the Labour government; many commentators recognised that, if opposition resulted in the policy being abandoned, it could lead to the end of Livingstone's political career. That year, the Political Studies Association named Livingstone 'Politician of the Year' due to his implementation of the 'bold and imaginative' scheme. The scheme resulted in a marked reduction on traffic in central London, resulting in improved bus services, and by 2007, TfL could claim that the charge had reduced congestion by 20%. To further encourage the use of public transport, in June 2003, the Oyster card system was introduced, while bus and Underground journeys were made free for people aged 11 to 18.

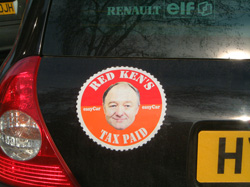
A car rental company's "Red Ken's Tax Paid" car sticker: a negative comment on the congestion charge

In 2002, Livingstone came out in support of a proposal for the 2012 Olympic Games to be held in London. He insisted however that the games must be held in the East End, and result in an urban regeneration program centred on the Lea Valley. He gained the support of Labour's culture secretary Tessa Jowell, who convinced the government to back the plans in May 2003. In May 2004, the International Olympic Commission put London on the shortlist of potential locations for the games, alongside Paris, Madrid, Moscow, and New York City; although Paris was widely expected to be the eventual victor, London would prove successful in its nomination. Another major development project was launched in February 2004 as the London Plan, in which Livingstone's administration laid out their intentions to deal with the city's major housing shortage by ensuring the construction of 30,000 new homes a year. It stressed that 50% of these should be deemed "affordable housing" although later critics would highlight that in actuality, the amount of "affordable housing" in these new constructions did not exceed 30%.

Livingstone had no control over government policy regarding immigration, which had resulted in a significant growth in foreign arrivals coming to London during his administration; from 2000 to 2005 London's population grew by 200,000 to reach 7.5 million. He did not oppose this, encouraging racial equality and celebrating the city's multiculturalism. Livingstone condemned the UK's involvement in the Iraq War and involved himself in the Stop the War campaign. In November 2003, he made headlines for referring to US President George W. Bush as "the greatest threat to life on this planet", just before Bush's official visit to the UK. Livingstone also organised an alternative "Peace Reception" at City Hall "for everybody who is not George Bush", with anti-war Vietnam veteran Ron Kovic as the guest of honour.

==== 2004 mayoral election ====
Labour reconsidered their position on Livingstone, with Blair re-admitting him and asking that he stand as their candidate for the 2004 mayoral election. Livingstone accepted, with Labour mayoral candidate Nicky Gavron agreeing to take a subordinate position as his deputy. In his campaign Livingstone highlighted his record of the congestion charge, free bus travel for under 11s, 1000 extra buses, and 5000 extra police officers; his main competitor, the Conservative Steven Norris, campaigned primarily on abolishing the congestion charge. Livingstone continued to court controversy throughout the campaign; in June 2004 he attracted controversy after stating: "I just long for the day I wake up and find that the Saudi royal family are swinging from lamp-posts". That same month, he came under criticism from sectors of the left for urging RMT members to cross picket lines in a proposed Underground strike because the latest offer had been "extremely generous", leading RMT general secretary Bob Crow to step down as a TfL board member. Livingstone won the 2004 election with 55% of first and second-preference voted to Norris's 45%.

=== Second mayoral term: 2004–08 ===
==== Transport and infrastructure reforms ====
Livingstone (right) with deputy prime minister John Prescott in 2005

In March 2006, Livingstone criticised foreign embassies who refused to pay the congestion charge under the conditions of the 1961 Vienna Convention on Diplomatic Relations. His criticism focused on US diplomat Robert Tuttle, condemning him as a "chiselling little crook" whose embassy was refusing to pay the £1.5 million he believed it owed. In February 2007, Livingstone's administration doubled the congestion charge zone by extending it westwards into Kensington and Chelsea, despite opposition from resident groups. In October 2007, the government agreed to go ahead with Crossrail, a £16 billion project to construct a train line under central London, linking Berkshire to Essex.

Meanwhile, Livingstone felt vindicated in his former opposition to public private partnership when one of the companies who now controlled part of the Underground, Metronet, collapsed in July 2007, with the state having to intervene to protect the service. Livingstone had also welcomed the construction of skyscrapers in London, giving the go ahead for 15 to be constructed during his mayoralty, including 30 St Mary Axe and The Shard. He considered this necessary to fill the demand for office space, but was criticised, most notably by Charles, Prince of Wales, concerned about the preservation of historic skylines.

During his second mayoral term, Livingstone built links with Venezuela's Hugo Chávez (pictured)

In May 2006, Livingstone welcomed Venezuela's socialist president Hugo Chávez to London, hosting an event for him at City Hall. Conservatives objected, arguing that Chávez had undermined pluralistic democracy. Livingstone subsequently became president of the pro-Chávez Venezuelan Information Centre. In November 2006, Livingstone travelled to Latin America to visit Chávez, during which he and his entourage stayed in Cuba at a cost of £29,000; many British sources described the visit as a waste of tax-payer's money. In August 2007, Livingstone reached an agreement that Chávez's government would supply £16 million a year worth of free oil to TfL, who would use it to subsidise half priced bus fares for 250,000 Londoners on benefits. In return, London would provide Venezuela with expertise in running transport, CCTV and waste management.

In May 2007, Livingstone travelled to New York City to attend the C40 conference of major world cities to deal with environmentalist issues. There, he called for other cities to adopt congestion charging as an environmental measure. In June 2007, he criticised the planned £200 million Thames Water Desalination Plant at Beckton, which would be the United Kingdom's first, calling it "misguided and a retrograde step in UK environmental policy", and that "we should be encouraging people to use less water, not more." In October 2007, London Councils stated Livingstone had gone back on his promise to chair the developing London Waste and Recycling Board, and to provide £6 million of funding for the project, because "the government had failed to provide him with absolute control of the Board."

==== Community cohesion and terrorism ====
Livingstone's emotional apology for London's role in the transatlantic slave trade

Amid the War on Terror, Livingstone sought to improve ties with London Muslims, meeting with both moderate and Islamist groups like the Muslim Association of Britain. At a July 2004 conference he spoke at a conference alongside Islamist cleric Yusuf al-Qaradawi, which drew criticism from Jewish and LGBT organisations who cited al-Qaradawi's history of antisemitic and homophobic remarks.

In July 2005, Salafi jihadi suicide bombers undertook attacks that killed 52 civilians across London. Livingstone, then in Singapore, returned to the city immediately. Informing the BBC that Western foreign policy was largely to blame for the attacks, his response to the situation was widely praised, even by opponents. Fearing an Islamophobic backlash against London's Muslims, he launched an advertising campaign against division and an inter-communal rally in Trafalgar Square. A second, failed suicide bombing attack took place later that month, and in the aftermath police mistakenly killed a Brazilian tourist; amid the ensuing controversy, Livingstone defended the actions of Metropolitan Police commissioner Ian Blair.

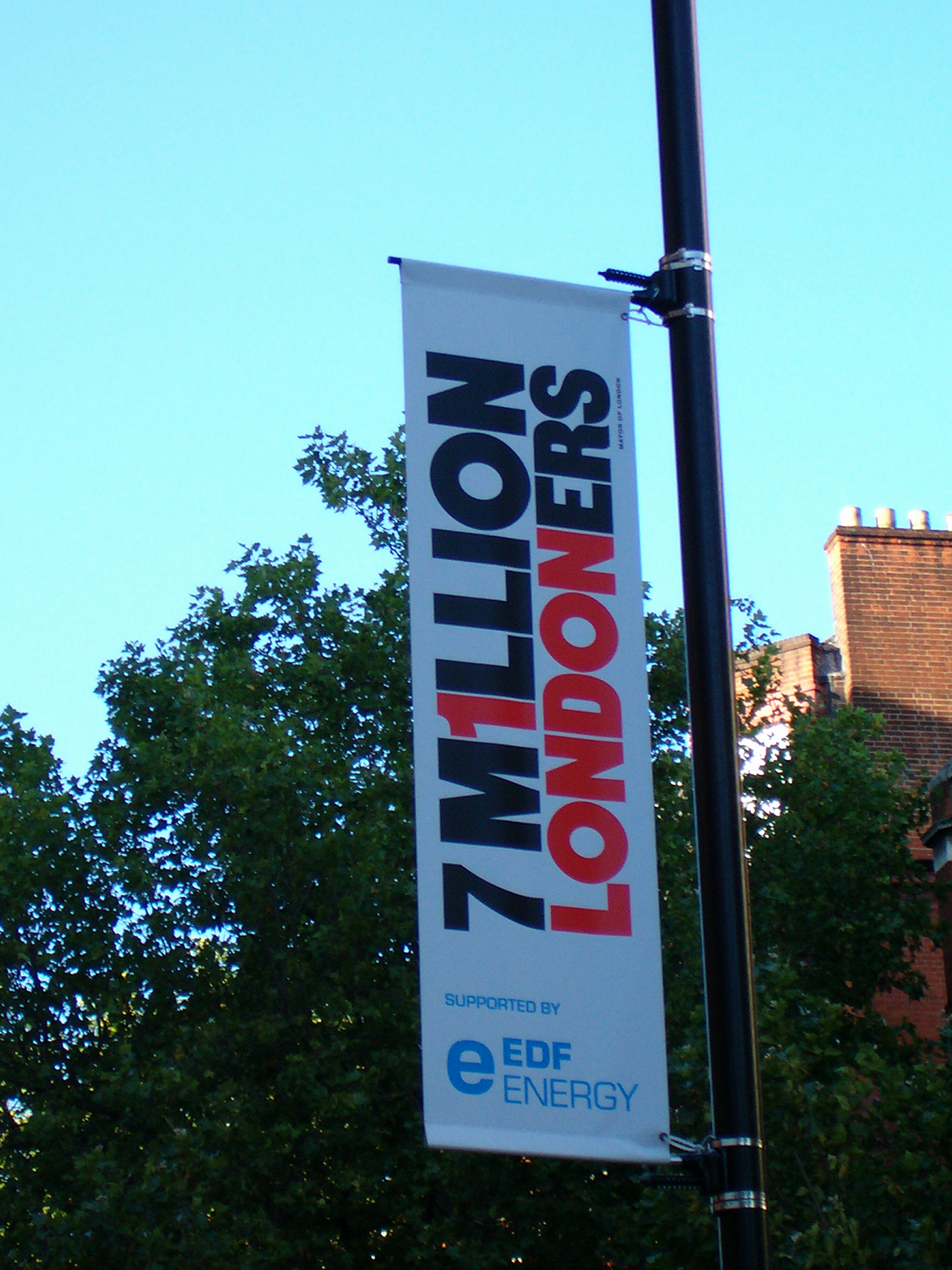
In the aftermath of the 2005 London bombings, Livingstone initiated a campaign to celebrate London's multiculturalism

In August 2007, he issued a public apology on behalf of London for its role in the Atlantic slave trade. A week later he attended the unveiling of the statue of Nelson Mandela in Parliament Square, where he met with Nelson Mandela.

==== Antisemitism controversies ====
Livingstone's second term saw repeated accusations of antisemitism. In February 2005, Livingstone argued with the Evening Standard journalist Oliver Finegold, calling him "a German war criminal". When Finegold objected, saying that he was Jewish, Livingstone added that he was "just like a concentration camp guard," one who worked for the "reactionary bigots... who supported fascism" at the Daily Mail. The Board of Deputies of British Jews accused Livingstone of antisemitism over the incident. Holocaust survivor groups, the London Assembly, and Blair called for Livingstone to apologise, but he refused. The Standards Board for England asked the Adjudication Panel to investigate; in February 2006 they found him guilty of bringing his office into disrepute and suspended him from the mayoralty for a month. Livingstone argued that an unelected board should not have the power to suspend an elected official, and in October the High Court judge Andrew Collins overturned the suspension. Livingstone continued to promote Palestinian causes, in March 2005 accusing Israeli prime minister Ariel Sharon of being a "war criminal" responsible for the 1982 Sabra and Shatila massacre.

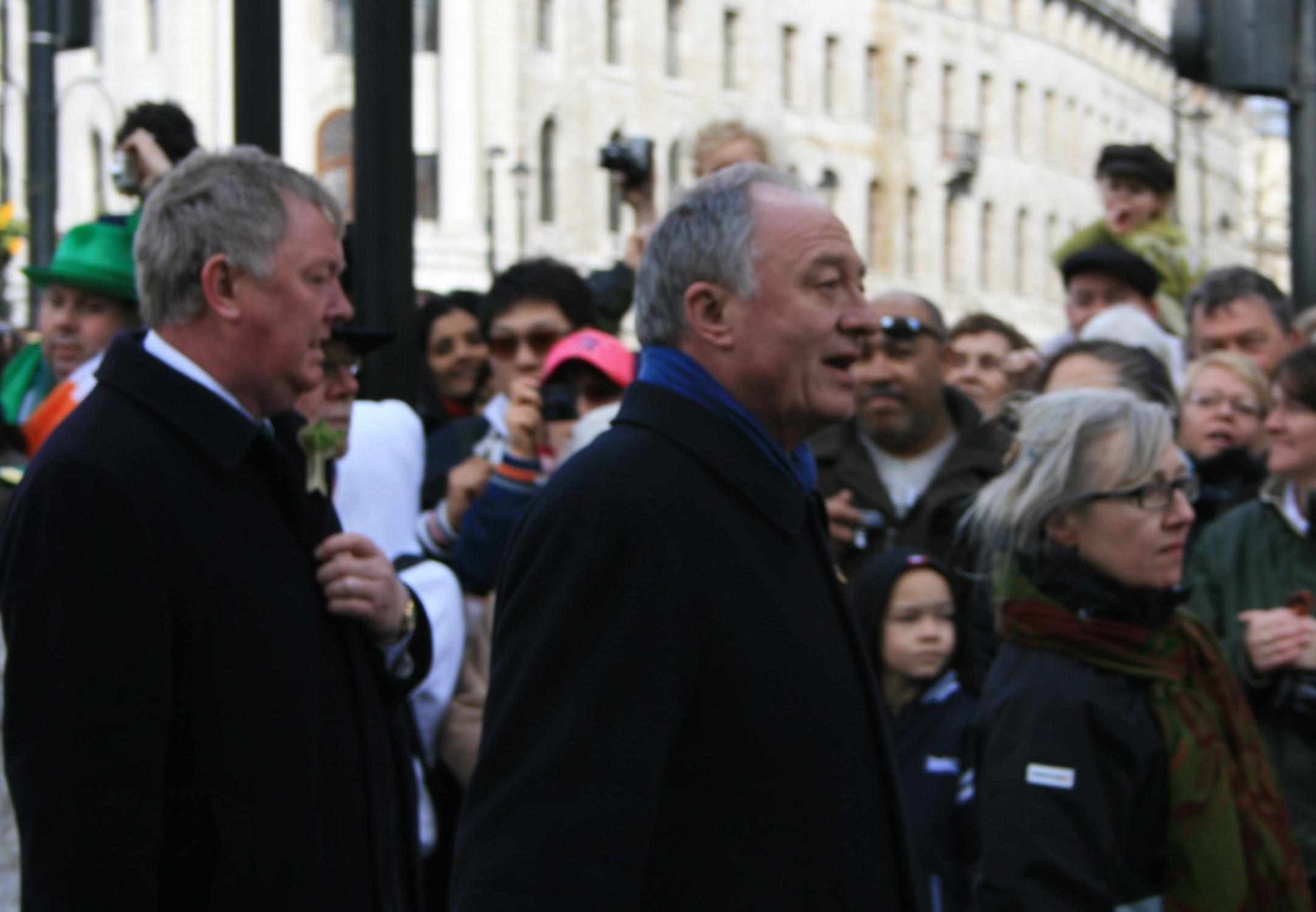
Livingstone attends the 2007 St Patrick's Day celebrations in London.

Livingstone denied he was antisemitic, holding regular meetings with Jewish groups and introducing public Hanukkah celebrations in Trafalgar Square in December 2005. He was again described as antisemitic in March 2006 for asserting, after conflict over a major building project, that Indian-born Jewish businessmen David and Simon Reuben should "go back to Iran and see if they can do better under the ayatollahs". He said later that he did not know they were Jewish. He refused to apologise to the Reubens at the time, instead offering "a complete apology to the people of Iran for the suggestion that they may be linked in any way to the Reuben brothers". The GLA rejected the accusation of misconduct against Livingstone over the incident in June 2006, but he did make a general apology for causing offence to Jews in previous years in December that year.

==== 2008 mayoral election ====
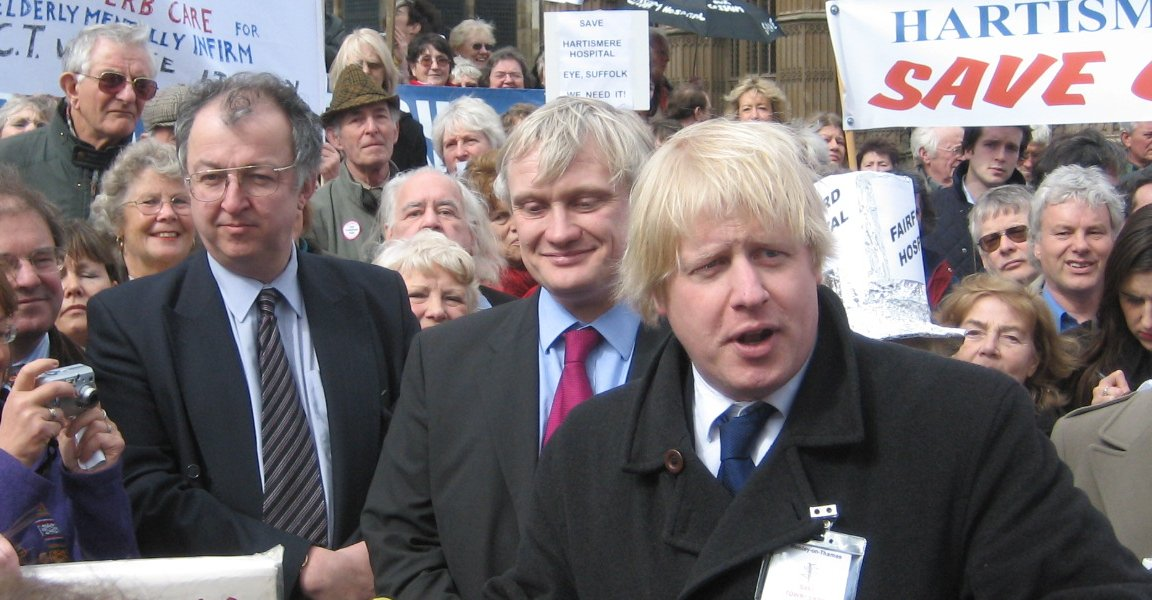
Livingstone was defeated by Conservative candidate Boris Johnson (pictured right, 2006) at the 2008 London mayoral election

Livingstone stood as Labour's candidate in the 2008 London mayoral election, this time against Conservative candidate Boris Johnson. Livingstone took Johnson's threat seriously, calling him "the most formidable opponent I will face in my political career." Livingstone's campaign accused Johnson of making racist and homophobic comments; it also proposed that in a third term Livingstone would increase the congestion charge for the most polluting vehicles while removing it for the least. The Livingstone campaign also emphasised falling crime rates and growing numbers of Metropolitan Police officers under his tenure, although Johnson's campaign highlighted a rise in gang killings to promote the claim it would be tougher on youth crime and anti-social behaviour.

In December 2007 when Evening Standard journalist Andrew Gilligan alleged that one of Livingstone's close advisers, Lee Jasper, had used at least £2.5 million from the London Development Agency to fund black community groups associated with him. Livingstone stood by Jasper and claimed that the Evening Standard campaign was racist, but ultimately agreed to suspend Jasper while a full investigation took place. An independent report into the affair by district auditor Michael Haworth-Maden in July 2009 found no evidence of "misappropriation of funds" but noted "significant" gaps in financial paperwork. At the May 2008 election, Johnson won 53.2% of first and second-preference votes to Livingstone's 46.8%.

== Post-mayoral career ==
=== During Boris Johnson's mayoralty: 2008–2016 ===
"Obviously everyone respects the decision of the electorate. But it is already clear that Boris Johnson's Tory regime is one of decline [in] London: economic decline, social decline, cultural decline and environmental decline. This is the real root of the incompetence [his administration] has shown in its first two months in office. I believe this will become increasingly obvious and therefore I will use the normal methods of democratic debate to convince electors that the previous policies were successful and the new ones will fail."

— Ken Livingstone (2008)

Although Johnson paid tribute to Livingstone's "very considerable achievements", his administration reversed several of Livingstone's policies, including overturning the Venezuelan oil deal. Intent on giving Venezuela the "advice that we promised", Livingstone in August 2008 pledged to be advising urban planning in Caracas. Livingstone predicted that in twenty years it could become a "first-world city", and hoped to help with his "very extensive network of contacts both domestically and internationally".

In January 2009, Livingstone responded to the Gaza War by calling for the European Union and the UK to recall their ambassadors to Israel. From September 2009 to March 2011, he presented the book review programme Epilogue for the Iranian state-sponsored international news channel Press TV, for which he was criticised by Iranian exile groups. In July 2010, he spoke at the Durham Miners' Gala, using the speech to condemn spending cuts by David Cameron's coalition government. In May 2011, Livingstone criticised the U.S. killing of Al-Qaeda leader Osama bin Laden, suggesting he should instead have been put on trial.

Livingstone stood as Labour's candidate for the 2012 London mayoral election, again challenging Johnson. His campaign attracted criticism when he joked that the election was "a simple choice between good and evil". It again caused controversy when Livingstone was accused of antisemitism by Jewish Labour supporters after suggesting that, being largely wealthy, London's Jewish community would not vote for him. He denied making the comments, but nevertheless apologised. Johnson's campaign accused Livingstone of tax evasion, for which Livingstone called Johnson a "bare-faced liar". Johnson won the election with 1,054,811 votes to Livingstone's 992,273. Criticising media bias against him, Livingstone retired from politics. Political scientist Andrew Cranes suggested that, after decades in the public eye, London's electorate had come to see Livingstone as an over-familiar and politically tired figure. In May 2015, Livingstone endorsed Sadiq Khan to be the Labour candidate for the 2016 London mayoral election.

=== Under Jeremy Corbyn's leadership: 2015–2022 ===
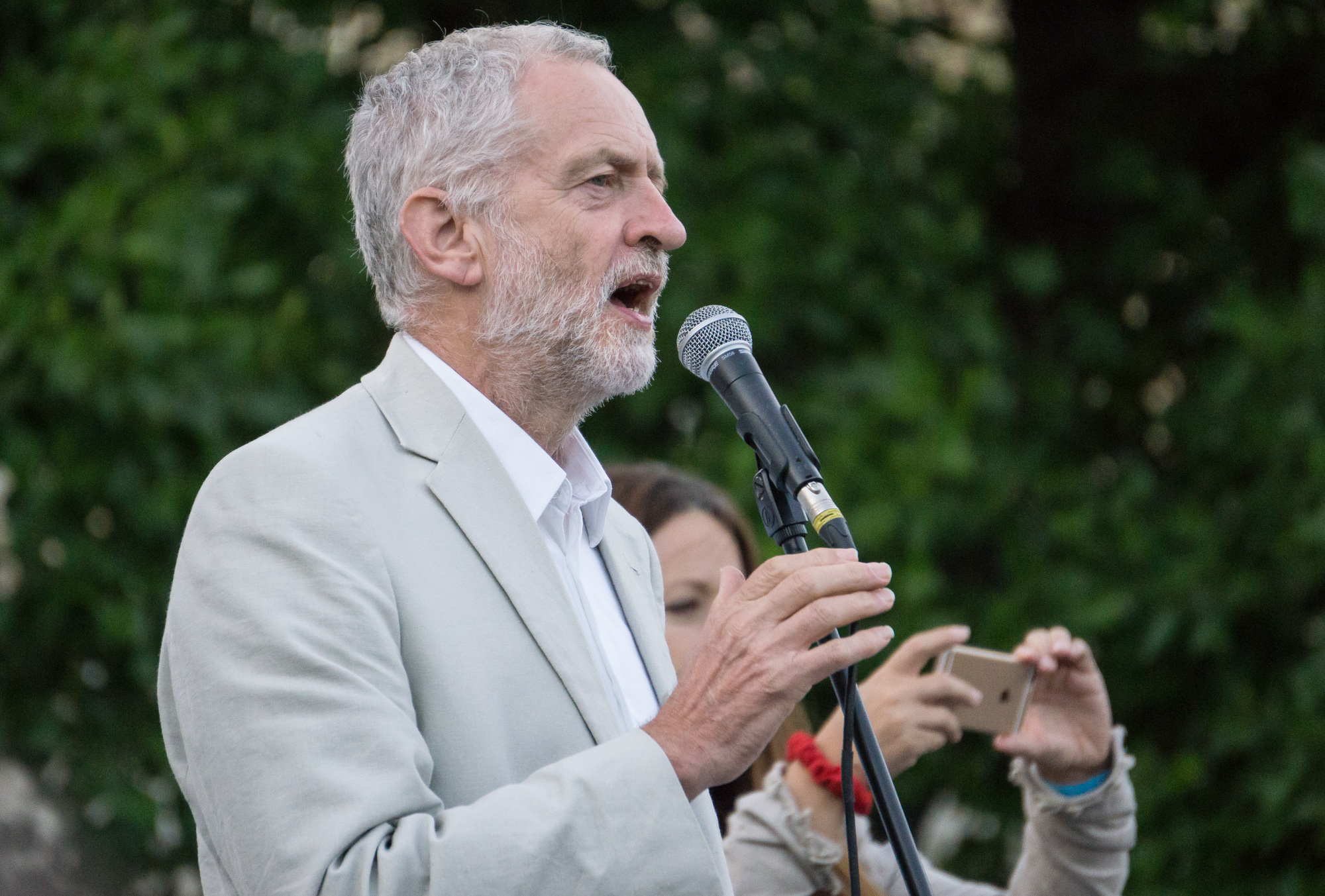
Livingstone supported Jeremy Corbyn's candidature as Labour leader.

Livingstone endorsed Jeremy Corbyn in the 2015 Labour leadership election. After Corbyn won, Livingstone became one of his most prominent allies; in November 2015, Corbyn appointed Livingstone to co-convene Labour's defence review alongside Maria Eagle. Shadow defence minister Kevan Jones warned that Livingstone knew little about defence; Livingstone's response that Jones, who suffered from clinical depression, needed "psychiatric help", brought criticism. Livingstone initially refused to apologise but subsequently did so at Corbyn's urging.

Livingstone faced further criticism following a television appearance in which he stated that the perpetrators of the 2005 London bombings carried out their actions as retribution for UK involvement in the Iraq War. In March 2016, Livingstone again courted controversy by comparing a hedge fund manager's £16,800 donation to Labour MP Dan Jarvis to "Jimmy Savile funding a children's group"; it subsequently emerged that Livingstone himself had received £8,000 from a Bermuda-based hedge fund for a speaking engagement, leading to accusations of hypocrisy. Livingstone insisted the two situations were different.

==== Suspension from the Labour Party ====
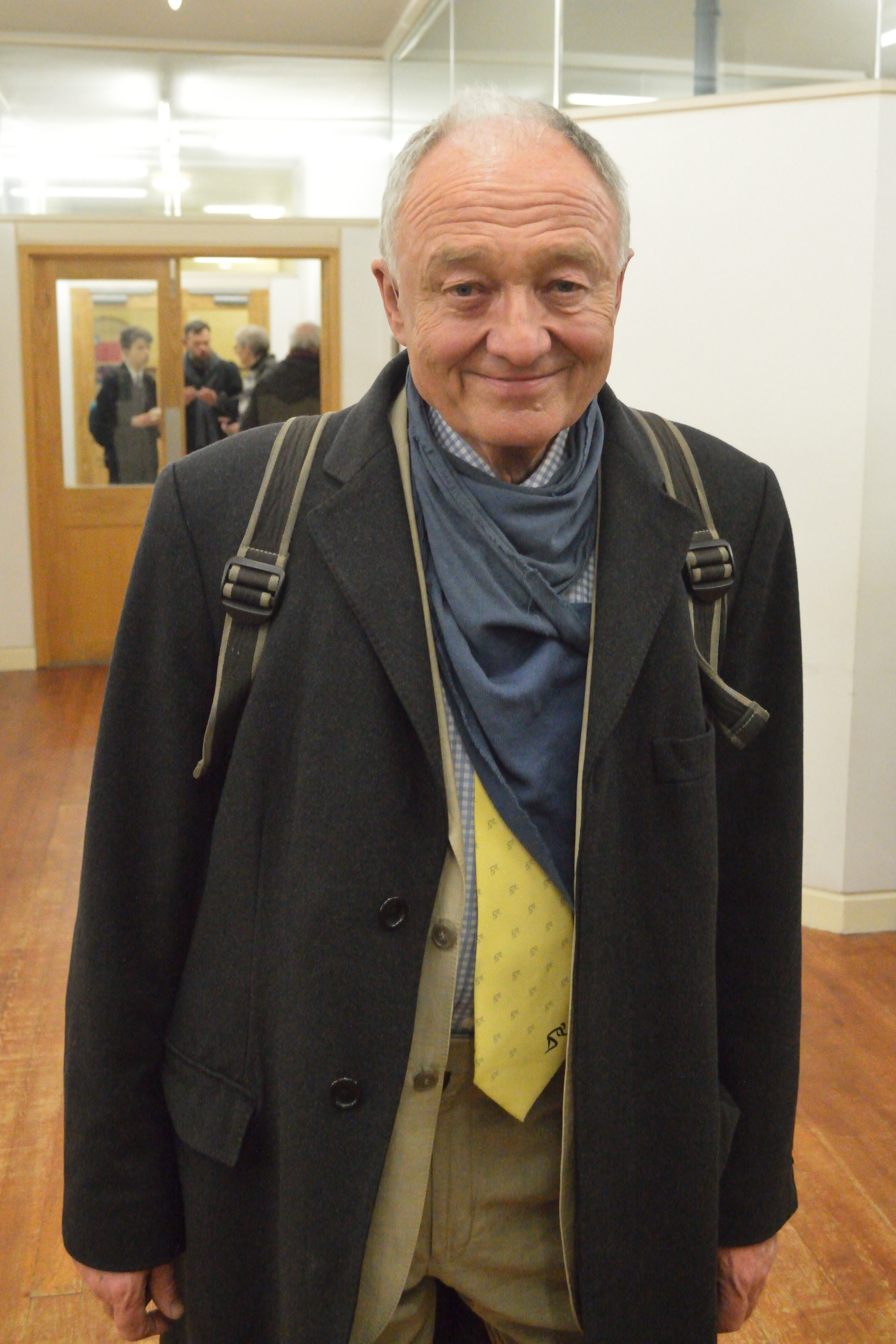
Livingstone after a Radio 4 Any Questions? programme in 2016

Livingstone was suspended from Labour in April 2016 after being accused of "bringing the party into disrepute" following a BBC Radio London interview in which he stated: "When Hitler won his election in 1932 his policy then was that Jews should be moved to Israel. He was supporting Zionism before he went mad and ended up killing six million Jews". Livingstone added that he had never encountered antisemitism in Labour.

Livingstone defended his statement about Hitler and Zionism by reference to Lenni Brenner's Zionism in the Age of the Dictators, and many commentators suggested that Livingstone was referring to the Haavara Agreement between Nazi Germany and the Zionist Federation of Germany. Livingstone's statements were criticised as inaccurate by historians like Timothy D. Snyder, Roger Moorhouse, and Andrew Roberts.

Over 20 Labour MPs called for Livingstone's suspension and newly elected Labour London mayor Sadiq Khan called for his expulsion. Jon Lansman, founder of the pro-Corbyn Momentum group, called for Livingstone to leave politics. Labour MP John Mann publicly confronted Livingstone and accused him of being a "liar" and a "Nazi apologist". In a subsequent interview, Livingstone expressed regret for mentioning Hitler and for offending Jews but refused to apologise. He stated that it was "absurd" to call him an antisemite because he had two Jewish girlfriends, and that he may have maternal Jewish ancestry. Livingstone said there was a "well-orchestrated campaign by the Israel lobby to smear anybody who criticises Israeli policy as antisemitic".

Corbyn stated that the decision whether to expel Livingstone would be made by a National Executive Committee (NEC) internal inquiry; Livingstone insisted he would be exonerated, saying "how can the truth be an offence?" In April 2017, Labour's National Constitutional Committee held that Livingstone had brought the party into disrepute, ordering his suspension be continued for another year. Labour's deputy leader Tom Watson declared it was "incomprehensible" that the NEC had not expelled Livingstone; Corbyn said he was disappointed Livingstone did not "acknowledge or apologise for the hurt he has caused". In March 2018 the NEC extended Livingstone's suspension indefinitely.

Livingstone resigned from Labour in May 2018, saying the issues surrounding his suspension had become a distraction and maintaining support for Corbyn's leadership. In April 2019, Labour Against the Witchhunt made him their honorary president. In October 2020, the Equality and Human Rights Commission published a report into Livingstone's comments, finding that they constituted unlawful harassment under the Equality Act 2010 and that Labour was legally responsible for the harassment because Livingstone, as an NEC member, was an agent of the party. The Commission also found that his disciplinary case had been subject to interference from the leaders' office.

=== Outside of the Labour Party: 2020–2022 ===
In January 2022, Livingstone stated his intention of joining the Green Party of England and Wales, although urged other socialists to remain within Labour and work towards "a Green-Labour coalition" government. The Greens rejected Livingstone's membership application. By September 2023, Livingstone had retired from public life, following a diagnosis of Alzheimer's disease.

== Political views ==
"Ken never had a very clear political philosophy. Ken never read philosophical books from a political point of view. He had a gut feeling; he was always opposed to exploitation and inequalities in a big way. He had a social conscience and wanted to do something about it. But he saw it within the existing parliamentary and political system. He didn't consider taking up arms against anybody as a way forward or dramatically changing the electoral system. He thought you could persuade and change the Labour Party."

— Ted Knight on Livingstone.

Within the Labour Party, Livingstone was aligned with the left wing. Historian Alwyn W. Turner commented that Livingstone's entire approach to politics revolved not simply around providing public services but in trying to change society itself; in his words, he wanted to get away from the concept of "old white men coming along to general management committees and talking about rubbish collection." Biographer John Carvel, a journalist from The Guardian, wrote that Livingstone's political motivation was a "fundamental desire ... for a more participative, cooperative society", leading him to oppose "concentrations of power and... exploitation in all its forms – economic, racial and sexual." About his approach to fiscal policy, Livingstone has said: "I was a monetarist right from the beginning when I was leader of the GLC. We paid down debt every year. We had an absolutely firm rule."

Livingstone addressing a gathering for Workers Memorial Day in 2005

Livingstone describes himself as a socialist. In 1987, he stated that "politics is my religion. It's my moral framework. I believe a socialist society is inherently the best thing, and that's like an act of faith." In 2007, he stated that "I still believe one day that the idea that the main means of production are owned by private individuals... will be considered as anti-democratic as the idea serfs could be tied to the land. But I will not be alive when that day comes." Livingstone had always worked towards a unified socialist front on the British left, and disliked the tendency towards splintering and forming rival factions, usually over issues of political theory, among the socialist community. Although rejecting Marxism, throughout his political career he has worked alongside Marxist far-left groups and has become involved with the "politics of the street". He has not worked with those Marxist groups, such as the Socialist Workers Party and the Revolutionary Communist Party, who advocate the destruction of the Labour Party as the way forward for socialism, seeing their beliefs as incompatible with his own. Livingstone has consistently opposed the actions of the Israeli government. In a 2005 interview, he said that he was not against the existence of Israel but rather Ariel Sharon's government; he recalled that on his 1986 visit to the country he got on well with its left-wing politicians.

Livingstone has consistently rejected being defined under any particular ideological current of socialism. Recognising this, the former Labour Party leader Neil Kinnock said in 2000 that Livingstone could only be defined as a Kennist. Livingstone's understanding of politics arises from his studies of non-human animal behaviour and anthropology; rejecting the idea that the human species is naturally progressing (a view advocated by socialists like the Fabian Society), Livingstone instead took the view that human society is still coming to terms with the massive socioeconomic changes that it experienced upon the development of agriculture during the Neolithic. Highlighting that a hunter-gatherer mode of subsistence is more natural to the human species, he believes that modern society has to adopt many hunter-gatherer values – namely cooperation and emphasis on human relationships rather than consumerism – in order to survive.

== Personal life ==
Historian Alwyn W. Turner noted that Livingstone was a "gifted communicator and self-publicist" who was able to stump his opponents using his "mischievous sense of humour". Biographer John Carvel echoed these comments, highlighting that Livingstone had a "talent for public speaking". Biographer Andrew Hosken noted that many of those who had worked with Livingstone had commented on him being an excellent boss, who was "a good delegator, decisive and supportive" as well as being "a friendly and modest colleague". Jenny McCartney, a reporter from The Spectator, expressed the view that "in person he is hard to dislike. There's a notable absence of pomposity in his manner, a propensity to laughter, and his love of an ideological scrap is allied to a calm, sometimes wry style of delivery: it looks fiercer on paper." In The Guardian, the journalist Hugh Muir described Livingstone as a man who is "happiest in the limelight, discomforted by the periphery" and who also "hates to apologise ... especially when called upon [to do so] ... by media or political opponents for whom he has no respect".

On the issue of nationality, Livingstone has expressed the view that he identifies as English rather than British, although his father was Scottish and he supports the continued existence of the United Kingdom. Although raised into a nominally Anglican family, Livingstone renounced religious belief when he was eleven, becoming an atheist. In a 2005 interview he commented that in doing so he had rejected "mumbo-jumbo in favour of rational science."

Livingstone is known for his enthusiasm for gardening and keeping and breeding newts. He was the first person to breed the western dwarf clawed frog Hymenochirus curtipes in captivity. Livingstone is a big fan of The Godfather film franchise, stating that the actions of the criminal organisations within the movies are very much akin to the world of politics.

=== Family ===
Livingstone repeatedly attempted to keep his family life private, commenting that "I expect that my private life is not in the public domain and I'm rude to any journalist who turns up... at home". It is known that he has five children. Livingstone married Christine Pamela Chapman in 1973; the marriage ended in divorce in 1982. Around that time he became involved with Kate Allen, who became director of Amnesty International's UK Section; the couple separated in November 2001. He then entered a relationship with his office manager, Emma Beal; they have a son (Thomas) and a daughter together. Livingstone and Beal married on 26 September 2009 in the Mappin Pavilion of London Zoo. They live in North London.

Livingstone had also fathered three children prior to 2000; a boy by one mother and two girls by another. The children were born to two women while Livingstone was involved with Kate Allen, according to an article by Decca Aitkenhead:

In his memoir, he describes how one was an old friend who was keen to have children but feared she was running out of time. "We had never been involved romantically but I knew her well enough to know she would be a wonderful mother and so I said I would like to be the father of her children." A daughter was born in 1990, and another in 1992. Then another friend said she'd like to have children: "And we agreed to have a baby." Their son was born within weeks of his daughter in 1992.

== Legacy and influence ==
Described in The Guardian as "a polarising and controversial figure", throughout his career, Livingstone has polarised public opinion. He was widely recognised as a risk-taker. In 2007, Charles Moore characterised him as "the only truly successful left-wing British politician of modern times". Supporters described him as the "People's Ken" and an "anti-politician politician", opining that he had the common touch with working-class Londoners that most British politicians lacked. He was widely recognised for having improved the status of minority groups in London. He was also deemed a "formidable operator" at City Hall, with an "intimate knowledge" of London. He was also criticised during his career. During his Mayorship, he faced repeated accusations of cronyism for favouring his chosen aides over other staff. One of his supporters, Atma Singh, commented that under Livingstone's leadership, a culture of bullying pervaded at City Hall, although this was denied by many other staff there.

During the 1980s, Spitting Image featured a fictionalised version of Livingstone voiced by Harry Enfield. In 1990, BBC show The Comic Strip produced an episode entitled "GLC: The Carnage Continues..." in which Robbie Coltrane gave a fictionalised portrayal of Charles Bronson playing Livingstone in a Hollywood movie. Kate Bush wrote the song "Ken" for the episode, which was then released as a B-side to her single "Love and Anger".

== Notes ==
Political offices
Preceded by Horace Cutler	Leader of the Greater London Council; 1981–1986	Position abolished
New office	Mayor of London; 2000–2008	Succeeded by Boris Johnson
Parliament of the United Kingdom
Preceded by Reg Freeson	Member of Parliament for Brent East; 1987–2001	Succeeded by Paul Daisley
Party political offices
Preceded by Andrew McIntosh	Leader of the Labour Party on the Greater London Council; 1981–1986	GLC abolished
