= Surcharge (sanction) =

Punishment for UK local government losses

Prior to 2000 a local government officer or councillor in the United Kingdom, who had unlawfully spent public funds, or caused loss to a local authority through misconduct could be surcharged to recover public money. The surcharge was applied, after referral to a court by the Audit Commission.

In the case of an illegal corporate decision by an elected body, all the councillors could be surcharged. Councillors from Lambeth London Borough Council and Liverpool City Council who were involved in the rate-capping rebellion in 1985 were surcharged. Councillors in the 1973 Clay Cross Urban District Council Housing Finance Act dispute were surcharged £685 (equivalent to £10464 today) for refusing to increase housing rent.

The Committee on Standards in Public Life recommended repealing surcharge because it was unfair for local government officers and councillors, and "bore no relation to people's ability to pay or their culpability". The Local Government Act 2000 amended the Audit Commission Act 1998 to remove the ability of the Audit Commission or Secretary or State to recover financial losses from individuals. Instead they would be subject to normal sanctions determined by the Standards Board and Adjudication Panel. Following the Tribunal Review such sanctions are now dealt with by the General Regulatory Chamber of the First-tier Tribunal.

== See also ==
- Disgorgement (law)
