= Public standards in the United Kingdom =

Public standards in the United Kingdom may refer to:

- Committee on Standards in Public Life
- Parliamentary Standards Authority
- Standards Board for England
- Standards Commission for Scotland
- Ethical Standards in Public Life etc. (Scotland) Act 2000

== See also ==
- International Public Sector Accounting Standards#United_Kingdom
