= Scottish Parliament Standards, Procedures and Public Appointments Committee =

The Creating Scottish Parliament Standards, Procedures and Public Appointments Committee is appointed by the Scottish Parliament to oversee the work of the Standards Commission for Scotland.

== History ==
A previous iteration of the committee was created in 1999 as implementation of schedule 6 the Northern Ireland Act 1998: "preventing conduct which would constitute a criminal offence or contempt of court" and a "a sub judice rule." A committee on standards and privileges was established under the standing orders of the Scottish Parliament.
