= Pensions Ombudsman =

Ombudsman for pensions in the United Kingdom

- The Pensions Ombudsman
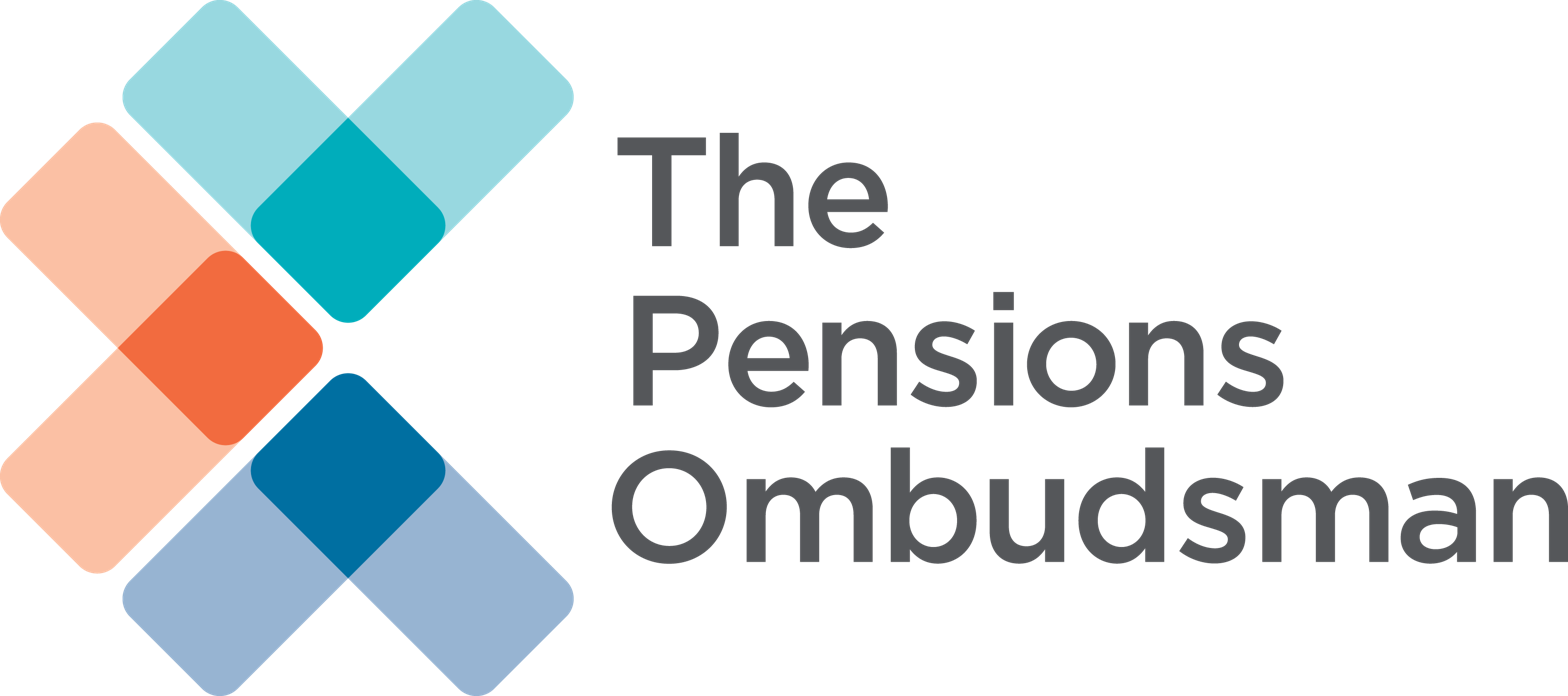
- Formation: 1991; 35 years ago
- Type: Non-departmental public body of the UK Government
- Headquarters: 10 South Colonnade, London, United Kingdom
- Pensions Ombudsman: Dominic Harris
- Key people: Deborah Evans (Chair); Robert Loughlin (COO)
- Employees: 141 (2022/23)
- Website: Official website

The Pensions Ombudsman is the official ombudsman institution responsible for investigating complaints regarding pensions in the United Kingdom. The Pensions Ombudsman is a non-departmental public body stewarded by the Department for Work and Pensions, and the Ombudsman and Deputy Ombudsman are appointed by the Secretary of State for Work and Pensions. The Ombudsman is an independent commissioner; he and his staff are not civil servants. His brief is to resolve disputes of fact or law and to investigate claims of maladministration. Unusually for UK Ombudsmen, the Pensions Ombudsman's determinations are binding on the parties and enforceable in the County Court. There is a right of appeal to the High Court on a point of law (Court of Session in Scotland and Court of Appeal in Northern Ireland). In England the High Court's permission has to be obtained for an appeal.

Although the first UK Ombudsman, the Parliamentary Commissioner for Administration, was established in 1967, followed by the Insurance Ombudsman and other private sector Ombudsman schemes, the first time the title Ombudsman was used by Parliament was to establish the office of Pensions Ombudsman in 1991.

== History ==
The first Pensions Ombudsman was Michael Platt, who had previously been a civil servant. He was succeeded by Dr. Julian Farrand QC(Hon), formerly the Insurance Ombudsman. Prior to his work as an Ombudsman, Dr Farrand had been a Law Commissioner and a university professor. He is married to Baroness Hale, also previously a Law Commissioner and the first woman to be a member of the Judicial Committee of the House of Lords, now the Supreme Court, the UK's highest court.

Dr Farrand was succeeded by David Laverick, a solicitor who was previously a Director of the Local Government Ombudsman service and chief executive of the Family Health Services Appeal Authority. He was also President of the Adjudication Panel for England, a body which dealt with allegations about the conduct of members of local authorities. Tony King was the Ombudsman from September 2007 to May 2015. Tony King was previously a Principal Ombudsman in the Financial Ombudsman Service.

The role of Deputy Pensions Ombudsman was created in December 2004. The first holder of the post was Charlie Gordon, a barrister and Senior Inspector of Taxes who was previously head of the Adjudicator's Office. Jane Irvine, previously Chair of the Scottish Legal Complaints Commission, held the post from November 2009 to May 2015. Jane Irvine was succeeded by Karen Johnston, a barrister who was previously Strategy Lawyer at the Pensions Regulator. On 1 July 2020 Claire Ryan, the existing Legal Director, was appointed Deputy Pensions Ombudsman.

In May 2015 Tony King was succeeded by Anthony Arter, a solicitor and former police officer who was Eversheds LLP London Senior Partner and Head of Pensions.

The Pensions Ombudsman, together with the Pensions Regulator. the Pensions Advisory Service and the Pensions Registry, are funded by a levy on occupational pension schemes. The Ombudsman's services are free to complainants and respondents, and the Ombudsman's jurisdiction extends to many pension arrangements that are not subject to the levy.

Since April 2005, the holder of the office of Pensions Ombudsman has also acted as the Ombudsman for the Pension Protection Fund, and in that capacity also deals with appeals against decisions made by the Financial Assistance Scheme, established by the Government to provide assistance to those whose pensions have been lost due to an employer going into liquidation.

As with other ombudsmen services, the Pensions Ombudsman has been accused of both being biased towards complainants and being biased towards the companies that pay the levy. However, the levy is a statutory requirement which pension schemes have to pay anyway. There have also been criticisms of the appeal process, which involves the cost of action in the higher courts, and the legalistic approach to casework. The Pensions Ombudsman's claim that it is a 'court' for certain purposes has been disputed.
