= Prejudicial interest =

Local government term

In Welsh local authority politics, the term prejudicial interest is used to describe a particular type of conflict of interest involving councillors. When a councillor has an interest in a topic under debate which may prejudice their ability to fairly and objectively consider the subject, he or she is said to have a prejudicial interest. An example would be a councillor discussing a planning application for a company in which he or she has an interest. The councillor has an interest in the plans being considered and is therefore considered to have a "prejudicial interest". Under a statutory Model Code of Conduct, it is the responsibility of Welsh councillors to declare certain interests prior to discussions, and if prejudicial interests are declared, they must leave the room until the matter in which they have an interest has been decided. The regulatory authority is the Standards Board for Wales and the Public Services Ombudsman for Wales carries out investigations. Anyone can make an allegation of an undeclared prejudicial interest, but this can only be investigated after the event.

Until abolished in 2012, there was a similar system in England, where the Standards Board for England was the body responsible for investigating allegations of breaches of the statutory Model Code of Conduct. This was abolished in England by the Localism Act 2011. With effect from 2012, this system was replaced by a new criminal offence of failing to declare Disclosable Pecuniary Interests.

In Scotland, the Standards Commission for Scotland carries out a similar function but also regulates members of devolved bodies.
