= Overview and Scrutiny =

Function of local authorities in England and Wales

Overview and Scrutiny is a function of local authorities in England and Wales. It was introduced by the Local Government Act 2000 which created separate Executive and Overview and Scrutiny functions within councils.

Councils operating executive arrangements are required to create an Overview and Scrutiny Committee which is composed of councillors who are not on the executive committee, or Cabinet, of that council. Overview and Scrutiny Committees are required to meet the rules on proportionality defined in the Local Government And Housing Act 1989 (i.e. the committee must reflect the respective sizes of the political groups on the council). Councils in England which use the committee system are not required to establish an overview and scrutiny committee, but may do so if they wish.

There is no national standard or prescription on the committee structure that councils adopt to satisfy these legislative requirements. A wide variety of designations and structures are in use, ranging from single committees to multiple committees with sub-committees. Structures have no significant impact on the overall effectiveness of the scrutiny function in individual authorities.

The law relating to overview and scrutiny is slightly different in England, Wales and Northern Ireland. In Scotland, councils all operate under the committee system, and they conduct internal scrutiny of their own activities through an audit or scrutiny committee, whose role is to examine the performance and management of risk within the council. Scottish rules allow that in some cases these committees are led by someone who is not a councillor, or by member of the opposition.

== Overview and Scrutiny in England ==
Scrutiny may, under the Local Government Act 2000 (as amended in 2011), investigate any issue which "affects the area or the area's inhabitants".

=== Summary of powers and responsibilities ===
In England, overview and scrutiny committees may:

- require information that is held by the council (with councillors sitting on overview and scrutiny committees having particular rights to access certain information - for example, information that might be commercially confidential),
- require attendance at committee meetings by Cabinet members and council officers,
- require from Cabinet responses to recommendations made by scrutiny committees.

Scrutiny committees also have powers in relation to certain other partner organisations - in particular local NHS bodies and community safety partnerships. Such bodies are under various obligations to respond or have regard to these recommendations. Scrutiny holds general powers of oversight on flood risk management although detailed regulations relating to such matters have now expired.

By law, Overview and Scrutiny must have the right to 'call-in' decisions – i.e. ask the decision-maker to think again, or to refer the decision to the full council if it is believed that the decision-maker has taken a decision in contravention of the council's budget or policy framework. To be called in, decisions usually need to be "key decisions".

There is usually a window of five working days between the notification of the decision (when it is placed on public deposit) when a call-in can be requested. Again, this varies from authority to authority.

=== Scrutiny in combined authorities ===
Combined authorities must have overview and scrutiny committees as part of the governance scheme agreed by Government and confirmed by way of each authority's bespoke Order. The powers of combined authority overview and scrutiny committees are broadly analogous to those of local authorities but the strategic nature of business in combined authorities means that, in order to be effective, scrutiny needs to look quite different. Some combined authority scrutiny committees have struggled with quoracy (having enough members present for the meeting to formally transact business).

=== Statutory guidance and the importance of culture ===
In 2017 the House of Commons Communities and Local Government Select Committee conducted on inquiry into local government scrutiny. In response to this inquiry Government committed to the production of refreshed guidance to local authorities and combined authorities on overview and scrutiny, which was published in May 2019. This guidance focused on the importance of culture, and the attitude and mindset of those in executive and other leadership positions, in ensuring scrutiny's overall effectiveness. The importance of organisational and political culture to effective overview and scrutiny has also been highlighted by the Centre for Governance and Scrutiny.

== Overview and scrutiny in Wales ==
The Local Government (Wales) Measure sets out governance requirements for Welsh authorities. Welsh councils must operate executive arrangements and therefore must have overview and scrutiny committees. The powers of those committees are similar to those in England, although there are some differences, particularly in respect of powers over partners (termed as "designated persons").

The Well-being of Future Generations (Wales) Act 2015 means that public bodies are having to think differently about the long-term sustainability of the design and delivery of services: this in turn has implications for the planning and prioritisation of scrutiny work. A Future Generations Framework for Scrutiny has been produced to support this.

The Wales Audit Office has carried out sustained work to support the improvement of scrutiny in Welsh local authorities. Audit work in the 22 Welsh local authorities in 2017/18 led to the production in 2019 of a checklist to guide improvement.

== Overview and scrutiny in Northern Ireland ==
The Local Government (Northern Ireland) Act 2014 allowed new councils to choose between a number of governance options, one of which involves an executive/scrutiny split. Powers for these committees broadly reflect the powers of overview and scrutiny committees in England and Wales. As of 2020 no Northern Ireland council has chosen to adopt a governance model which incorporates overview and scrutiny.

== Scrutiny in Scotland ==
Councils in Scotland conduct internal scrutiny of their own activities through an audit or scrutiny committee, whose role is to examine the performance and management of risk within the council. Scottish rules allow that in some cases these committees are led by someone who is not a councillor, or by member of the opposition.

== General issues ==
Some themes are common to all jurisdictions where overview and scrutiny systems operate.

=== Culture, and parity of esteem ===
Research on scrutiny at a national level (principally in the UK Parliament) has highlighted 'parity of esteem' as an important component for scrutiny to be effective. This is replicated at a local level. Different councils can rely on a very different quality and level of support from their respective leaderships; the fact that scrutiny is dependent for resourcing on decision's made by the authority's administration leaves it particularly exposed where this positive culture of scrutiny does not exist. An effective culture of support for scrutiny is a necessary prerequisite for overall effectiveness.

=== Pre-decision scrutiny/in-year monitoring ===
Many councils have a procedure for inspection of proposals by members on Overview and Scrutiny committees before the Executive brings final proposals to council, a process known as "pre-decision scrutiny". This may happen a few weeks before a decision comes to be decided by Cabinet, or months earlier where an issue is being considered more fundamentally and options are being developed.

Scrutiny often has a role in in-year performance and finance monitoring, which it undertakes alongside the audit function of the authority.

=== Policy development and review ===
Overview and Scrutiny Committees in many councils undertake in-depth reviews of particular issues of relevance to local people.

This work is carried out in order to influence the council's Cabinet, and other local partners. Work like this is usually carried out in informal "task and finish" groups. These look at topics defined by a formal committee on the basis of that committee's work programme, gathering evidence from a range of internal and external witnesses (including the public) before reporting back to the commissioning committee, and ultimately the council's Cabinet, with formal recommendations. The Cabinet is under a duty to respond to recommendations made by scrutiny committees. A number of external partners must "have regard to" such recommendations.

Task and finish groups can take place over many months, or they can be much shorter. Some councils choose to conduct significant amounts of policy development work 'in committee', and/or at one-off meetings.

Scrutiny work which aims to develop and review policy tends to constitute the bulk of work considered most effective.

=== Public service reform and the partnership dynamic ===
Common to both the English and Welsh jurisdictions, particularly since 2010, has been the acceleration in the development of formal and informal partnership working at local level.

This has led to a more outward-looking approach to scrutiny work, with councillors looking at issues as they affect local people rather than carrying out oversight of the council as an institution. The potential expansion of scrutiny's role has led to some challenges in prioritisation, and the management of resources, to ensure that the function is investigating the right issues at the right time, and in the right way.

As councils have changed their operating models, scrutiny has also had to change its way of working - this might involve greater use of commissioning, or conversely more effective commercialisation of council operated services.

== Criticisms and shortcomings ==
There have been numerous criticisms of overview and scrutiny since its inception. Former Secretary of State John Denham described it in 2009 as "the lion that has failed to roar". In 2017, the Communities and Local Government Select Committee reported that there was room for improvement in "too many" local authorities.

The Francis inquiry into the Stafford Hospital scandal revealed that concerns expressed to the local scrutiny committee with responsibility for health issues had not been taken up and investigated. The inquiry report suggested that scrutiny needed to be properly supported to carry out a central role in a more robust accountability framework within the NHS, to prevent those events recurring.

Scrutiny is not well resourced in a number of councils. It relies on the council's Cabinet for its budget (there is no independent funding mechanism). The presence of the Democratic Services Committee, and the Head of Democratic Services as a statutory role, in Welsh authorities, affords some protection, as does the presence of the statutory scrutiny officer in upper tier and unitary English authorities.

== Support ==
=== Local support ===
Scrutiny committees are assisted by council employees (officers), often called "scrutiny officers". These officers are generally tasked with providing policy and research support to councillors. Sometimes they are also responsible for organising and administering meetings. The average number of scrutiny officers per council has been steadily declining since 2010 although this does not correlate with a decline in scrutiny's overall effectiveness.

=== National support ===
The Local Government Association provides a grant to the Centre for Governance and Scrutiny to provide advice, guidance and support to local authorities around scrutiny and good governance.

== See also ==
- Local government in the United Kingdom
- Elected mayors in the United Kingdom
