= Adjudication Panel for England =

Defunct British judicial tribunal

The Adjudication Panel for England was an independent judicial tribunal set up under the Local Government Act 2000. Its role was to rule on alleged breaches of English local authorities' codes of conduct by elected members of those authorities.

== History and function ==
The Panel was a non-departmental public body which ruled on complaints referred to it by the Standards Board for England. It was able to impose a range of penalties, ranging from a reprimand to disqualification from holding elected office for up to five years.

The Chair of the Panel was David Laverick.

The Panel was abolished in January 2010 and its functions transferred to the First-tier Tribunal. At the time of the transfer, the President of the Adjudication Panel for England was appointed as a Principal Judge of the First-tier Tribunal, its legal members became tribunal Judges and its lay members became tribunal members.

== Controversial cases ==
=== Ken Livingstone ===
The Adjudication Panel came to prominence in February 2006 when it suspended Mayor of London Ken Livingstone from office for four weeks following comments he made to Evening Standard journalist Oliver Finegold, which Finegold taped. The suspension attracted criticism from the media, and from across the political spectrum including former mayoral candidates Steve Norris (Conservative) and Simon Hughes (Lib Dem) and was subject to a critical motion in the London Assembly proposed by Damian Hockney (One London) and seconded by Darren Johnson (Green). The suspension was due to start on 1 March 2006, but the High Court stayed the suspension on 28 February, pending an appeal by Livingstone. The appeal hearing started on 4 October and on October 19 the judge, Mr Justice Collins, overturned the Panel's decision and said that it had misdirected itself. The suspension was quashed and full costs were awarded to Ken Livingstone.

=== Paul Dimoldenberg ===
In May 2005, the Panel found City of Westminster councillor Paul Dimoldenberg had breached the Council's code of conduct by leaking documents relating to Dame Shirley Porter, but imposed no penalty as Cllr Dimoldenberg was acting as a whistleblower and had not gained personally financially or politically.

=== Islington ===
In January 2006, the Panel cleared five councillors from the London Borough of Islington from allegations of conspiracy concerning the appointment of the Council's Chief Executive. The case, which concerned incidents from 2002, ran for over three years and was the longest-running case in the Panel's history.

== See also ==
- Prejudicial interest
- Standards Board for England
