= Local Government Act 2000 =

Act of the Parliament of the United Kingdom reforming local government

Local Government Act 2000 (Note: Section 109(1).)
- Act of Parliament
- Parliament of the United Kingdom
- Long title: An Act to make provision with respect to the functions and procedures of local authorities and provision with respect to local authority elections; to make provision with respect to grants and housing benefit in respect of certain welfare services; to amend section 29 of the Children Act 1989; and for connected purposes.
- Citation: 2000 c. 22
- Introduced by: Hilary Armstrong (Commons); Baroness Farrington of Ribbleton (Lords)
- Territorial extent: England and Wales; Scotland (in part); Northern Ireland (in part); (Note: Section 109(2)–(4).)

Dates
- Royal assent: 28 July 2000
- Commencement: Various (Note: Section 108.)
Other legislation
Amends	Social Security Contributions and Benefits Act 1992; Tribunals and Inquiries Act 1992
Amended by	Adoption and Children Act 2002; National Health Service (Consequential Provisions) Act 2006; Cities and Local Government Devolution Act 2016; Policing and Crime Act 2017; Wales Act 2017; Elections Act 2022; English Devolution and Community Empowerment Act 2026

Status: Amended

Text of statute as originally enacted

Revised text of statute as amended

The Local Government Act 2000 (c. 22) is an act of the Parliament of the United Kingdom that reformed local government in England and Wales.

== Provisions ==
Its principal purposes are:

- to give powers to local authorities to promote economic, social and environmental well-being within their boundaries
- to require local authorities to shift from their traditional committee-based system of decision-making to an executive model, possibly with a directly elected mayor (subject to approval by referendum), and with a cabinet of ruling party group members
- to create a consequent separation of functions with local authorities, with backbench councillors fulfilling an overview and scrutiny role
- to introduce a revised ethical framework for local authorities, requiring the adoption of codes of conduct for elected members and standards committees to implement the codes of conduct; the introduction of a national Standards Board and Adjudication Panel to deal with complaints and to oversee disciplinary issues
- to require each local authority to produce a publicly available constitution
- to introduce a wellbeing duty on local authorities

=== Directly elected mayors ===
The introduction of directly elected mayors (leaders) was the most radical innovation in the act. As of 2026, 55 referendums have been held, 16 of which have agreed with so resulted in an elected mayor (directly elected leader) option. The role of all other mayors is a charitable councillor, somewhat as a figurehead, in ceremonial occasions wearing the civic regalia and sometimes as chairman of events, usually co-opted to serve outside of their duties as councillor for one year only, the most powerful example of which is the Lord Mayor of London. Directly elected mayors resemble the old borough mayors of Great Britain, before reform by corporations and legislation, and some European equivalent empowered figures.

=== Options for council executive forms ===
The act, as amended, stipulates that the executive of a local authority must take one of the following forms:

- Leader and cabinet executive
- Mayor and cabinet executive
- Alternative arrangement (Section 31) (referred to as a Section 31 arrangement, most commonly seen in coalitions of political parties)

A mayor and council manager (fourth) option was repealed by the Local Government and Public Involvement in Health Act 2007. The only council which had made use of the mayor and council manager system was Stoke-on-Trent City Council.

Changes made by the Localism Act 2011 made it possible for larger authorities (more than 85,000 population) to adopt a committee system of governance.

=== Wellbeing duty and general power of competence ===
Originally, under the 2000 act, councils became equipped with the obligation to promote the wellbeing of the population in their area. This was replaced with a general power of competence by the Localism Act 2011.
