= David Stimpson =

British Labour Party politician

David Stimpson (born 3 September 1940 - ) was a British Labour Party politician, who was on the right of the party. First elected to Metropolitan Borough of Wandsworth 1962. Vice-chairman Public Health Committee. Elected to London Borough Of Lambeth 1964–1968, Chairman of Welfare Committee. Alderman Lambeth 1971–78, Chairman Management Services Committee 1972–73, Leader 1973–78. Councillor 1978–1982. Held a number of posts at ward and constituency level in Labour Party.

He left the Labour Party in 1981, joining the SDP and later the Liberal Democrats.

He also served as a school and college governor as well as the treasurer and churchwarden of St Peter's Church, Streatham.
