= Standards Commission for Scotland =

Scottish government agency

The Standards Commission for Scotland is an independent body that has the purpose of advancing high ethical standards in public life. Its main tool is the promotion and enforcement of Codes of Conduct for councillors (approved by the Scottish Parliament) and those appointed to devolved public bodies.

The Standards Commission is concerned with ethical conduct. It deals with complaints of misconduct against individual members. It does not deal with issues of maladministration; these are matters for the Scottish Public Services Ombudsman.

The Commission was established under the Ethical Standards in Public Life etc. (Scotland) Act 2000. The Commission Members are appointed by the Scottish Parliament but are expected to be independent of government in its workings. The current convener is Suzanne Vestri.

== Codes of Conduct ==
The Commission provide guidance and training on the application of the Codes to assist in promoting high standards of conduct.

The Commission publishes a Code of Conduct for Councillors, which sets out the standards of behaviour expected of councillors in Scotland. The first version came into force in May 2003. The most recent version came into force on 21 December 2015. Local authorities are encouraged also to establish their own codes of conduct (consistent with the Standards Commission's) and to enforce these codes themselves.

There is a model code of conduct produced for members of devolved bodies.

== Commission membership ==
The Commission comprises a Convener and four Commission Members who are appointed by the Scottish Parliament. Suzanne Vestri is the current Convener, taking up the position on 7 May 2024.

== The Commissioner for Ethical Standards in Public Life in Scotland ==
In addition to the Commission, the Ethical Standards in Public Life etc. (Scotland) Act 2000 established the office of the Commissioner for Ethical Standards in Public Life in Scotland (formerly known as the Chief Investigating Officer). The Commissioner is not a part of the Commission but has a duty to investigate complaints of misconduct referred to him. He is not entirely independent though; he must comply with any directions given by the Commission, which may not however direct him as to how to carry any particular investigation out.

== Public Bodies under the Standards Commission's Supervision ==
The Commission has authority over:

32 local authorities and 105 other public bodies. Community councils are not under this authority.

The Devolved Public Bodies over which the Commission has authority are:

- The Accounts Commission for Scotland
- The Crofters Commission
- The Deer Commission for Scotland
- Highlands and Islands Enterprise
- The Parole Board for Scotland
- Scottish Agricultural Wages Board
- The Scottish Conveyancing and Executry Services Board
- The Scottish Criminal Cases Review Commission
- The Scottish Environment Protection Agency
- Scottish Enterprise
- The Royal Commission on the Ancient and Historical Monuments of Scotland
- The National Galleries of Scotland Board of Trustees
- The Royal Botanic Garden, Edinburgh Board of Trustees
- The Scottish Arts Council
- Scottish Natural Heritage
- The Trustees of the National Library of Scotland
- The National Museums of Scotland Board of Trustees
- The Scottish Tourist Board
- Area tourist boards
- 41 Colleges of further education
- The Scottish Further Education Funding Council
- The Scottish Higher Education Funding Council
- The Scottish Qualifications Authority
- The Clinical Standards Board for Scotland
- The NHS National Services Scotland
- Healthcare Improvement Scotland
- 14 NHS Health boards
- NHS Health Scotland
- The Health Technology Board for Scotland
- The Mental Welfare Commission for Scotland
- Scottish Ambulance Service Board
- The NHS Education for Scotland
- Scottish Hospital Endowments Research Trust
- The Scottish Medical Practices Committee
- The State Hospitals Board for Scotland
- Scottish Children's Reporter Administration
- Scottish Homes
- The Scottish Legal Aid Board
- The Scottish Sports Council
- The Water Authorities

== See also ==
- Standards Board for England
- Adjudication Panel for England
- Northern Ireland Ombudsman
