= Standards Board for England =

Defunct British governmental body

The Standards Board for England was a non-departmental public body sponsored by the Department for Communities and Local Government. Established under the Local Government Act 2000, it was responsible for promoting high ethical standards in local government. It oversaw the nationally imposed Code of Conduct (also now abandoned), which covered elected and co-opted members across a range of local authorities. The board maintained an independent national overview of local investigations into allegations that members' conduct might have fallen short of the required standards. In certain cases the board itself investigated allegations. It could not impose sanctions on members, but if it considered that further action might be necessary, it referred cases to the Adjudication Panel for England or to the relevant authority's own standards committee for determination. Standards committees (no longer compulsory since 2012) could suspend members for up to six months. The Adjudication Panel could disqualify members for up to five years. The Standards Board for England also provided advice, and produced formal guidance, to members and officers on the Code of Conduct.

As part of the 2010 UK quango reforms under the Cameron–Clegg coalition, the board ceased to function on 31 January 2012 and was formally abolished on 31 March 2012.

== Relevant authorities ==
The Standards Board for England investigated complaints against members of the following types of authority in England.

- parish councils
- district, city or borough councils
- county councils
- the City of London Corporation
- unitary authorities, including the Council of the Isles of Scilly
- fire and rescue authorities
- police authorities
- passenger transport authorities
- national park authorities
- the Broads Authority
- the Greater London Authority

It also worked with police authorities in Wales.

== Responsibility for ethical standards ==
Primary responsibility for ensuring ethical standards has rested with the local authorities themselves since before the board was created, and remains with them since it was abolished. The chief executive and legal officers of the authority have a duty to advise members on ethical matters.

Under the system abolished in 2012 each local authority subject to the Code of Conduct had to appoint a monitoring officer and a local standards committee. The standards committee (which had to be chaired by an independent member) was responsible for receiving allegations and deciding whether any action needed to be taken.

Standards for England had the power to direct that a standards committee's assessment and review functions be suspended, and instead undertaken either by Standards for England or by another relevant authority. This generally happened only after a series of attempts to improve performance, either before or after notification from Standards for England, had failed.

== Code of conduct ==
The 2001 Model Code of Conduct was made compulsory for all relevant authorities. It was later revised, after an extensive consultation process, and a new Model Code came into force on 3 May 2007. Revisions included a relaxing of the definition of "personal interest" and an extension of the right of members of authorities to speak in relation to matters in which they had a prejudicial interest. Where members had a prejudicial interest in a matter, they were given the same rights as members of the public to speak at meetings where that matter was being discussed, but were not allowed to vote. A member was deemed to have a personal interest in a matter only if it affected them to a greater extent than it affected the majority of the inhabitants of the locality.

By the Localism Act 2011, and with effect from 2012, the statutory Model Code was abolished, although all local authorities in England were still required to adopt a code of conduct which was consistent with the seven Nolan Principles of public life; they were not prevented from adopting the former code, after its abolition, on a voluntary basis. Since 2012 authorities have not been required to appoint standards committees, but they retain the power to do so.

== Criticism ==
The Standards Board for England was the subject of repeated criticism by the magazine Private Eye for allegedly exceeding its powers, investigating preposterous cases and deterring whistleblowers. The Liberal Democrat peer Lord Tyler raised similar concerns in the House of Lords, saying:

“I have seen that happen time and again with large and small authorities – when apparently disreputable actions of a few leading members or officers of a council have been exposed by a whistleblower, but their reaction has been to seek to silence him or her.

“Instead of welcoming transparency and remedial action, there have been persistent attempts to silence such dissent by claiming that their activities brought the council into disrepute. If a council, in whatever way, is disreputable, it deserves to be given that description. It is not the council that is being brought into disrepute by the dissident member but the behaviour of the council itself in whatever way.”

In 2013, in the aftermath of the abolition of the Standards Board, both Bob Neill, the local government minister at the time, and Brandon Lewis, his successor, were critical of the former standards regime in a debate in Westminster Hall and explained the reasoning for abolishing it and seeking a "light touch" approach instead.

== Office holders ==
The last Chief Executive of the board was Glenys Stacey. Its chair was Dr Robert Chilton.

== See also ==
- Adjudication Panel for England
- Ethical Standards in Public Life etc. (Scotland) Act 2000
- Public Services Ombudsman for Wales
- Standards Commission for Scotland
