= Clay Cross Urban District =

Former local government area in the UK

Clay Cross
- Urban district
- Clay Cross Urban District shown within Derbyshire in 1970
- Interactive map of Clay Cross
- Area
  - 1911: 1,467 acres (5.94 km^{2})
  - 1961: 2,349 acres (9.51 km^{2})
  - Coordinates: 53.1637°N 1.4128°W
- Population
  - 1911: 8,365
  - 1961: 9,163
- History
  - Created: 1894
  - Abolished: 1974
  - Succeeded by: North East Derbyshire
- Status: Urban district
- Government: Clay Cross Urban District Council
  - HQ: Clay Cross
- Subdivisions
  - Type: Civil parish
  - Units: Clay Lane (1894–1935); Egstow (1894–1935); Clay Cross (1935–1974)

Clay Cross was an urban district in Derbyshire, England, from 1894 to 1974. The urban district was created to replace the Clay Cross local board district that had been established in 1875. The district expanded in 1935. The local authority was Clay Cross Urban District Council, which is notable for the Clay Cross rents rebellion in the 1970s. The district was abolished in 1974 but continued as an area for local government as a successor parish.

== History ==
Clay Cross, also known as Clay Lane, was a township within the ancient parish of North Wingfield. It was split off as a separate civil parish in 1866. A local board was formed in 1875. Charles Binns, general manager of the Clay Cross Company, was the first chairman. The local board built a sewage works straddling the boundaries of Clay Lane, Pilsley and Stretton. In 1894, the urban district of Clay Cross was created by the Local Government Act 1894, covering the parishes of Clay Lane and Egstow. (Note: Egstow parish was created on 31 December 1894 from parts of Pilsley and Woodthorpe.) The Egstow parish and the urban district were expanded in 1898 with an area transferred from North Wingfield in Chesterfield Rural District, caused by a changed watercourse.

The Local Government Act 1929 required that district boundaries had to be reviewed. The opportunity was taken to bring all of the Clay Cross Company works into the district and transfer the Clay Cross sewage works into it. The urban district was enlarged on 1 April 1935 when parts of the civil parishes of Pilsley (39 acres), Stretton (278 acres), Tupton (62 acres) and Woodthorpe (503 acres) were transferred from Chesterfield Rural District. The civil parishes of Clay Lane (1,326 acres) and Edgestow (141 acres) were abolished and combined with these areas to form a new parish of Clay Cross which was identical to the urban district.

The district was abolished in 1974 under the Local Government Act 1972 and combined with Dronfield Urban District and Chesterfield Rural District (except the civil parish of Brimington) to form the new North East Derbyshire district. Clay Cross continued as a successor parish area for local government, with a parish council.

== Geography ==
It included Clay Cross, Danesmoor, Egstow, Hollins Green and Newmarket. After the 1935 expansion it also included Holmgate and Old Tupton.

== Clay Cross Urban District Council ==
The district council consisted of nine members in 1894, increasing eleven in 1896. Clay Cross was not divided into wards, so all councillors represented the whole district. Notable former councillors include Dennis Skinner from 1960 to 1970. From the 1959 election, only Labour councillors were returned and from 1963 the council consisted only of Labour members. The councillors in 1972 were Arthur Wellon, Charlie Bunting, Graham Smith, Eileen Wholey, George Goodfellow, Terry Asher, David Nuttall, David Percival, Roy Booker, David Skinner and Graham Skinner.

=== Rents rebellion ===
Between 1972 and 1974, the urban district council was engaged in a dispute with central government when councillors refused to increase council house rents. The Housing Finance Act 1972 required rents to be increased by around 50%. Clay Cross had the lowest rents in the country and Clay Cross was the only council to refuse to increase them. The councillors were surcharged and banned from public office. By November 1974 the £7,000 (equivalent to £66,365 in 2025) surcharge had not been paid and the government was considering legislation to reclaim it by increasing the rates or council rents. This was implemented in the Housing Finance (Special Provisions) Act 1975.

== Population ==
The population of Clay Cross was as follows:

Year	1901	1911	1921	1931	1939	1941	1951	1961
Population	8,358	8,365	8,686	8,497	7,757	(Note: The census was suspended for World War II.)	8,553	9,163
