= Bill Morris (footballer, born 1888) =

English footballer

Personal information
- Full name: William Morris
- Date of birth: 12 February 1888
- Place of birth: Danesmoor, England
- Date of death: 17 March 1949 (aged 61)
- Place of death: Birmingham, England
- Position: Wing half

Senior career*
Years	Team	Apps	(Gls)
- Clay Cross Zingari
1907	Derby County	0	(0)
- Clay Cross Zingari
- Clay Cross Town
1910	Alfreton Town		
1911–1912	Chesterfield Town	24	(2)
1912–1919	Aston Villa	50	(0)
- → Notts County (guest)
- Alfreton Town
1919–1920	Shrewsbury Town		
1920–1921	Cradley Heath		
1921	Clay Cross Town		
- * Club domestic league appearances and goals

William Morris (12 February 1888 – 17 March 1949) was an English professional footballer who played as a wing half in the Football League for Aston Villa.

== Personal life ==
At an unspecified point between 1907 and 1910, Morris lived in the USA. He served on the Western Front with the Royal Army Service Corps during the First World War.

== Career statistics ==
Appearances and goals by club, season and competition
Club	Season	League			FA Cup		Total	
Club	Season	Division	Apps	Goals	Apps	Goals	Apps	Goals
Chesterfield Town	1911–12	Midland League	24	2	1	0	25	2
Aston Villa	1911–12	First Division	1	0	0	0	1	0
Aston Villa	1912–13	First Division	20	0	2	1	22	1
Aston Villa	1913–14	First Division	13	0	0	0	13	0
Aston Villa	1914–15	First Division	16	0	1	0	17	0
Aston Villa	Total		50	0	3	1	53	1
Career total			74	2	4	1	78	3
