= Egstow =

Area of Clay Cross, Derbyshire, England

Coordinates: 53.171°N 1.403°W

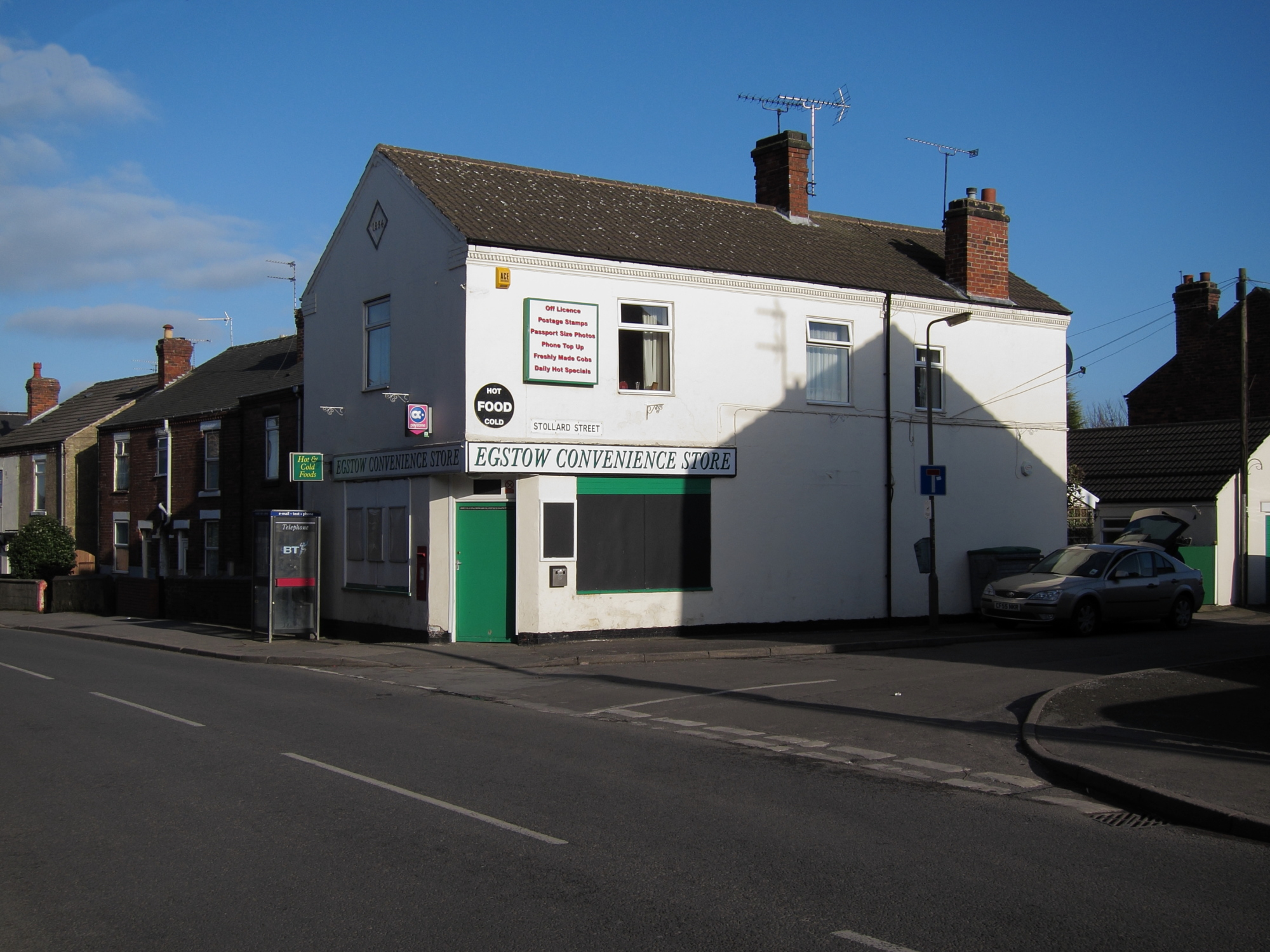
- Egstow Convenience Store, 2011

- Location within Derbyshire
- OS grid reference: SK400639
- Civil parish: Clay Cross
- District: North East Derbyshire
- Shire county: Derbyshire
- Region: East Midlands
- Country: England
- Sovereign state: United Kingdom
- Post town: CHESTERFIELD
- Postcode district: S45
- Dialling code: 01246
- Police: Derbyshire
- Fire: Derbyshire
- Ambulance: East Midlands
- UK Parliament: North East Derbyshire

Egstow is an area of Clay Cross, in the North East Derbyshire district, in the county of Derbyshire, England. The civil parish of Egstow was created in 1894 from the part of the parishes of in Pilsley and Woodthorpe in Clay Cross Urban District. The parish was expanded in 1898 with an area transferred from North Wingfield, caused by a changed watercourse. On 1 April 1935 the parish was abolished and merged with Clay Cross. In 1931 the parish had a population of 836. Egstow Hall is nearby, in the civil parish of Tupton.

== See also ==
- List of places in Derbyshire
