= Old Tupton =

Coordinates: 53.184°N 1.416°W

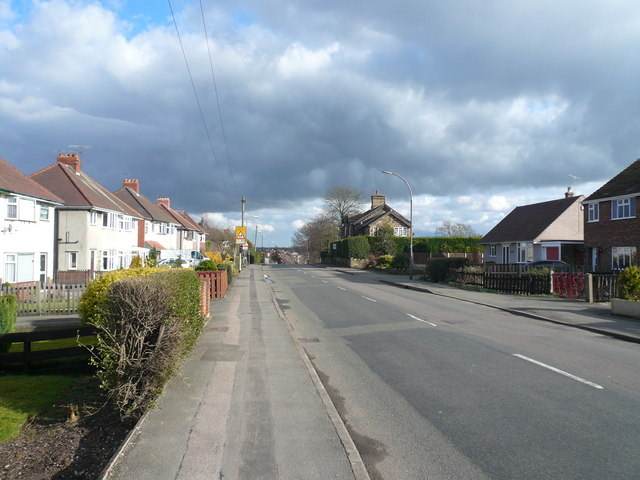
- Station New Road, Old Tupton.

- Location within Derbyshire
- Population: 3,794 (2001)
- OS grid reference: SK391653
- Civil parish: Clay Cross; Tupton
- District: North East Derbyshire
- Shire county: Derbyshire
- Region: East Midlands
- Country: England
- Sovereign state: United Kingdom
- Post town: CHESTERFIELD
- Postcode district: S42
- Dialling code: 01246
- Police: Derbyshire
- Fire: Derbyshire
- Ambulance: East Midlands
- UK Parliament: North East Derbyshire

Old Tupton is a village in Derbyshire, England. It is located on the A61 Derby road, near to Tupton, and to the south of Chesterfield.
