= St Bartholomew's Church, Clay Cross =

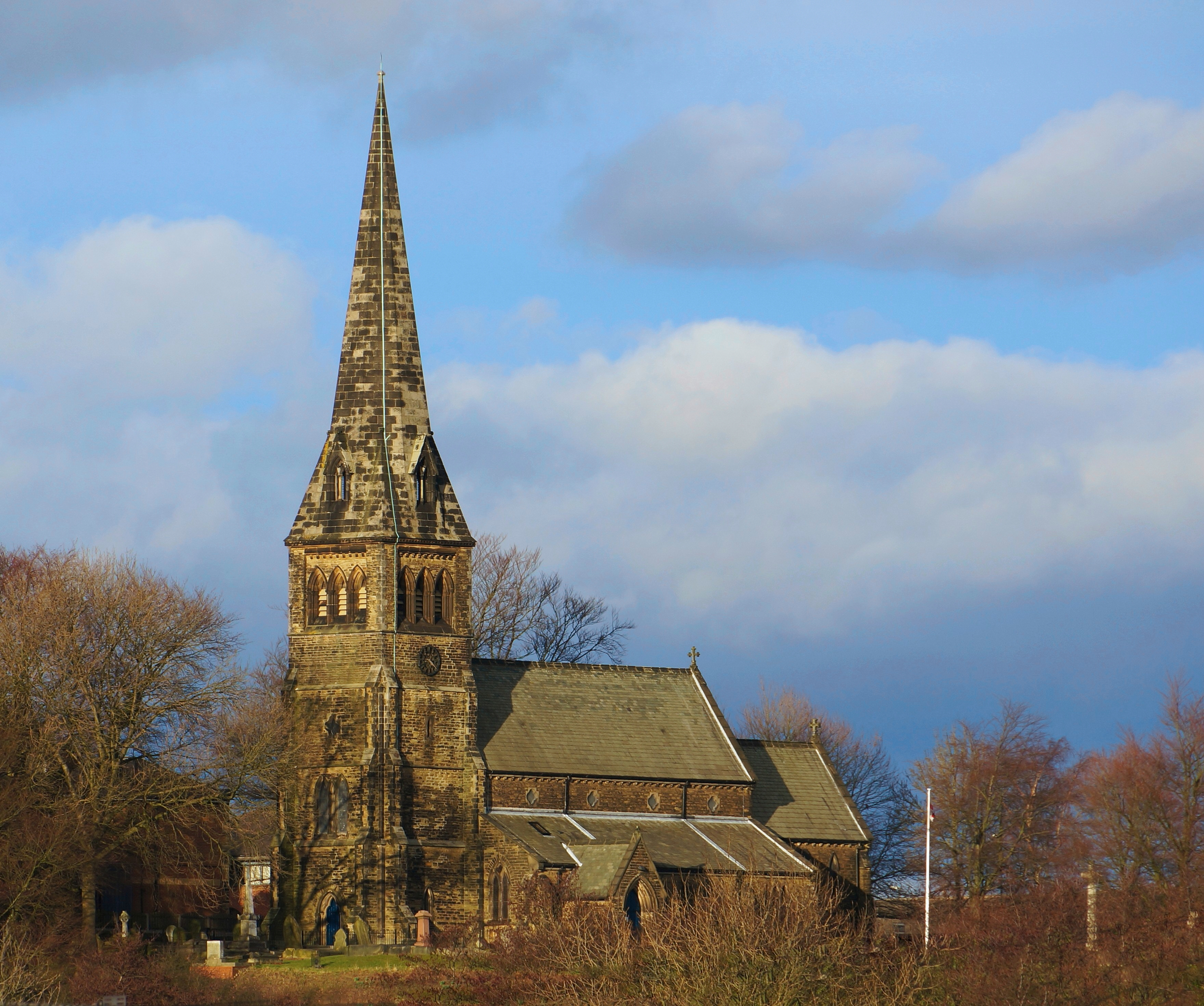
- St Bartholomew's Church, Clay Cross
- St Bartholomew's Church, Clay Cross
- 53°9′41.34″N 1°24′55.17″W
- Location: Clay Cross
- Country: England
- Denomination: Church of England
- Website: claycross.org

History
- Dedication: St Bartholomew
- Consecrated: 25 January 1851

Architecture
- Heritage designation: Grade II listed
- Architect: Henry Isaac Stevens
- Groundbreaking: 22 August 1849
- Construction cost: £2,400 (equivalent to £290,000 in 2025)

Specifications
- Capacity: 450 people
- Length: 78 feet (24 m)
- Width: 43 feet (13 m)
- Height: 125 feet (38 m)

Administration
- Province: Province of Canterbury
- Diocese: Diocese of Derby
- Archdeaconry: Chesterfield
- Deanery: Chesterfield
- Parish: Clay Cross

St Bartholomew's Church, Clay Cross is a Grade II listed parish church in the Church of England in Clay Cross, Derbyshire.

== History ==
The foundation stone was laid on 14 August 1849 on which was inscribed the following dedication:

Hujusce Ecclesiae impensis incolarum de North Wingfield, aliis tamen apprime adjutantibus, libenter conditæ, et Apostolo Bartholomæo dedicata, fundamina feliciter posuit Gladwinus Turbutt de aula adjacente de Ogston Armiger et Justitiarius; die Quarto, decimo mensis Augusti anno Domini Nostri MCCMXLIX et Regina Victoriæ tridecimo. H.I. Stevens, Architectus.

It was built to the designs of the architect Henry Isaac Stevens by the contractors Samuel Watts of Derby and Mr. Kirkland of Clay Cross. It was consecrated by the Bishop of Lichfield on 25 January 1851. The spire was completed in 1856 by Mr. Watt of Ashover. The weather vane was placed on the top of the spire in May 1856 by W.J. Mackarsie to mark the conclusion of the Crimean War

The vestry was added in 1859 by George Edmund Street. The chancel of the church which had been closed for the building of the vestry, was reopened by the bishop of the diocese on 20 March 1859.

The south aisle contains a memorial window by Morris & Co. to William Howe, who invented link motion for railway locomotives.

== Organ ==
The organ was by Charles Lloyd & Co and installed in 1894. It was modified by T.C. Willcock and Co in 1953. A specification of the organ can be found on the National Pipe Organ Register. It has now been replaced by an electronic organ.

== The Bells ==
A peal of six bells was cast in 1937 by John Taylor & Co.

== Parish status ==
The church is in a joint parish with:

- St Lawrence's Church, North Wingfield
- St Barnabas' Church, Danesmoor
- St Mark's Church, Woolley Moor
- St Mary the Virgin's Church, Pilsley
- St John's Church, Tupton

== See also ==
- Listed buildings in Clay Cross
