= Tupton Hall School =

Location
- Station New Road; Chesterfield, Derbyshire, S42 6LG; England; 53°10′56″N 1°24′34″W

Information
- Type: Academy
- Motto: Aspire, Learn, Achieve
- Established: 1929
- Local authority: Derbyshire
- Trust: Redhill Academy Trust (since 2019)
- Department for Education URN: 146099 Tables
- Ofsted: Reports
- Headteacher: Andrew Knowles
- Gender: Coeducational
- Age: 11 to 18
- Enrolment: 1650
- Houses: Gladwin, Cavendish, Hunloke, Turbutt, Kenning
- Colours: Gladwin – red Cavendish – green Hunloke – blue Turbutt – purple Kenning – yellow
- Website: http://www.tuptonhall.derbyshire.sch.uk/

Tupton Hall School is a coeducational secondary school and sixth form located in Chesterfield in the English county of Derbyshire. It is one of the largest secondary schools in the North East Derbyshire district, with a large body of students and one of the largest sixth forms in the county.

== History ==
=== Grammar school ===
Tupton Hall Grammar School was founded in 1936 as a secondary school in the Clay Cross area on a site purchased by the Derbyshire Education Committee in 1929. The site was formerly occupied by the mansion Tupton Hall. The original building was designed by G.H. Widdows, the county architect, and was opened by Oliver Stanley, the Secretary of State for Education.

=== Comprehensive school ===
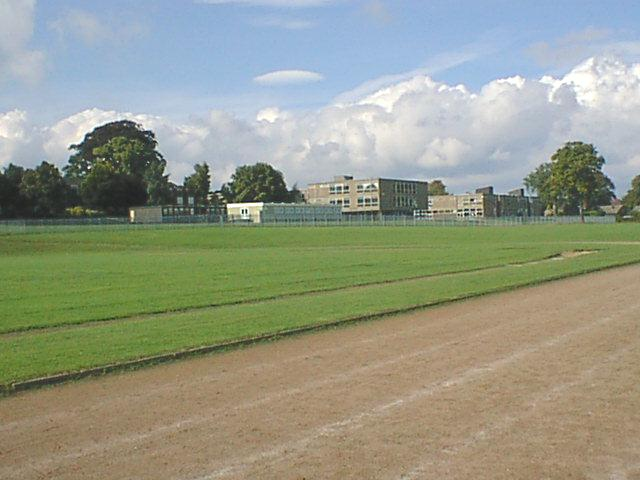
The school before the millennium, showing the original running track, K, Sixth Form and, design and technology blocks.

From 1967 to 1969, many new buildings were constructed to prepare for the transformation to becoming a much larger comprehensive school (750 pupils at the grammar school became 1,800 at the new comprehensive). The new school opened in 1969. The remodelled school was well regarded as an architectural achievement using the CLASP system which allowed standard components for school construction. Nikolaus Pevsner described it as "one of the best uses of the CLASP system for school buildings in the country ... creating a village type atmosphere". Architects were George Grey & Partners in association with D.S. Davies (county architect).

The school was severely run down by the new millennium and the new school opened in Easter 2003.

=== New school ===
The school is a specialist sports college and is one of the most modern school buildings in the county, being the tester school for the new school design permeating throughout Derbyshire and the East Midlands with many modern features, built under a PFI scheme.

The school has been twinned with a school in Nigeria to further aid relations between Tupton and its twin village in Nigeria. It has also gained the full International Schools Award.

Previously a community school administered by Derbyshire County Council, in September 2019 Tupton Hall School converted to academy status. The school is now sponsored by the Redhill Academy Trust.

== About Tupton Hall School ==
In the village of Old Tupton in North East Derbyshire, Tupton Hall is situated about four miles from Chesterfield, the nearest large town, despite the school being relatively close to the town, Chesterfield itself is not in the school's catchment area, which focuses on the town of Clay Cross and the villages of Wingerworth, Tupton and Ashover. Tupton Hall is a comprehensive school, so does not selectively admit pupils.

For results at A Level and GCSE, 95% of students attain grades above the national average, and the exam results for the school as a whole are also above the England average.

=== Sixth form ===
Tupton Hall has one of the largest sixth forms in the North East Derbyshire area, with nearly 400 students.

== Notable former pupils ==
=== As a grammar school ===
- Sir Geoffrey Allen, chemist, chancellor from 1993 to 2003 of the University of East Anglia, and head of research from 1981 to 1990 at Unilever
- Emmanuel Cooper, potter
- George Eason, professor of mathematics from 1970 to 1983 at the University of Strathclyde, and former dean of the School of Mathematics and Physics, and expert in solid mechanics
- Ian Hall, cricketer for Derbyshire
- Colin Holmes, professor of history from 1989 to 1998 at the University of Sheffield
- Bill Leivers, footballer
- Dennis Skinner, Labour MP between 1970 and 2019 for Bolsover

=== As a comprehensive ===
- Ben Miles, actor
- Savannah Stevenson, actress
- Jacob Whittle, swimmer and Olympian

=== New school ===
- Emma Laird, actress and model

== Former teachers ==
- Roger Walker, taught drama at the comprehensive in the early 1970s.
- Philip Harries, taught design and technology at the new school during the 2010s.
