= Holmgate =

Hamlet in Derbyshire, England

Coordinates: 53.16926°N 1.43614°W

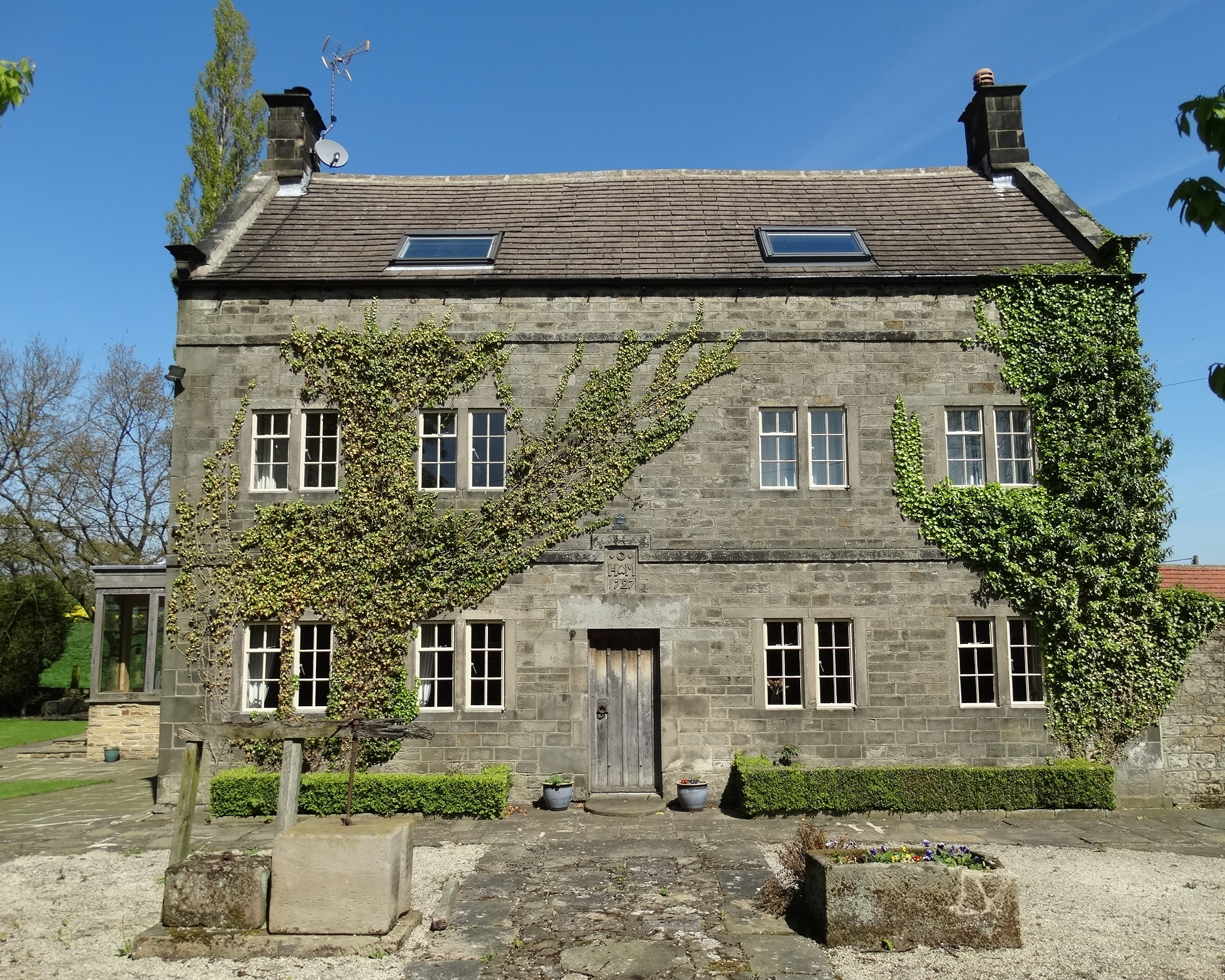
- Holmgate House

- Location within Derbyshire
- OS grid reference: SK372633
- Civil parish: Clay Cross
- District: North East Derbyshire
- Shire county: Derbyshire
- Region: East Midlands
- Country: England
- Sovereign state: United Kingdom
- Post town: CHESTERFIELD
- Postcode district: S45
- Police: Derbyshire
- Fire: Derbyshire
- Ambulance: East Midlands
- UK Parliament: North East Derbyshire

Holmgate is a hamlet and nearby housing estate between Clay Cross (where the population can be found) and Ashover, in the district of North East Derbyshire, England.

== Transport links ==
=== Buses ===
Clay Cross is served by the Number 51 Stagecoach bus service: Chesterfield – Tupton – Clay Cross – Danesmoor. It runs about every 10 minutes.

=== Trains ===
Chesterfield railway station (6 miles) provides frequent services to Alfreton, Derby, Nottingham, Sheffield, Leeds and elsewhere.

=== Road ===
The main road through Holmgate is Holmgate Road.

=== Air ===
Holmgate is about 45 minutes' drive (road traffic permitting) from East Midlands Airport and 1.5 hours from Birmingham and airports.

== Schools ==
- Holmgate Primary School and Nursery
- Tupton Hall School

== Churches ==
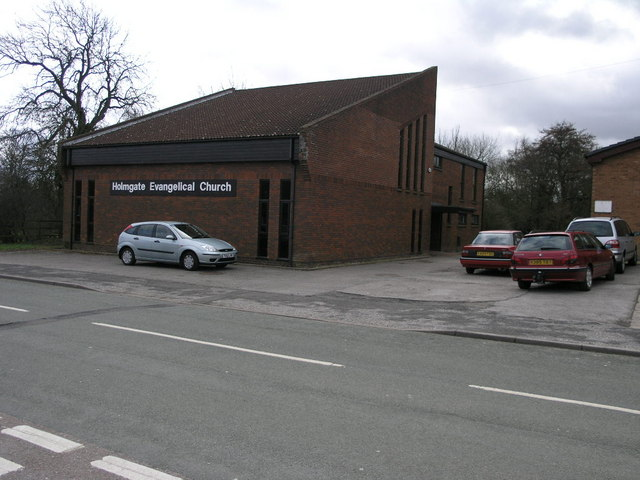
Holmgate Evangelical Church

Holmgate Evangelical Church (a member of the Fellowship of Independent Evangelical Churches) started in 1974 in a community centre; the church grew and moved into its own building in 1981.
