= Listed buildings in North Wingfield =

North Wingfield is a civil parish in the North East Derbyshire district of Derbyshire, England. The parish contains eleven listed buildings that are recorded in the National Heritage List for England. Of these, one is listed at Grade I, the highest of the three grades, and the others are at Grade II, the lowest grade. The parish contains the large village of North Wingfield and the surrounding area. The listed buildings consist of a church and associated structures, houses, a farmhouse, an old cross, a public house, and a range of stables.

== Key ==
Grade	Criteria
I	Buildings of exceptional interest, sometimes considered to be internationally important
II	Buildings of national importance and special interest

== Buildings ==
Name and location	Photograph	Date	Notes	Grade
Blue Bell Inn; 53.17628°N 1.39594°W		12th century	The public house was much restored and altered in the 19th and 20th centuries. It is in sandstone with a Welsh slate roof, and has later additions in brick. There are two storeys, an L-shaped plan, the additions with a single storey. On the north front is a Gothic arch containing a doorway and a window, and at the northwest corner is a buttress. On the west front is a chamfered string course, and all the windows are casements.	II
St Lawrence's Church; 53.17575°N 1.39616°W		12th century	The church has been altered and extended through the centuries, the north aisle was rebuilt in 1860, the south aisle was restored in 1872, and there was a general restoration in 1879–80. The church is built in sandstone with copper roofs, and consists of a nave with a clerestory, north and south aisles, a south porch, a north transept, a chancel with a north vestry, and a west tower. The tower has four stages, string courses, angle buttresses, and a west doorway with a three-light window above. There are clock faces on the north and south sides, the bell openings are paired with two lights, and above them is a decorated frieze and an embattled parapet. The body of the church is embattled, and inside, the north wall contains a 12th-century window.	I
Old Cross; 53.17947°N 1.38882°W		Medieval	The cross, which is set in an enclosure by a road junction, was restored in 1936. It is in sandstone and consists of part of a shaft on a socket stone on three steps. The socket stone is inscribed with the directions to Mansfield, Derby and Chesterfield, showing that at one time it was used as a guide stone.	II
The Manor House; 53.17584°N 1.39573°W		c. 1702	Originally a rectory, it is in sandstone, partly rendered, with sandstone dressings, quoins, a coped parapet to the south, and a tile roof with coped gables and moulded kneelers. There are two storeys and a U-shaped plan, consisting of a central range with five bays, and projecting two-bay wings. The doorways have moulded surrounds, and most of the windows are sashes. In the west front are Gothic-style windows, and there is a re-set datestone with an inscription and the date 1690.	II
The Elms; 53.18115°N 1.39012°W	—	c. 1720	A sandstone house with quoins, angle pilasters on the front, a string course and a cornice between the floors, a parapet on the front, and a stone slate roof with coped gables and some moulded kneelers. There are three storeys and an L-shaped plan, with a symmetrical front range of five bays and a rear wing of three bays. The central doorway has a rusticated surround, a rectangular fanlight, a lintel with a keystone, and a hood mould. The windows are sashes, the window above the doorway with a keystone. In the rear wing are mullioned windows.	II
Bright Street Farmhouse; 53.18058°N 1.39027°W		Early 18th century	The farmhouse is in rendered sandstone with sandstone dressings, giant pilasters on the east front, and a tile roof with coped gables and moulded kneelers. There are two storeys and an attic, and a symmetrical front of five bays. In the centre is a doorway with a massive lintel and jambs. The windows are mullioned with two lights, and at the rear is a staircase tower.	II
St Lawrence; 53.17933°N 1.38854°W	—	18th century	The house is in sandstone and has a roof of Welsh slate and stone slate. There are two storeys and six bays. On the front is a gabled porch and a doorway with a pointed-arched head. Most of the windows are sashes, and the others date from the 20th century.	II
Stables, White Hart Inn; 53.18031°N 1.38867°W	—	18th century	The stables are in sandstone with a Welsh slate roof and two storeys. In the ground floor is a carriage entrance with a segmental arch, two doorways with heavy lintels, a doorway with a stone lintel and jambs, and square openings, and the upper floor contains sash windows.	II
The Homestead; 53.18042°N 1.38964°W		Early 19th century	A sandstone house with quoins, a projecting eaves band, and a slate roof with coped gables and moulded kneelers. There are two storeys and three bays. The central doorway has a moulded surround and a hood mould. The windows are sashes, the window above the doorway with a round arch and projecting impost blocks. On the west front is a staircase window with a transom.	II
Railings, gate piers and bollards, St Lawrence's Church; 53.17589°N 1.39582°W		Late 19th century	The cast iron railings flank a footpath to the east of the church. At the north end are two square sandstone gate piers, between them is a bollard, and across them is a semicircular wrought iron arch with decorative finials. At the south end are three bollards and an octagonal gate pier with a cast iron finial.	II
Urinal; 53.17584°N 1.39631°W	—	c. 1885	The urinal to the north of the tower of St Lawrence's Church is in cast iron and open to the south. The other three sides consist of four panels with bead moulding between them. The bottom panel is plan, the panel above is decorated and contains the manufacturer's name, above that is a panel with fretwork decoration and the top panel has vertical ventilation slits. At the top is dogtooth cresting.	II
