= Listed buildings in Clay Cross =

Clay Cross is a civil parish in the North East Derbyshire district of Derbyshire, England. The parish contains 13 listed buildings that are recorded in the National Heritage List for England. All the listed buildings are designated at Grade II, the lowest of the three grades, which is applied to "buildings of national importance and special interest". The parish contains the town of Clay Cross and the surrounding area. The listed buildings consist of houses, cottages and associated structures, a church, a milepost, the portals of a railway tunnel, items in a cemetery, and a war memorial.

== Buildings ==
Name and location	Photograph	Date	Notes
Woodthorpe Hall and Cottage; 53.18021°N 1.42809°W	—	Early 17th century	The house, which probably has an earlier timber framed core, was later extended. It is in sandstone with quoins, and roofs of slate and stone slate with moulded gable copings, plain kneelers, and finials. There are two storeys and attics, and an L-shaped plan, consisting of a hall range and a gabled cross-wing. The doorway has a moulded surround and a fanlight, and most of the windows are mullioned and transomed. Over the ground floor openings is a continuous hood mould.
Henmore Cottage; 53.16946°N 1.43265°W		17th century	The cottage, which was extended at the rear in the 19th century, is in sandstone at the front and gritstone at the rear, with gritstone dressings, quoins, a tile roof at the front, and a slate roof at the rear. There are two storeys, a double depth plan, and two bays. In the centre is a gabled porch with bargeboards, and the windows on the front and sides are mullioned, and at the rear they are sashes.
Ashmore House; 53.16886°N 1.43265°W	—	1675	A farmhouse that was refronted in the 19th century, it is in sandstone, and has a roof of stone slate and tile with moulded gable copings and kneelers. There are two storeys, three bays, and a single-storey extension to the south. The windows on the front are sashes, in the south gable wall is a blocked doorway over which is an initialled and dated plaque, and at the rear are two three-light mullioned windows.
Holmgate House; 53.16908°N 1.44100°W		1727	A sandstone house with quoins, string courses, and a tile roof with moulded gable copings and kneelers. There are two storeys and attics, an L-shaped plan, and a front of four bays. In the centre is a doorway with a quoined surround, over which is a dated and initialled plaque, and an insurance plate. The windows are mullioned and contain casements, and in the rear wing is a mullioned and transomed stair window.
Deerleap Cottages; 53.16369°N 1.45192°W	—	18th century	Six back to back cottages, later combined into two cottages, they are in sandstone with gritstone dressings, quoins, and roofs partly in slate and partly in stone slate. There are two storeys, a double pile plan, and three bays. The doorways have quoined surrounds, and most of the windows either have a single light, or are mullioned.
Handley Lodge Farmhouse, outbuildings and wall 53.15628°N 1.43396°W	—	Mid 18th century	The farmhouse and outbuildings form three sides of a square, the house at the north, the barn on the east, and the cowshed on the south. They are in sandstone, the house with gritstone dressings, and all with quoins, and slate roofs with coped gables. The house has moulded kneelers, and the other kneelers are plain; the house and barn have two storeys, and the cowshed has one. In the house are three bays, a central doorway with a quoined surround, and mullioned windows. The barn has six bays, and the cowshed three.
Milepost; 53.15903°N 1.41459°W	—	Early 19th century	The milepost is on the west side of Stretton Road (A61 road), and is in cast iron. It has a triangular section, a flat back, and a segmental-arched head. The mile post is inscribed with "TOWNSHIP OF STRETTON", the distances to Derby, Chesterfield, Dronfield, and Sheffield, and the maker's name.
South Portal, Clay Cross Tunnel; 53.16108°N 1.41957°W		1836–39	The tunnel was built by the North Midland Railway to carry its line under the town. The portal is in gritstone, and consists of a horseshoe-shaped arch flanked by rusticated buttresses and retaining walls. The portal has a band course with moulding above, and a parapet acting as a cornice.
North Portal, Clay Cross Tunnel; 53.17375°N 1.40731°W		1838–40	The tunnel was built by the North Midland Railway to carry its line under the town. The portal is in stone, and consists of an elliptical arch with rounded mouldings, over which is an embattled parapet. The arch is flanked by tapering octagonal columns with moulded string courses, slit and arrow windows, and embattled parapets.
St Bartholomew's Church; 53.16540°N 1.41608°W		1848–50	The church was designed by H. I. Stevens, and the north vestry was added in 1858–59 by G. E. Street. The church is built in sandstone with a Westmorland slate roof, and is in Early English style. It consists of a nave with a clerestory, north and south aisles, a south porch, a chancel, a north vestry, and a west steeple. The steeple has a four-stage tower with clasping buttresses, a west door, a stair turret on the northwest corner, and a broach spire with lucarnes.
Cemetery Chapels; 53.16152°N 1.40717°W		1878	A pair of chapels in red brick, with sandstone dressings, and slate roofs with terracotta ridge tiles. Each chapel has a central gabled porch on the side, and between them is a tower. The tower has louvred mullioned and transomed bell openings on each side, over which is a string course with corner gargoyles, and a pyramidal spire with corner pinnacles and lucarnes.
Monument, Clay Cross Cemetery; 53.16144°N 1.40718°W		1884	The monument is to the memory of those lost in an explosion at Park House Pit in 1882, and consists of the statue of a weeping woman in marble. This stands on a stone base consisting of a tall quatrefoil pillar with a gableted base, a band of ball flower decoration, and a foliate capital on a stepped plinth. On the front is an inscribed panel, and on the sides are panels with the names of those lost in the explosion.
Danesmoor War Memorial; 53.16438°N 1.39934°W		1922	The war memorial is in an enclosure surrounded by a low wall at a road junction. It consists of a statue in white marble depicting a soldier with a rifle in front of a tree stump. This stands on a square concrete pedestal on a square base. On the pedestal are bronze plaques with inscriptions and the names of those lost in the two World Wars.
