= George Eason =

British mathematician

George Eason FRSE FIMA (15 March 1930 – 15 May 1999) was a British mathematician who was a Professor of Mathematics at Strathclyde University from 1970 to 1983. He worked on the dynamical theory of elasticity, and wrote papers relating to mathematical solutions of problems of human biology, including heat transfer through skin, the light-scattering effects of blood, and analysis of blood oxygenators.

== Life ==
He was born in Chesterfield, Derbyshire, England on 15 March 1930, the son of Henry Swindell Eason and Annie Shepherd Warchurst. He was raised in North Wingfield and educated at Clay Cross and in 1941, he won a scholarship to attend Tupton Hall School. In 1948 he won a county scholarship, enabling him to study Mathematics and Physics at Birmingham University under Prof Rudolph Peierls, gaining a BSc in 1951 and MSc in 1952 (the latter technically being the first degree presented by Keele University). He received his doctorate (PhD) in 1954.

He first worked in the Royal Armament Research and Development Establishment in Kent as their Scientific Officer. In 1957, he began lecturing in Mathematics at Newcastle University under Prof Albert E. Green, then in 1961 he became Senior Lecturer in Mathematics at Strathclyde University. In 1970 he gained the professorship and stayed there until he retired in 1983.

In 1975, he was elected a Fellow of the Royal Society of Edinburgh. His proposers were William D. Collins, Ian Sneddon, Norrie Everitt and Peter Ludwig Pauson.

He was also a Fellow of the Institute of Mathematics and its Applications.

In later life he retired to Aboyne in Aberdeenshire, Scotland and died there on 15 May 1999.

== Family and private life ==
He married twice: first in 1958 to Olive Holdstock; secondly to Esme Burgess.

He had two daughters by his first marriage: Ann and Jill. The family then lived in Balfron.

He was a member of the Rotary Club of Strathendrick and served as their President for many years, being awarded the Paul Harris Fellowship for his services to the local community. He was also a keen marathon runner.
