= Listed buildings in Tupton =

Tupton is a civil parish in the North East Derbyshire district of Derbyshire, England, UK. The parish contains six listed buildings that are recorded in the National Heritage List for England. All the listed buildings are designated at Grade II, the lowest of the three grades, which is applied to "buildings of national importance and special interest". The parish contains the village of Tupton and the surrounding area, and the listed buildings consist of houses, farmhouses and farm buildings.

== Buildings ==
Name and location	Photograph	Date	Notes
Barn and outbuildings, Egstow Hall; 53.18053°N 1.41682°W		15th century	A cruck framed barn with walls in sandstone, quoins, and slate roofs with moulded stone gable copings. There is an L-shaped plan, consisting of a single-storey barn with four bays, and lower single-storey five-bay outbuildings. The openings include stable doors, an archway, triangular openings and windows. In the east gable end are steps to a doorway, and inside the barn are three cruck trusses.
Hagg Hill House; 53.18977°N 1.39543°W	—	1666	The house, which has been altered, is in sandstone with gritstone dressings and quoins, and the 19th-century extension is in gritstone. The roof is slated, with moulded stone gable copings, kneelers, and finials. The main range has two storeys and attics, and three gables, and there are two-storey side wings. The doorway has a chamfered massive quoined surround, and most of the windows are mullioned. On the west gable is an initialled and dated plaque.
Egstow Hall; 53.18076°N 1.41681°W		1671	The house is in sandstone with gritstone quoins, moulded string courses, and slate roofs with moulded gable copings and kneelers. There are two storeys and attics and a T-shaped plan with a front range of two bays, and a gabled stair turret in the angle. The doorway has a chamfered surround and two lintels, the upper one with a fleur-de-lys pattern and a keystone. The windows are mullioned, and there are two inscribed and dated plaques.
Pear Tree Farmhouse; 53.18114°N 1.41864°W	—	1677	The farmhouse is in sandstone with gritstone dressings, quoins, and a slate roof with overhanging eaves. There are two storeys and two bays. In the ground floor are two three-light recessed and chamfered mullioned windows, and the upper floor contains two recessed casement windows with chamfered surrounds. In the north gable end are recessed and chamfered single-light windows, and an initialled datestone.
Barn north of Hagg Hill House; 53.19001°N 1.39560°W	—	1693	The barn is in sandstone with gritstone dressings, quoins, and slate roofs with moulded stone gable copings and plain kneelers. There is a single storey, a rectangular plan, and six bays. In the west gable wall is a large segmental arch with a quoined surround, and elsewhere are doorways, windows and an initialled datestone.
Ankerbold; 53.18669°N 1.40420°W	—	Early 19th century	A farmhouse in sandstone with gritstone dressings, rusticated quoins, and a slate roof with stone coped gables and moulded kneelers. There are two storeys and three bays. In the centre is a porch flanked by doorways, and in the upper floor are sash windows, all with plain surrounds.
