= Chesterfield Rural District =

Former local government area in the UK

Chesterfield
- Chesterfield Rural District shown within Derbyshire in 1970
- Area
  - 1911: 68,986 acres (279.18 km^{2})
  - 1961: 69,139 acres (279.80 km^{2})
- Population
  - 1911: 72,277
  - 1961: 101,041
- History
  - Created: 1894
  - Abolished: 1974
  - Succeeded by: North East Derbyshire
- Status: Rural district
- Government: Chesterfield Rural District Council

Chesterfield Rural District was a rural district in Derbyshire, England, from 1894 to 1974. It was created under the Local Government Act 1894. It was named after, but did not include, the town of Chesterfield.

The district was abolished in 1974 under the Local Government Act 1972 and combined with Clay Cross Urban District and Dronfield Urban District to form the new North East Derbyshire district, except Brimington which was incorporated into the borough of Chesterfield.

== Premises ==
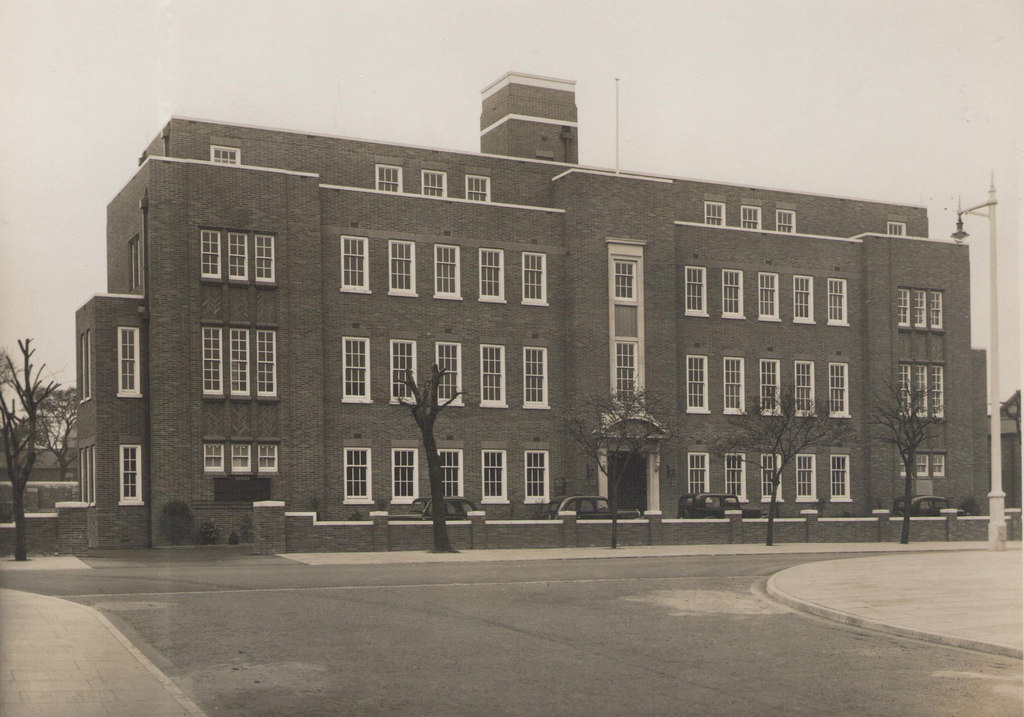
Rural Council House, Saltergate, Chesterfield: Council's headquarters, completed 1938.

The council was initially based at various offices across the district and in the neighbouring town of Chesterfield. The council subsequently built itself a headquarters on Saltergate in Chesterfield, which was formally opened on 24 March 1938. The building was subsequently extended and used as the headquarters of North East Derbyshire District Council until 2015.
