= Biwater F.C. =

Biwater
- Full name: Biwater Football Club

Biwater F.C. was an English football club based in Clay Cross, Derbyshire.

== History ==
They were known as Clay Cross Works until 1988. Under their former name they reached the 4th round of the FA Vase in 1980.

== Records ==
- FA Vase
  - 4th round – 1979–80
