= Danesmoor War Memorial =

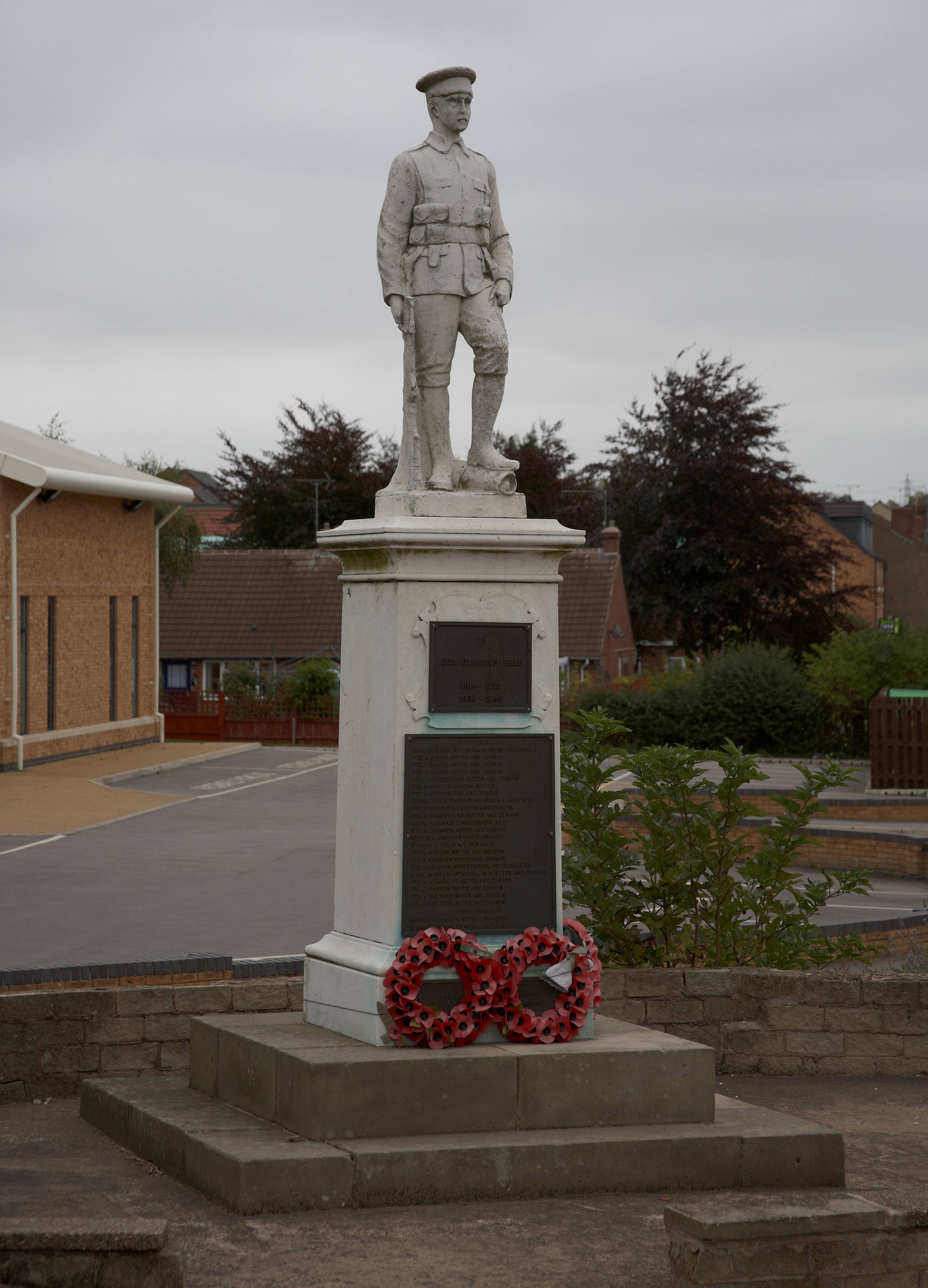
- Danesmoor War Memorial

- Location in Derbyshire
- 53°09′52″N 1°23′58″W
- Location: Clay Cross, Derbyshire, England

Listed Building – Grade II
- Official name: War Memorial
- Designated: 19 January 2016
- Reference no.: 1430663

Danesmoor War Memorial is a 20th-century grade II listed war memorial in Clay Cross, Derbyshire.

== History ==
The war memorial was unveiled on 11 August 1922. It features the names of local residents who died during the First World War. The memorial was later renovated following World War II.

The memorial has been Grade II listed since 19 January 2016.

== See also ==
- Listed buildings in Clay Cross
