= Clay Cross Town F.C. (1874) =

English football club

Clay Cross Town
- Full name: Clay Cross Town Football Club
- Founded: 1874
- Dissolved: 1896

Clay Cross Town F.C. was the name of an English football club based in Clay Cross, Derbyshire.

== History ==
The club was formed in the 1870s and competed in the FA Cup on three occasions in the 1890s before folding.

They were the first of three prominent clubs to take the name of Clay Cross Town, the second was formed in 1909, and the third in 2010.

=== Records ===
- FA Cup
  - 2nd qualifying round – 1893–94
