= Clay Cross Town F.C. =

Association football club in England

Coordinates: 53°10′19″N 1°25′57″W

Clay Cross Town
- Full name: Clay Cross Town Football Club
- Nickname: The Millers / The Rebels
- Founded: 1989 (as Parkhouse FC)
- Ground: The Adalynne Haye Stadium
- Capacity: 500
- Chairman: Lee Watson
- Manager: Ryan Smith & Lee Fletcher
- Coach: Aaron Parkin
- League: United Counties League Premier Division North
- 2025–26: United Counties League Premier Division North, 9th of 20

Clay Cross Town Football Club is an English football club based in Clay Cross, Derbyshire. The club plays in the United Counties League Premier Division North.

== History ==
Formed in 1989 as Parkhouse F.C., the club joined the Central Midlands Football League in 2007. They won promotion from the Premier Division to the Supreme Division in 2010, and upon the league's restructuring a year later were placed in the North Division.

In the summer of 2012 the club was renamed Clay Cross Town F.C., meaning they would be the third club to take such a name - the first and second had both played in the FA Cup over a century earlier.

In 2016, the club made its debut in the FA Vase. On 8 November 2016 the newly formed club reached the third round of the Derbyshire Senior Cup Competition for the first time after beating Pinxton at Mill Lane 5–2. The third-round tie played on 6 December 2016 saw them host Evo-Stik club Buxton. Before a crowd of 150 the Millers lost 2–1 to the Bucks.

In 2023, the club was promoted to the Northern Counties East League for the 2023-24 season.

== Records ==
- Best FA Cup performance: Preliminary round, 2025–26
- Best FA Vase performance: Fourth round, 2024–25

== Honours ==
- United Counties League
  - Division One Champions: 2024–25
- Central Midland League South
  - Champions 2022–23
