= New Tupton United F.C. =

New Tupton United
- Full name: New Tupton United Football Club

New Tupton United Football Club was an English association football club based in Tupton, Derbyshire. It competed in the FA Cup in the early 1920s.
