= Dronfield Urban District =

Defunct administrative unit in Derbyshire, United Kingdom (1894–1974)

Coordinates: 53.3024°N 1.4664°W

Dronfield
- Dronfield Urban District shown within Derbyshire in 1970
- Area
  - 1911: 1,045 acres (4.23 km^{2})
  - 1961: 3,452 acres (13.97 km^{2})
- Population
  - 1911: 3,943
  - 1961: 11,303
- History
  - Created: 1894
  - Abolished: 1974
  - Succeeded by: North East Derbyshire
- Status: Urban District
- Government: Dronfield Urban District Council
  - HQ: Dronfield

Dronfield was an Urban District in Derbyshire, England, from 1894 to 1974. It was created under the Local Government Act 1894.

It was enlarged in 1935 when parts of the civil parishes of Coal Aston, Dronfield Woodhouse and Unstone were transferred to the district.

The district was abolished in 1974 under the Local Government Act 1972 and combined with Chesterfield Rural District (except the civil parish of Brimington) and Clay Cross Urban District to form the new North East Derbyshire district.
