= Clay Cross & Danesmoor Welfare F.C. =

English football club

Clay Cross & Danesmoor Welfare
- Full name: Clay Cross & Danesmoor Welfare Football Club

Clay Cross & Danesmoor Welfare F.C. was an English football club, based in Clay Cross, Derbyshire.

== History ==
They reached the third qualifying round of the FA Cup in 1957.

== Records ==
- FA Cup
  - 3rd qualifying round – 1956–57
