= Geoffrey Allen (chemist) =

British chemist (1928–2023)

- Born: 29 October 1928; Clay Cross, Derbyshire
- Died: 15 March 2023 (aged 94)
- Education: Tupton Hall School; University of Leeds
- Scientific career
- Institutions: University of Manchester; Imperial College London; Unilever

Sir Geoffrey Allen FRS FREng (29 October 1928 – 15 March 2023) was a British chemist who also served as a Vice-President of the Royal Society. He was primarily known for his work on the physics and chemistry of polymers. Allen was especially well known for his work on the thermodynamics of rubber elasticity. He inspired a generation of physical chemists as a result of his research interests, and he had a passion for fostering links between academia and industry.

== Career ==
Born in Clay Cross, Derbyshire on 29 October 1928, Allen was educated at Tupton Hall Grammar School and the University of Leeds. He was Lecturer (1955–65) and Professor of Chemical Physics (1965–75) at the University of Manchester. Moving to London, he became Professor of Polymer Science (1975–76), Professor of Chemical Technology (1976–81) at Imperial College London. He chaired the Science Research Council from 1977–81.

Allen was Head of Research at Unilever from 1981–90, and a Director of Unilever from 1982–90. Since 1990 he has been an Adviser to Kobe Steel Ltd. He was Vice-President of the Royal Society from 1991–93, and Chancellor of the University of East Anglia from 1993–2003. He was a member of the Royal Commission on Environmental Protection from 1994–2000, and President of the Institute of Materials, Minerals and Mining, (formerly the Institute of Materials) from 1994–95. He is an Honorary Fellow of Robinson College, Cambridge. In 1985 he received an Honorary Doctorate from the University of Bath.

Allen was awarded an honorary doctorate from the University of Essex in 1986, and an honorary doctorate from Loughborough University in July 1985, when he was pleased to share the stage with his godson who received his bachelor's degree at the same time.

Allen was President (1989–1991) of the Society of Chemical Industry, gave the Leverhulme lecture in 1990 (Our Chemical Industry 2001), and was awarded the society's Lampitt medal in 2017.

Sir Geoffrey Allen died at his home on 15 March 2023, at the age of 94.
