= St Lawrence's Church, North Wingfield =

St Lawrence’s Church, North Wingfield
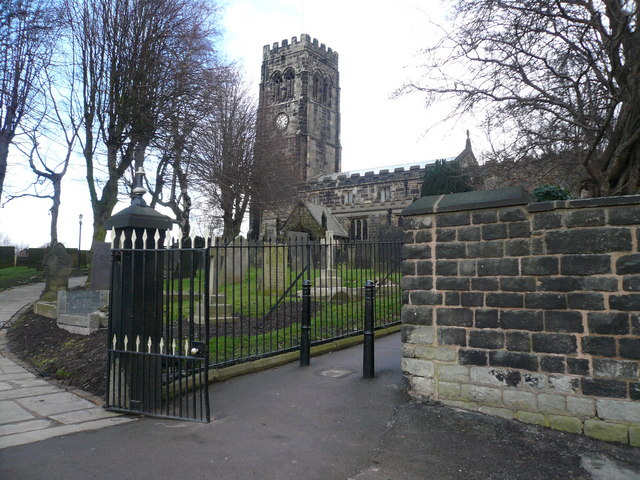
- St Lawrence’s Church, North Wingfield
- St Lawrence’s Church, North Wingfield
- 53°10′32.91″N 1°23′46.58″W
- Location: North Wingfield
- Country: England
- Denomination: Church of England

History
- Dedication: St Lawrence

Architecture
- Heritage designation: Grade I listed

Administration
- Province: Province of Canterbury
- Diocese: Diocese of Derby
- Archdeaconry: Chesterfield
- Deanery: Chesterfield
- Parish: North Wingfield

St Lawrence’s Church, North Wingfield is a Grade I listed parish church in the Church of England in North Wingfield, Derbyshire.

== History ==
The porch of the church dates from the 12th century, but is mostly 14th and 15th century.

A restoration was carried out in 1880 by the architects Richard Herbert Carpenter and Benjamin Ingelow of London. The contractor was Rollinson of Saltergate, Chesterfield. The Lady chapel exterior walls were restored and the tracery in the East window was renewed. The floors in the nave were relaid at a lower level and refloored in stone. The chancel was laid with Minton encaustic tiles. The seating was renewed with oak pews. It was reopened by the Bishop of Lichfield on 13 December 1880. The east window of the chancel was fitted with a stained glass in memory of the Rector’s wife, and was executed by Clayton and Bell.

The church is noted for three 14th-century reliefs:

- The Martyrdom of St Lawrence at the east end of the south aisle
- The Annunciation in the Vestry
- Christ in Majesty with the Virgin and Angels.

== Organ ==
The organ is by Charles Lloyd & Co. It was opened on 12 June 1890. A specification of the organ can be found on the National Pipe Organ Register.

== Parish status ==
The church is in a team parish with:

- St Bartholomew’s, Clay Cross
- St Barnabas’ Church and Centre, Danesmoor
- St Mary the Virgin, Pilsley
- St John’s, Tupton

== See also ==
- Grade I listed churches in Derbyshire
- Grade I listed buildings in Derbyshire
- Listed buildings in North Wingfield
