= Tupton =

Village in Derbyshire, England

Coordinates: 53.1905°N 1.4073°W

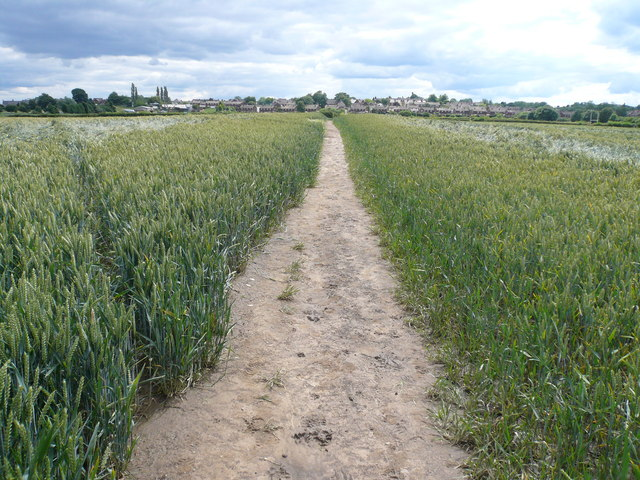
- Avenue Washlands Nature Reserve, Tupton

- Location within Derbyshire
- Population: 3,428 (2011)
- OS grid reference: SK397661
- Civil parish: Tupton
- District: North East Derbyshire
- Shire county: Derbyshire
- Region: East Midlands
- Country: England
- Sovereign state: United Kingdom
- Post town: CHESTERFIELD
- Postcode district: S42
- Dialling code: 01246
- Police: Derbyshire
- Fire: Derbyshire
- Ambulance: East Midlands
- UK Parliament: North East Derbyshire

Tupton is a village and civil parish in North East Derbyshire, Derbyshire, England, 5 miles (8 km) south of Chesterfield. The population of the civil parish -- including Egstow and Old Tupton -- was 3,428 at the 2011 Census . It lies just north of Clay Cross on the A61 (Derby Road) which runs from Chesterfield to Alfreton. It comprises the areas of Old Tupton and New Tupton. However, it is generally referred to as Tupton. A similarly named area, Tapton, is a few miles away, part of Chesterfield.

The village has a primary school, and a secondary school with a sixth form. Tupton also has two general stores, a post office, hair dresser, tanning studio, building supplies, tyre services, multiple garages, car repair centres, preschool nursery, three pubs, one club, a fish and chip shop, a nursing home, a coffee house and a pharmacy. There is a Methodist church near the A61 and St John's Church of England Church and Hall on Queen Victoria Road, opposite the Primary School. The church building is late nineteenth century with a modern interior and is part of the North Wingfield Team Parish. Tupton Ivanhoe FC and Tupton RFC are the leading sports clubs. A footpath runs alongside the rugby club pitches to the Avenue Washlands Nature Reserve.

Other settlements near the village are Wingerworth, Grassmoor and North Wingfield.

A carnival called the Tupton Carnival is a yearly event held on a Saturday in July. This was first started in 2003 and has grown in size and attendance as the years have gone by. A young lady is elected Carnival Queen and travels through the village attended by the carnival princes and princesses and is followed by a procession of floats, bands, and fancy dress participants. The parade ends on the Primary school field for an afternoon of fun and live music, with stalls, displays, and various competitions.

Tupton has also seen new development around Ankerbold Road, which runs on the outer edge of the village, close to North Wingfield. A large modern housing estate has been built around the Pond Lane proximity, as well as recent housing to the south. Tupton also has the Midland Main Line passing straight through it. At the bottom of Station New Road, there is a bridge crossing over the track into North Wingfield; this was the location of Clay Cross railway station.

It is also known that Tupton has been a settlement since Anglo-Saxon times, as the historic Ryknield Street runs directly through the village. The locality was formerly known as "Topetune" and "Tuphome." Tupton is shown on the C. Smith New Map of Great Britain and Ireland in 1806 and on the first Ordnance Survey maps, Tupton Moor, Tupton Over Wood and Tupton Hall are shown.

== Bombing raid of 1941 ==
The area known as 'the Rec' once held a lido, or open-air swimming pool, the remains of which can still be seen in the stream. During the Second World War, several houses in Tupton were bombed by fleeing German aircraft. Some of these houses were on Ward Street and others in demolished areas where the Community Garden is now located. It is known 11 people died in the raid on the morning of 15 March 1941. Despite local rumours, a large crater in the nearby woods, nicknamed "Monkey Hollow", was not caused by a bomb dropped during this raid. In fact it used to be the location of an air raid shelter for Clay Cross Works. Once the war was over, the shelter was demolished and the crater left unfilled.

== People from Tupton ==
- Dennis Skinner (born 1932), coal miner and M.P. for Bolsover 1970 to 2019, attended Tupton Hall School

=== Sport ===
- Jim Hutchinson (1896–2000), who 256 played first-class cricket games for Derbyshire and lived to the age of 103
- Guy Jackson (1896–1966), cricketer who played 280 first-class cricket games for Derbyshire
- Geoff Martin (1940–2021), footballer who played over 280 games including 144 for Workington A.F.C.
- John Lowe (born 21 July 1945), professional darts player, was born in Tupton
- Tony Holyoake (born 28 January 1946), professional darts player, was born locally, now lives in Calgary

== See also ==
- Listed buildings in Tupton
- List of places in Derbyshire
- New Tupton United F.C.
