= Clay Cross Zingari F.C. =

English football club

Clay Cross Zingari
- Full name: Clay Cross Zingari Football Club

Clay Cross Zingari F.C. was an English football club, based in Clay Cross, Derbyshire.

== History ==
The club competed in the FA Cup twice before merging with Clay Cross Works in 1909 to form Clay Cross Town F.C., but another club by the same name was found competing in the FA Cup during the 1920s.

== Records ==
- FA Cup
  - Preliminary round – 1922–23
