= Clay Cross Town F.C. (1909) =

English football club

Clay Cross Town
- Full name: Clay Cross Town Football Club
- Founded: 1909

Clay Cross Town F.C. was the name of an English football club based in Clay Cross, Derbyshire.

== History ==
The club was formed in 1909 as the result of a merger between Clay Cross Zingari F.C. and Clay Cross Works F.C. They competed in the FA Cup on six occasions.

They were the second of three prominent clubs to take the name of Clay Cross Town, the first was formed in the 1870s and dissolved in 1896, and the third was formed in 1993.

=== Records ===
- FA Cup
  - 3rd qualifying round – 1910–11
