= North Wingfield =

Village and parish in Derbyshire, England

Coordinates: 53.182°N 1.387°W

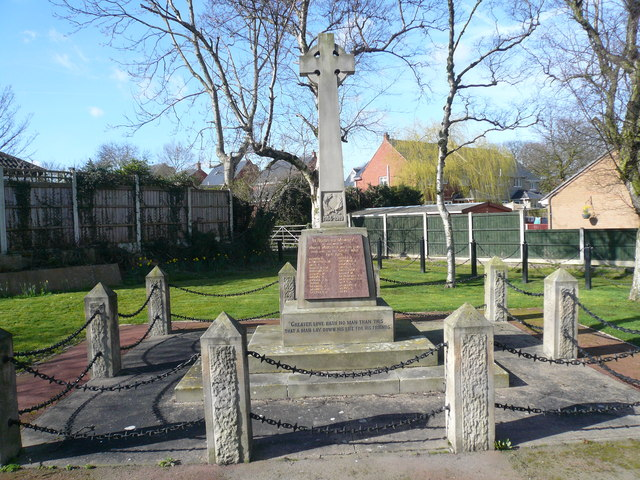
- War memorial

- Location within Derbyshire
- Population: 6,505 (2011)
- OS grid reference: SK409651
- Civil parish: North Wingfield
- District: North East Derbyshire
- Shire county: Derbyshire
- Region: East Midlands
- Country: England
- Sovereign state: United Kingdom
- Post town: CHESTERFIELD
- Postcode district: S42
- Dialling code: 01246
- Police: Derbyshire
- Fire: Derbyshire
- Ambulance: East Midlands
- UK Parliament: North East Derbyshire

North Wingfield is a large village and civil parish in the North East Derbyshire district in the county of Derbyshire, England. Located approximately 4 1/2 mi (7.2 km) south-east of Chesterfield, and 1 mi (1.6 km) north-east of Clay Cross. The population of the civil parish as of the 2022 census was 5,885. The A6175 road from the M1 motorway to the A61 road runs through the village.

The village contains the former hamlets of Hepthorne Lane, Hillyfields, Highfields and Church Hill. The Hepthorne Lane area is still called by its name by local residents, as are the Highfields and Church Hill areas. The River Rother flows through the village at the bottom of Hepthorne Lane, next to the Midland Main Line.

== Brief history ==
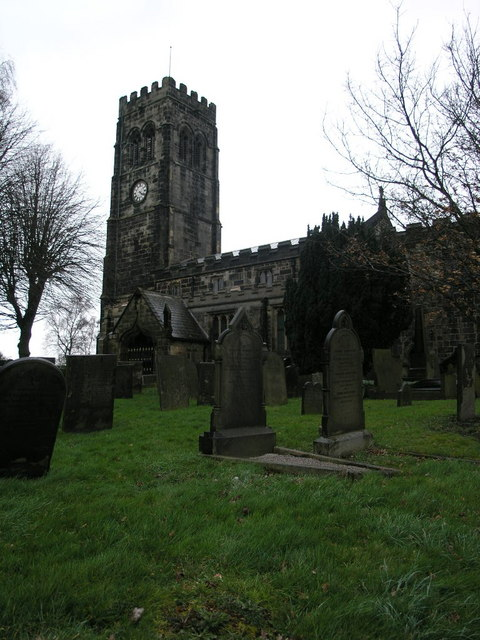
St Lawrence's Church, North Wingfield

During the Domesday Survey in 1086 the manor of North Wingfield was recorded as Winnefelt. It was noted that there was a church and a priest. Parts of the current church, dedicated to St. Lawrence, date from the Norman era, with some features being Anglo-Saxon in origin.

At that time the manor of North Wingfield was in the possession of Walter De Ayncourt. The name eventually became shortened to Deincourt, which was used by the village's secondary school, Deincourt Community School from 1953 until it closed in 2010.

Both North Wingfield and South Wingfield have forms of the same place-name, formed from "winn" (pasture) and "feld" (open land). The earlier forms of each are not distinguished but in 1284 a Middle English form of South Wingfield occurs. (North) Wingfield is found in Anglo-Saxon records, while the records of (South) Wingfield begin with the Domesday Book.

== The village ==
Located in the former coalfields, the village was served by several collieries for most of its recent history. Now, partly due to its location near to the M1 motorway and its school, the village has experienced an influx of residents in recent years, and many housing developments have taken place.

The village now only has a primary school, following the closure of Deincourt Community School.

Scouts

The village has a dedicated Scout hut, home of 1st North Wingfield Scout group, providing fun and adventure to young people age 4 to 18

== Schools ==
There was a secondary school in North Wingfield – Deincourt Community School - from 1953 to 2010. In November 2007, Ofsted placed Deincourt Community School under 'special measures', due to inspectors' concerns about falling standards at the school. This gave Derbyshire County Council the opportunity to implement plans to close the school, which, with only 473 students at that time, they felt to be too small to be viable. The proposal was to transfer the students to Tibshelf School, which would be re-built on a new larger site under the Building Schools for the Future scheme. This school building scheme was scrapped by Educational Minister Michael Gove when a Conservative-led coalition Government was elected in 2010. Between 2008 and 2010, Deincourt School was in a ‘federation', that is to say a loose merger, with Tibshelf School. Despite the cancellation of the Building Schools for the Future Scheme, and the fact that in its 2009 Inspection report the school was rated as a ‘Good’ School, the process of closing the school was continued. The school therefore closed in July 2010, and was integrated into Tibshelf School. Because of the lack of space at Tibshelf School, students continued to be taught at the Deincourt Site in North Wingfield until June 2012. Because of the overcrowding caused by the merger with the already overcrowded Tibshelf school, Derbyshire County Council itself funded a new build school in Tibshelf, which opened in November 2013.

North Wingfield Primary School was founded in Victorian times; it was formerly an infant and junior school on a split site. The original Victorian building has now been demolished and a new school has been built on the old Deincourt site.

== Neighbouring settlements ==
Neighbouring settlements are Tupton, Grassmoor, Holmewood, Pilsley, Danesmoor and Clay Cross. North Wingfield is quite a distance away from its counterpart South Wingfield, which is around 11 miles southwards.

== Facilities ==
- Pharmacy
- Two GP surgeries
- Newsagents
- Post office
- Midlands Co-operative Society supermarket
- Sure Start centre
- Community Resource Centre
- Various locally-run shops
- Recycling facilities
- Petrol Station

== Notable people ==
- Henry Hicken (1882–1964), trade unionist, elected as checkweighman and secretary of the local lodge of the Derbyshire Miners' Association
- Harry Hopkinson (1902–1979), yodeler, music hall performer, soprano and songwriter.
- George Eason (1930–1999), Professor of Mathematics at Strathclyde University from 1970 to 1983; he worked on the dynamical theory of elasticity, raised locally

== See also ==
- Listed buildings in North Wingfield
- List of places in Derbyshire
