= Clay Cross =

Town in Derbyshire, England

Coordinates: 53.1637°N 1.4128°W

- Town and civil parish
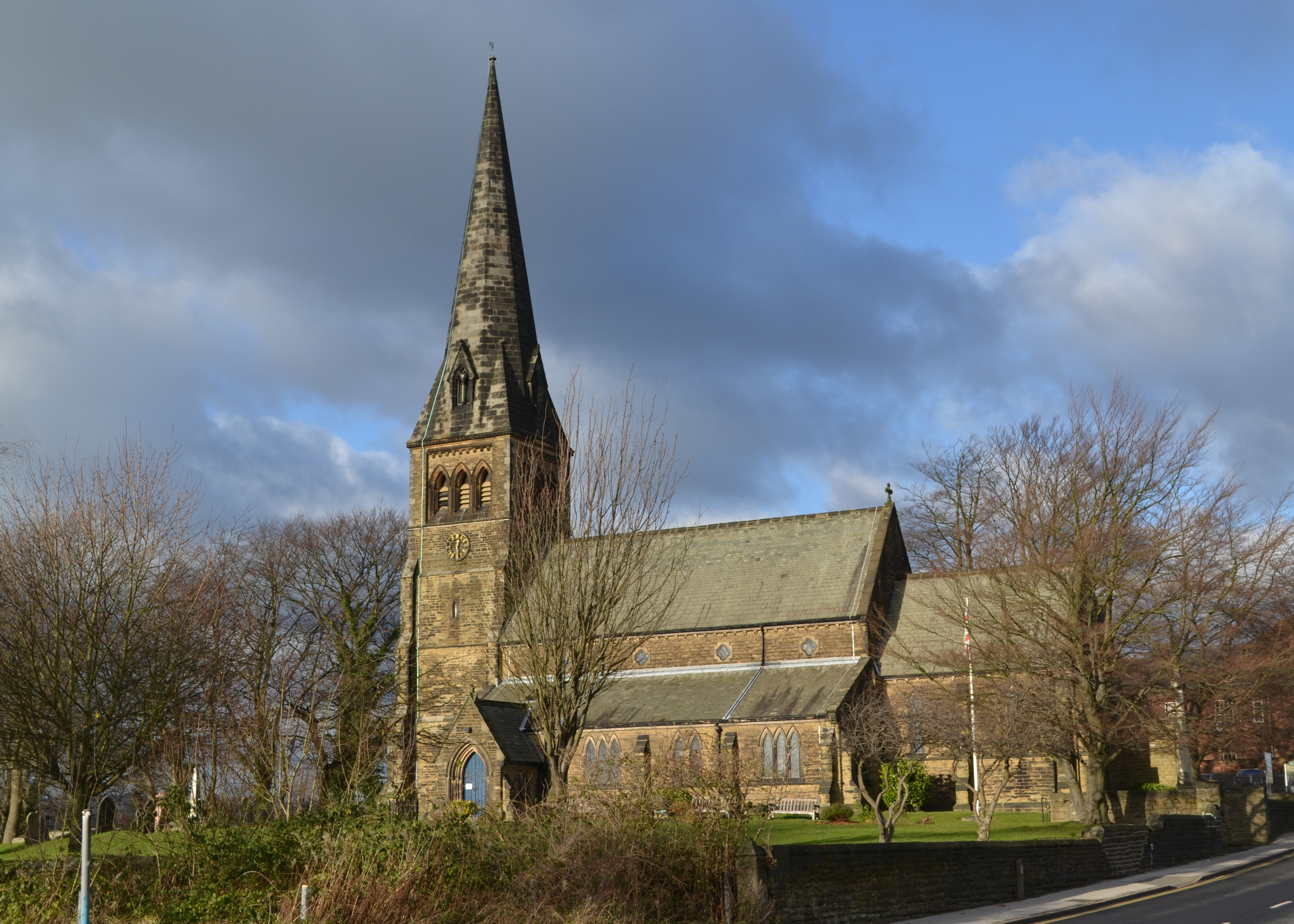
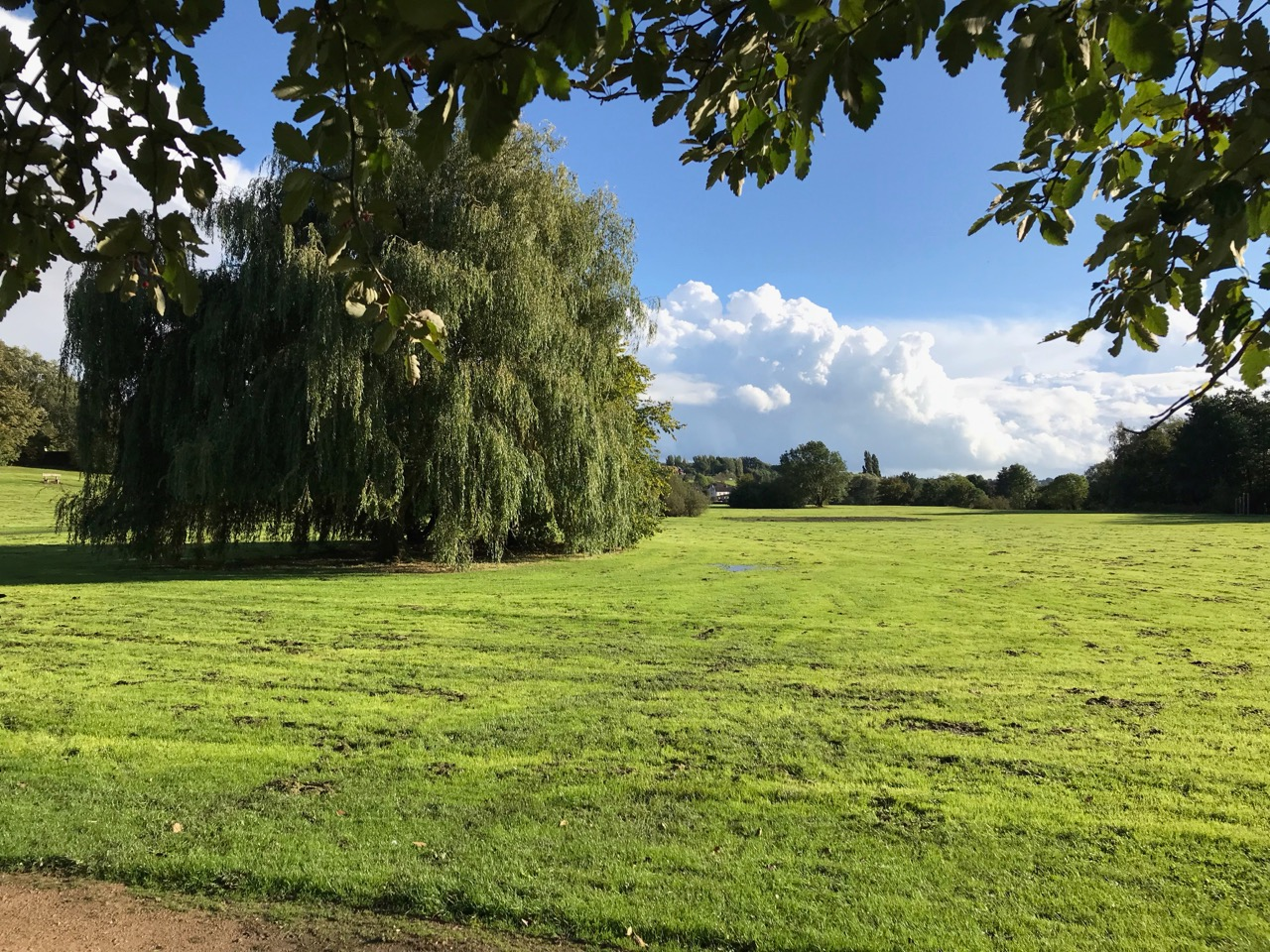
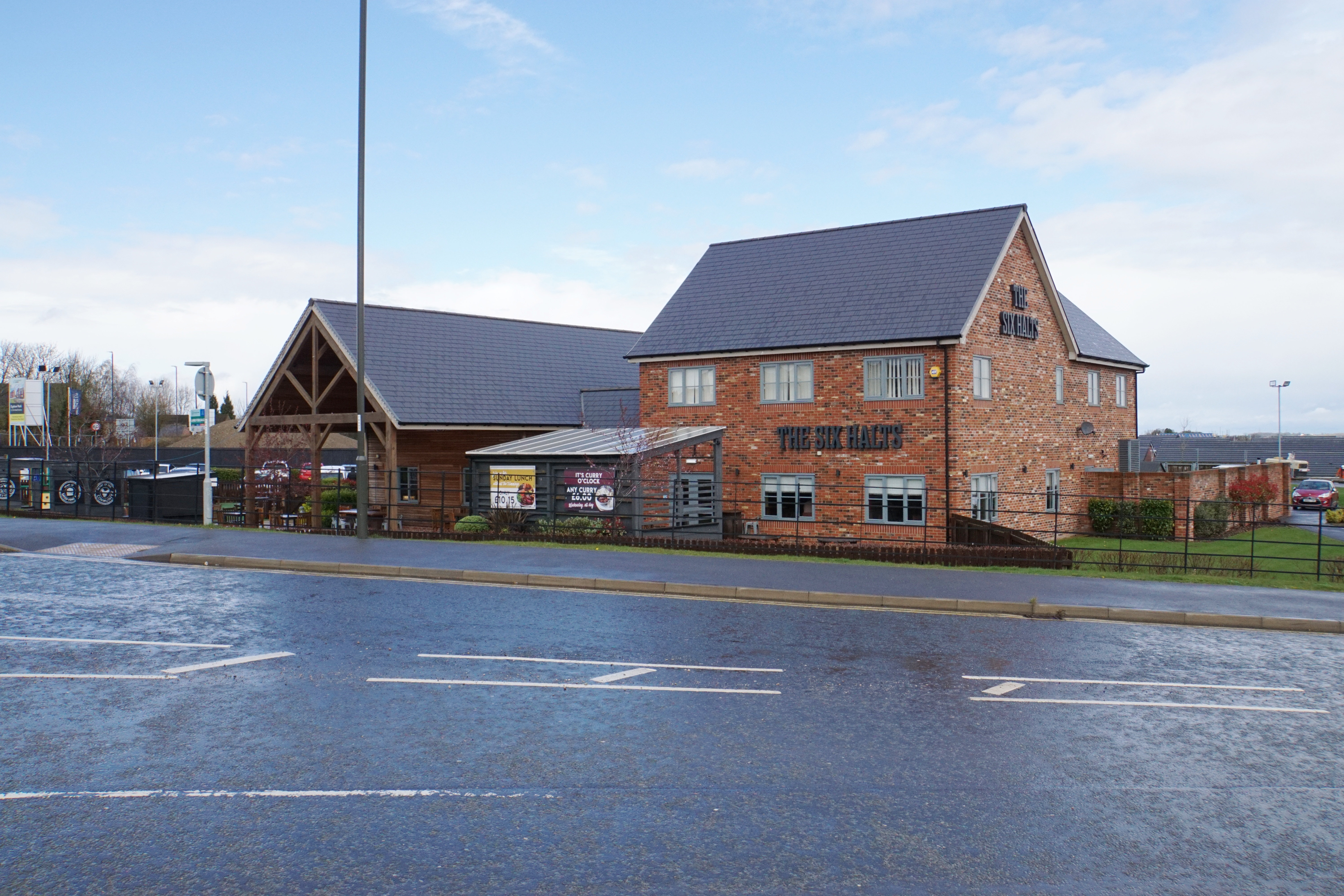
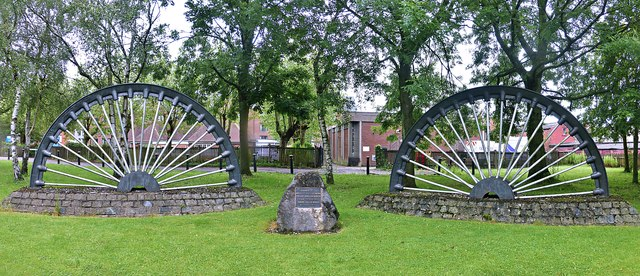
- St Bartholomew's Church Kenning Park Six Halts Colliery Wheels

- Clay Cross parish highlighted within Derbyshire
- Population: 9,222 (civil parish, 2011)
- OS grid reference: SK392631
- Civil parish: Clay Cross
- District: North East Derbyshire
- Shire county: Derbyshire
- Region: East Midlands
- Country: England
- Sovereign state: United Kingdom
- Post town: CHESTERFIELD
- Postcode district: S45
- Dialling code: 01246
- Police: Derbyshire
- Fire: Derbyshire
- Ambulance: East Midlands
- UK Parliament: North East Derbyshire

Clay Cross is a town and a civil parish in the North East Derbyshire district of Derbyshire, England. It is a former industrial and mining town, about 5 miles (8.0 km) south of Chesterfield. It is directly on the A61. Surrounding settlements include North Wingfield, Tupton, Pilsley and Ashover.

== History ==
The High Street was built over a pre-dating Roman road, that may have been called Rykneild Street, where a tollhouse (1786–1876) was situated. The discovery of coal in the area introduced the village to the Industrial Revolution. Packhorses at first transported the 'blackgold' over the Peaks on a turnpike road opened in 1756 between the iron foundries of Derby and Sheffield. Until the early 19th century, Clay Cross was a small village known as Clay Lane, but increasing demand for coal and other minerals trebled the population by 1840, the oldest building being the George and Dragon Inn. While driving the tunnel for the North Midland Railway, George Stephenson discovered both coal and iron, which together with the demand for limestone, caused him to move into Tapton Hall, near Chesterfield, and set up business as George Stephenson and Co.

A map of 1833 showed Thanet Street and Clay Lane. The railway 'mania' of 1840s witnessed expansion northwards facilitated by the Clay Cross tunnel dug in 1837–38. Whilst tunnelling over a mile underground they discovered vast quantities of commercial grade coal. Clay Cross became a boom town. The 'Liverpool Party' of Stephenson engineers formed the Clay Cross Company in 1839 which they funded from their considerable resources. As well as sinking a number of shafts with colliery support, there were coke oven works, brickworks, limeworks, irons furnaces and foundry. The ductile pipe was developed into an internationally sold product, making Clay Cross renowned for its iron and coal industry worldwide. Although the company had been formed to mine coal and manufacture coke from the railway, the supplies from Durham were preferred, and the works turned to iron working and brick making. When Stephenson died in 1848 his son, Robert, took over, leaving the company in 1852 when it became formally known by the name of the Clay Cross Company. In 1871 the Jackson family acquired 100% of the stocks and shares. They continued as owners until 1974. For many years, the company was the town's major employer. In 1985 Biwater took it over. In December 2000 Biwater sold the site to French company, Saint-Gobain. Some months later, it was closed down with the loss of around 750 jobs. Demolition of the vast Biwater site began in late 2008, and new houses and shops are appearing in the town.

In 1925 the Ashover Light Railway was opened to transport minerals from the quarries at Ashover Butts to the Clay Cross Company at Egstow. The passenger services on the narrow gauge line were closed in 1936 and the mineral traffic ceased in 1950.

=== Industrial architecture ===
Eldon House

In 1840 the Stephensons built Eldon House as its office headquarters, which latterly was converted into a private dwelling-house. The Stephensons also built more than 400 miners' cottages. In addition they set up elementary schools and consecrated new churches. The company provided the town with almost all its energy needs in gas and electricity.

Clay Cross Hall

The largest house Clay Cross Hall was built in 1845 for the company's General Manager Charles Binns. Stephenson's workers' houses were of high quality for their time, having four rooms compared to the normal two. By 1850, there were three chapels, a church and an institute - but no constable. One such construction of 1847 was the Wesleyan Chapel in use until at least 1900 on Holmgate Road. They also provided a company bowling green with a clubhouse. A Mechanics Institute was opened which was handed over to the Clay Lane Urban Districts School Board in 1893. The Board's Senior School for Boys was opened in 1884, converted to a junior school in the 1930s and still teaches in 2015. During the late Victorian era middle class villa style houses were also built in a new part of the town.

Colliery owner Thomas Houldsworth, also a churchwarden for 25 years, built Alma House which stood in extensive parklands. The house was surrounded by railings and flat roof of indeterminate date. He was responsible developer of Clay Cross pits until 1850, and then the Alma Colliery in North Wingfield, after the Crimean War.

Springfield House was built by the Clay Cross Company for engineer William Howe by the company. He was the resident from 1866 until his death in 1872. An even earlier event was Hill House built by 1833 it was purchased by the North Midland Railway Company in 1837 as an office for resident engineer Frederick Swanwick.

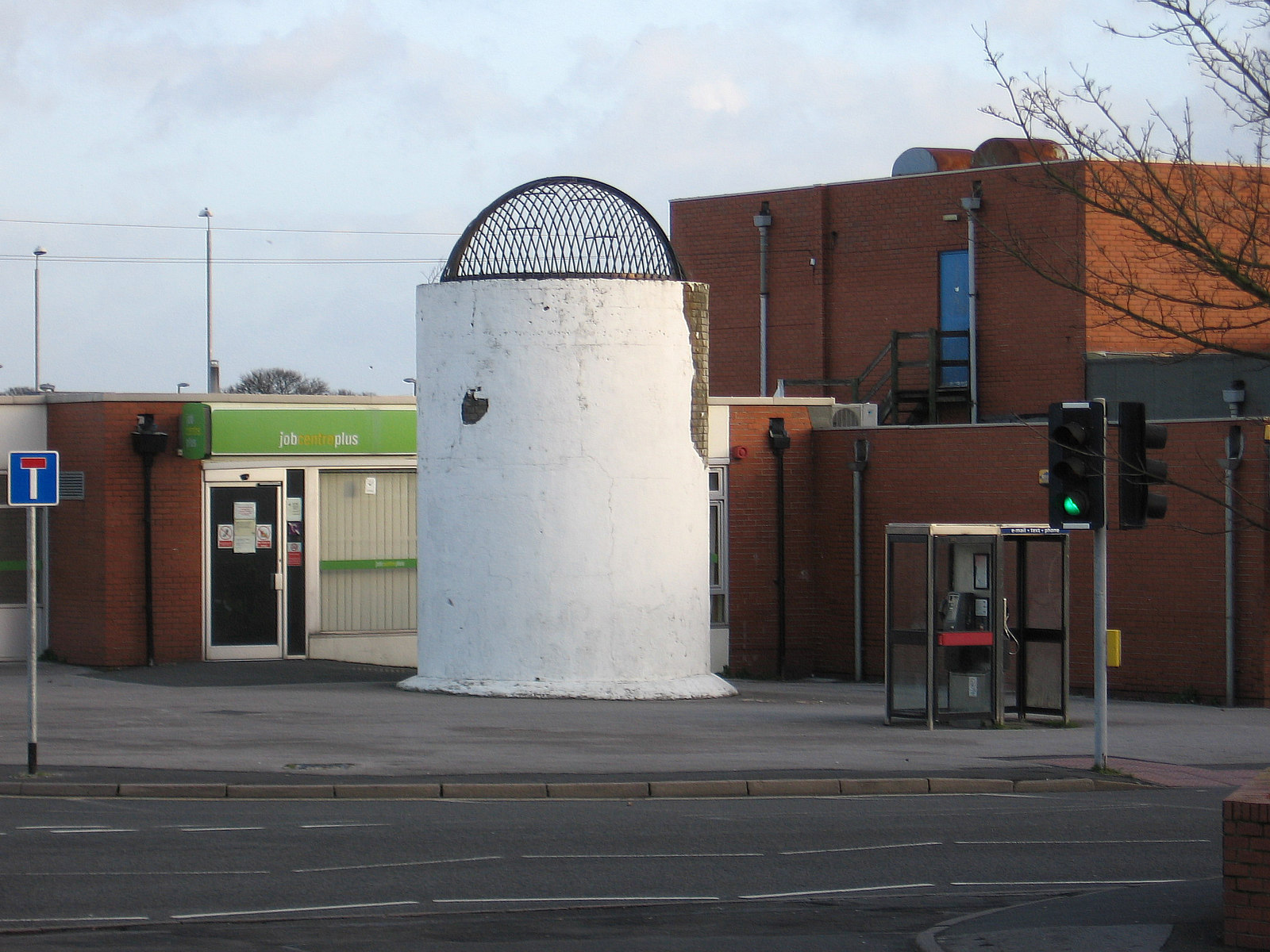
Clay Cross Tunnel vent next to Job Centre in Market Street

When the tunnel was completed, Swanwick left town, but the house was passed to engineers James Campbell and William Howe, and by the 1860s, Dr. Wilson, the local medical practitioner was in residence.

The North Midland Railway tunnel sank nine ventilator shafts through which smoke wafted across the Peaks. Clay Cross is situated at the highest point on the line 361 feet above sea level, when it opened in 1840. A narrow gauge line transported coal up the incline to the works. Another mile north along the 'Black Path' was Clay Cross railway station, between the halts at Tupton and Hepthorne Lane.

=== Religion ===
St Bartholomew's Church

The Anglican church of St Bartholomew had been built and consecrated in 1851. Six years later a spire was added. The Rev. Joseph Oldham and his wife, Emma were the first conscientious incumbents. Her brother was radical designer and founder of the Arts and Crafts movement, William Morris. Morris was commissioned to install a saintly stained glass window.

Other places of worship in Clay Cross are:

- Methodist Church on High Street.
- Baptist Church on Market Street (now closed).
- Clay Cross Community Church - C4 (Assemblies of God) on Market Street.
- Roman Catholic Church of St. Patrick and St. Bridget on Thanet Street.
- Holmgate Evangelical Church on Valley Road, Holmgate.
- Salvation Army on Thanet Street.
- St Barnabas Church, an Anglican congregation meeting at the St Barnabas Centre on Pilsley Road, Danesmoor.
- Community of Christ on Thanet Street.

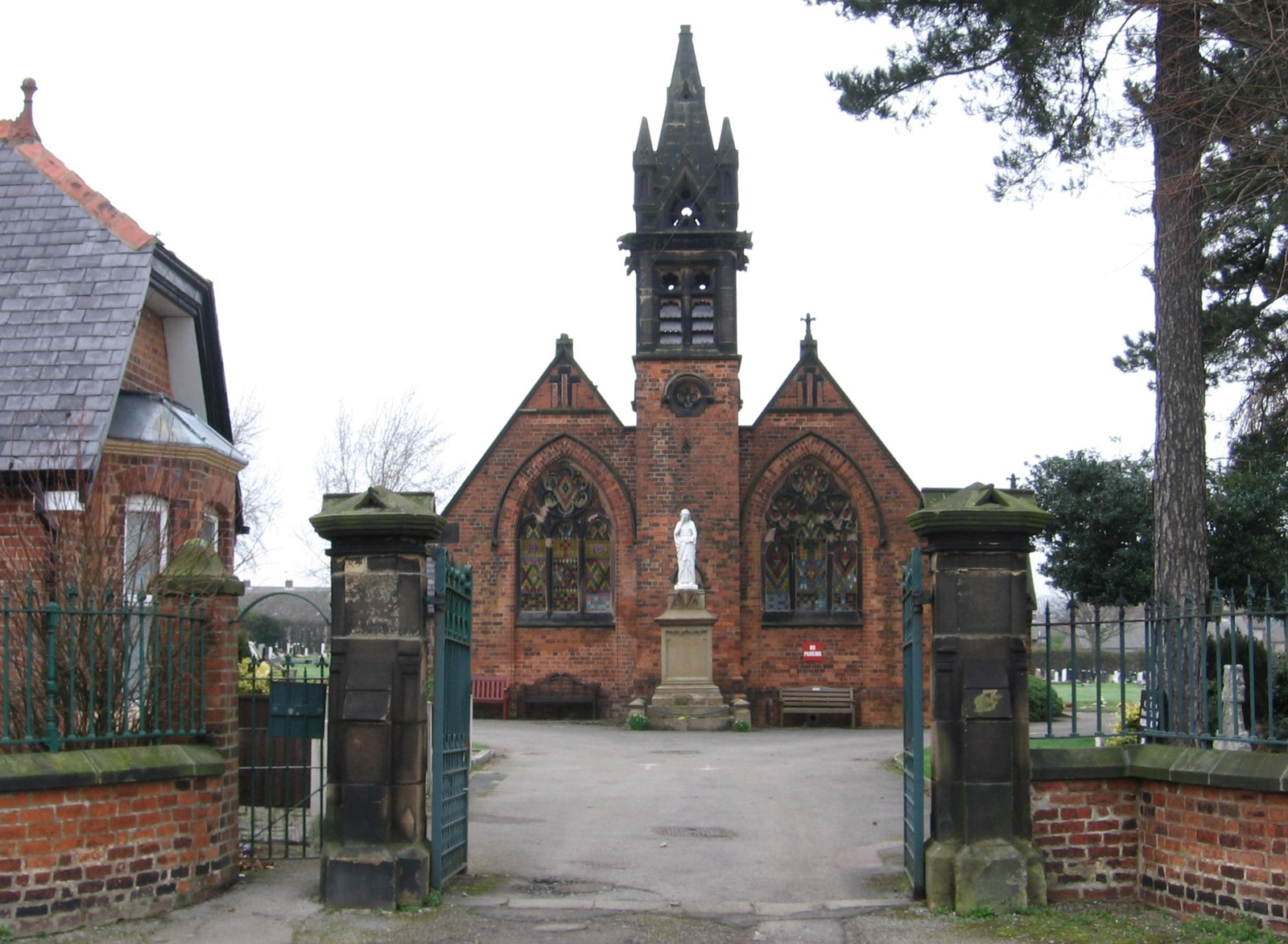
Danesmoor Cemetery Chapel and Parkhouse Memorial

=== Danesmoor Cemetery and Parkhouse Memorial ===
Parkhouse Colliery Memorial in Danesmoor Cemetery stands today as testament to a disaster. In November 1882 an underground explosion brought the collapse of the pit shaft causing the death of 45 men and boys. Many of their families lived in company housing at Pleasant Row, Chapel Row, Cellar Row and Gaffers Row. Also known as Egstow Terrace, this last street was built in 1846, was considered of better average quality housing.

=== Co-operative ===
Former Co-operative shop on High Street

The Clay Cross Pioneer Industrial Co-operative Society's first shop was opened on the corner of the High Street and Market Street. It was an early member of the Co-operative Movement founded in Rochdale by John Bright that spread rapidly across the North of England. The Co-operative Society archives say that the Clay Cross Pioneer Industrial Society merged with the Chesterfield & District Co-operative Society in 1915.

== Rents rebellion ==
The town formed the Clay Cross Urban District from 1894. In the 1970s, the Clay Cross Urban District Council (CCUDC) achieved brief notoriety due to its refusal to implement the Housing Finance Act 1972 in increasing the rents of council housing: by law the rents should have increased by £1 a week from October 1972. The council was one of several to show defiance against the Act and of three to be ordered to comply by the Department of the Environment in November 1972 (the others being Eccles and Halstead). CCUDC was threatened with an audit in December 1972. The constituency Labour party barred the eleven councillors from its list of approved candidates. The District Auditor ordered the eleven Labour Party councillors to pay a surcharge of £635 each in January 1973, finding them 'guilty of negligence and misconduct'. Conisbrough Urban District Council faced a similar audit on 19 January 1973.

CCUDC made an appeal in the case to the High Court. Clydebank and Cumbernauld abandoned similar actions in March 1973. The surcharge was upheld by the High Court on 30 July 1973, which also added a further £2,000 legal costs to their bill, as well as barring them from public office for five years. The council further defied authority (the Pay Board) in August, when they decided to increase council workers' earnings. This provoked a further dispute with NALGO. Ultimately, the dispute became moot with the replacement of Clay Cross Urban District Council with the North East Derbyshire District Council from 1 April 1974. The councillors were made bankrupt in 1975.

A book on the dispute between the council and the government, The Story of Clay Cross, was written by one of the councillors, David Skinner, the younger brother of Bolsover MP Dennis Skinner, and the journalist Julia Langdon. The book was published by Spokesman Books in 1974.

== Local economy and transport ==
Clay Cross has a large modern business park called Coney Green Business Park and is located between Egstow and Danesmoor. There is a community hospital on the A6175 Market Street. Danesmoor Industrial Estate close to the former site of the Parkhouse Colliery. The town's library is on Holmgate Road. Clay Cross town centre is currently undergoing a £22m redevelopment which has so far included a new supermarket, new bus station and new relief road. The second phase of this is due to start which will see a new parade of shops plus a new medical centre. Eventually the site of the former junior and infant schools which is located in the town centre will be redeveloped.

M1 motorway junction 29 is five miles away. The nearest railway stations are Chesterfield (6 miles) and Alfreton. Clay Cross station closed as part of the Beeching cuts in 1967. In 2017, a Stagecoach in Chesterfield bus connecting Clay Cross to Chesterfield railway station was introduced. A passenger railway line runs in a tunnel under the town without stopping.

There has been talk of providing a motorway spur to the town in the past. To ease chronic congestion on the A61, which has seen traffic grow by 10% in the past few years, there is talk of a dual carriageway bypassing Clay Cross and Tupton before joining the A617 near Hasland, heading North West to Horns Bridge.

== Education ==
Tupton Hall School is in Tupton and located about one mile to the north of Clay Cross. Previously Clay Cross had a secondary school located in Market Street, and a junior school located off High Street. The junior and infant schools were merged and moved to a new purpose-built complex on Pilsley Road Danesmoor and renamed Sharley Park Community Primary School. The site of the former schools has been cleared and is awaiting development. The secondary school was closed in 1969 and transferred to Tupton Hall as part of the Government's drive to comprehensive education, it is now one of the largest with around 2,000 pupils, including a sixth form centre. Clay Cross Secondary School was converted to an adult education centre.

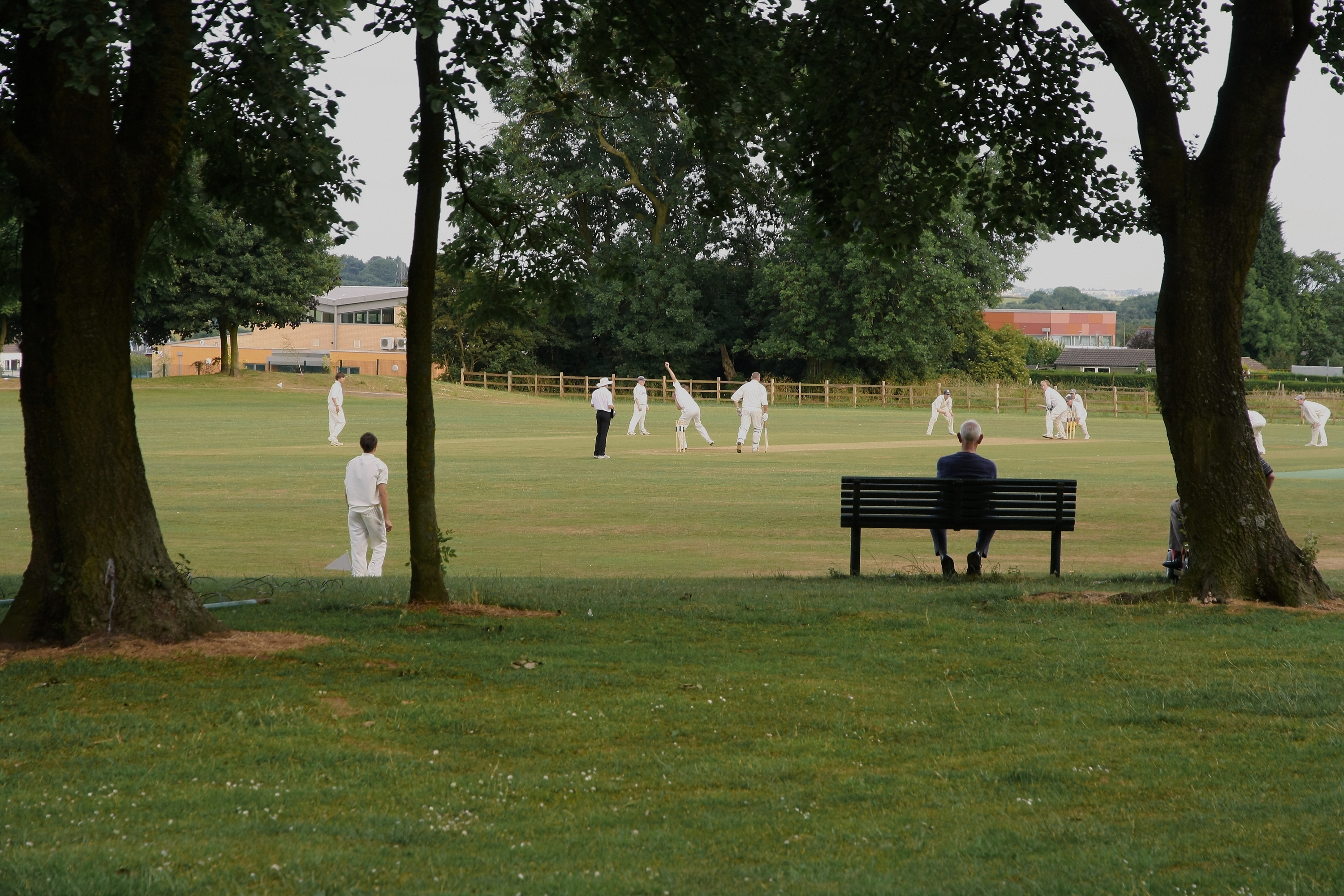
Clay Cross cricket ground

== Media ==
Local TV coverage is provided by BBC Yorkshire and ITV Yorkshire. Television signals are received from the Emley Moor TV transmitter,BBC East Midlands and ITV Central can also be received from the Waltham TV transmitter.

The town is served by both BBC Radio Sheffield and BBC Radio Derby. Other radio stations including Greatest Hits Radio North Derbyshire, and Chesterfield Radio, a community based radio station that broadcast from Chesterfield.

The Derbyshire Times is the weekly local newspaper that serves the town.

== Sport ==
=== Leisure centre ===
Sharley Park Leisure Centre, on the A6175, Market Street, has swimming, gym and sports hall facilities.

=== Football ===
Five football clubs from the town, all now extinct, have competed in the FA Cup over the years -

- Clay Cross Town F.C. (1874)
- Clay Cross Zingari F.C.
- Clay Cross Town F.C. (1909)
- Clay Cross & Danesmoor Welfare F.C.
- Biwater F.C. (formerly Clay Cross Works F.C.)

The town's current team, the third to be called Clay Cross Town, play in the Central Midlands Football League, and played in the FA Vase for the first time in 2016.

=== Chess ===
Clay Cross Chess Club was formed in Autumn 1977. At the height of chess club popularity in the 1980s and 1990s CCCC had about 50 active members and could field 5 or 6 teams each week, playing in various divisional league and cup tournaments organised by the Sheffield & District and Derbyshire Chess Associations as well as the now-defunct North Midland Chess League. For several years in the 1980s the club ran annual Chess Congresses (Tournaments) on May Day, financially supported by the Trades Council, and attracting players from across the North and Midlands, at venues such as The Winding Wheel and Rose Hill. On one occasion the main feature was a "Simultaneous" where several-times British Chess Champion Jon Speelman took on 40 local players at once! (Today: 2025) After the difficult "COVID" years Clay Cross Chess Club is gradually building again as it heads towards its half-centenary (2027), with three teams in Derbyshire and Sheffield Leagues, and meets most Tuesdays (7.15 onwards) at the Community of Christ Church, Thanet Street, Clay Cross S45 9JS.

== Demography ==
In the 2011 census, Clay Cross was 97.7% White, 1.1% Asian, 0.8% Mixed (multiple), and 0.2% Black.

== Notable residents ==
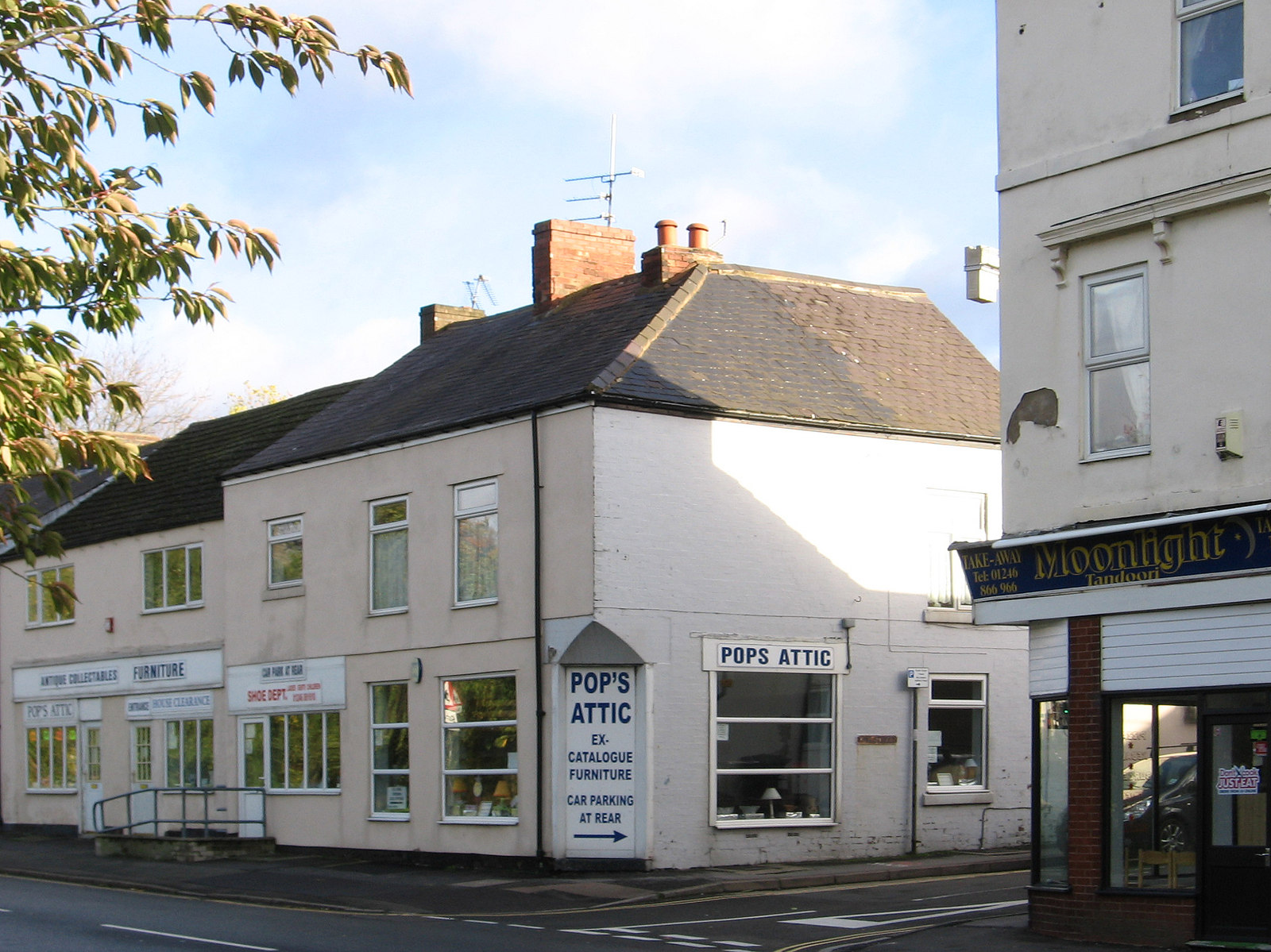
Former Kenning Hardware Shop on High Street

- Arthur Henderson (1863–1935), iron moulder and politician, Nobel Peace Prize winner in 1934, MP for Clay Cross, thrice leader of the Labour Party.
- Sir George Kenning (1880–1956) a local entrepreneur who grew the family business from a corner hardware shop to a nationwide car dealership. He was an active member of the Methodist Church in Clay Cross. He was appointed Knight Bachelor in the 1943 New Year Honours List for public services in Derbyshire.
- Sir Geoffrey Allen (1928–2023), a chemist who worked on the physics and chemistry of polymers.
- Dennis Skinner (born 1932), went to Tupton Hall Grammar School, worked at Parkhouse Colliery in 1949, a mile to the east of Clay Cross. MP for Bolsover for 49 years, from 1970 to 2019.

=== Sport ===
- Thomas Forrester (1873–1927), cricketer who played 131 first-class cricket games for Warwickshire and Derbyshire
- Thomas Armstrong (1909–2000), cricketer who played 58 first-class cricket games for Derbyshire
- Eddie Shimwell (1920–1988), footballer, who played 283 games for Blackpool, and licensee of the Royal Volunteer in Clay Cross.

== See also ==
- Listed buildings in Clay Cross
- List of places in Derbyshire
- Ashover Light Railway
- Danesmoor War Memorial

== Bibliography ==
- Heritage Clay Cross Trail leaflet, Derbyshire County Council (2015)
- Victoria County History, North Derbyshire
