= North East Derbyshire =

Coordinates: 53.20°N 1.50°W

- Non-metropolitan district
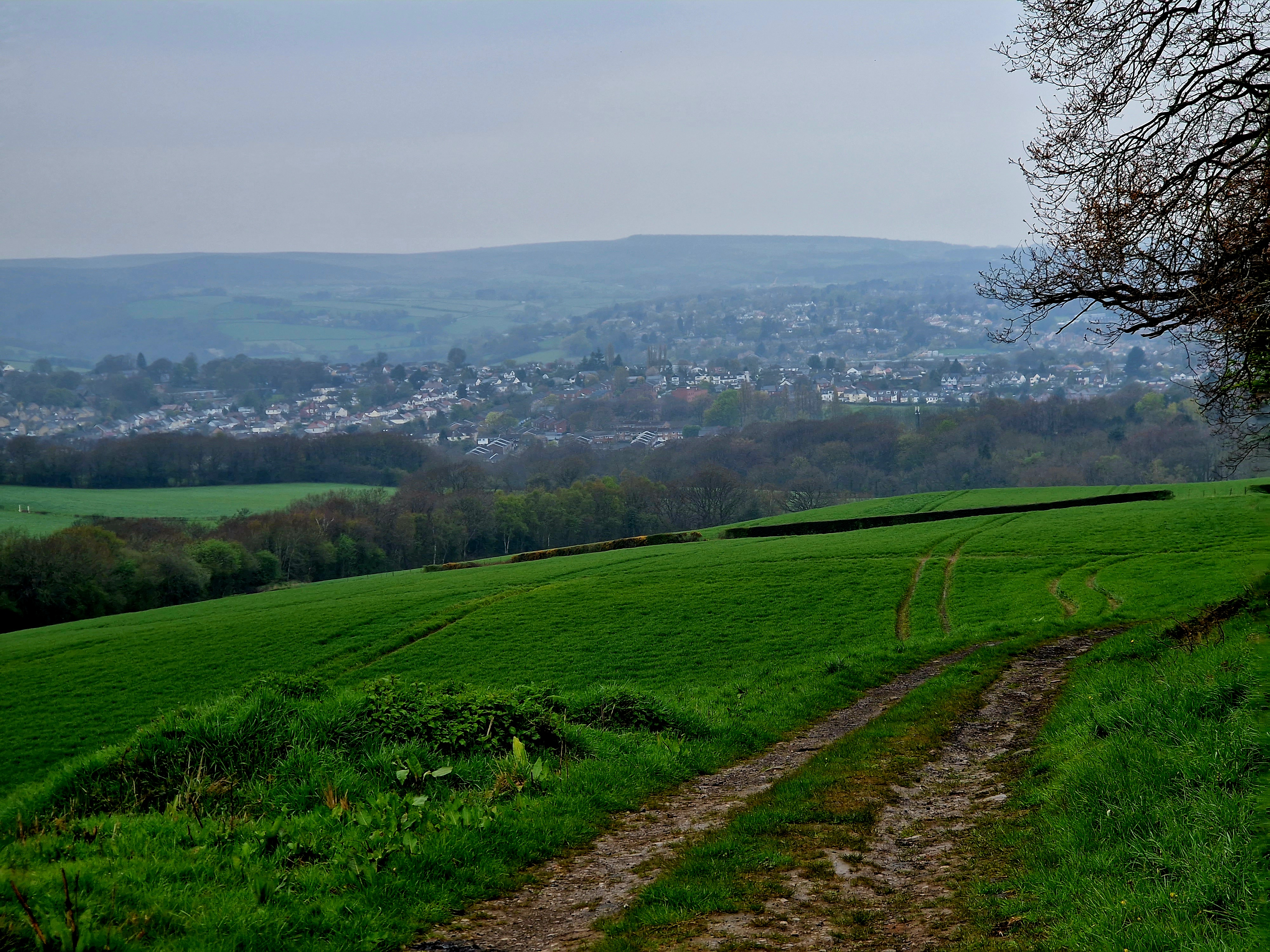
- Dronfield, the largest settlement in North East Derbyshire

- Shown within Derbyshire
- Sovereign state: United Kingdom
- Constituent country: England
- Region: East Midlands
- Ceremonial county: Derbyshire
- Admin. HQ: Wingerworth

Government
  - Type: North East Derbyshire District Council
  - MPs: Louise Sandher-Jones, Natalie Fleet

Area
  - Total: 107 sq mi (276 km^{2})
  - Rank: 128th

Population (2025)
  - Total: 107,888
  - Rank: Ranked 228th
  - Density: 1,010/sq mi (391/km^{2})

Ethnicity (2021)
  - Ethnic groups: List: 97.4% White; 1.1% Mixed; 0.9% Asian; 0.3% Black; 0.3% other

Religion (2021)
  - Religion: List: 53.9% Christianity; 44.8% no religion; 1% other; 0.3% Islam
- Time zone: UTC+0 (Greenwich Mean Time)
  - Summer (DST): UTC+1 (British Summer Time)
- Postcode: DE, S
- ONS code: 17UJ (ONS); E07000038 (GSS)
- Ethnicity: 95.7% White

North East Derbyshire is a local government district in Derbyshire, England. The council is based in the large village of Wingerworth. The district also includes the towns of Dronfield and Clay Cross as well as numerous villages and surrounding rural areas.

The neighbouring districts are Chesterfield (which it almost surrounds), Bolsover, Amber Valley, Derbyshire Dales, Sheffield and Rotherham.

== History ==
The district was formed on 1 April 1974 under the Local Government Act 1972, covering the area of three former districts shown on the map to the right, which were all abolished at the same time:

1. Chesterfield Rural District (except parish of Brimington, which went to Chesterfield)
2. Clay Cross Urban District
3. Dronfield Urban District

The new district was named North East Derbyshire, reflecting its position within the wider county.

Under current local government restructuring plans it is planned that the district will be abolished in 2028, with its area forming part of a new Derbyshire North unitary authority.

== Governance ==
North East Derbyshire District Council

Type
- Type: Non-metropolitan district

Leadership
- Chair: Michael Durrant, Labour since 29 May 2026
- Leader: Nigel Barker, Labour since 22 May 2023
- Chief Executive: Lee Hickin since 2021

Structure
- Seats: 53 councillors
- Graph of the party split among 53 seats.
- Political groups: Administration (26) Labour (26) Other parties (27) Conservative (14) Reform (6) Green (1) Independent (6)

Elections
- Last election: 4 May 2023
- Next election: 6 May 2027

Meeting place
- 2013 Mill Lane, Wingerworth, Chesterfield, S42 6NG

Website
- www.ne-derbyshire.gov.uk

Map of North East Derbyshire district.

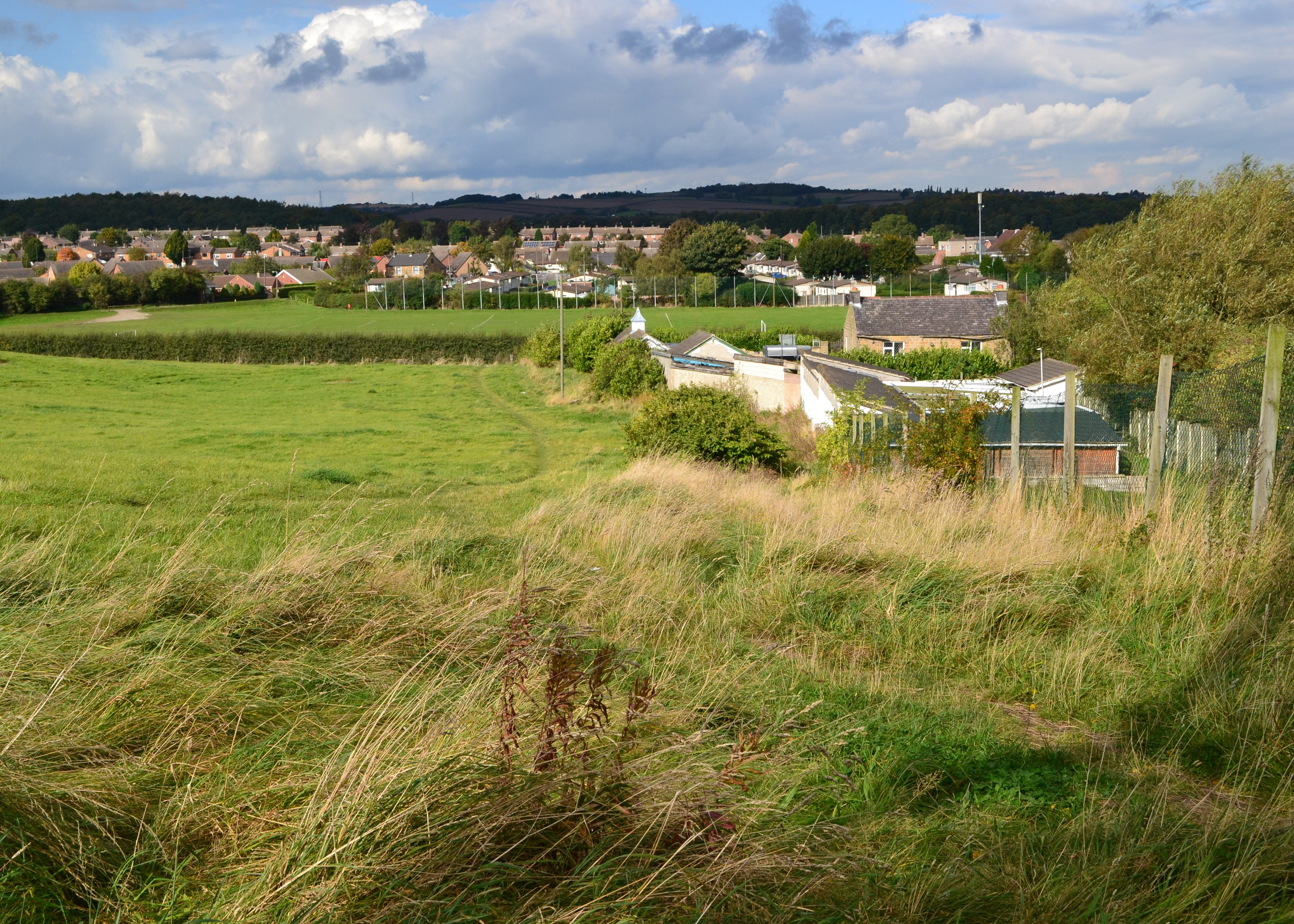
Eckington, the second largest settlement in North East Derbyshire

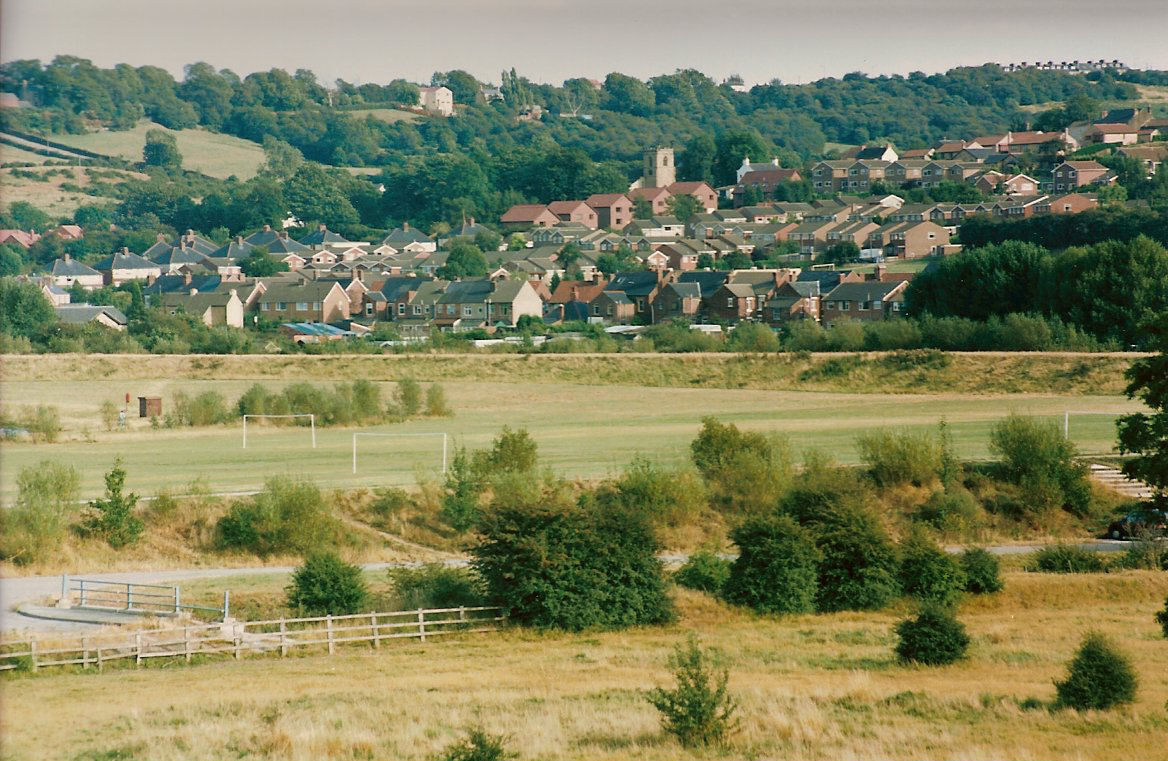
Killamarsh, the third-largest settlement in North East Derbyshire and just adjacent to the border to Sheffield.

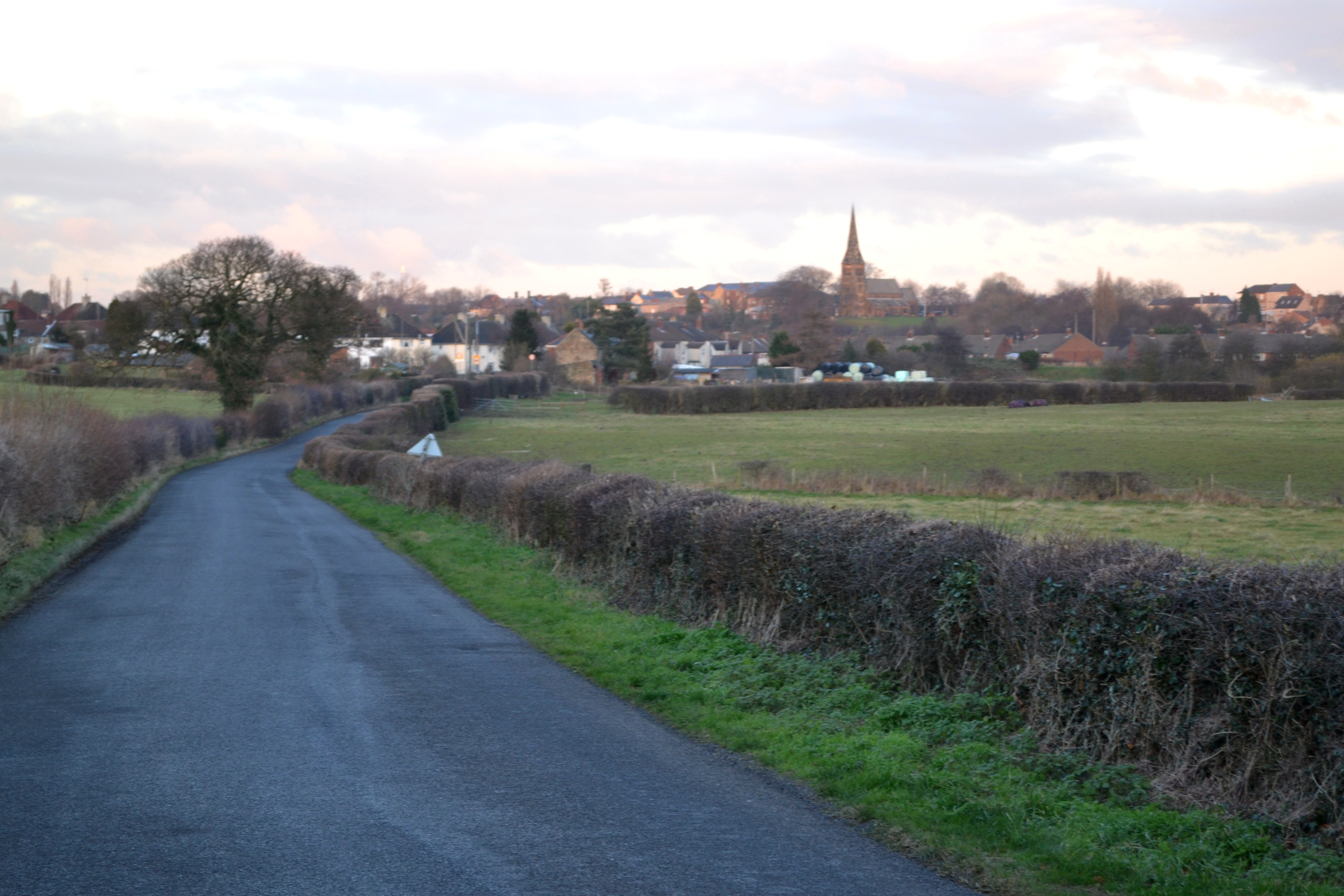
Clay Cross, the fourth-largest settlement in North East Derbyshire and close to Chesterfield

North East Derbyshire District Council provides district-level services. County-level services are provided by Derbyshire County Council. The district is also entirely covered by civil parishes, which form a third tier of local government.

Since 2014 the district has been a non-constituent member of the South Yorkshire Mayoral Combined Authority (formerly known as the Sheffield City Region); the council sends representatives to meetings of the combined authority, but the electorate of North East Derbyshire District does not vote in elections for the Mayor of South Yorkshire. The district is also part of The Derby, Derbyshire, Nottingham and Nottinghamshire Local Enterprise Partnership.

=== Political control ===
At the 2023 election, a majority of the seats on the council were won by Labour. The council subsequently went under no overall control in September 2026 when Labour lost its majority at a by-election.

The first election to the council was held in 1973, initially operating as a shadow authority alongside the outgoing authorities until the new arrangements came into effect on 1 April 1974. Political control of the council since 1974 has been as follows:

Party in control	Years
Labour	1974–1976
No overall control	1976–1979
Labour	1979–2019
Conservative	2019–2022
No overall control	2022–2023
Labour	2023–2026
No overall control	2026–present

=== Leadership ===
The leaders of the council since 2004 have been:

Councillor	Party	From	To
Graham Baxter	Labour	2004	May 2019
Martin Thacker	Conservative	20 May 2019	13 Jul 2020
Alex Dale	Conservative	13 Jul 2020	May 2023
Nigel Barker	Labour	22 May 2023	

=== Composition ===
Following the 2023 election, and subsequent changes of allegiance and by-elections up to September 2026, the composition of the council was:

Party	Councillors
Labour	26
Conservative	14
Reform	6
Green	1
Independent	6
Total	53

Four of the independent councillors sit together as the "North East Derbyshire Independents" group, and the other two independent councillors and the Green councillor together form the "Independent Group". The next election is due in 2027.

=== Elections ===
Since the last boundary changes in 2019 the council has comprised 53 councillors, representing 24 wards, with each ward electing one, two or three councillors. Elections are held every four years.

=== Premises ===
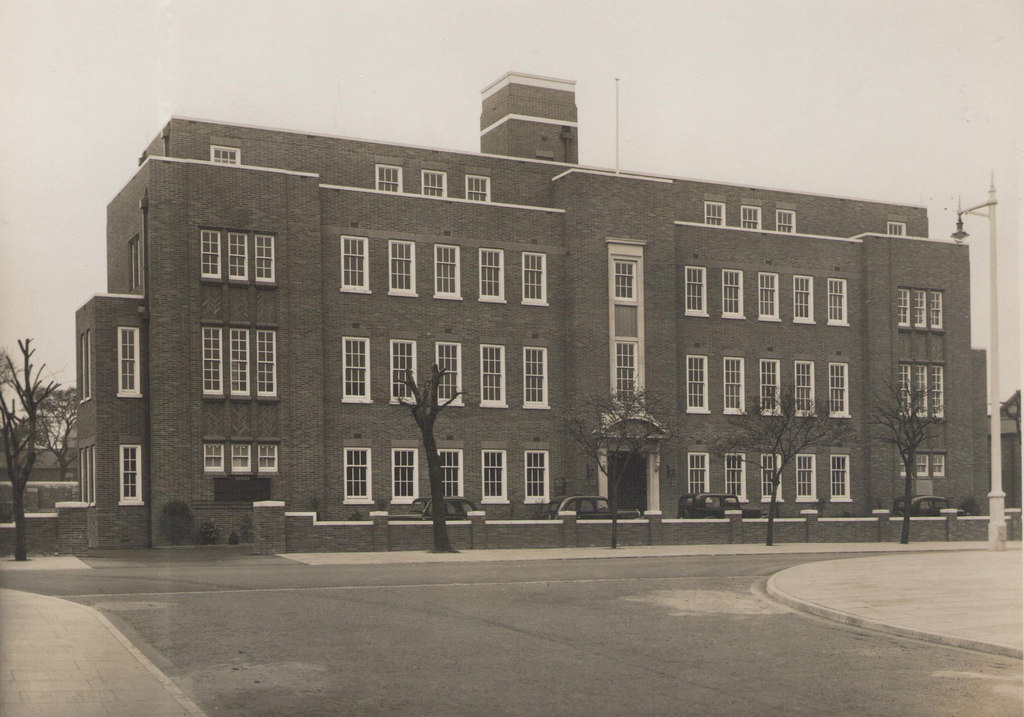
Council House, Saltergate, Chesterfield: Council's headquarters until 2015, pictured shortly after it was built in 1938.

Since 2015 the council has been based at offices on Mill Lane in Wingerworth. Prior to 2015 the council was based at the former Chesterfield Rural District Council's offices at the Council House on Saltergate in Chesterfield, outside the council's own area. The Council House had been built in 1938 and was substantially extended shortly after North East Derbyshire's creation in 1974.

== Parishes and settlements ==
The district is entirely covered by civil parishes. The parish council for Dronfield takes the style "town council".

Settlements in the district include:

- Arkwright Town and Ashover
- Barlow
- Calow and Clay Cross
- Dronfield
- Eckington
- Grassmoor
- Holmesfield, Holymoorside and Holmewood
- Killamarsh
- Morton
- North Wingfield
- Pilsley
- Renishaw and Ridgeway
- Shirland, Spinkhill and Stonebroom
- Tupton
- Wingerworth

== Coal mining ==
The district, along with the district of Bolsover and adjoining areas in South Yorkshire, was a major producer of coal; a large seam of coal was discovered during the construction of the Clay Cross Tunnel in the 1830s. Coal mining became the main industry in the region.

On nationalisation in 1947 there were 27 coal mines in the Chesterfield area, reduced to 12 by 1980. During the 1980s the Conservative government planned to close down many of the remaining mines, leading to the 1984–85 miners' strike. Members of North Derbyshire NUM were split over the strike, with a March 1984 area ballot, at the start of the strike, narrowly opposing it. It was however observed by the majority of North East Derbyshire miners, with all local pits initially closed. The strike caused massive poverty and social upheaval as traditionally close-knit communities became divided between those who worked and those who did not. The strike was resolved by the spring of 1985 and mine closures continued, with the closure of many associated industries. This decimated many local communities, with many former pit villages struggling to recover. The last Colliery in the area closed in 1993.

== Regeneration ==
Following the closure of the pits large areas of the district were derelict, with old mine workings and spoil tips from 150 years of industrialisation. Over the last few years these sites have been remediated and regenerated by open cast mining of the remaining surface deposits and reclamation of coal from the old spoil heaps. The sites have then been restored as a mix of parkland, business parks, and housing sites. The work, part-funded by EEC Coalfield community regeneration grants, helped clean up the environmental legacy and fund the creation of job opportunities by providing the infrastructure for development. This resulted in several large and some smaller business parks, now providing thousands of jobs, albeit many in warehousing and distribution, not of the same skill level as the lost engineering jobs.

== Media ==
In terms of television, North East Derbyshire is served by BBC Yorkshire and ITV Yorkshire broadcasting from the Emley Moor transmitter.

Radio stations for the area are:

- BBC Radio Derby
- BBC Radio Sheffield
- Greatest Hits Radio North Derbyshire
- Chesterfield Radio, a community based radio station that broadcast from Chesterfield.

Derbyshire Times is the weekly local newspaper that serves the district .

== Arms ==
Coat of arms of North East Derbyshire

Notes
Originally granted to Chesterfield Rural District Council, 20 September 1954.
Crest
On a wreath Or and Vert out of a mural crown Argent masoned Sable a representation of the crooked spire of Chesterfield Parish Church Proper.
Escutcheon
Or a miner's pick Sable surmounted of a Tudor rose barbed and seeded Proper on a bordure engrailed also Sable eight annulets Gold.
Motto
Regnant Qui Serviunt (They Rule Who Serve)

The council uses its coat of arms as its logo.
