= Shirland and Higham =

Civil parish in Derbyshire, England

Coordinates: 53.124°N 1.415°W

- Civil parish
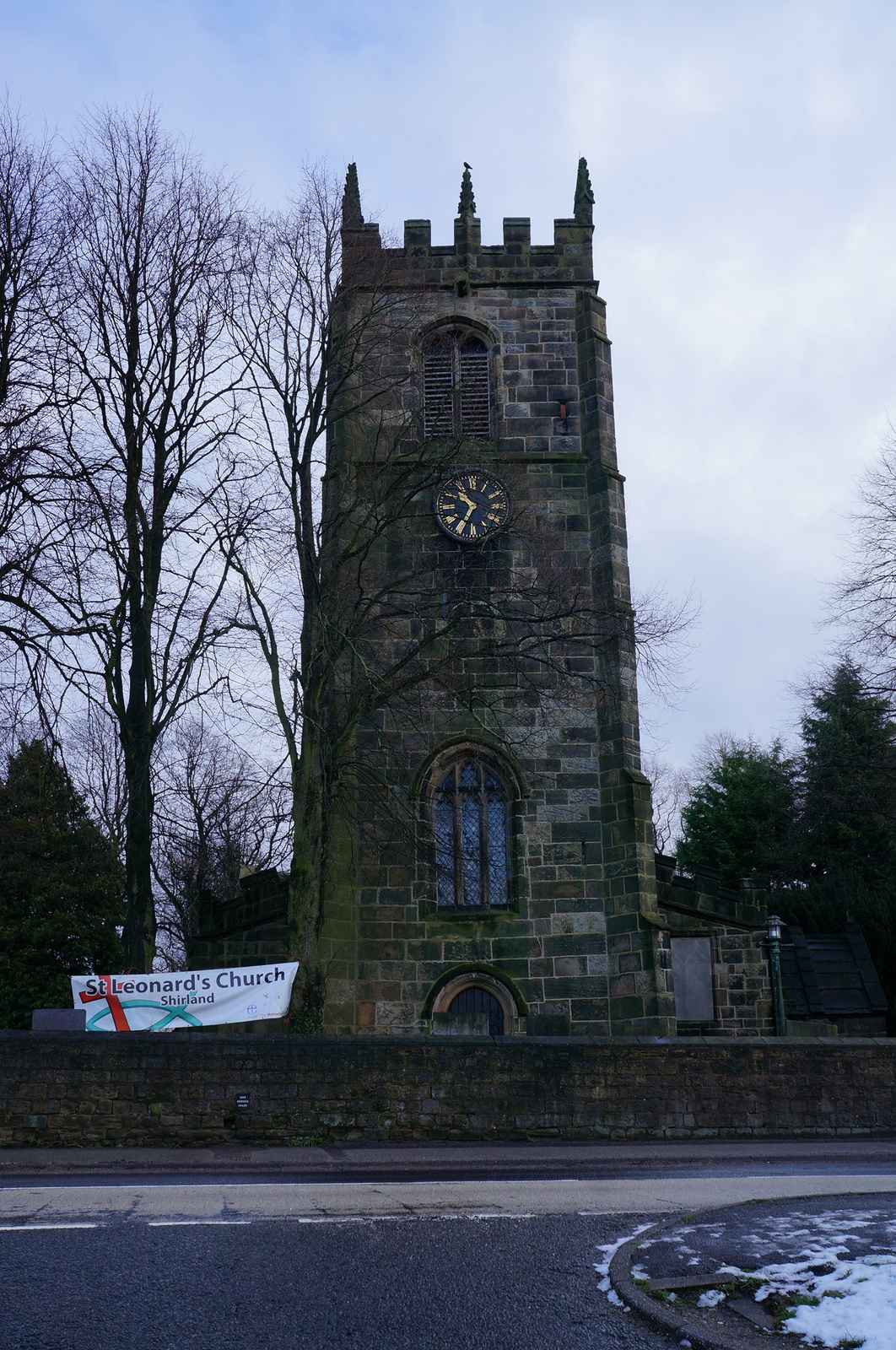
- St Leonard's Church, Shirland

- Location within Derbyshire
- Interactive map of Shirland and Higham
- Area: 4.62 sq mi (12.0 km^{2})
- Population: 5,209 (2021)
  - Density: 1,127/sq mi (435/km^{2})
- OS grid reference: SK 4058
  - London: 120 mi (190 km) SE
- District: North East Derbyshire
- Shire county: Derbyshire
- Region: East Midlands
- Country: England
- Sovereign state: United Kingdom
- Settlements: Shirland: Higham; Stonebroom; Toadhole Furnace; Mickley
- Post town: ALFRETON
- Postcode district: DE55
- Dialling code: 01773
- Police: Derbyshire
- Fire: Derbyshire
- Ambulance: East Midlands
- UK Parliament: Bolsover
- Website: www.shirlandhighampc.co.uk

Shirland and Higham is a civil parish within the North East Derbyshire district, which is in the county of Derbyshire, England. Mainly built up with rural fringes, its population was 5,209 residents in the 2021 census. The parish is 120 miles (190 km) north west of London, 14 miles (23 km) north east of the county city of Derby, and 1 3/4 miles (2.8 km) north of the nearest market town of Alfreton. It shares a boundary with the parishes of Alfreton, Blackwell, Brackenfield, Morton, South Normanton, South Wingfield, Stretton, Tibshelf and Wessington.

== Geography ==
=== Location ===
==== Placement and size ====
Shirland and Higham parish is surrounded by the following local Derbyshire places:

- Morton and Stretton to the north
- Alfreton to the south
- Blackwell and Newton to the east
- Ogston Reservoir and Wessington to the west.

It is 4.62 square miles (12.0 km^{2}; 1,200 ha) in area, 3 miles (4.8 km) in length and 2.5 miles (4.0 km) in width at its broadest, within the far south eastern portion of the North East Derbyshire district, and is to the east of the Derbyshire county near its border with Nottinghamshire. The parish is bounded by land features such as the Morton Brook to the north and east, the Alfreton Brook to the south, and the River Amber and Smithy Brook to the west.

==== Settlements ====
There are a number of areas of built environment within the parish, outside of this containing substantial rural expanse and farmland. The main locales are:

- Shirland
- Higham
- Stonebroom
- Mickley
- Hallfield Gate
- Toadhole Furnace

Shirland, Higham, Hallfield Gate and Stonebroom were once separate villages which over the 20th century have grown and formed a single built-up area. A small portion of Stretton village falls into the parish at its northernmost extent.

===== Shirland =====
This is to the centre northwest of the parish surrounding the A61 road. It is the core focus point of the parish and taking up prominence in the title, historically due to its parish church. Primarily residential, traditionally it was considered to be along Main Road and Town End, It maintains services such as hospitality, church and cemetery, primary school and village hall.

===== Higham =====
Lying to the north west of the parish, and 2/3 mile (1.1 km) from Shirland, it is a wider area spread across a number of roads including the A61 and B6013. It developed around Main Road which is of some antiquity parallel to the nearby river, an offshoot named New Higham was formed around Strettea Lane. Mainly residential, buildings and features include some retail and hospitality.

===== Stonebroom =====
This location is to the north east of the parish and 1 mile (1.6 km) from Shirland, both coalesce into each other. It is primarily a linear settlement along Birkinstyle Lane and High Street, with a small nucleated portion. It contains a mix of mainly residences with small retail outlets, school, churches and a small industrial park.

===== Mickley =====
A standalone area, it is former coalfield community developed in the 1940s as mainly council housing, this is to the north of Higham and north west of the parish. It rests alongside the A61 road.

===== Hallfield Gate =====
In the far west of the parish and up to 1/2 mile (0.80 km) to the west of Shirland, this is a residential area surrounding Hallfieldgate Lane and the B6013 road.

===== Toadhole Furnace =====
Also resting on the B6013, this is 1 mile (1.6 km) to the south west of Shirland and to the far south west of the parish. It is a hamlet and primarily residential with a surrounding rural area.

==== Routes ====
The A61 road is the primary road within the parish, running north–south between Chesterfield and Alfreton. It runs alongside Mickley, and cuts through Higham and Shirland. The B6014 cuts across north of Mickley from Matlock towards Morton and Mansfield. The B6013 also branches off the A61 at Higham, southbound into the outskirts of Hallfield Gate and through Toadhole Furnace towards Belper. The B6025 branches off north of Alfreton towards Tibshelf.

=== Environment ===
==== Landscape ====
The parish rests on the edge of the valley of the River Amber, and it rises steeply towards the various settlements which sit atop a plateau, the surrounding land to the south and east being noticeably lower. The parish is urbanised mainly to the north of the parish, and has some sporadic greenfield land throughout, particularly recreation areas, along with surrounding farmland. The southern area is rural and contains a landscaped golf club south of Shirland. Substantial areas of trees are few, with a small coppice to the north of Mickley, and scattered clusters to the parish east around Morton Brook and west of Higham surrounding ponds.

==== Climate ====
The parish area has around 1,401 hours of sunshine throughout a typical year. There are 66 days of rainfall annually, with 702 mm (27.6 in) of precipitation falling per year. It rains mainly during the summer months of June, July and August. Snow falls for 6.5 days per year on average, with an average of 260 mm (10 in).

==== Geology ====
The bedrock of the parish is in the Pennine Coal Measures Group, split into a western half comprising Pennine Lower Coal Measures Formation while the east is of the Pennine Middle Coal Measures Formation - both made up of mudstones, siltstones and sandstones of various types, dating from between 318 and 309.5 million years ago during the Carboniferous period,. The wider area has historically been mined for coal. The areas surrounding the River Amber, Alfreton Brook and much of the Morton Brook comprises alluvium - clay, silt, sand and gravel, which are sedimentary superficial deposits formed between 11.8 thousand years ago and the present during the Quaternary period. Additionally, a line of hard rock surrounds Shirland while a lengthy layer of Tupton Rock forms a valley ridge starting at Toadhole Furnace and passing through Hallfield Gate, Higham and Mickley.

==== Hydrological features ====
The River Amber is a subsidiary of the River Derwent, it forms much of the parish south western boundary and branches away west of Mickley. The Smithy Brook in turn is a subsidiary that forms the remaining boundary in the west. The Morton Brook separates Morton parish to the north, as well as Tibshelf and Blackwell parishes to the east. The Normanton Brook enters the parish to the far south east before meeting Morton Brook as well as Alfreton Brook, which forms much of the south boundary and flows into the River Amber, south of Toadhole Furnace. There are small fishing ponds to the west of Higham.

==== Land elevation ====
Along the Alfreton Brook near Toadhole Furnace is the lowest portion of the parish at approximately 85 metres (279 ft) and the height increases marginally along the southern boundary of the brook. Toadhole Furnace is 86–96 metres (282–315 ft), but many of the inhabited areas are on higher ground to the north: Shirland is within the range of 128–140 metres (420–459 ft), Stonebroom is 110–140 metres (360–460 ft), Higham 140–165 metres (459–541 ft) and Mickley 140–170 metres (460–560 ft). The highest area is a point between Higham and Mickley atop a reservoir west of the A61, measuring 177 metres (581 ft).

== History ==
=== Toponymy ===
Shirland was the only settlement to be listed in the Domesday 1086 landholding survey. It was described as Sirelunt, which was thought to mean a 'bright, shining grove'. Higham was first recorded in the middle 12th century as 'high village' in reference almost certainly to its location atop the River Amber valley ridge.

=== Prehistory to modern times ===
The parish holds very little proof of its prehistoric past, with relics from that era recorded mainly in the surrounding area just outside the boundary, although a stone axe was found at Stonebroom in 1926, dating from the Neolithic to Late Bronze Age (4000 BC to 701 BC). There is evidence of a Roman (AD 43 to AD 410) presence in the area with Ryknield Street, a key Roman road running north–south through Derbyshire, now plotted by the stretch of A61 and B6013 road between Stretton, Higham and Toadhole Furnace. In 1066, at the time of the Norman Conquest, the area was held by Leofric (son of Osmund), and by 1086, the Domesday Book recorded the Shirland lord of the manor was Warner (father of Robert) who answered to the overall tenant-in-chief, William Peverel. The manor of Ufton, near Alfreton was at the time associated to Shirland.

By the time of the reign of King John (AD 1166 to 1216) it belonged to John de Grey, and Shirland became, for some generations, the seat of this branch of the Grey family, who were later named De Wilton from the seat of their barony. There was a deer park at Shirland owned by the Greys from the early 13th century. In the year 1243, John de Grey was granted a market in the manor and a fair for three days at the festival of St. Peter ad Vincula. The market was held at Higham until 1785, and was thought to have declined due to improved communications links to larger regional markets with the advent of local turnpike roads, which enabled Alfreton to become one such centre. A market cross commemorating this is located in Higham up to the present day, although it was reconstructed a number of times. By the 19th century there was still a fair at Higham on the first Wednesday after New Year's Day, for the sale of cattle.

The general route of the Roman road continued to be used certainly into the 14th century, with evidence being unearthed in the 20th century. From the middle 18th century, it was rebuilt as a turnpike road, deviating slightly at Hallfield Gate and Mickley. After the Greys, the manor passed through several owners, belonging to the Talbots who were Earls of Shrewsbury, and passed to the heiresses. By the 19th century the Earl of Thanet owned a third of Shirland. William Turbutt of Ogston-hall held a similar portion. The remainder was held between William Shore Nightingale of Lea-wood house, and the Hopkinsons of Ufton-field farm.

Stonebroom was two hamlets, named Upper Stone and Lower Stone, but was recognised as a standalone settlement by the 1320s. It remained small however and much of the focus during medieval times was at Shirland and Higham. With Morton colliery just to the north and Shirland pit sunk to the west opening in the 1860s, and housing for miners built for Morton and Shirland collieries at Stonebroom caused it to become the largest settlement in the parish. Originally housing was built to the eastern end of Stonebroom Lane, later following westwards in a linear settlement formation. A sizeable shopping area grew up along the lane. numbering 20 plus retail outlets before the end of the 19th century.

The original Stonebroom and Morton colliery cottages were minimally maintained and from the 1920s the properties were frequently condemned by local authorities, but with a shortage of housing to relocate displaced tenants and employees, which was a situation common in many coal mining communities throughout the north-east of the county in both post war periods, little was done until post World War II, when the local authorities began building 270 new houses at the new Mickley estate from 1947 onwards to relieve the appalling conditions The original builds at Stonebroom were eventually knocked down as the community expanded westwards with a new centre essentially completing by the middle 1960s, the original Stonebroom cottages location becoming the Stonebroom Industrial Estate from the 1970s.

=== Economy ===
The parish sustained some industry, containing a substantial rural area meant agriculture was a core activity. In the villages there was also some domestic framework knitting, stocking weaving and bleaching during the 19th century. Park Mill existed on its eastern boundary near Westhouses until the early 20th century, processing corn; Shirland Lodge farm was rebuilt in 1635, in the middle of the Shirland park area, may have functioned as a middle 16th century or earlier park ranger's lodge; however the western area was also a hive of activity, Higham had a corn mill from at least 1657, later becoming a dairy farm by the turn of the 1900s; a mill operated just south of the Higham Mill in the early 1800s, creating 'bump', which was material made of cotton fibres twisted together and manufactured for candlewicks, it was also woven to make coarse sheets. The site later also was converted to other uses such as corn milling, and the manufacture of food and hosiery items into the later 20th century before it was torn down. At Toadhole Furnace, industry there included quarrying, more corn mills including Amber Mill, as well as Amber House and mill owned by the Hopkinson family of Ufton Farm in Alfreton, and by the 1950s, some opencast mining. However, the location was named for an early 17th century blast furnace, with possible ironstone being mined close by at the nearby Delves farms. Before it closed in the late 18th century the site was used as a tanyard. In the later 20th century Stonebroom Industrial Estate was built atop the original mining community location, and in early 1980s Reeve Burgess, a coachbuilder, obtained premises to expand operations there, but this was closed in 1991.

==== Mining ====
Coal mining was to be the most high-profile industry during the middle 19th and 20th centuries. Coal was being mined in the wider area for some centuries although only with surface workings initially. As the technology improved, lower shafts were created, allowing for more locations to become viable. George Stephenson started building the North Midland Railway through the west portion of the parish in 1837–1839. Coal and iron deposits were found during the construction of the Clay Cross tunnel and he set up a business initially in his name to exploit these, which was later renamed the Clay Cross Company. It began to open a number of coal pits in the region, with Shirland colliery opening south of the village from 1864, mining the Blackshale and Tupton seams. The company built housing in Stonebroom for their labour force at the Shirland and other local collieries from 1866. A railway branch was opened north of Toadhole Furnace to service Shirland colliery, also to the north of Higham a colliery, Mickley Higham, was announced in 1894 by the company and a rail spur taken from the Erewash Valley line north of Stonebroom village and built westwards into the parish, however plans for the pit were aborted soon afterwards and the laid railway line lifted. Shirland eventually employed 530 men and was in operation for just over 100 years, closing in 1965. The former pit area was landscaped by Derbyshire County Council in the early 1970s, later becoming a golf course.

=== Education ===
A mixed public elementary school was built at Shirland in 1851, and enlarged in 1884 to hold 194 boys and girls and 50 infants. By 1911, it was an infants school. An elementary school was founded at Hallfield Gate in 1637, and enlarged in 1876. It was rebuilt in 1891 to hold 101 children. New Higham Public elementary school was built in 1895, it was enlarged in 1905 to hold 272 boys and girls. The Stonebroom Lane elementary School was erected in 1870 for 367 boys and girls and 216 infants.

=== Governance ===
Shirland was in medieval times an ancient parish within the Scarsdale hundred, with local affairs being run by their vestry in conjunction with the manor of Shirland and local courts or justices. The parish became part of the Chesterfield poor law union in 1837, this formed a parallel sanitary district in 1875 gaining additional local powers. With the Local Government Act 1894, this became Chesterfield Rural District. It was then merged into the new non-metropolitan district of North East Derbyshire by the Local Government Act 1972 in 1974.

=== Religion ===
==== Church of England ====
The first report of a church was in 1307 with the Lord of the Manor, Reginald de Grey, also holding the advowson. It is probable a church existed prior, as Higham was a market town from 1243 for which nearby places of worship were usually associated to. The Shirland church was rebuilt in the middle 15th century into the present structure using sandstone blocks, possibly after the Shrewsburys obtained the manor in the time of Edward IV (1461–1483). The church was altered in the 17th century, restored in 1848 and again in 1929 when the chancel was substantially rebuilt with coursed squared sandstone. Inside is a monument for one of the Grey family, probably Sir Henry de Grey, as are several monuments of the family of Revel, of both Shirland and Ogston in the adjacent parish of Morton.

A temporary mission church was opened in the late 1800s at Stonebroom to serve the then growing community, once funds were raised a replacement, St Peter's, was opened in 1900.

==== Other denominations ====
Toadhole Furnace was a relatively early non-conformist centre, opening a Friends meeting house, cemetery and school in 1743. The land was donated by Matthew Hopkinson, a member of the family from the nearby Ufton Farm in Alfreton, his name was added to the fabric of the building. In Higham, a Wesleyan Methodist chapel was opened by John Smedley in 1852 and closed in 1962. Later in the 1800s various Methodist faiths established further chapels in Shirland, Stonebroom and Stretton, with some closing and merging in the 20th century. A Baptist church was built at Stonebroom in 1877 but closed in 1995 and later demolished.

== Governance ==
=== Local bodies ===
Shirland and Higham parish is managed at the first level of public administration through a parish council.

At district level, the wider area is overseen by North East Derbyshire council. Derbyshire County Council provides the highest level strategic services locally.

=== Electoral representation ===
For electoral purposes, the parish is part of the Shirland ward along with Wessington and Brackenfield parishes in the North East Derbyshire district, is within the Wingerworth and Shirland electoral division for Derbyshire county elections; and within the Bolsover parliamentary constituency.

== Demographics ==
=== Population ===
There are 5,209 residents recorded for the 2021 census, an increase from the 4,802 residents recorded within Shirland and Higham parish for the 2011 census, which was a decrease from 4,865 (-1.3%) of the 2001 census. The population majority is mainly working age adults, with the 18-64 years age bracket taking up 60.3%. Infants to teenage years are another sizeable grouping of around 20.5%, with elderly residents (65 years and older) making up a slightly smaller number (19.1%) of the parish population.

=== Labour market ===
A substantial number of 18 years old locals and above are in some way performing regular work, with 64.9% classed as economically active. 35.1% are economically inactive, of which 18.8% are reported as retired. A majority of residents' occupations are in manufacturing, retail trade and repair of motor vehicles and motor cycles, construction, along with health and social work activities (58%).

=== Housing and mobility ===
Over 2,000 residences exist throughout the parish in 2011. The majority of housing stock is of the semi-detached type (58%), then detached (27%) or terraced (13%) and the remainder comprising flats, maisonettes or apartments or caravans (2%). The large majority of these (>1,200) are owner occupied, with other tenure including shared ownership, social and private rentals. The majority of households (79%) report having the use of a car or van.

== Education ==
There are a number of early years and pre-teenager schools:

- Stonebroom Primary And Nursery School
- Shirland - nursery and primary
- Mickley infant school

== Community and leisure ==
=== Amenities and local economy ===
The parish has a number of publicly accessible facilities and commercial business activities, primarily based around the settlements. These include hospitality and public houses at Higham, Shirland has some small retail, hospitality, parish hall, some manufacturing, playground, allotments and golf course, Stonebroom contains a medical centre, an industrial estate area of small units, allotments, village hall, community centre, small shops, sports ground and pavilion. In the Toadhole Furnace locality are a number of rural hospitality options. Surrounding and within Mickley are some retail, a play field, BMX track, camping and caravan parking facilities. In the more rural parts there is a conference centre, agriculture and several farms along with a fishing pond, A water treatment centre is near Stonebroom.

=== Events and community groups ===
Shirland Welfare Band are a brass band based in the village.

== Landmarks ==
=== Conservation ===
==== Structural protections ====
===== Listed buildings =====
There are 42 items of national architectural merit throughout the parish, St Leonard's Church at Shirland holds a statutory designation of Grade II*, the rest have Grade II listed status, and comprises varied features such a number of houses, churches, mileposts, and bridges.

==== Environmental designations ====
===== Conservation areas =====
These are areas (usually urban or the core of a village) of special architectural or historic interest, the character of which is considered worthy of preservation or enhancement. It creates a precautionary approach to the loss or alteration of buildings and/or trees. There are three such local areas defined in the parish, at Higham, Hallfield Gate and Toadhole Furnace.

===== Local reserves =====
There are three areas designated as Local Wildlife Sites within the parish area, which is a non-statutory categorisation used to identify high quality sites in counties, it does not confer any legal restrictions; however, it is a core consideration in planning matters.

- Windmill Field (LWS1) which is located to the north of Shirland and east of Higham.
- Meadow Farm Meadow (LWS2) is located nearby the eastern boundary of the parish area, north of Park Lane.
- Station Road, Morton (LWS3) which is split between the parish area and neighbouring Morton parish.

=== War memorials ===
There are a number of monument items at the Anglican churches in the parish commemorating local personnel who served in the World War I and WWII conflicts:

- A grey stone tablet accompanied by a cross on a wall at Shirland cemetery
- A memorial blue cedar tree in the churchyard accompanied by a dedicatory plaque in the porch in St Leonard's churchyard, Shirland
- Pair of gates with brass plaques attached at St Leonard's churchyard, Shirland
- A memorial clock and plaque at St Peter's, Stonebroom

== Transport ==
=== Bus services ===
Shirland is relatively accessible by public transport, services travel between Alfreton and Chesterfield. The Comet bus route operated by Trent Barton runs between Nottingham and Ripley along the A61 road. It is a scheduled route, with buses on half hour intervals on weekdays and Saturdays, with some longer periods between services on Sundays and bank holidays. A limited service runs from Sutton-in-Ashfield, through Mickley and Higham also to Alfreton.

=== Train services ===
There is no railway station within the parish although the Derwent Valley Line runs along the western parish boundary and the Erewash Valley railway line is close to the parish edge in the east. Along the latter railway route, Alfreton railway station is the nearest station, located approximately 2 miles (3.2 km) south east of Shirland centre.

== Religious sites ==
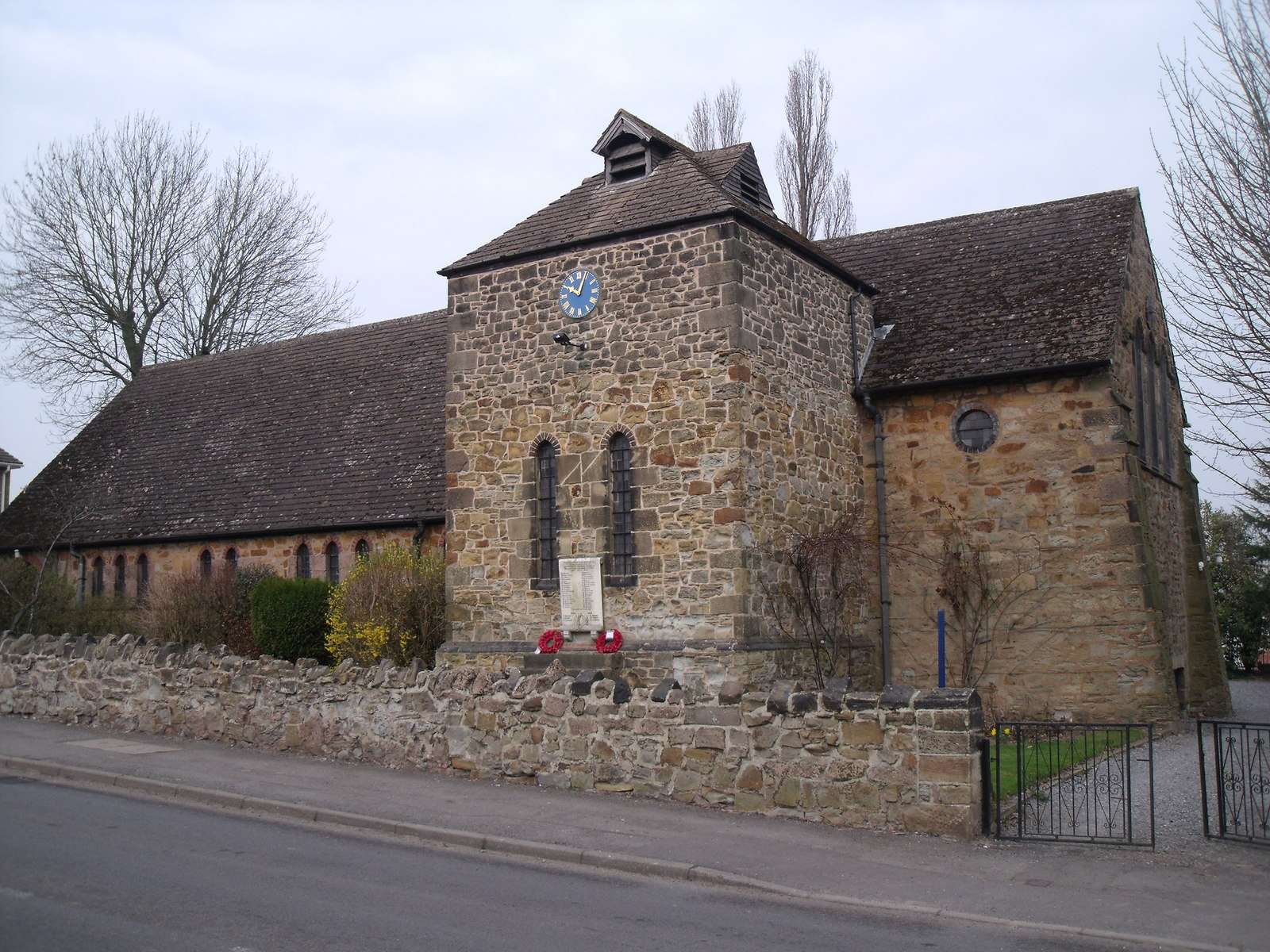
St Peter's, Stonebroom

Of the established state church, there are two Anglican places of worship, St Leonard's at Shirland dates primarily from the 15th century while St Peter's Church is in Stonebroom and was built in 1900–1901. Methodists have a presence at Stonebroom.

== Sport ==
Stonebroom Recreation Ground hosts a sports pavilion, multi-use games area (MUGA), basketball court, tennis court, and football pitch. There is a sports ground at Shirland. A BMX track exists at Mickley.

== Notable people ==
- Immanuel Halton (1628–1699), English astronomer and mathematician, held part of the manor of Shirland
- Ann Swift (c.1748–1790), born in Shirland, wife of Joseph Wright of Derby
- Thomas Grinfield (1788 –1870), English clergyman and hymn-writer, rector of St Leonards, Shirland
- Henry Isaac Stevens FRIBA (1806–1873), architect based in Derby, conducted repairs to St Leonards, Shirland
- George H. Widdows (1871–1946), architect, designed Stonebroom primary school
- Frank Mycroft (1873 –1900), born in Toadhole Furnace, cricket sportsman
- Harold St Alban Hall (1875–1915), cricket sportsman, born in Shirland
- Walter Reader-Blackton (1895–1976), cricket sportsman, born in Shirland
- Herbert Clarence Randle (1906–1976), football sportsman, born in Stonebroom
- Andy Garner (1966–), former football player for Derby County and Blackpool, born in Stonebroom
- Niamh Emerson (1999–), heptathlete, born in Shirland
