= Grade II* listed buildings in North East Derbyshire =

There are over 20,000 Grade II* listed buildings in England. This page is a list of these buildings in the district of North East Derbyshire in Derbyshire.

== List of buildings ==
Name	Location	Type	Completed (Note: The date given is the date used by Historic England as significant for the initial building or that of an important part in the structure's description.)	Date designated	Grid ref. (Note: Sometimes known as OSGB36, the grid reference is based on the British national grid reference system used by the Ordnance Survey.) Geo-coordinates	Entry number (Note: The "List Entry Number" is a unique number assigned to each listed building and scheduled monument by Historic England.)	Image
Barlow Woodseats	Barlow	House	1624	25 October 1957	SK3170475468; 53°16′31″N 1°31′34″W	1087802	Barlow Woodseats More images
Church of St Lawrence	Barlow	Church	Early 13th century	31 January 1967	SK3441974698; 53°16′05″N 1°29′07″W	1033277	Church of St Lawrence More images
Ogston Hall and attached stable block	Brackenfield	Country house	circa 1500	31 January 1967	SK3780259732; 53°08′00″N 1°26′11″W	1087805	Ogston Hall and attached stable block More images
Barn at Frith Hall Farm	Brampton	Cruck barn	Late 16th century	31 January 1967	SK3313070968; 53°14′05″N 1°30′18″W	1218534	Barn at Frith Hall Farm More images
Cutthorpe Hall	Brampton	Manor house	Mid-18th century	31 January 1967	SK3447573048; 53°15′12″N 1°29′05″W	1116985	Upload Photo
Aston End	Dronfield	House	17th century	9 January 1967	SK3603879405; 53°18′37″N 1°27′38″W	1087766	Upload Photo
Building to the north east of the Hall	Dronfield	Hall house	Late 17th century (with earlier remains)	7 July 1989	SK3512078547; 53°18′10″N 1°28′28″W	1040018	Upload Photo
Chiverton House, attached boundary walls, gatepiers and railings	Dronfield	House	17th century	9 January 1967	SK3551278467; 53°18′07″N 1°28′07″W	1087804	Upload Photo
Dronfield Woodhouse Hall farmhouse and attached boundary walls	Dronfield	Farmhouse	Late 16th century	9 January 1967	SK3302878542; 53°18′10″N 1°30′21″W	1187126	Upload Photo
Stable court at Renishaw Hall	Renishaw Park, Eckington	Stable	1795	31 January 1967	SK4365078626; 53°18′10″N 1°20′47″W	1335076	Stable court at Renishaw Hall
The Rectory	Eckington	Vicarage	Late 18th century	31 January 1967	SK4324979706; 53°18′45″N 1°21′08″W	1370038	Upload Photo
Cartledge Hall	Holmesfield	House	1492	25 October 1951	SK3233877310; 53°17′30″N 1°30′59″W	1109626	Upload Photo
Farm outbuildings to the east of Holmesfield Hall	Holmesfield	House	17th century	31 January 1967	SK3197677688; 53°17′43″N 1°31′18″W	1335104	Upload Photo
Holmesfield Hall	Holmesfield	House	17th century or earlier	31 January 1967	SK3193777683; 53°17′43″N 1°31′20″W	1109637	Upload Photo
Outbuilding to the south west of Unthank Hall	Holmesfield	Farm building	Early 17th century	31 January 1967	SK3067876042; 53°16′50″N 1°32′29″W	1109640	Upload Photo
Unthank Hall	Holmesfield	House	Earlier than late 16th century	31 January 1967	SK3070276072; 53°16′51″N 1°32′28″W	1057686	Unthank Hall
Church of St Giles	Killamarsh	Church	12th century	7 July 1989	SK4612080966; 53°19′25″N 1°18′33″W	1057656	Church of St Giles More images
Church of Holy Cross	Morton	Church	Late 13th century	31 January 1967	SK4072560115; 53°08′12″N 1°23′34″W	1335461	Church of Holy Cross More images
Church of St Leonard	Shirland	Church	15th century	31 January 1967	SK3997058458; 53°07′18″N 1°24′15″W	1158790	Church of St Leonard More images
Church of St Mary	Sutton-cum-Duckmanton	Church	Early 14th century	31 January 1967	SK4421268878; 53°12′54″N 1°20′22″W	1108915	Church of St Mary More images
Unstone Manor House	Unstone	Manor house	1630	25 October 1951	SK3694777380; 53°17′32″N 1°26′50″W	1335126	Unstone Manor House
West Handley Hall	Unstone	House	Early 17th century	31 January 1967	SK3983677536; 53°17′36″N 1°24′14″W	1335127	Upload Photo
Stubbing Court	Wingerworth	Country house	Early–mid-18th century	31 January 1967	SK3570267145; 53°12′01″N 1°28′01″W	1291898	Stubbing Court More images

== See also ==
- Grade I listed buildings in Derbyshire
- Grade II* listed buildings in Amber Valley
- Grade II* listed buildings in Bolsover (district)
- Grade II* listed buildings in Chesterfield
- Grade II* listed buildings in Derby
- Grade II* listed buildings in Derbyshire Dales
- Grade II* listed buildings in Erewash
- Grade II* listed buildings in High Peak
- Grade II* listed buildings in South Derbyshire
