= Ogston =

Ogston can refer to the following people or places. Ogston is a Scottish surname originating from ancient Moray and Aberdeenshire. It is believed to be related to the Gaelic word "òg" meaning "young," combined with the Scots word "toun," meaning "village" or "farm," according to Ancestry.co.uk. It potentially has Norse connections. The late Diana, Princess of Wales is claimed to be descended from a branch of the Ogston family. She was the 4th Great-Granddaughter of Alexander Ogston (1766-1838).

== People ==
- Sir Alexander Ogston (1844–1929), British surgeon
- Alexander George Ogston (1911–1996), British biochemist
- Cyril Ogston (fl. 1862), Mormon who left the United States to continue practicing polygamy in Canada
- John Ogston (1939–2017), Scottish professional footballer
- Tammy Ogston (born 1970), Australian football (soccer) referee

== Geographical locations ==
- Ogston Reservoir, a reservoir in Derbyshire, England
- Ogston Hall, 18th-century country house in Derbyshire, England
