= Listed buildings in Shirland and Higham =

Shirland and Higham is a civil parish in the North East Derbyshire district of Derbyshire, England. The parish contains 42 listed buildings that are recorded in the National Heritage List for England. Of these, one is listed at Grade II*, the middle of the three grades, and the others are at Grade II, the lowest grade. The parish contains the villages of Shirland, Higham and Stonebroom and the surrounding area. Most of the listed buildings are houses, cottages, farmhouses and farm buildings. The other listed buildings include two churches, a former Friends' meeting house and school, a former watermill, a village cross, bridges and mileposts.

== Key ==
Grade	Criteria
II*	Particularly important buildings of more than special interest
II	Buildings of national importance and special interest

== Buildings ==
Name and location	Photograph	Date	Notes	Grade
13, 13A, 14 and 15 Main Road, Higham; 53.12955°N 1.41827°W	—	15th century	A house with a timber framed core, later extended, encased in sandstone, and converted into three cottages. The roofs are tiled, and there are stone coped gables and moulded kneelers. The cottages have two storeys and form an L-shaped plan. One doorway has a chamfered quoined surround, and another has a chamfered edge and a four-centred arch. Some windows are mullioned, and others are casements. Inside there are cruck trusses and exposed timber framing.	II
22 and 23 Main Road, Higham; 53.12949°N 1.41783°W	—	15th century	Two cottages combined into one house, it has a cruck framed core, walls of sandstone with gritstone dressings, and a tile roof with a stone coped gable and moulded kneelers to the north. There are two storeys and three bays. Some windows are mullioned, and others are casements, and there are three gabled dormers. Inside there are two full height cruck trusses.	II
Bull Farmhouse; 53.12828°N 1.41814°W	—	15th century	The farmhouse has a timber framed core, and was altered in 1672 and later. The walls are in sandstone with gritstone dressings, quoins and a tile roof. There are two storeys and five bays, the left bay projecting and gabled. The right four bays have casement windows in the ground floor, and three two-light mullioned windows above. In the projecting wing are a doorway in the right return, a casement window in each floor, and in the gable is an initialled and dated stone plaque. Inside the farmhouse are two large cruck trusses.	II
St Leonard's Church, Shirland; 53.12183°N 1.40425°W		15th century	The church has been altered and extended through the centuries, it was restored in 1847–48 by H. I. Stevens, and in 1929 when the chancel was largely rebuilt. The church is built in sandstone with gritstone dressings, the nave and aisles have copper roofs, and the rest of the church is roofed in tile. The church consists of a nave with a clerestory, north and south aisles, a south porch, a chancel, a north vestry, and a west tower. The tower has three stages, stepped diagonal buttresses, and a west doorway with a moulded architrave and hood, and a four-centred arch, and above it is a three-light window. The middle stage contains a clock face and a string course, and in the top stage are bell openings with Y-tracery. At the top is an embattled parapet with corner and central pinnacles. There is also an embattled parapet along the nave and aisles.	II*
Well Farm, 10 Main Road and barn 53.12929°N 1.41836°W	—	15th century	The buildings were later extended, and the farmhouse was refronted in the late 19th century. They are in sandstone with gritstone dressings, the barn has a pantile roof, and the other roofs are tiled with stone coped gables and plain kneelers. The farmhouse has two storeys and two bays, a central chamfered doorway and mullioned windows. The cottage has two storeys and three bays, and contains sash windows. In the barn are two full height doors, two stable doors, and in the east end is a raised cruck truss embedded in the masonry.	II
Yew Tree Farmhouse; 53.11999°N 1.41459°W	—	Early 17th century	The farmhouse is in sandstone with gritstone dressings, quoins, and a tile roof with a stone ridge, and stone moulded gable copings and kneelers. There is a cruciform plan, with a main range of two storeys, attics and a basement, and central projecting wings with two storeys. The doorway has a quoined surround and a shouldered lintel. The windows are mullioned and transomed with casements, and there is a stone sundial.	II
Shirland Lodge Farmhouse; 53.10942°N 1.39009°W		17th century	The farmhouse, which was later altered, is in red brick with diapering, on sandstone foundations, with quoins, the extension is in sandstone, and the roofs are tiled with moulded stone copings, kneelers and ball finials. There are two storeys and attics, three bays, and a single-bay extension, On the west front is a basement containing a doorway with a chamfered surround. Steps lead up to a two-storey gabled porch that has a blocked doorway with a rusticated semicircular head, and a keystone with a lozenge motif. The windows are mixed, and include casements and mullioned windows. At the rear is a three-storey stair turret.	II
Holly Tree Farmhouse; 53.12928°N 1.41791°W	—	1699	The farmhouse, which was refronted and extended in 1853, is in sandstone with gritstone dressings, quoins, and a roof of tile and stone slate with stone coped gables and moulded kneelers. There are two storeys and three bays, the left bay later. On the front are mullioned windows, with three lights in the ground floor and two in the upper floor. Between the upper windows is a stone plaque inscribed with the initial date, and containing an incised oval with the later date.	II
Shirland House and stable block 53.12511°N 1.40619°W		Early to mid 18th century	The house, which was altered between 1780 and 1800, is in sandstone with quoins rising to form corner pilasters, string courses between the floors and at the eaves, low parapets with moulded copings, and a slate roof, hipped to the west. There are two storeys, a double pile plan, five bays on the south and west fronts, and a south cross-wing. The central doorway has a fanlight, the windows to its right are mullioned with two lights, and above and to the left are sash windows. On the south front is a central doorway with a moulded surround, sash windows, and an initialled and dated stone. Attached to the east is a stable block containing a doorway, a blocked mullioned window and casement windows.	II
Rose Cottage; 53.12463°N 1.41791°W	—	1737	The house is in sandstone with gritstone dressings, quoins, a string course, an eaves band, and a red tile roof with a stone ridge. There are two storeys and attics, and three bays. The central doorway has a quoined surround, a dated and initialled lintel, and a moulded hood. The windows on the front are mullioned with two-lights, and on the west front they have single lights; all contain casements.	II
Former Friends Meeting House and School; 53.10834°N 1.42013°W	—	1743	The two buildings are in sandstone with gritstone dressings and slate roofs, and between them is a flight of stone steps. The meeting house to the east has a single storey and one bay. It contains a doorway with a quoined surround, and an inscribed and dated lintel, and two-light mullioned windows. The school house is lower, with two storeys and one bay, and has a doorway with a quoined surround and a four-centred arched head, and sash windows.	II
Mill, Higham Dairy Farm; 53.12133°N 1.42310°W	—	1750	A watermill that was extended in the 19th century, it is in sandstone with gritstone dressings, quoins, and tile roofs with stone coped gables and plain kneelers. The original part has two storeys and attics, and two bays, a doorway with a quoined surround, and mullioned windows. The extension to the north has two storeys and two doorways.	II
11 Main Road, Higham; 53.12956°N 1.41874°W	—	Mid 18th century	The house is in sandstone with gritstone dressings, quoins, and a stone slate roof with moulded stone gable copings and moulded kneelers. There are two storeys and three bays. In the centre is a projecting porch, above which is a segmental-headed single-light window. The other windows are mullioned with two casements.	II
77 and 79 Strettea Lane, Higham; 53.12584°N 1.41791°W	—	Mid 18th century	A pair of houses in sandstone on a plinth, with gritstone dressings, four full height fluted corner pilasters, a projecting moulded and dentilled eaves cornice, and a tile roof with stone coped gables and moulded kneelers. There are two storeys, each house has three bays and there is a bay between them. No. 77 has a central doorway with a moulded surround and a dentilled pediment on scrolled brackets. The doorway of No. 79 has a quoined surround and a broken segmental pediment on brackets. The windows in both houses have moulded surrounds and fluted keystones; in No. 77 they are sashes, and in No. 79 they are casements. In the middle bay is a segmental arch over which is a semicircular-headed sash window with Gothic tracery, a moulded surround, moulded imposts and a keystone.	II
Higham House; 53.12580°N 1.41829°W	—	18th century	The house is in sandstone with gritstone dressings, quoins, and a roof of slate and stone slate with coped gables and plain kneelers. There are two storeys and three bays. The central doorway has large jambs, lintel and imposts. The windows are small-paned, some with single lights, and others mullioned with two lights.	II
Stonebroom Farmhouse; 53.13170°N 1.38432°W	—	Mid 18th century	The farmhouse, which was extended in the 19th century, is in sandstone with gritstone dressings, and has a slate roof with a stone ridge. There are three storeys and three bays. On the front are two doorways, one with a quoined surround, the other with a bracketed hood. The windows in the lower two floors are mullioned, and in the top floor they are casements.	II
Strathfield House; 53.14792°N 1.41732°W	—	18th century	A farmhouse that was refronted in the 19th century, it is in sandstone with gritstone dressings, quoins, and a tile roof with stone coped gables and kneelers, moulded to the south. There are two storeys and two bays. On the front is a doorway with a chamfered surround, and a lintel with a four-centred arch. The windows are mullioned, and there are two gabled dormers. At the rear is a central doorway with a quoined surround.	II
Swan Farmhouse; 53.13987°N 1.41780°W		Mid 18th century	The farmhouse is in sandstone with gritstone dressings, quoins, and a tile roof. There are two storeys and three bays. On the front are two doorways, and the windows are mullioned with two lights.	II
The Crown Hotel and 32 Main Street, Higham; 53.12615°N 1.41823°W		18th century	Four cottages combined into a public house, it is in gritstone with quoins, and a tile roof with stone coped gables and moulded kneelers to the south. There are two storeys and six bays. On the front are four doorways, two with quoined surrounds. The windows are sashes, some horizontally-sliding, and on the front is a four-stepped mounting block.	II
Village Cross, Higham; 53.12761°N 1.41829°W		18th century	The village cross, which was restored in 1856, is in sandstone. It stands on an 18th-century plinth of six square steps, and has a 19th-century column with a chamfered square knot, and a Greek-type cross.	II
Furnace House; 53.10752°N 1.41933°W	—	1751	The house, which was restored in the 1970s, is in sandstone on a shallow plinth, with gritstone dressings, quoins raised to form corner pilasters, a floor band, a coved eaves band, and a tile roof with stone coped gables and moulded kneelers. There are three storeys, a double depth plan, two bays, and a later single-storey extension on the east. The central doorway has a moulded surround, the windows on the front are mullioned, and at the rear is a tall mullioned and transomed stair window. Above the doorway is a circular inscribed and dated stone plaque with a moulded hood.	II
26, 27 and 28 Main Road and barn, Higham; 53.12772°N 1.41817°W		Late 18th century	A row of three cottages in sandstone with gritstone dressings, and a tile roof with a stone ridge, stone coped gables and moulded kneelers. There are two storeys and each cottage has two bays. The doorways have flush surrounds, in No. 28 there is a canted bay window, and the other windows either have a single light or are mullioned with two casements. Attached at the north is a single-storey barn.	II
29 Main Road and cottage, Higham; 53.12751°N 1.41823°W		Late 18th century	The house and attached cottage are in sandstone with gritstone dressings and roofs of stone slate and slate. There are two storeys, the house has three bays, and the cottage to the right is lower with a single bay. The house has a doorway with massive jambs, lintel and imposts. Over the doorway is a semicircular-headed window with a keystone, and the other windows are mullioned with two lights. The cottage has a doorway, and a sash window in each floor, the window in the upper floor horizontally-sliding.	II
43 Main Road, Higham; 53.12556°N 1.41831°W	—	Late 18th century	The house is in sandstone on a plinth, with gritstone dressings, quoins, and a slate roof with stone coped gables and plain kneelers. There are two storeys and three bays. Two steps lead up to a central doorway, above which is a casement window. The other windows are mullioned with two casements.	II
The Haven; 53.12810°N 1.41846°W	—	Late 18th century	Two cottages combined into one house, it is in sandstone with gritstone dressings, quoins, and a tile roof. There are two storeys, three bays, and a single-storey single-bay extension on the left. Steps lead up to a pair of doorways with double keystones in the centre. Above the doorway is a blocked window with a semicircular head and a fluted keystone, and the other windows are mullioned with two lights.	II
33 Main Road, Higham; 53.12604°N 1.41794°W	—	Early 19th century	The house is in sandstone with gritstone dressings and a tile roof with a stone ridge. There are two storeys and two bays. In the centre is a doorway, and the windows are mullioned with two casements.	II
1 Town End, Shirland; 53.12523°N 1.40656°W	—	Early 19th century	A house in sandstone with a coved eaves band, and an asbestos slate roof with stone coped gables and moulded kneelers. There are two storeys and three bays. The central doorway has a chamfered surround and a divided fanlight. The windows are small-paned, the window above the doorway has a semicircular head and a keystone.	II
Amber Farmhouse; 53.10841°N 1.42435°W	—	Early 19th century	The farmhouse is in sandstone on a plinth, with quoins, an eaves cornice, low parapets, and a hipped tile roof, with slate on the north wing. There are three storeys and five bays, and recessed two-storey single bay wings. In the centre is a Doric doorway with a semicircular fanlight and a broken pediment. The windows are sashes with voussoirs, and some with skewback lintels and keystones.	II
Gateway and wall, Amber Farmhouse; 53.10874°N 1.42442°W	—	Early 19th century	The gateway is in brick with sandstone dressings, rusticated quoins, and a pantile roof with a coped gable. It consists of a large triple archway in Venetian style with a projecting keystone and a moulded pediment. On each side is a stone wall with flat copings.	II
Amber Hill Bridge; 53.10775°N 1.42296°W	—	Early 19th century	The bridge carries Amber Green over the River Amber. It is in sandstone, and consists of two segmental arches with radiating voussoirs. The bridge has semicircular cutwaters rising to copings with a rounded top. Over the arches is a plain band, and parapets curving outwards, ending in square piers.	II
Amber House and mill 53.10809°N 1.42074°W	—	Early 19th century	The house and attached mill are in sandstone. The house has a pyramidal slate roof, two storeys and three bays. On the front is a porch, and the windows are sashes with skewback lintels. Attached to the east is the former mill that has four bays and an asbestos sheet roof. It contains semicircular windows with keystones.	II
Outbuilding north of Amber House; 53.10835°N 1.42092°W	—	Early 19th century	The outbuilding is in sandstone, and has an asbestos sheet roof with a stone ridge. There are two storeys, two bays, and a flush doorway. The windows are sashes, in the ground floor with skewback lintels, incised voussoirs and projecting keystones, and in the upper floor they are horizontally-sliding with incised lintels and projecting keystones.	II
Cross House; 53.12726°N 1.41823°W		Early 19th century	The house is in sandstone with gritstone dressings, and a slate roof with a stone ridge, and a stone coped gable and plain kneelers to the north. There are two storeys and two bays. In the centre is a doorway with a plain surround, and the windows are sashes, those in the ground floor with skewback lintels and incised voussoirs.	II
Milepost near Carr Hill Farm; 53.11707°N 1.41531°W		Early 19th century	The milepost on the west side of the B6013 road is in cast iron. It has a moulded angle, and a flat back with a segmental head that curves forward to form a horizontal panel below. On the back is inscribed "TOWNSHIP OF SHIRLAND", on the sides are the distances to Derby, Clay Cross, Chesterfield and Dronfield, and on the front is a panel with details of the manufacturer.	II
Milepost near Quarry Farmhouse; 53.13087°N 1.41790°W		Early 19th century	The milepost on the west side of the A61 road is in cast iron. It has a moulded angle, and a flat back with a segmental head that curves forward to form a horizontal panel below. On the back is inscribed "TOWNSHIP OF HIGHAM", on the sides are the distances to Derby, Clay Cross, Chesterfield, Dronfield and Sheffield, and on the front is a panel with details of the manufacturer.	II
Milepost opposite Hilltop Farmhouse; 53.14480°N 1.41504°W		Early 19th century	The milepost on the west side of the A61 road is in cast iron. It has a moulded angle, and a flat back with a segmental head that curves forward to form a horizontal panel below. On the back is inscribed "TOWNSHIP OF HIGHAM", on the sides are the distances to Derby, Clay Cross, Chesterfield, Dronfield and Sheffield, and on the front is a panel with details of the manufacturer.	II
Shirland Park Farmhouse; 53.11294°N 1.37720°W		Early 19th century	The farmhouse is in sandstone, on a plinth, with painted dressings, quoins, an impost band stepped over the doorway, an eaves band, and a slate roof with coped gables and plain kneelers. There are two storeys, and an L-shaped plan consisting of a front of two bays, and a rear wing. The central doorway has a chamfered surround, and the windows are sashes. Above the doorway is an inscribed plaque, and in the rear wing is a semicircular-headed doorway.	II
Amber Mill Bridge; 53.10795°N 1.42243°W		c. 1836–40	The bridge was built by the North Midland Railway to carry its line over Amber Green. It is in sandstone with soffits in red brick, and consists of a single segmental skew arch with rusticated voussoirs rising from impost bands. Above the arch is moulding, and parapets with steel railings. The wing walls end in octagonal stone piers.	II
Holmes Water Bridge; 53.12447°N 1.42673°W	—	c. 1836–40	The bridge was built by the North Midland Railway to carry its line over the River Amber. It is in sandstone with soffits in red brick, and consists of a single segmental arch with rusticated voussoirs rising from impost bands. Above the arch is moulding, and low parapets with steel railings. The abutment walls are widely splayed.	II
Ogston Lane Bridge; 53.13294°N 1.42617°W	—	c. 1836–40	The bridge was built by the North Midland Railway to carry Ogston Lane over its line. It is in sandstone with soffits in red brick, and consists of a single segmental arch with rusticated voussoirs and keystones. The arches rise from impost bands, and above the arch is moulding, and low parapets with flat copings, ending at capped semi-octagonal piers.	II
Stable block, Bull Farm; 53.12827°N 1.41776°W	—	1846	The stable block is in sandstone with gritstone dressings, and has a roof of asbestos sheet and slate with moulded stone gable copings and kneelers. There are two storeys and six bays. On the front are four doorways and four small-paned windows, all with four-centred arched heads, and two segmental arches. In the north gable is an initialled and dated plaque.	II
St Peter's Church, Stonebroom; 53.13359°N 1.37992°W		1900–07	The tower was raised in 1922. The church is built in sandstone with dressings in gritstone and brick, and a tile roof. It consists of a nave, a chancel, and a projecting large tower to the southeast. The tower has a plinth, two lancet windows and a clock face in the south front, and louvred dormers on each side of the hipped roof. Most of the windows are lancets, and there are two circular windows in the chancel.	II
