= Woolley Moor =

Village in Derbyshire, England

Coordinates: 53.149°N 1.451°W

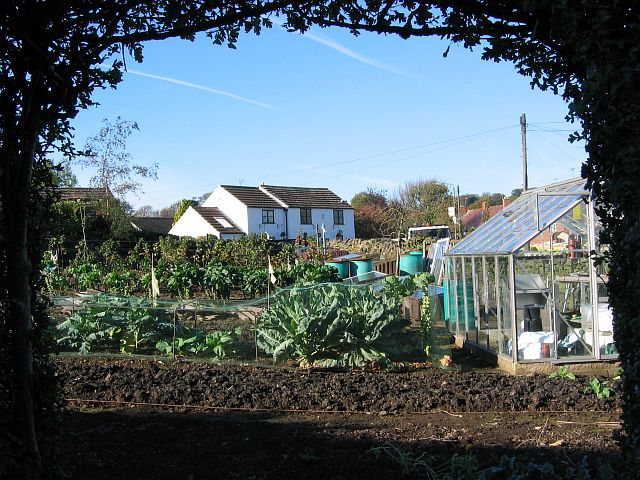
- Woolley Moor.

- Location within Derbyshire
- OS grid reference: SK371610
- Civil parish: Stretton
- District: North East Derbyshire
- Shire county: Derbyshire
- Region: East Midlands
- Country: England
- Sovereign state: United Kingdom
- Post town: ALFRETON
- Postcode district: DE55 6xx
- Dialling code: 01246
- Police: Derbyshire
- Fire: Derbyshire
- Ambulance: East Midlands
- UK Parliament: North East Derbyshire

Woolley Moor is a small village in the North East Derbyshire district of Derbyshire, England. Its amenities include a school, a church and a public house called the White Horse. Almost all of the villagers work outside the village although there are two family run dairy farms creating employment for a handful of people.

== History ==
The River Amber valley was flooded in 1958 and completely submerged farmland, roads and part of the Ashover Light Railway. The Ogston Reservoir also destroyed most of the village of Woolley, including the Woolley House Hydro, the village store, the blacksmiths, the joiners, the laundry, the sheep dip and Napoleons Home, the local public house. The Woolley villagers were relocated into council houses built in another local hamlet, Badger Lane, which eventually became known as the village of Woolley on the Moor, and subsequently became the present village of Woolley Moor, although on the 1891 census, many people living in Shirland, Stonebroom and Stretton are shown to have been born at Wooley Moor, as well as at Woolley. This suggests that a village of that name existed long before the flooding of the valley. Over the years Woolley Moor has had a number of shops and a post office although these have been transformed into normal houses since the 1980s. There was also another public house named 'The New Napoleon' which closed for good after a period of uncertainty in the late 2000s.

== See also ==
- Listed buildings in Stretton, Derbyshire
- List of places in Derbyshire
- Ogston Reservoir
