= Wessington =

Village in Derbyshire, England

Coordinates: 53.1165°N 1.4479°W

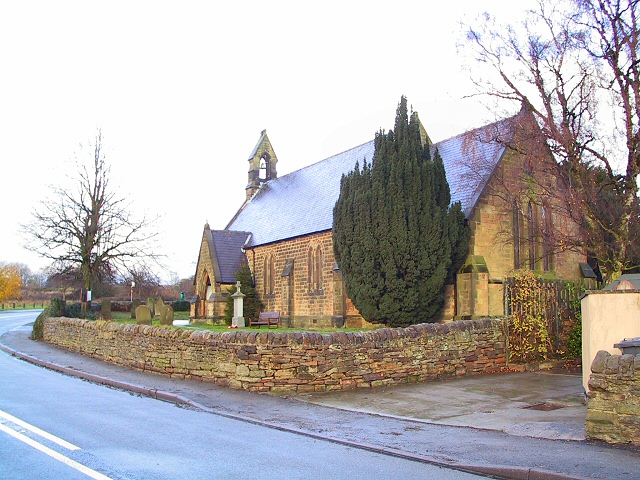
- Christ Church, Wessington.

- Location within Derbyshire
- Population: 576 (2011)
- OS grid reference: SK370578
- Civil parish: Wessington
- District: North East Derbyshire
- Shire county: Derbyshire
- Region: East Midlands
- Country: England
- Sovereign state: United Kingdom
- Post town: ALFRETON
- Postcode district: DE55
- Police: Derbyshire
- Fire: Derbyshire
- Ambulance: East Midlands
- UK Parliament: Bolsover

Wessington is a village and civil parish in the English county of Derbyshire. The population of the civil parish at the 2011 census was 576. It is in the North East Derbyshire district of the county. It is near to the towns of Matlock, Alfreton and the village of Brackenfield. Situated 740 ft above sea level.

The civil parish of Wessington is, along with Shirland and Higham, the most southerly parish in the district. It stands on the west side of the Amber Valley on the Alfreton to Matlock Road. The settlement is centered on a large village green, a fish and chip shop and an old pub, "The Horse and Jockey".

== History ==
When the Domesday Book was compiled in 1086, the village was known as Wistanestune, which may have been derived from the Anglo-Saxon words for 'water' and 'town', meaning "wet place". The village was then called Washington before acquiring its present name. The parish was separated from Crich in 1859. At the time, the village had a fairly large stocking frame knitting industry, with the majority of the inhabitants being employed in it.

== Economy ==
Businesses in Wessington include a fish and chip shop and a public house (the Horse and Jockey).

== Parish Council ==
The Parish Council is within the ward of Shirland which is within the district of North East Derbyshire. The Parish Council website is www.wessingtonparishcouncil.co.uk

== The Greens ==
Wessington has land deemed as "village greens" and others which are "common Land". There is also a nature reserve area.

== See also ==
- Listed buildings in Wessington
- Rattle, Derbyshire
- List of places in Derbyshire
