= St Leonard's Church, Shirland =

St Leonard’s Church, Shirland
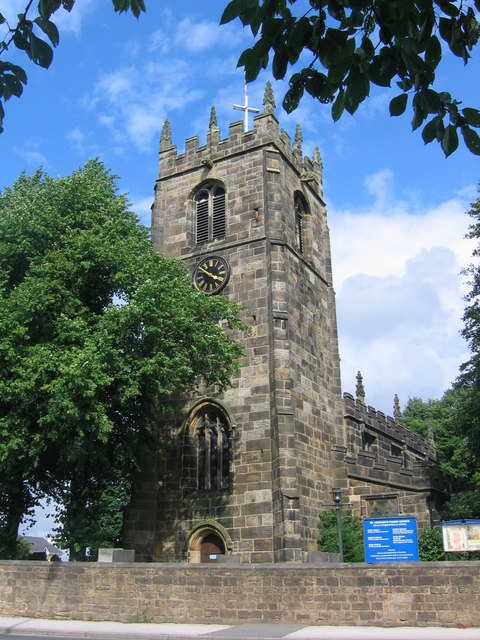
- St Leonard’s Church, Shirland
- St Leonard’s Church, Shirland
- 53°7′16.64″N 1°24′18.91″W
- OS grid reference: SK 39970 58458
- Location: Shirland, Derbyshire
- Country: England
- Denomination: Church of England

History
- Dedication: St Leonard

Architecture
- Heritage designation: Grade II* listed

Administration
- Province: Canterbury
- Diocese: Derby
- Archdeaconry: Chesterfield
- Deanery: Alfreton
- Parish: Shirland

St Leonard's Church, Shirland is a Grade II* listed parish church in the Church of England in Shirland, Derbyshire.

== History ==
The church dates from the 15th century. Alterations were made in the 17th century. It was restored between 1848 and 1849 under the direction of the architect Henry Isaac Stevens and was re-opened by the Bishop of Lichfield on 24 January 1849.

The church was restored again in 1929.

== Parish status ==
The church is in a joint parish with:

- Holy Cross Church, Morton
- St Peter's Church, Stonebroom

== Organ ==
An organ was installed at a cost of £200 (equivalent to £22,220 in 2025) in 1885 by John Stringer and Co of Hanley. A specification of the organ can be found on the National Pipe Organ Register.

== Bells ==
The church tower contains a ring of 6 bells.

== See also ==
- Grade II* listed buildings in North East Derbyshire
- Listed buildings in Shirland and Higham
