= Higham, Derbyshire =

Village in Derbyshire, England

Coordinates: 53.127°N 1.417°W

Higham
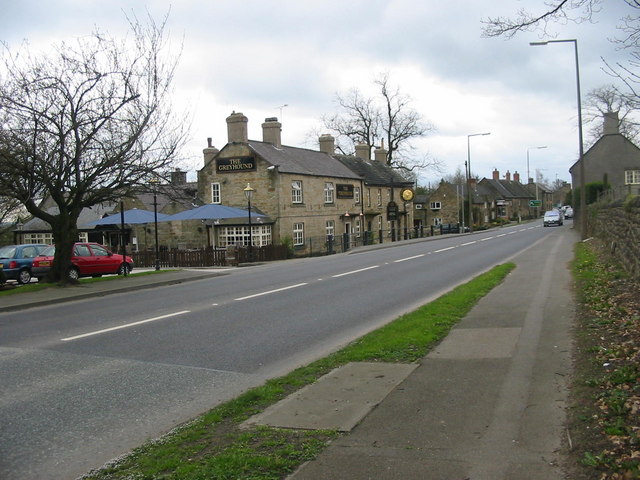
- Greyhound pub and the main street

- Location within Derbyshire
- OS grid reference: SK391590
- Civil parish: Shirland and Higham
- District: North East Derbyshire
- Shire county: Derbyshire
- Region: East Midlands
- Country: England
- Sovereign state: United Kingdom
- Post town: ALFRETON
- Postcode district: DE55
- Dialling code: 01773
- Police: Derbyshire
- Fire: Derbyshire
- Ambulance: East Midlands
- UK Parliament: Bolsover

Higham is a small village in Derbyshire, England. It is on the B6013 and A61 roads. Nearby settlements include Shirland, Stretton, Alfreton and Clay Cross. It is in the civil parish of Shirland and Higham. The name Higham is of Saxon origin.

The village has two public houses, the Crown Inn and the Greyhound. It does not have a church of its own, sharing St Leonard's church with neighbouring Shirland.

== See also ==
- Listed buildings in Shirland and Higham
