= Stonebroom =

Village in Derbyshire, England

Coordinates: 53.1329°N 1.3788°W

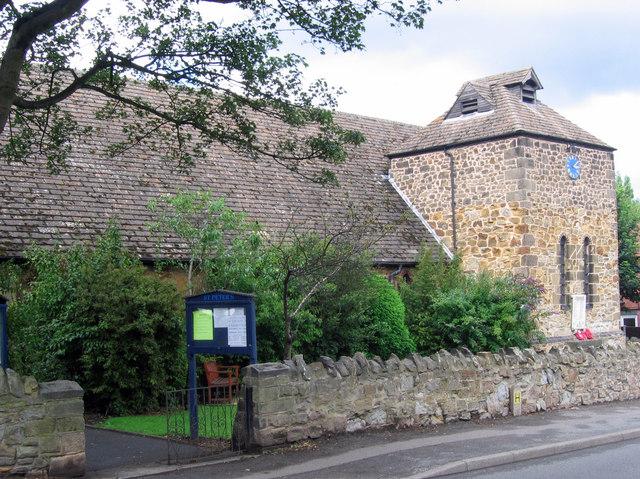
- St Peter's Church, Stonebroom was built in 1900. It is part of a Benefice with the Church of England churches in Shirland and Morton.

- Location within Derbyshire
- OS grid reference: SK415597
- Civil parish: Shirland and Higham
- District: North East Derbyshire
- Shire county: Derbyshire
- Region: East Midlands
- Country: England
- Sovereign state: United Kingdom
- Post town: ALFRETON
- Postcode district: DE55
- Dialling code: 01773
- Police: Derbyshire
- Fire: Derbyshire
- Ambulance: East Midlands
- UK Parliament: North East Derbyshire

Stonebroom is a village in the district of North East Derbyshire in Derbyshire, England. It is in the civil parish of Shirland and Higham.

Stonebroom lies to the east of the A61 between Alfreton and Clay Cross. It has a primary, nursery, pre-school and two churches, one Church of England and one Methodist. Five households are listed for Stonebroom in the 1841 Census (Shirland Parish) with a sixth listed separately under Pasture House which is part of the village. A directory from 1846 does not mention Stonebroom but one from 1857 acknowledges it and only gives the names of four farmers resident there. A directory from 1895 describes it as "a considerable village – it is a typical colliery village, and has sprung into existence in recent years".

In the mid-19th century, houses were built for colliery workers and were called 'the blocks'. These were blocks of eight terraced houses with 160 dwellings. They were condemned before 1939 but still there in 1947 and described by the Derbyshire Times as "The Black Hole of Derbyshire". In 1950 they were demolished but the area of wasteland was known as The Blocks by the locals. From the 1970s new housing and industrial estates were built on the land. Meanwhile, a massive housing estate had already been established in the "upper" area of Stonebroom.

The village is linear and was formed from two hamlets; early maps show them as Upper Stone and Lower Stone. The school playing field was once the site of a quarry, and is still called Quarry Lane. It is probable that the name Stonebroom was derived from this quarry which provided stone; it is said that the field behind the quarry was full of broom, which gave one possible explanation for the unusual village name. Another report states that the Roman Stan Brom means quarry.

== Notable people ==
- Joe Humphries (1876–1946), cricketer, he played 302 First-class cricket games for Derbyshire and 3 Test cricket games for England
- Harry Randle (1906–1976), footballer who played 224 games including 74 for Accrington Stanley
- Bill Copson (1908–1971), cricketer, he played 279 First-class cricket games for Derbyshire and 3 Test cricket games for England
- Andy Garner (born 1966), footballer, he played 231 games including 160 with Blackpool

== See also ==
- Listed buildings in Shirland and Higham
