= Ogston Hall =

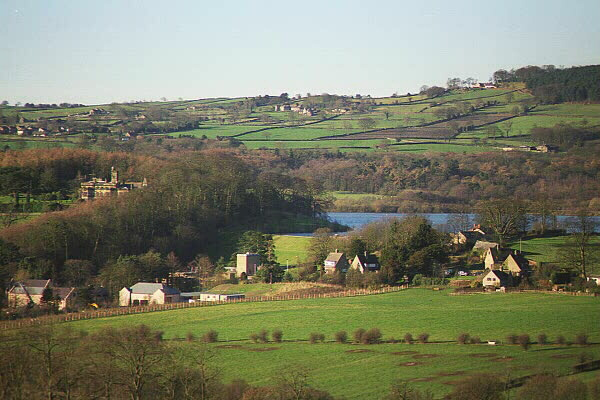
- Distant view of Ogston Hall

- Location within Derbyshire

General information
- Location: Brackenfield, England
- Coordinates: 53.1335°N 1.4364°W
- Ordnance Survey: SK3780259732
- Construction started: c. 1500
- Client: Revell family

Design and construction
- Designations: Grade II

Renovating team
- Architects: Joseph Pickford, 1768; Thomas Chambers Hine (1851–1864)

Ogston Hall is a privately owned 18th-century country house situated at Brackenfield, near Alfreton, Derbyshire. It is a Grade II* listed building. A building on the site is listed in the Domesday Book as part of the Deincourt manor of Morton. The Revell family of South Normanton held Ogston in the 14th century by marriage to the Deincourt heiress.

The house has its origins about 1500 but was much altered in the 17th century by the Revells. A two-storey north west wing with attics and basement was added in 1659 and a connected stable block was added in 1695. The earliest member of the family of whom anything is known was Thomas Revell of Ogston, sergeant-at-law, who made a fortune from lead smelting. His will of 1474 survives.

== Subsequent history ==
In 1706 William Revell died unmarried at the age of 19 so left the estate to his sisters, Mary Ann and Catherine. Mary Ann married Richard Turbutt, who bought out Catherine's interest.

In 1768 his son William Turbutt further altered and extended the house by adding a five-bay south east wing to a design by architect Joseph Pickford. Further work was done for Thomas Turbutt by TC Hine in 1851, including a five-storey castellated tower. In the mid-1800s, Gladwin Turbutt (1823–72) arranged for additional modifications. In the late 18th century, the park was landscaped and the farms were re-arranged.

== Recent history ==
Part of the estate was flooded in 1957 for the creation of the Ogston Reservoir.

Several of the Turbutts served as High Sheriff of Derbyshire. The most recent Turbutt to reside at the Hall was Gladwyn Turbutt, the historian and writer. He was High Sheriff in 1998.

The property was Listed in January 1967. The summary provides some specifics about the modifications over the centuries, including the "refashioning of 1851 to 1864 by T C Hine" and mentions an addition made in 1910.

After World War II, the building was rented to various groups for use as schools and religious worship. In 1973 it was sold to Frank Wakefield, who completed some repairs. Subsequent restoration was completed by his son and daughter in law; the latter restored the terraced gardens.

A 2017 report indicates that the Hall is the seat of David and Caroline Wakefield and cites the work done by architect Thomas Chambers Hine, who modified the house during 1851-64.

The Historic Houses web site in early 2020 stated that "the current owners have refurnished the house with appropriate furniture and pictures, so that the interior looks much as it did in early 20th-century photographs".

== See also ==
- Grade II* listed buildings in North East Derbyshire
- Listed buildings in Brackenfield
