= Listed buildings in Brackenfield =

Brackenfield is a civil parish in the North East Derbyshire district of Derbyshire, England. The parish contains 15 listed buildings that are recorded in the National Heritage List for England. Of these, one is listed at Grade II*, the middle of the three grades, and the others are at Grade II, the lowest grade. The parish contains the village of Brackenfield and the surrounding area. The most important building in the parish is Ogston Hall, a country house, that is listed together with associated structures. The other listed buildings are farmhouses and farm buildings, a church and its lychgate, a ruined chapel, a public house, a wall containing a gravestone and a guidepost, and a railway bridge.

== Key ==
Grade	Criteria
II*	Particularly important buildings of more than special interest
II	Buildings of national importance and special interest

== Buildings ==
Name and location	Photograph	Date	Notes	Grade
Trinity Chapel; 53.13001°N 1.46593°W		Late 15th century (probable)	The chapel, now a ruin, is in sandstone and is without a roof. It consists of a single cell with a south porch containing seats, and an inner doorway with a chamfered surround. On the west gable is a bellcote with twin semicircular arches, on the east gable is a cross, and the windows are mullioned.	II
Ogston Hall and stable block 53.13341°N 1.43645°W	—	c. 1500	A country house that has been extended over the years, and was refashioned during the 19th century. The older parts are in sandstone and the later parts are in gritstone, it has quoins, some of which are rusticated, and slate roofs. There are two storeys, attics and basements, and a roughly quadrangular plan, with the stable block extending to the east. Most of the windows are mullioned or mullioned and transomed, and there are bay windows and an oriel window. Other features include gables, one shaped, and a five-storey Gothic tower with an embattled parapet and a domed stair turret.	II*
Mather's Grave, guidepost and wall 53.12678°N 1.46405°W		1643	The retaining wall at a road junction incorporates a square stone block inscribed "SM 1643", and in the centre is a guidepost dated 1730 indicating the roads to Ashover, Matlock and Bakewell.	II
Broomhill Farmhouse; 53.12443°N 1.43786°W	—	17th century	The farmhouse, which was extended in 1834, is in sandstone with gritstone dressings, quoins, two moulded string courses, and a stone slate roof with moulded gable copings and kneelers. There are three storeys and a T-shaped plan, with a main range of three bays, a two-storey single-bay extension on the right, and a gabled three-storey stair tower at the rear. The original main door has a quoined moulded surround, it is partly filled by an inserted window, and above it is a dated and initialled plaque. There are two other datestones, one over the door in the extension, and the other in the left gable end. The windows are mullioned, and in the stair tower they are stepped.	II
Teapot Farmhouse and barn 53.12651°N 1.44841°W	—	17th century	The farmhouse was refronted in the 19th century and extended to the rear in the 20th century. It is in sandstone, with the remains of quoins, and a slate roof with a stone ridge. There are two storeys and two bays, and to the right is a single-storey barn with three bays that has been converted for residential use. The original doorway has a chamfered surround and has been converted into a two-light window with a mullion, and the other windows in both parts are mullioned.	II
Sawmill, Ogston Hall; 53.13324°N 1.43707°W	—	Late 17th century	The sawmill was altered in the 19th century, and has since been used for other purposes. It is in sandstone and has a tile roof with a stone ridge, moulded gable copings, and inverted moulded kneelers. There are two storeys and six bays. The building contains three segmental-arched doorways with quoined sides, and rectangular openings in both floors.	II
Sundial, Ogston Hall; 53.13306°N 1.43628°W	—	18th century	The sundial in the lawn to the south of the hall is in sandstone. It has a plain base and a pear-shaped stem. On the top is an inscribed copper dial and a triangular scrolled gnomon.	II
Kitchen garden walls and doorway, Ogston Hall; 53.13293°N 1.43741°W	—	Late 18th century	The walls enclose a kitchen garden with a parallelogram shape, and they are in sandstone with corbelled copings and a red brick internal wall. In the east wall is a doorcase of reused materials, with quoined sides, and a dated and initialled lintel with a four-centred arch. The west wall has a depressed arch with a raised keystone and inscribed voussoirs. In the north wall is a reused 13th-century window, and a doorcase with a quoined surround and a dated and initialled lintel.	II
Lindway Lane Farmhouse; 53.12038°N 1.46496°W	—	1808	The farmhouse is in sandstone with gritstone dressings, the gable ends rendered, and a tile roof. There are two storeys and three bays. On the front is a doorway with a quoined surround, above which is a dated and initialled plaque. To the left is another doorway with a porch, and the windows are sashes.	II
The Plough Inn and barn 53.12472°N 1.46358°W		Early 19th century	A farmhouse, later a public house with an attached barn, it is in sandstone with gritstone dressings, and slate roofs with stone ridges. The former house has two storeys and two bays, and to the left is a protruding single-storey single-bay extension. On the front is a gabled porch, and the windows are mullioned. To the right is a two-storey three-bay barn containing two doorways with quoined surrounds, and a staircase leading to an upper floor doorway.	II
Coach house, Ogston Hall; 53.13372°N 1.43680°W	—	1834	The coach house is in sandstone with gritstone dressings, and has a stone slate roof with a stone ridge, coped gables, and kneelers. There is a single storey, three bays, and a lean-to at each end. The coach house contains three semicircular-headed archways with keystones.	II
Hills Bridge; 53.12105°N 1.42548°W		1836–40	The bridge was built by the North Midland Railway as an accommodation bridge to carry its line over a farm track. It is in gritstone with a red brick soffit, and consists of a single semicircular arch. The bridge has rusticated voussoirs springing from an impost band, a projecting keystone, a parapet with metal railings, and curving wing walls.	II
Holy Trinity Church; 53.12701°N 1.44419°W		1856–57	The church was designed by T. C. Hine in Decorated style, and a chapel and vestry were added in 1872. It is built in sandstone with gritstone dressings, and has a slate roof with crested ridge tiles. The church consists of a nave, a north aisle, a chancel with a vestry, a northeast chapel with a crypt, and a northwest steeple. The steeple has a tower with two stages, angle buttresses, a southwest stair turret, and a broach spire with a frieze of gableted trefoil openings.	II
Lychgate, Holy Trinity Church; 53.12675°N 1.44461°W		c. 1857	The lychgate was designed by T. C. Hine, and has stone side walls and double gates. The superstructure is in wood, and consists of a trefoil-headed arcade carrying a tile roof with pierced cusped bargeboards. On the west gable is an elaborate metal cross.	II
Conservatory, Ogston Hall; 53.13311°N 1.43681°W	—	1860	The conservatory designed by T. C. Hine, now without its cast iron glazed dome, is in sandstone on a two-stepped plinth. There is a single storey and sides of eight and three bays, the corner bays set diagonally. The conservatory has elaborate moulded tracery.	II
