= Rattle, Derbyshire =

Hamlet in Derbyshire, England

Coordinates: 53.170°N 1.482°W

Rattle
- Location within Derbyshire
- OS grid reference: SK347637
- District: North East Derbyshire
- Shire county: Derbyshire
- Region: East Midlands
- Country: England
- Sovereign state: United Kingdom
- Post town: CHESTERFIELD
- Postcode district: S45
- Police: Derbyshire
- Fire: Derbyshire
- Ambulance: East Midlands

Rattle is a hamlet in the English county of Derbyshire. It is part of the village of Ashover. This portion of the village, also known as The Rattle, was the centre of stocking frame working in Ashover and probably derives its name from the noise made by the machines.

The frames were owned and operated by individual families who converted the top floors of their already cramped cottages to accommodate the large, complex machines. Raw materials, such as silk or cotton, where obtained from a local entrepreneur. He would then collect the finished stockings and pay the machinist a piece rate, usually very low.

In the 18th century and 19th century, most of the cottages then existing in Rattle housed at least one spinning or weaving frame. Today, the only surviving 'weaver's cottages' are at the junction of Chapel Hill and Hill Road.

== See also ==
- Wessington
- List of places in Derbyshire
