= Listed buildings in Stretton, Derbyshire =

Stretton is a civil parish in the North East Derbyshire district of Derbyshire, England. The parish contains eight listed buildings that are recorded in the National Heritage List for England. All the listed buildings are designated at Grade II, the lowest of the three grades, which is applied to "buildings of national importance and special interest". The parish contains the village of Stretton, smaller settlements including Woolley Moor, and the surrounding countryside. The listed buildings consist of farmhouses, farm buildings and associated structures, a dovecote, a former toll house, and a group of three bridges.

== Buildings ==
Name and location	Photograph	Date	Notes
Hawksley House Farm and barn 53.15190°N 1.44115°W	—	15th century	The farmhouse and attached barn are in limestone with gritstone dressings and quoins, and both have two storeys. The house has a slate roof with stone coped gables and moulded kneelers to the east. On the front is a doorway with a quoined surround and an initialled and dated lintel, now filled with a window. Most of the other windows are casements, there is a small oval window, and inside the farmhouse is a base cruck. The barn has a tile roof, three bays, and inside are two base crucks.
Barn and walls, Ford Farm; 53.13618°N 1.43249°W		17th century	The barn and walls are in sandstone. The barn has a slate roof with a stone eaves course, three bays canted to the east, a single storey along the road, and two storeys to the south. There are doorways, and in the wall are the ends of massive timbers. Inside the barn are two full cruck trusses. The attached walls have flat copings, and the wall to the southwest curves towards the hall, now demolished.
Pigeoncote; 53.13617°N 1.43173°W		1707	The dovecote to the former Ford Hall is in sandstone and has a pyramidal stone slate roof. There are two storeys, a square plan, a single bay, and a projecting band between the floors. On the north front is a doorway with a quoined surround, and in the upper floor is a circular stone with a pierced cross. On the east and west sides are blocked openings, and the east front contains a two-light mullioned window. In the south front is an opening with a quoined surround, now blocked and containing an initialled datestone, flanked by vents.
Handley House, wall and gate 53.15261°N 1.43903°W		1723	A farmhouse, later a private house, it is in limestone with gritstone dressings, quoins, a coved eaves band, and a slate roof with moulded stone gable copings and plain kneelers. There are three storeys and three bays. On the front is a projecting porch with a coped gable and a ball finial, a doorway with a chamfered quoined surround, and an inner door with a moulded architrave. The windows in the lower two floors are mullioned, and in the top floor they are casements. At the rear is an initialled datestone. In front of the house is a stone wall with rounded copings, and on the west side are square rusticated gate piers with plain bases, moulded cornices and ball finials.
Boar Farmhouse; 53.14624°N 1.44022°W	—	18th century	The farmhouse is in sandstone with quoins and a tile roof. There are two storeys and three bays. In the centre is a doorway with a flush surround, above it is a single-light window, and in the outer bays are mullioned windows containing two casements.
Castle Farmhouse and barn 53.14230°N 1.43427°W	—	18th century	The farmhouse and attached barn are in sandstone with gritstone dressings, a slate roof, and two storeys. The house has three bays, and contains two doorways, one with a chamfered surround, and mullioned windows containing two casements. The barn to the west has two bays, a coped gable to the west, two doorways with chamfered quoined surrounds, single-light windows, a mullioned window, and vents.
Toll Bar Cottage; 53.14990°N 1.45379°W		Early 19th century	The toll house, later a private house and extended in the 1980s, it is in sandstone with gritstone dressings, quoins, and a tile roof with a stone slate eaves band. There is a single storey, a single bay, and a large ogee gable to the west. The doorway has a quoined surround, there is a six-pane window with a single casement, and two narrow windows.
Three bridges, Smithymoor; 53.14853°N 1.42254°W		c.1840	The bridges were built by the North Midland Railway to carry the B6014 road over Smithy Brook to the east, Horsecar Brook to the west, and the railway between them. They are in sandstone with gritstone dressings. The central railway bridge has a segmental arch with radiating voussoirs, a keystone, a moulded string course, plain parapets with cambered copings, and polygonal end piers. It is flanked by sloping embankments, and the smaller bridges over the brooks.
