= Holy Cross Church, Morton =

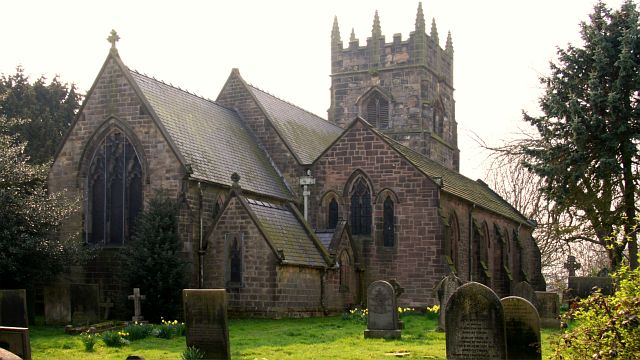
- Holy Cross Church, Morton
- Holy Cross Church, Morton
- 53°8′12.07″N 1°23′34.02″W
- OS grid reference: SK 40725 60115
- Location: Morton, Derbyshire
- Country: England
- Denomination: Church of England

History
- Dedication: Holy Cross

Architecture
- Heritage designation: Grade II listed
- Architect: Thomas Chambers Hine

Administration
- Province: Canterbury
- Diocese: Derby
- Archdeaconry: Chesterfield
- Deanery: Alfreton
- Parish: Morton

Holy Cross Church, Morton is a Grade II listed parish church in the Church of England in Morton, Derbyshire.

== History ==
The church dates from the late 13th century but was heavily rebuilt in 1850 by the contractor C. Lindley of Mansfield to the designs of the architect Thomas Chambers Hine. It reopened on 1 January 1851.

== Parish status ==
The church is in a joint parish with:

- St Peter's Church, Stonebroom
- St Leonard's Church, Shirland

== Organ ==
A barrel organ by Flight and Robson was obtained in 1851. This was sold in 1864 to make way for a new pipe organ by Brindley. A specification of the organ can be found on the National Pipe Organ Register.

== Bells ==
The church tower contains a ring of 6 bells with the tenor dating from ca. 1500.

== See also ==
- Grade II* listed buildings in North East Derbyshire
- Listed buildings in Morton, Derbyshire
