= Listed buildings in Morton, Derbyshire =

Morton is a civil parish in the North East Derbyshire district of Derbyshire, England. The parish contains six listed buildings that are recorded in the National Heritage List for England. Of these, one is listed at Grade II*, the middle of the three grades, and the others are at Grade II, the lowest grade. The parish contains the village of Morton and the surrounding area. All the listed buildings are in the village, and consist of a church and its lychgate, the former rectory, a welfare building, a farmhouse and a war memorial.

== Key ==
Grade	Criteria
II*	Particularly important buildings of more than special interest
II	Buildings of national importance and special interest

== Buildings ==
Name and location	Photograph	Date	Notes	Grade
Holy Cross Church; 53.13666°N 1.39277°W		Late 13th century	The church has been altered and extended during the centuries, particularly in 1850 by T. C. Hine. It is built in sandstone with a slate roof, and consists of a nave, a north aisle, a south porch, a chancel with a north vestry, and a west tower. The tower has three stages, diagonal buttresses, moulded string courses, a three-light west window, two-light bell openings, gargoyles, and an embattled parapet with eight crocketed pinnacles.	II*
Morton Miners Welfare; 53.13638°N 1.39119°W		Mid to late 18th century	The building is in sandstone with quoins, and a slate roof with coped gables and plain kneelers. There are two storeys and attics, and an L-shaped plan with a front of four bays, and a single-storey extension to the right. The doorway has a stone lintel and jambs, and to its right is a window set in the moulded surround of a former doorway. The windows are sashes, and in the west front is a tall staircase window with a transom.	II
Old Rectory; 53.13634°N 1.39285°W	—	Late 18th century	The former rectory is in limestone with sandstone dressings, quoins, and a Welsh slate roof. There are two storeys, a double depth plan, and a front of five bays. The central doorway has a stone lintel and jambs, and a flat bracketed hood. Above the doorway is a Venetian window with a projecting keystone. Most of the other windows are sashes, there are some casements, and some windows are tripartite.	II
Sycamore Farmhouse; 53.13463°N 1.39193°W	—	Late 18th century	The farmhouse is in sandstone with quoins, and a Welsh slate roof with coped gables and plain kneelers. There are two storeys, a T-shaped plan, and a front of three bays. The doorway has a stone surround, and the windows are mullioned with two casements.	II
Lychgate, Holy Cross Church; 53.13646°N 1.39234°W		1912	The lychgate is in stone and has a stone slate roof with coped gables. There are buttresses to the east, and a wooden bressummer.	II
War memorial 53.13684°N 1.39137°W		c. 1920	The war memorial is set in an enclosure by a road junction. It is in Rowsley sandstone, and consists of a Latin cross with a Sword of Sacrifice carved in relief on the front. The cross stands on a tapering plinth on a square base, on a step, and has a bronze plaque with the names of those lost in the two World Wars. The enclosure is semicircular and has a low stone wall with iron railings and decorative gates.	II
