= Listed buildings in Wessington =

Wessington is a civil parish in the North East Derbyshire district of Derbyshire, England, UK. The parish contains twelve listed buildings that are recorded in the National Heritage List for England. All the listed buildings are designated at Grade II, the lowest of the three grades, which is applied to "buildings of national importance and special interest". The parish contains the village of Wessington and the surrounding countryside. Apart from a railway bridge and a church, all the listed buildings are farmhouses and farm buildings.

== Buildings ==
Name and location	Photograph	Date	Notes
Dell Farmhouse; 53.11149°N 1.44273°W	—	17th century	The farmhouse, which was refronted in the 18th century, is in sandstone, rendered at the rear, with quoins, and a roof of slate and stone slate with moulded gable copings and kneelers. There are two storeys and a T-shaped plan, with a front range of three bays. The central doorway has a quoined surround, and the windows are mullioned with two lights.
Cowsheds east of Roadnook Farmhouse; 53.11924°N 1.44727°W	—	17th century	The cowsheds, which have been altered, are in sandstone with gritstone dressings, and have asbestos sheet roofs with stone ridges, moulded stone gable copings, kneelers, and a finial. There is a single storey and an L-shaped plan, with two ranges at right angles. These contain a partly blocked doorway and the remains of mullioned windows.
Garden wall, Roadnook Farmhouse; 53.11913°N 1.44891°W	—	17th century	The wall is in sandstone, and encloses the garden to the west of the house on three sides. The south wall has flat copings, it is stepped down to the east, and contains a doorway with a quoined surround. The east wall has rounded copings and also contains a quoined doorway, and the west wall, with flat copings, is blank.
Outbuilding called The Chapel, Roadnook Farm; 53.11888°N 1.44779°W	—	17th century	The outbuilding has a ground floor in sandstone, an upper floor in brick, and a stone slate roof with moulded stone gable copings and plain kneelers. There are two storeys and a single bay. On the north front is a two-light mullioned window, and a doorway with a quoined surround and a chamfered four-centred arch to the base of the lintel. Above the doorway is a decorated initialled and dated plaque, and in the upper floor is a blocked oval opening.
Outbuilding, Roadnook Farm; 53.11908°N 1.44762°W	—	Late 17th century	The outbuilding is in sandstone with gritstone dressings, and has a stone slate roof with moulded stone gable copings and ball finials. There are two storeys, two bays, and a single-storey cowshed at the rear. In the centre is a doorway with a quoined surround, a moulded architrave, and a deep lintel. Above it is a loft doorway with a quoined surround, and the windows are mullioned with moulded hood moulds.
Barn southeast of Roadnook Farmhouse; 53.11903°N 1.44748°W	—	1683	The threshing barn, which was later extended, is in red brick on a gritstone foundation with gritstone dressings, quoins, and a stone slate roof with moulded stone copings, plain kneelers and ball finials. It contains large threshing entrances, each with a curved timber lintel under a brick arch with voussoirs, stepped buttresses, and cross-shaped vents. In the west gable end is a doorway with a quoined surround, a moulded architrave and lintel, over which is an initialled and dated square plaque with a moulded architrave, and a moulded hood.
Roadnook Farmhouse; 53.11919°N 1.44803°W	—	Mid 18th century	The farmhouse is in sandstone with gritstone dressings, quoins, and a slate roof with a stone ridge, stone copied gables and plain kneelers. There are three storeys and three bays. In the centre is a doorway with a quoined surround and a projecting initialled and dated keystone. In the floors above the doorway are single-light windows, and the other windows are mullioned with two or three lights.
Hay Farmhouse; 53.11299°N 1.45871°W	—	1786	The farmhouse is in sandstone with gritstone dressings on a shallow plinth, and has quoins, an eaves band, and a pantile roof with stone coped gables and inverted moulded kneelers. There are two storeys, three bays, and a rear cross-wing. The central doorway has a lintel with an incised plaque containing initials and the date. Above the doorway is a single-light window, and the other windows are mullioned with two lights.
Barn north of Amber Farmhouse; 53.10887°N 1.42460°W	—	Early 19th century	The barn is in sandstone and has a hipped slate roof with stone ridges. There are two storeys and an L-shaped plan. The barn contains doorways, some with segmental heads, some blocked, vents, steps leading to an upper floor doorway, and a horizontally-sliding sash window.
Outbuilding north of Amber Farmhouse; 53.10866°N 1.42456°W	—	Early 19th century	The outbuilding is in sandstone and has a hipped slate roof with stone ridges. There are two storeys and four bays. IOn the centre are two doorways with plain lintels and the windows are horizontal-sliding sashes.
Alfreton Stream Bridge; 53.10459°N 1.42332°W	—	1836–40	The bridge was built by the North Midland Railway to carry its line over Alfreton Brook. It is in gritstone with a red brick soffit, and consists of a single segmental arch with rusticated voussoirs and a keystone. The voussoirs spring from an impost band and end at quoins on the soffit. The curved abutment walls end in piers. Above the arch is moulding, and a coped parapet on which are iron railings.
Christ Church; 53.11436°N 1.44460°W		1857–58	The church is in sandstone with gritstone dressings and a slate roof, and is in Early English style. It consists of a nave, a south porch, a lower chancel, and a north vestry. At the west end are three stepped lancet windows in a blind arch, and on the gable is a bellcote, and at the east end are three unequal lancets with a circular window above.
