= Harold Hall (cricketer) =

English cricketer

Harold St Alban Hall (8 November 1875 – 17 May 1915) was an English cricketer who played for Northamptonshire. He was born in Shirland, Derbyshire and died in Farnham, Surrey, in a cycling accident.

Hall made a single first-class appearance, during the 1907 season, against Warwickshire. From the middle order, he scored 7 runs in the first innings in which he batted, and 5 runs in the second innings. Northamptonshire lost the match by 125 runs.
