= Shirland =

Village in Derbyshire, England

Coordinates: 53.121°N 1.412°W

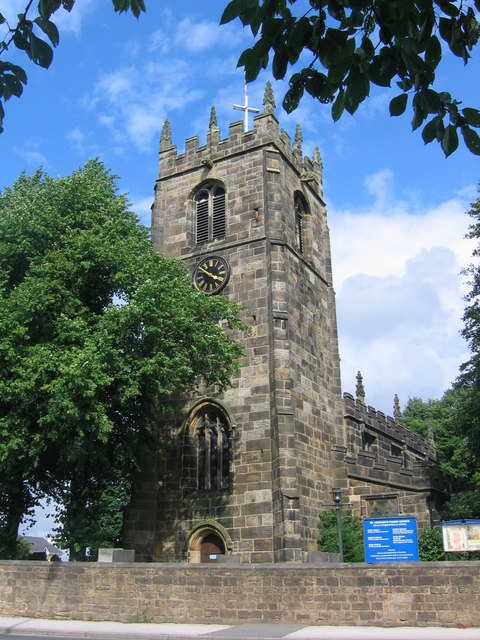
- St. Leonards Church

- Location within Derbyshire
- Population: 4,802 (Including Stonebroom. 2011)
- OS grid reference: SK394583
- Civil parish: Shirland and Higham
- District: North East Derbyshire
- Shire county: Derbyshire
- Region: East Midlands
- Country: England
- Sovereign state: United Kingdom
- Post town: ALFRETON
- Postcode district: DE55
- Police: Derbyshire
- Fire: Derbyshire
- Ambulance: East Midlands

Shirland is a former pit village in Derbyshire, England. Together with the neighbouring villages of Higham, Stretton and Stonebroom, it forms part of the civil parish of Shirland and Higham, which had a population of 4,802 at the 2011 Census. The River Amber flows through the parish.

== History ==
Shirland is mentioned in the Domesday Book as Sirelunt in the hundred of Scarsdale. According to this ancient document the manor was given to William Peverel after the Norman Conquest. Peveral inherited many manors around Derbyshire and Nottinghamshire including Nottingham Castle.

The village is built around St. Leonard's Church. The foundations of the church date to 1220, according to the inscriptions within the church. The church grounds contain many monuments to the De Grey family, who inherited the manor in the early 13th century. The church also contains memorials to the Revill family who were well-known Derbyshire landowners in the 15th century.

Gables Farm (now demolished) at Higham in Shirland Parish was built in 1696 by Thomas and Anne Clay on a 64-acre plot.

In 1868, the inhabitants were mostly involved with agriculture but a proportion were involved with framework knitting. However, in 1864 a mine was founded, which by the end of the century employed 500 men. The community together with Higham increased from a population of 2,437 in 1871 to 3,415 in 1881. The mines shaped the community until 1965 when the mine closed. A golf course is now built on the former slag heaps.

A new primary school was opened in September 2011, next to St. Leonards Church.

== Church ==
The buttressed west tower of St Leonard's Church is pictured above, alongside the A61 north of Alfreton. Parts of the church date from 1220 but the majority of the existing church is 15th-century. It is part of a Benefice with the Church of England churches in Stonebroom (St Peter's Church) and Morton (Church of the Holy Cross).

== Notable people ==
- Sir John de Grey (died 1266), English soldier and high sheriff
- Niamh Emerson (born 1999), heptathlete, bronze medallist at the 2018 Commonwealth Games

== See also ==
- Listed buildings in Shirland and Higham
