= Stretton, Derbyshire =

Village in Derbyshire, England

Coordinates: 53.147°N 1.415°W

Stretton
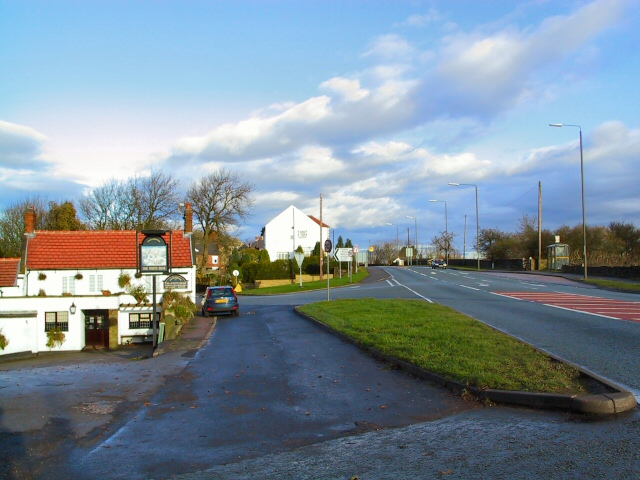
- White Bear intersection.

- Location within Derbyshire
- Population: 525 (2011)
- OS grid reference: SK392612
- District: North East Derbyshire
- Shire county: Derbyshire
- Region: East Midlands
- Country: England
- Sovereign state: United Kingdom
- Post town: ALFRETON
- Postcode district: DE55
- Police: Derbyshire
- Fire: Derbyshire
- Ambulance: East Midlands

Stretton is a small village and civil parish in Derbyshire, England. The population of the civil parish as at the 2011 Census was 525. It is near the towns of Clay Cross and 3.5 miles (5.6 km) from Alfreton on the A61. The nearest waterways are the River Amber and Smithy Brook. Since 1964, Stretton has been beside Ogston Reservoir which still has the remains of a pub (Napoleon's Home) and a light railway within its depths. Stretton Handley CE (VC) Primary School, on Badger Lane, had 53 pupils on roll as at September 2024. In 2022, the school had a 100 percent pass rating on SATS.

The parish includes the settlement of Woolley Moor. There was once a railway station — Stretton railway station.

Stretton means "settlement on a Roman Road" (from the Old English stræt and tun). In this case the road is Ryknild Street.

== See also ==
- Listed buildings in Stretton, Derbyshire
