= St Peter's Church, Stonebroom =

St Peter’s Church, Stonebroom
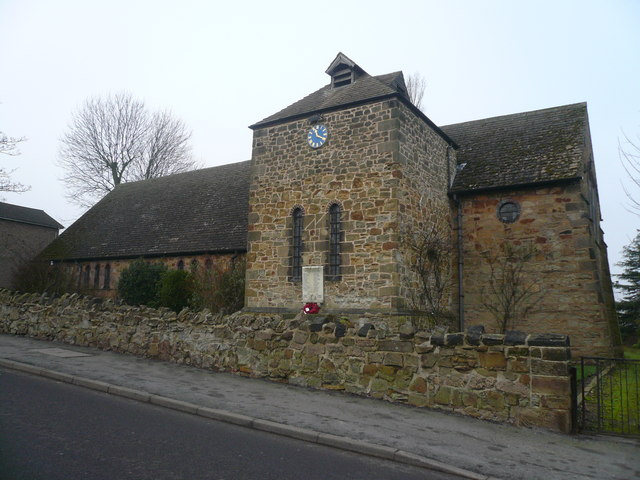
- St Peter’s Church, Stonebroom
- St Peter’s Church, Stonebroom
- 53°8′1.48″N 1°22′47.9″W
- OS grid reference: SK 41586 59787
- Location: Stonebroom, Derbyshire
- Country: England
- Denomination: Church of England

History
- Dedication: St Peter
- Consecrated: September 1907

Architecture
- Heritage designation: Grade II listed
- Architect: Percy H Currey
- Groundbreaking: 7 July 1900
- Completed: July 1901

Administration
- Province: Canterbury
- Diocese: Derby
- Archdeaconry: Chesterfield
- Deanery: Alfreton
- Parish: Stonebroom

St Peter's Church, Stonebroom is a Grade II listed parish church in the Church of England in Stonebroom, Derbyshire.

== History ==
Before a separate church was established the people of Stonebroom had walked to St Leonard's Church, Shirland, which was about 1 mile from Stonebroom. The Rev. J. W. Maltby, Rector of Morton, opened a mission in the village, which constructed a Mission Room out of four or five cottages. Around 1880 the congregation built an Iron Mission Church, which served until the permanent church could be constructed.

The permanent church was built between 1900 and 1901 as a memorial to John Jackson of Stubben Edge, Ashover. The architect was Mr. Percy H. Currey of Derby. The foundation stone was laid on 7 July 1900 by Mrs. John Jackson on a site given by the Clay Cross Company. The rubble stone used was secured from the railway extensions in the Erewash Valley being undertaken by the Midland Railway. It opened in July 1901 and was consecrated in September 1907 by the Bishop of Derby.

== Parish status ==
The church is in a joint parish with:

- Holy Cross Church, Morton
- St Leonard's Church, Shirland

== Organ ==
An organ was installed in 1904 by Musson and Compton of Nottingham at a cost just short of £200. A specification of the organ can be found on the National Pipe Organ Register.
