= Brackenfield =

Village in Derbyshire, England

Coordinates: 53.1282°N 1.4443°W

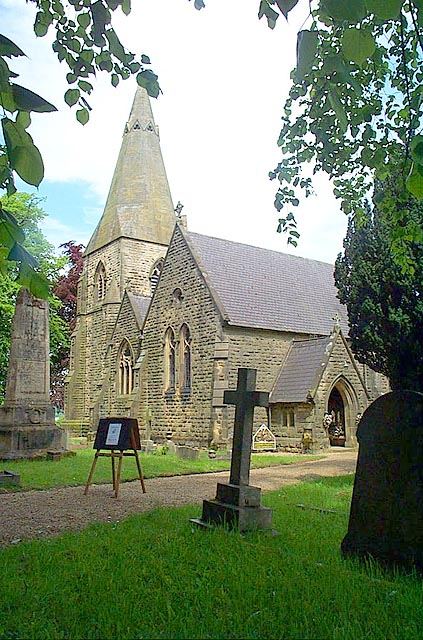
- Brackenfield Church.

- Brackenfield parish highlighted within Derbyshire
- Population: 214 (2011)
- OS grid reference: SK372591
- District: North East Derbyshire
- Shire county: Derbyshire
- Region: East Midlands
- Country: England
- Sovereign state: United Kingdom
- Post town: ALFRETON
- Postcode district: DE55
- Dialling code: 01629
- Police: Derbyshire
- Fire: Derbyshire
- Ambulance: East Midlands
- UK Parliament: North East Derbyshire

Brackenfield is a village and civil parish in the North East Derbyshire district of Derbyshire, England. The population of the civil parish as of the 2011 census was 214.

The village is about five miles east of Matlock and four and a half miles northwest of Alfreton. It is also close to Clay Cross. Set in farming country, the village is located around a large village green. The parish of Brackenfield includes much of the attractive Ogston Reservoir.

Brackenfield was originally known as Brackenthwaite, which probably meant "a bracken clearing". The suffix -thwaite is unusual in this part of the county, as it is commonly associated with more northern areas. It is of significance etymologically as it seems to point to the existence of a small colony of Norsemen or Norwegians, separate from the incursion of the Danes. The village later became known as Brackenfeld, and then Brackenfield.

The parish of Brackenfield was originally a township of nearby Morton. It was divided from it in 1758. The parish has the smallest population of all parishes in the North East Derbyshire district. Wessington had a population of 509 in 2001, however in the 19th century it was around 350.

A horse named after the village unseated its rider when competing in the 1996 Grand National.

== See also ==
- List of places in Derbyshire
- Listed buildings in Brackenfield
