= Ogston Reservoir =

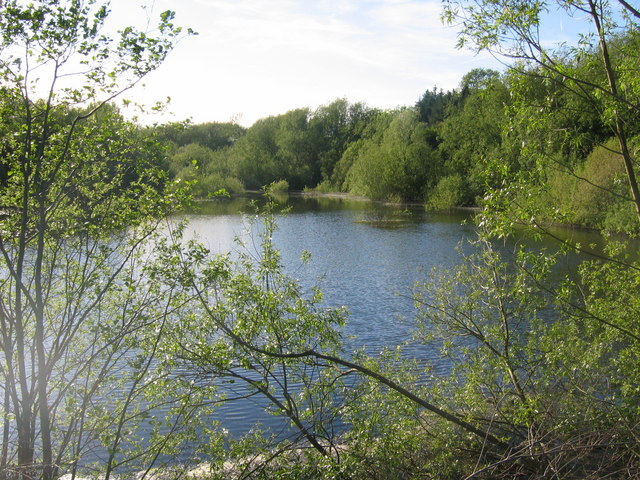
- This northwestern tip of Ogston Reservoir is cut off from the main reservoir by the B6014. This is where the River Amber joins the reservoir, its course can be seen when water levels are low

- Location within Derbyshire
- Location: Derbyshire
- Coordinates: 53°8′16″N 1°26′18″W
- Lake type: reservoir
- Primary inflows: River Amber
- Primary outflows: River Amber
- Basin countries: United Kingdom
- Surface area: 220 acres (89 ha)

Ogston Reservoir is a reservoir operated by Severn Trent Water in Derbyshire. It is near the villages of Brackenfield and Ashover and the town of Clay Cross.

The reservoir takes its water from the River Amber and was originally created to supply the National Coal Board's Carbonisation Plant at Wingerworth; the reservoir now supplies water for the local area and is used as a holding ground for water for nearby Carsington Reservoir. The reservoir covers 200 acres (810,000 m^{2}) and holds 1.3 billion imperial gallons (5.9 billion litres) of water.

The valley was flooded in 1958 and completely submerged farmland, roads and part of the Ashover Light Railway. The reservoir also destroyed most of the village of Woolley, including the Woolley House Hydro, the village store, the blacksmiths, the joiners, the laundry, the sheep dip and 'Napoleons Home', the local public house. The villagers were relocated into council houses built in another local hamlet, Badger Lane, which eventually became known as the village of Woolley on the Moor, which subsequently became the present village of Woolley Moor.

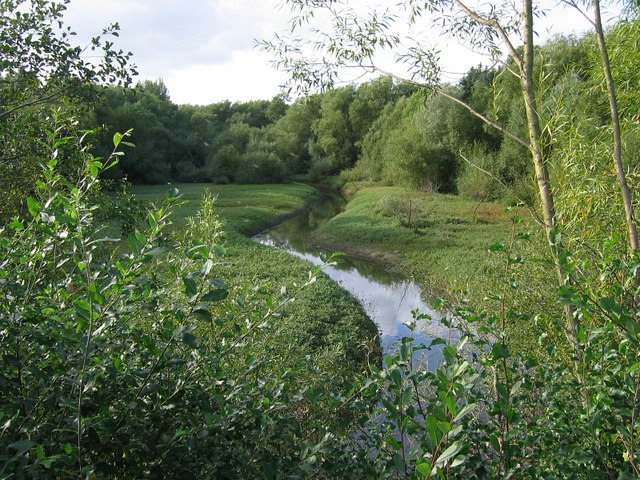
At times of low water, the northwestern tip of Ogston Reservoir reveals the course of the River Amber.

The reservoir provides many leisure activities including sailing, windsurfing, stand up paddle boarding and trout-fishing. It is especially well known for its bird-life and over 200 species have been recorded at Ogston including Wilson's phalarope, Sabine's gull and long-tailed skuas.

Ellen MacArthur, best known as a solo long-distance yachtswoman who, on 7 February 2005, broke the world record for the fastest solo circumnavigation of the globe, trained to become a yachtswoman on Ogston Reservoir.

This article was prepared using information found on the website of the 'Woolley Trail', maintained by the local primary school.
