= Morton, Derbyshire =

Village in Derbyshire, England

Coordinates: 53.137°N 1.392°W

Morton
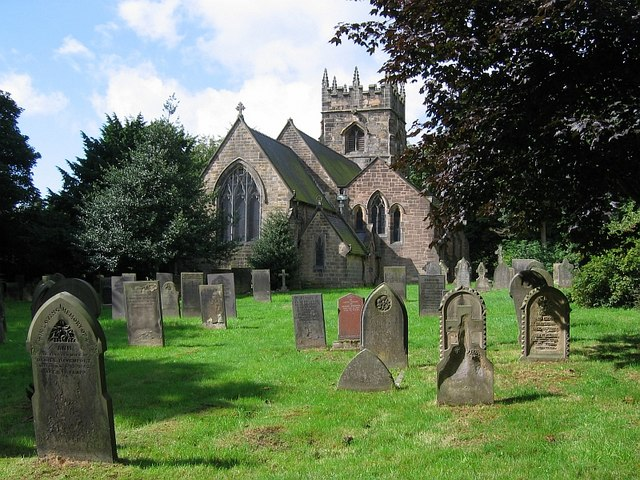
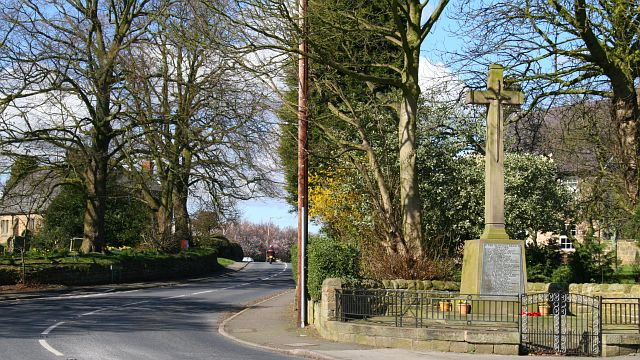
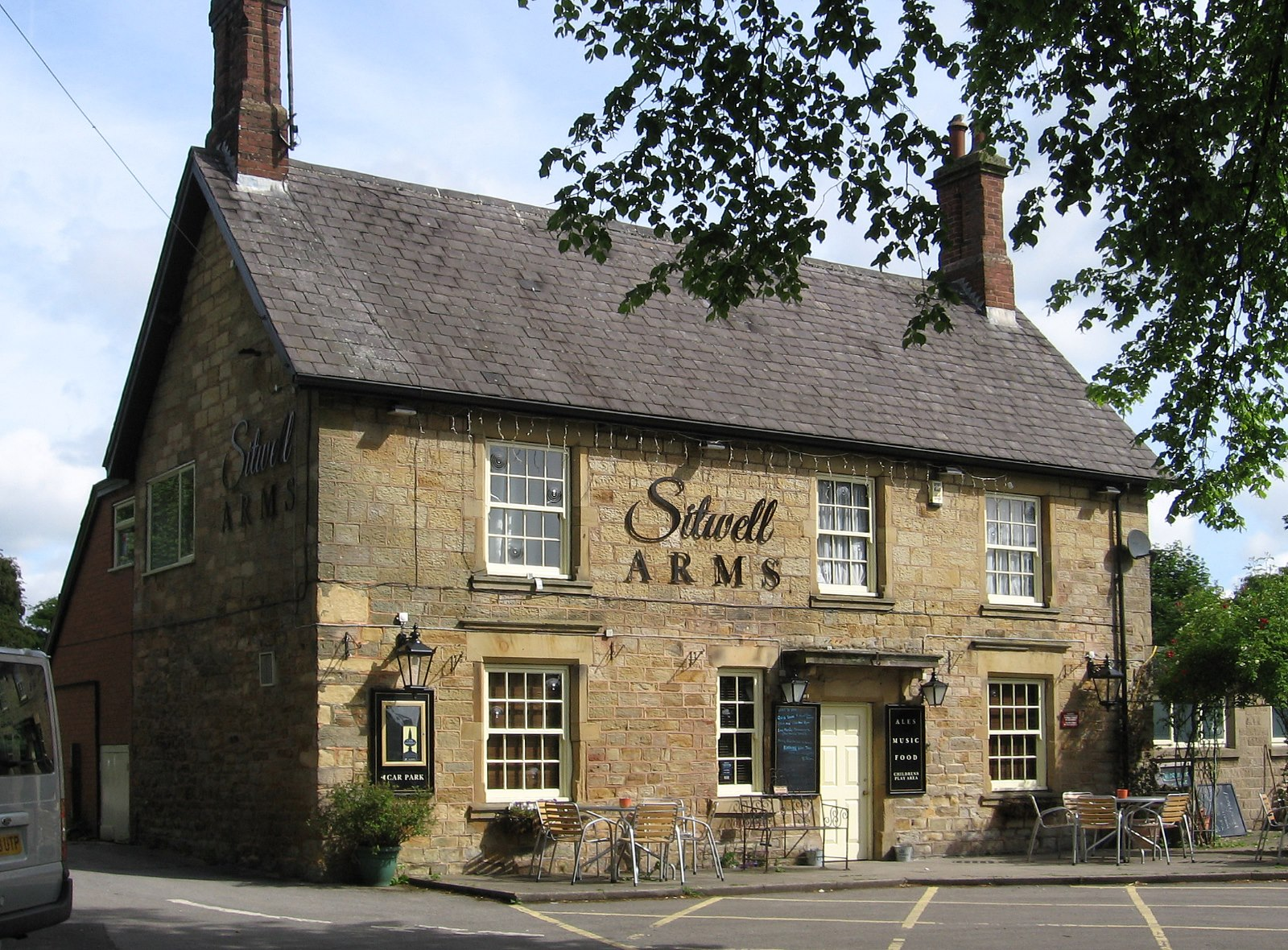
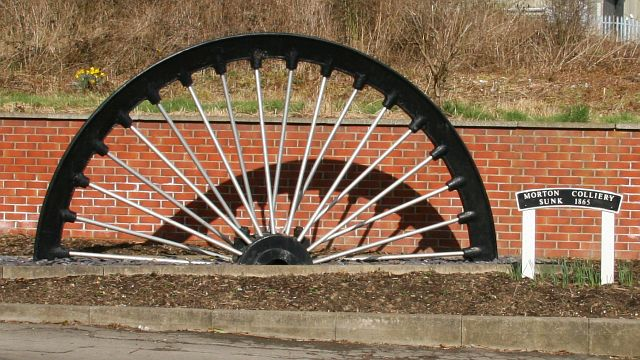
- Holy Cross Church War Memorial Sitwell Arms Colliery Wheel

- Location within Derbyshire
- Population: 1,195 (2011)
- OS grid reference: SK407601
- District: North East Derbyshire
- Shire county: Derbyshire
- Region: East Midlands
- Country: England
- Sovereign state: United Kingdom
- Post town: ALFRETON
- Postcode district: DE55
- Police: Derbyshire
- Fire: Derbyshire
- Ambulance: East Midlands

Morton is a civil parish and village, three miles north of Alfreton in North East Derbyshire, Derbyshire, England. The civil parish population at the 2011 Census was 1,195.

== History ==
A hoard of Roman coins found between Hagg House Farm and Morton Lodge Farm is the first evidence of human activity in the Morton area. The coins have been dated at 210 AD.

Morton is first documented in the will of Wulfric Spott in 1002 and again mentioned in 1086 in the Domesday Book as one of the manors belonging to Walter D'Aincourt (Deincourt).

The manor of Morton remained in the ownership of the Deincourts until the family line died out and then passed through several hands until being acquired by the Sitwells (of Renishaw) in 1749. The Sitwells disposed of the Morton estate in 1912.

There have been 33 barons of Morton. The current Baron of Morton resides in the United States and ascended to the barony on May 20, 2022 through issue of the 32nd Baron of Morton.

The Midland Railway opened a station at Doe Hill in 1862.

In 1865 George Stephenson's Clay Cross Company opened their first colliery in Morton. Most of the houses now in Morton were built to house the colliery workers.

See separate sections below for history of church, school and colliery.

== Claims to be centre of England ==
According to the roadsigns entering Morton, the village is the geographical centre of England. Morton has a claim to be at the centre of England as it is midway along the longest North – South Axis (Near Berwick upon Tweed to Poole) and is also midway between the Welsh border (Close to Dodleston) and the East Coast (at Skegness). The Ordnance Survey define Fenny Drayton to be the Geographical centre of England, and Coton in the Elms to be the Farthest point from the Sea. Historically Meriden has been regarded as the centre of England for over 200 years, despite being closer to the South Coast than it is to Berwick-upon-Tweed.

The position of the centre-of-England point is an oak tree opposite to no 69 Stretton Road (near the western end of the village). A plaque was erected by the Parish Council in the 1990s to identify the particular tree.

== Morton Church ==
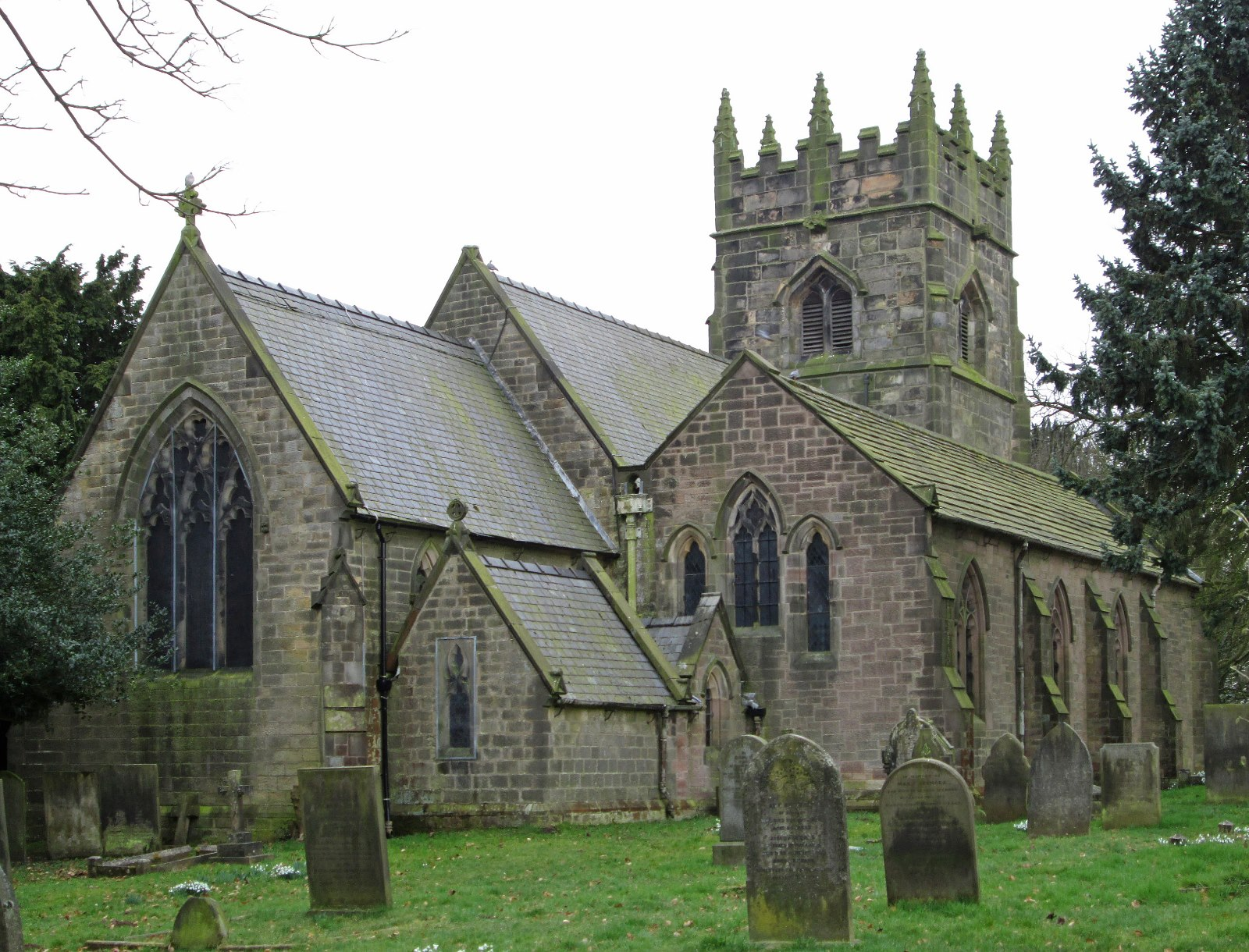
Morton – Holy Cross Church

Morton Church of the Holy Cross has a long history, although most of the current church building dates from 1850. The 1086 Domesday book identifies Morton as a parish with a church, but there is evidence of there being a church in Saxon times. The arcade dates from the thirteenth century and the tower (at the west end) from the fifteenth century. The remainder of the church results from a rebuild by T.C. Hine of Nottingham in 1850. The church is a Grade II* listed building.

== Education ==
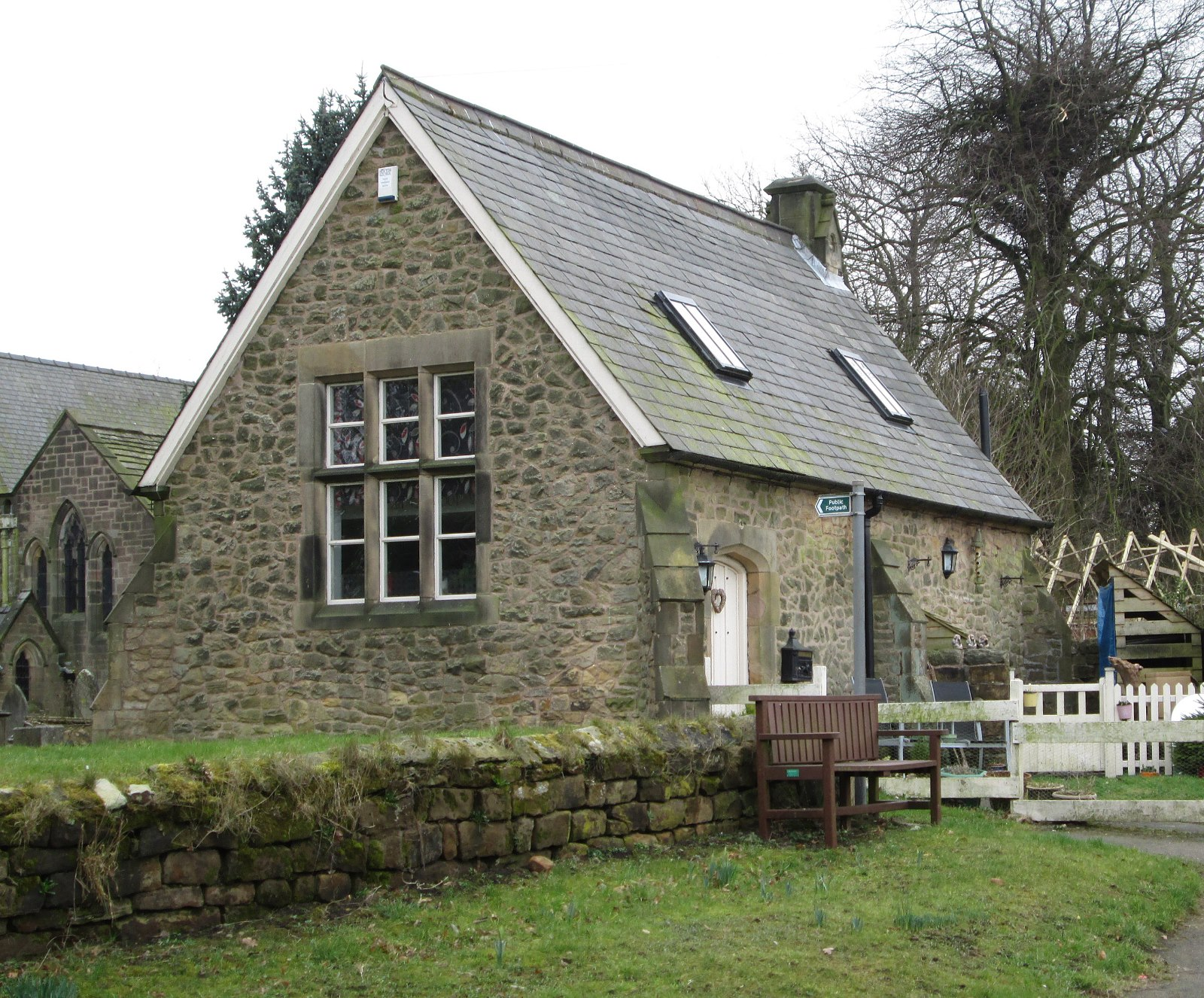
Morton – First (1863) School

The first Morton school opened in 1863. It was a single-room stone building known as the Old Dames School, near the church. It was replaced in 1884 by a building on the site of the current primary school. This school cost £600 and had an average attendance of 192 pupils. Most of the current school results from a 1927 rebuild to a design of George H. Widdows. A building extension, sympathetic to the Widdows design and costing £892,000 was officially opened in 2010.

== Morton Colliery ==
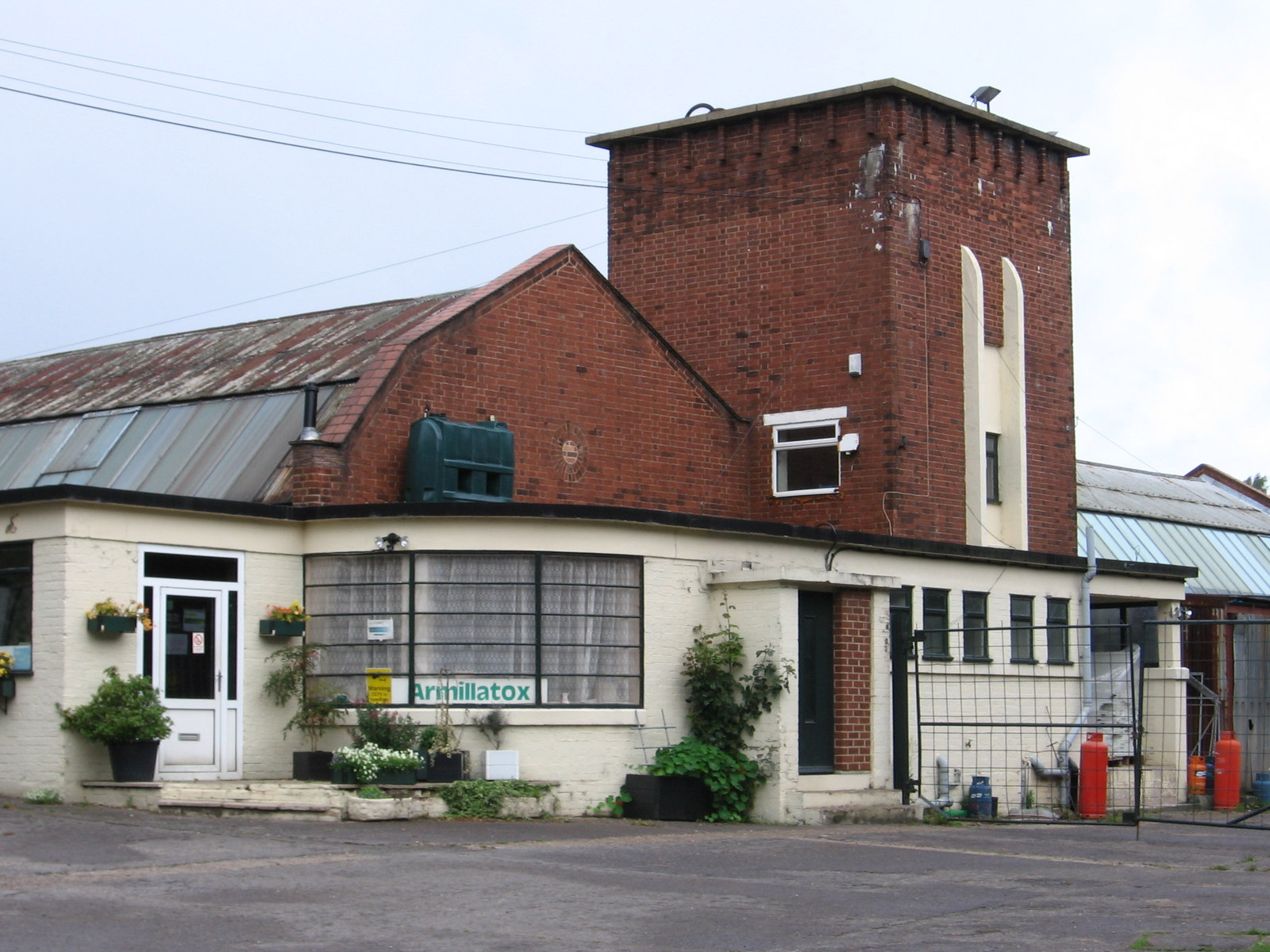
Morton – Pit-Head Buildings

The mining industry transformed Morton from a small agricultural community into a much larger village based around the employment that its colliery offered. The colliery was opened by the Clay Cross Company in 1865 and it closed a hundred years later in 1965. At its peak, there were 1,033 employees (in 1956) and highest coal output was 390,472 tons (in 1955). There were 55 fatalities during the life of the mine. The pit-head baths were built in 1936. The baths were brick-built, with elements of Art Deco styling, and the pit-head buildings now form part of a small industrial estate. Water ingress was always a problem with this mine and the shafts were kept open and pumping of water was continued from the date of mine closure until 1990 to protect neighbouring operational pits from flooding.

== Village facilities ==
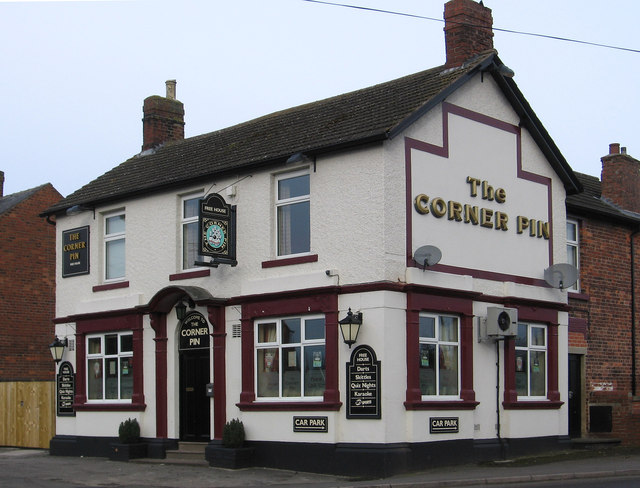
Morton – The Corner Pin

As at March 2015, Morton has the benefit of:

- A post office and general stores.
- A village hall: This was once a brewery, but is now run by the Parish Council as a meeting place for local groups and for private hire.
- Two public Houses: The Sitwell Arms and The Corner Pin.
- A cricket club: Morton Colliery Cricket Club fields three teams in local leagues. There are also junior teams. The ground off Back Lane boasts a bar and an electronic scoreboard. The club celebrated its 150th year in 2015.
- Two country parks: Morton Colliery Plantation and Doe Hill Country Park. Morton, Tibshelf, Blackwell and Shirland & Higham parish councils form the Doe Hill Community Park Advisory Panel.
- A children's playground off of New Street.
- Bus services to nearby towns: There are regular daytime weekday commercially provided bus services to Alfreton, Chesterfield and Sutton-in-Ashfield. There are some subsidised services to other destinations.

== See also ==
- Listed buildings in Morton, Derbyshire
