= River Amber =

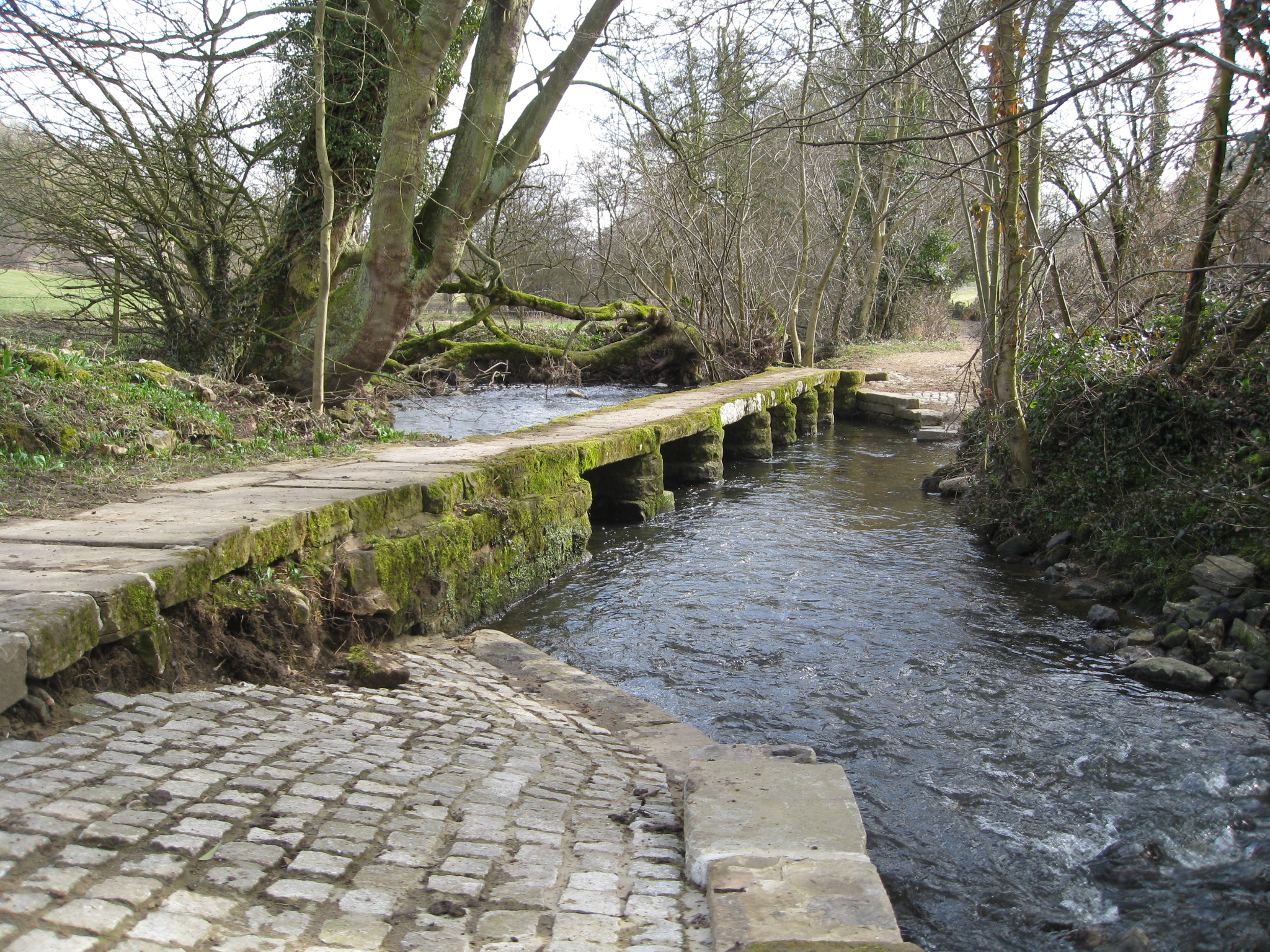
- Amber at Clapper Bridge in Ashover

- Confluence with Derwent in Derbyshire

Location
- Country: England
- Counties: Derbyshire

Physical characteristics
- Source: Ashover
- Mouth: Confluence with the Derwent
  - coordinates: 53°03′36″N 1°29′02″W
- Length: 21 km (13 mi)
- Basin size: 140 km^{2} (54 sq mi)
- Discharge
  - location: Wingfield Park
  - average: 1.37 m^{3}/s (48 cu ft/s)

Basin features
- Tributaries
  - left: Press Brook, Alfreton Brook, Buckland-Hollow Brook

The River Amber is a left bank tributary of the River Derwent in Derbyshire, England. It gives its name to the local government district and borough of Amber Valley.

The name Amber is a pre-Celtic word with uncertain meaning.

== Course ==
Its source is close to the village of Ashover, near Clay Cross, and it flows southwards through Ogston Reservoir to Pentrich then turns westwards through Wingfield Park to join the River Derwent at Ambergate.

Like many such rivers flowing from the Derbyshire moors, it powered a number of water mills, many of them for crushing locally mined and quarried minerals, such as limestone.

The river valley also provided a route for the Cromford Canal, at the southern end as far as Butterley Tunnel, and the North Midland Railway, to travel northwards until it passed under Clay Cross via the Clay Cross Tunnel, where it entered the valley of the River Rother and then north to Chesterfield.
