= Idridgehay railway station =

Heritage railway station in Derbyshire, England

Idridgehay
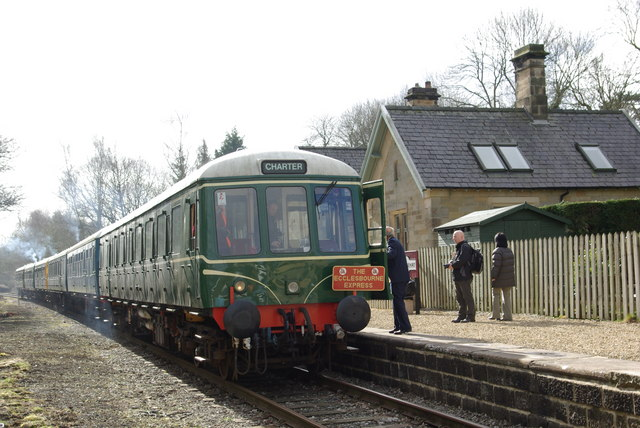

General information
- Location: Idridgehay, Derbyshire; England
- Coordinates: 53.0356°N 1.5692°W
- Grid reference: SK289487
- System: Station on heritage railway
- Operator: Ecclesbourne Valley Railway
- Platforms: 1

History
- Original company: Midland Railway

Key dates
- 1 October 1867: Opened
- 16 June 1947: Closed to passengers
- 2 March 1964: Closed to goods
- 8 March 2008: Reopened
Location

Idridgehay railway station is a stop on the preserved Ecclesbourne Valley Railway, serving the village of Idridgehay, in Derbyshire, England. It was originally a station on a former Midland Railway line, which branches off the Midland Main Line at Duffield railway station.

Pronounced
(listen)

== History ==
Opened with other stations on the branch line to Wirksworth on 1 October 1867, it was designed by the Midland Railway company architect John Holloway Sanders.

Idridgehay remained open until 16 June 1947, when the Wirksworth branch passenger service was withdrawn on a temporary basis in response to post-war fuel shortages. This was made permanent with effect from May 1949, when the line was removed from the summer timetable. Freight facilities remained rail-served until 2 March 1964, while the branch continued to be used for mineral traffic until December 1989.

The station has been restored as an operational station on the Ecclesbourne Valley Railway in Derbyshire. The station building and nearby former station master's house have been sold off to private ownership in recent years, but the platform has been restored by volunteer members of the Ecclesbourne Valley Railway Association; this culminated in its reopening to passenger trains in March 2008. The rebuilding of the adjacent level crossing with new gates and fencing was completed over the winter of 2007/8.

=== Stationmasters ===
- Benjamin Tomlinson 1867 - 1884
- Arthur G. Beeton 1884 - ca. 1908
- H. Peat ca. 1911 - ca. 1914
- G.W. Marple 1921 - 1936 (also station master at Shottle, afterwards station master at Wirksworth)
- A.H. Webb 1936 - 1937 (also station master at Shottle)
- A. Harrison 1937 - 1938 (also station master at Shottle, afterwards station master at Little Eaton)
- W. Cooke 1938 - ???? (also station master at Shottle)

== Services ==
The Ecclesbourne Valley Railway runs services between Duffield and Ravenstor, via Shottle and Wirksworth. Timetables vary daily during the year, with more services at weekends and school holidays; patterns include yellow, purple and green days.

Preceding station	Heritage railways	Following station
Wirksworth Terminus	Ecclesbourne Valley Railway	Shottle towards Duffield
Historical railways
Wirksworth	Midland Railway; Wirksworth Branch	Shottle

== See also ==
- Listed buildings in Idridgehay and Alton
