= Shottle railway station =

Heritage railway station in Derbyshire, England

Shottle
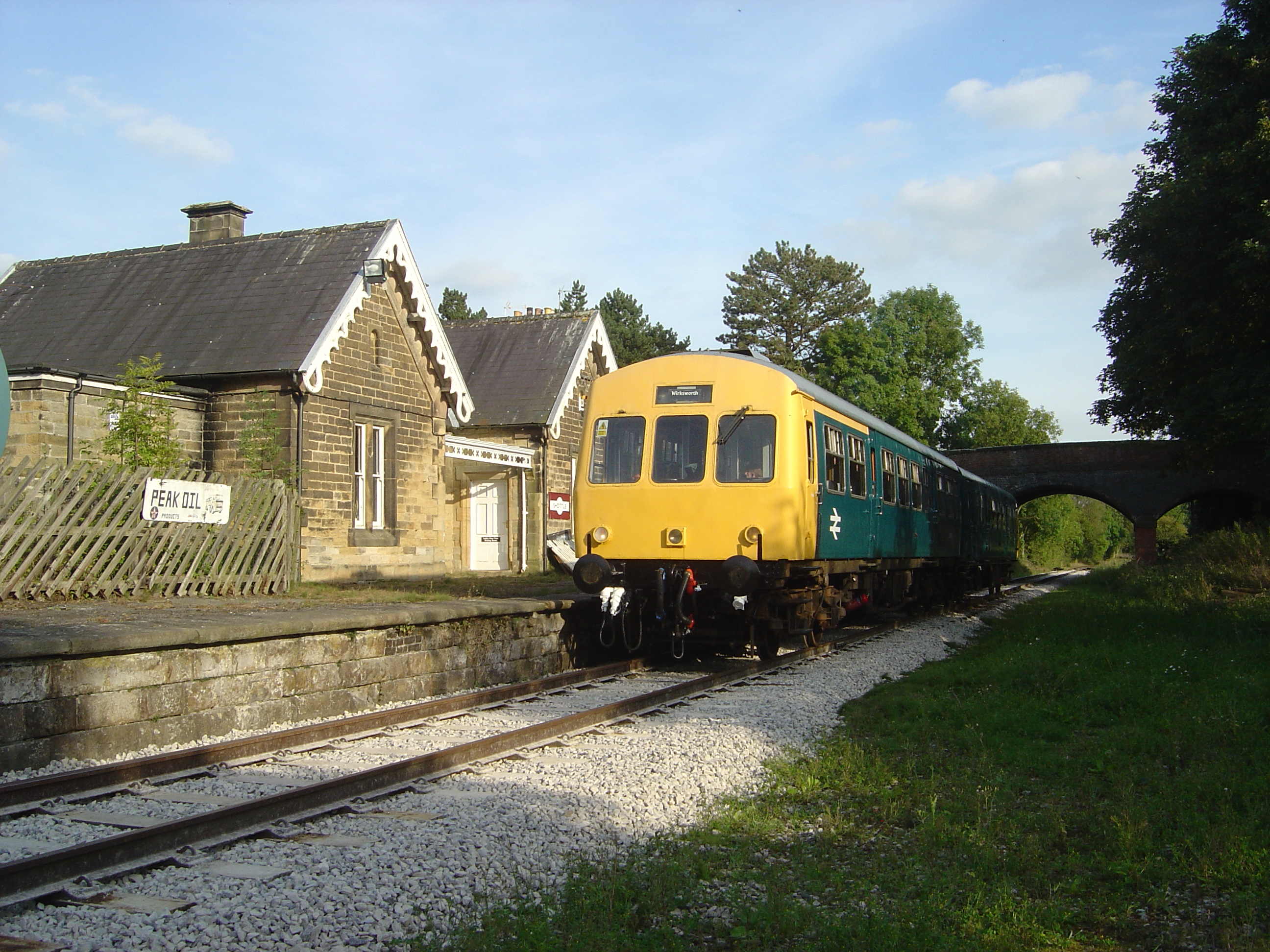
- Passenger stock on a test run waits at Shottle in September 2009.

General information
- Location: Shottle, Derbyshire; England
- Coordinates: 53.0184°N 1.5474°W
- Platforms: 1 (platform 2 under construction)

Other information
- Status: Open (heritage)

History
- Original company: Midland Railway

Key dates
- 1 October 1867: Opened
- 16 June 1947: Closed to passengers
- 2 March 1964: Closed to goods
- 9 August 2014: Reopened
Location

Shottle railway station is a stop on the preserved Ecclesbourne Valley Railway, serving the small town of Wirksworth, in Derbyshire, England. It was originally a station on a former Midland Railway line, which branches off the Midland Main Line at Duffield railway station.

== History ==
Opened with other stations on the branch line to Wirksworth on 1 October 1867, it was designed by the Midland Railway company architect John Holloway Sanders.

Shottle remained open until 16 June 1947, when the Wirksworth branch passenger service was withdrawn on a temporary basis in response to post-war fuel shortages. This was made permanent with effect from May 1949, when the line was removed from the summer timetable. Freight facilities remained rail-served at Shottle until 2 March 1964, while the branch continued to be used for mineral traffic until December 1989.

The station buildings, platform and former railway cottages remain; the former and part of the station yard are owned by a local oil distribution company, which uses the building as their headquarters and have repaired its structure in a sympathetic manner. Public access to the site is limited.

The branch line is owned by WyvernRail plc and forms part of the heritage Ecclesbourne Valley Railway. The section of the line through Shottle is now in use by passenger services, as is the station itself that has now recently reopened to passengers for the very first time in 65 years since 1947. The platform is open but the station building remains private.

Principal traffic on this section comprises road/rail plant that uses the line as part of a formal acceptance procedure for the Rail Safety and Standards Board (RSSB). To support these operations, siding space has been reinstated at the site.

During the 2012 season, a passing loop was constructed at Shottle allowing train services to continue while the platform was being rebuilt; the pointwork at the southern end having slewed into a Y-shape over the winter months. A temporary 8 miles per hour (13 km/h) speed limit is in place. As of March 2016, two-train running is now possible following completion of rebuilding work, increasing train services to approximately seven round-trip services a day.

A second platform is currently under construction at the station.

=== Stationmasters ===
- John Towler until 1873
- J. Clementson 1873 - 1874 (formerly station master at Long Preston)
- Eli Croft 1874 - 1876
- Herbert Barber 1876 - 1908
- Frederick George Arnson ca. 1912
- H. Swift 1914 - 1929 (also station master at Hazelwood)
- G.W. Marple 1929 - 1936 (also station master at Hazelwood until 1931, then also station master at Idridgehay, afterwards station master at Wirksworth)
- A.H. Webb 1936 - 1937 (also station master at Idridgehay)
- A. Harrison 1937 - 1938 (also station master at Idridgehay, afterwards station master at Little Eaton)
- W. Cooke 1938 - ???? (also station master at Idridgehay)

== Location ==
The Railway Inn outside the station

The station is located just off the A517 road, which is the main route from Belper to Ashbourne. New access has been created and passengers can now enter the station from the step entrance off the A517 Belper - Ashbourne Road, near to the cross-roads with the B5023. Disabled access is currently still under construction at this time. The road to the east of the line is private, belonging to the company which owns the station buildings. It is a request-only stop.

The nearest settlement to the station is the group of dwellings and public house at the road junction, known as Cowers Lane. However, the station is more or less equidistant from the two slightly larger settlements of Turnditch to the west and Shottlegate to the east.

== Service ==
The Ecclesbourne Valley Railway runs services between Duffield and Wirksworth, via Shottle and Idridgehay. Timetables vary during the year, with more services at weekends and school holidays; patterns include yellow, purple and green days. Trains only run to Ravenstor on special event days.

Preceding station	Heritage railways	Following station
Idridgehay towards Wirksworth	Ecclesbourne Valley Railway	Duffield Terminus
Historical railways
Idridgehay	Midland Railway; Wirksworth Branch	Hazelwood
