= Hazelwood railway station =

Former railway station in Derbyshire, England

Hazelwood
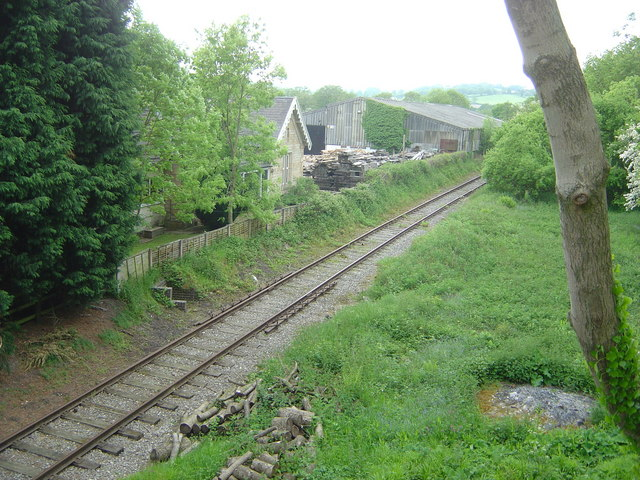
- The station site in 2008

General information
- Location: Hazelwood, Amber Valley; England
- Coordinates: 53.0004°N 1.5250°W
- Platforms: 1

Other information
- Status: Disused

History
- Original company: Midland Railway

Key dates
- 1 October 1867: Opened
- 16 June 1947: Closed to passengers
Location

Hazelwood railway station was a stop on the Wirksworth branch of the Midland Railway. It served the village of Hazelwood, in Derbyshire, England.

== History ==
The Midland Railway opened Hazelwood and other stations on the branch line to Wirksworth on 1 October 1867. The station was designed by the company architect John Holloway Sanders.

The London, Midland and Scottish Railway temporarily withdrew Wirksworth branch passenger services from 16 June 1947, due to post-war fuel shortages. British Railways made this closure permanent from May 1949 when the line was removed from the summer timetable. The branch remained in use for mineral freight until December 1989.

The station building and yard were sold and are now the premises of a timber yard and sawmill. The platform has been removed.

The line through the station is now operated as the heritage Ecclesbourne Valley Railway but there are no plans to reopen the station.

=== Stationmasters ===
- Anthony Swift 1867 - 1890
- H. Swift 1890 - 1929
- G.W. Marple 1929 - 1931 (also station master at Shottle)

In 1931, Hazelwood station was placed under the direct supervision of the Duffield station master.

== Spelling ==
The station was originally spelt Hazlewood in the 1867 Midland Railway timetable. The village itself was spelt Hazzlewood on an Ordnance Survey (OS) map of the time. It was subsequently spelt Hazelwood on timetables and station name boards. The OS changed to the current spelling around 1920.

== Location ==
The station is sited on Nether Lane, north of the B5023 road to Wirksworth, which is the main route from Duffield to Wirksworth; it parallels the railway along the Ecclesbourne Valley.

== Route ==
Preceding station	Historical railways	Following station
Shottle	Midland Railway; Wirksworth Branch	Duffield
