= Listed buildings in Idridgehay and Alton =

Idridgehay and Alton is a civil parish in the Amber Valley district of Derbyshire, England. The parish contains 27 listed buildings that are recorded in the National Heritage List for England. Of these, one is listed at Grade II*, the middle of the three grades, and the others are at Grade II, the lowest grade. The parish contains the villages of Idridgehay and Alton and the surrounding countryside. Most of the listed buildings are houses, cottages and associated structures, farmhouses and farm buildings. The other listed buildings include former watermills, a public house, a church, a railway station, and the former stationmaster's house.

== Key ==
Grade	Criteria
II*	Particularly important buildings of more than special interest
II	Buildings of national importance and special interest

== Buildings ==
Name and location	Photograph	Date	Notes	Grade
Alton Hall; 53.04853°N 1.58687°W	—	Late 16th century	A house that was later extended, it is in gritstone and brick, with quoins, and a tile roof with coped gables and kneelers, some moulded. There are two storeys and an L-shaped plan. In the north wing are mullioned windows and casements, and in both wings are doorways with chamfered quoined surrounds and four-centred arched heads. The south wing has a two-storey canted bay window with sashes, rusticated lintels, and a moulded eaves cornice.	II
South Sitch; 53.03496°N 1.57182°W	—	1621 or earlier	The house was extended in 1842. The original part is timber framed with close studding on a stone plinth, and with a thatched roof. There are two storeys and an attic, a front of two bays, and a single-storey extension to the northeast. On the front is a gabled porch with a thatched roof, and a doorway with a four-centred arched head. Some of the windows are casements, and some are mullioned. The extension is roughcast, and has a stone slate roof, and a porch with a four-centred arched lintel. Inside, there is much exposed timber framing.	II*
Cliffash Farmhouse and outbuilding 53.03516°N 1.58177°W	—	17th century	The farmhouse and outbuilding are in gritstone, with coped gables and moulded kneelers to the southwest. There are two storeys and an L-shaped plan, with two ranges at right angles. The house has four bays, and contains mullioned windows, and two doorways, one with a massive quoined surround and a Tudor arched soffit to a deep lintel. The outbuilding at right angles has four bays, and contains irregular openings with doorways, square windows, an overloft door approached by external steps, and slit vents.	II
Mag Lane Farmhouse; 53.02904°N 1.58569°W	—	17th century	The farmhouse, which was later extended, is in gritstone on a chamfered plinth, with coped gables and moulded kneelers. There are three bays, the right two bays with two storeys and attics, and the left bay lower with two storeys. The doorway has a rectangular fanlight, to its right is a tripartite sash window, the upper floor contains three-light mullioned windows, and in the attic are gabled dormers. The left bay has a sash window in the ground floor and a narrow casement window above.	II
White House; 53.02611°N 1.57312°W	—	17th century	The house was remodelled and extended in the 18th century. The original part is in gritstone, the extension is in brick, and the roof is tiled. There are two storeys, and a T-shaped plan, with a front range of three bays, and a lower rear wing. The central doorway has a quoined surround, and the windows in the front range are mullioned. In the rear wing is a doorway with a quoined surround, and the windows are casements.	II
Alton Mill; 53.04667°N 1.57320°W	—	1695	A water-powered corn mill, later an outbuilding, it is in gritstone, and has a tile roof with coped gables. On the front are irregular openings, including a central doorway with a stepped chamfered lintel, and a loft doorway. In the south gable end are two-light mullioned windows, and on the front are two inscribed and dated stones.	II
Wallstone Farmhouse; 53.03888°N 1.56821°W	—	Early 18th century	The farmhouse, which was later extended, is in gritstone, the extension is in brick, with quoins, and a tile roof with moulded gables and kneelers. There are two storeys and attics, a front range of five bays, and a rear wing. The central doorway has a moulded surround, and is flanked by pairs of sash windows, each pair under a massive lintel. The windows in the upper floor and rear wing are mullioned, and in the north wall is a doorway with a quoined surround and an initialled and dated lintel.	II
Bridge House; 53.02823°N 1.56357°W	—	Late 18th century	The house is in gritstone with quoins, and a slate roof with coped gables and moulded kneelers. There are two storeys and two bays. The doorway has a quoined surround, a deep lintel, and a hood mould, and the windows are mullioned with two lights and casements.	II
Bridge over Sherbourne Brook; 53.02622°N 1.56480°W	—	Late 18th century	The bridge carries Hillcliff Lane over the Sherbourne Brook. It is in gritstone, and consists of two semicircular arches. There are cutwaters on both sides, and above the arches is a string course and a parapet.	II
Home Farmhouse; 53.02768°N 1.58493°W		Late 18th century	The farmhouse is in red brick with dentilled eaves, and a tile roof with coped gables. There are two storeys and attics, and an L-shaped plan, with a main range of three bays, and a two-storey rear wing. In the centre is a doorway under a segmental arch, the windows have segmental-arched heads and small central opening lights, and the window above the doorway is blocked.	II
Black Swan Inn and outbuilding 53.03654°N 1.57315°W		Early 19th century	The public house is in red brick on the front, roughcast on the sides and rear, and has a Welsh slate roof with overhanging eaves. There are two storeys and three bays. In the centre is a gabled open porch flanked by two-storey canted bay windows. The windows have four-centred arched heads and Gothic glazing. The outbuilding, recessed on the right, is in gritstone and has a tile roof. There is a single storey and attics, the openings have segmental heads, and there are three gabled dormers.	II
Holme Farmhouse; 53.03720°N 1.57359°W	—	Early 19th century	The farmhouse is in gritstone with a Welsh slate roof. There are two storeys and attics, and three bays. The central doorway has a quoined moulded surround and a rectangular fanlight, and the windows are sashes.	II
Rakestone Farmhouse; 53.03627°N 1.59092°W		Early 19th century	The farmhouse is in red brick with a dentilled eaves cornice and a tile roof. There are two storeys and three bays. The central doorway and the windows have four-centred arched heads and Gothic tracery.	II
Sherbourne Mill House; 53.02648°N 1.56582°W	—	Early 19th century	The house is in gritstone on the front, rendered on the sides and rear, and it has a Welsh slate roof with coped gables. There are two storeys and three bays, a central doorway, and sash windows.	II
The Cottage; 53.02803°N 1.58553°W	—	Early 19th century	The cottage is in gritstone, with a tile roof, two storeys and three bays. The central doorway has a deep lintel, above it is a narrow casement window, and in the other bays are windows with cast iron frames, deep lintels, and central opening lights.	II
Ecclesbourne House; 53.02932°N 1.56357°W	—	c.1845	The house is in gritstone and has a Welsh slate roof with bracketed gables. There are two storeys and three bays, with gables at the east and west ends, the latter projecting. In the centre is a gabled porch, and a doorway with a chamfered surround, a four-centred arched head, and a hood mould. The windows are casements with four-centred arched heads and hood moulds.	II
Alton Manor and stables 53.05560°N 1.57986°W	—	1846–47	A small country house designed by George Gilbert Scott in Elizabethan style. It is built in gritstone on a plinth, and has a tile roof with coped gables and moulded kneelers. There are two storeys and attics and an irregular L-shaped plan. The porch in the angle has a doorway with a moulded surround, a four-centred arched head, and decorated spandrels. Above it is a hood mould, a coat of arms, a pointed oriel window, and an octagonal tower with a pierced parapet. The windows are mullioned and transomed. On the garden front is a canted two-storey bay window with an embattled parapet and grotesque spouts. Adjoining the house is a two-storey stable range with a gabled entrance bay containing a moulded four-centred archway, and on the corner is an ogee cupola.	II
Lodge to Alton Manor, gates and gate piers 53.05395°N 1.57683°W	—	1846–47	The lodge, designed by George Gilbert Scott in Elizabethan style, is in gritstone, and has quoins, and a stone slate roof with coped gables and moulded kneelers. There are two storeys and a cruciform plan. The east front is gabled, and contains a canted bay window, and there is a gabled porch in the angle. The windows are casements, some with mullions. Flanking the entrance to the drive are square gate piers with ball finials, and the ornate gates are in wrought iron.	II
Ice house, Alton Manor; 53.05651°N 1.58054°W	—	c. 1846	The ice house is a circular stone structure with a brick lining. There are three doorways that are entered through a straight passage.	II
Iretonwood House; 53.02690°N 1.58359°W	—	c. 1850	A red brick house with rusticated stone quoins. There are two storeys and three asymmetrical bays with stepped gables and finials, and a rear service wing. The central bay contains a doorway with a four-centred arched head, flanked by tall windows with hood moulds, and above it is a small oriel window. The right bay contains a large canted bay window with a pierced parapet, and an oriel window above. In the left corner is an octagonal turret with a slate spire and a weathervane.	II
Gateway, Iretonwood House; 53.02738°N 1.58450°W		c. 1850	The gate piers flanking the entrance to the drive are in gritstone, and have a square plan, moulded caps, and ball finials. Between them are ornate wrought iron gates and a round-arched overthrow.	II
House northeast of Iretonwood House, wall and railings 53.02699°N 1.58313°W	—	Mid 19th century	The house is in red brick with a tile roof, two storeys and four bays. On the front is a doorway with a rectangular fanlight, and a gabled porch with decorative bargeboards and a finial. The windows are sashes with wedge lintels. Enclosing the garden to the front is a low brick coped wall with iron railings.	II
Wood Cottage; 53.02796°N 1.58553°W	—	Mid 19th century	The cottage is in red brick with a tile roof, two storeys and three bays. The windows are two-light casements with shallow arched heads and lattice glazing.	II
St James' Church; 53.03776°N 1.57571°W		1854–55	The church is in gritstone with slate roofs, and is in Decorated style. It consists of a nave, a north aisle, a north porch, a chancel, and a northeast steeple. The steeple has a tower with three stages, bands between the stages, pierced quatrefoils in the middle stage, bell openings with pointed arched in the top stage, and a broach spire with lucarnes. The gabled porch is in timber and has decorative bargeboards.	II
Idridgehay railway station 53.03555°N 1.56928°W		c. 1867	The station was built by the Midland Railway, it was closed for some years, and later opened on the Ecclesbourne Valley Railway. It is in gritstone on a plinth, with quoins, and oversailing Welsh slate roofs with decorative bargeboards on the south gables. There is a single storey and an H-shaped plan. In the central bay is a doorway with a moulded surround, and the windows are mullioned.	II
Station Master's House; 53.03592°N 1.56946°W		c. 1867	The house was built by the Midland Railway for the station master of Idridgehay railway station. It is in gritstone with an oversailing Welsh slate roof. There are two storeys and a T-shaped plan. The doorway is in an angle, the ground floor windows in the main part have semicircular heads, and those in the upper floor have flat chamfered lintels. The west gable projects, and contains sash windows.	II
Sherbourne Mill; 53.02650°N 1.56607°W	—	Undated	A former water-powered cornmill, it is in gritstone and red brick, and has a tile roof. There are two storeys and an overloft, a former wheelpit, plain doorways and windows, and a large curved buttress on the north side. The mill race is overgrown and blocked.	II
