= River Ecclesbourne =

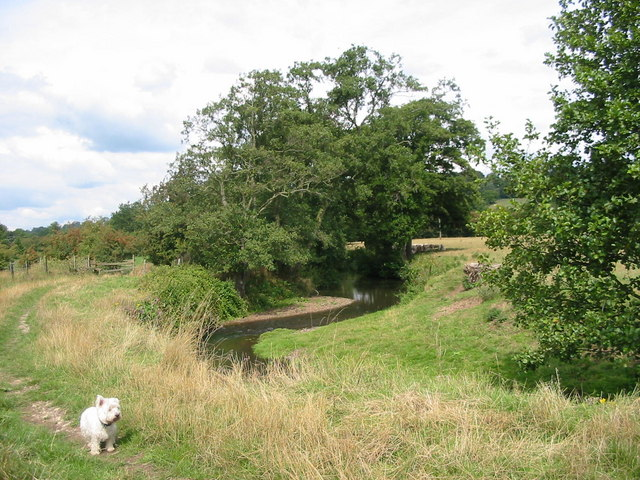

- Confluence with Derwent in Derbyshire

Location
- Country: England
- Counties: Derbyshire

Physical characteristics
- Source
  - location: Wirksworth, Derbyshire
- Mouth: Confluence with the Derwent
  - location: Duffield, Derbyshire
  - coordinates: 52°59′5″N 1°28′48″W
- Length: 15 km (9.3 mi)
- Basin size: 60 km^{2} (23 sq mi)
- Discharge
  - location: Duffield
  - average: 0.63 m^{3}/s (22 cu ft/s)

Basin features
- Tributaries
  - left: Franker Brook
  - right: Alton Brook, Holm Brook, Sherbourne Brook

The River Ecclesbourne is a small river in Derbyshire, England, which starts in the upper part of the town of Wirksworth, flows for 9 miles to Duffield, and then enters the River Derwent just outside the village.

== Course ==
The River Ecclesbourne's source is in the town of Wirksworth. This is also where the Ecclesbourne Valley Railway, which is named after the river and follows it for its entire length, begins. The start of the river is located between Steeple Grange and Sough Lane. The river's two main headwaters come from Steeple Grange, below Bolehill, and the fields below the National Stone Centre, Ravenstor. The main source is about 100 metres down the railway tracks from Ravenstor railway station, where the Meerbrook Sough Mine area lies. The Meerbrook Sough drained water from the nearby quarries and led them in a tunnel to Whatstandwell where the excess water from the Sough joined the River Derwent towards Ambergate. The source of the Ecclesbourne contributed to the water powering the Meerbrook Sough. The Ecclesbourne flows mostly underground through the area of the Sough, but momentarily appears above ground in several places, near Ecclesbourne Cottages at the bottom of Sough Lane, in a shallow ditch next to the railway (now piped) and also near the bottom of Fanny Shaws Park, again near the main railway track. Part of the main headwaters of the Ecclesbourne flowed past the rectangular Sough Reservoir, which transported water up to the quarries around Wirksworth. This reservoir was located at the bottom left area of Fanny Shaws Park. The Meerbrook Sough Engine House was built in the middle of the Sough area and powered the waterworks of the Sough and made materials for the quarries. Below Fanny Shaws Park and skatepark the Ecclesbourne leaves the Sough area and goes underground and reappears in the Hannages further down the railway tracks, where it powered the mills at the bottom of Wirksworth. The housing estate of Spring Close has recently been built over the area of the Meerbrook Sough; the Engine House still remains in its original place, but has recently been renovated into a house.

After leaving Wirksworth the River Ecclesbourne is now a fairly large river. It flows slowly through the fields, collecting smaller streams as it goes (among them the Alton Brook and Holm Brook), to its next port of call, the village of Idridgehay. Further down, the Ecclesbourne flows through Turnditch. After leaving Turnditch the Ecclesbourne increases in volume and speed. In some areas the river is piped underground to reduce the risk of flooding, but this rarely happens any more.

A few miles beyond Turnditch the river enters the village of Duffield. The Ecclesbourne School, the village's secondary school, is built on its banks in the village centre. The Ecclesbourne then flows out of Duffield and leaves the railway after flowing underneath its tracks. It reappears and flows through a few more fields before joining the River Derwent, which has just come down from Milford and Belper. At the confluence where the Ecclesbourne ends it is about 10 metres wide. The area around the confluence is popular with visitors and a good area for angling. After the river has met the Derwent, the railway line joins the main line to Derby.

== Wildlife and conservation ==
The River Ecclesbourne is a popular fishing river, known for producing good-quality fish, especially in its lower reaches. It supports a population of brown trout.

Species of conservation interest found along the Ecclesbourne include white-clawed crayfish, kingfisher, otter and water vole. Threats include pollution, weirs that restrict fish migration, and invasive Himalayan balsam. The river is one of 25 river catchments chosen by Defra for a Pilot Catchment Project, with the aim of encouraging co-operation between various agencies and interested parties to improve water quality, as part of the UK's commitment to the EU Water Framework Directive.

In 2023, work began to encourage Atlantic salmon back to the river. A channel was created to bypass the last remaining weir (dating from 1792) on the river. Thirteen salmon were recorded in the river that year. In 2025, 52 salmon were sighted as far upstream as the site of the former Postern Mill in Turnditch. Work to improve access to the upper reaches of the river for migratory fish species was carried out by Derbyshire Wildlife Trust, the Wild Trout Trust, Chatsworth, Nestlé Waters & Premium Beverages UK.
