= Idridgehay and Alton =

Civil parish in Derbyshire, England

Coordinates: 53°02′N 01°34′W

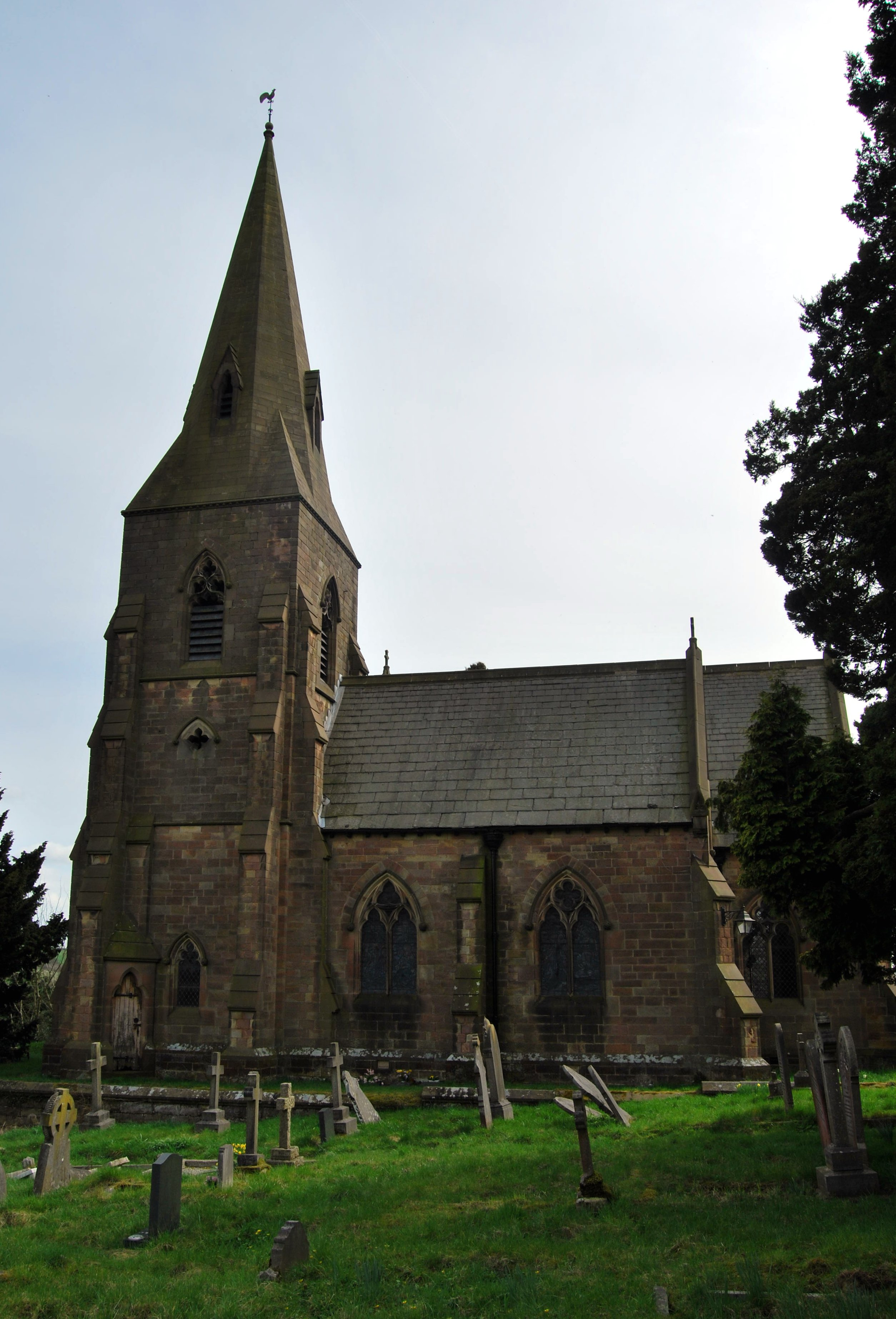
- St James's Church, Idridgehay

- Location within Derbyshire
- Population: 275 (2011 census)
- Civil parish: Idridgehay and Alton
- District: Amber Valley
- Shire county: Derbyshire
- Region: East Midlands
- Country: England
- Sovereign state: United Kingdom

Idridgehay and Alton is a civil parish in the Amber Valley district of Derbyshire, England. The population of the civil parish taken at the 2011 Census was 275. Its principal settlements are the village of Idridgehay and the hamlets of Alton, Idridgehay Green and Ireton Wood.

Pronounced
(listen)

The Ecclesbourne Valley Railway line runs parallel to the parish.

== See also ==
- Listed buildings in Idridgehay and Alton
