= Listed buildings in Hazelwood, Derbyshire =

Hazelwood is a civil parish in the Amber Valley district of Derbyshire, England. The parish contains nine listed buildings that are recorded in the National Heritage List for England. All the listed buildings are designated at Grade II, the lowest of the three grades, which is applied to "buildings of national importance and special interest". The parish contains the village of Hazelwood and the surrounding countryside. The listed buildings consist of houses, farmhouses and farm buildings, a church and a former chapel.

== Buildings ==
Name and location	Photograph	Date	Notes
Hazelwood Hall Farmhouse; 53.00655°N 1.50304°W		17th century or earlier	The farmhouse is in gritstone with a moulded plinth band, a moulded eaves cornice, and a tile roof with coped gables and kneelers. There are two storeys and an H-shaped plan, with a central range of two bays, and projecting gabled cross-wings. The doorway has a quoined surround and a bracketed canopy. The windows in the ground floor are mullioned, and in the upper floor they are sashes.
Larch Tree Cottage; 53.00712°N 1.50922°W	—	17th century	The house is in gritstone with some later brickwork, quoins, and a Welsh slate roof. There are two storeys, a basement and an attic, and two bays. The south bay contains mullioned windows, the window in the ground floor with a hood mould. In front of the south bay is a later single-storey extension, and in the upper floor is a casement window.
Iretons Farmhouse; 53.01216°N 1.50328°W	—	Mid 18th century	The farmhouse, which incorporates 17th-century material, is in gritstone, and has a Welsh slate roof with coped gables and moulded kneelers. There are two storeys, an L-shaped plan, and a front of three bays. The central doorway has a quoined surround, and most of the windows are mullioned.
Larch Tree Farmhouse and outbuildings 53.00872°N 1.51019°W		Mid to late 18th century	The farmhouse is in gritstone, and has a blue tile roof with coped gables. There are two storeys, three bays, and a lean-to on the west. The doorway has a flat arch with voussoirs, and the windows vary. At the west end is an outbuilding, and extending from it is a boundary wall about 2 metres (6 ft 7 in) high. This extends in front of the house, including an entrance, and to the west is a doorway to a service yard.
Outbuilding, Iretons Farm; 53.01243°N 1.50314°W	—	Late 18th century	The outbuilding is in gritstone, and has a tile roof with coped gables and moulded kneelers. There are two storeys and three bays. In the ground floor is an open arcade, the openings with semicircular heads, voussoirs, and projecting keystones, and the upper floor contains two openings.
Outbuildings, The Firs Farm; 53.00648°N 1.52080°W		Late 18th century	The outbuildings are in gritstone with tile roofs and two storeys. There are two ranges at right angles, the north range with seven bays, and the east range with three. The north range contains five doorways with massive lintels, in the upper floor are seven openings, and on the roof are two triangular vents. The east range has a central full-height depressed segmental arch flanked by doorways, one with a fanlight.
Former Methodist Chapel; 53.02673°N 1.51247°W		1816	The former chapel is in gritstone with moulded eaves, and a tile roof with coped gables. It consists of two parallel ranges. In the gable ends are doorways with quoined surrounds, and above one door is an oval raised plaque with the date. On the sides are semicircular-headed windows with voussoirs and Gothic glazing.
St John's Church; 53.01073°N 1.51224°W		1844–46	The church, which was restored in 1902 after a fire, is in gritstone with a Westmorland slate roof. It consists of a nave with a south porch, a chancel with a north vestry, and on the west gable is a gabled bellcote. The porch is gabled with angle buttresses, and it contains a doorway with a pointed arch, over which is a hood mould and a triangular recess containing a clock face, a bell, and a finial on the apex. The windows are lancets.
The Firs Farmhouse; 53.00636°N 1.52112°W	—	Mid 18th century	The farmhouse is in roughcast brick with a Welsh slate roof. There are two storeys and five bays, the left bay recessed and lower, and with a porch in the angle. The fourth bay is flanked by pilasters with moulded capitals, and it contains a doorway with a moulded lintel. Flanking it are canted bay windows, and elsewhere are tripartite casement windows with moulded lintels.
