= Hazelwood, Derbyshire =

Village in Derbyshire, England

Coordinates: 53.011°N 1.512°W

Hazelwood
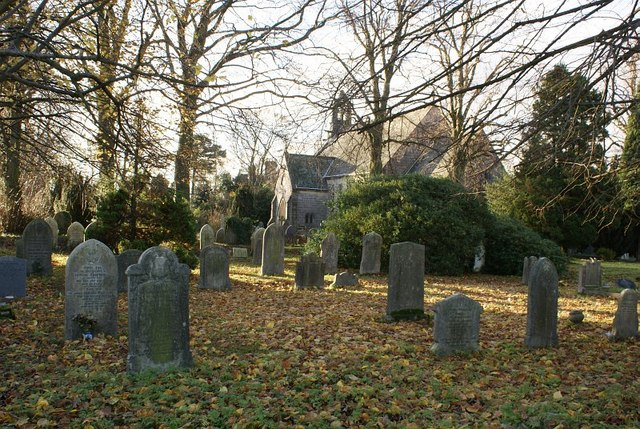
- St John the Evangelist church and graveyard, Hazelwood

- Location within Derbyshire
- Population: 330 (2011)
- OS grid reference: SK328460
- District: Amber Valley
- Shire county: Derbyshire
- Region: East Midlands
- Country: England
- Sovereign state: United Kingdom
- Post town: BELPER
- Postcode district: DE56
- Police: Derbyshire
- Fire: Derbyshire
- Ambulance: East Midlands

Hazelwood (until recently spelt Hazlewood) is a village in Derbyshire at the lower end of the Pennines around five miles north of Derby, England. Ordnance Survey maps in the nineteenth century spelt it Hazzlewood. The population of the civil parish as of the 2011 census was 330.

It is located on the western edge of Chevin Hill. Nearby is a place called Firestone where beacon fires were lit to rouse the country when peril of invasion or other dangers were imminent. Firestone is now the site of a reservoir owned by the Severn Trent water board.

Formerly it was part of the parish and manor of nearby Duffield. In 1817 it was recorded that "Hazlewood is parcel of the manor of Duffield. The Blount family had for many years an estate there, called a manor in records of the reign of Edward III and that of Edward IV."

In the days before Hazelwood had its own cemetery, burials were conducted at St. Alkmunds in Duffield. It is said that funeral parties would stop for refreshment at the New Inn on Hazlewood Road (now a private house) and would leave the coffin resting on the flat stone coping of the garden wall.

Hazelwood railway station was about half a mile from St. John's Church down Hob Hill, on the Wirksworth Branch of the Midland Railway.

Edith Maude Hull, born in Hampstead, married locally born Percy Winstanley Hull and moved to "The Knowle" where she wrote a number of books, including The Sheik, which led to the film of the same name starring Rudolf Valentino.

== See also ==
- Listed buildings in Hazelwood, Derbyshire
