= St John the Evangelist's Church, Hazelwood =

St John the Evangelist’s Church, Hazelwood
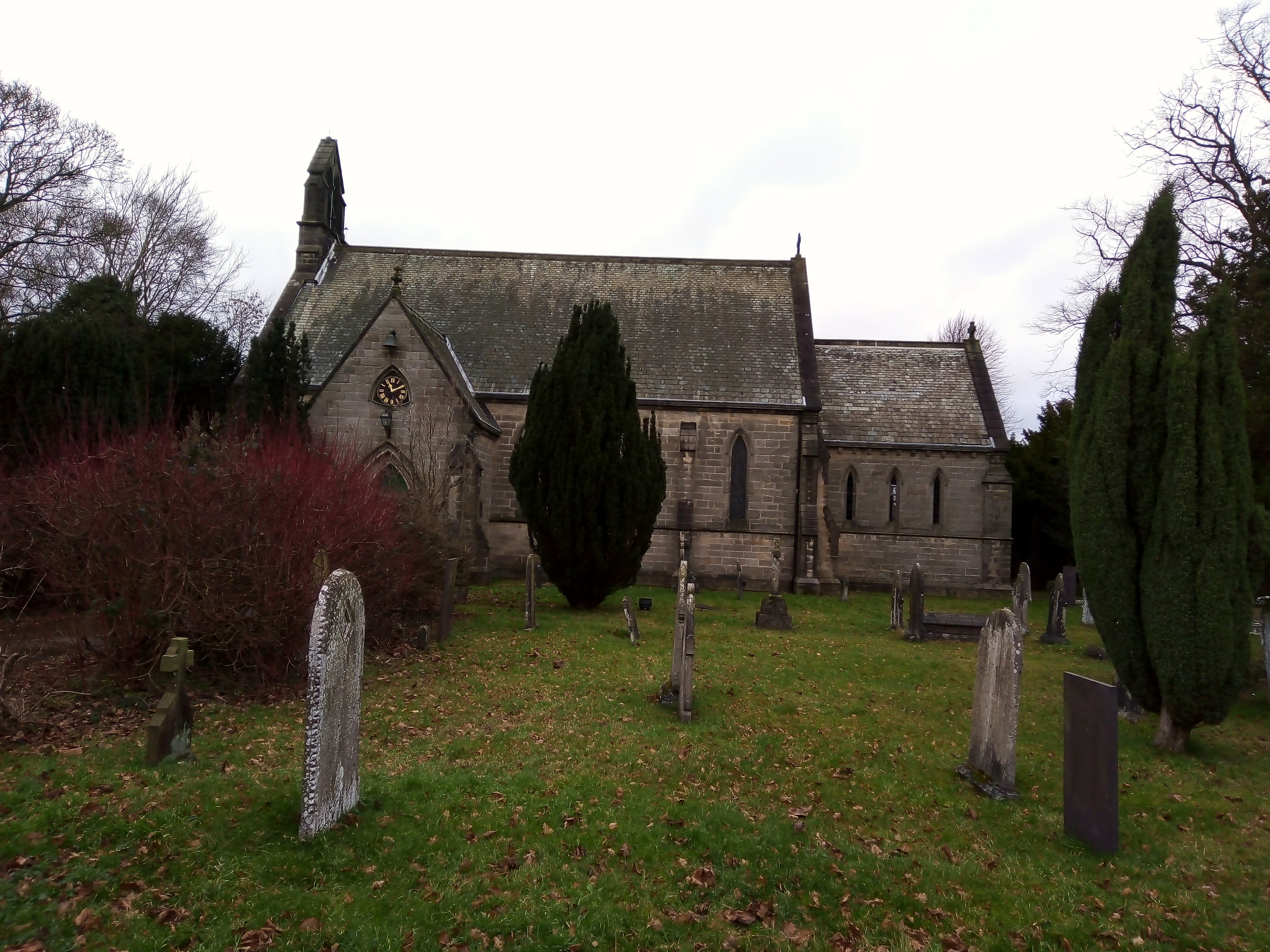
- St John the Evangelist’s Church in 2022

- Location within Derbyshire
- 53°00′37.12″N 1°30′45.36″W
- OS grid reference: SK 32821 46043
- Location: Hazelwood, Derbyshire
- Country: England
- Denomination: Church of England

History
- Dedication: St John the Evangelist
- Consecrated: 19 May 1846

Architecture
- Heritage designation: Grade II listed
- Architect: Henry Isaac Stevens

Administration
- Province: Canterbury
- Diocese: Derby
- Archdeaconry: Derby
- Deanery: Duffield
- Parish: Hazelwood

St John the Evangelist's Church, Hazelwood is a Grade II listed parish church in the Church of England in Hazelwood, Derbyshire.

== History ==
The architect was Henry Isaac Stevens who drew up plans in 1844. It was funded through the efforts of Col. Colville of Duffield Hall. The church was consecrated on Ascension Day 1864 by the Bishop of Lichfield.

The church was badly damaged by a fire on 1 February 1902. It was re-opened on 2 December 1902 after a restoration costing £2,000 by Naylor and Sale of Derby.

== Parish status ==
The church is in a joint parish with

- Holy Trinity Church, Milford
- St Lawrence's Church, Shottle
- St Michael's Church, Holbrook

== Organ ==
After the fire in 1902 a new organ was supplied by Charles Lloyd of Nottingham.

== See also ==
- Listed buildings in Hazelwood, Derbyshire
