= British Rail Derby Lightweight =

Class of diesel multiple units

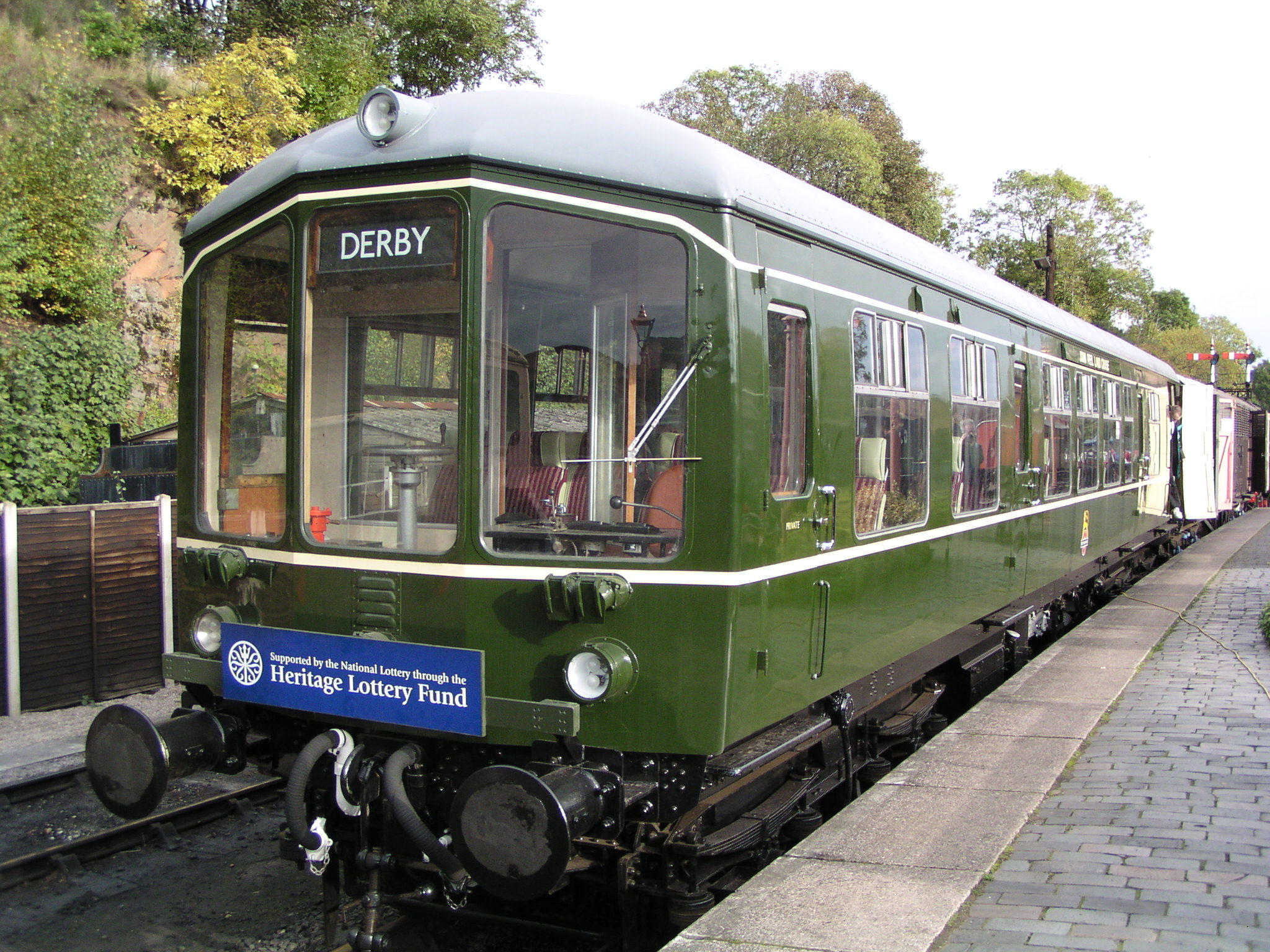
- Derby Lightweight power car no. 79018 at Bewdley on the Severn Valley Railway

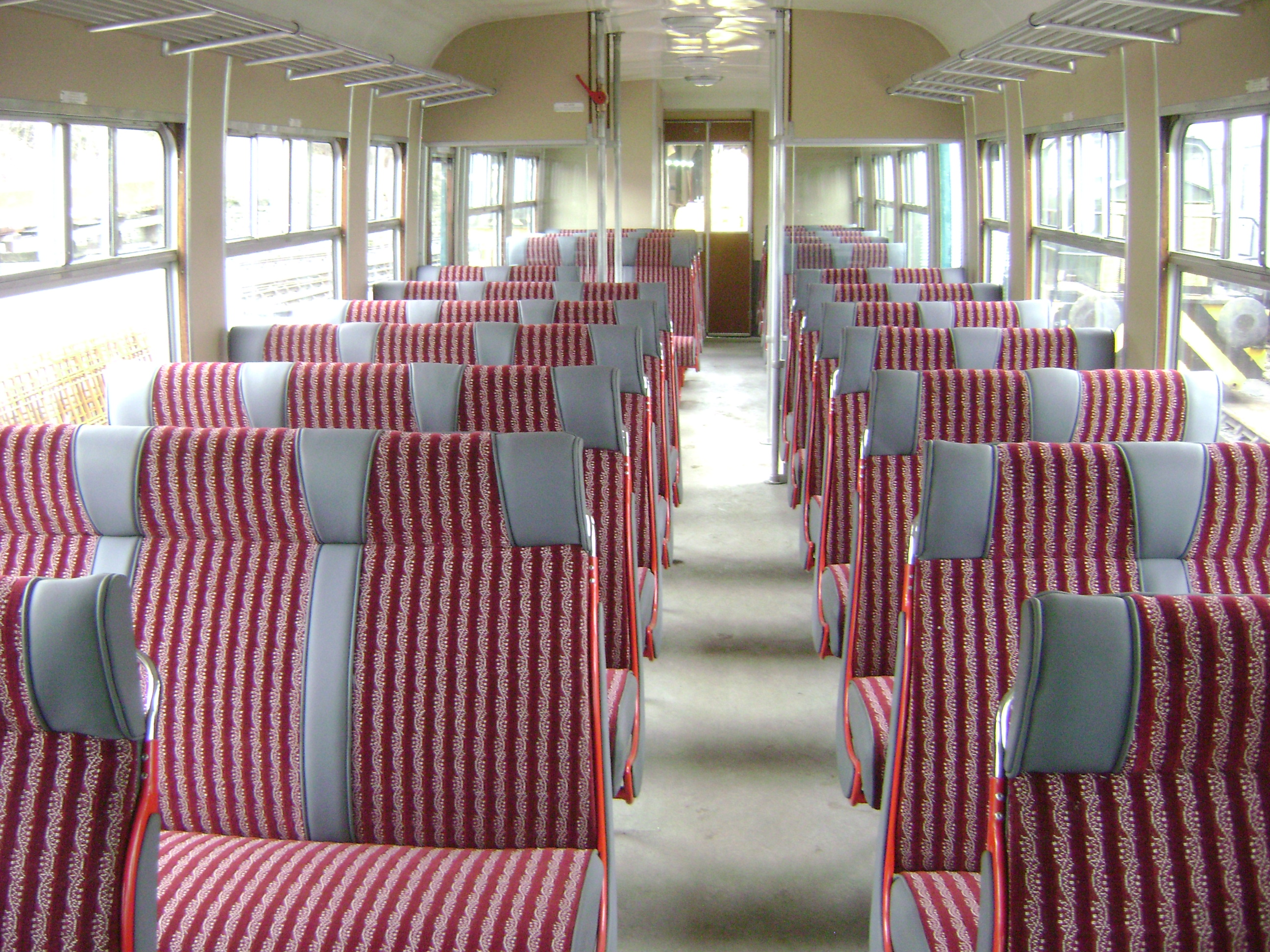
- The refurbished seating in the 2nd class saloons of the Trailer Car 79612 - 2021
- In service: 1954-1969
- Manufacturer: BR Derby Works
- Replaced: Steam locomotives and carriages
- Constructed: 1954-1959
- Number built: 217 vehicles
- Number preserved: 2 sets
- Formation: 1, 2 & 4 car formations
- Capacity: 16 1st + 53 3rd class (motor composite), 61 3rd class (motor third brake)
- Operator: British Rail

Specifications
- Car length: 57 ft 6 in (17.53 m)
- Doors: 2 on each side
- Maximum speed: 62 mph (100 km/h)
- Weight: 27 tonnes (26.6 long tons; 29.8 short tons) power car
- Prime mover: Two BUT
- Power output: (AEC) 125 bhp (93 kW) (79000-79007, 79500-79507); BUT (AEC) 150 bhp (110 kW) (remainder)
- Transmission: Hydraulic (79000-79007, 79500-79507); Mechanical 4-speed epicyclic gearbox (remainder)
- Multiple working: ▲ Red Triangle (79000-79007, 79500-79507) ◆ Yellow Diamond (remainder)
- Track gauge: 1,435 mm (4 ft 8 1/2 in) standard gauge

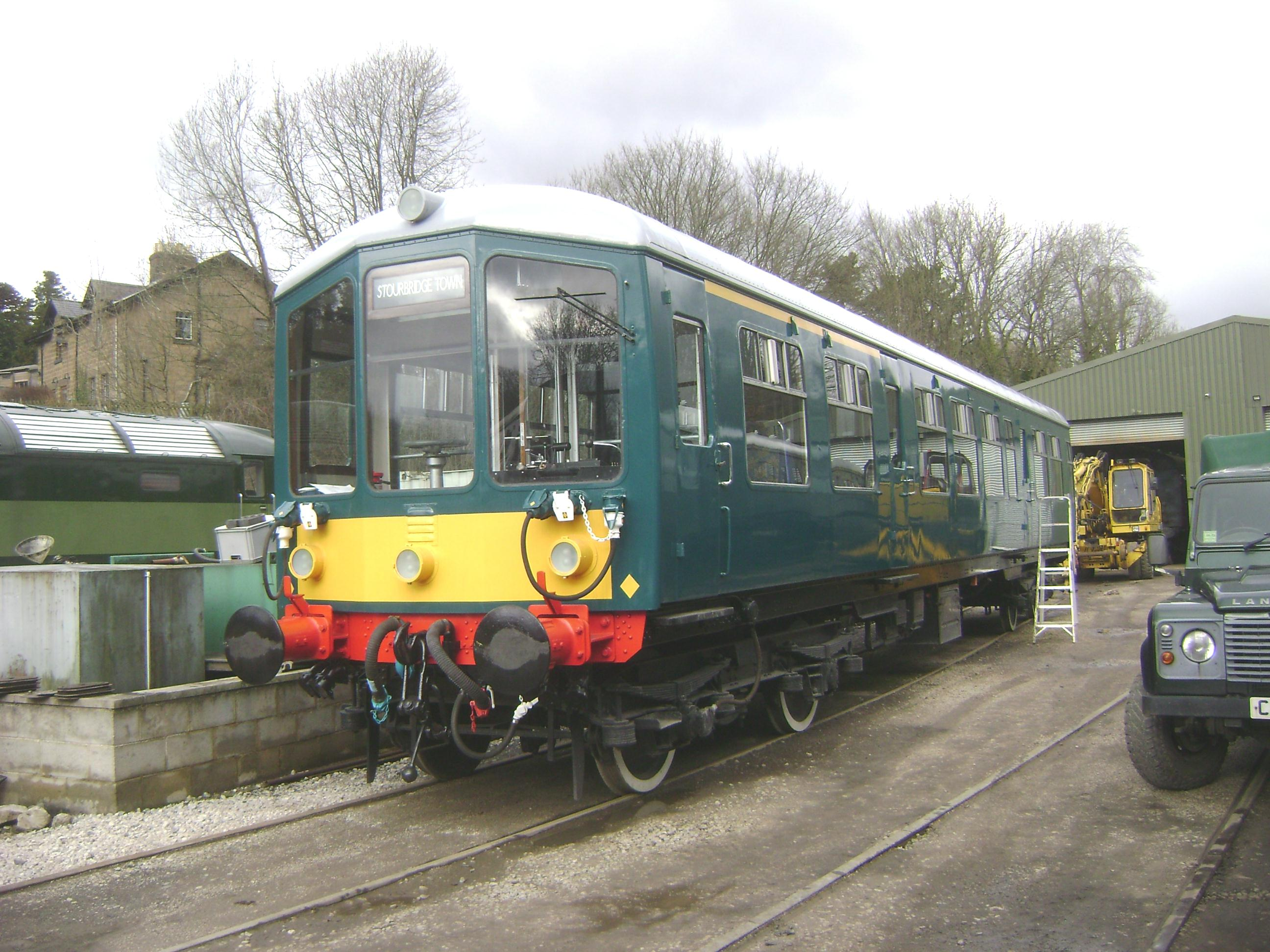
Derby Lightweight trailer no. 975008 (79612) outside EVR maintenance shed, Wirksworth, 2021. This vehicle has been restored to original condition, and will be able to enter traffic after cab wiring has been completed and its power car, after standing idle for 19 years, has been refurbished to run with it. The twin unit is preserved at the Ecclesbourne Valley Railway - Wirksworth.

The British Rail Derby Lightweight diesel multiple units were the first such trains to be built en-masse for British Railways. The units were built at BR's Derby Works from 1954 to 1955. The units were built in various formations, including 12 power-twin 2-car units, 84 power-trailer 2-car units, four 4-car units, and two single car units.

Body framing was extruded and riveted together. Panelling was welded into continuous sheets and riveted to the frame. Luggage racks were light alloy. The floors had 2 layers of flameproof hardboard, covered with linoleum. To reduce noise and condensation, the inside structure and undersides were sprayed with asbestos. Lighting was by 60-watt, 24-volt lamps charged by belt driven dynamos. Heating was oil fired. Standard mild steel bogies ran on Timken roller bearings.

Contemporaneous with these units was the unique Battery Electric Multiple Unit.

== Operations ==
The first units were introduced on services around the West Riding of Yorkshire, namely Leeds to Bradford and Harrogate services from 14 June 1954. Subsequent units were introduced onto services in West Cumbria, Lincolnshire, Norfolk, Newcastle to Middlesbrough, Edinburgh to Glasgow and, later, Birmingham to Sutton Coldfield, Bletchley to Buckingham and Banbury, and East London lines services. They were also the last units to run on the Anglesey Central Railway which closed to public traffic in 1964.

These units were extremely successful, helping to reduce the operating costs of branchlines and also attracting many more passengers when new. They carried 800,000 more passengers on the London Midland Region between February and October 1956 than steam did in the same period of 1955. The largest increase was 434% (4,772 passengers) on the Buckingham-Banbury line (from 13 August), followed by Birmingham-Lichfield 178% (from 5 March), Bury-Bacup 152% (from 6 February), Llandudno-Blaenau Ffestiniog 39% (from 5 March) and Manchester-Buxton 38% (from 8 October).

Due to their success, British Railways ordered many more DMU vehicles from various builders over the next decade, thus helping to eliminate steam locomotives. However, as these units were non-standard compared to other later DMU vehicles, they were subject to early retirement. The units with hydraulic transmission were withdrawn in 1964, and the last of the remaining units were withdrawn from normal traffic in 1969.

Table of orders and numbers
Lot No.	Type	Diagram	Qty	Fleet numbers	Notes
30084	Driving Motor Brake Second (DMBS)	501	8	E79000–79007	ER Power Twin sets
30085	Driving Motor Composite with lavatory (DMCL)	507	8	E79500–79507	ER Power Twin sets
30123	Driving Motor Brake Second (DMBS)	503	13	M79008–79020	LMR Power-Trailer sets
30124	Driving Trailer Composite with lavatory (DTCL)	509	13	M79600–79612	LMR Power-Trailer sets
30126	Driving Motor Brake Second (DMBS)	504	13	M79021–79033	LMR Power-Trailer sets
30127	Driving Trailer Composite with lavatory (DTCL)	505	13	M79613–79625	LMR Power-Trailer sets
30177	Driving Motor Brake Second (DMBS)	504	13	M79034–79046	LMR Power-Trailer sets
30178	Driving Trailer Composite with lavatory (DTCL)	505	13	M79250–79262	LMR Power-Trailer sets
30192	Driving Motor Composite (DMC)	502	5	E79508–79512	ER 4-car sets
30193	Driving Motor Second (DMS)	508	5	E79150–79154	ER 4-car sets
30194	Trailer Brake Second with lavatory (TBSL)	517	5	E79325–79329	ER 4-car sets
30195	Trailer Second with lavatory (TSL)	518	5	E79400–79404	ER 4-car sets
30201	Driving Motor Brake Second (DMBS)	633	7	M79143–79149	LMR Power-Trailer sets
30202	Driving Trailer Composite with lavatory (DTCL)	642	7	M79663–79669	LMR Power-Trailer sets
30235	Driving Motor Brake Second (DMBS)	633	9	M79118–79126	LMR Power-Trailer sets
30236	Driving Trailer Composite with lavatory (DTCL)	509	9	M79639–79647	LMR Power-Trailer sets
30240	Driving Motor Brake Second (DMBS)	633	10	M79127–79136	LMR Power-Trailer sets
30241	Driving Trailer Composite with lavatory (DTCL)	509	10	M79648–79657	LMR Power-Trailer sets
30240	Driving Motor Brake Second (DMBS)	527	4	E79137–79140	ER Power-Trailer sets
30241	Driving Trailer Composite with lavatory (DTCL)	631	4	E79658–79661	ER Power-Trailer sets
30246	Driving Motor Brake Second (DMBS)	633	2	M79141–79142	LMR Power-Trailer sets
30247	Driving Trailer Composite with lavatory (DTCL)	642	1	M79662	LMR Power-Trailer sets
30321	Driving Motor Brake Second (DMBS)	633	13	M79169–79181	LMR Power-Trailer sets
30322	Driving Trailer Composite with lavatory (DTCL)	511	15	M79670–79684	LMR Power-Trailer sets
30324	Driving Motor Brake Second (DMBS)	633	5	M79184–79188	LMR Power Twin sets
30325	Driving Motor Composite with lavatory (DMCL)	509	5	M79189–79193	LMR Power Twin sets
30380	Driving Motor Brake Second (DMBS)	514	1	M79900	Single car unit; 61 seats
30387	Driving Motor Brake Second (DMBS)	515	1	M79901	Single car unit; 52 seats

== Formations ==
Four different sorts of formation were created from the 217 cars built of this type, as follows:

=== Power Twins ===
Qty	DMBS + DMCL		DMBS + DMCL
8	79000 + 79500	to	79007 + 79507
5	79184 + 79189	to	79188 + 79193

=== Power Trailers ===
Qty	DMBS + DTCL		DMBS + DTCL
26	79008 + 79600	to	79033 + 79625
13	79034 + 79250	to	79046 + 79262
24	79118 + 79639	to	79141 + 79662
1	79142 + 79684		
7	79143 + 79663	to	79149 + 79669
13	79169 + 79670	to	79181 + 79682

=== Four Car Units ===
DMS	TBSL	TSL	DMC
79150	79325	79400	79508
79151	79326	79401	79509
79152	79327	79402	79510
79153	79328	79403	79511
79154	79329	79404	79512

=== Single Car Units ===
DMBS
79900
79901

79683 was left over as a spare DTCL, and took the place of 79649 in 1957, when this was converted into a special saloon on diagram 565. It was later renumbered 999510 in the departmental saloon series and was eventually scrapped in 1981.

In 1962 three of the power twin units were converted to power trailer units, when 79191–79193 were rebuilt as DTCL vehicles and renumbered 79633–79635.

== Powertrain ==
=== Power Twins 79000+79500 to 79007+79507 ===
- Engine: Two BUT (Leyland) 125 bhp
- Transmission: Hydraulic, Lysholm-Smith (Leyland) torque converter
- Coupling code: Red triangle

=== Remainder of the fleet ===
- Engine: Two BUT (AEC) 150 bhp
- Transmission: Mechanical
- Coupling code: Yellow diamond

== Departmental Use ==
A number of cars from these units were subsequently transferred to departmental (non-revenue earning) use after withdrawal from normal service:

- 79018 + 79612 were rebuilt as an ultrasonic test train based at Reading, numbered 975007 + 975008. Replaced by unit 901001.
- 79900 was rebuilt as test coach "Iris", based at Bletchley, numbered 975010. Later transferred to the BR Research Division at the Railway Technical Centre at Derby, for its last few years in traffic, it was repainted into original BR Green livery. Replaced by unit 901002.
- 79185 was taken into departmental use for brake trials, numbered 975012. It was scrapped in 1970.
- 79250 and 79252 were taken into departmental use as staff messrooms, numbered 975013 and 975014. They were scrapped in 1978 and 1982 respectively.
- 79649, the inspection saloon mentioned above, took its place in the departmental series as 999510.

== Preservation ==
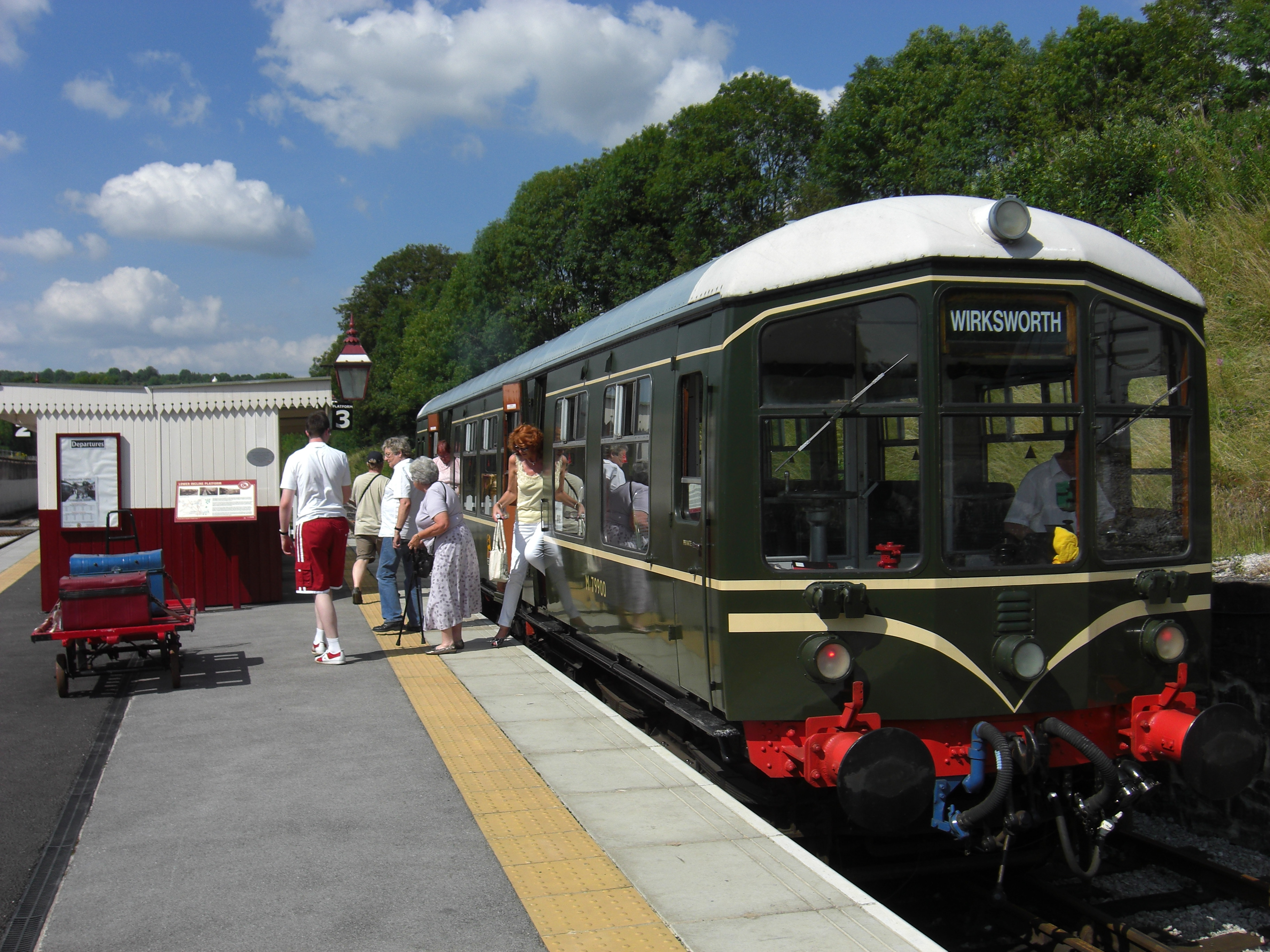
Derby Lightweight single car unit no. 79900 fully restored to passenger carrying standard again after being former test car Iris. The unit now resides on the Ecclesbourne Valley Railway running regular passenger diagrams.

Thanks to their extended life in departmental service, one 2-car unit and a single car unit survive in preservation on the Ecclesbourne Valley Railway, the former following a high-profile campaign.

Vehicle Nos.		Location	Comments	In Service	Departmental Nos.	
DMBS	DTC	Location	Comments	In Service	DMBS	DTC
79018	79612	Ecclesbourne Valley Railway	Used as ultrasonic test train.	Part Restored/Not In Service	975007	975008
79900	—	Ecclesbourne Valley Railway	Used as test coach "Iris".	Regularly in Passenger Service	975010	—

== See also ==
- British Rail BEMU – a power-trailer two car EMU based on the Derby Lightweight DMU design.
