= Idridgehay =

Village in Derbyshire, England

Coordinates: 53°02′10″N 01°34′25″W

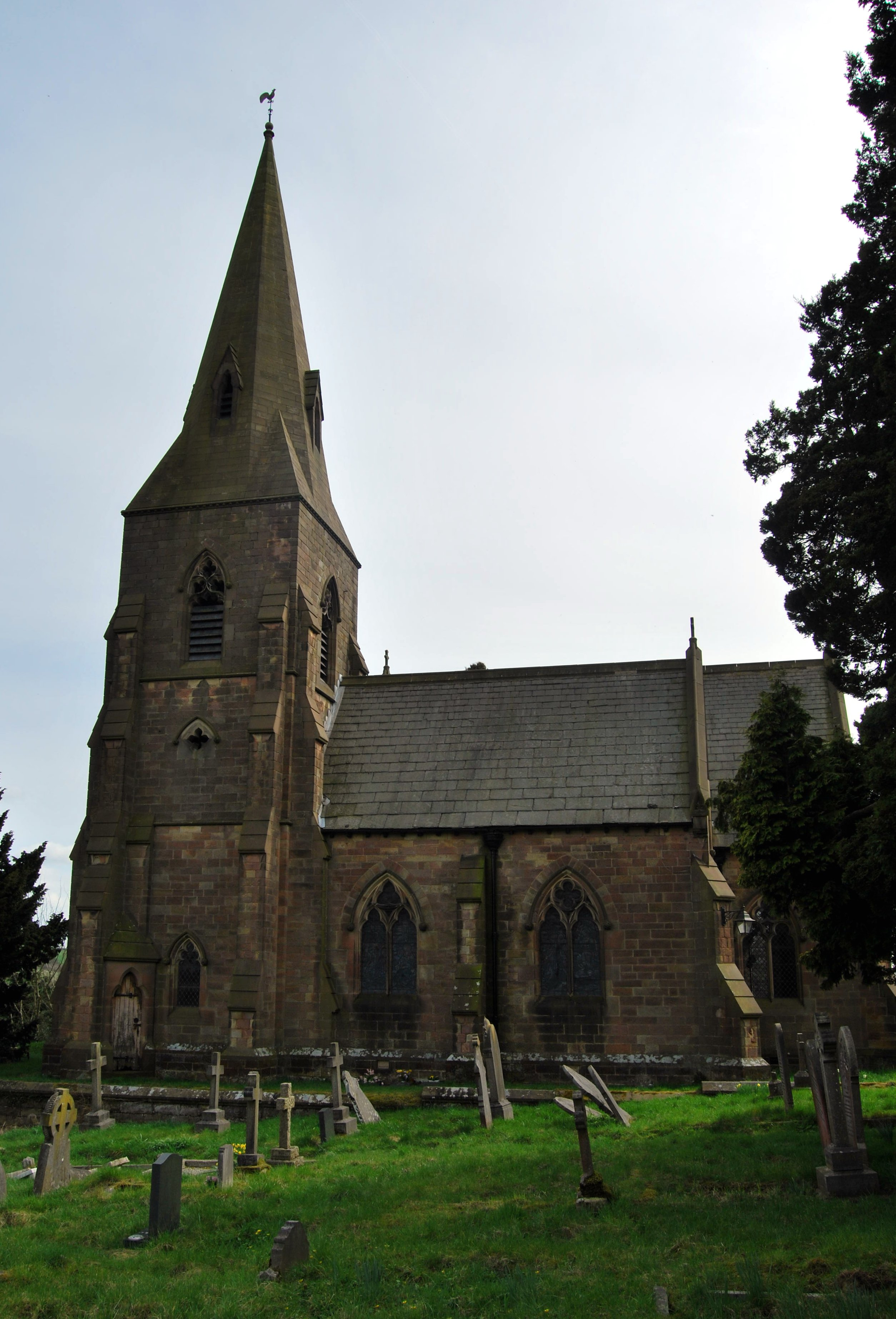
- St James's Church

- Location within Derbyshire
- Civil parish: Idridgehay and Alton
- District: Amber Valley
- Shire county: Derbyshire
- Region: East Midlands
- Country: England
- Sovereign state: United Kingdom

Idridgehay is a village in the civil parish of Idridgehay and Alton, in the Amber Valley district of Derbyshire, England.

Pronounced
(listen)

The population of this parish at the 2011 census was 275.

== Geography ==
Idridgehay lies south of the town Wirksworth west of the town of Belper in the valley of the River Ecclesbourne. Idridgehay Green is immediately to its west and the hamlet of Ireton Wood a mile to its south.

== Transport ==
The village lies on the B5023 road that connects Wirksworth and Duffield. However the main bus service, route 6.1 operated by Trentbarton, is between Matlock and Belper. Idridgehay railway station (re-opened in 2008) is on the Ecclesbourne Valley Railway, a community-owned and locally managed heritage railway venture having reopened and operate the railway between those towns.

== Buildings ==
The parish church, St James, was designed by Henry Isaac Stevens and consecrated in 1845.

== See also ==
- Listed buildings in Idridgehay and Alton
