= Duffield railway station =

Railway station in Derbyshire, England

Coordinates: 52.988°N 1.486°W

Duffield
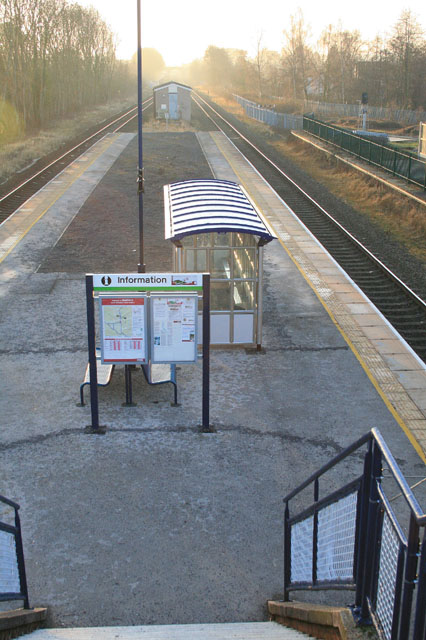
- The station, looking south in 2009

General information
- Location: Duffield, Borough of Amber Valley; England
- Grid reference: SK345435
- Manager: East Midlands Railway
- Platforms: 3 (2 National Rail) (1 Ecclesbourne Valley Railway)

Other information
- Station code: DFI
- Classification: DfT category F2

History
- Original company: North Midland Railway
- Pre-grouping: Midland Railway
- Post-grouping: London, Midland and Scottish Railway

Key dates
- 1841: Opened
- 1867: Moved to junction with Wirksworth branch

Passengers
- 2020/21: ▼14,204
- 2021/22: ▲39,902
- 2022/23: ▲47,482
- 2023/24: ▲56,306
- 2024/25: ▲66,536
Location
Notes
- Passenger statistics from the Office of Rail and Road

Duffield railway station serves the town of Duffield in Derbyshire, England. The station is located on the Midland Main Line, between Derby and Leeds, 133 miles 8 chains (214.2 km) north of London St Pancras. The unstaffed station is served by East Midlands Railway, which operates local services from Derby to Matlock, via the Derwent Valley Line. It is also a junction with the former branch line to Wirksworth, which is now operated as the Ecclesbourne Valley heritage railway.

== History ==
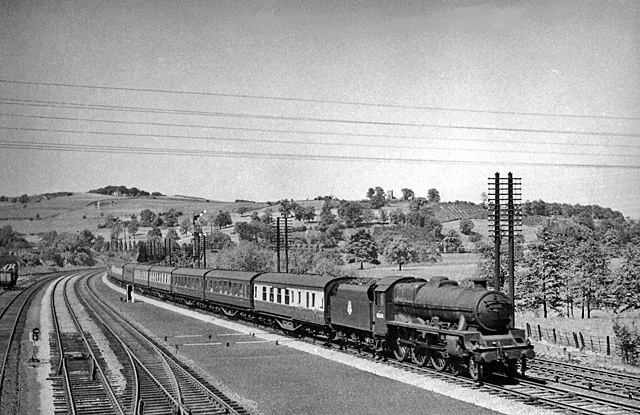
'Jubilee' Class 4-6-0, named Leander, passing through Duffield in 1957

The first station at Duffield was built in 1841, a year after the line opened, by the North Midland Railway a few yards further north from its present position.

From 1840, there had been a number of proposals for a line from Manchester down the Churnet Valley to meet either the Birmingham and Derby Junction Railway or the Midland Counties Railway, and then go on to London. An amendment was put forward in 1844 bringing the line to the North Midland at Duffield, presumably via Ashbourne and the Ecclesbourne Valley; however, the line never materialised.

The Midland Railway (MR) was looking for a path into Manchester as an alternative to the former Manchester, Buxton, Matlock and Midland Junction Railway from Ambergate to Rowsley which it leased jointly with the LNWR. It built a junction at Duffield and began to construct the line, which opened as far as Wirksworth in 1867. When the MR gained sole control of the Ambergate line in 1871, the extension proved unnecessary; however, the Wirksworth branch remained a busy line, with a regular passenger service and freight in the form of limestone from Wirksworth and milk from the farms along the line.

In 1867, a large new station was built in the vee of the junction, with platforms on each side of the double track. A signal box was provided to the east of the main line, replaced by the Duffield Junction box around 1890 at the south end of platform 1. By this time, the village's population had increased with railway workers and management, as had traffic on the main line. In 1897, a goods line was laid in the up (southbound) direction and a fourth, down goods, laid in 1904.

At this stage, there were two platforms with a footbridge, the second being an island between the two passenger lines and another for the branch. The two subsidiary platforms each had a waiting room, while the main platform building contained the waiting room, ticket and luggage offices. Next to the footbridge was a separate W.H. Smith bookstall. The station master's house was separate, being beside the track to the north, and there was small luggage store just outside the gate. The Wirksworth branch had severed the main road, which had been diverted; a footbridge gave access across the line. To the north of the station, there was a wide level crossing which, besides allowing luggage trolleys to cross, gave access for the farmer who owned the adjacent land. Next to this was a footbridge from the front of the station to the field behind, and between them two signal posts with, until 1910, a station signal box supplementing Duffield Junction. After that, the station changed little over the years until 1969; in 1947, at the time passenger services were withdrawn on the Wirksworth branch, the signal posts were replaced with a fabricated steel gantry and upper-quadrant signals. Some time later, the passenger footbridge was rebuilt in brick using the existing walkway.

In the 1960s, the station became unstaffed and the buildings were removed in 1969, except for the station master's house which became a private residence and the small luggage store which was just outside the gate. These have also been demolished subsequently.

In July 2005, the station was adopted by WyvernRail plc under a scheme promoted by the Friends of the Derwent Valley Line. WyvernRail undertook to provide care and maintenance of Duffield station on behalf of Central Trains (who operated the station at that time) and continue to do so for East Midlands Railway.

Ecclesbourne Valley Railway passenger services extended to Duffield in April 2011, allowing heritage trains from Wirksworth to connect here with the Midland Main Line. Through ticketing is available from all main line stations.

=== Historic gallery ===
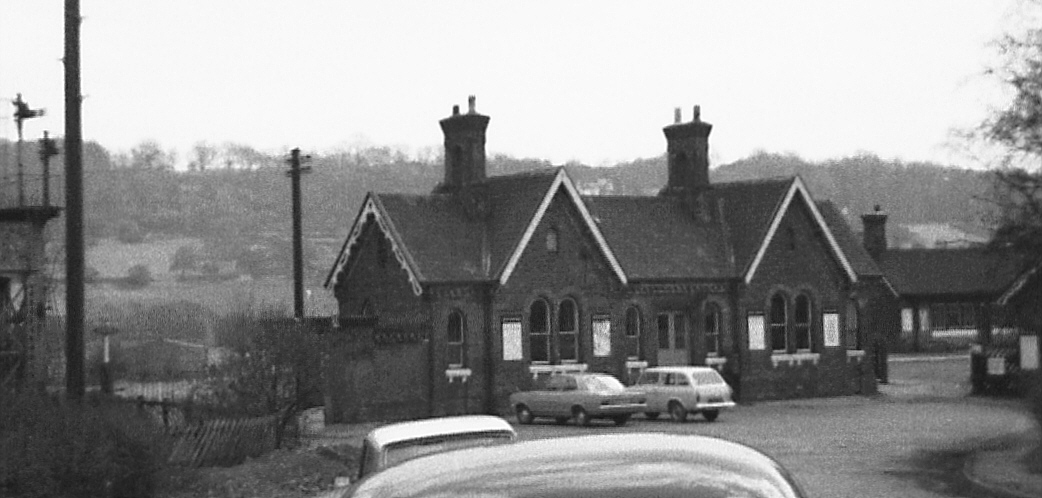
Station Approach

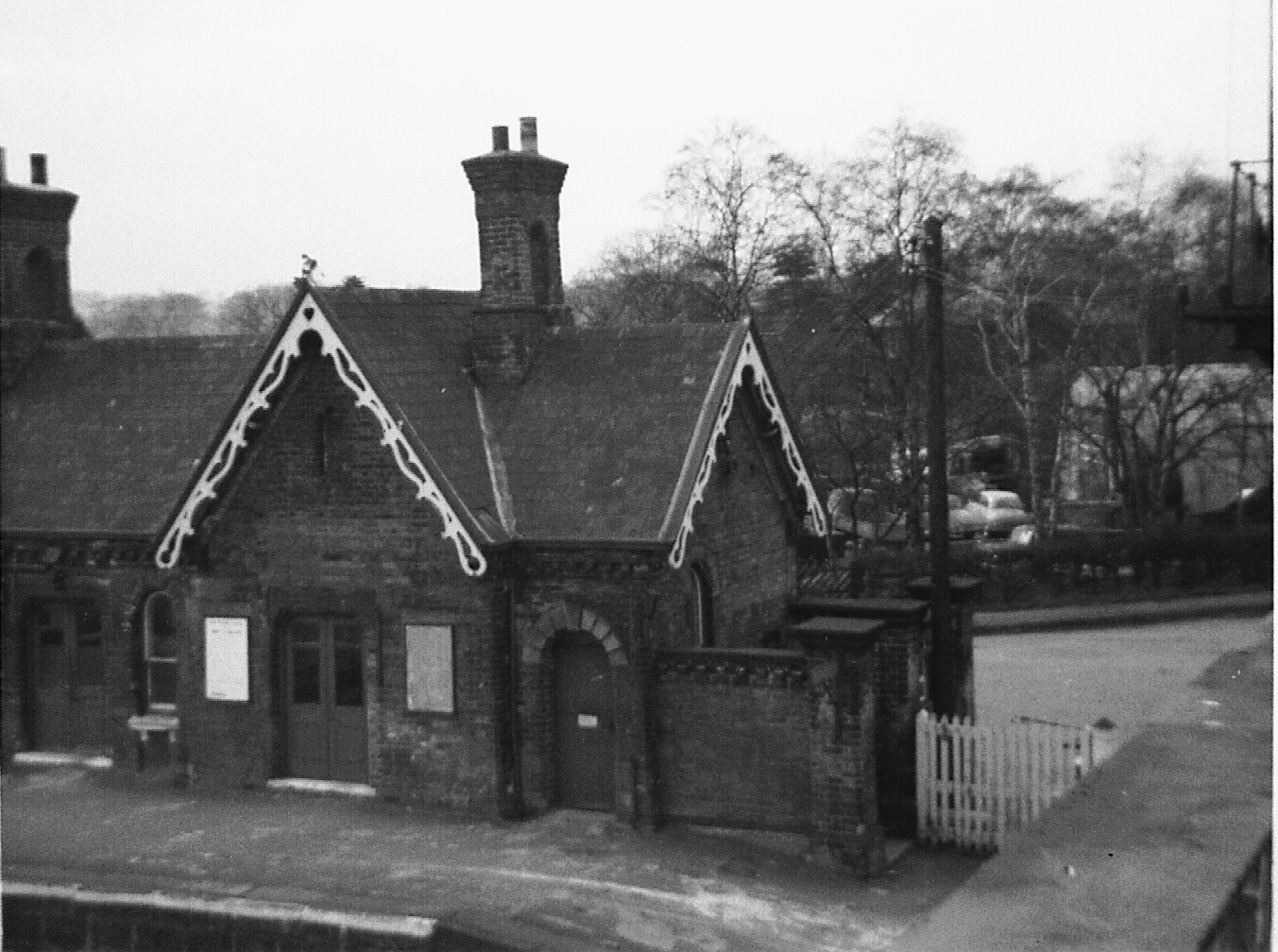
The booking office with the crossing gate

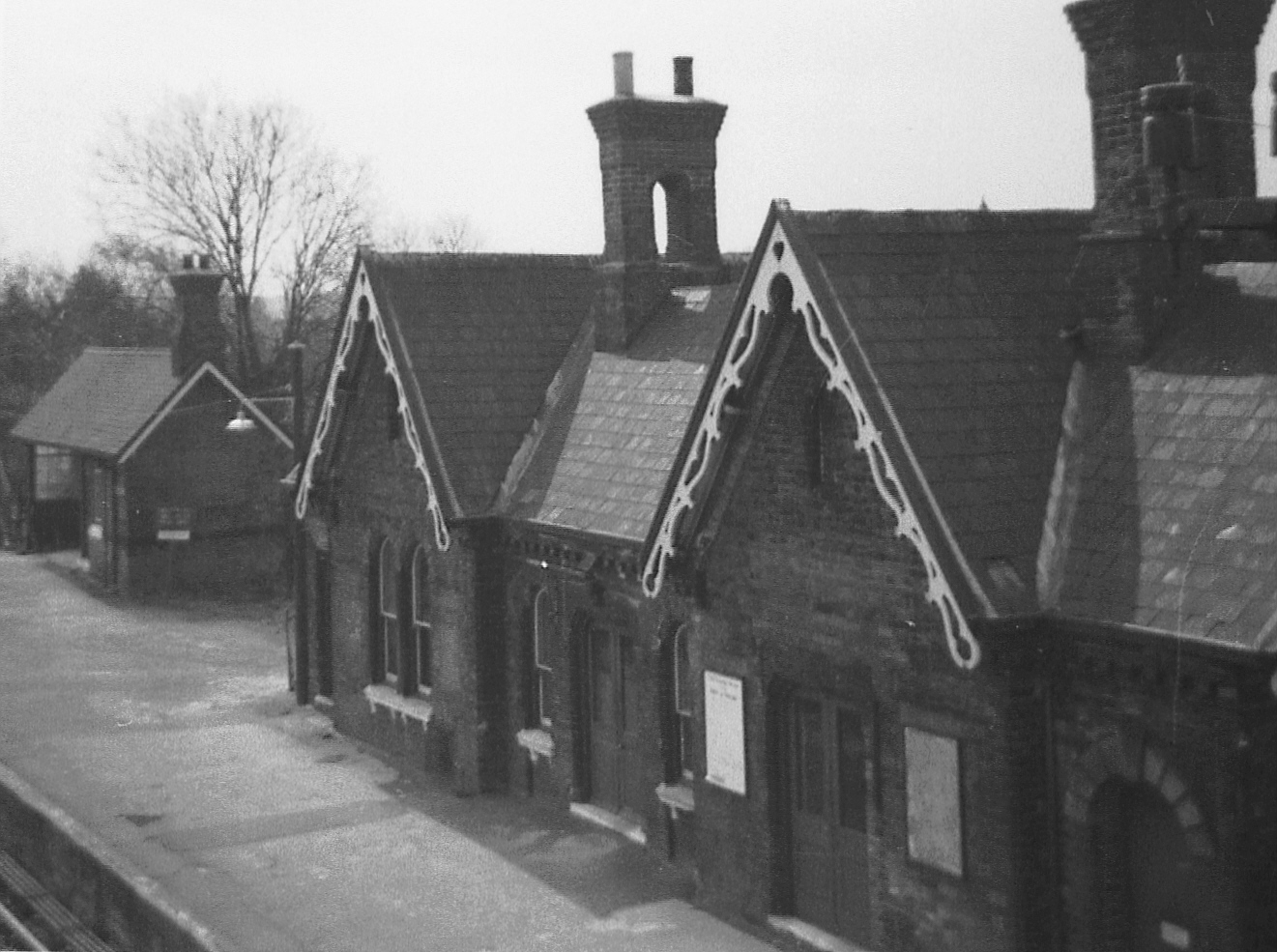
Platform 1 waiting room, with a W.H.Smith bookstall behind

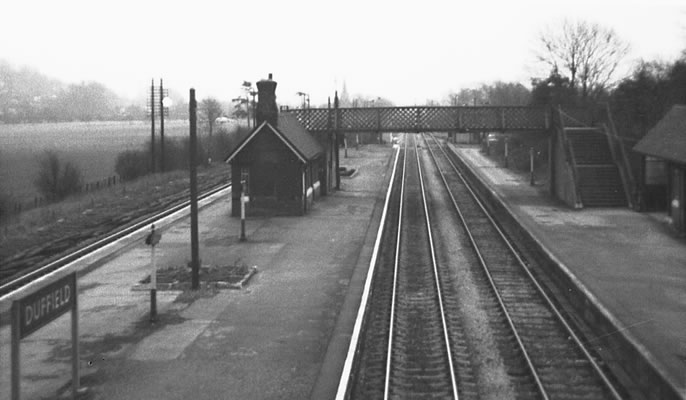
A view south from the footbridge

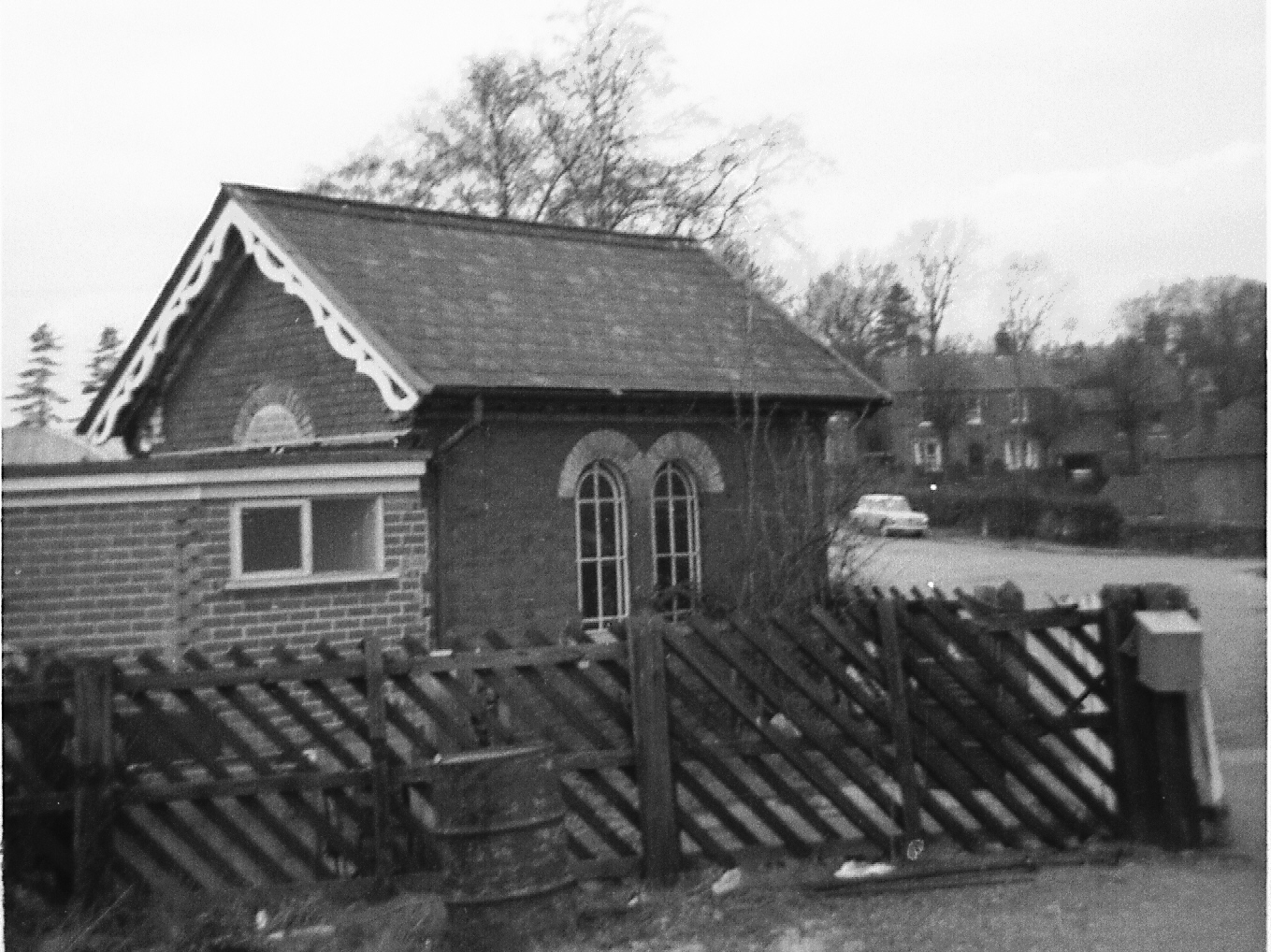
The luggage shed beside the entrance gate

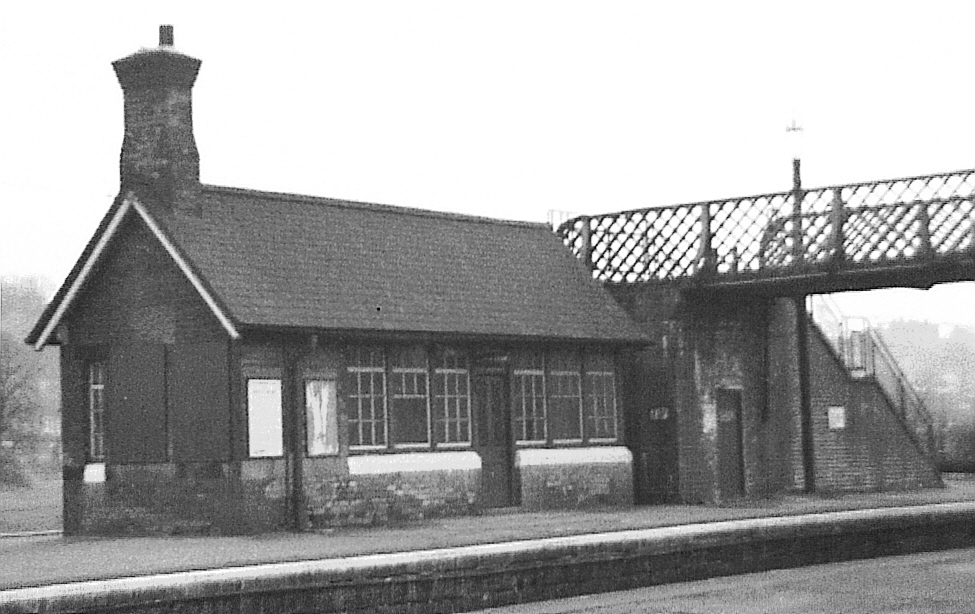
The waiting room on platform 2

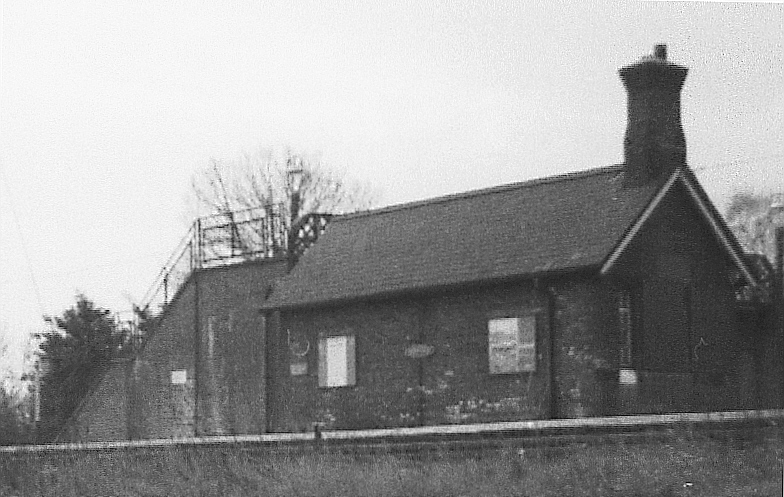
A rear view of the island platform

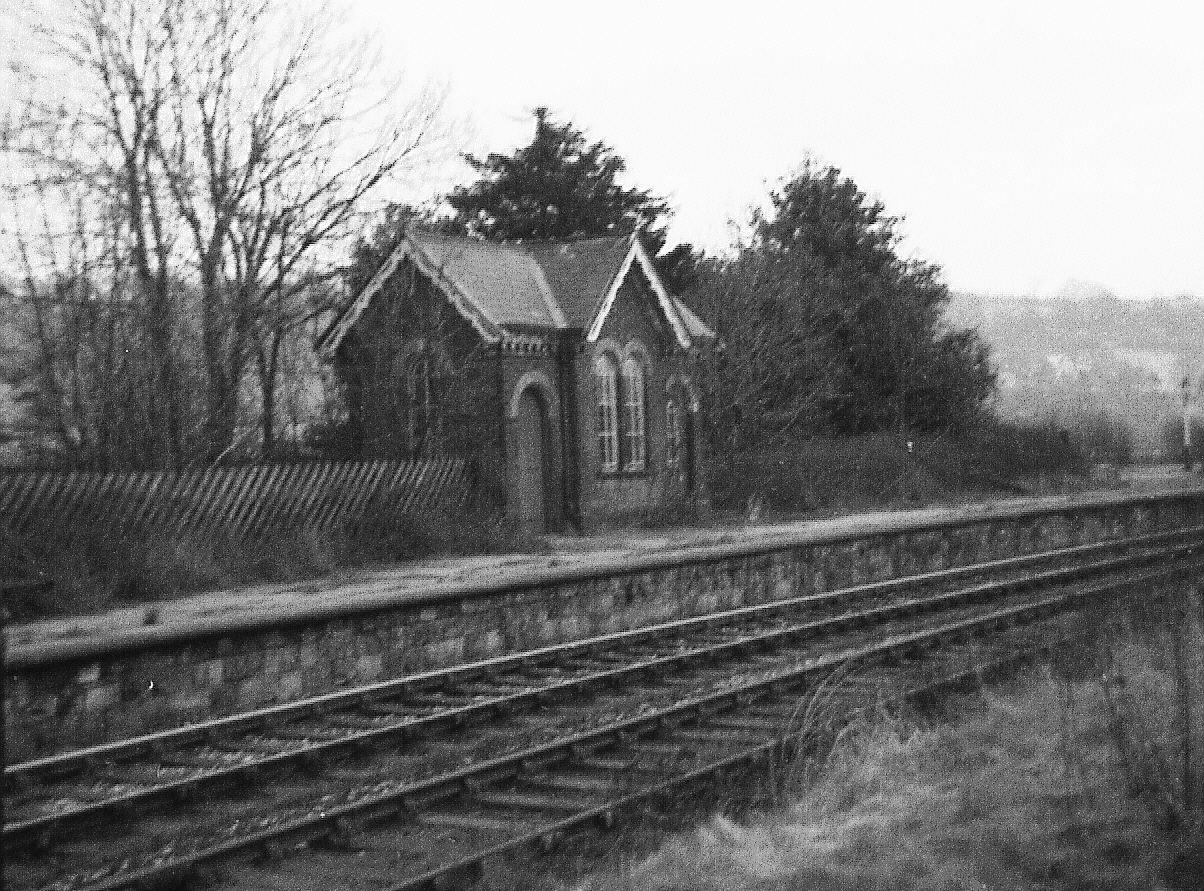
The waiting room on the Wirksworth platform

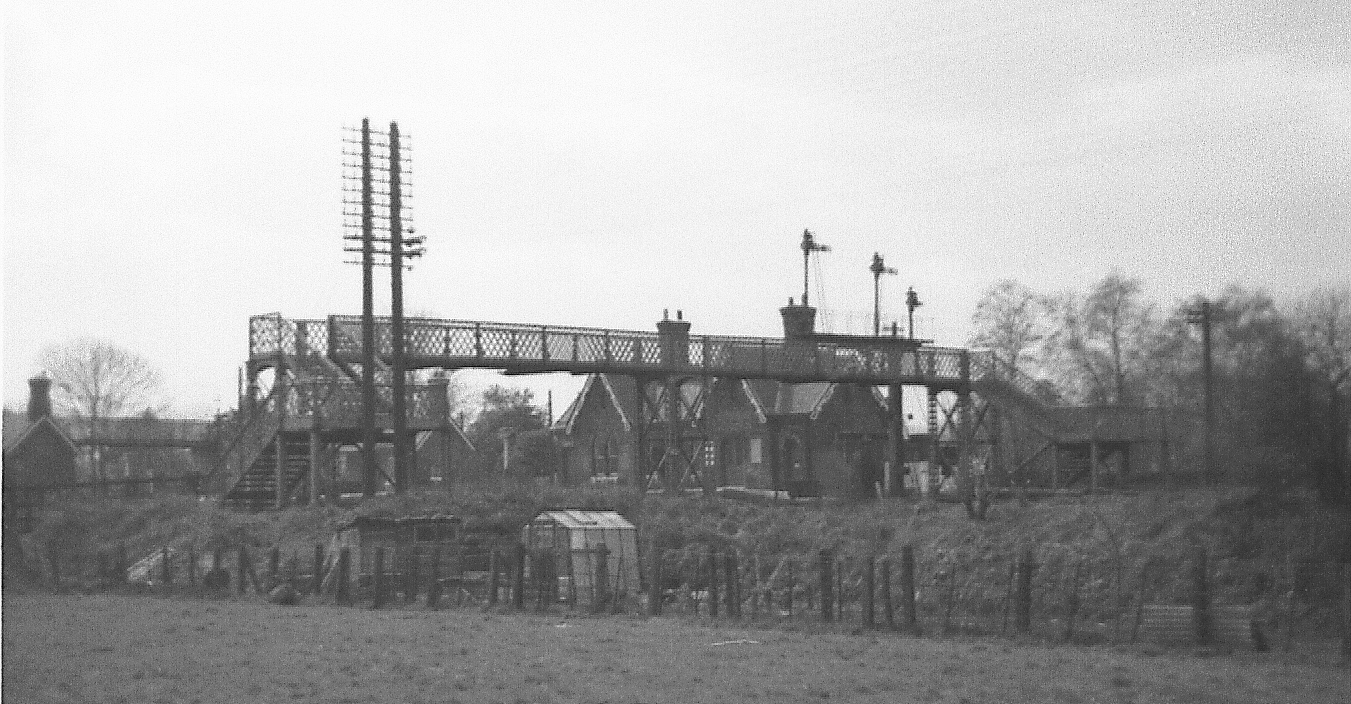
The footbridge

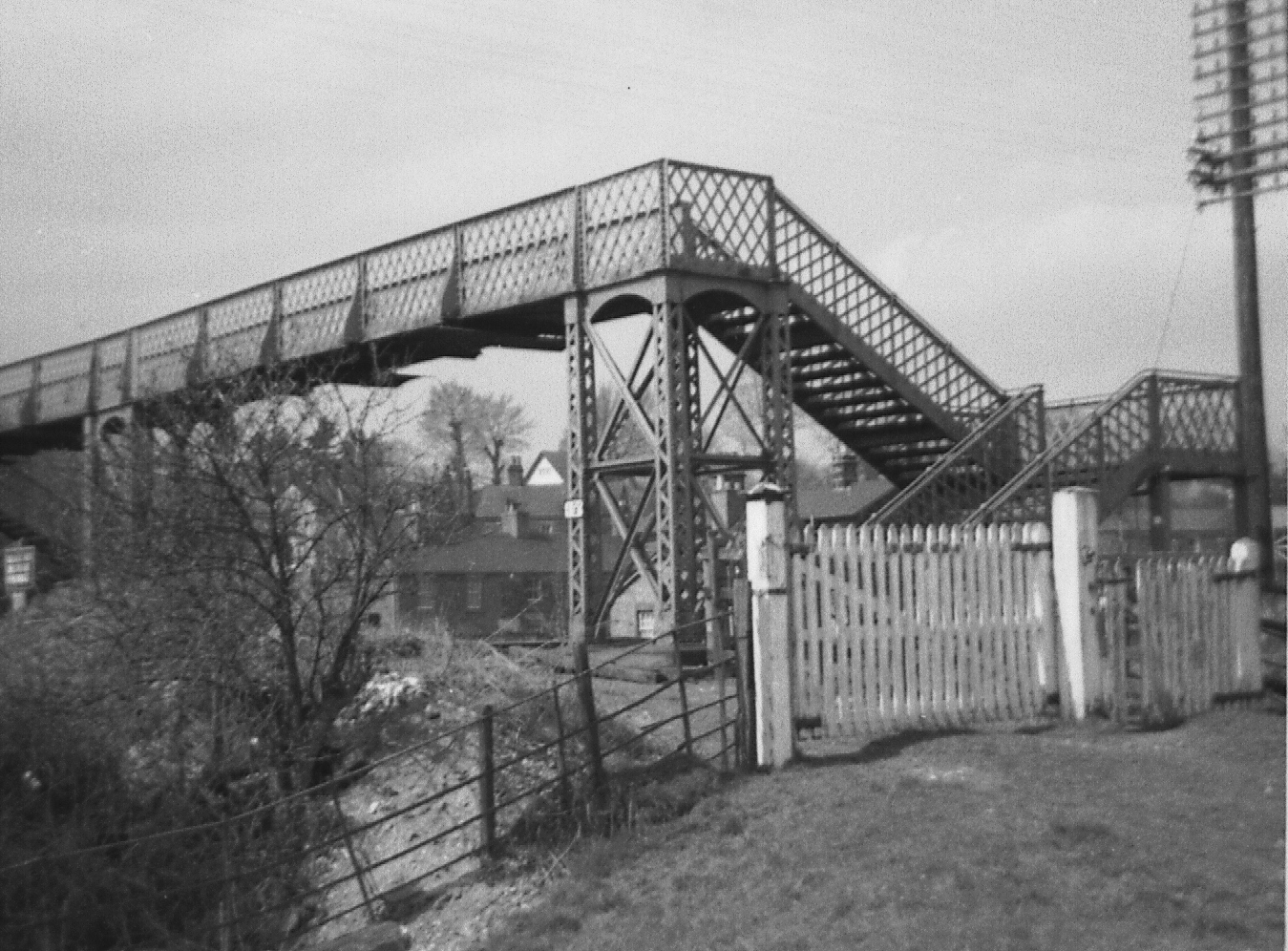
A closer view of the footbridge

== Services ==
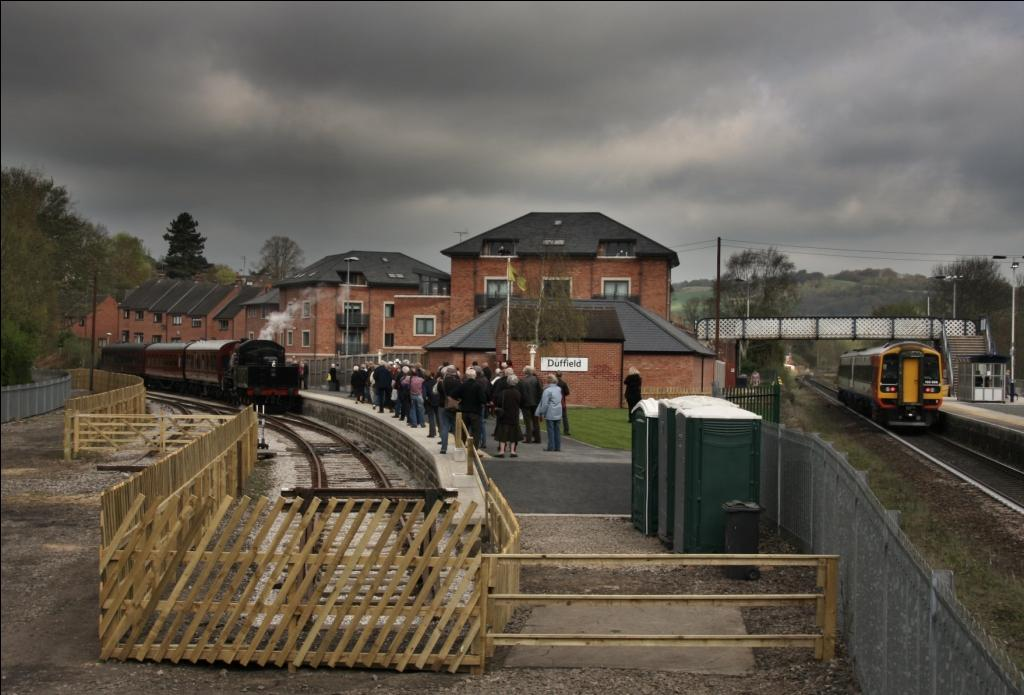
The branch platform used by the Ecclesbourne Valley Railway, April 2011. On the left is a steam train recently arrived from Wirksworth, whilst on the right is an East Midlands Trains service to Matlock. At this time, there was no physical connection between the EVR and the National Rail network here.

=== National Rail ===
National Rail services at Duffield are operated by East Midlands Railway, using Class 170 or Class 158 diesel multiple units.

The typical off-peak service is one train per hour in each direction to and from Matlock and Lincoln, via Derby, Nottingham and Newark Castle with one train every two hours extending to Cleethorpes.On Sundays, the station is served by hourly.

=== Heritage ===
The Ecclesbourne Valley Railway runs services to Wirksworth, via Shottle and Idridgehay. Timetables vary during the year, with more services at weekends and school holidays; patterns include yellow, purple and green days. Trains only run to Ravenstor on special event days.

Preceding station	National Rail	Following station
Belper	East Midlands Railway Derwent Valley Line	Derby
Preceding station	Heritage railways	Following station
Shottle towards Wirksworth	Ecclesbourne Valley Railway	Terminus
Historical railways
Hazelwood Line open, station closed	Midland Railway Wirksworth Branch	Terminus
