= Alton, Derbyshire =

Village in Derbyshire, England

Coordinates: 53.174°N 1.46°W

Alton
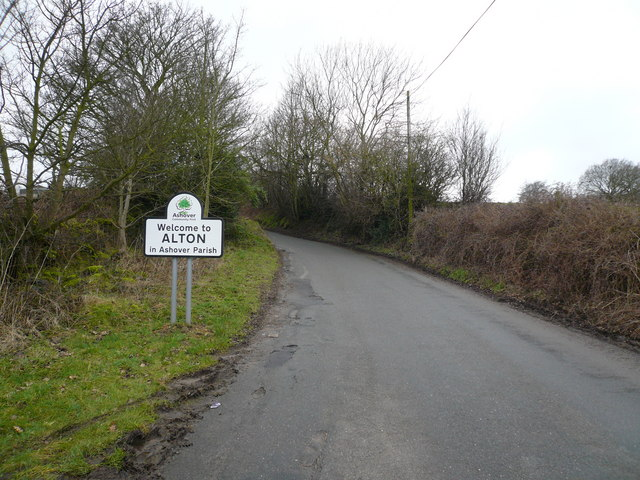
- Alton village

- Location within Derbyshire
- OS grid reference: SK361642
- District: North East Derbyshire
- Shire county: Derbyshire
- Region: East Midlands
- Country: England
- Sovereign state: United Kingdom
- Post town: CHESTERFIELD
- Postcode district: S42
- Dialling code: 01246
- Police: Derbyshire
- Fire: Derbyshire
- Ambulance: East Midlands

Alton is a very small village in Derbyshire, England. Alton is in the civil parish of Ashover, and is around 2 miles away from Clay Cross although it is not part of the town. The village does not have a church, a school or a public house; the nearest public house is in Ashover. Being a rural community, Alton is surrounded by several farms.

Alton also has easy access to local landmark Ashover Rock, or the Fabrick as it is locally known.

== See also ==
- Listed buildings in Idridgehay and Alton
- List of places in Derbyshire
