= Wirksworth railway station =

Heritage railway station in Derbyshire, England

Wirksworth
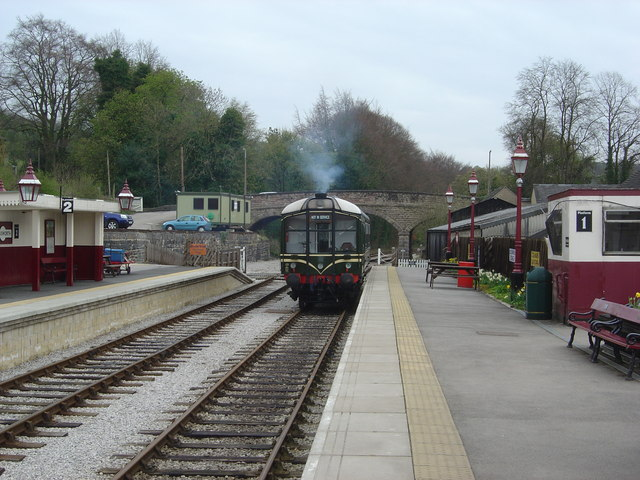

General information
- Location: Wirksworth, Derbyshire; England
- Coordinates: 53.0832°N 1.569°W
- Grid reference: SK289540
- Operated by: Ecclesbourne Valley Railway
- Platforms: 3

History
- Original company: Midland Railway

Key dates
- 1 October 1867: Opened
- 16 June 1947: Closed to passengers
- 4 December 1989: Closed to goods
- 1 October 2002: Reopened
Location

Wirksworth railway station is a stop on the heritage Ecclesbourne Valley Railway that serves the town of Wirksworth in Derbyshire, England. It was the former terminus of the Midland Railway's Wirksworth branch line, leaving the Midland Main Line at Duffield.

== History ==
The station was opened by the Midland Railway on 1 October 1867; it was designed by the Midland Railway's company architect John Holloway Sanders.

Dale Quarry was opened in 1874, 0.7 miles (1.1 km) west of the station yard. Stone was initially conveyed by horse and cart, but plans for a tramway were unpopular as it would have passed through the town. A standard gauge tunnel was built under the town, linking the quarry and the station yard; it was opened on 17 November 1877.

The final timetabled service ran between Derby and Wirksworth on 14 June 1947, although the line remained listed as 'suspended' for another two years before final closure in 1949. The station yard remained in use for the carriage of stone, as the surrounding quarries and mineral lines were still operational. This resulted in the demolition of the station buildings in 1968, as the space was needed for construction of freight facilities.

In mid-1984, the station was the terminus for a number of test runs of the then newly introduced Class 150 Sprinter diesel multiple units, which were later combined with charity fundraising special excursions known as the Wirksworth Phoenix.

The station was reopened on 1 October 2002 by Mr George Repton, who had been an engine driver on the line and Wirksworth's deputy mayor.

== Facilities ==
The station has the following amenities:

- Booking hall with seating area
- Waiting room
- Station café
- The Apollo bar
- Picnic and play area
- The Quarry line: a 2 ft narrow gauge line and 5 inch gauge miniature railway
- Historical railway museum
- Model railway layouts, including N and OO scale (open on operating weekends)
- Car park, with 100 spaces.

== Service ==
The Ecclesbourne Valley Railway runs services to Duffield, via Shottle and Idridgehay. Timetables vary daily during the year, with more services at weekends and school holidays; patterns include yellow, purple and green days. Trains only run to Ravenstor on special event days.

Services to Duffield operate from platform 2 and to Ravenstor from platform 3; platform 1 is not generally used for passenger services, due to the lack of pointwork locks at its southern end.

Preceding station	Heritage railways	Following station
Terminus	Ecclesbourne Valley Railway Main Line	Idridgehay towards Duffield
Ravenstor Terminus	Ecclesbourne Valley Railway Special events only	Terminus
Historical railways
Terminus	Midland Railway; Wirksworth Branch	Idridgehay

== In popular culture ==
- In June 2007, Wirksworth was used as the fictional station of Lightbourne in the BBC television series Casualty.
- In August 2009, the station was also used under the fictional guise of Castlebury for the BBC drama "Five Days II"; it was aired between 1 and 5 March 2010.
