= Ecclesbourne Valley Railway =

Heritage railway in Derbyshire, England

Coordinates: 53.0832°N 1.569°W

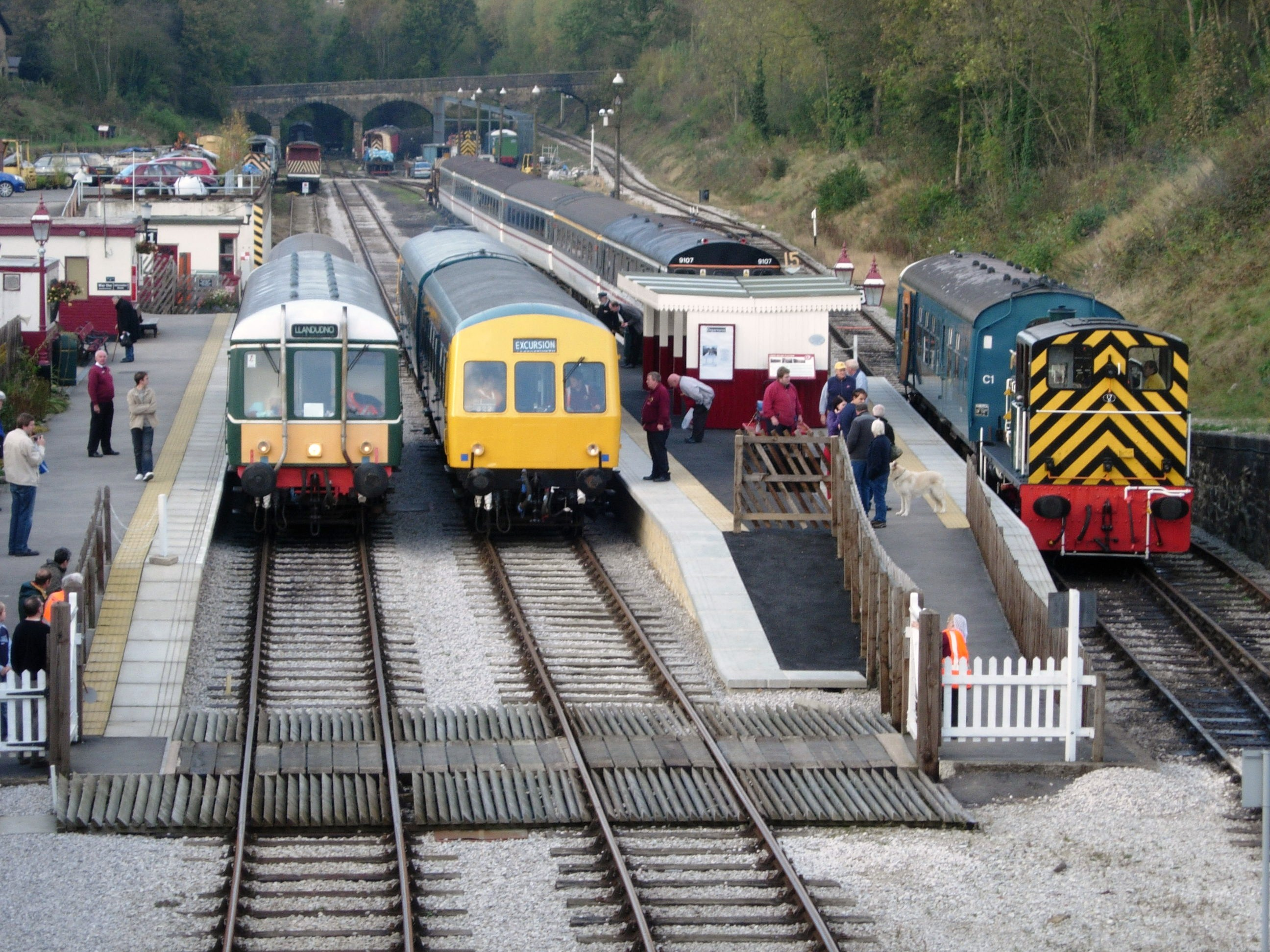
- Wirksworth station in 2007
- Locale: Derbyshire, England
- Terminus: Ravenstor; Duffield

Commercial operations
- Name: Wirksworth branch
- Built by: Midland Railway
- Original gauge: 4 ft 8 1/2 in (1,435 mm) standard gauge

Preserved operations
- Operated by: WyvernRail plc
- Stations: 5 (to be 6)
- Length: 9 miles (14 km)
- Preserved gauge: 4 ft 8 1/2 in (1,435 mm)

Commercial history
- Opened: 1867
- Closed to passengers: 1947
- Closed: 1964 (goods); 1989 (completely)

Preservation history
- 1992: WyvernRail is formed
- 1996: Light Rail order granted
- 1997: Derby and Wirksworth Railway Association is formed (later to become EVR)
- 2000: Volunteers start clearing vegetation from the line
- 1 October 2002: Wirksworth reopens and its passenger train services begin
- 2003: WyvernRail and Network Rail agrees 15 year lease-purchase deal
- 2004: Gorsey Bank reopens and 1/2 mile (0.8 km), passenger trains begin
- 1 September 2005: Ravenstor opens and 3/4 mile (1.2 km) passenger trains on 4% gradient (of the same name) begin
- 2007: Iridgehay level crossing reinstated and later reopened
- 8 March 2008: Idridgehay reopens and 3 1/2 miles (5.6 km) passenger trains begin
- 8 April 2011: Duffield reopens and 10 miles (16 km) passenger trains begin
- 9 August 2014: Shottle reopens (after more than 65 years out of use)
- Headquarters: Wirksworth

Website
- https://www.e-v-r.com/

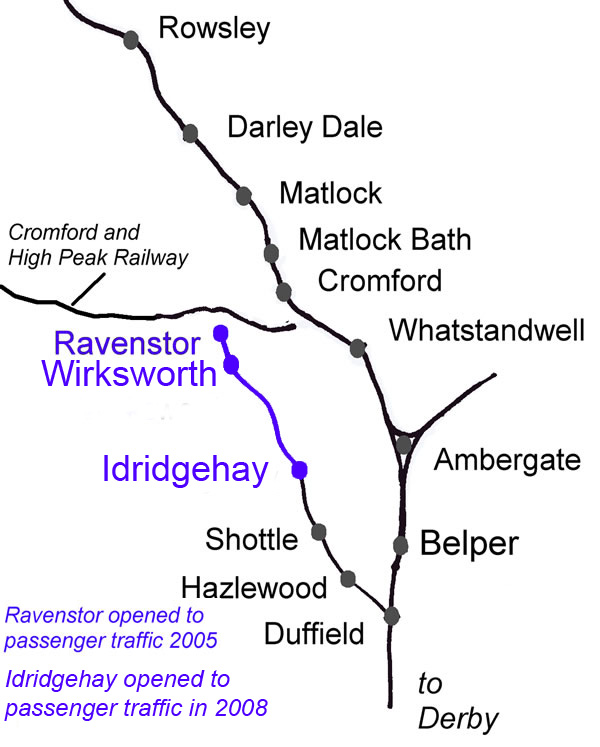
The route of the railway, running north from Duffield, via Wirksworth, to Ravenstor

The Ecclesbourne Valley Railway is a 9-mile (14.5 km) long heritage railway based at Wirksworth station in Derbyshire, England. It operates passenger services between Duffield and Wirksworth, with occasional services to Ravenstor.

Passengers can board and alight heritage services at Duffield, where a platform was reopened in 2011. The station is shared with National Rail services on the Midland Main Line between Sheffield and London St Pancras, with local services between Newark Castle, Nottingham, Derby and Matlock, which call at platforms 1 and 2; EVR trains to Wirksworth use platform 3. The station is sited in Duffield village centre, just a few minutes from shops, cafés and pubs.

The Ecclesbourne Valley Railway is named after the River Ecclesbourne and the track follows the river from its source to its confluence with the River Derwent at the Derbyshire village of Duffield.

Despite being a branch in itself, there is also a separate 1/2 mile (0.8 km) branch operating from platform 3 at Wirksworth, up a 4% incline to Ravenstor (for the National Stone Centre and the High Peak Trail).

The line is operated by heritage steam locomotives, including no. 2746 Bagnall saddle tank engine The Duke, and diesels include a BRCW Type 3 and a Brush Type 2.

== History ==
=== Origin ===
The Wirksworth Branch was the product of early 19th century railway rivalry. Since 1835, Wirksworth's citizens had been promoting various ideas for a branch line from the North Midland Railway, later the Midland Railway, at Duffield. The Midland was initially unenthusiastic, but then realised that the branch could be extended to Rowsley, albeit with difficulty, avoiding the section from Ambergate, on its Manchester, Buxton, Matlock and Midlands Junction Railway, which was shared with its rival the London and North Western Railway (LNWR). It is for this reason that all of the bridges along the line, including the one which simply has a head shunt under it (Cemetery Lane), are built to the double-tracked grand Midland Railway style.

=== Construction ===
The 8 1/2-mile (13.7 km) line was surveyed in 1862 and received Parliamentary assent in the following year. It would follow the valley of the River Ecclesbourne with no major obstacles apart from the final climb into Wirksworth. A cutting was required and some buildings were demolished, while there was considerable upheaval in Duffield.

The final inspection of the line was carried out by Colonel J.A. Rich of the Royal Engineers on 26 September 1867, who approved the line for opening.

The line was opened to Wirksworth on 1 October 1867 and was worked initially by the Staff System.

Under the original scheme, it would have descended from Wirksworth to Cromford using a 1,503-yard (1,374 m) tunnel and a 280-yard (260 m) long viaduct, then proceed parallel to the existing line, but on the west side of the river through Matlock to Rowsley.

However, when the lease expired on the original Ambergate line, the LNWR withdrew and the Midland acquired complete control; thus the section beyond Wirksworth was never built. The Midland was left with one of its few branch lines, and one which, it felt, was of questionable viability.

=== Operation ===
The presence of the line allowed Wirksworth's limestone business to develop, the carriage of which was its mainstay until the middle of the 20th century. There was also farm produce, particularly milk, 800,000 imp gal (960,760 US gal; 3,636,872 L) in 1906, and a number of textile mills (Wirksworth had the dubious distinction of being the main supplier of red tape for the London Government Departments). It saw a regular passenger service, with stations at Hazlewood (about 1/2 mile (0.8 km) from the village down a steep hill and originally called Windley), Shottle (originally Cowers Lane) and Idridgehay.

There were three, rising to six, passenger trains from Derby each way, with one on Sunday, and two goods trains. However, by 1939, milk was carried instead by road and, during World War II, passenger travel was severely curtailed. There was also the hourly no. 37 bus, which led to a decline in passenger numbers. Passenger trains were temporarily suspended in 1947 and were officially ceased in 1949. An hourly (five on Sundays) direct bus service (Trentbarton route 6.1) still operates (2014) between Wirksworth and Derby with a journey time of 50 minutes.

Rolling stock at various times included steam motor carriages from the Morecambe and Heysham Railway at the beginning of the century, and steam railmotors from the Yarmouth & North Norfolk Railway. In the early 1950s, people near the line were treated to the eerie sight of a railway carriage ghosting along, apparently by itself – the test vehicle for the new diesel railcars being designed in Derby – nothing more than a standard coach with the mechanism fitted and a windscreen cut in each end for the driver – that presaged a major change in British rail travel. When the so-called Derby Lightweights were produced, they were each tested on the line after leaving the workshop. One of the only three surviving of those originally built, M79900, was converted from being the IRIS test car back to passenger carrying standard and has been joined recently by the other two, residing on the line on which they were originally tested some 60 years ago.

=== Rail accident ===
On 25 August 1981, a rail accident occurred when a fully laden freight train partially derailed 300 yards (270 m) south of Wirksworth.

=== Decline and closure ===
Although most of the goods had transferred to the roads, limestone traffic continued, including that formerly hauled by the Cromford and High Peak Railway, when it closed in 1967. Though the amount of traffic justified the installation of some continuous welded rail in the 1980s, production was increasingly of aggregate carried by road. In 1991, the quarries passed to Croxton and Garry Ltd (which later became Omya UK) which no longer needed a rail link. Although its sidings, and the station goods yard, at Wirksworth are still listed by Network Rail, the connection to the main line at Duffield has been severed and fenced off. There is hope that one day the EVR could, "once possible funding would be made", purchase and reuse both the goods yard and the sidings for further/extra space for some rolling stock and train storage.

== Present day ==
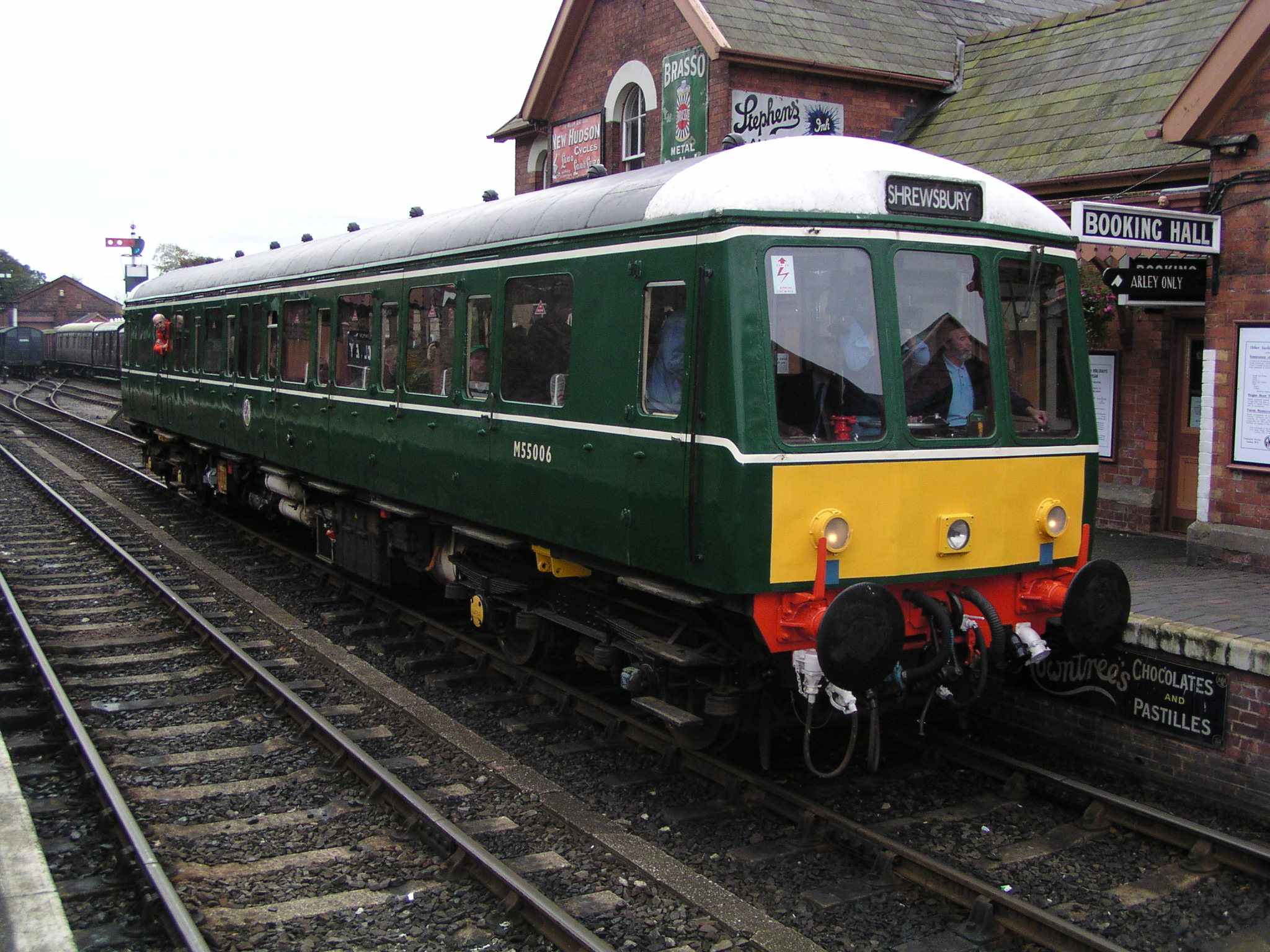
Class 122, no. 55006, operating away from home, at Bewdley on the Severn Valley Railway on 15 October 2004, whilst taking part in the Railcar 50 event. This unit is painted in original BR Green livery, and is usually based at Wirksworth.

=== Preservation ===
In 1996, WyvernRail was awarded the Duffield and Wirksworth Light Railway Order 1996 (SI 1996/2660) for the full length of the whole line under the Light Railways Act 1896.

Wirksworth station was reopened in 2002, with the first 1/2 mile (0.80 km) of line between Wirksworth and Gorsey Bank reopened for a DMU shuttle passenger service in 2004, followed by a new line to Ravenstor in 2005. On 8 March 2008, the railway began to branch its passenger operations further south by holding a grand opening ceremony for the line between Wirksworth and Idridgehay – 3 1/2 miles (5.6 km) of the line's total length.

In 2003, WyvernRail agreed a 15-year lease-purchase deal with Network Rail. In May 2005, it completed the purchase early and bought almost the entire railway. The only portion still leased is an area of the station yard in Wirksworth, which has been retained by Network Rail as a Strategic Rail Site and is on a rolling three-year lease to WyvernRail.

In July 2005, WyvernRail adopted Duffield station under a scheme promoted by the Friends of the Derwent Valley Line. They undertook to provide care and maintenance of the station on behalf of Central Trains, who operated it at that time.

The line has now been brought up to passenger-carrying standards to allow trains to run through from Wirksworth to Duffield. At Duffield, passengers can change for main line rail services by crossing from the branch platform (platform 3) to one of the Network Rail platforms (either platforms 1 or 2). There are intermediate stations at Idridgehay and Shottle.

=== Signalling and line operation ===
The railway principally operates on a token system, with the Wirksworth to Duffield section currently holding one token in the form of an Annett's key; the Wirksworth to Ravenstor incline holds a different Annett's key. Due to a ruling gradient on the line, the Wirksworth to Duffield section is protected by a trap-point just north of Wirksworth Station. The Wirksworth-Duffield line can now also be split in two sections with the installation of a passing loop at Shottle. This currently only happens on special events and bank holidays, as it requires two signalmen, one at each end of the loop, to be stationed for the day as there is currently no signal box to control movements in and out of the loop centrally. The former Oddingly crossing box is currently being restored for use as a signal box at Shottle. Two-train operation should be able to happen more regularly once it is finished.

An unusual piece of track work was installed at Wirksworth on platform 3. The track was interlaced (overlapping) either to allow the platform to be used for passenger trains or to allow wagons to collect stone from the adjacent dock. The interlaced section of track was operated by a manual tight point, but still came under the control of the Wirksworth-Ravenstor train token. This feature has since been removed, however, as it was no longer required.

There were (and currently still are) very few physical signals on the line, apart from indications at cross-overs. One semaphore signal was located almost underneath Cemetery Lane Bridge, but this has recently been relocated to Shottle station as part of the signalling project for the passing loop. Another electronic signal was located at Duffield station to warn that it is the end of the line. It is believed that this signal was permanently lit for nearly forty years, before being swept away in the reconstruction of the platform ready for the reopening.

=== Film and TV appearances ===
The railway has seen various filming projects take place:

- The first filming venture came in the form of the Hellmann's Mayonnaise "Big Dollop" TV advert.
- In 2004, the railway was used again to film the National Geographic Channel's Seconds from Disaster where their ex-Gatwick Express coaches were used to depict the Eschede train disaster from 1998.
- In 2006, a location just south of Wirksworth was used to film the ITV drama Mobile.
- In June 2007, Wirksworth was used as the fictional station of 'Lightbourne' in the BBC television series Casualty. The storyline involved both the Gatwick Express stock that is located on site, as well as Class 03 no. 03158 hauling an approaching goods train.

== Stations ==
Stations of the Ecclesbourne Valley Railway, from north to south.

Location	Status	Opened	Closed	Notes	Photograph
Ravenstor	open	1 September 2005		New station built by the EVR, opened 1 September 2005.	
Wirksworth	open	1 October 1867	16 June 1947	Building demolished, platforms rebuilt. Reopened 1 October 2002.	
Idridgehay	open	1 October 1867	16 June 1947	Building in private ownership, platform survived. Reopened 8 March 2008.	
Shottle	open	1 October 1867	16 June 1947	Building in private ownership, platform survived. Reopened 9 August 2014.	
Hazelwood	closed	1 October 1867	16 June 1947	Building in private ownership, platform demolished. Platform re-instatement and possible restoration being considered.	
Duffield	open	1841		Buildings demolished, branch platform survived, main platforms still in use by Derwent Valley Line. Reopened 8 April 2011.	

== Rolling stock ==
=== Steam locomotives ===
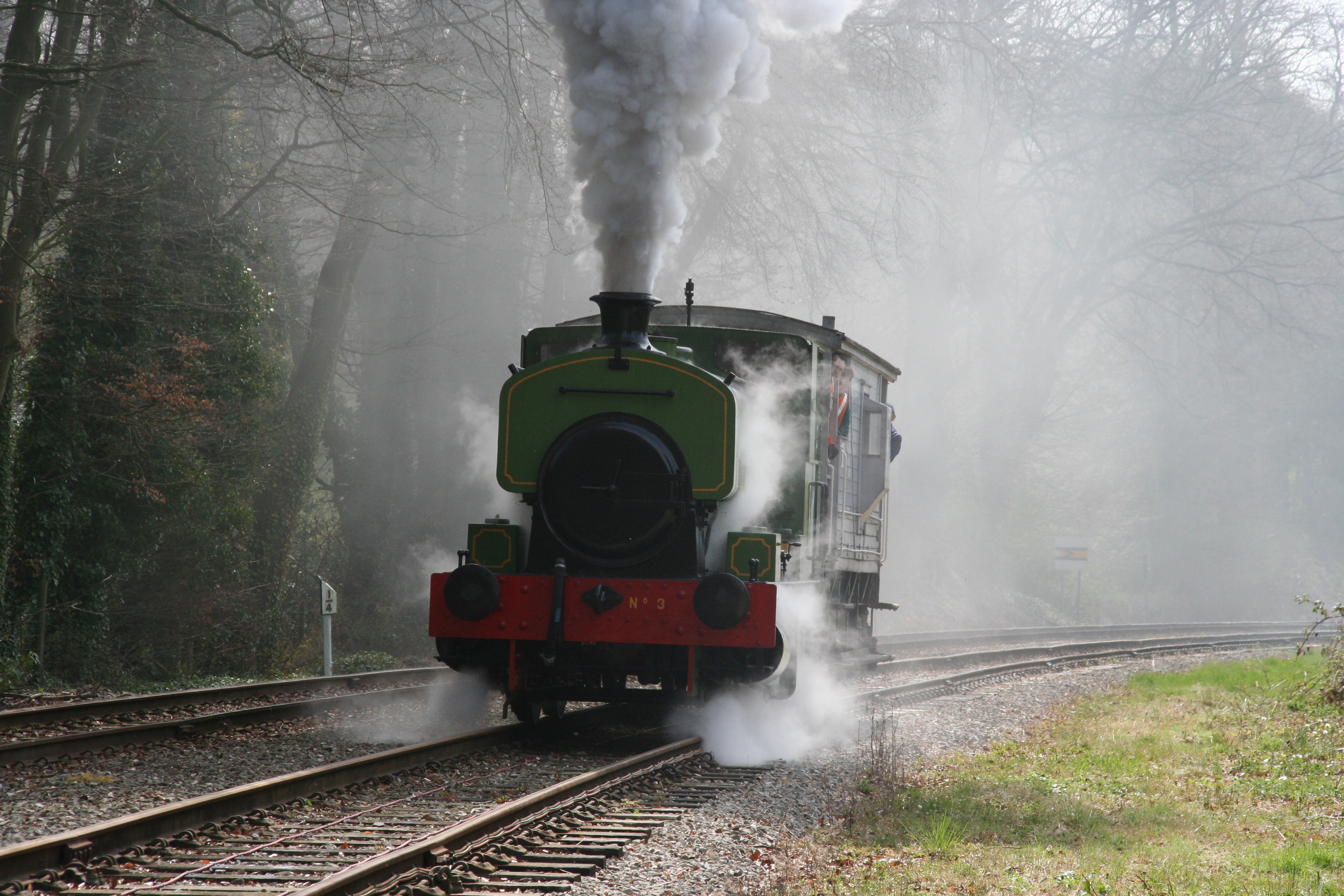
Ferrybridge no.3 on its first test run to Gorsey Bank after a total rebuild.

- Andrew Barclay 0-4-0T 2360 Brian Harrison (Ferrybridge No.3) built in 1954. – Undergoing repairs. Withdrawn in 2019, return to service anticipated for 2021. Boiler already back in frames after being overhauled by an external contractor.
- Hudswell Clarke 0-6-0T No 102 (works number 1884 of 1955) Cathryn built in 1944 – Under Restoration Boiler reintegrated with the frames following restoration to working condition at an external contractor. Locomotive currently in the final stages of reassembly, anticipated to be completed in 2021.
- Bagnall Austerity 0-6-0ST 2746 The Duke built in 1944 – Operational, returned to steam in December 2023 in a plain red livery. previously carried bogus BR identity 68012.
- BR Standard Class 4 2-6-4T no. 80080 built in 1954 – Operational, boiler ticket expires in 2028. On loan from the Midland Railway – Butterley.

=== Diesel multiple units ===
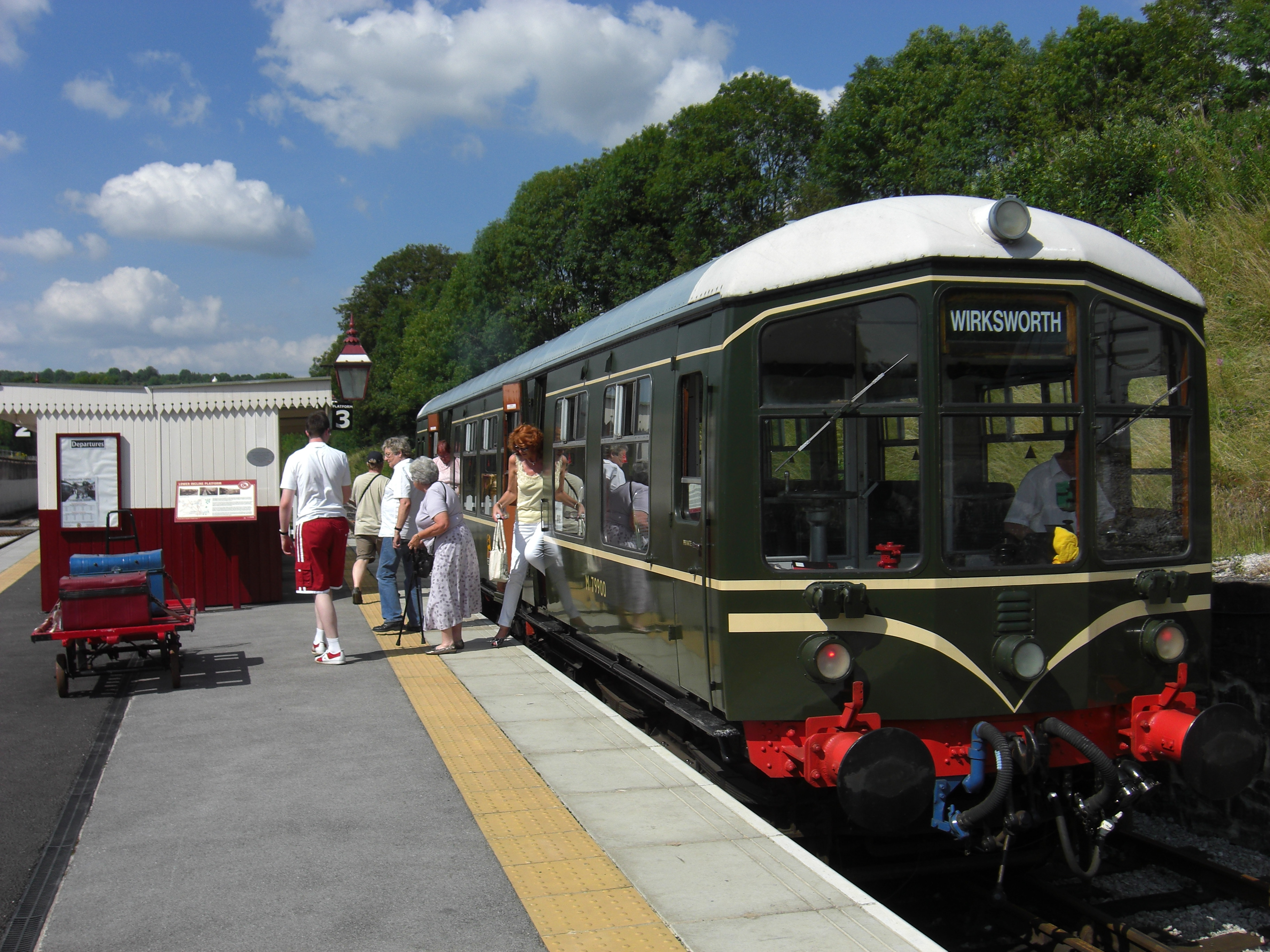
Derby Lightweight no. 79900 operating on the line on which it was originally tested when new some 55 years earlier, fully restored to passenger carrying standard from being former test car ”Iris”. It is now a preserved example of a Derby Lightweight single car unit. Has since moved to Great Central Railway.

The following diesel multiple unit vehicles run on the line:

- Class 101: no. E50170
- Class 101: no. E50253
- Class 101: no. E51505
- Class 101: no. E59303
- Class 101: no. M51188
- Class 108: no. E50599
- Class 119: no. W50173
- Class 122: no. W55006

== WyvernRail ==
WyvernRail Limited was established in 1992 as a community-owned and locally managed venture to restore and operate the Duffield to Wirksworth line.

The initial plan was to lease the line from Railfreight Construction (the British Rail sector then responsible for the line) and operate a community railway service between Wirksworth and Derby using leased diesel units, probably Class 142 Pacers. The model used was termed Open Access, a method of operation used by some operators today (most notably Hull Trains, Grand Central and Lumo). The Railways Act 1993 created the framework that would allow WyvernRail to start the process, but the industry structure the Act created also caused the whole process to slow down to a crawl.

The line's saving grace was the designation of Wirksworth station yard as a Strategic Freight Site, which meant that the yard was protected for railway use, thus making closure of the line extremely difficult. The line had already had a 'Near Death Experience' in 1990 when a track lifting train began to lift approximately 1 mile (1.6 km) of continuously welded track between Idridgehay and Shottle. Fortunately, the work was stopped by British Rail management as it was reported that there was the possibility of new stone traffic on the line. As a result, the line was mothballed and the strategic freight site designation meant that this status remains on the line to this day.

Changes to the structure of the industry following privatisation meant that, for several years during the mid-1990s, WyvernRail often experienced difficulty in maintaining a consistent relationship with the authorities responsible for the line. However, while progress was slow on the ground, WyvernRail remained active wherever possible. While the most significant achievement was the award of a Light Railway Order for the line in 1996, WyvernRail also investigated other projects. During this period, the company's approach changed from Open Access to a straight lease or purchase of the line. In 1997, the Derby and Wirksworth Railway Association was formed in response to growing interest in WyvernRail's activities. The Association grew slowly over the next three years but, after renaming itself the Ecclesbourne Valley Railway Association in 2000, membership took off when access to the line was finally granted.

For WyvernRail, progress began at accelerate in the summer of 2000, when Railtrack management not only took an interest in the firm's activities but provided a proactive and imaginative basis for negotiations, including granting the company's volunteers access to the line. This approach led to the gradual restoration of the line, conversion to a plc and the successful share launch of WyvernRail plc, which occurred in April 2002.
