= Ravenstor railway station =

Heritage railway station in Derbyshire, England

Ravenstor
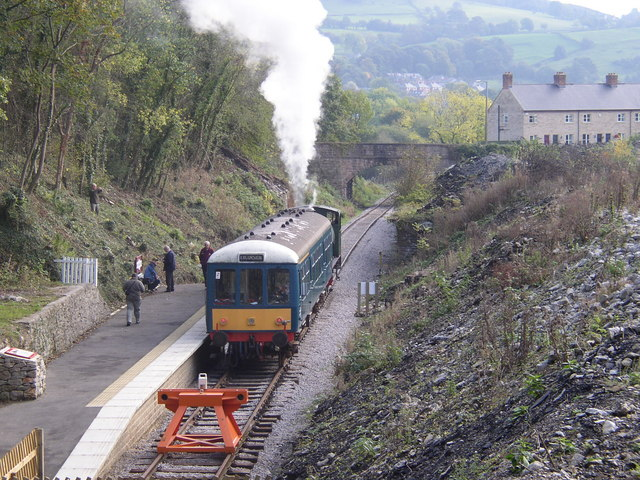

General information
- Location: Wirksworth, Derbyshire; England
- Coordinates: 53.0903°N 1.5728°W
- Grid reference: SK287548
- System: Station on heritage railway
- Operator: Ecclesbourne Valley Railway
- Platforms: 1

History
- Original company: Ecclesbourne Valley Railway

Key dates
- 1 September 2005: Opened
Location

Ravenstor railway station is the northernmost limit of the Ecclesbourne Valley Railway, a heritage railway branch line, in Wirksworth, Derbyshire, England.

== History ==
Ravenstor station came into existence through the activities of the Ecclesbourne Valley Railway Association (EVRA). Working with WyvernRail plc to reopen the former Wirksworth-Duffield branch line, the decision was made to create a passenger carrying service where previously only mineral traffic (limestone) had ever been transported. The particular interest lay in the fact that the line was on a steep incline of 1 in 27.

Work over a number of years, including the building of an entirely new platform, culminated in August 2005 with the opening of the line for passenger services. The first service ran on 1 September 2005 and the station was opened in a ceremony by Gwyneth Dunwoody MP, chair of the Transport Select Committee, on 2 September 2005.

== Location ==
Ravenstor was a former concentration site for local quarries and did not have a passenger service until one was introduced by the Ecclesbourne Valley Railway. It lies at the bottom of a disused incline, which was built to link it to the Cromford and High Peak Railway; it is now the site of the National Stone Centre and the Steeple Grange Light Railway.

It is hoped that a possible extension up the incline towards Middleton Top could be built, once funds are made available, depending how steep it would be. It would also serve the nearby National Stone Centre.

== Service ==
The full timetabled service at this station operated formerly at Ravenstor; trains ran to and from Duffield.

Regular services ceased in 2016; trains only run to the station on special event days.

Preceding station	Heritage railways	Following station
Terminus	Ecclesbourne Valley Railway Special events only	Wirksworth Terminus
