= Markeaton Brook =

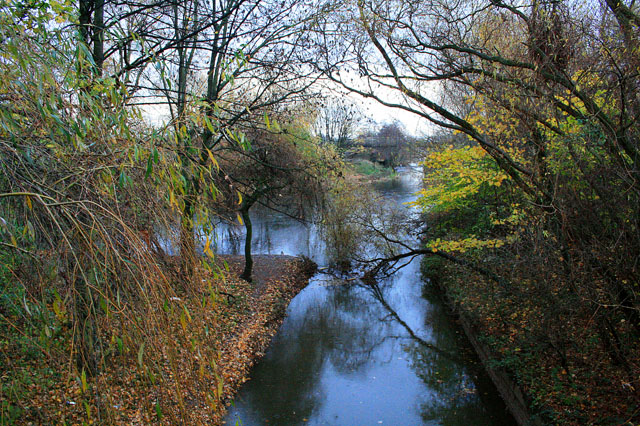
- Confluence of the Markeaton Brook with the River Derwent in Derby

Location
- Country: England
- Counties: Derbyshire
- Villages: Mercaston, Kedleston, Markeaton
- City: Derby

Physical characteristics
- Source
  - location: Hulland, Derbyshire
  - coordinates: 53.000°N 1.617°W
- Mouth
  - location: Derby, Derbyshire
  - coordinates: 52.920°N 1.465°W
- Length: 17 km (11 mi)
- Basin size: 64 km^{2} (25 sq mi)

Basin features
- Tributaries
  - left: Black Brook (Derbyshire)
  - right: Mackworth Brook
- Progression : Markeaton Brook—Derwent—Trent—Humber

Map of Derbyshire - showing the source and mouth of the Markeaton Brook

The Markeaton Brook is an 11-mile-long (17 km) tributary of the River Derwent in Derbyshire, England. The brook rises from its source south of Hulland Ward, and flows for most of its length through the countryside north-west of Derby before entering a culvert to the north of the city centre; it reappears from this culvert and runs through a short section of open channel on the other side of the city before joining the Derwent.

The brook is closely associated with the historical development and the early industrial heritage of Derby. Originally the course of the brook passed through the city in an open channel, but it was successively bridged and piped over the years, and by Victorian times it was almost completely covered. It is now hidden from view in a series of culverts as it flows beneath the centre of the city.

Although concealed, its presence could not be ignored, with a number of notable floods occurring in Derby before significant changes, including diversions and relief culverts were deemed necessary to prevent further inundations.

== Course ==
From its source south of Hulland Ward, the brook flows south-east where it is joined by the Black Brook, at Mercaston and is initially named after this village. To the south of Weston Underwood the name changes to the Cutler Brook, from where it flows through the parkland of Kedleston Hall. The channel through the park has been modified as part of the landscaping of the grounds in the 18th century into a series of lakes. Beside the upper lake is a neoclassical style boathouse and fishing room, beyond is a "very handsome stone bridge", where beneath the three arches, the brook also falls over a cascade.

Continuing in a south-east direction, the Cutler brook meets a minor tributary that flows from Quarndon and the name changes to become the Markeaton brook. The larger brook then flows into Markeaton Park, where it is joined by its largest tributary the Mackworth Brook which drains the area around Mackworth and Kirk Langley.

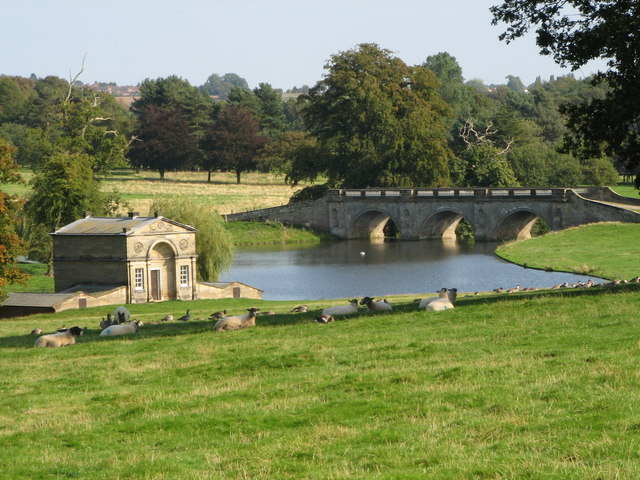
Kedleston Hall - Boat House and Bridge, where the brook has been landscaped into a series of lakes.

Various channels exist within the park; the brook takes the northern channel with flow also being diverted into Markeaton Lake. The channels rejoin at Britannia Mill and continue through the West End of Derby, until the brook reaches the start of the Markeaton Brook Culvert at Ford Street. This culvert takes the brook beneath the centre of Derby, where it flows under the Strand, Victoria and Albert Street, to an unseen confluence of the Bramble brook. It crosses beneath the Morledge, before it finally re-emerges from the culvert into the Mill Fleam at the Cockpit island, and then runs alongside the Bass recreation ground, until it reaches the River Derwent.

== Catchment ==
The brook and its tributaries drain a catchment area of 64 square kilometres (25 sq mi), which lies to the north-west of Derby, between that of the River Ecclesbourne to the north, and various tributaries of the lower Dove, including the Hilton Brook to the south and west. The drainage basin has an annual average rainfall of 750 millimetres (30 in), which is lower than the average of 828 millimetres (32.6 in) for England. The highest point in the catchment is at 212 metres (696 ft), near Crossways farm.

It has been estimated that during a large storm the catchment can generate a flow of 50 cubic metres per second (1,800 cu ft/s), within thirteen hours of intense rainfall. Summer flows are much smaller, with the brook producing a flow of only 0.35 cubic metres per second (12 cu ft/s).

The brook drains a catchment with a geology consisting of mainly Mercian mudstones and Siltstone, but with some Sandstone and Shales in the upper reaches. It has been designated as main river by the Environment Agency from Markeaton Park to its confluence with the Derwent.

== Mills ==
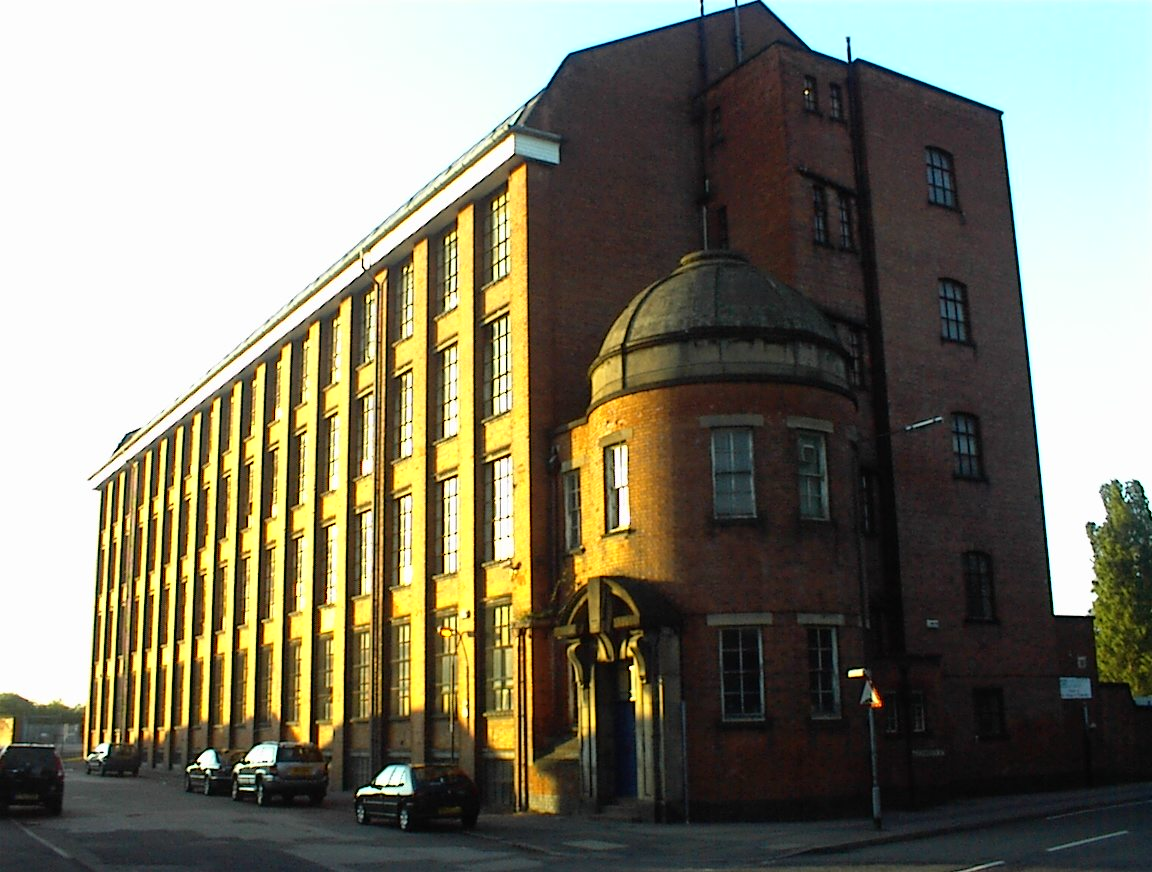
The former Britannia Mill

There were more than twelve probable water mills sites along the course of the brook, some of them mentioned in the Domesday Book when Derby was listed with having ten mills. Nearly all of them have been lost or demolished, although the mill at Mercaston survives as a private house, and Britannia mill is now part of The University of Derby.

Nun's mill was another site recorded in Derby, and mentioned as one of the goals in the description of the mob football game that took place in Derby until the 18th century.

== Floods ==
Due to its location beside the confluence of the River Derwent and the Markeaton brook, Derby has a long history of being flooded from either the brook or the river. In the 19th century Glover collated information on many of the earlier floods in his ‘History of the County of Derby’. Those that referred to the Markeaton Brook extended back to 1610, when three prisoners in the original Derby gaol were drowned. The gaol or jail was located near the Cornmarket, and had underground cells beneath street level, that filled with floodwaters, "owing to a sudden rise" of the brook.

St Werburgh's Church, Derby which is located next to the brook, suffered greatly from flood damage, such as in 1673, when "A great flood upon the Markeaton brook, carried away the hay, filled cellars as high as the Angel, Rotten Row, and broke down three of the ten bridges”, again in 1677 and in November 1698 “A great flood which washed down part of St. Werburgh’s church and the steeple fell." The church faced further floods in the 18th and 19th centuries.

In December 1740 there was; "A great flood in Derby. On Tuesday last, we had the greatest inundation of water here that ever was known, occasioned by the falling of a great quantity of snow and rain, which began on Sunday, and continued (almost without intermission) till Tuesday morning, at which time several streets, and all the rooms upon the ground floor were laid a great depth under water. Great damage was done to the houses and furniture; several walls were thrown down; bridges and great quantities of wood carried away, and numbers of cattle swept from pastures perished. The parish church of St. Werburgh received considerable damage, it having made so great a breach in the pavement throughout the church so as to require it to be new paved."

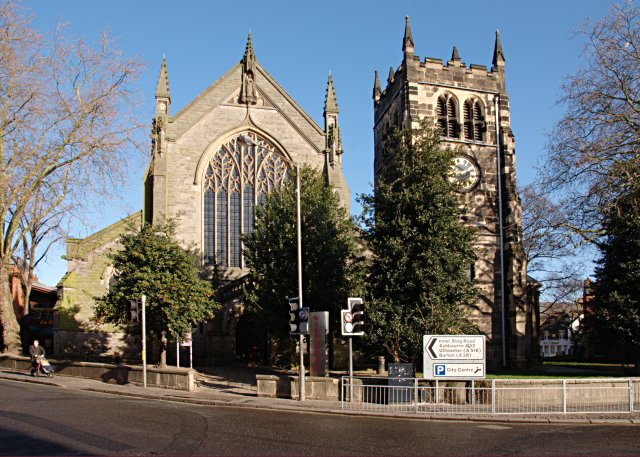
The former St Werburgh's Church and Tower

Repairs to the paving in the church were also required after the largest flood in the 19th century in April 1842. Herbert Spencer, who was an engineer in Derby at that time, described the flood: "A tributary of the river Derwent which runs through Derby, called the Markeaton Brook, was raised suddenly to an immense height by a local deluge of rain, and overflowed to the extent of producing in the main street a flood of some six feet in depth: the level attained being so unusual that it was marked by an iron plate let into the wall. It occurred to me to write a report on this flood; and to make suggestions for the prevention of any like catastrophe hereafter. This report was presented to the Town Council, and afterwards printed and distributed by their order."

The iron flood mark from 1842 still exists on the Wardwick Tavern. Glover noted that the flood level in the Wardwick as “4ft 3in” with the greatest depth of the flood being recorded in Willow row at “6 ft”.Losses due to the floods was estimated at £15,000 (equivalent to £1,466,525 as of 2025).

In the early 1930s there were two major floods caused by the brook, which provided the impetus to find a solution, and prevent further flooding in Derby. The first was in September 1931 when heavy rain across Derbyshire, caused substantial flooding from the brook in the centre of the town. Residents living alongside the course of the brook were trapped in their houses, and produce from nearby allotments was uprooted and swept through the streets.

The second flood occurred less than a year later in May 1932; again intense rainfall caused the brook to overflow, with considerable flooding throughout the central shopping quarter. A contemporary account recalls that; "Water poured into the streets and many houses were filled to a depth of six or seven feet. In the low-lying parts of the town it gathered quickly and, by ten o’clock on this memorable Sunday morning, shops in the Cornmarket, St James’s Street and the bottom end of St Peter’s Street were immersed half-way up the windows. The centre of town presented the appearance of a lake and the sight was unforgettable."

Following the flood, the Mayor of Derby set up a flood fund and a souvenir booklet costing 6d, was produced by the YMCA to raise money for those who houses and businesses had been affected. Damage to the town was estimated at £400,000. (equivalent to £24,140,328 as of 2025).

== Flood relief culverts ==
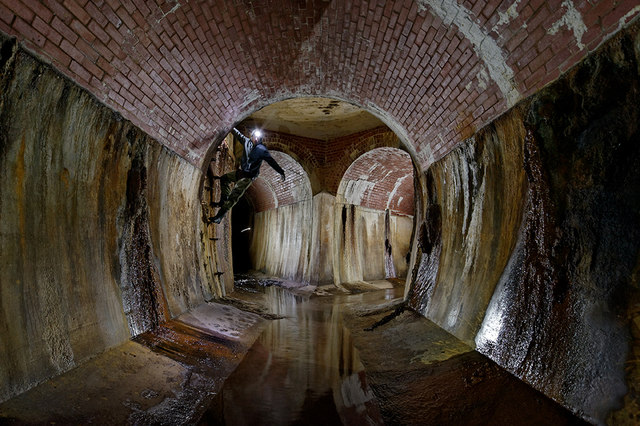
Northern Flood Relief Culvert showing the intersection of the tunnels from the Markeaton and Mackworth brooks

Following the floods of 1931 and 1932, the Borough council arranged for an investigation to be carried out into the flooding problem within the catchment. The planned solution was the construction of two flood relief culverts, with associated improvements to the sewerage system. Opened in 1938, the largest of the diversion tunnels was called the Northern Flood Relief Culvert, and drains excess flows from the Markeaton and Mackworth brooks. The second, known as the Bramble brook culvert takes surplus flows for that tributary stream.

The northern relief culvert commences at Markeaton Park, near to the confluence of the Markeaton and Mackworth brooks. Each brook has its own inlet spillway, with a weir that overflows during periods of high flows. Flows from these inlets converge, and are then taken by the relief culvert eastwards for 2.2 km through the suburbs of Derby, to an outfall with the Derwent in Darley Park.

In 2006, the inlet works were improved and upgraded to cope with changes in the catchment that have occurred since the original design.

== Wildlife and ecology ==
The brook and its tributaries supports a range of flora and fauna, and includes two protected areas of ecological importance at Muggington Bottoms and Kedleston Hall. Rare freshwater sponges, and the endangered native white clawed crayfish have been found in the brook.

== Projects and groups ==
Since 2004, the catchments of the Mercaston & Markeaton brooks have been included in a multi-agency project designed to reduce sediment runoff in the catchment, restore hedgerows, and tackle invasive species such as American mink and Himalayan balsam. Taking part in the project are the Friends of the Markeaton Brook, an advocate group which aims to protect the brook and its surroundings, and educate the public on its history, amenities and nature.

== Bibliography ==
- Farnsworth, Don (2008). The Story of the Markeaton Brook (PDF). Derby Heritage Forum.
