= Derbyshire North =

- Proposed unitary authority area
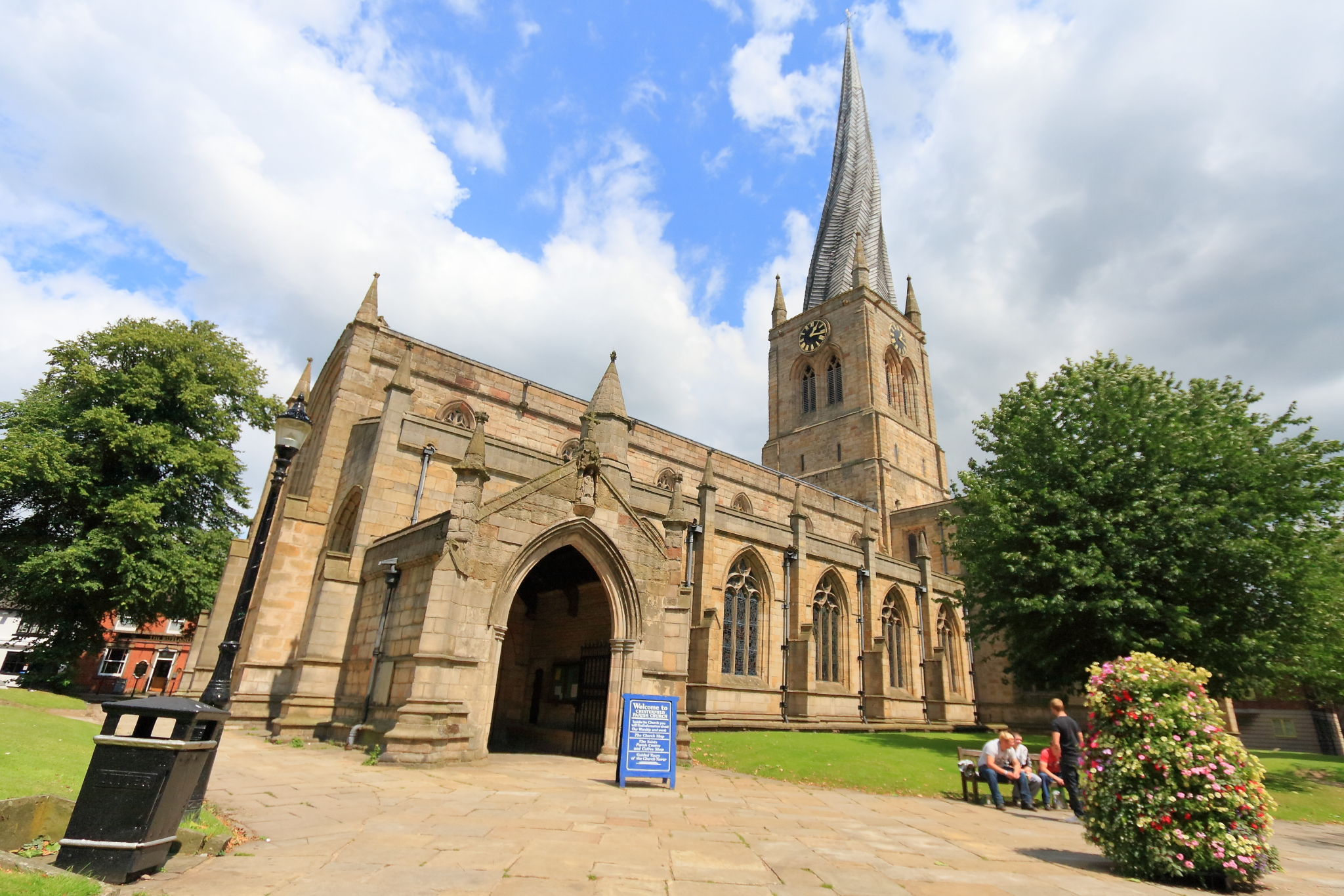
- Chesterfield Parish Church

- Derbyshire North shown within Derbyshire
- Interactive map
- Coordinates: 53.2367°N 1.4323°W
- Sovereign state: United Kingdom
- Country: England
- Region: East Midlands
- Ceremonial county: Derbyshire

Government
  - Type: Unitary authority
  - Body: Derbyshire North Council

Area
  - Total: 777 sq mi (2,012 km^{2})

Population (2024 estimate)
  - Total: 545,201
- Time zone: UTC+0 (GMT)
  - Summer (DST): UTC+1 (BST)

Derbyshire North or Northern Derbyshire was a proposed unitary authority area in the ceremonial county of Derbyshire, England. It was planned to be formed on 1 April 2028. The largest settlement would be Chesterfield, and it would also include Ashbourne, Bakewell, Bolsover, Buxton, Chapel-en-le-Frith, Clay Cross, Darley Dale, Dronfield, Glossop, Matlock, New Mills, Whaley Bridge Wirksworth. It would cover the majority of the Peak District National Park. The area has a population of 538,763. Plans to create it were halted in September 2026 and the first election was cancelled. In October 2026, plans to create it were withdrawn.

== Formation ==
It was planned to be formed from the Bolsover, Chesterfield, Derbyshire Dales, High Peak and North East Derbyshire plus 21 parishes from Amber Valley district. The rest of Derbyshire, including the area around Derby itself was to form form part of the Derbyshire South unitary.

The district was being formed as part of ongoing local government changes throughout England, in which all areas of the country that have separate county councils and district councils will see those replaced with single-tier, or unitary, local governance. The proposal was backed by Chesterfield, Derby, Erewash and High Peak Councils. The three alternative proposals for a different split between northern and southern unitaries in Derbyshire, and Derbyshire County Council's proposal for a single unitary for the county, including Derby, were not accepted.

In September 2026, the Derbyshire proposals were halted by the government and placed under review. In October 2026, plans to create it were withdrawn. The decision was threatened with judicial review by Amber Valley Borough Council.

== Parishes ==
Buxton, Chesterfield, Glossop and the Riddings area are currently unparished, the rest of the area is parished. The parishes coming from Amber Valley would have been: Aldercar and Langley Mill, Alderwasley, Alfreton, Ashleyhay, Codnor, Crich, Dethick, Lea and Holloway, Hazelwood, Heanor and Loscoe, Idridgehay and Alton, Ironville, Pentrich, Ravensdale Park, Ripley, Shottle and Postern, Somercotes, South Wingfield, Swanwick, Turnditch, Weston Underwood and Windley.

== Governance ==
It was to be run by Derbyshire North Council, which would comprise 83 councillors.
