= Listed buildings in Shottle and Postern =

Shottle and Postern is a civil parish in the Amber Valley district of Derbyshire, England. The parish contains six listed buildings that are recorded in the National Heritage List for England. All the listed buildings are designated at Grade II, the lowest of the three grades, which is applied to "buildings of national importance and special interest". The parish contains the villages of Cowers Lane, Shottle and Shottlegate, but is otherwise rural, and the listed buildings consist of four farmhouses and two mileposts.

== Buildings ==
Name and location	Photograph	Date	Notes
Crowtrees Farmhouse; 53.05097°N 1.52378°W	—	Late 18th century	The farmhouse is in gritstone, and has a tile roof with coped gables and moulded kneelers. There are two storeys, a double pile plan, three bays, and a single-storey extension recessed at the west end. The central doorway has a plain surround, and the windows are mullioned, all with hood moulds.
Handley Farmhouse and outbuilding 53.04180°N 1.51934°W	—	c. 1800	The farmhouse is in gritstone with an eaves band and a tile roof. The house has two storeys and attics, and two bays, and the outbuilding extends from the rear to the west. On the house is a flat-roofed porch with moulded pilasters, a lintel and a cornice, and sash windows with rusticated wedge lintels. The rear range has a two-light mullioned window, and a blocked doorway with a quoined surround.
Carrbrook Farmhouse and outbuilding 53.03880°N 1.54686°W		Early 19th century	The rebuilding of an earlier farmhouse, retaining an 18th-century wing, it is in gritstone and has a hipped Welsh slate roof. There are two storeys, a double depth plan, and a south front of three bays. In the centre is an ornamental cast iron porch with pierced spandrels to the archway, and the windows are sashes. The outbuilding to the north contains casement windows, and at the north end is a stable doorway with a massive quoined surround, and a two-light mullioned window.
Milepost (north); 53.02673°N 1.56069°W		Early 19th century	The milepost on the southwest side of Wirksworth Road (B5023 road) is in cast iron. It has a triangular plan, rising to a back plate with a segmental top., and is inscribed at the top with "Shottle", and below with the distances to London, Wirksworth and Derby.
Milepost (south); 53.01773°N 1.54293°W		Early 19th century	The milepost on the southwest side of Wirksworth Road (B5023 road) is in cast iron. It has a triangular plan, rising to a back plate with a segmental top., and is inscribed at the top with "Shottle", and below with the distances to London, Wirksworth and Derby.
Shottlegate Farmhouse; 53.02257°N 1.52200°W		1855	The farmhouse is in gritstone, with quoins, coved eaves and a band, and a hipped slate roof with coped gables and moulded kneelers. There are two storeys, a front of three bays, the middle bay projecting and gabled, and two parallel rear wings. In the centre is an open porch with fluted octagonal columns, an entablature and a cornice, and a doorway with a chamfered surround and a shallow arched head. Over the porch is a mullioned and transomed window, and above it is a smaller window with a dated lintel. The porch is flanked by canted bay windows, and in both floors are mullioned and transomed windows. The rear wings contain two-light mullioned windows.
