= Morley Park =

Coordinates: 53.0384°N 1.4359°W

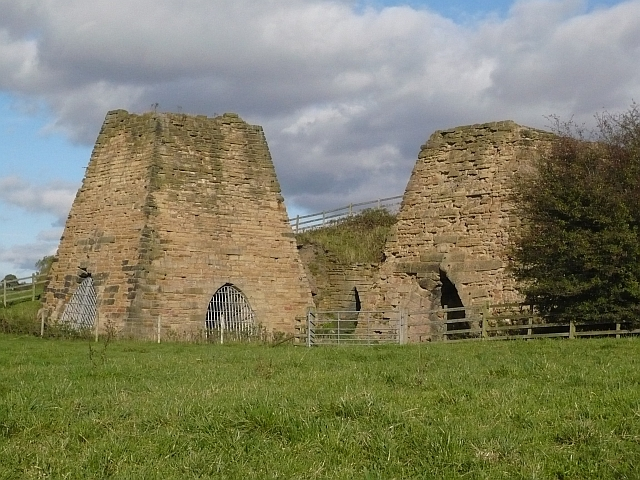
- Iron smelting furnaces

- Location within Derbyshire
- District: Amber Valley
- Shire county: Derbyshire
- Region: East Midlands
- Country: England
- Sovereign state: United Kingdom
- Post town: RIPLEY
- Postcode district: DE5
- Police: Derbyshire
- Fire: Derbyshire
- Ambulance: East Midlands

Morley Park is an area within Heage, in the parish of Ripley in the English county of Derbyshire, north of Derby. It is about five miles north of the village of Morley itself.

At the Norman Conquest it was within the wapentake of Morleyston. In the reign of Henry II it was within the newly created Forest of East Derbyshire.

When the area was disafforested in 1225, it may have been taken over when William de Ferrers, 4th Earl of Derby extended Duffield Frith to include the manor of Bradley, now part of Belper. In 1266 the area became part of the Duchy of Lancaster.

It was an enclosed area, one of the seven royal parks within the Frith. Adjacent to it was the smaller Belper or Lady Park.

In the nineteenth century Morley Park was the site of iron smelting furnaces, some of which have been preserved and can be seen from the A38 road.
