= Royal forest =

Areas of land in the British Isles

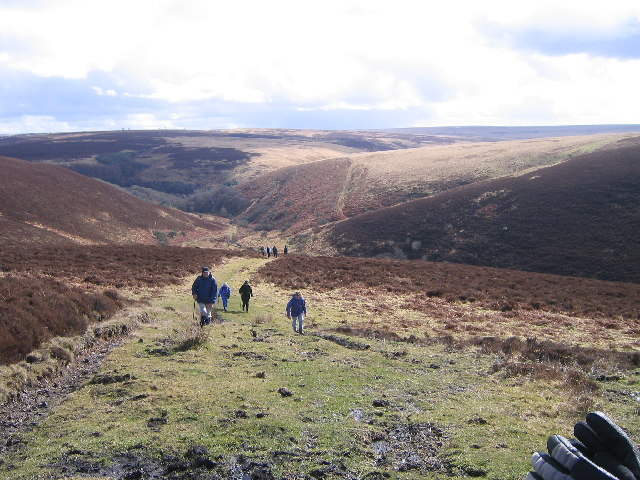
The royal forest of Exmoor in Devon. Royal forests do not necessarily include woodland.

A royal forest, occasionally known as a kingswood (Latin: silva regis), is an area of land with different definitions in England, Wales, Scotland and Ireland. The term forest in the ordinary modern understanding refers to an area of wooded land; however, the original medieval sense was closer to the modern idea of a "preserve" – i.e. land legally set aside for specific purposes such as royal hunting – with less emphasis on its composition. There are also differing and contextual interpretations in Continental Europe derived from the Carolingian and Merovingian legal systems.

In Anglo-Saxon England, though the kings were great huntsmen, they never set aside areas declared to be "outside" (Latin foris) the law of the land. Historians find no evidence of the Anglo-Saxon monarchs (c. 500 to 1066) creating forests. However, under the Norman kings (after 1066), by royal prerogative forest law was widely applied. The law was designed to protect the "venison and the vert". In this sense, venison meant "noble" animals of the chase – notably red and fallow deer, the roe deer, and wild boar – and vert meant the greenery that sustained them. Forests were designed as hunting areas reserved for the monarch or (by invitation) the aristocracy. The concept was introduced by the Normans to England in the 11th century, and at the height of this practice in the late 12th and early 13th centuries, fully one-third of the land area of Southern England was designated as royal forest. At one stage in the 12th century, all of Essex was afforested. On accession Henry II declared all of Huntingdonshire to be a royal forest.

Afforestation, in particular the creation of the New Forest, figured large in the folk history of the "Norman yoke", which magnified what was already a grave social ill:

The picture of prosperous settlements disrupted, houses burned, peasants evicted, all to serve the pleasure of the foreign tyrant, is a familiar element in the English national story .... The extent and intensity of hardship and of depopulation have been exaggerated.

— H. R. Loyn

Forest law prescribed harsh punishment for anyone who committed any of a range of offences within the forests; by the mid-17th century, enforcement of this law had died out, but many of England's woodlands still bore the title "Royal Forest". During the Middle Ages, the practice of reserving areas of land for the sole use of the aristocracy was common throughout Europe.

Royal forests usually included large areas of heath, grassland and wetland – anywhere that supported deer and other game. In addition, when an area was initially designated forest, any villages, towns and fields that lay within it were also subject to forest law. This could foster resentment as the local inhabitants were then restricted in the use of land they had previously relied upon for their livelihoods; however, common rights were not extinguished, but merely curtailed.

== Areas chosen for royal forests ==
The areas that became royal forests were already relatively wild and sparsely populated, and can be related to specific geographic features that made them harder to work as farmland.

In the South West of England, forests extended across the Upper Jurassic Clay Vale. In the Midlands, the clay plain surrounding the River Severn was heavily wooded. Clay soils in Oxfordshire, Buckinghamshire, Huntingdonshire and Northamptonshire formed another belt of woodlands. In Hampshire, Berkshire and Surrey, woodlands were established on sandy, gravelly, acid soils. In the Scots Highlands, a "deer forest" generally has no trees at all.

Marshlands in Lincolnshire were afforested. Upland moors too were chosen, such as Dartmoor and Exmoor in the South West, and the Peak Forest of Derbyshire. The North Yorkshire moors, a sandstone plateau, had a number of royal forests.

== Forest law ==
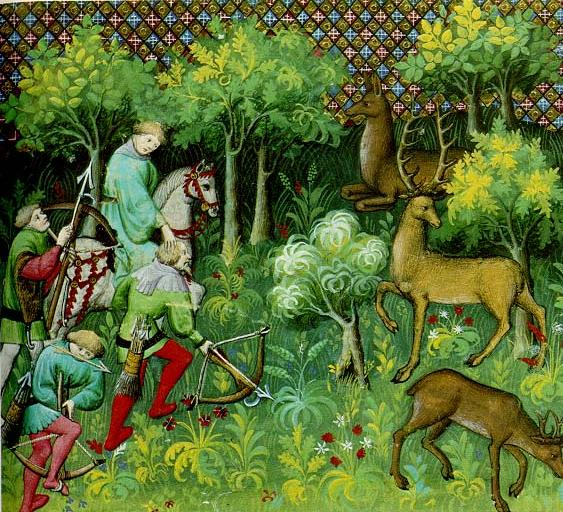
Medieval forest scene, from the Livre de chasse (1387)

William the Conqueror, a great lover of hunting, established the system of forest law. This operated outside the common law, and served to protect game animals and their forest habitat from destruction. In the year of his death, 1087, a poem, "The Rime of King William", inserted in the Peterborough Chronicle, expresses English indignation at the forest laws.

=== Offences ===
Offences in forest law were divided into two categories: trespass against the vert (the vegetation of the forest) and trespass against the venison (the game).

The five animals of the forest protected by law were given by Manwood as the hart and hind (i.e. male and female red deer), boar, hare and wolf. (In England, the boar became extinct in the wild by the 13th century, and the wolf by the late 15th century.) Protection was also said to be extended to the beasts of chase, namely the buck and doe (fallow deer), fox, marten, and roe deer, and the beasts and fowls of warren: the hare, coney, pheasant, and partridge. In addition, inhabitants of the forest were forbidden to bear hunting weapons, and dogs were banned from the forest; mastiffs were permitted as watchdogs, but they had to have their front claws removed to prevent them from hunting game. The rights of chase and of warren (i.e. to hunt such beasts) were often granted to local nobility for a fee, but were a separate concept.

Trespasses against the vert were extensive: they included purpresture, assarting, clearing forest land for agriculture, and felling trees or clearing shrubs, among others. These laws applied to any land within the boundary of the forest, even if it were freely owned; although the Charter of the Forest in 1217 established that all freemen owning land within the forest enjoyed the rights of agistment and pannage. Under the forest laws, bloody hand was a kind of trespass by which the offender, being apprehended and found with his hands or other body part stained with blood, is judged to have killed the deer, even though he was not found hunting or chasing.

Disafforested lands on the edge of the forest were known as purlieus; agriculture was permitted here and deer escaping from the forest into them were permitted to be killed if causing damage.

=== Rights and privileges ===
Payment for access to certain rights could provide a useful source of income. Local nobles could be granted a royal licence to take a certain amount of game. The common inhabitants of the forest might, depending on their location, possess a variety of rights: estover, the right of taking firewood; pannage, the right to pasture swine in the forest; turbary, the right to cut turf (as fuel); and various other rights of pasturage (agistment) and harvesting the products of the forest. Land might be disafforested entirely, or permission given for assart and purpresture.

=== Officers ===
The justices of the forest were the justices in eyre and the verderers.

The chief royal official was the warden. As he was often an eminent and preoccupied magnate, his powers were frequently exercised by a deputy. He supervised the foresters and under-foresters, who personally went about preserving the forest and game and apprehending offenders against the law. The agisters supervised pannage and agistment and collected any fees thereto appertaining. The nomenclature of the officers can be somewhat confusing: the rank immediately below the constable was referred to as foresters-in-fee, or, later, woodwards, who held land in the forest in exchange for rent, and advised the warden. They exercised various privileges within their bailiwicks. Their subordinates were the under-foresters, later referred to as rangers. The rangers are sometimes said to be patrollers of the purlieu.

Another group, called serjeants-in-fee, and later, foresters-in-fee (not to be confused with the above), held small estates in return for their service in patrolling the forest and apprehending offenders.

The forests also had surveyors, who determined the boundaries of the forest, and regarders. These last reported to the court of justice-seat and investigated encroachments on the forest and invasion of royal rights, such as assarting. While their visits were infrequent, due to the interval of time between courts, they provided a check against collusion between the foresters and local offenders.

=== Courts ===
Blackstone gives the following outline of the forest courts, as theoretically constructed:

- Court of attachment, sometimes called the Forty-Day Court or Woodmote. This court was held every forty days, and was presided over by verderers and the Warden, or his deputy. The foresters attached persons who had committed crimes against the forest law and brought them before this court to have them enrolled; however, it did not possess the power to try or convict individuals, and such cases had to be passed upwards to the swainmote or the court of justice seat.
- Court of regard, held every third year to enforce the law requiring declawing of dogs within the forest.
- Swainmote or Sweinmote was held three times a year: the fortnight before the feast of St. Michael, about the feast of St. Martin, and the fortnight before the feast of St. John the Baptist. It was presided over by the Warden and verderers, the foresters and agisters being in attendance. The first two occasions were to regulate agistment and pannage, respectively; the third was for the purpose of trying offenders before a jury of swains, or freemen of the forest. The name of the court is sometimes said to be derived from swine, probably a misapprehension through its regulation of pannage.
- Court of justice-seat or eyre was the highest of the forest courts. It was to be held every three years, to be announced forty days in advance, and was presided over by a justice in eyre. It was, in theory, the only court that could pass sentence upon offenders of the forest laws.

In practice, these fine distinctions were not always observed. In the Forest of Dean, swainmote and the court of attachment seem to have been one and the same throughout most of its history. As the courts of justice-seat were held less frequently, the lower courts assumed the power to fine offenders against the forest laws, according to a fixed schedule. The courts of justice-seat crept into disuse, and in 1817, the office of justice in eyre was abolished and its powers transferred to the First Commissioner of Woods and Forests. Courts of swainmote and attachment went out of existence at various dates in the different forests. A Court of Swainmote was re-established in the New Forest in 1877.

== History ==
Since the Norman Conquest of England, the forest, chase and warren lands had been exempted from the common law and subject only to the authority of the king, but these customs had faded into obscurity by the time of The Restoration.

=== William the Conqueror ===
William I, original enactor of the Forest Law in England, did not harshly penalise offenders. The accusation that he "laid a law upon it, that whoever slew hart or hind should be blinded," according to the Anglo-Saxon Chronicle is little more than propaganda. William Rufus, also a keen hunter, increased the severity of the penalties for various offences to include death and mutilation. The laws were in part codified under the Assize of the Forest (1184) of Henry II.

=== Magna Carta ===
Magna Carta, the charter forced upon King John of England by the English barons in 1215, contained five clauses relating to royal forests. They aimed to limit, and even reduce, the King's sole rights as enshrined in forest law:

- (44) People who live outside the forest need not in future appear before the Royal Justices of the Forest in answer to general summonses, unless they are actually involved in proceedings or are sureties for someone who has been seized for a forest offence.
- (47) All forests that have been created in our reign shall at once be disafforested. River-banks that have been enclosed in our reign shall be treated similarly.
- (48) All evil customs relating to forests and warrens, foresters, warreners, sheriffs and their servants, or river-banks and their wardens, are at once to be investigated in every county by twelve sworn knights of the county, and within forty days of their enquiry the evil customs are to be abolished completely and irrevocably. But we, or our chief justice if we are not in England, are first to be informed.
- (52) To any man whom we have deprived or dispossessed of lands, castles, liberties, or rights, without the lawful judgement of his equals, we will at once restore these. In cases of dispute the matter shall be resolved by the judgement of the twenty-five barons referred to below in the clause for securing the peace (§ 61). In cases, however, where a man was deprived or dispossessed of something without the lawful judgement of his equals by our father King Henry or our brother King Richard, and it remains in our hands or is held by others under our warranty, we shall have respite for the period commonly allowed to Crusaders, unless a lawsuit had been begun, or an enquiry had been made at our order, before we took the Cross as a Crusader. On our return from the Crusade, or if we abandon it, we will at once render justice in full.
- (53) We shall have similar respite [to that in clause 52] in rendering justice in connexion with forests that are to be disafforested, or to remain forests, when these were first afforested by our father Henry or our brother Richard; with the guardianship of lands in another person's 'fee', when we have hitherto had this by virtue of a 'fee' held of us for knight's service by a third party; and with abbeys founded in another person's 'fee', in which the lord of the 'fee' claims to own a right. On our return from the Crusade, or if we abandon it, we will at once do full justice to complaints about these matters.

=== Charter of the Forest ===
After the death of John, Henry III was compelled to grant the Charter of the Forest (1217), which further reformed the forest law and established the rights of agistment and pannage on private land within the forests. It also checked certain of the extortions of the foresters. An "Ordinance of the Forest" under Edward I again checked the oppression of the officers and introduced sworn juries in the forest courts.

=== Great Perambulation and after ===
In 1300 many (if not all) forests were perambulated and reduced greatly in their extent, in theory to their extent in the time of Henry II. However, this depended on the determination of local juries, whose decisions often excluded from the Forest lands described in Domesday Book as within the forest. Successive kings tried to recover the "purlieus" excluded from a forest by the Great Perambulation of 1300. Forest officers periodically fined the inhabitants of the purlieus for failing to attend Forest Court or for forest offences. This led to complaints in Parliament. The king promised to remedy the grievances, but usually did nothing.

Several forests were alienated by Richard II and his successors, but generally the system decayed. Henry VII revived "Swainmotes" (forest courts) for several forests and held Forest Eyres in some of them. Henry VIII in 1547 placed the forests under the Court of Augmentations with two Masters and two Surveyors-General. On the abolition of that court, the two surveyors-general became responsible to the Exchequer. Their respective divisions were north and south of the River Trent.

The last serious exercise of forest law by a court of justice-seat (Forest Eyre) seems to have been in about 1635, in an attempt to raise money.

=== Disafforestation, sale of forest lands and the Western Rising ===
By the Tudor period and after, forest law had largely become anachronistic, and served primarily to protect timber in the royal forests. James I and his ministers Robert Cecil and Lionel Cranfield pursued a policy of increasing revenues from the forests and starting the process of disafforestation.

Cecil made the first steps towards abolition of the forests, as part of James I's policy of increasing his income independently of Parliament. Cecil investigated forests that were unused for royal hunting and provided little revenue from timber sales. Knaresborough Forest in Yorkshire was abolished. Revenues in the Forest of Dean were increased through sales of wood for iron smelting. Enclosures were made in Chippenham and Blackmore for herbage and pannage.

Cranfield commissioned surveys into assart lands of various forests, including Feckenham, Sedgemoor and Selwood, laying the foundations of the wide-scale abolition of forests under Charles I. The commissioners appointed raised over £25,000 by compounding with occupiers, whose ownership was confirmed, subject to a fixed rent. Cranfield's work led directly to the disafforestation of Gillingham Forest in Dorset and Chippenham and Blackmore in Wiltshire. Additionally, he created the model for the abolition of the forests followed throughout the 1630s.

Each disafforestation would start with a commission from the Exchequer, which would survey the forest, determine the lands belonging to the crown, and negotiate compensation for landowners and tenants whose now-traditional rights to use of the land as commons would be revoked. A legal action by the Attorney General would then proceed in the Court of Exchequer against the forest residents for intrusion, which would confirm the settlement negotiated by the commission. Crown lands would then be granted (leased), usually to prominent courtiers, and often the same figures that had undertaken the commission surveys. Legal complaints about the imposed settlements and compensation were frequent.

The disafforestations caused riots and Skimmington processions resulting in the destruction of enclosures and reoccupation of grazing lands in a number of West Country forests, including Gillingham, Braydon and Dean, known as the Western Rising. Riots also took place in Feckenham, Leicester and Malvern. The riots followed the physical enclosure of lands previously used as commons, and frequently led to the destruction of fencing and hedges. Some were said to have had a "warlike" character, with armed mobs numbering hundreds, for instance in Feckenham. The rioters in Dean fully destroyed the enclosures surrounding 3,000 acres in groups that numbered thousands of participants.

The disturbances tended to involve artisans and cottagers who were not entitled to compensation. The riots were hard to enforce against, due to the lack of efficient militia, and the low-born nature of the participants. Ultimately, however, enclosure succeeded, with the exceptions of Dean and Malvern Chase.

Delimitation of Forests Act 1640 (Note: The citation of this act by this short title was authorised by section 5 of, and the second schedule to, the Statute Law Revision Act 1948. Due to the repeal of those provisions, it is now authorised by section 19(2) of the Interpretation Act 1978.)
- Act of Parliament
- Parliament of England
- Long title: An Act for the caertainty of Forrests and of the Meers Meets Limits & Bounds of the Forrests. (Note: These words are printed against this act in the second column of the second schedule to the Statute Law Revision Act 1948, which is headed "Title".)
- Citation: 16 Cha. 1. c. 16
- Territorial extent: England and Wales

Dates
- Royal assent: 7 August 1641
- Commencement: 3 November 1640 (Note: Start of session.)
- Repealed: 1 July 1971 (Note: The whole act was repealed by section 1(4) of, and the schedule to, the Wild Creatures and Forest Laws Act 1971, which took effect on the date of its royal assent.)
Other legislation
Repealed by	Wild Creatures and Forest Laws Act 1971

Status: Repealed

Text of statute as originally enacted

In 1641, Parliament passed the Delimitation of Forests Act 1640 (16 Cha. 1. c. 16), also known as Selden's Act, to revert the forest boundaries to the positions they had held at the end of the reign of James I.

=== After the Restoration ===
The Forest of Dean was legally re-established in 1668 by the Dean Forest Act 1667. A Forest Eyre was held for the New Forest in 1670, and a few for other forests in the 1660s and 1670s, but these were the last. From 1715, both surveyors' posts (covering England north and south of the Trent respectively) were held by the same person. The remaining royal forests continued to be managed (in theory, at least) on behalf of the Crown. However, the commoners' rights of grazing often seem to have been more important than the rights of the Crown.

In the late 1780s, a royal commission was appointed to inquire into which Crown woods were surviving, and their condition. It found only one north of the Trent, Sherwood Forest. South of the Trent, it found the New Forest, three others in Hampshire, Windsor Forest in Berkshire, the Forest of Dean in Gloucestershire, Waltham or Epping Forest in Essex, three forests in Northamptonshire, and Wychwood in Oxfordshire. Some of these no longer had swainmote courts, and thus had no official supervision. The commission divided the remaining forests into two classes, those with the Crown as major landowner, and those without. In certain Hampshire forests and in the Forest of Dean most of the soil belonged to the Crown, and these became reserved to grow timber to meet the need for oak for shipbuilding. The others would be enclosed, the Crown receiving an "allotment" (compensation) in lieu of its rights.

In 1810, responsibility for woods was moved from Surveyors-General (who accounted to the Auditors of Land Revenue) to a new Commission of Woods, Forests, and Land Revenues. In 1832 "Works and Buildings" were added to their responsibilities, but removed in 1851. In 1924, the royal forests were transferred to the new Forestry Commission (later to become Forestry England).

== Surviving ancient forests ==
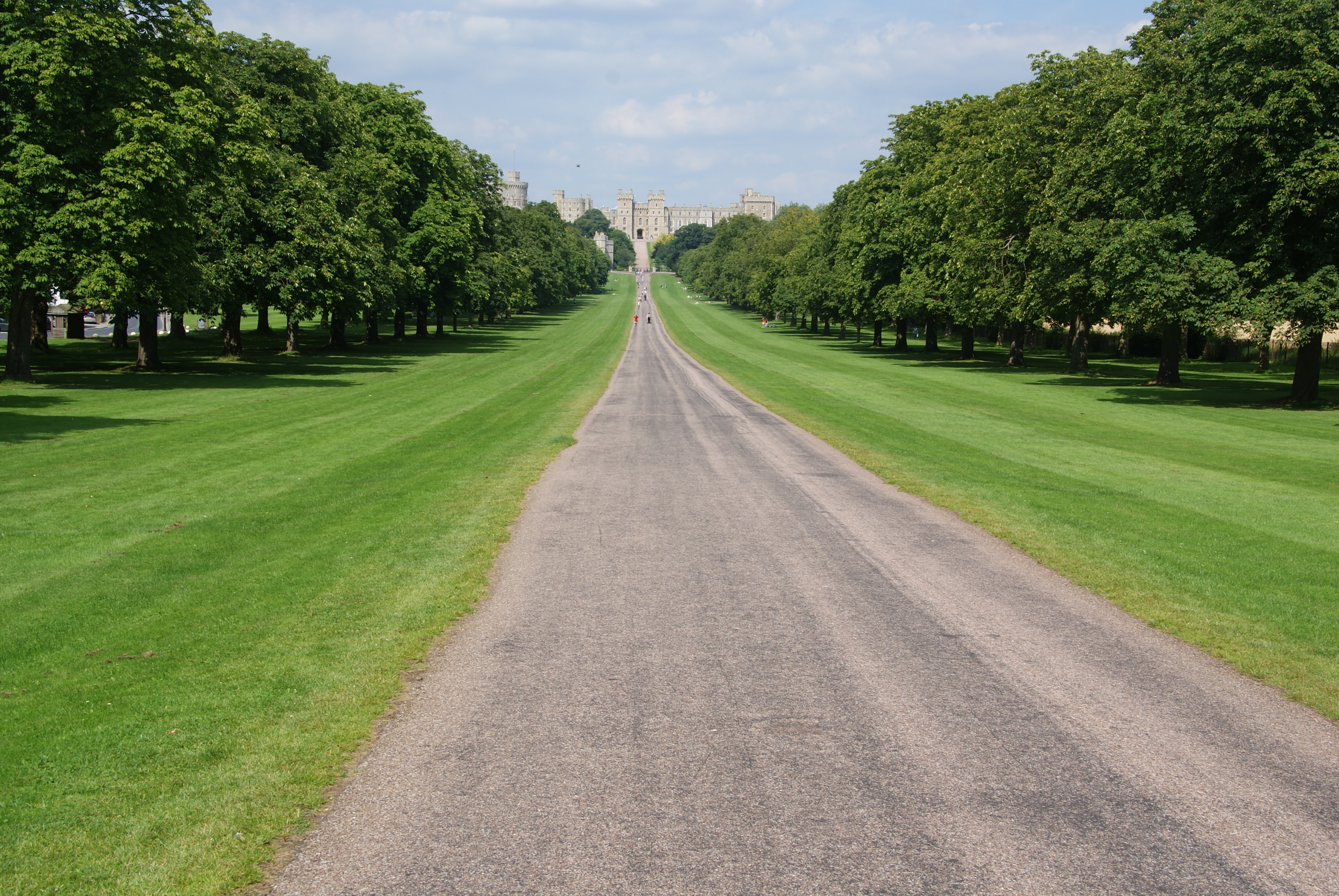
The Long Walk to Windsor Castle, Windsor Forest

=== Forest of Dean ===
The Forest of Dean was used as a source of charcoal for ironmaking within the Forest from 1612 until about 1670. It was the subject of a Reafforestation Act in 1667. Courts continued to be held at the Speech House, for example, to regulate the activities of the Freeminers. The sale of cordwood for charcoal continued until at least the late 18th century. Deer were removed in 1850. The forest is today heavily wooded, as is a substantial formerly privately owned area to the west, now treated as part of the forest. It is managed by Forestry England.

=== Epping and Hainault Forests ===
Epping and Hainault Forest are surviving remnants of the Royal Forest of Waltham. The extent of Epping and Hainault Forests was greatly reduced by inclosure by landowners. The Hainault Forest Act 1851 (14 & 15 Vict. c. 43) was passed by Parliament, ending the royal protection for Hainault Forest. Within six weeks 3,000 acres of woodland was cleared. The Corporation of London wished to see Epping Forest preserved as an open space and obtained an injunction in 1874 to throw open some 3,000 acres (12 km^{2}) that had been enclosed in the preceding 20 years. In 1875 and 1876, the corporation bought 3,000 acres (12 km^{2}) of open wasteland. Under the Epping Forest Act 1878 (41 & 42 Vict. c. ccxiii), the forest was disafforested and forest law was abolished in respect of it. Instead, the corporation was appointed as Conservators of the Forest. The forest is managed through the Epping Forest Committee.

=== New Forest ===
The New Forest is home to the British cultural minority known as New Forest Commoners. The New Forest Act 1851 (14 & 15 Vict. c. 76) was passed to remove the deer, but abandoned when it was realised that the deer were needed to keep open the unwooded "lawns" of the forest. An attempt was made to develop the forest for growing wood by a rolling programme of inclosures. In 1875, a select committee of the House of Commons recommended against this, leading to the passage of the New Forest Act 1877 (40 & 41 Vict. c. cxxi), which limited the Crown's right to enclose, regulated common rights, and reconstituted the Court of Verderers. A further act was passed, the New Forest Act 1964. This forest is also managed by Forestry England.

=== Sherwood Forest ===
A forest since the end of the Ice Age (as attested by pollen sampling cores), Sherwood Forest National Nature Reserve today encompasses 423.2 hectares, (1,045 acres) surrounding the Nottinghamshire village of Edwinstowe. The reserve has the highest concentration of ancient trees in Europe.

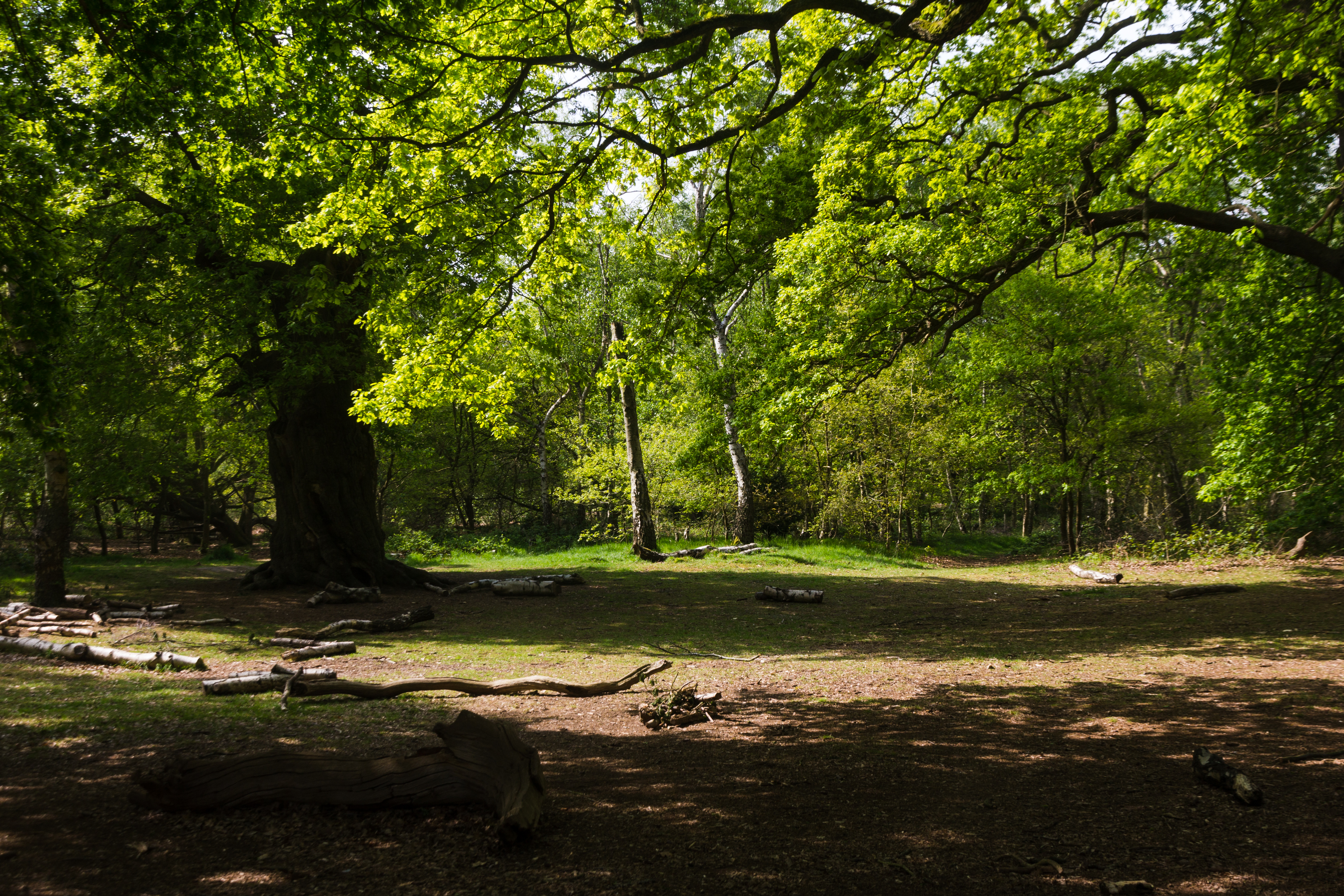
Sherwood Forest

It is a remnant of an older, much larger, royal hunting forest, which derived its name from its status as the shire (or sher) wood of Nottinghamshire, which extended into several neighbouring counties, bordered on the west along the River Erewash and the Forest of East Derbyshire. When the Domesday Book was compiled in 1086, the forest covered perhaps a quarter of Nottinghamshire in woodland and heath subject to the forest laws. Sherwood Forest has historic associations with Robin Hood.

A 1,250-acre (506 ha) fragment of the forest is designated as Birklands And Bilhaugh, a Site of Special Scientific Interest. This ancient oak-birch woodland is home to the Major Oak and has an exceptional diversity of invertebrate species associated with old trees and dead wood.

== Royal forests by county ==
=== England ===
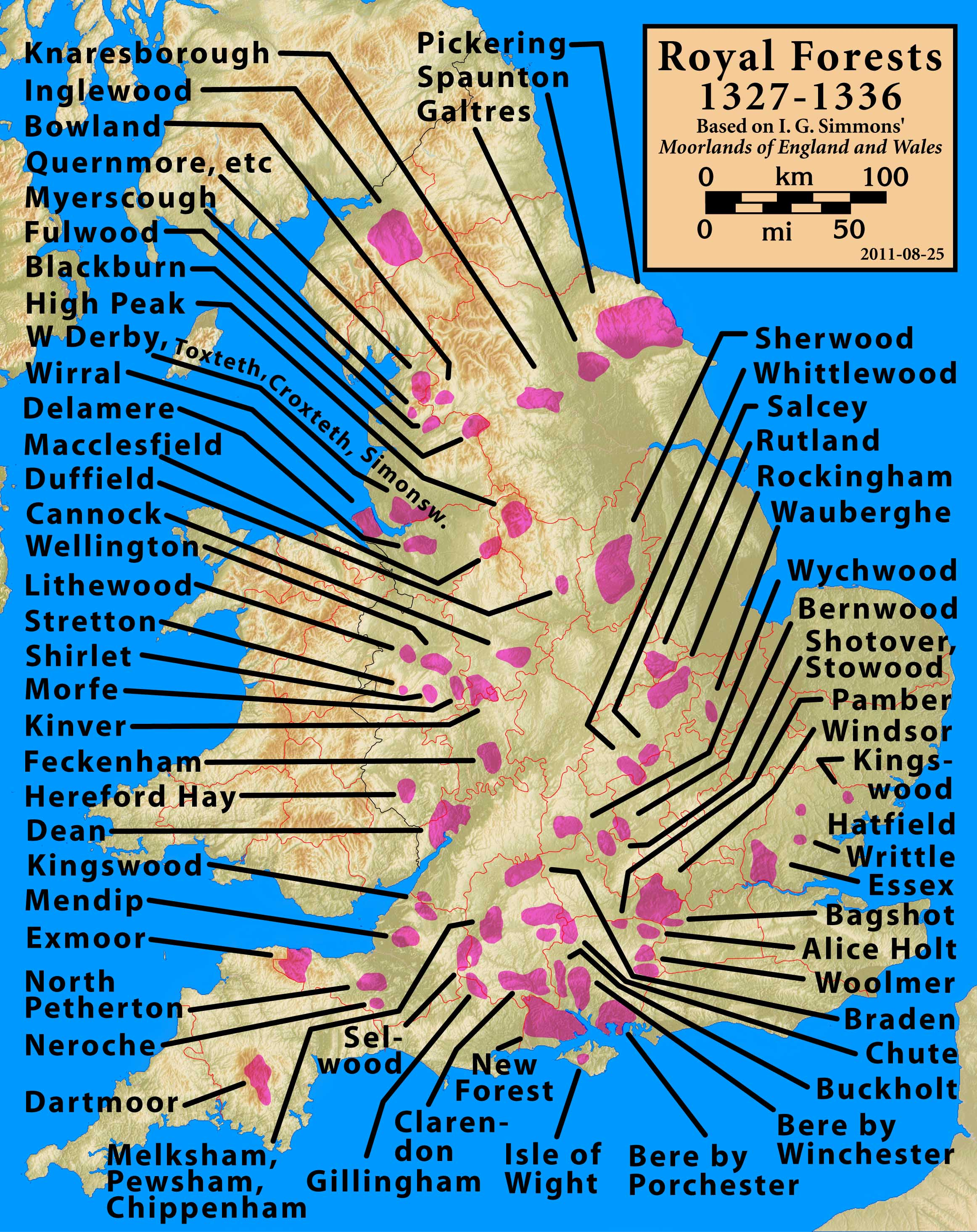

Name of forest	County	Disafforestation date	Notes	Soil or landscape
Aconbury	Herefordshire	1216, part	360 acres assarted to support a nunnery in 1216	
Accrington	Lancashire			
Alice Holt and Woolmer Forests	Hampshire	1812		Sandy, gravelly acid soils; dry oak, birch wood
Allerdale Forest	Cumberland			
Alnwick	Northumberland	1280		
Alveston	Gloucestershire			
Archenfield	Herefordshire	1251		
Ashurst	Sussex			
Bagshot	Surrey		Part of Windsor Forest	Sandy, gravelly acid soils; dry oak, birch wood
Becontree	Essex			
Bedfordshire	Bedfordshire	1191, Part disafforested		
Bere Forest including Bere Ashley	Hampshire and Dorset	1269, in Dorset		Sandy, gravelly acid soils; dry oak, birch wood
Bere Porchester	Hampshire	1810		Sandy, gravelly acid soils; dry oak, birch wood
Berkshire	Berkshire	1227		
Bernwood Forest	Buckinghamshire	1622	Including Brill and Panshill	Clay soils, woodlands
Bernwood Forest	Oxfordshire	1622	Partly in Bucks	Clay soils, woodlands
Blackmoor Forest	Dorset	1277		Heavy clay soils, dense oak forest
Blackmore	Wiltshire		Alias Melksham	
Bolsover Forest	Derbyshire			
Bowland	Lancashire and Yorkshire			
Braydon Forest or Forest of Braden	Wiltshire	1630	Included parish of Minety, at that time in Gloucestershire; disafforested with riots	Heavy clay soils, dense oak forest
Brewood Forest	Staffordshire or Shropshire	1204		
Brigstock	Northamptonshire	1638	Part of Rockingham Forest	
Brill	Buckinghamshire		Part of Bernwood Forest	
Burrington Forest	Somerset			
Carlisle	Cumberland		or Inglewood Forest	
Cannock Chase	Staffordshire	1290, in part	1290 partially given to the Bishop of Coventry and Lichfield for a Chase	
Charnwood Forest	Leicestershire			
Chelmsford	Essex			
Chippenham	Wiltshire	1618–23	Perhaps excepting Bowood or Pewsham New Park	Heavy clay soils, dense oak forest
Chute Forest	Hampshire and Wiltshire	1639–61	Included Finkley and Digerley Forests	
Cirencester	Gloucestershire		Possibly Braydon	
Clarendon Forest	Wiltshire	1664 (Clarendon)	Including Panchet Wood and Milchet Park, with the associated Forest of Buckholt, Hampshire	
Claverley and Worfield	Shropshire			
Cornbury	Oxfordshire		Or Wychwood	
Cornwall	Cornwall	1204	Two woods and two moors, disafforested 1215	
Dartmoor	Devon	1204	Annexed to Duchy of Cornwall 1337	High moorlands
Dean	Gloucestershire and Herefordshire			Midland clay plain, oak forest
Delamere	Cheshire	1812	Remains of the Forests of Mara and Mondrem; outside of normal forest administration	Sandstone with glacial sands and gravels and fertile clay;wetlands
Duffield Frith	Derbyshire		A group of six royal forests	
East Derbyshire	Derbyshire			
Epping Forest part of Waltham Forest	Essex	1878	Epping Forest Act 1878 established preservation and common rights	
Forest of Essex	Essex	1204	Entire county afforested to 1204	
Essex, north	Essex	1204	"North of the Stanestreet", Tendring Hundred 1228	Boulder clay, fertile lands
Exmoor Forest	Devon and Somerset	1815		High moorlands
Farndale Forest	Yorkshire	1209		
Feckenham Forest	Worcestershire and Warwickshire	1622–31	Riots on disafforestation 1630–31	Midland clay plain, woodlands
Filwood	Somerset		Part of Kingswood	
Freemantle Forest	Hampshire			
Galtres	Yorkshire	1629		
Geddington	Northamptonshire	1676	Part of Rockingham Forest	
Gillingham Forest	Dorset	1625		Heavy clay soils, dense oak forest
Groveley Forest	Wiltshire	1500s		
Haughmond	Shropshire			
Hainault	Essex	1851	Part of Essex Forest	
Hartforth	Yorkshire	1203		
Harewood	Herefordshire			Midlands clay plain
Hastings, Rape of	Sussex	1206–07		
Hatfield Forest	Essex		Part of former Essex Forest	
Hay of Hereford	Herefordshire			Midlands clay plain
Forest of High Peak	Derbyshire			
Horwood	Herefordshire			
Forest of Huntingdonshire	Huntingdonshire		Mainly Forests of Weybridge (Wauberghe), Sapley and Herthey. Whole small county in C13th.	
Inglewood Forest	Cumberland		Sometimes including Allerdale	
Irchenfield Forest	Herefordshire	1251		
Isle of Wight Forest	Hampshire			
Kesteven Forest	Lincolnshire Fens	1230	'Forest of the March' NB: this is not the modern forestry management district of the same name	Marsh, fens
Keynsham Forest	Somerset		Alias Kingswood	
Kingswood	Gloucestershire		Alias Keynsham	
Kilpeck	Herefordshire			
King's Cliffe	Northamptonshire		Part of Rockingham Forest	
Kinver Forest	Staffordshire formerly extending into Worcestershire			Midland clay plain, woodlands
Knaresborough Forest	Yorkshire			
Lee	Rutland		Or Leighfield	
Langwith Hay	Yorkshire			
Leicester Forest	Leicestershire	1628	Riots occurred at disafforestation.	
Long Forest	Shropshire		Included Longmynd, Stapelwood, Burswood, Lythwood and Stapleton	Midland clay plain, woodlands
Long Mynd or Strattondale	Shropshire			
Lonsdale (including Wyresdale and Quernsmore)	Lancashire	1267		
Linwood	Hampshire		Part of the New Forest	
Macclesfield Forest	Cheshire		See Delamere Forest	
Malvern Forest	Worcestershire	1290	Later listed as a chase	Midland clay plain, woodlands; upland moors
Malvern Chase	Worcestershire	1632, 1676	Strictly a chase, but 'disaforrested' with riots, confirmed 1676; Malvern Hills Act 1884 established preservation and common rights	Midland clay plain, woodlands; upland moors
Mara et Mondrum	Cheshire	1812	Delamere Forest is a remnant	
Melchet	Wiltshire	1577–1614	In southeast of county, between Clarendon and Hampshire border	
Melksham and Chippenham Forest	Wiltshire	1623		Heavy clay soils, dense oak forest
Mendip Forest	Somerset		Also known as Cheddar	
Forest of Middlesex	Middlesex and part of modern Hertfordshire	1218		
Morfe Forest	Shropshire		lying east and southeast of Bridgnorth	Midland clay plain, woodlands
Needwood Forest	Staffordshire, east		was parcel of the Duchy of Lancaster; Chase?	
Neroche Forest	Somerset	1627–29		
New Forest	Hampshire	1877	New Forest Act 1877 established preservation and rights of common	Sandy, gravelly acid soils; dry oak, birch wood
New Forest, Staffordshire	Staffordshire	1204		
North Petherton	Somerset			
Forest of Northumberland	Northumberland	1280		
Ombersley and Horewell	Worcestershire	1229		Midland clay plain, woodlands
Ongar	Essex			
Ouse and Derwent	Yorkshire	1234		
Oxford and Stamford Bridges	Northamptonshire, Oxfordshire, Buckinghamshire and Huntingdonshire			
Pamber Forest	Hampshire	1614	Granted to John Waller and Thomas Pursell	
Peak	Derbyshire	1639–1674		Limestone uplands
Penchet	Wiltshire		Part of Clarendon Forest	
Pendle	Lancashire			
Pickering Forest	North Yorkshire	1639		Sandstone upland plateau
Poorstock Forest	Dorset		(see Powerstock)	
Purbeck	Dorset	1550	Granted to Duke of Somerset	
Rockingham Forest	Northamptonshire	1638 & 1795-6	Including Brigstock, Cliffe, Geddington and Northampton Park; Bailiwicks disafforested 1790s	Clay soils, woodlands
Forest of Rossendale	Lancashire			
Forest of Rutland, with Sauvey Forest	Leicestershire	1398	Granted to the Duke of Abermarle	
Ryedale	Yorkshire	1204		
Salcey Forest	Buckinghamshire and Northamptonshire	1825		Clay soils, woodlands
Sauvey	Leicestershire	1236	Except Withcote, 1627	
Savernake Forest	Berkshire and Wiltshire	1550	Or Marlborough Forest; Granted to Duke of Somerset	
Selwood Forest	Somerset and Wiltshire	1627–29		Heavy clay soils, dense oak forest
Sherwood Forest	Nottinghamshire	1818	Famous by its historic association with the legend of Robin Hood.	Clay plain, woodlands
Shirlett Forest	Shropshire		Final extent was a small area northwest of Bridgnorth	
Shotover Forest	Oxfordshire		Including Stowood	Clay soils, woodlands
Skipton	Yorkshire			
Somerton Warren	Somerset			
Spaunton	Yorkshire			
Stapelwood (including Buriwood, Lythewood and Stepelton)	Shropshire			
Surrey, south	Surrey	1191	South of the Guildford Road	
Trawden	Lancashire			
Treville	Herefordshire	1230	Granted to John of Monmouth	
Waltham Forest	Essex		Last remnant of Forest of Essex	
Windsor Forest	Berkshire, Surrey and negligibly Hampshire	1813		Sandy, gravelly acid soils; dry oak, birch wood
Forest of Wirral	Cheshire	1376		
Whittlewood Forest	Buckinghamshire, Northamptonshire and Oxfordshire			Clay soils, woodlands
Woodstock Forest	Oxfordshire			
Woolmer Forest	Hampshire	1855		Sandy, gravelly acid soils; dry oak, birch wood
Wrekin Forest	Shropshire		(more strictly Mount Gilbert Forest) (including Wellington and Wombridge) and the associated Forest of Haughmond	Midland clay plain, woodlands
Wychwood Forest	Oxfordshire	1853		Heavy clay soils, dense oak forest
Wyre Forest	Worcestershire and Shropshire		Strictly only a chase	
Yardley Chase	Northants			

=== Ireland ===
Only one royal forest is known to have been formed in the Lordship of Ireland.

Name of forest	County	Disafforestation date	Notes	Soil or landscape
Glencree	Wicklow	c. 1315	Sir Thomas Fitzadam was Royal Forester of Glencree in 1219. In 1244, sixty does and twenty bucks were ordered to be "taken alive in the king's parks nearest to the port of Chester to be sent to the port of Dalkey, Ireland, and delivered to the king's Treasurer in Dublin to stock the king's Park of Glencry." In 1282, William le Deveneys was granted 12 oaks from the King's forest of Glencree. William de Meones was keeper of the forest and of "the Queen's timber works" in 1290. It is last mentioned in the reign of Edward I and is believed to have been destroyed during the Bruce campaign in Ireland (1315–18).	Podzol, oak trees

== See also ==
- Ancient woodland
- Chase (land)
- Crown land
- Deer park (England)
- English land law
- English Lowlands beech forests
- History of the forest in Central Europe
- Hunting license
- Perambulation
- Verderer

== Bibliography ==
- Ball, F. Elrington (1926). The Judges in Ireland 1221–1921. London: John Murray.
- Bazeley, Margaret Ley (1921). "The Extent of the English Forest in the Thirteenth Century". Transactions of the Royal Historical Society. 4: 140–172. doi:10.2307/3678331. JSTOR 3678331.
- Braunstein, Philippe (1990). "Forêts d'Europe au Moyen-Âge". Les Cahiers du Centre de Recherches Historiques (6). doi:10.4000/ccrh.2859.
- "Cannock Chase at Birches Valley". Cannock Chase District Council. Archived from the original on 23 September 2015.
- "Epping Forest Act 1878" (PDF). City of London Corporation.
- Crittall, Elizabeth, ed. (1959). "Victoria County History: Wiltshire: Vol 4: Royal forests". British History Online. University of London.
- Darby, H. C. (1986). Domesday England. Cambridge University Press. ISBN 978-0521310260 – via Google Books.
- This article incorporates text from a publication now in the public domain: Chambers, Ephraim, ed. (1728). "Bloody hand". Cyclopædia, or an Universal Dictionary of Arts and Sciences. Vol. 1 (1st ed.). James and John Knapton, et al. p. 110. Archived from the original on 4 March 2016.
- Dugdale, William (3 August 1846). "Monasticon Anglicanum...a History of the Abbies and Other Monasteries...and Cathedral and Collegiate Churches...in England and Wales". Bohn – via Google Books.
- Falkiner, Caesar Litton. The Woods of Ireland. Corpus of Electronic Texts.
- Gilbert, J.M. (1979). Hunting and Hunting Reserves in Medieval Scotland. Edinburgh: John Donald Ltd.
- Grafton Regis History and Heritage (CD ROM). Grafton Regis Millennium Project. 2004.
- Grant, Raymond (1991). The royal forests of England. Wolfeboro Falls, NH: Alan Sutton. ISBN 0-86299-781-X. OL 1878197M.
- Henderson, Ernest F. (1896). "The Dialogue Concerning the Exchequer. circa 1180". Archived from the original on 8 February 2007.
- "The Assize of the Forest (1184)". Constitution Society. Archived from the original on 11 January 2006.
- "House of Lords Journal Volume 4: 7 August 1641". Journal of the House of Lords: Volume 4, 1629-42. His Majesty's Stationery Office: 349.
- "Birklands and Bilhaugh". defra.gov.uk. Joint Nature Conservation Committee. Archived from the original on 14 July 2014.
- Jørgensen, Dolly (2010). "The roots of the English royal forest, in Proceedings of the Battle Conference 2009" (PDF). Anglo-Norman Studies. XXXII. Boydell & Brewer: 114–128.
- Le Fanu, T. P. (1893). "The Royal Forest of Glencree". The Journal of the Royal Society of Antiquaries of Ireland. 3 (3): 268–280. JSTOR 25508042.
- Lees, Edwin (1877). The Forest and Chase of Malvern. Transactions of the Malvern Naturalists' Field Club. pp. 16–17.
- Lovelace, D. (2001). (Unpublished) History of Aconbury Woods (Report). As cited by "Herefordshire Through Time". Herefordshire Council. Archived from the original on 8 September 2015.
- Loyn, H.R. (1991). Anglo-Saxon England and the Norman Conquest (2nd ed.). Longman. pp. 378–382.
- "The Text of Magna Carta". Fordham University. Archived from the original on 10 September 2014.
- Manwood, John (1598). "Chapter 1". A Treatise and Discourse of the Lawes of the Forrest.
- Manwood, John (1717), Manwood's Treatise of the Forest Laws: Shewing Not Only the Laws Now in Force, But the Original .., In the Savoy, Printed by E. Nutt (executrix of J . Nutt, assignee of E . Sayer) for B. Lintott [etc.], OCLC 67402678, OL 20449254M
- Martin, David (January 2017). "Where have all the Oak trees gone?". Archived from the original on 3 June 2023.
- Medcalf, David (14 December 2019). "Ambling through the oak woods". Irish Independent.
- "Chief Justice of the Forests South of the Trent: Records of Forest Eyres, Charles I". National Archives.
- "Sherwood Forest NNR". Natural England.
- Pettit, Philip Arthur John (1968), The Royal Forests of Northamptonshire, Gateshead: Northumberland Press for the Northamptonshire Record Society, OL 19197766M
- Rackham, Oliver (1990). Trees and Woodland in the British Landscape. New York: Phoenix Press. pp. 176–177. ISBN 978-1-8421-2469-7.
- Samson, Alexander (2012). Locus Amoenus: Gardens and Horticulture in the Renaissance. p. 6.
- Sharp, Buchanan (1980). In Contempt of all Authority. Berkeley: University of California Press. ISBN 0-520-03681-6. OL 4742314M. 0520036816.
- "Hickling – Highgate". A Topographical Dictionary of England. 1848.
- Turbutt, G (1999). A History of Derbyshire: Medieval Derbyshire. Vol. 2. Cardiff: Merton Priory Press.
- Turner, G. J. (1901), Select pleas of the forest (Select pleas of the forest ed.), London: B. Quaritch, OL 13502647M
- Young, Charles R. (1979). The royal forests of medieval England. Philadelphia: University of Pennsylvania Press. ISBN 0-8122-7760-0. OL 4747090M. 0812277600.
