= Derbyshire South =

- Proposed unitary authority area
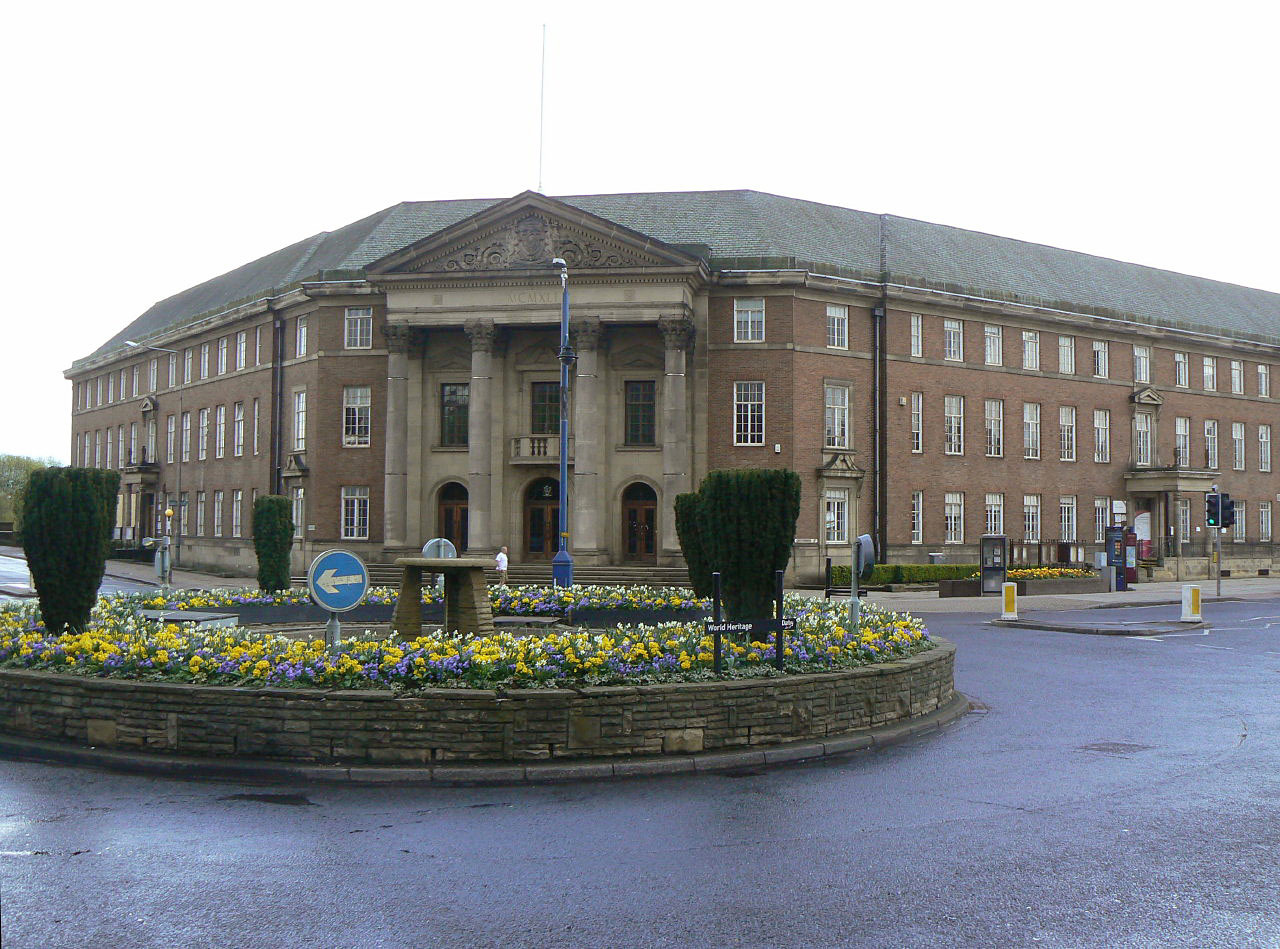
- Derby Council House

- Derbyshire South shown within Derbyshire
- Interactive map
- Coordinates: 52.9232°N 1.4740°W
- Sovereign state: United Kingdom
- Country: England
- Region: East Midlands
- Ceremonial county: Derbyshire

Government
  - Type: Unitary authority
  - Body: Derbyshire South Council

Area
  - Total: 238 sq mi (617 km^{2})

Population (2024 estimate)
  - Total: 551,325
- Time zone: UTC+0 (GMT)
  - Summer (DST): UTC+1 (BST)

Derbyshire South or Southern Derbyshire was a proposed unitary authority area in the ceremonial county of Derbyshire, England. It was planned to be formed on 1 April 2028. The largest settlement would have been Derby and other settlements include Swadlincote, Ilkeston, Long Eaton, Belper and Duffield. The area has a population of 538,381.

It was to be formed from the existing Derby unitary authority area, and the Erewash and South Derbyshire two-tier districts plus 14 parishes from Amber Valley. The rest of Derbyshire will form part of the Derbyshire North unitary. Plans to create it were halted in September 2026 and the first election was cancelled. In October 2026, plans to create it were withdrawn.

== Formation ==
The district is being formed as part of ongoing local government changes throughout England, in which all areas of the country that have separate county councils and district councils will see those replaced with single-tier, or unitary, local governance. The proposal was backed by Chesterfield, Derby, Erewash and High Peak Councils. The three alternative proposals for a different split between northern and southern unitaries in Derbyshire, and Derbyshire County Council's proposal for a single unitary for the whole county, including Derby, were not accepted.

In September 2026, the Derbyshire proposals were halted by the government and placed under review. In October 2026, plans to create it were withdrawn. The decision was threatened with judicial review by Amber Valley Borough Council.

== Governance ==
It would have been run by Derbyshire South Council, which would have comprised 79 councillors.

== Parishes ==
Derby, Ilkeston, Long Eaton and Swadlincote are currently unparished, the rest of the area is parished. The parishes that will come from Amber Valley are: Duffield, Holbrook, Horsley, Horsley Woodhouse, Kedleston, Kirk Langley, Mackworth, Mapperley, Quarndon, Ravensdale Park, Smalley, Turnditch, Weston Underwood, Windley.
