= Shottle and Postern =

Civil parish in Derbyshire, England

Coordinates: 53.037°N 1.539°W

- Civil parish
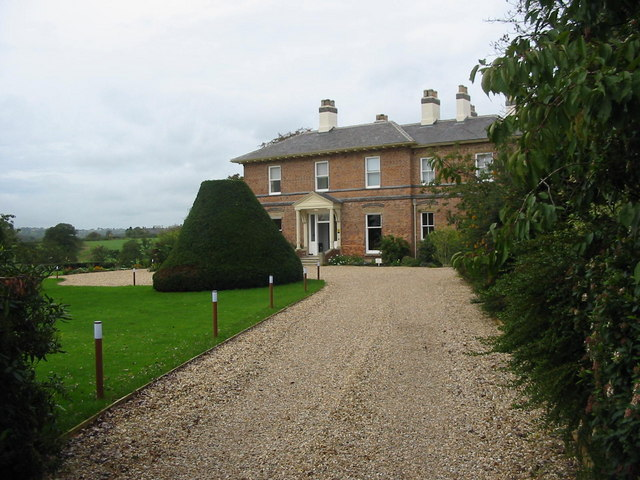
- Shottle Hall

- Location within Derbyshire
- Interactive map of Shottle and Postern
- Area: 5.93 sq mi (15.4 km^{2})
- Population: 270 (2021)
  - Density: 46/sq mi (18/km^{2})
- OS grid reference: SK 3149
  - London: 120 mi (190 km) SE
- District: Amber Valley
- Shire county: Derbyshire
- Region: East Midlands
- Country: England
- Sovereign state: United Kingdom
- Settlements: Shottle; Cowers Lane; Shottlegate
- Post town: BELPER
- Postcode district: DE56
- Dialling code: 01773
- Police: Derbyshire
- Fire: Derbyshire
- Ambulance: East Midlands
- UK Parliament: Derbyshire Dales
- Website: shottleposternpc.org.uk

Shottle and Postern is a civil parish within the Amber Valley district, which is in the county of Derbyshire, England. Sparsely built up with much rural expanse, its population was 270 residents in the 2021 census. The parish is 120 miles (190 km) north west of London, 9 miles (14 km) north west of the county town of Derby, and 2 3/4 miles (4.4 km) equidistant of the nearest market towns of Belper and Wirksworth. It shares a boundary with the parishes of Alderwasley, Ashleyhay, Belper, Hazelwood, Idridgehay and Alton, Turnditch and Windley.

== Geography ==
=== Location ===
==== Placement and size ====
Shottle and Postern parish is surrounded by the following local Derbyshire places:

- Alderwasley and Wirksworth to the north
- Hazelwood and Windley to the south
- Belper Lane End, Blackbrook and Farnah Green to the east
- Idridgehay Green and Turnditch to the west.

It is 5.93 square miles (15.4 km^{2}; 1,540 ha) in area, 3 1/2 miles (5.6 km) in length and 2 1/2 miles (4.0 km) in width at its broadest, within the western portion of the Amber Valley district, and is to the centre south of the Derbyshire county. The parish is roughly bounded by land features such as the Wilder Brook to the east, Postern Hill to the south, and the River Ecclesbourne, Ecclesbourne Valley Railway line and Carr Brook to the west.

==== Settlements ====
There are a number of areas of built environment within the parish, outside of this containing substantial rural expanse and farmland. The main locales are:

- Shottle - this is to the centre north of the parish and consists of a sparsely populated hamlet
- Cowers Lane - this is a linear settlement in the south west of the parish, surrounding a crossroads
- Shottlegate - split into two across the parish boundary into Belper in the south east.

Postern, while referenced in the parish name, consists of the southern portion with scattered residences and farms, and is predominantly rural. A small portion of Hazelwood village falls into the parish by its south eastern extent, as well as for Turnditch in the south western area.

==== Routes ====
The A517 road is the primary road within the parish, running through the south of the parish between Belper and Ashbourne. In the parish it cuts through the Shottlegate and Cowers Lane settlements. The B5023 runs through the south west of the parish from Wirksworth to Duffield, cutting across the A517 at the Cowers Lane crossroads, and exiting to the south of the parish.

=== Environment ===
==== Landscape ====
The parish rests on the edge of the valley of the River Ecclesbourne, the ground lowest in the south and west, rising steeply towards the centre and north and hills in the south. The parish is urbanised mainly to the middle along communication routes, but is otherwise overwhelmingly rural and farmland. Substantial areas of trees are few, with a small coppice north of Hazelwood at Postern Hill, Handley Wood to the east of the parish north of Shottlegate, Gibbet Wood to the north west and scattered clusters to the parish centre around brooks near Shottle.

==== Geology ====
The bedrock of the parish is complex with several layers found. In the parish south and south west is in the Morridge Formation, which is made up of mudstones, siltstones and sandstones, formed between 329 and 320 million years ago during the Carboniferous period. The Marsden Formation meets this in the south east and centre, again consisting of mudstone and siltstone formed between 321.5 and 320 million years ago during the same period. North and east has the Marsden overlain with Ashover Grit which is a sandstone sedimentary bedrock formed in the same era. North west is the Bowland Shale formation, primarily mudstone and siltstone bedrock formed between 337 and 319 million years ago during the Carboniferous period.

Towards the centre are till with diamicton, which is sedimentary superficial deposit formed between 860 and 116 thousand years ago during the Quaternary period. To the west around the River Ecclesbourne is alluvium with clay, silt, sand and gravel sedimentary superficial deposit formed between 11.8 thousand years ago and the present also during the Quaternary period.

==== Hydrological features ====
The River Ecclesbourne runs alongside much of the parish western boundary but only enters south of Cowers Lane before exiting and draining into the River Derwent at Duffield. Other watercourses throughout the parish exist, including the Carr Brook to the north west and the Loud Brook/Franker Brook which is centrally placed and comes through Cowers Lane, all of which are subsidiaries of the Ecclesbourne. The Shipley Brook is to the east and runs near Shottlegate before feeding the Derwent at Belper.

==== Land elevation ====
The south of the parish surrounding the Ecclesbourne valley where the river, parish boundary, B5023 road and railway meet contains the lowest area, at 78 metres (256 ft). The area rises towards the settlements in the centre and north: Cowers Lane is 92–96 metres (302–315 ft), Shottlegate 130–150 metres (430–490 ft) and Shottle 192–235 metres (630–771 ft). The highest location is a point along the northern parish boundary, measuring 277 metres (909 ft).

== History ==
=== Toponymy ===
Shottle was the only settlement to be listed in the Domesday 1086 landholding survey. It was described as Sothelle, which was thought to mean a 'hill with a steep slope', likely in reference to the Ecclesbourne valley profile. Postern was first termed in the 14th century, sometimes as Postorne, and is possibly named from 'house made with posts' or 'back gate, side way'.

=== Prehistory to early modern history ===
The parish holds very little proof of its prehistoric past, with relics from that era recorded mainly in the surrounding region outside the boundary such as at Ashleyhay and Milford, although a possible round barrow along with flints was found north of Shottle in 1957, dating from the Bronze Age (2350 BC to 701 BC). There is evidence of a Roman (AD 43 to AD 410) presence in the area with kilns and pottery fragments found in modern times within the Cowers Lane and Shottlegate vicinity. In 1066, at the time of the Norman Conquest, the area was held by Gamal who had oversight over a number of manors in Derbyshire, and by 1086, the Domesday Book recorded the Lord of the manor was Godric who answered to the overall tenant-in-chief, Henry de Ferrers. An outlying estate Wallstone, to the west of the parish was at the time associated to Shottle and also reported in the book. Further afield, Duffield, Shottle, Holbrook, Milford, and Makeney made up the two manors of Duffield and Shottle. Holbrook, Milford, and Makeney were considered to be waste lands, Duffield and Shottle together there were approximately 1,500 acres of arable land and 10,000 acres of pasturable woods, the remainder of the ancient Duffield parish was made up of meadow, swamp, river, brook, and detached pieces of waste land.

It is thought the Ferrers enjoyed the chase and used their manor for hunting, a moated enclosure 'The Mottes', was discovered north of Shottle, and believed to date from this period or later, it possibly was a hunting lodge or a deer enclosure, and in the 20th century designated a scheduled monument. The family were granted in 1252 free warren to the wider region by Henry III. In 1266, the estates of Robert de Ferrers, 6th Earl of Derby, a protagonist in the Second Barons' War, were confiscated by Henry III, who granted them to his son the Earl of Leicester, known as Edmund Crouchback. From that period these remained in the hands of the Duchy of Lancaster which was a private estate holding for heirs to the English throne, and the holdings in Derbyshire surrounding Duffield became part of the Duffield Frith royal forest. The term forest was not in reference to a thickly wooded region but instead was a location used for hunting, although it was more tree covered than in modern times. The area was by medieval times in the Appletree hundred, and what would become the Shottle and Postern area was split across the Colebrook and Duffield (sometimes called Chevin) wards respectively, the boundary meeting at today's modern A517 road, and within the ancient parish.

In the forest seven parks were formally established, used to hold deer and other wild animals for hunting. Royalty, nobility and gentry visited, but the primary park of the Frith was at nearby Ravensdale Park which contained a spacious lodge to cater to aristocrats. Shottle Park was demarcated north of the route between Belper and Ashbourne, and Postern Park was to the south, in later surveys Shottle Park was described as 7 miles (11 km) in circumference, and Postern as 3 miles (4.8 km) 'about'. The Duchy records for the parks show entries from the very late 13th century, but formally designated as parks by 1330. In 1398 a new entrance called Cowhouse Gate was to allow access to Postern Park which would become Cowhouse Lane, and came off the Belper-Ashbourne route. Shottle and Postern parks still contained functions other than holding deer, at Cowhouse Lane a large cattle dairy was kept, and Shottlegate was the main entrance to the parks, around which a community developed. Names of local roads and features betray this former use: Palerow Lane and Pale-fence Farm are examples of palisades being erected on the northern boundary. Forest law was used to administer the Frith from 1399, which still had locals accessing and using resources and whom had certain rights and privileges such as being able to obtain fuel, wood and graze animals amongst others. The King held oversight on these, as part of the feudal system then in place, inhabitants providing produce from land, tithe and other taxes, to local and national service in times of war. During the 14th and 15th century the parks began to be sometimes long term leased out to nobles.

During Henry VIII's rule the nearby manor of Alderwasley was granted to the Lowe family and Colebrook ward abolished, but Shottle Park was kept in the remaining area of the Frith and added to Duffield ward. Shottle and Postern was described as ‘mostly stony, indifferent land except here and there in the valley and by the rills thereof’, yet Postern had areas of good pasture too as it was in the midst of two river valleys which enabled the location of the cowhouse, this was able to support the main occupation in the area, which was reported in local population and tax assessments as husbandry and growing corn, with a large increase in population from 9 households in the late 16th century to nearly 70 in 1618 as the forest increasingly was unused for its original purpose and encroached upon. From the 16th century the park system was increasingly untenable after the Wars of the Roses and poaching which led to a loss in the deer population. This resulted in a review of the forest resources being made, and the main interests of the monarchs became the ancient timber to build ships and to counter the threat of the Spanish Armada during the Anglo-Spanish Wars, also to use as fuel for smelting.

The parks were by the time of Philip II of Spain and Mary I in the middle 1550s leased for their timber and deer which in turn affected the traditional forest economy. In the later 1550s onwards it is thought the parks were leased by Queen Elizabeth I to George Talbot, 6th Earl of Shrewsbury, who had begun to be influential and obtained Duchy roles such as Master Forester of the Frith; by the early 1590s after his death his wife the Bess of Hardwick had oversight, the Earls of Devonshire were descendants and recorded as holding some of the estate. and under James I, the Shottle and Postern areas were passed in 1604 to the Earl of Shrewsbury. A daughter, Mary Talbot inherited these estates and later married William Herbert, 3rd Earl of Pembroke. After Herbert's death in 1630 these were again conveyed in 1631 to his successor Philip Herbert, 4th Earl of Pembroke and later owned by Christian Cavendish, Countess of Devonshire, the wife of William Cavendish, 2nd Earl of Devonshire and residents at Chatsworth House, the family confirming their ownership with the monarch in 1661, and in later wills in 1687 were endowing to the poor of Shottle and Postern. The end of the wider Duffield Frith came in 1632 when the Duchy of Lancaster returned it to Charles I and it was eventually enclosed, arguments with commoners on distribution of land throughout the Frith rumbled on throughout the 17th and into the 18th century.

=== Late modern period to present ===
A school was established in 1715 and a trust fund also created for educating children of the parish after endowments in the 1700s by a local family and the Devonshires. The Anglican church, St Lawrence lies on the outskirts of Shottle village. It was built in 1861 by the Chatsworth estate as Shottle Mission Church. It was rededicated as St Lawrence's during 1961 in honour of the then vicar's father. Religious groups established in the area include Wesleyans in 1816 and Baptists in 1882 who built a lecture room at Shottle.

In 1764 Parliament authorised a turnpike road between Ashbourne and Openwoodgate. This ran in an east–west direction via Cowers Lane and Shottlegate, reusing the road between the former two parks. At Openwoodgate it joined the Derby-Sheffield turnpike. Cowers Lane is reputedly a corruption of Cowhouse Lane which happened between the census years of 1891 and 1901, after the post office opened in 1875. It was derived after an inquiry by the post office headquarters to the branch office at the village as to the correct spelling, the postmaster simply counted up the number of letters received, the number with the misspelled name outnumbered the original spelling, which was summarily reported back and the later name kept. The branch closed in 1990, and replaced by the nearby Turnditch office.

Postern Mill was erected in 1792 by W Allsop on a minor tributary of the River Ecclesbourne, John Holbrook and Sons took it over soon after and operated the mill until 1939. A three-storey stone building with a kiln alongside and typical for its time, grain bins and a sack hoist were on the top floor, while the middle floor hosted two pairs of French millstones, one for processing oats. It was demolished in 1950 and only the dam is extant.

Shottle Hall was built near Cowers Lane in 1861. It was established as a model farm built for John Bell Crompton, who was a banker and prominent innovative agriculturalist. His bank went on to become a component of National Westminster Bank. The farm includes a 'gentry-style' main house, with an additional residence at the back, possibly to allow a farm manager to be onsite. There is a number of farm buildings around a courtyard, including stables, cattle byres alongside foddering, cart shed, pig sties among others. It is also an events venue and was refurbished in 2005. Shottle Gate House was the only sizeable ownership outside the Chatsworth holdings, it was owned by descendants of the industrialist Strutt family based in Belper, and was built in 1855. The family previously had links to the area; the mother of Jedidiah Strutt who began the mills with Richard Arkwright at Cromford and built his own at Belper, was born there. Later still, the Strutts mansion at Bridge Hill, obtained stone from Shottle, possibly at a location near Lambhouse Lane.

The Ecclesbourne Valley Railway was the brainchild of local coal mine owners who wished for a faster means to get their output to the Manchester textile mills. By 1865 it was operating, built closely paralleling the River Ecclesbourne, it included a station at Cowers Lane. This was later changed in name to Shottle on request of the owners of nearby Shottle Hall. Some time after inauguration, it was requested by the Chatsworth estate that a bridge be constructed to enable their farmers to easily reach farmland on its western side. Hazelwood Viaduct (known locally as Travis's Folly and named after one of the affected farmers) was built south of Cowers Lane to allow this access. The viaduct was demolished in 1933 by the Royal Engineers, with two arches left over the river. The line was progressively run down and passenger services were suspended and closed during 1947–49, all the stations including Shottle continued to be used for freight until 1967 when they were closed. Some limestone traffic continued until 1989, and the line placed in abeyance, but kept due its ongoing strategic status. It was later leased to a railway heritage group who began to refurbish the line and facilities, eventually buying it outright, opening the full length by 2011 and running limited services. The Shottle station was later reopened in 2014.

By the early Victorian era the former parks made up a joint township and had 607 inhabitants and at the 1851 census, recorded as having 90 houses and 467 inhabitants, From that period onwards the population reduced as villagers left for industrial work locally and in cities. The area continued to be a township within Duffield until 1866 when it was created as a civil parish, in 1886 it was enlarged by obtaining territory from Duffield and Hazelwood.

A local Women's Institute group was begun in 1918, and in 1923 they moved into a purpose-built premises at Shottlegate.

The Chatsworth estate maintained a regional office for Shottle until 1950, and continue to own the vast majority of land in the parish, with several mainly tenanted dairy farms, some arable farming and accommodation and leisure facilities.

A 1974 horror movie, Let Sleeping Corpses Lie, starring Ray Lovelock and Arthur Kennedy, although primarily an Italian-based production by Jorge Grau, was also filmed in the UK, with scenes shot in Shottle. An annual rock festival was held during September near Shottle, called the Southern Uprising festival until 2023.

== Governance ==
=== Local bodies ===
Shottle and Postern parish is managed at the first level of public administration through a parish council.

At district level, the wider area is overseen by Amber Valley borough council. Derbyshire County Council provides the highest level strategic services locally.

=== Electoral representation ===
For electoral purposes, the parish is part of the Alport And South West Parishes ward of Amber Valley district, within the Alport And Duffield electoral division for Derbyshire county elections; and in the Derbyshire Dales parliamentary constituency.

== Demographics ==
=== Population ===
There are 270 residents recorded in total within Shottle and Postern parish for the 2021 census, an increase from 266 (1.5%) of the 2011 census. The population majority in 2011 was mainly working age adults, with the 18–64 years age bracket taking up 63.6%. Infants to teenage years are a sizeable grouping of around 19.1%, with elderly residents (65 years and older) making up a slightly smaller number (17.4%) of the parish population.

=== Labour market ===
During 2011, a substantial number of 16 years old locals and above are in some way performing regular work, with 75% classed as economically active. 25% are economically inactive, of which 17.2% are reported as retired. A majority of residents' occupations are in agriculture, forestry and fishing, manufacturing, professional, scientific and technical activities, education, along with health and social work activities (59%).

=== Housing and mobility ===
110 residences existed throughout the parish in 2011. The majority of housing stock is of the detached type (78%), then semi-detached (17%) or terraced (3%) and the remainder being flats, maisonettes or apartments in a commercial building (2%). The large majority of these (>50) are owner occupied, with the bulk of other tenure being private rentals. The vast majority of households (99%) report having the use of a car or van.

== Community ==
=== Amenities and local economy ===
The parish has a number of publicly accessible facilities and commercial business activities, primarily based around the settlements and farms. As well as agriculture prevalent throughout the rural areas, other business interests include hospitality and public houses at Cowers Lane, Shottlegate and Shottle, Shottle has some manufacturing and antiques restoration services, Shottlegate has a Women's Institute building which doubles as a parish council meeting room, Cowers Lane has a vehicle repair shop, fuel suppliers and recycling facilities.

== Landmarks ==
=== Conservation ===
==== Structural protections ====
===== Listed buildings =====
There are six items of national architectural merit throughout the parish, being either 17th or 18th century farmhouses as well as turnpike mileposts.

===== Scheduled monument =====
There is an ancient location within the vicinity of Shottle, which was a moated site sometimes known as The Mottes. Its exact use is unknown, but as the wider area was parkland it is suggested it was the site of a stone based structure, possibly a hunting lodge or deer-related enclosure.

==== Environmental designations ====
===== Derwent Valley Mills World Heritage Site =====
The Derwent Valley Mills area covers a number of historic industrial sites and settlements which date from the beginning of the Industrial Revolution, several of which lie within the River Derwent valley. A UNESCO World Heritage Site recognising this was delineated in December 2001. Although the parish is not in this region, an eastern portion of Shottle and Postern stretching to Shottlegate lies within a wider buffer zone in place to protect the core site.

=== Tourism ===
The Midshires Way is a long-distance footpath and bridleway through much of the Midlands. This route enters and exits the eastern portion of the parish. Localised medium length trails include the Derbyshire Portway, another footpath which follows the same route in the same vicinity, while the Ecclesbourne Way parallels the river, in the west of the parish.

== Transport ==
=== Bus and community services ===
The parish is accessible by public transport, services travel between Derby and Wirksworth. The Sixes bus route operated by Trent Barton runs through Shottlegate and Cowers Lane along the A517 and B5023 roads. It is a scheduled route, with buses on hour intervals for much of the day and evening throughout the week and weekends. Twice hourly buses run between Belper and Ashbourne during daytime and early evening, six days a week by operator High Peak. Weekly community transport services are available at Cowers Lane and Shottle.

=== Heritage railway ===
There is a heritage railway station within the fringes of Cowers Lane village, on the Ecclesbourne Valley Railway. The station opened in 1867 originally as Cowers Lane, but the name was later changed to Shottle after a request by the owner of Shottle Hall which is situated close by. Shottle station handled up to 12,000 passengers a year during its 1920s peak, and minerals and goods such as coal, coke and limestone were also transported from nearby mines and processing facilities. Agricultural produce and materials such as grain, beet by-products and fertilizer were also handled. Scheduled passenger services were ended in 1947, but the line continued to be used for excursions and special passenger trains, as well as for goods and minerals until 1964, when most services were ended. Limestone traffic continued until 1989. A railway interest group, Wyvern Rail formed in 1992 and later bought most of and progressively restored the line from Wirksworth southbound to Duffield in stages, the full length reopening by 2011. However, Shottle station required further work and was opened later in 2014. The station runs to fixed times mainly in the middle of the year during the later half of the week and weekends, on a limited run schedule. The station building and cottages were however sold after closure and remain privately owned.

== Religious sites ==
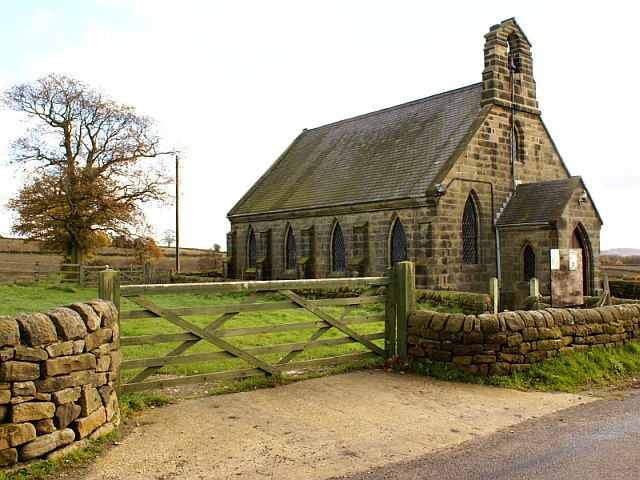
St Lawrence's Church, Shottle

St Lawrence's church lies on the outskirts of Shottle village. It was built in 1861 by the Chatsworth estate as Shottle Mission Church. It was rededicated to St Lawrence during 1961 in honour of the then vicar's father.

== Notable people ==
- Martha Strutt (nee Statham) (1701–1735), born in Shottle, mother of Jedidiah Strutt, Derbyshire industrialist
