= Listed buildings in Windley =

Windley is a civil parish in the Amber Valley district of Derbyshire, England. The parish contains eight listed buildings that are recorded in the National Heritage List for England. All the listed buildings are designated at Grade II, the lowest of the three grades, which is applied to "buildings of national importance and special interest". The parish contains the village of Windley and the surrounding countryside, and the listed buildings consist of houses, farmhouses, a public house with an outbuilding, and two mileposts.

== Buildings ==
Name and location	Photograph	Date	Notes
Puss in Boots Public House; 52.99754°N 1.52567°W		Early 18th century	The public house is in painted brick with a partly dentilled floor band, a dentilled eaves cornice, and a tile roof with stone coped gables. There are three storeys at the front and two at the rear, and an L-shaped plan with a front of three bays. On the front is a porch with flat roof, and the windows are sashes.
Flower Lillies; 53.00662°N 1.55419°W	—	18th century	A country house that has been extended and divided. It is in rendered brick, with over hanging eaves and a hipped Welsh slate roof, and is in Italianate style. There are two storeys, partly over a basement, and the northeast range has fronts of seven and five bays. The north front has a balustrade over the basement, a central Tuscan Doric porch, a segmental-headed doorway, and a balustraded parapet, and sash windows. The east front has a doorway with a rectangular fanlight, and a cast iron verandah runs along the front. The south range has a full-height canted bay windows and segmental-headed windows with moulded surrounds. In the angle of the ranges is an Italianate tower with a pyramidal roof.
Champion Farmhouse; 52.98184°N 1.51498°W	—	Early 19th century	The farmhouse is in red brick and has a hipped Welsh slate roof, gabled to the west. There are two storeys, a rectangular range with a bowed front to the east, flanked by lower ranges. The middle range contains casement windows with hood moulds, and each outer range has a blind window with round-arched head within a large recessed round-arched panel. The north and south fronts each has three bays, the middle bay recessed and containing a round-arched entrance and a recessed porch.
Home Farmhouse; 53.00672°N 1.55500°W	—	Early 19th century	The farmhouse to Flower Lillies is in rendered brick with a Welsh slate roof. There are two storeys to the north, and three to the south, and a north front of four bays. On the front is a gabled porch, and the windows are Gothic iron casements with stone lintels.
Milepost at OS 313 454; 53.00455°N 1.53573°W		Early 19th century	The milepost is on the west side of Wirksworth Road (B5023 road). It is in cast iron, and has a triangular plan, with the upper part sloping to a backplate with a curved top. On the top is the name of the parish, below it is the distance to London, and on the sides are the distances to Wirksworth and Derby.
Milepost at OS 324 443; 52.99468°N 1.51890°W		Early 19th century	The milepost is on the south side of Wirksworth Road (B5023 road). It is in cast iron, and has a triangular plan, with the upper part sloping to a backplate with a curved top. On the top is the name of the parish, below it is the distance to London, and on the sides are the distances to Wirksworth and Derby.
Windley Hall; 53.00217°N 1.53832°W		Early 19th century	The house is in rendered red brick, with a cornice and a low parapet, and hipped Welsh slate roofs. There is a central block with three storeys and three bays, a slightly projecting wing of two storeys and three bays to the right, and a recessed wing with two storeys and a single bay to the left. In the centre of the main block is a porch with fluted columns and a pedimented gable, and a round-arched doorway with a reeded surround and a fanlight. This is flanked by square bay windows with a cornice and a flat roof, and the other windows in all parts are sashes.
Outbuilding opposite Puss in Boots Public House; 52.99741°N 1.52594°W	—	19th century (probable)	The outbuilding, later converted for residential use, is in sandstone, and has a tile roof with stone coped gables. There are two storeys and three bays. In the ground floor are three doorways with quoined surrounds and stone lintels, and a square single-light window. The upper floor contains two square openings and a re-set datestone.
