= Hulland Ward =

Village in Derbyshire, England

Coordinates: 53.021°N 1.622°W

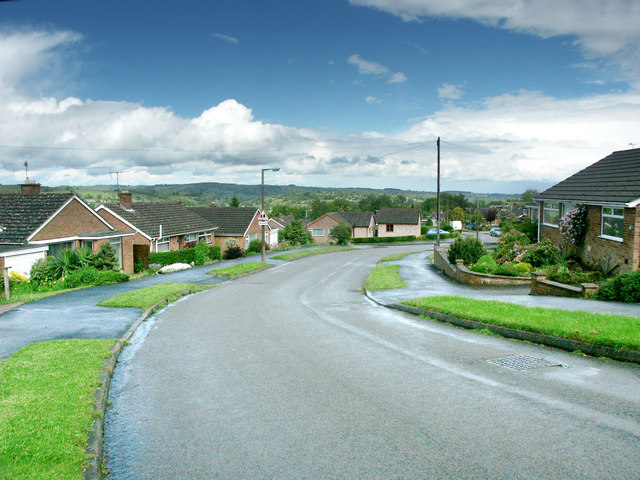
- Hulland Ward

- Location within Derbyshire
- Population: 927 (2011)
- OS grid reference: SK254471
- District: Derbyshire Dales
- Shire county: Derbyshire
- Region: East Midlands
- Country: England
- Sovereign state: United Kingdom
- Post town: ASHBOURNE
- Postcode district: DE6
- Police: Derbyshire
- Fire: Derbyshire
- Ambulance: East Midlands

Hulland Ward is a village and civil parish in the Derbyshire Dales district of Derbyshire roughly 6 miles west of Belper, Derbyshire England on the A517 road. The parish includes the hamlets of Biggin, Nether Biggin and Millington Green. Hulland Ward itself contains about 400 houses and has a population of just under 1000 inhabitants, being measured at 927 (and including Mercaston) in the 2011 Census.

It is distinct from Hulland, the next village and civil parish immediately to its west.

Originally, the village consisted of a few dwellings on the coaching road into the Duffield Frith, with the road being gated. This was known as Ward Gate and over the years, due to its proximity to Hulland Village was known as Hulland Wardgate. Sometime in the 17th century, the gate part was dropped, and the hamlet grew into the village now known as Hulland Ward.

In the Domesday Survey Hulland Village is listed as Hoilant in the care of Geoffrey d'Alselin. It was part of the lands bestowed upon Henry de Ferrers after the Norman Conquest, and also became part of Duffield Frith, with two enclosed royal parks - Mansell Park and Ravensdale Park. The latter is now a civil parish in its own right.

One of the earliest ore-stamping mills was built at Hulland Ward by Burchard Kranich in 1556.

== See also ==
- Listed buildings in Hulland Ward
- Listed buildings in Hulland
