= Cowers Lane =

Coordinates: 53.019°N 1.545°W

- Location within Derbyshire
- OS grid reference: SK306469
- Civil parish: Shottle and Postern
- District: Amber Valley
- Shire county: Derbyshire
- Region: East Midlands
- Country: England
- Sovereign state: United Kingdom
- Post town: BELPER
- Postcode district: DE56
- Dialling code: 01773 55
- Police: Derbyshire
- Fire: Derbyshire
- Ambulance: East Midlands

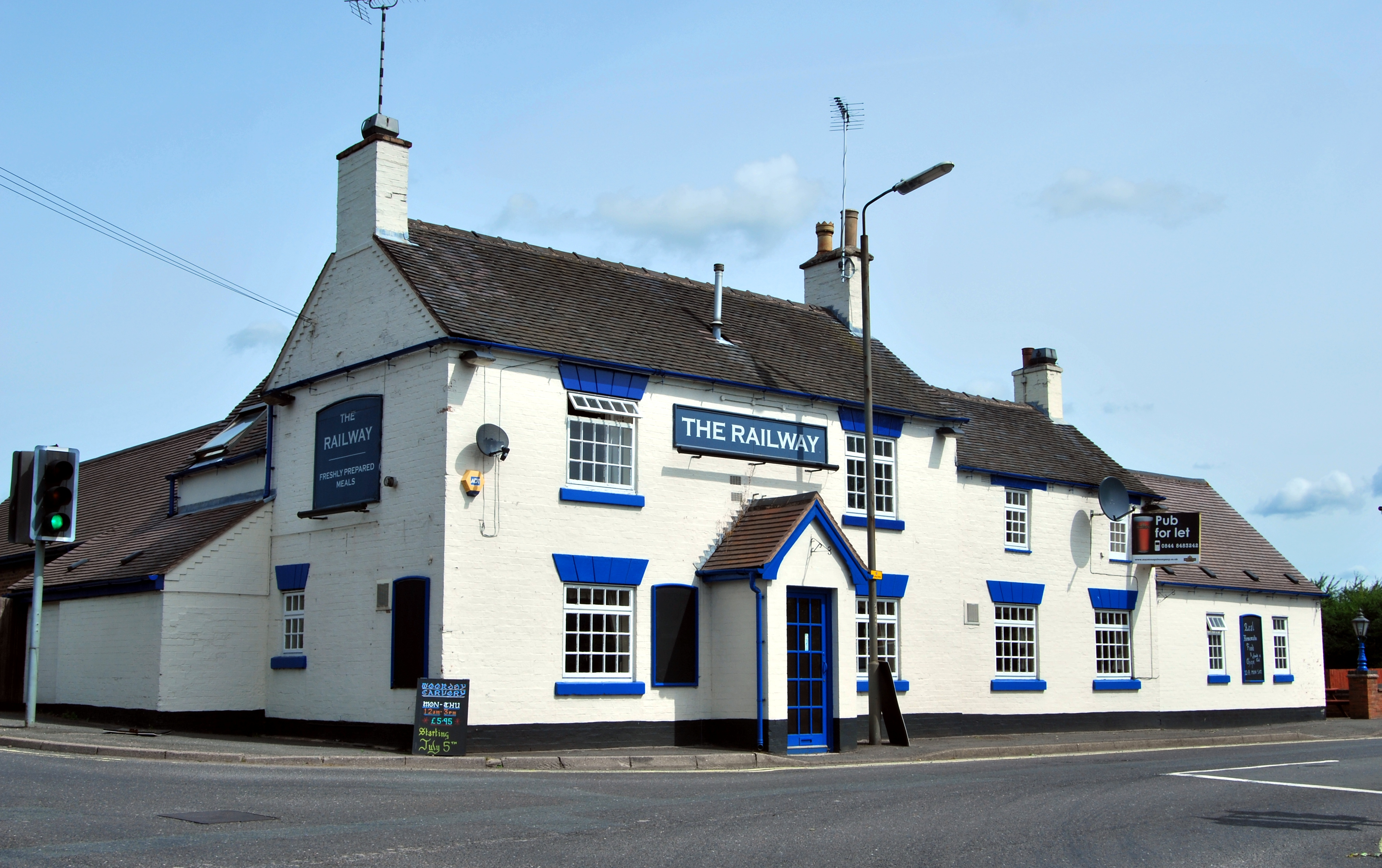
The Railway Inn, Cowers Lane

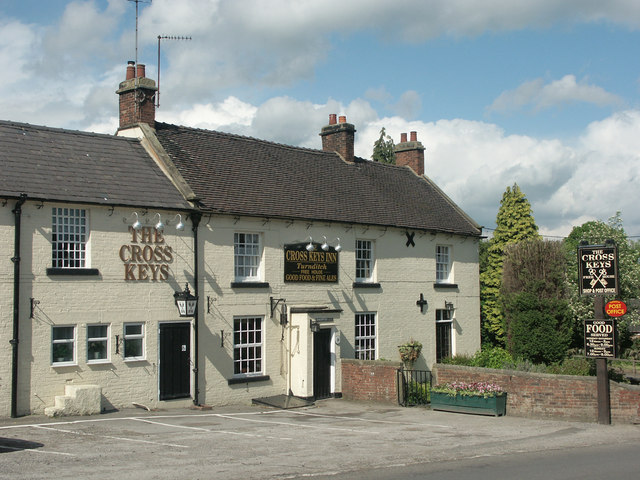
The Cross Keys pub is just South West of Cowers Lane

Cowers Lane is a settlement in Derbyshire bordering Shottle, within the civil parish of Shottle and Postern, near Belper, Derbyshire England along the A517 road. In Norman times, Shottle Park was one of the seven parks within Duffield Frith.

It was the site of a large shelter for cattle belonging to the Duchy of Lancaster who owned the Frith. It is generally believed that the name is the local dialect equivalent of "Cow House Lane".
