= Duffield Frith =

Coordinates: 53°2.77′N 1°33.15′W

Duffield Frith was, in medieval times, an area of Derbyshire in England, part of that bestowed upon Henry de Ferrers (or Ferrars) by King William, controlled from his seat at Duffield Castle. From 1266 it became part of the Duchy of Lancaster and from 1285 it was a Royal Forest with its own Forest Courts.

It extended from Duffield to Wirksworth and from Hulland to Heage. Most of it became the ancient parish of Duffield, which contained the townships of Hazlewood, Holbrook, Makeney and Milford, Shottle, and Windley, and the chapelries of Belper, Heage and Turnditch. The chapelry of Belper – or "Beaureper" – was built by the Duke of Lancaster for the use of the foresters.

The area had been noted for centuries for the quantity of deer, mostly fallow, but there was also wild boar. There were also wolves, at least until the end of the thirteenth century.

== Norman Conquest ==
Henry de Ferrers had been granted vast tracts of land, in present-day Buckinghamshire, Berkshire, Northamptonshire, and Essex and as far south as Wiltshire. In 1070 Hugh d'Avranches was promoted to become Earl of Chester and the Wapentake of Appletree, which covered a large part of south Derbyshire, was passed to de Ferrers. At the centre of this was Tutbury Castle which he adopted as his domestic headquarters.

His major landholdings, however, were those of the Anglo-Saxon Siward Barn, following a revolt in 1071, including more land in Berkshire and Essex and also Gloucestershire, Warwickshire, Nottinghamshire and Derbyshire. In addition to Tutbury Castle, he built two more, probably typical Norman timber motte and bailey construction. Remembering that large areas of the county were laid to waste during the so-called Harrying of the North, and are recorded as such in the Domesday Survey, Pilsbury Castle, on the west bank of the River Dove, was probably built to protect his holdings in the wapentake of Hamston. Meanwhile Duffield Castle commanded an important crossing over the River Derwent and oversaw the parts of the wapentakes of Litchurch and Morleyston, to the west of the river, and that part of his lands that would become the Frith. Much of the estate was granted to Knights who served under him, among them being the Curzons of Kedleston Hall.

== Forest Laws ==
It will be seen that the de Ferrers controlled an area between the rivers Derwent and Dove, from the River Trent at Tutbury north to the Forest of High Peak. It is not clear how much of this was retained specifically for hunting. Possibly around 1225, when the Forest of East Derbyshire was abolished, Morley Park, which included Belper, was added. In 1266, after a rebellion by Robert de Ferrars, against King Henry III the lands were confiscated and passed to Prince Edmund to be part of the Duchy of Lancaster.

Records for Duffield Frith do not begin until this time, and being part of the Duchy, the area was not properly a royal forest until the reign of Henry IV. However Edmund was allowed to hold Forest Courts for Duffield as part of the honour of Tutbury, and King Edward I hunted in between 1290 and 1293 and Edward II visited in 1323.

== Duchy of Lancaster ==
There were four wards: Duffield, Belper, Hulland and Colebrook. Within these were a number of enclosed parks for the keeping of buck and doe (in contrast with the much larger ward of Campana in the Forest of High Peak which was intended for hart and hind.)

There were seven of these parks within the Frith, listed by Henry Earl of Lancaster) in 1330 as : Ravensdale, Mansell, Schethull (Shottle), Postern, Bureper (Belper), Morley, and Schymynde-cliffe, (Shining Cliff). There was another park, Champain, on the southern border on what is now Cumberhills, south of Duffield, near Champion Farm.

The records of the Duchy of Lancaster have many references to Duffield Frith, including, in 1314, a great larder at Belper, where the venison of the deer was salted down for winter use, and a large cow-house stood in the lower part of Shottle (Cowhouse Lane, listed by the Post Office as "Cowers Lane").

It was a valuable source of timber. Orders are recorded, in 1375 for the delivery of oaks to the Carmelite Friars of Nottingham, the Dominican Friars of Derby, and the Abbot of Darley for building purposes. In September 1405, King Henry IV ordered the chief forester to supply twelve timber oaks towards the repair of Duffield church, and in 1411 to deliver to the tenants of Duffield enough wood for shoring Duffield Bridge (near the present Bridge Inn) while it was rebuilt – using, no doubt, stone from the ruins of the castle. Henry VIII decreed that certain crops should be grown such as flax in modern-day Flaxholme.

It should be remembered that, although referred to as forests, these areas were not necessarily woodland overall. However, in any case, no special measures were taken to conserve timber. By the Sixteenth century the forest laws had been relaxed and much of the land was considered as common. A shift had occurred from arable farming to livestock production and it was more profitable to rent the forest for grazing, without protecting the growing shoots of young trees. Meanwhile, the use of timber increased, particularly for iron and lead smelting which increased significantly from the Thirteenth century.

== Common land ==
Duffield Frith continued to be in the hands of the Crown until the time of Charles I. It had been reduced considerably in size, and in the reign of Elizabeth I it is said to have been thirty miles in circumference.

In 1581 a commission investigated ways in which extra royal revenues might be gained. By then Shining Cliff and the manor of Alderwasley had been transferred to the Lowe family, leaving the three wards of Duffield, Belper and Hulland. It reported that the game had virtually disappeared and much of the area was held in common by tenants and copyholders who would suffer if the woods were enclosed. They suggested developing the facilities for smelting the ores and a charge on lead similar to that levied in Wirksworth.

By this time the forest had been almost completely denuded. One effect of this was a move towards the use of coal. Water power was already used for grinding corn and wool fulling. It found increasing use for mechanising the various forms of mineral processing. In 1556, one of the earliest ore-stamping mills was built at Hulland Ward by Burchard Kranich, who, two years earlier, had built the first Smeltmill for extracting lead from its ore at Makeney.

Matters were left in abeyance until 1633, when the Frith ceased to be a royal forest. The Duchy of Lancaster assigned one third of Belper and Hulland to the Crown and rented to Sir Edward Sydenham. The remainder was divided and enclosed and passed to the commoners. When it came to Duffield Ward, however, the majority of the commoners opposed the proposal. Nevertheless, the Duchy council went ahead and selected the best areas for the Crown, particularly those that were rich in coal. Moreover, the areas assigned to the commoners were only granted to those who had previously agreed to the scheme.

This culminated in 1643 in the inhabitants forcibly throwing open all the enclosures in Duffield – or Chevin Ward, including Shottle Park. The commoners were about to seek a judicial review when the Civil War began, and all this part of the old forest so seized remained common until 1786, when 1,500 acres (6.1 km^{2}) were enclosed by Act of George III.

== Present day ==
Ravensdale Park, between Windley and Hulland, is today listed as a Scheduled Ancient Monument. Shining Cliff Wood is on long lease to the Forestry Commission and is listed as containing an SSSI. Having been excavated at the end of the nineteenth century, the castle at Duffield has been sadly neglected, since there is little to see.

A paper by Derbyshire County Council has suggested: The area of Duffield Frith is one within which, as noted above, there is good surviving evidence of medieval settlements and field systems. There are extensive documentary records for the forest and opportunity exists for research into the development of these settlements and the economy within a royal forest.
