= Shottle =

Village in Derbyshire, England

Coordinates: 53.044°N 1.537°W

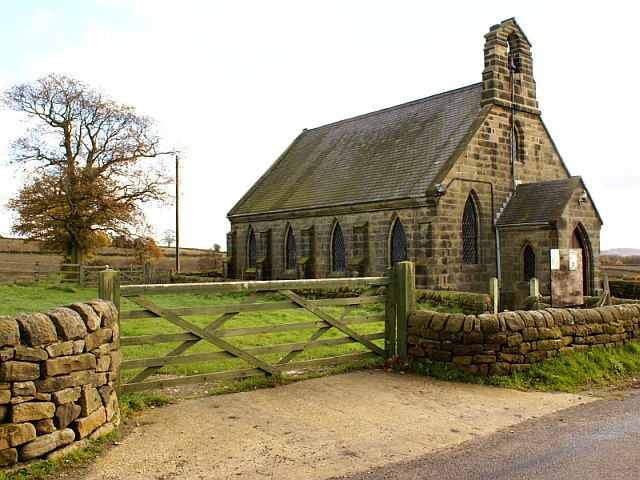
- St Lawrence Church, Shottle.

- Location within Derbyshire
- Population: 266 (201)
- OS grid reference: SK311497
- Civil parish: Shottle and Postern
- District: Amber Valley
- Shire county: Derbyshire
- Region: East Midlands
- Country: England
- Sovereign state: United Kingdom
- Post town: BELPER
- Postcode district: DE56
- Police: Derbyshire
- Fire: Derbyshire
- Ambulance: East Midlands

Shottle is a village approximately 3 miles (4.8 km) south of the market town of Wirksworth in Derbyshire. The population of the civil parish (Shottle and Postern) at the 2011 Census was 266.

In Norman times, the manor of Shottle, referred to as Sothille in the Domesday Survey, belonged to the Ferrers (Note: Henry de Ferrers held a considerable number of manors including a large number in Derbyshire given to him by the king, William the Conqueror. These included obviously Shottle, but also included Barrow upon Trent, Chellaston, Etwall, Hatton, Osmaston, Normanton, Derbyshire, Spondon and Swarkestone) family.

In 1086, the book notes that

"In Shottle and Wallstone Gamal had six carucates of land to the geld. There is land for as many ploughs. There are now one ploughs in demesne and three villans and three bordars having one ploughs and five acres of meadow. Woodland pasture 3 and a half leagues by one and a half leagues. (TRE worth ten shillings now ten shillings. Godric holds it"

Shottle Park was one of the seven parks within Duffield Frith. The gate at its south-east corner is still known as Shottle Gate. To the south was the much smaller Postern Park. The present-day parish is known as Shottle and Postern.

It was annexed to the Duchy of Lancaster after the rebellion by Robert de Ferrers, 6th Earl of Derby. It is thought to have passed to the Earl of Shrewsbury during the reign of Queen Elizabeth I. It was sold in 1630 by Philip, Earl of Pembroke and Montgomery, to Christian, the wife of William Cavendish, 2nd Earl of Devonshire.

Shottle is a rather straggling rural village spread out on the road from Shottlegate to Wirksworth via Alport Height (Chequer Lane). Its main industry was, and remains, agriculture. Shottle Hall dates from 1841 and is a pleasant building in the late Georgian style, now used mainly for weddings and events.

Whilst some way out of the village itself, Shottle has its own railway station – called Shottle after Shottle Hall, which is nearby. The station, which is on the Wirksworth Branch, was closed in 1947 to passengers and the building is owned by Peak Oil Ltd. The railway line has been reopened to passengers as the Ecclesbourne Valley Railway.

== See also ==
- Listed buildings in Shottle and Postern
