= Listed buildings in Hulland =

Hulland is a civil parish in the Derbyshire Dales district of Derbyshire, England. The parish contains nine listed buildings that are recorded in the National Heritage List for England. All the listed buildings are designated at Grade II, the lowest of the three grades, which is applied to "buildings of national importance and special interest". The parish contains the village of Hulland and the surrounding countryside, and the listed buildings consist of houses, cottages and associated structures, and a church.

== Buildings ==
| Name and location | Photograph | Date | Notes |
|---|---|---|---|
| Old Hall and outbuildings 53.01965°N 1.63719°W | — | Mid-17th century | The house, which was later refashioned, is in brick with stone dressings, quoins, and a tile roof with coped gables and kneelers. There are two storeys and attics, and an irregular plan. Most of the windows in the early part are mullioned. The later part has two gables, a central doorway with a segmental pediment, cross windows and casements. The outbuildings are to the west, and include a brick barn with a cart entrance. |
| Glovers and wall 53.01871°N 1.63459°W | | Late 18th century | The house is in gritstone with a tile roof, two storeys and six bays. The doorway has a bracketed hood, and the windows are casements. In front of the west part of the house is a stone wall enclosing the garden. |
| Hulland Hall; 53.01878°N 1.63555°W | — | 1777 | A rear wing was added to the house in the mid-19th century, which is in red brick with dentilled eaves, a parapet, and a tile roof. There are two storeys and attics, a front of three bays, the middle bay projecting, and a rear wing. On the front are French doors, and the windows are sashes with segmental heads on the front and flat heads elsewhere. The west front has a porch with latticework. |
| North stable block, Hulland Hall; 53.01907°N 1.63566°W | | Late 18th or early 19th century | The stable block is in red brick, and has a tile roof with coped gables. There are two storeys, and a central tower flanked by single-storey gabled wings. The tower has an embattled parapet and a wooden cupola, and the wings contain a mix of sash and casement windows. |
| Cottage and outbuilding 53.02793°N 1.63166°W | — | Early 19th century | The cottage and outbuilding are in brick with some gritstone, a decorated eaves course, and a tile roof. There are two storeys, the cottage has two bays, and the outbuilding has one. The doorway is in the centre, and the windows are sashes with flat rendered lintels. |
| The Green and outbuildings 53.01989°N 1.63599°W | | Early 19th century | The house is in brick, partly rendered, on a stone plinth, and has a tile roof with coped gables. There are two storeys and three bays. The central doorway has a fluted surround and a semicircular fanlight, and the windows are sashes with keystones. In front of the house is a garden enclosed by iron railings. To the right are older outbuildings in gritstone with alterations in brick that contain mullioned windows, a carriage arch, and a gabled dormer. |
| West stable block, Hulland Hall; 53.01905°N 1.63595°W | — | Early 19th century | The stable block is in brick with a tile roof and two storeys. In the ground floor are three doorways and three windows, all with segmental heads, and the upper floor contains six small rectangular windows. |
| Christ Church; 53.02353°N 1.62997°W | | 1838 | The chancel was added in 1861, followed the vestry in about 1870, and the chancel was extended in 1961. The church is built in gritstone with sandstone dressings, and consists of a nave, a chancel, a vestry, and a west tower with lancet windows and an embattled parapet. The east window has three lights with intersecting tracery, and the other windows contain Y-tracery. |
| Hulland Grange; 53.02591°N 1.62793°W | — | Mid-19th century | The farmhouse is rendered, and has overhanging eaves and a hipped slate roof. There are two storeys and a symmetrical front of three bays. The central doorway has raised pilasters, a rectangular fanlight and a raised lintel, and the windows are sashes. The lintels of the doorway and windows contain a diamond-shaped motif. |
