= Forest of East Derbyshire =

Coordinates: 53°01′27″N 1°28′53″W

The Forest of East Derbyshire was, in the Middle Ages, an area of wooded heath between the rivers Derwent and the Erewash in Derbyshire.

Unlike the Forest of High Peak and Duffield Frith it was not taken over by William I, but became a royal forest in the reign of Henry II. Stretching as it did over practically the whole length of the present-day county it was much larger than the other two. Bordering on Sherwood Forest, it made a continuous area stretching from the River Derwent to the Trent.

The custodians were the Cauz family of Laxton in Nottinghamshire, who had inherited it from Geoffrey Alselin who was related by marriage to Gerard de Normanville, who it is believed had been made custodian of Sherwood Forest by William I.

Matilda de Cauz had married Ralph fitzStephen, chamberlain to Henry II. On his death in 1202, King John seized the manor of Laxton and her custodianship of the forest, which were restored to her in 1217 after his death.

Custodianship of Sherwood Forest passed to John de Birkin, then to his son, and finally by marriage to Robert de Everingham. However, in 1225 East Derbyshire was disafforested. It may be about this time that William de Ferrers II extended Duffield Frith to the east of the River Derwent to build a new hunting lodge at Belper.
