= Hulland =

Village in Derbyshire, England

Coordinates: 53.020°N 1.635°W

- Location within Derbyshire
- OS grid reference: SK245470
- District: Derbyshire Dales
- Shire county: Derbyshire
- Region: East Midlands
- Country: England
- Sovereign state: United Kingdom
- Post town: ASHBOURNE
- Postcode district: DE6
- Police: Derbyshire
- Fire: Derbyshire
- Ambulance: East Midlands

Hulland is a village and civil parish in the Derbyshire Dales district of Derbyshire, England, adjoining the A517 road. It had a population of 215 according to the 2011 census.

In the 1870s Hulland was described as:

"Hulland, a village and two townships in Ashborne parish, and a chapelry partly also in Wirksworth parish, Derby. The village stands on an eminence, 5 miles E by N of Ashborne r. station; and has pleasant environs"

Hulland should be distinguished from Hulland Ward, an adjacent village and civil parish immediately to its east.

== Population ==
The population of Hulland has not changed much over the years, in 1881 the population was 202 and in 2011 the population was recorded at 215. The biggest change in population was between 1951 and 1961. Between these years the population dropped by 25. In 2011 The mean age of people in Hulland was 41.2 years of age and the median was 45 years of age. 28.8 percent of the population was aged 45 to 59 in 2011 This is much higher than the Derbyshire district average (23.2 percent), the east midlands average (20 percent)and the national average (19.4 percent). Also in 2011 15.8 percent was aged 30 to 44.

== History ==
Hulland parish was a sub parish of the Ashbourne registration district until 1901. Hulland was also an ancient township in Ashbourne parish however became a separate, modern civil parish in December 1886.

== Church ==
The Church of England parish church which is shared by Hulland and Hulland Ward is Christ Church. The church was built in 1838 and seats up to 273 people. The church was in the rural deanery of Ashbourne. The churchyard contains one Commonwealth war grave from World War One and one Commonwealth war grave from World War Two.

== Industry ==
In 1881 the majority of males in Hulland worked in agriculture (35) and one woman worked in agriculture. This was very common for most places in the UK in this era.

The 2001 census showed 83 people aged 16–74 were employed, this number rose to 105 in the 2011 census data.

In 2011 the census recorded six males from the ages of 16–74 working in agriculture and four women aged 16–74 working in agriculture. the 2011 census also showed 18 people 17.1% of the population work in manufacturing the number of people who worked in manufacturing in 2001 was also 18. This shows how Hulland much like many other places in the UK had a shift from agriculture to manufacturing when it comes to most worked jobs.

== Housing ==
In 1891 there were 50 houses in Hulland, between 1881 and 1931 the lowest recorded number of houses was 48 in the years 1891, 1921 and 1931 and the highest number of houses recorded was 52 in 1901. In the year 1951 there were 57 houses in Hulland and in 1961 there were 59. This was the start of growth as in 2001 the number of houses in Hulland rose to 69, and in 2011 there was 80 houses in Hulland.

== See also ==
- Listed buildings in Hulland
- Listed buildings in Hulland Ward
