= Listed buildings in Hulland Ward =

Hulland Ward is a civil parish in the Derbyshire Dales district of Derbyshire, England. The parish contains four listed buildings that are recorded in the National Heritage List for England. All the listed buildings are designated at Grade II, the lowest of the three grades, which is applied to "buildings of national importance and special interest". The parish contains the village of Hulland Ward and the surrounding countryside, and the listed buildings consist of two farmhouses, a chapel and a milepost.

== Buildings ==
| Name and location | Photograph | Date | Notes |
|---|---|---|---|
| Halter Devil Chapel Farmhouse; 53.00127°N 1.59852°W | | Late 17th century (probable) | The farmhouse, which was substantially rebuilt in the later 19th century, is in red brick with some gritstone, and has a tile roof. There are two storeys and a symmetrical front of two bays. In the centre is a doorway, and the windows are top-hung casements, all with basket-arched heads. |
| Halter Devil Chapel; 53.00124°N 1.59862°W | | 1723 | The chapel attached to the farmhouse is built in gritstone, with a rear brick wall, and a Welsh slate roof. It has a single storey, two bays, angle pilasters, and a tall coped parapet with ball finials. The central doorway has an eared architrave and a keystone, and is flanked by tall windows with segmental heads and keystones. There are two similar smaller windows in the left return. |
| Shuckton Manor Farmhouse; 52.99094°N 1.60407°W | | 1729 | The farmhouse is in red brick with a tile roof. There are two storeys and a T-shaped plan, consisting of a main range, a rear wing, and a later lean-to in the angle. In the centre is a doorway, the windows are sashes, and over the doorway is an inscribed and dated slate panel. Inside, there is an inglenook fireplace. |
| Milepost; 53.00436°N 1.58151°W | | Early 19th century | The milepost is on the west side of Muggintonlane End. It is in cast iron with a triangular plan and a gabled top plate. On the plate is the distance to London and the name of the parish, and on the sides are the distances to Hulland Ward and Derby. |
