= Forest of High Peak =

Royal forest in medieval Derbyshire, England

Coordinates: 53°22′18″N 1°53′07″W

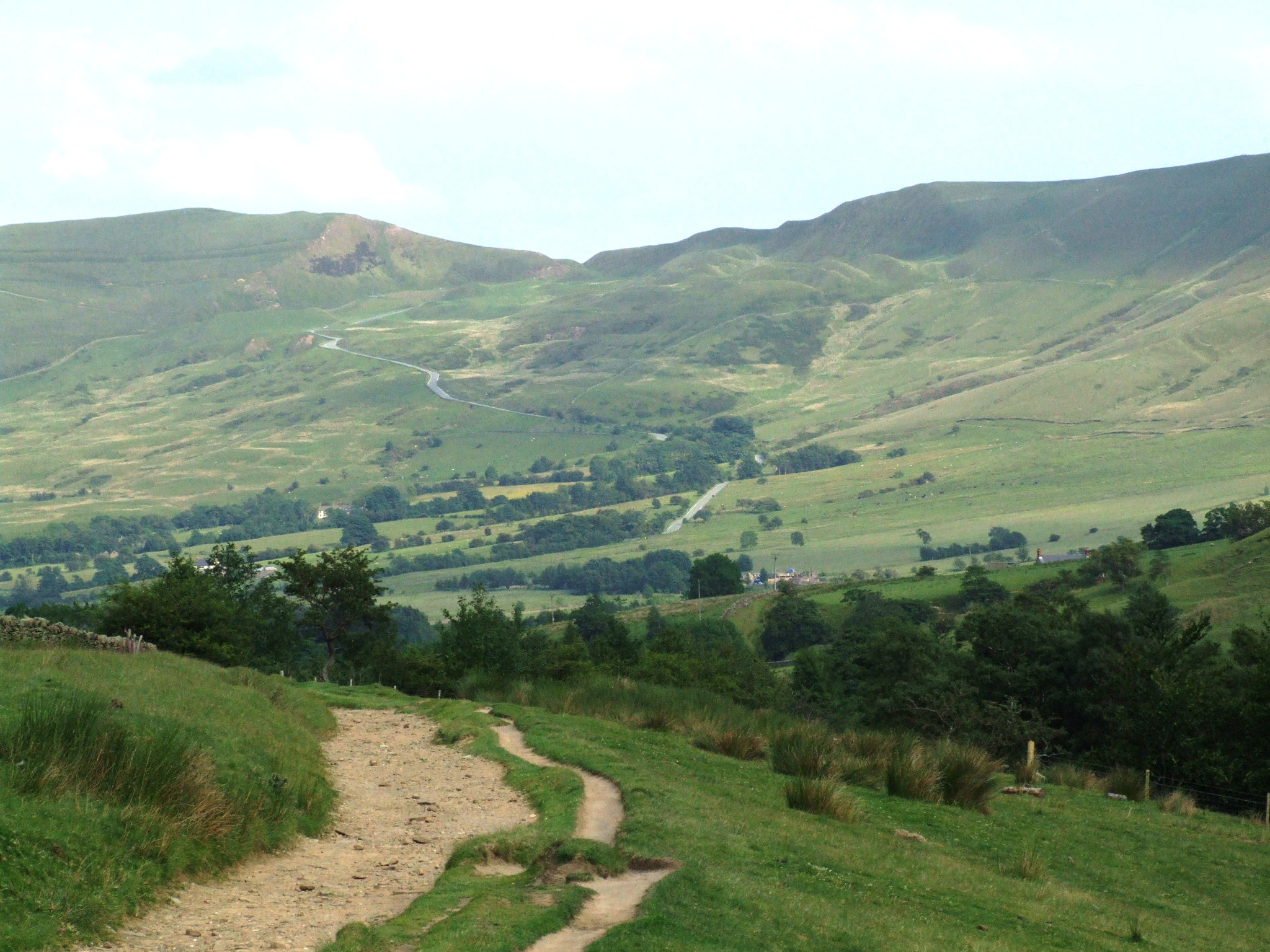
The Vale of Edale

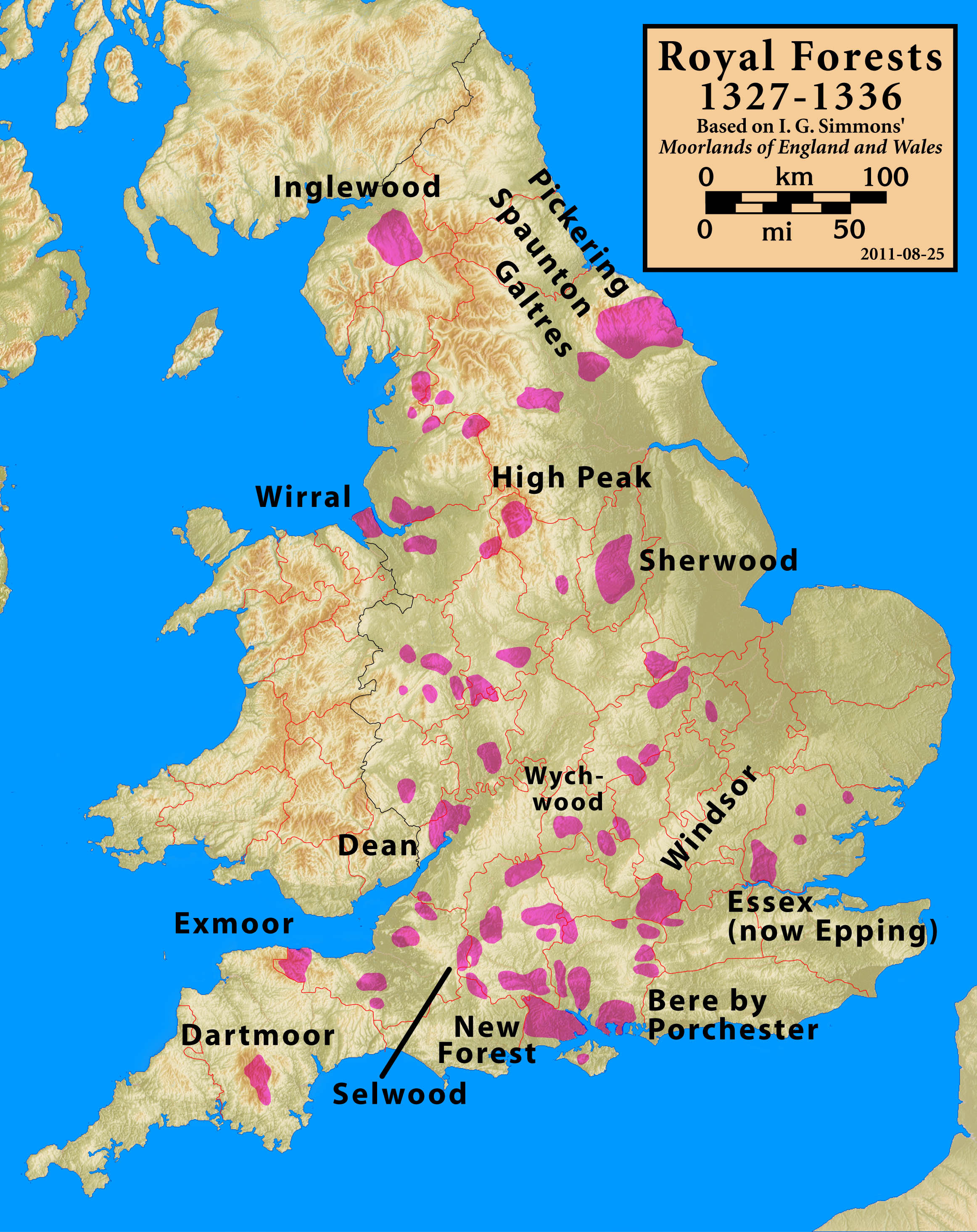

The Forest of High Peak was, in medieval times, a moorland forest covering most of the north west of Derbyshire, England, extending as far south as Tideswell and Buxton. From the time of the Norman Conquest it was established as a royal hunting reserve, administered by William Peverel, a follower of William I, who was based at Peveril Castle. The Royal Forest of Peak was bounded by the River Goyt to the west, the River Wye to the south, the River Derwent to the east and the River Etherow to the north. In 1305 it covered about 100 square miles.

The south western area between the River Wye and Kinder Scout was relatively open country, which was enclosed by a low wall, sufficient to keep out cattle and sheep but allow the deer to roam. The area was known as Campana, the other two being Hopedale and Longdendale. The point where they met is to this day marked by Edale Cross.

As well as his custodianship of the Forest, William also held a number of manors that formed part of what was recorded in the Domesday Survey as the Honour of Peverel. His son, also William, was granted a number of further manors, such that the Peverels could regard it as their demesne, apart from the manors of Muchedeswell and Tickhill which belonged to Henry de Ferrers.

However, in 1154 the estate was confiscated by King Henry II who rebuilt Peveril Castle in 1176. In 1189 Richard I gave the honour of the Peak to John the Count of Mortain. Later Edward II bestowed it briefly to his favourite Piers de Gaveston and then under Edward II it passed in 1345 to John de Warenne, Earl of Surrey. John died in 1347 and it passed to Edward's wife Philippa of Hainault. Finally in 1372 it was granted to John of Gaunt, 1st Duke of Lancaster. When his son Henry IV ascended the throne the Honour of the Peak passed to the crown along with all the other holdings of the Duchy of Lancaster, such as Duffield Frith. Subsequently, the manor and forest of High Peak were leased in perpetuity to the dukes of Devonshire.

Records document the deer, wild pigs, wolves, horses and sheep in the forest. Anyone caught breaking the laws of the forest was taken to the Peak Castle at Castleton, from where the High Steward administered the forest. The present village of Peak Forest is at the heart of the area of the old royal forest and was formerly known as Chamber of Campana. The nearby Chamber Farm or Chamber Knoll may have been the exact location of the residence and meeting place of local forest officials.
