= Windley =

Village in Derbyshire, England

Coordinates: 53.003°N 1.546°W

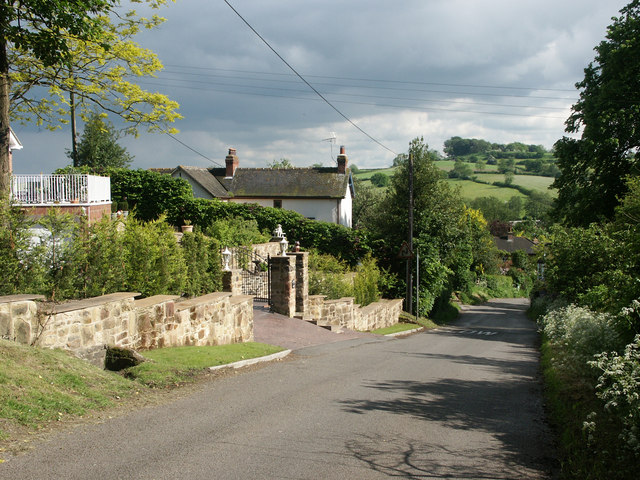

- Location within Derbyshire
- Population: 148 (2011)
- OS grid reference: SK305451
- District: Amber Valley
- Shire county: Derbyshire
- Region: East Midlands
- Country: England
- Sovereign state: United Kingdom
- Post town: BELPER
- Postcode district: DE56
- Police: Derbyshire
- Fire: Derbyshire
- Ambulance: East Midlands
- UK Parliament: Mid Derbyshire

Pronounced
(listen)

Windley is a small village and civil parish in Derbyshire, England, around 6 miles (10 km) north of Derby, adjacent to the B5023 Duffield to Wirksworth road. The civil parish population as taken at the 2011 Census was 148.

It was formerly part of the parish of Duffield within Duffield Frith.

During the reign of Henry III the Mynors, of the manor of Windle-hill in Sutton-on-the-Hill, Ashbourne also had lands in Windley.

Sir Roger Mynor was High Sheriff of Derbyshire in 1514, Sergeant of the King's Cellar, an official of Duffield Frith under the Duchy of Lancaster and a Commissioner of Peace for the County of Derby. He, with his lady, has a magnificent table-tomb in St. Alkmunds Church, Duffield.

== See also ==
- Listed buildings in Windley
