= Heywood railway station (Perrygrove Railway) =

Railway station in the UK

Coordinates: 51.78410°N 2.61181°W

Heywood railway station is a request stop on the 15 in (381 mm) gauge Perrygrove Railway. The line was opened in 1996 and is a heritage railway. There is a footpath into the woods around the line from the halt.

Preceding station	Heritage railways	Following station
Rookwood towards Perrygrove	Perrygrove Railway	Oakiron Terminus
