= Duffield War Memorial =

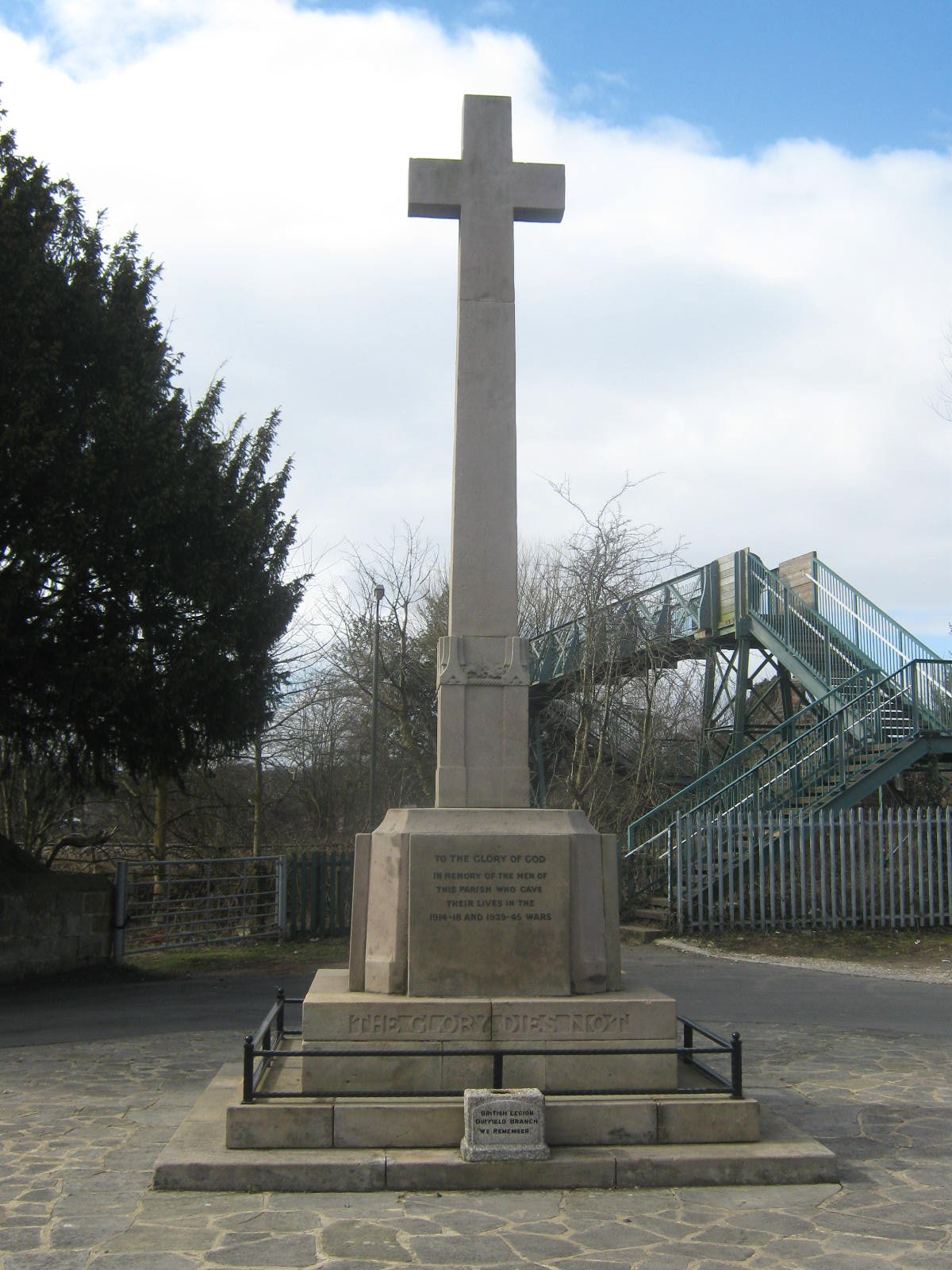
- Dufield War Memorial

- Location in Derbyshire
- 52°58′53″N 1°28′54″W
- Location: Duffield, Derbyshire, England

Listed Building – Grade II
- Official name: War Memorial
- Designated: 26 September 2018
- Reference no.: 1459469

Duffield War Memorial is a 20th-century grade II listed war memorial in Duffield, Derbyshire.

== History ==
The war memorial, which stands outside St Alkmund's church, was unveiled in 1921. It features the names of local residents that died during the First World War. The memorial was later renovated following World War II.

The memorial has been Grade II listed since 26 September 2018.

== See also ==
- Listed buildings in Duffield, Derbyshire
