= Rookwood railway station =

Railway station in the UK

Coordinates: 51.78494°N 2.61267°W

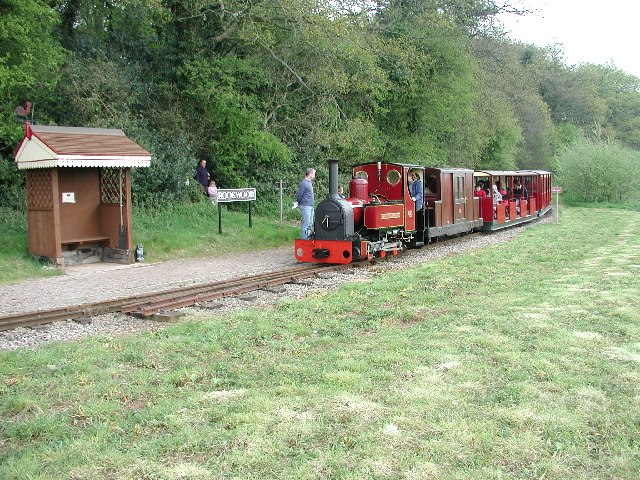
The Spirit of Adventure heads a train past the station

Rookwood railway station is a request stop on the 15 in (381 mm) gauge Perrygrove Railway. The railway was opened in 1996 and is a heritage railway. There is a footpath into the woods around the line from the halt.

A passing loop was laid in September 2011, allowing a 20-minute interval service at busy times. In July 2013 a siding was laid off the loop to allow access to a newly turfed area for "marquee" events.

Preceding station	Heritage railways	Following station
Perrygrove Terminus	Perrygrove Railway	Heywood towards Oakiron
