= Eaton Hall Railway =

Estate railway in Cheshire, England

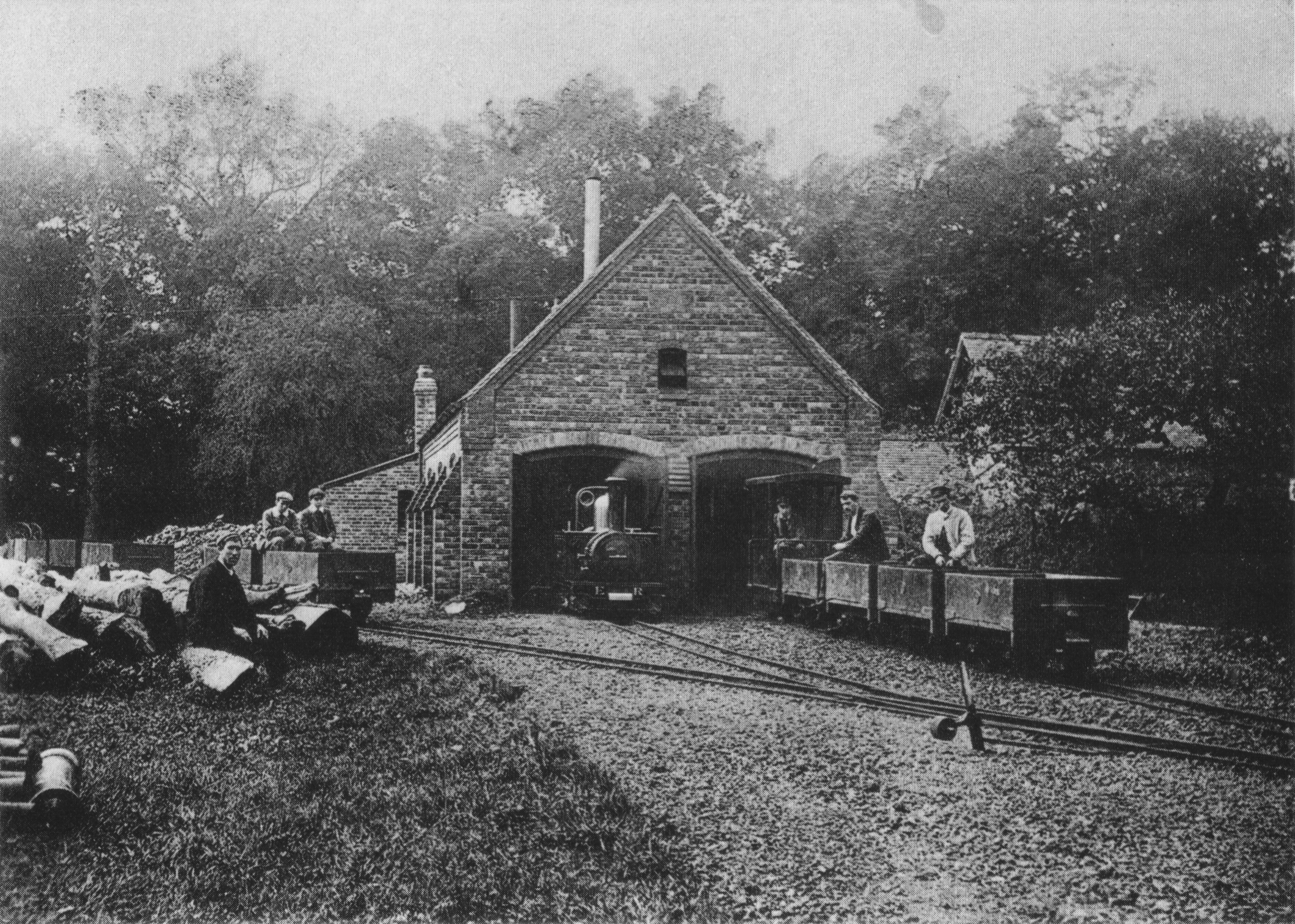
- The Belgrave engine shed on the Eaton Hall Railway c. 1898

Overview
- Headquarters: Eaton Hall
- Locale: England
- Dates of operation: 1896–1946

Technical
- Track gauge: 15 in (381 mm)
- Length: 4.5 miles (7.2 km)

The Eaton Hall Railway was an early 15 in (381 mm) gauge minimum-gauge estate railway built in 1896 at Eaton Hall in Cheshire. The line, which connected the Grosvenor estate with sidings at Balderton on the GWR Shrewsbury to Chester Line about 3 miles (4.8 km) away, opened in 1896. It was built for the Duke of Westminster by Sir Arthur Percival Heywood, who had pioneered the use of 15 in (381 mm) gauge with his Duffield Bank Railway at his house at Duffield, Derbyshire in 1874.

The narrow-gauge railway, which had about four and a half miles (7.2 km), was used mainly to bring deliveries of fuel to Eaton Hall. It had a branch to the estate brickworks at Cuckoo's Nest, Pulford. Other supplies were also transported to the main house and it sometimes carried passengers. The line closed in 1946 and was removed a year later. In 1994 a 15 in (381 mm) garden railway was installed at Eaton Hall; it is open when the estate is open to the public.

== Construction ==
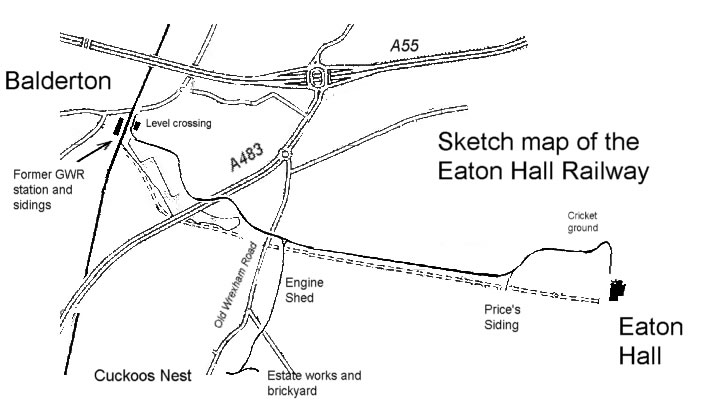
The Eaton Hall Railway network

The line was built on a surveyed course that followed the main driveway, across parkland, fields, and across two public highways. Across the Grosvenor estate, the railway was built to be as unobtrusive as possible by being laid level with the ground with a central drainage pipe beneath; however after leaving the park the line was embanked. Neither was the line fenced - where it crossed between fields it was carried on girders over a deep ditch to prevent cattle straying. Its used red furnace cinder for ballast which was 5 to 6 inches (127 to 152 mm) deep and 4 feet (121.92 cm) wide.

The track was steel flat-bottomed rail of 16.5 pounds per yard (8.2 kg/m), attached by spring clips to cast iron sleepers, 3 feet (0.91 m) long and 6.5 inches (165 mm) wide, spaced at 2-foot-3-inch (0.69 m) centres. Pointwork was prepared at the workshop in Duffield (for which Heywood charged £7/15s/0d each (equivalent to £1,133 in 2023)), and carried to site. The maximum gradient was 1 in 70 (1.43%), Eaton Hall being 51 feet (16 m) above the sidings at Balderton.

Bridges over one or two streams, the longest being 28 feet (8.5 m), but it crossed roadways on the level, at one point the main Wrexham to Chester road. Although Lord Heywood had obtained wayleave, it could only be a temporary arrangement because the Chester Corporation was not able to enter into a permanent agreement with a private railway. Heywood therefore campaigned for a clause in the proposed Light Railway Bill which would allow permission for public road crossings to be granted in perpetuity.

The railway opened in 1896. The four and a half miles (7.2 km) line included a branch to the brick store and estate workshop at Cuckoo's Nest at Pulford.

== Rolling stock ==
The first engine was "Katie", an 0-4-0T with Brown/Heywood valvegear (it had originally been intended to fit Stephenson/Howe valvegear). Following this were two identical 0-6-0T locomotives, "Shelagh" and "Ursula". Further details are given below. Katie proved capable of handling up to 40 long tons (40.6 t; 44.8 short tons) on the level, or 20 long tons (20.3 t; 22.4 short tons) on the gradient, at a speed of around 10 mph (16 km/h). Under test, 20 mph (32 km/h) was achieved in safety.

All rolling stock was built to negotiate curves of 25-foot (7.62 m) minimum radius. Self-acting coupler-buffers were fitted and measures were taken to ensure interchangeability of parts.

Thirty open wagons and a 4-wheeled brake van were initially provided, each wagon carrying about 16 long cwt (813 kg) of coal or 22 long cwt (1,118 kg) of bricks. The wagon 'tops' were removable to allow them to be used as flats, and bolster fittings were supplied to carry long items such as timber. An open 16 seat bogie coach, a bogie parcel van (for 'game') and a small open 4 wheeled brake 'van' were also provided at the opening. Finally, a closed bogie passenger vehicle, some 20 feet (6.10 m) long seating 12 people inside and four outside, a bogie brake van seating four inside and four outside were supplied after opening. Other wagons were constructed by the Eaton Estate and rebuilt over the years.

=== Locomotives ===
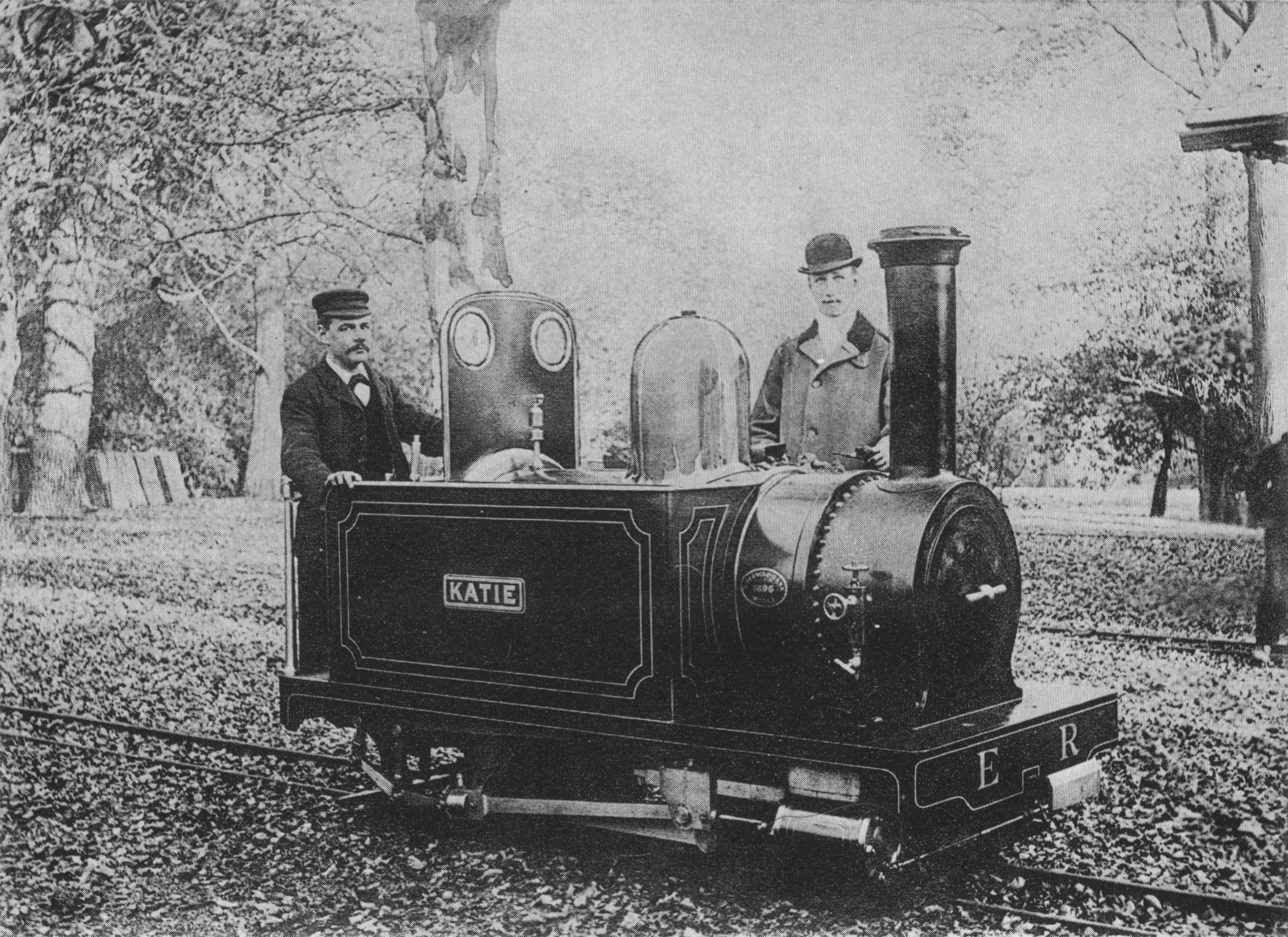
No 4 Katie, Eaton Hall Railway, 1896, Plate XV (Minimum Gauge Railways)

- 1896 Katie 0-4-0T
  - boiler 160 psi (1,100 kPa)
  - grate area 2.12 sq ft (0.197 m^{2})
  - heating surface 53 sq ft (4.9 m^{2})
  - cylinders 4.675 in × 7 in (118.75 mm × 177.80 mm)
  - wheel diameter 1 ft 3 in (0.38 m)
  - Brown/Heywood valve gear.

The original Katie was sold to the Ravenglass and Eskdale Railway in 1916, but was found to be too small for the railway's requirements and so was resold in 1919 to the Llewellyn Miniature Railway in Southport. In 1923 she was sold to the Fairbourne Miniature Railway where she operated trains until 1926 when she was withdrawn and dismantled. Her frames were later donated to the Narrow Gauge Railway Museum at Towyn, before being returned to Ravenglass. In 2018 Katie was returned to steam after a rebuild that lasted several decades. The engine is usually on display at the Ravenglass Railway Museum, although she is steamed regularly for special events throughout the year.

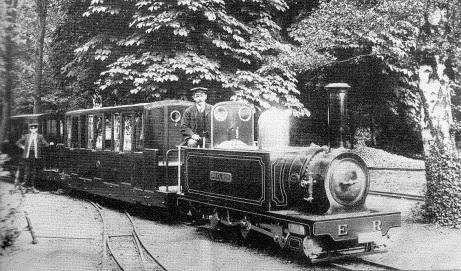
Shelagh, an 0-6-0T of Eaton Hall Railway in 1904

- 1904 Shelagh 0-6-0T
  - boiler 160 psi (1,100 kPa)
  - grate area 3 sq ft (0.28 m^{2})
  - heating surface 80 sq ft (7.4 m^{2})
  - cylinders 5.5 in × 8 in (139.7 mm × 203.2 mm)
  - wheel diameter 1 ft 4 in (0.41 m)
  - Brown/Heywood valve gear.
- 1916 Ursula 0-6-0T
  - as Shelagh

== Operation ==
Lord Heywood envisaged that the line could transport about 5,000 long tons (5,080 t; 5,600 short tons) per year. Freight would mainly be coal, timber, road metal and bricks. Heywood believed this to be perfectly adequate for a 15 in (381 mm) gauge of railway. One of Eaton Hall's fuel suppliers was the Chester fuel merchant Allan Morris & Co. It arranged for fuel supplies to be delivered in Standard-gauge waggons to Balderton sidings where the coal could be transferred into the line's narrow-gauge trucks.

== Closure ==
Eaton Hall railway closed in 1946 and was lifted in 1947. Sections of it were transported to the Romney, Hythe and Dymchurch Railway.

== Garden railway ==
A new 15 in (381 mm) railway, named the Eaton Park Railway was opened in 1994. Trains on the line are hauled by a 'replica Katie. It is not available for use by the public except on the various garden open days. The new line consists of a large loop with a spur leading to the engine shed. The latter section of track follows a small part of the original route.

== See also ==
- Fifteen-inch–gauge railway
