= Duffield Bank Railway =

Narrow-gauge railway in Derbyshire, England

Coordinates: 52.9830°N 1.4752°W

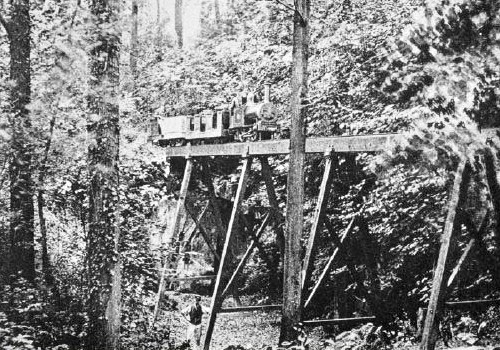

Overview
- Headquarters: Duffield
- Locale: England
- Dates of operation: 1874–1916
- Successor: Abandoned

Technical
- Track gauge: 15 in (381 mm)
- Length: 1 mile (1.6 km)

The Duffield Bank Railway was built by Sir Arthur Percival Heywood in the grounds of his house on a hillside overlooking Duffield, Derbyshire in 1874. Although the Ordnance Survey map circa 1880 does not show the railway itself, it does show two tunnels and two signal posts. However, the online map archive of the National Library of Scotland includes a map of 1914 from the 25 inches to the foot series (Derbyshire XLV.9 ) that shows the full extent of the railway.

== Overview ==
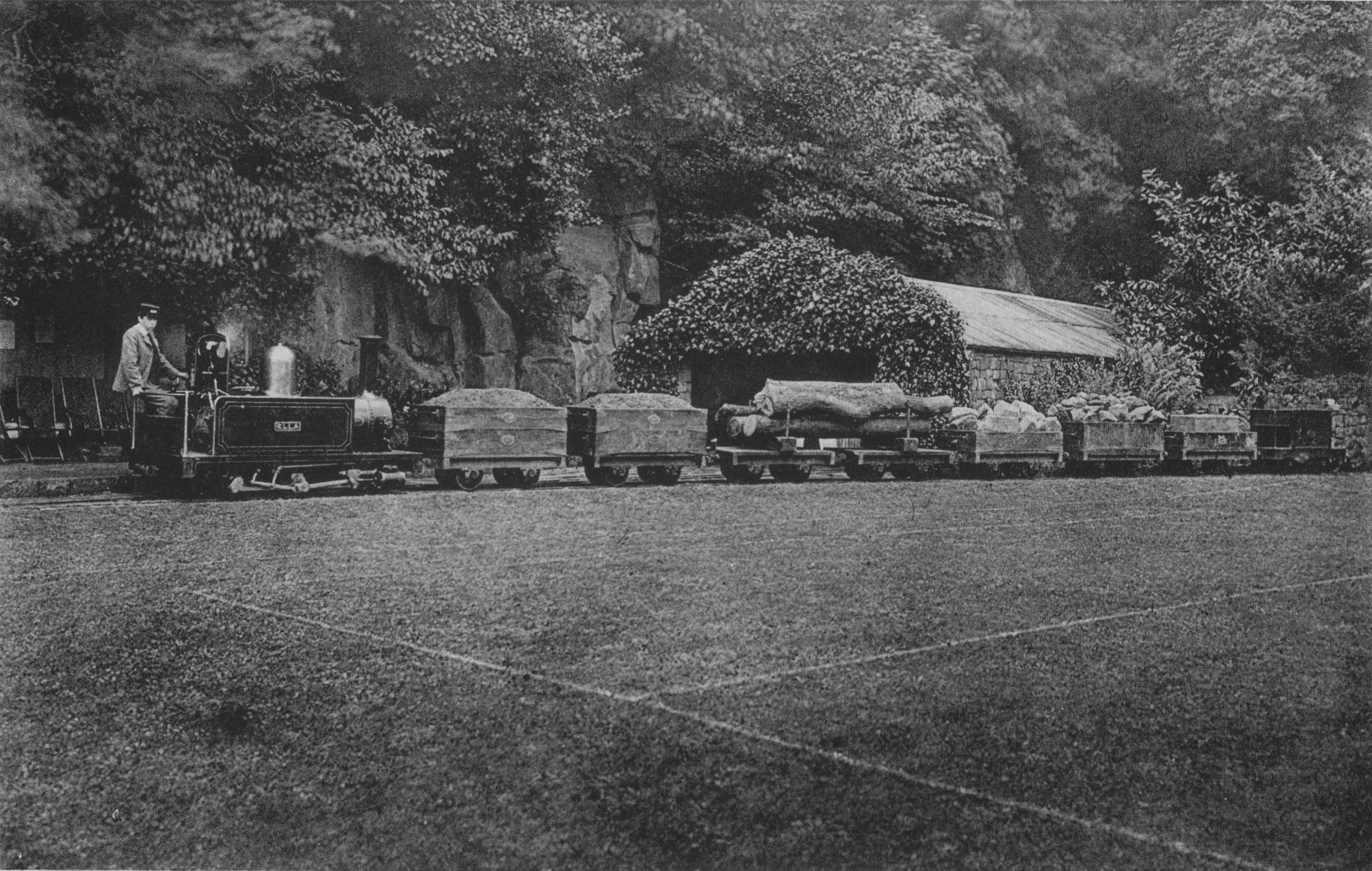
Engine No 2 Ella and goods train, Duffield Bank, Plate V (Minimum Gauge Railways)

Sir Arthur wished to explore the possibilities of minimum gauge railways for mining, quarrying, agriculture etc. He believed that they would be relatively easy to build, and to move. He saw possibilities for military railways behind the lines carrying ammunition and supplies. Some other small railways had been built to 2 ft gauge, but he wished to use the minimum that he felt was practical. Having previously built a small railway of 9 in (229 mm) gauge, he settled on 15 in (381 mm).

Duffield Bank is a fairly steep hillside to the east of the village. Over a period of about seven years, the track reached a distance of about one mile (1.6 km) long, with tunnels and some very sharp curves and steep gradients serving six stations. To demonstrate the versatility of such a line, he added both freight cars and passenger coaches, as well as a sleeping car with toilet and a diner with cooking compartment.

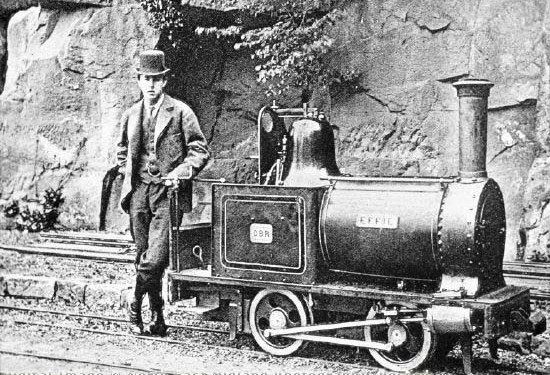
Effie

The first engine was an 0-4-0T "Effie" which was built simply to provide motive power for Sir Arthur's first experiments and did not represent a final design. Like his other locos, however, it used a boiler with a cylindrical "launch"-type firebox manufactured by Abbott and Company of Newark-on-Trent. Without the fire box projecting below the barrel, the over-hang of the frame was equalized at each end, without the use of trailing wheels, since he wished to concentrate the weight on the driving wheels. It also, he felt, had a low first cost with relatively easy maintenance. Such a system had already been used by Ramsbottom for some shunting engines for the London and North Western Railway, and worked well for engines which spent time standing. Although the grate area was proportional to the boiler heating surface, the firebox volume was small, and it was difficult to maintain a head of steam for an extended run. Nevertheless, he felt the benefit outweighed the disadvantages on this type of engine and used it for his later locos.

His next engine was an 0-6-0T "Ella", a six-coupled tank engine, with a larger boiler and firebox, working at a higher pressure. Because of the sharpness of the curves on his track, something he expected to be a feature of future constructions, he devised what he called his "radiating axles", foreshadowing the later Klien-Lindner and Luttermöller systems. The outside valvegear was similar to the Joy pattern, derived from Brown valve gear. A third engine "Muriel" was built to the same pattern as Ella, but eight-coupled and even larger.

Although he regularly demonstrated the line to entrepreneurs and the military, the only person to take an interest was the Duke of Westminster who asked him to build a line at Eaton Hall in Cheshire. The first engine on this the Eaton Hall Railway, was "Katie", an 0-4-0T but larger than Effie and using Brown/Heywood valve gear. Following this were two identical 0-6-0T locomotives, "Shelagh" and "Ursula".

Shortly after this, in 1916, Sir Arthur died, and the Duffield Bank system was closed. Most of the stock was acquired for the Ravenglass and Eskdale Railway which was in the process of gauge conversion. The Eaton Hall railway continued for a number of years, carrying timber and building materials around the estate, until it closed in 1947. None of Sir Arthur's lines now exist, but in recent years, enthusiasts such as the Heywood Collection, have recovered various items of interest.

Of the locomotives, only "Muriel" survives in heavily modified form working on the Ravenglass and Eskdale Railway as "River Irt" claiming to be the oldest surviving narrow gauge loco. However, parts of "Ella" survive in the Ravenglass & Eskdale Railway's 4-6-4 diesel locomotive "Shelagh of Eskdale". The line also is home to the remains of "Katie" (mainly the frames), which is currently being rebuilt.

The Perrygrove Railway in Gloucestershire was built with Sir Arthur's work very much in mind.

== Locomotives ==
=== Duffield Bank ===
- 1874 Effie 0-4-0T
  - boiler 125 psi (860 kPa)
  - grate area 1.25 sq ft (0.116 m^{2})
  - heating surface 23 sq ft (2.1 m^{2})
  - cylinders 4 in × 6 in (101.6 mm × 152.4 mm)
  - wheel diameter 1 ft 3 1/2 in (394 mm)
  - Stephenson valvegear.
- 1881 Ella 0-6-0T
  - boiler 160 psi (1,100 kPa)
  - grate area 2.12 sq ft (0.197 m^{2})
  - heating surface 70 sq ft (6.5 m^{2})
  - cylinders 4.875 in × 7 in (123.83 mm × 177.80 mm)
  - wheel diameter 1 ft 1 1/2 in (343 mm)
  - Brown/Heywood valve gear.
- 1894 Muriel 0-8-0T
  - boiler 160 psi (1,100 kPa)
  - grate area 3 sq ft (0.28 m^{2})
  - heating surface 91 sq ft (8.5 m^{2})
  - cylinders 6.25 in × 8 in (158.75 mm × 203.20 mm)
  - wheel diameter 1 ft 6 in (457 mm)
  - Brown/Heywood valve gear
  - weight 5 long tons (5.1 t; 5.6 short tons)

=== Eaton Hall ===
- 1896 Katie 0-4-0T
  - boiler 160 psi (1,100 kPa)
  - grate area 2.12 sq ft (0.197 m^{2})
  - heating surface 53 sq ft (4.9 m^{2})
  - cylinders 4.675 in × 7 in (118.75 mm × 177.80 mm)
  - wheel diameter 1 ft 3 in (381 mm)
  - Brown/Heywood valve gear.
- 1904 Shelagh 0-6-0T
  - boiler 160 psi (1,100 kPa)
  - grate area 3 sq ft (0.28 m^{2})
  - heating surface 80 sq ft (7.4 m^{2})
  - cylinders 5.5 in × 8 in (139.7 mm × 203.2 mm)
  - wheel diameter 1 ft 4 in (406 mm)
  - Brown/Heywood valve gear.
- 1916 Ursula 0-6-0T
  - as Shelagh

== Bibliography ==
- Clayton, H., (1968) The Duffield Bank and Eaton Railways, The Oakwood Press, X19, ISBN 0-85361-034-7
- Heywood, A.P., (1881) Minimum Gauge Railways, Derby : Bemrose, Republished (1974) by Turntable Enterprises, ISBN 0-902844-26-1
- Lowe, J.W., (1989) British Steam Locomotive Builders, Guild Publishing
- Smithers, Mark, (1995) Sir Arthur Heywood and the Fifteen Inch Gauge Railway, Plateway Press, ISBN 1-871980-22-4
