= Museum Langmatt =

Art museum in Baden, Switzerland

Coordinates: 47.4814°N 8.3077°E

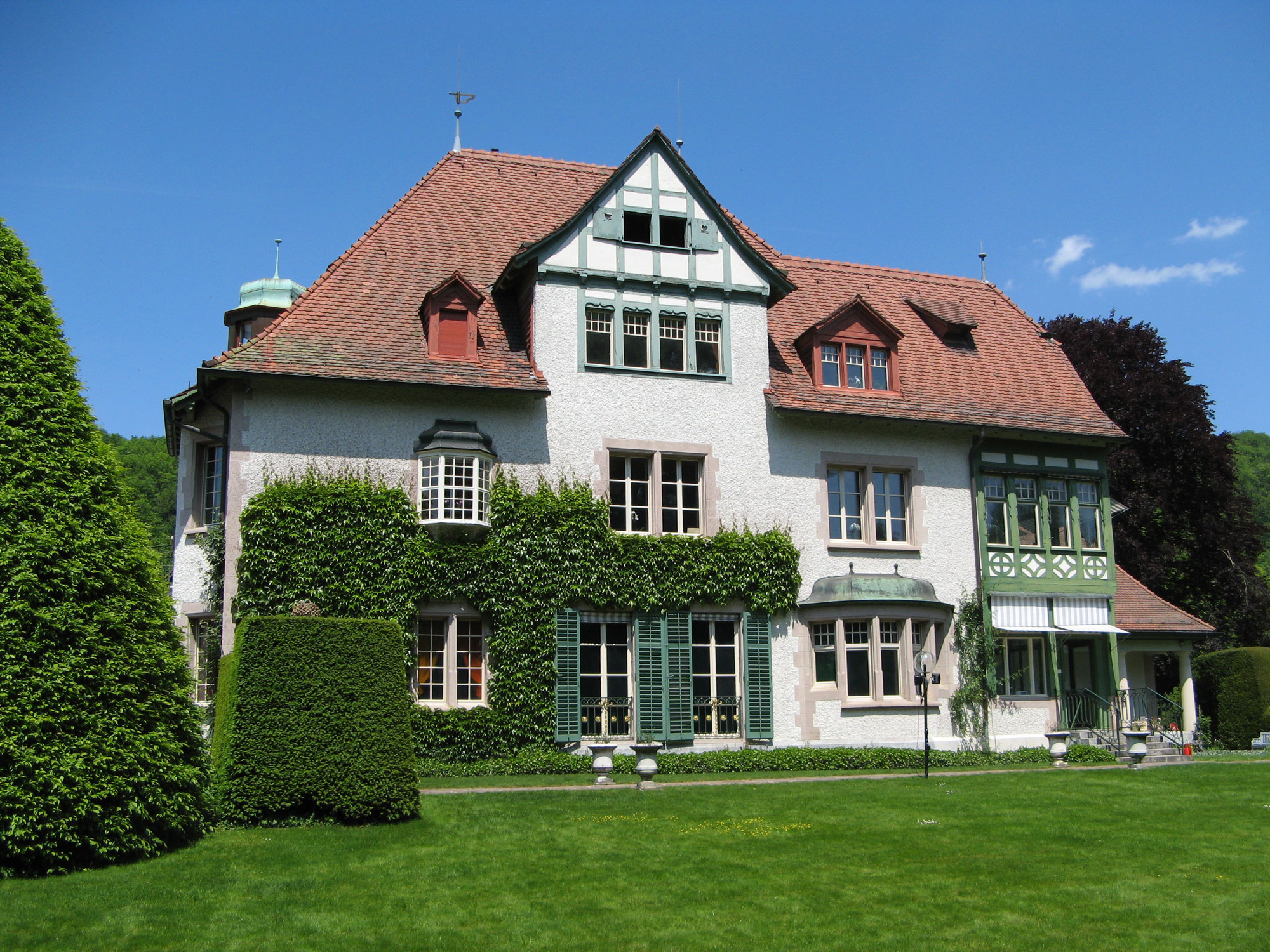
- View from Park
- Established: 1990; 36 years ago
- Location: Römerstrasse 30, Baden, Switzerland
- Collections: Brown Sulzer Collection
- Founder: Sidney Brown; Fanny Sulzer Brown
- Director: Markus Stegmann
- Website: langmatt.ch

Museum Langmatt (respectively Brown Sulzer Collection) is a Swiss art museum in Baden, Switzerland. The permanent collection was established by Sidney Brown and his wife Fanny Sulzer Brown, who were great collectors of French impressionism. The first painting acquired by the pair was Laundresses on the Banks of the Touques by Eugène Boudin in 1896. The collection currently includes but is not limited to art by Mary Cassatt, Paul Cézanne, Edgar Degas, Paul Gauguin, Claude Monet, Camille Pissarro, Pierre-Auguste Renoir and Alfred Sisley.

With all of the Brown sons without issue, the City of Baden, inherited the property and art collection in 1987. In 1988 the Langmatt Foundation (Langmatt Stiftung) was established and the house was opened as museum to the public in 1990. It is currently closed and is scheduled to reopen in spring of 2026 after extensive renovations.

== See also ==
- List of museums in Switzerland
