= Charles Eugene Lancelot Brown =

Swiss businessman and engineer (1863–1924)

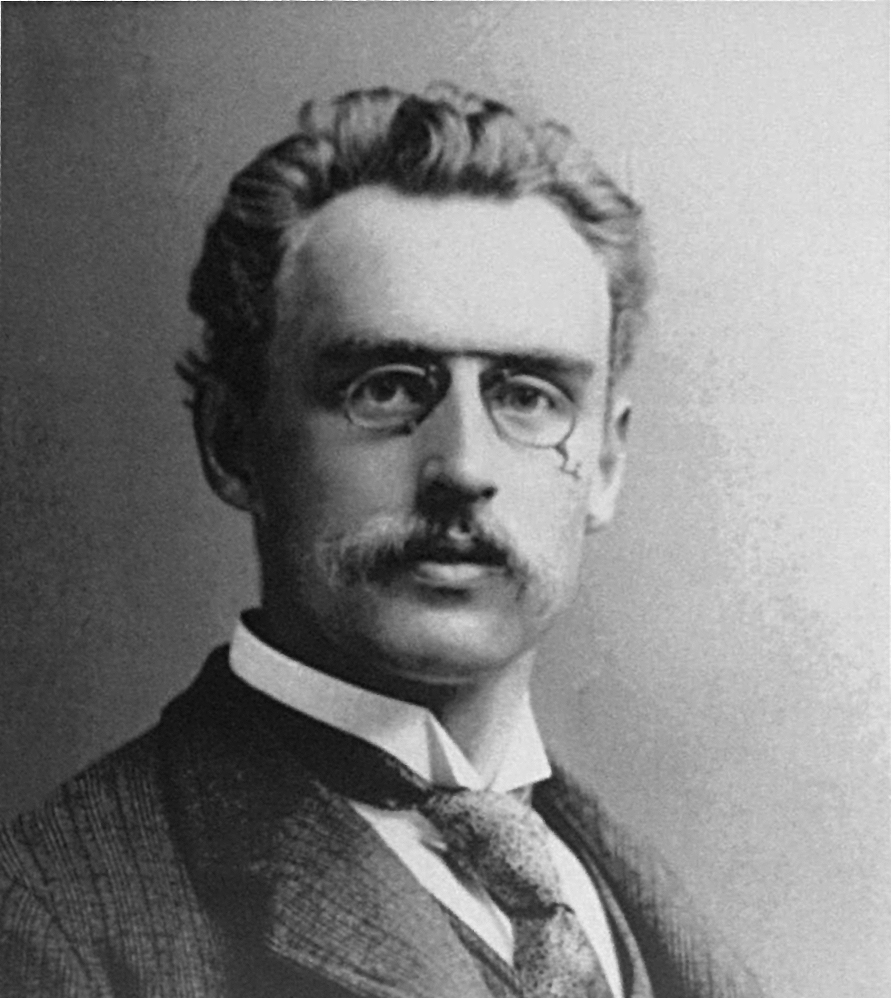
Brown c. 1900

Charles Eugene Lancelot Brown (17 June 1863 – 2 May 1924) was a Swiss businessman and engineer who co-founded Brown, Boveri & Cie (BBC), which later became ABB.

== Biography ==
Brown was born on 17 June 1863 in Winterthur, canton of Zürich, as one of six children. One of his brothers was the art collector Sidney Brown. His mother was Swiss and his father, British engineer Charles Brown (1827–1905), was the founder of Swiss Locomotive and Machine Works. He began working at Maschinenfabrik Oerlikon in 1884, where he headed the electrical engineering department from 1887 to 1891. In 1891, in collaboration with AEG, he succeeded in transmitting AC electric current over 175 kilometres (110 miles) for the International Electrotechnical Exhibition in Frankfurt, thus achieving a breakthrough in the field of alternating current, though he favoured the two-phase system.

In 1891, Brown co-founded with Walter Boveri the company Brown, Boveri & Cie in Baden, Switzerland. Over the following decade he acquired more than thirty Swiss patents for the company. After the transformation of Brown, Boveri & Cie into a S. A., Brown chaired the board of directors from 1901 until 1911, when he broke with Boveri, left the company and retired to Montagnola in the canton of Ticino. He died in Montagnola on 2 May 1924.
