= Perrygrove railway station =

Railway station in the UK

Coordinates: 51.78248°N 2.61105°W

Perrygrove railway station is the home of the 15 in (381 mm) gauge Perrygrove Railway. The railway was opened in 1996 and is a heritage railway. There is a run round loop, sidings, platform, picnic area, station building, parking, and engine shed located at the station. Guided tours are available of the shed if staff are available.

Preceding station	Heritage railways	Following station
Terminus	Perrygrove Railway	Rookwood towards Oakiron
