= Oakiron railway station =

Railway station in the UK

Coordinates: 51.7864°N 2.61020°W

Oakiron railway station is the terminus of the 15 in (381 mm) gauge Perrygrove Railway. The line was opened in 1996 and is now open as a heritage railway, passenger trains run round the train via the loop to couple on with the train back down to Perrygrove Station. The station consists of a small waiting shelter, a low platform, a loop and sidings. There are two footpaths from the station into the woods around the line. The line to Oakiron Quarry was near the site of today's sidings, the quarry line closed long before the railway.

Preceding station	Heritage railways	Following station
Heywood towards Perrygrove	Perrygrove Railway	Terminus
