= Sidney Brown (art collector) =

Swiss machine designer and art collector (1865–1941)

- Sidney W. Brown, c. 1940
- Born: Sidney William Brown; 7 April 1865; Winterthur, Switzerland
- Died: 1 August 1941 (aged 76); Baden, Switzerland
- Citizenship: Swiss (since 1916); British (1865–1916)
- Education: Technicum Winterthur
- Occupations: Industrialist, mechanical engineer, art collector
- Known for: Leading Brown, Boveri & Cie.; Founding the Brown Sulzer Collection
- Spouse: Fanny Sulzer (m. 1896)
- Children: 3
- Relatives: Sulzer family (by marriage)

Sidney William Brown (7 March 1865 — 1 August 1941) was a Swiss industrialist, engineer and art collector who was primarily known for his collection of French Impressionists such as Eugène Boudin, Paul Cézanne, Paul Gauguin, Camille Pissarro and Pierre-Auguste Renoir.

== Early life and education ==
Brown was born 7 March 1865 in Winterthur, Switzerland, the second of six children, to Charles Brown, a British engineer and inventor from Uxbridge, and Eugénie Brown (née Pfau; 1845–1924), originally from Winterthur. His older brother was Charles Eugene Lancelot Brown. His younger siblings were; Jane France Eugénie (born 1866), Ellen Kate Maude "Nelly" (1867–1940), Alice Katharina Eugénie (born 1868) and Julie Fanny Ida "Juliet" (1869–1943).

Until 1916, Brown held only British nationality, despite being born in Switzerland to a Swiss mother. He would ultimately naturalize with his Swiss-born wife and children by taking Swiss citizenship in Baden, Switzerland. He studied mechanical engineering at the Winterthur Technical College (Technikum Winterthur) and was one of the founding members of the Winterthur Velocipede Club during this time, of which he was the first president.

== Career ==
After his studies, he then joined his father in 1884 at what was to become Maschinenfabrik Oerlikon. After his brother founded the company Brown, Boveri & Cie. together with Walter Boveri in 1891, Sidney Brown became technical director there and later a member of the board of directors.

== Art collection ==
Their collection initially focused on painters of the Munich School such as Ludwig Herterich, Leo Putz and Franz von Stuck. Their villa Langmatt, built in Baden in 1901, received its own gallery extension for the painting collection in 1906. Until WWII, the Brown couple, advised by the painter Carl Montag, acquired paintings by the French Impressionists in Paris. The collection included paintings by Paul Cézanne, Paul Gauguin, Camille Pissarro, and Pierre-Auguste Renoir. They also acquired valuable furniture, porcelain, clocks, silver, and books. After the death of their son John A. Brown in 1987, the villa and its collections were placed in a foundation and have been open as a museum since 1990.

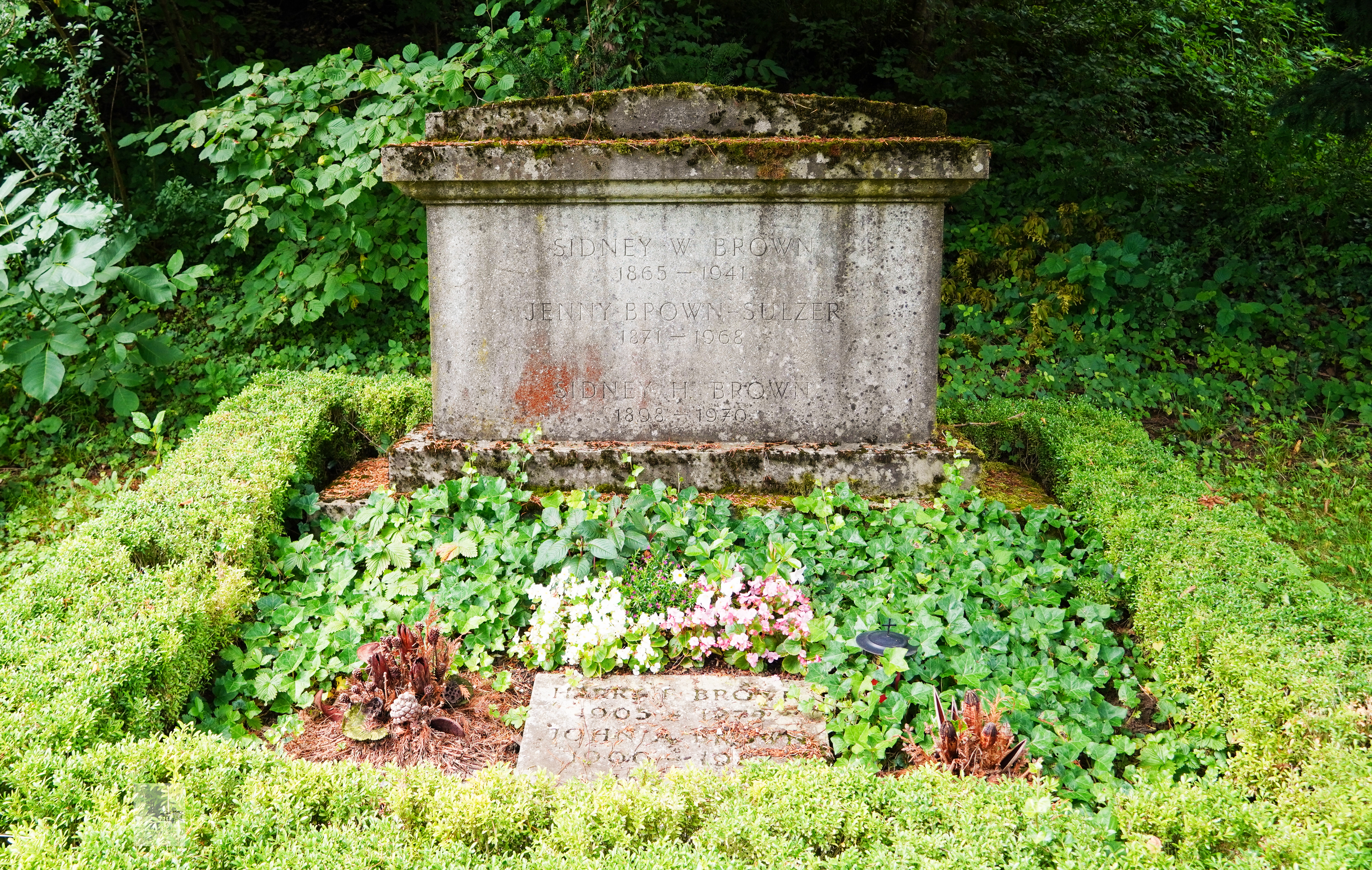
Family grave Brown-Sulzer

=== 2023 sale of Cézannes ===
In 2023 the Foundation sold three artworks by Cézanne at Christies. One of the Cézannes, entitled Fruits et pot de gingembre, was found to have been owned by a Jewish art collector who was persecuted by the Nazis. A confidential settlement was reached with the family of Jacob Goldschmidt shortly before the sale. However questions about the exact itinerary of the artwork remained

== Personal life ==
In 1896, Brown married Jenny Sulzer (1876–1968), a daughter of Jakob Heinrich Sulzer (1837–1906) and Bertha Luise Sulzer (née Steiner; 1841–1927). Their honeymoon took the couple to Paris, where they acquired Eugène Boudin's painting Laundresses. Her father was the president of Sulzer Brothers. They had three sons;

- Sidney Hamlet Brown (1898–1970), never married with no children.
- John Alfred Brown (1900–1987), never married with no children.
- Harry Frank Brown (1905–1972), married Andrée Marthe Müller, in 1969 after being in a long relationship, which resulted in no children. He resided at the parental home until his death. Upon his estate settlement the Museum Langmatt (officially Stiftung Langmatt Sidney und Fanny Brown) was established and opened to the public for the first time in 1990.

Brown died on 1 August 1941, the Swiss National Day, at the Langmatt Estate in Baden, Switzerland, aged 76. He was buried in the family grave at Liebenfels cemetery in Baden.

== Honors ==
- 1916 Honorary Citizen of Baden
- 1930 Honorary Doctorate of ETH Zurich

== See also ==
Bernheim-Jeune

== Literature ==
- "Brown, Sidney William" in German, French and Italian in the online Historical Dictionary of Switzerland.
- Norbert Lang: Charles E. L. Brown und Walter Boveri. Gründer eines Weltunternehmens. Verein für wirtschaftshistorische Studien, 1992, ISBN 3909059015.
- Florens Deuchler: Die französischen Impressionisten und ihre Vorläufer. Katalog Langmatt, 1990, ISBN 3855450447.
- Eva-Maria Preiswerk-Lösel: Ein Haus für die Impressionisten – Das Museum Langmatt. Hatje Cantz Verlag, 2001, ISBN 3775710175.
- Meet the Browns. Badener Neujahrsblätter 2012. Herausgegeben von der Literarischen Gesellschaft Baden und der Vereinigung für Heimatkunde des Bezirks Baden. Hier + Jetzt, Verlag für Kultur und Geschichte, Baden 2011.
