= John Bannister (philologist) =

English philologist

John Bannister, LL.D. (1816–1873) was an English philologist.

== Life ==
Bannister was the son of David Bannister, by his wife Elizabeth Greensides. He was born at York on 25 February 1816, and educated at Trinity College, Dublin (B.A., 1844; M.A., 1853; LL.B. and LL.D., 1866). He was curate of Longford, Derbyshire, 1844–5, and perpetual curate of Bridgehill, Duffield, Derbyshire, from 1846 till 1857, when he was appointed perpetual curate of St. Day, Cornwall, where he died on 30 August 1873.

== Works ==
He was the author of:

- 'Jews in Cornwall,’ Truro, 1867, reprinted from the Journal of the Royal Institution of Cornwall.
- 'A Glossary of Cornish Names, ancient and modern, local, family, personal, &c.: 20,000 Celtic and other names now or formerly in use in Cornwall; with derivations and significations, for the most part conjectural, suggestive and tentative of many, and lists of unexplained names about which information is solicited,’ London, 1869–71. This work was brought out in seven parts.
- 'Gerlever Cernouak, a vocabulary of the ancient Cornish language,’ Egerton MS. 2328.
- 'English-Cornish Dictionary,’ a copy of Johnson's Dictionary, interleaved, with Cornish and other equivalents, Egerton MS. 2329.
- 'Cornish Vocabulary,’ being copious additions by Bannister to his printed work, Egerton MS. 2330.
- Materials for a Glossary of Cornish Names, Egerton MS. 2331.
