= Listed buildings in Duffield, Derbyshire =

Duffield is a civil parish in the Amber Valley district of Derbyshire, England. The parish contains 40 listed buildings that are recorded in the National Heritage List for England. Of these, one is listed at Grade I, the highest of the three grades, one is at Grade II*, the middle grade, and the others are at Grade II, the lowest grade. The parish contains the village of Duffield and the surrounding area. Most of the listed buildings are houses, cottages and associated structures. The other listed buildings include churches and chapels, bridges, mileposts, buildings in Duffield Cemetery, and a war memorial.

== Key ==
Grade	Criteria
I	Buildings of exceptional interest, sometimes considered to be internationally important
II*	Particularly important buildings of more than special interest
II	Buildings of national importance and special interest

== Buildings ==
Name and location	Photograph	Date	Notes	Grade
St Alkmund's Church; 52.98115°N 1.48090°W		Early 14th century	The church, which has been altered and extended through the centuries, was restored in 1846–47 by J. P. St Aubyn, and in 1896–97 by J. Oldrid Scott. It is built in sandstone with a Welsh slate roof, and consists of a nave, north and south aisles, an outer south aisle chapel, a south porch, a north transept, a chancel with a north vestry, and a west steeple. The steeple has a tower with four stages, chamfered string courses, angle buttresses, and a west doorway with a moulded surround, above which is a two-light window and a clock face. The bell openings have two lights and Y-tracery, over which is an embattled parapet, and a recessed octagonal spire with a weathercock of 1719.	I
Duffield Hall; 52.98341°N 1.48715°W		c. 1640	A country house that has been altered and used for other purposes. It is in sandstone on a chamfered plinth, with moulded bands, and a tile roof with moulded gable copings, plain kneelers, and moulded finials. There are three storeys, and an east front with five gables. On the front is a porch that has a Tudor arch with carved spandrels, and a parapet with a frieze of quatrefoils and a coat of arms. To the left is a large polygonal bay window with a quatrefoil frieze, and most of the windows are cross windows.	II*
Duffield Church Bridge; 52.98290°N 1.47961°W		16th century (probable)	The bridge, which was widened in about 1803, carries Makaney Roasd over the River Derwent. It is in sandstone, and consists of three segmental pointed double-chamfered arches. The bridge has triangular cutwaters and a parapet with plain coping.	II
34 Town Street; 52.98625°N 1.48790°W	—	17th century	A house that has been altered and extended, it is in sandstone, partly rendered, with dressings in brick and sandstone, on a chamfered plinth, with a roof of Welsh slate and tile. The main block has two storeys and attics, and three gabled bays, to the left is a two-bay two-storey extension, and at the rear is a wing of 1893. The doorway has a moulded surround and side lights. Most of the windows are tripartite sashes, and there are small windows in the gables and above the door. The extension has sash windows in moulded architraves, a sill band, and a parapet.	II
Crow Trees; 52.98169°N 1.48630°W	—	17th century	The house, which was refronted in the 18th century and extended in the 19th century, is in red brick and gritstone, with gritstone dressings, quoins, a floor band, and tile roofs with chamfered gable copings and plain kneelers. There are three storeys, three bays, and flanking two-storey wings. The central doorway has a moulded surround, and the windows are sashes in moulded architraves.	II
Tamworth House; 52.98742°N 1.48962°W	—	1724	The house is in gritstone on a chamfered plinth, with rusticated pilasters, a moulded cornice, a blocking course, and coped parapets with corner acroteria. There are two blocks, each with three bays, the right block with three storeys, and the left block with two. In the left block is a doorway with a moulded surround, and the windows are sashes in moulded architraves.	II
43 and 45 Tamworth Street; 52.98786°N 1.49036°W	—	Early 18th century	A pair of red brick houses, partly rendered, with a floor band, a dentilled eaves cornice, and a tile roof with coped gables and plain kneelers. There are two storeys and five bays. The doorways have segmental heads, and the windows are casements, in the ground floor with segmental heads, and with flat heads in the upper floor.	II
The Park; 52.98676°N 1.48972°W	—	Early 18th century	A small country house that has been converted into flats. It is in gritstone and has hipped Welsh slate roofs. There are two blocks, the earlier block with three storeys and seven bays, a sill band and a cornice. In the centre is a Doric porch with a cornice and an open balustrade. The windows are sashes, those in the lower two floors in moulded architraves. The later block to the left has two storeys and three bays, and contains sash windows.	II
8 and 10 Tamworth Street; 52.98794°N 1.48990°W	—	Mid 18th century	A house, later divided, in red brick, on a chamfered plinth, that has decorative floor bands with a dentilled motif, and a tile roof with coped gables and plain kneelers. There are three storeys and a symmetrical front of three bays. In the centre is a doorway, and the windows are sashes, all with flat heads.	II
52 Town Street; 52.98525°N 1.48744°W	—	Mid 18th century	The house is in red brick with painted stone dressings, on a chamfered stone plinth, with sill bands, a dentilled eaves cornice and a Welsh slate roof. There are three storeys and three bays. The doorway has a moulded surround, to the right is a casement window with a segmental head, and to the left is a three-storey canted bay window. In the left bay is a broad rusticated elliptical carriage arch. The other windows in the middle floor have segmental arches, and those in the top floor have flat heads.	II
Duffieldbank House; 52.98659°N 1.47831°W	—	Mid 18th century	The house is in red brick with sandstone dressings, quoins, and a Welsh slate roof with coped gables and plain kneelers. There are three storeys, a main block with a west front of three bays, and two bays to the left, both recessed. The middle bay of the main block projects and contains a doorway with a moulded surround. The windows are sashes with moulded surrounds, some with segmental heads. On the south front is a canted bay window.	II
The Mews; 52.98555°N 1.48795°W	—	18th century	The house, which was refronted in the early 19th century, is in red brick and sandstone, with stone dressings, sill bands, an eaves band, and a tile roof with coped gables. There are three storeys, an L-shaped plan, and a north front of two bays. The left bay contains a segmental carriage arch with stepped moulding, and to its right is a doorway with a moulded round arch. The windows are sashes, those in the ground and middle floor with channelled lintels and stepped keystones.	II
The Old House; 52.98189°N 1.48534°W	—	Mid 18th century	A gritstone house that has a tile roof with coped gables and plain kneelers. There are two storeys, a symmetrical front of three bays, and a lower rear range. In the centre is a doorway, and the windows are mullioned with two lights.	II
The Ferns; 52.98503°N 1.48735°W	—	1756	The house is in red brick with sandstone dressings on a chamfered plinth, with quoins, sill bands, a dentilled eaves cornice, a coped parapet, and a Welsh slate roof. There are three storeys and a front of three bays, the middle bay projecting under a dentilled pediment. The central doorway is in Venetian style with a moulded surround and a keystone, and there is a doorway to the left with a basket arch and a rusticated surround. The windows are sashes with channelled lintels and stepped keystones.	II
Gervase House; 52.98546°N 1.48753°W	—	c. 1775	A house, later divided, in red brick with sandstone dressings on a stone plinth, with quoins sill bands, a dentilled eaves cornice, a blocking course, and a Welsh slate roof. There are three storeys and a symmetrical front of three bays, the middle bay projecting under a pediment. The central doorway has pilasters, a semicircular traceried fanlight and a pediment. The windows are sashes with Doric pilasters, decorated lintels, and dentilled cornices; those in the outer bays are tripartite.	II
36 Tamworth Street; 52.98810°N 1.49126°W	—	Late 18th century	The house is in red brick and sandstone, and it has a tile roof with coped gables and plain kneelers. The front is in brick and has three storeys and two bays. In the centre is a doorway with a bracketed hood, and to its left is a three-light casement window. All the other windows have wedge lintels; those in the ground and middle floor are casements, and in the top floor they are sashes.	II
Duffield Bank Cottage; 52.98636°N 1.47675°W	—	Late 18th century	The house is in gritstone, and has a tile roof with coped gables. There are two storeys and three bays. The doorway has massive quoins, and the windows are casements, those in the right bay with two lights and mullions.	II
Gate piers, St Alkmund's Church; 52.98134°N 1.48149°W		Late 18th century	The gate piers at the entrance to the churchyard are in gritstone. They have a square plan, and each pier has a moulded base and cap, and a massive ball finial.	II
The Cedars; 52.98191°N 1.48584°W	—	Late 18th century	A roughcast house that has a Welsh slate roof with coped gables and plain kneelers, and a parapet to the north. There are two storeys and attics, and an irregular front of four bays. On the front is a two-storey canted bay window with a hipped roof, a two-storey flat-roofed porch, French windows, and a single-storey bay window. The windows are sashes, and there are two hipped roof dormers.	II
Pair of garages, The Meadows; 52.98463°N 1.48676°W	—	Late 18th century	A coach house converted into garages, it is in red brick with sandstone dressings, a floor band, and a Welsh slate roof with coped gables and plain kneelers. There is a single storey and a loft, and two bays. On the front are two semicircular arches with moulded surrounds and inserted garage doors.	II
The Meadows; 52.98450°N 1.48671°W		1798	A house in red brick with sandstone dressings, floor bands, a dentilled eaves cornice and blocking course, and a Welsh slate roof, hipped to the west, and gabled to the east with copings and plain kneelers. There are three storeys and three bays, the middle bay slightly projecting. Between the bays are full-height recessed semicircular-headed arches, moulded at the top with imposts and keystones. The central doorway has pilasters, a semicircular traceried fanlight and a pediment. The windows are sashes, those in the lower two floors with channelled lintels and keystones. In the right return is a canted bay window.	II
7 Chapel Street; 52.98792°N 1.48719°W	—	Early 19th century	The house is in gritstone with a Welsh slate roof, two storeys and two bays. The central doorway has a segmental head, a fanlight with Gothic glazing, and a moulded cornice. To its left is a canted bay window, and the other windows are sashes.	II
1–29 King Street; 52.98814°N 1.48896°W	—	Early 19th century	A terrace of 15 workers' cottages in gritstone with tile roofs and two storeys. No. 29 has two bays, and the other cottages have one bay each. The windows are a mix of sashes, casements, and later replacements, and there are two oriel windows.	II
Gatehouse and wall, Duffield Hall; 52.98404°N 1.48684°W	—	Early 19th century	The gatehouse, later used for other purposes, is in red brick and sandstone, with quoins, a moulded eaves cornice, and a tile roof with coped gables and plain kneelers. There are two storeys and an L-shaped plan. The west front has three bays, the right bay gabled. In the centre is an elliptical carriage arch with voussoirs, above which is a round-arched window with an impost and keystone. The windows on this front are mullioned, on the south front are sash windows, and there are casement windows in the east front. In front of the building are stone walls.	II
Farnah House; 52.98387°N 1.51068°W	—	Early 19th century	A farmhouse in red brick, with a moulded eaves cornice, and a hipped Welsh slate roof. There are two storeys and three bays. In the centre is a Tuscan Doric doorway with a pediment, and the windows are sashes with channelled lintels and stepped keystones.	II
Greystones; 52.98536°N 1.48747°W	—	Early 19th century	A sandstone house with a moulded eaves cornice, and a Welsh slate roof with a coped gable to the south. There are two storeys and three bays. In the outer bays are round-arched doorways with fanlights, between them is a tripartite sash window, and in the upper floor are three sash windows.	II
Milepost at OS 336 432; 52.98482°N 1.50187°W		Early 19th century	The milepost is on the south side of Wirksworth Road (B5023 road). It is in cast iron, with a triangular plan and a segmental-headed top. On the top is inscribed the distance to London, and on the sides are the distances to Wirksworth and Derby, and the name of the manufacturer.	II
Milepost at OS 346 427; 52.98115°N 1.48714°W		Early 19th century	The milepost is on the west side of Derby Road (A6 road). It is in cast iron, and has a circular plan with a cylindrical shaft, a broader upper part, and a domed top. It is inscribed with the distance to Derby and the maker's name.	II
Milepost at OS 350 413; 52.96818°N 1.48018°W		Early 19th century	The milepost is on the southwest side of Derby Road (A6 road). It is in cast iron, and has a circular plan with a cylindrical shaft, a broader upper part, and a domed top. It is inscribed with the distances to Derby and Duffield, and the maker's name.	II
Mill House; 52.98781°N 1.49123°W	—	Early 19th century	The house is in gritstone, with an eaves cornice, and a Welsh slate roof with coped gables and moulded kneelers. There are two storeys and four bays. The doorway has a round-arched head, a blind fanlight, impost blocks, and a keystone., and the windows are sashes, those in the ground floor with wedge lintels.	II
The Forge; 52.98563°N 1.48736°W		Early 19th century	Originally a toll house, later a private house, it is in gritstone, and has a tile roof with a coped gable to the south. There are two storeys and three bays. In the left bay is a canted bay window, and to the right are a doorway and sash windows.	II
Burley House; 52.97368°N 1.48059°W	—	1828	A red brick house, mainly rendered, that has a Welsh slate roof with coped gables. There are three storeys, and a south front of four bays. The doorway has pilasters and a bracketed hood, and the windows are sashes with wedge lintels. On the west wall is an inscribed datestone.	II
Duffield Baptist Church, house, walls and railings 52.98196°N 1.48646°W		1830	The house was added to the church in 1871. They are in gritstone and red brick, with quoins, sill bands, a moulded eaves cornice, and a hipped Welsh slate roof. There are two storeys and an L-shaped plan, and the doorway and windows have round-arched heads. The burial ground is enclosed by a low stone wall with iron railings.	II
Road bridge over railway 52.98250°N 1.48280°W	—	1838–42	The bridge was built by the North Midland Railway to carry Mekeney Road over its line. It is in red brick faced in sandstone, and consists of five elliptical arches. The piers have an impost band, voussoirs, and spandrels. There is a moulded band under the coped parapet, and end piers.	II
Duffield North Bridge; 52.99397°N 1.48818°W	—	c. 1839	The bridge was built by the North Midland Railway to carry Derby Road (A6 road\) over its line. It is in sandstone, and consists of three elliptical arches. The bridge has piers with pilaster strips, voussoirs, a stepped band, a shallow coped parapet, and end piers.	II
Old Chapel, gate piers and railings 52.98792°N 1.48720°W		1843	The chapel is in gritstone with a hipped Welsh slate roof. There are two storeys and a front of three bays, with angle pilasters, a moulded cornice, and a blocking course. The central doorway has a dated lintel, and a cornice on consoles. The windows are sashes, in the ground floor with flat heads, and in the upper floor with round-arched heads and an impost band. At the front are four stone gate piers with iron railings and gates.	II
Lodge, Duffield Cemetery; 52.99305°N 1.49488°W	—	1880	The lodge at the entrance to the cemetery is in gritstone, and has a tile roof, half-Hipped to the south. There are two storeys and an irregular plan. In the angle is a squat staircase tower with stepped lancet windows and slits, and a lean-to porch on its left. In the south and the east front are a square bay windows with hipped roofs, and the windows are mullioned and transomed.	II
North Chapel, Duffield Cemetery; 52.99330°N 1.49501°W	—	1880	The chapel is in gritstone with a moulded eaves cornice, and a tile roof with coped gables and moulded kneelers. It is in Early English style, and has angle buttresses, a gabled porch, and a chamfered entrance with a hood mould. The windows are lancets with trefoil heads, and the south window has four lights.	II
South Chapel, Duffield Cemetery; 52.99280°N 1.49453°W	—	1880	The chapel is in gritstone, with a moulded eaves cornice, and a tile roof with coped gables, moulded kneelers, and a cross finial. It is in High Victorian Gothic style, and consists of a nave, a polygonal apse, and a central porch tower. The tower has diagonal buttresses, a doorway with a chamfered surround and a hood mould, and a square base broaching to an octagonal bell stage with an open colonnade and an octagonal cap. The windows are lancets.	II
War memorial 52.98143°N 1.48166°W		1921	The war memorial is to the northwest of St Alkmund's Church. It is in gritstone, and consists of a Latin cross on a square plinth with a base of three steps. On the middle step is a metal railing. The plinth has inscriptions and the names of those lost in the two World Wars.	II
