= Arthur Heywood =

Sir Arthur Percival Heywood, 3rd Baronet
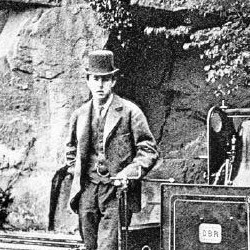
- with his first engine at Duffield Bank Railway in 1875
- Born: 25 December 1849; Denstone, Staffordshire, England
- Died: 19 April 1916 (aged 66); Duffield, Derbyshire, England
- Education: Eton College; Trinity College, Cambridge
- Spouse: Margaret Effie

Sir Arthur Percival Heywood, 3rd Baronet (25 December 1849 – 19 April 1916) is best known today as the innovator of the fifteen-inch minimum-gauge railway, for estate use.

== Early life ==
He was the eldest son of Sir Thomas Percival Heywood and grew up in the family home of Dove Leys at Denstone in Staffordshire.

Dove Leys looked over the valley where the North Staffordshire Railway from Rocester to Ashbourne ran. The family travelled by train to their relatives in Manchester and on holiday to Inveran in the Highland region of Scotland. Heywood developed a passion for the railway from an early age.

He assisted his father in his hobby of ornamental metalwork, with a Holtzapffel lathe, and in his late teenage, built a 4 in gauge model railway with a steam locomotive. Wanting something on which his younger siblings could ride, he went on to build a 9 in gauge locomotive and train, which gave him the experience for his later ventures.

Initially schooled at Eton, in 1868, he went on to Trinity College, Cambridge, where he made friends with the local railway people, cadging lifts on the footplates of locos. He graduated in 1872 with a master's degree in Applied Science. The Heywood family originally made its fortune in the trans-Atlantic slavery trade, which operated in Liverpool, and as a landed gentleman, however, convention frowned on him developing an engineering career.

== Later life ==
In 1872 he married his cousin, Margaret Effie, daughter of the Reverend George Sumner, Rector of Alresford in Hampshire, and set up home at Duffield Bank, near Duffield, Derbyshire near Derby, the headquarters of the Midland Railway. Since many of the directors lived in Duffield, he soon developed an interest in Derby Works. He became aware of experiments by the Royal Engineers in building railways in warfare.

These first experiments had been distinctly unsuccessful, as had previous attempts dating back several decades to build "portable railways" for agricultural use. Thus, at what was known as the Duffield Bank Railway, Heywood developed what he called the "minimum-gauge railway". He settled on 15 in (381 mm) as the optimum, his previous 9 in (229 mm) line having proved to be too small to carry people in a stable manner. Built on a steep hillside, the line was an ideal testing ground and, to gain the adhesion for steep gradients and the ability to negotiate small radius curves, he built six-coupled locomotives with what he called his "radiating axle."

Though the line remained in use for many years and was visited by many potential buyers, the only interest came from the Duke of Westminster for whom he built the Eaton Hall Railway.

Sir Arthur also had a keen interest in campanology (bell ringing) and in 1891 he founded the Central Council of Church Bell Ringers. He often joined the ringers at Duffield St. Alkmunds church where he was a churchwarden and sidesman. In 1887 he augmented St. Alkmunds' ring of bells from eight to ten.

He was a board member of the Derbyshire Royal Infirmary and the president of the Infirmary in 1895.

He was the chair of the Derbyshire police Standing Joint Committee for a number of years, High Sheriff of Derbyshire for 1899, a Justice of the Peace for Derbyshire and later for Staffordshire by virtue of his seat at Dove Leys.

Sir Arthur's father died in 1897 and he inherited Dove Leys, where he began to build another railway between the road, where there was a coal store, and the house. His intention was to extend to Norbury railway goods yard, but Colonel Clowes who owned the land in between refused to give him wayleave. Sir Arthur then extended the line southwards to nearby Dove Cliff farm, which was part of his estate, and thence to Rocester station. However he was again unable to obtain wayleave from his other neighbour, Colonel Dawson.

When World War I began in 1914, all three of his sons went on active service, as did many of his staff. Sir Arthur carried on, particularly with work on the Eaton Hall Railway. One of his last acts was to present the Volunteer Training Corps with 50 rifles. He was unwell in the early part of 1916 and took a turn for the worse on 19 April during a visit to Duffield Bank where he died that afternoon, aged 66.

Sir Arthur Heywood was buried at Denstone on 22 April 1916.

== Heywood radiating axle locomotives ==
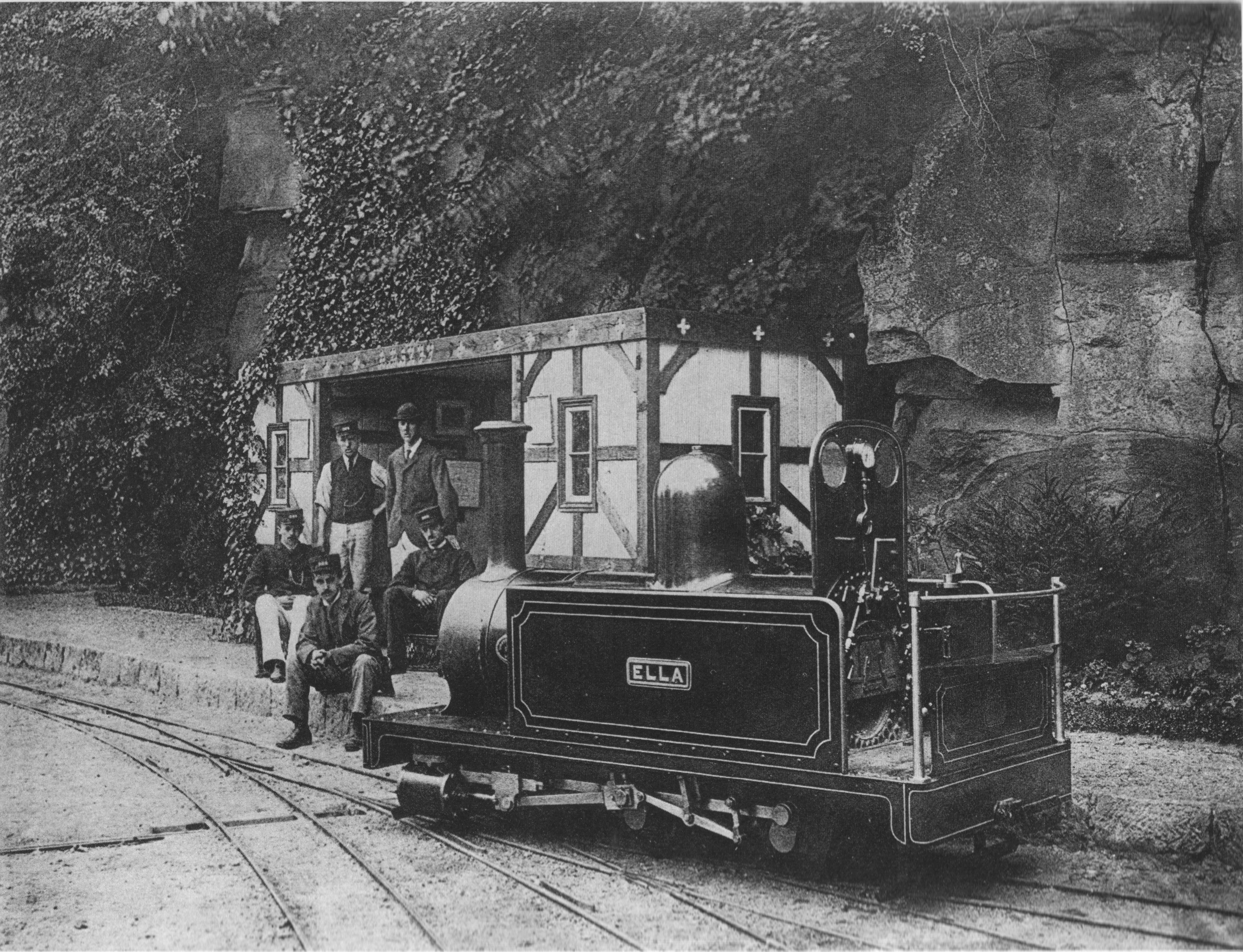
The first steam engine with radiating axles was the 15 in (381 mm) gauge 0-6-0 steam locomotive Ella built in 1881, sold to the Ravenglass and Eskdale Railway in 1917 and scrapped in 1923

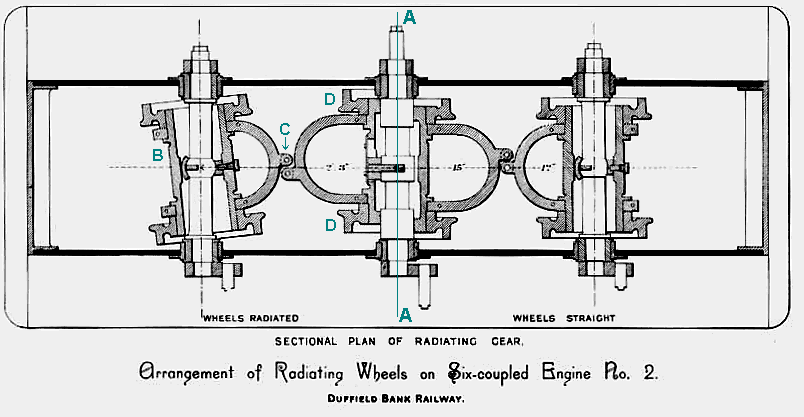
The axle arrangement of the first Heywood radiating axle locomotive Ella is shown in two drawings in one. Right of line A–A, the wheels and axles are positioned for straight track. Left of line A–A, the system is shown in a sharp curve: The centre frame is pushed sidewards and pivots the outer axles so that all wheels are parallel to the track. It is driven by a spherical transmission.

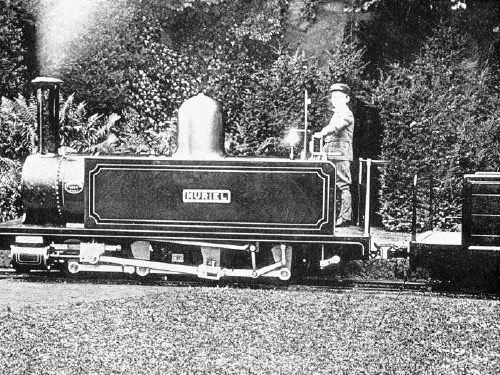
The second steam engine with radiating axles was the 15 in (381 mm) gauge 0-8-0 steam locomotive Muriel built in 1894.

The Heywood radiating axle locomotives could pass very tight curves by a special axle arrangement. This was first drawn by Arthur Heywood in 1877 and described in a book published in 1881, much earlier than the patent filings of the Klien-Lindner axle and Luttermöller axle. On steam locomotives with three axles the frame of the middle axis could move transversely to the left and right underneath the main frame of the locomotive. The frame was hinged to the two pivoted frames of the front and rear axle. In sharp curves of the track it aligned all axles exactly perpendicular to the track, so that the axes would meet in the centre point of the track's curve.

The principle is similar to that of the radiating axles invented by James Cleminson of London for railway carriages, which "consists in mounting the axles with their axle boxes, guards, and springs in frames separate from the main under-frame of the carriage. The end frames have central pivots, around which they swivel freely, while the middle frame is so arranged that it can slide transversely. The three frames are connected together by articulated radiating gear, so that they act sympathetically, and, no matter how sharp the curve, each axle instantly assumes a position coincident with the radial lines of that curve, instead of remaining parallel to each other as in the ordinary construction, in which the wheels grind their way along the sides of the rails. The wear and tear of tyres and rails is thus greatly reduced, because the flanges of the tyres are always parallel with the rails."

== See also ==
- Cleminson's patent
- Lateral motion device
- Luttermöller axle
- Minimum railway curve radius

== Bibliography ==
- Clayton, H., (1968) The Duffield Bank and Eaton Railways. The Oakwood Press, X19, ISBN 0-85361-034-7
- Heywood, Arthur Percival (1974) [1898]. Minimum Gauge Railways (3rd ed.). Turntable Publications. ISBN 0-902844-26-1.
- Household, Humphrey (1989). Narrow Gauge Railways: England and the Fifteen Inch. Sutton Publishing. ISBN 0862995752.
- Mosley, David; van Zeller, Peter (1986). Fifteen Inch Gauge Railways. Newton Abbot: David & Charles. ISBN 0-7153-8694-8.
- Smithers, Mark, (1995) Sir Arthur Heywood and the Fifteen Inch Gauge Railway, Plateway Press, ISBN 1-871980-22-4,
- Waterfield, James (2019). The Railways of Sir Arthur Percival Heywood – Volume One – Duffield Bank and Dove Leys. Gwynedd: RCL Publications. ISBN 978-0956515780.

Baronetage of the United Kingdom
Preceded by Thomas Percival Heywood	Baronet (of Claremont, Lancashire); 1897–1916	Succeeded by Graham Percival Heywood
