= St Alkmund's Church, Duffield =

St Alkmund’s Church, Duffield
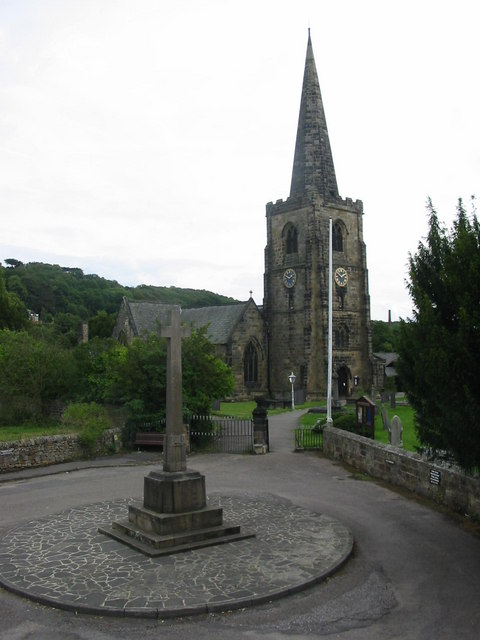
- St Alkmund’s Church, Duffield
- St Alkmund’s Church, Duffield
- 52°58′51.96″N 1°28′51.24″W
- Location: Duffield
- Country: England
- Denomination: Church of England
- Website: stalkmundsduffield.co.uk

History
- Dedication: St Alkmund

Administration
- Diocese: Diocese of Derby
- Archdeaconry: Derby
- Deanery: Duffield
- Parish: Duffield

Saint Alkmund's Church is a parish church in the Church of England in Duffield, Derbyshire.

== History ==
It dates back to the first millennium, and is situated on the banks of the River Derwent to the south of Duffield, Derbyshire, England. It is the parish church of Duffield, and is associated with the nearby church of St Paul's in Little Eaton. In times past, the Parish of Duffield was much larger than it is now, covering the area known as Duffield Frith. The church's distance from the centre of the village is thought be because it was next to Duffield Bridge, which was used by pilgrims and other travellers.

The church is Grade I listed. The current building dates from the 14th century, but was restored in 1847 by James Piers St Aubyn and in 1896–97 by John Oldrid Scott. Its weathercock was installed in 1719 by ironsmith Robert Bakewell.

The church is in a joint benefice with St Paul's Church, Little Eaton, which was formerly part of Duffield Frith.

== Bells ==
During the restoration of 1887, the peal of eight bells was augmented to ten by a gift from Sir Arthur Heywood, 3rd Baronet. St Alkmund's is one of only a few churches outside the larger centres so endowed.

== Organ ==
The church has a pipe organ by Cousans dating from 1972. A specification of the organ can be found on the National Pipe Organ Register.

== Current leadership ==
- Rev. Dr. James Hughes: Vicar of St Alkmunds, Duffield, and also of St Pauls, Little Eaton
- James Rollin: Licensed Lay Minister for Discipleship and Evangelism
- Rev. Jim Wigglesworth: Curate

== See also ==
- Grade I listed churches in Derbyshire
- Grade I listed buildings in Derbyshire
- Listed buildings in Duffield, Derbyshire
