= Duffield, Derbyshire =

Village in Derbyshire, England

Coordinates: 52.989°N 1.489°W

Duffield
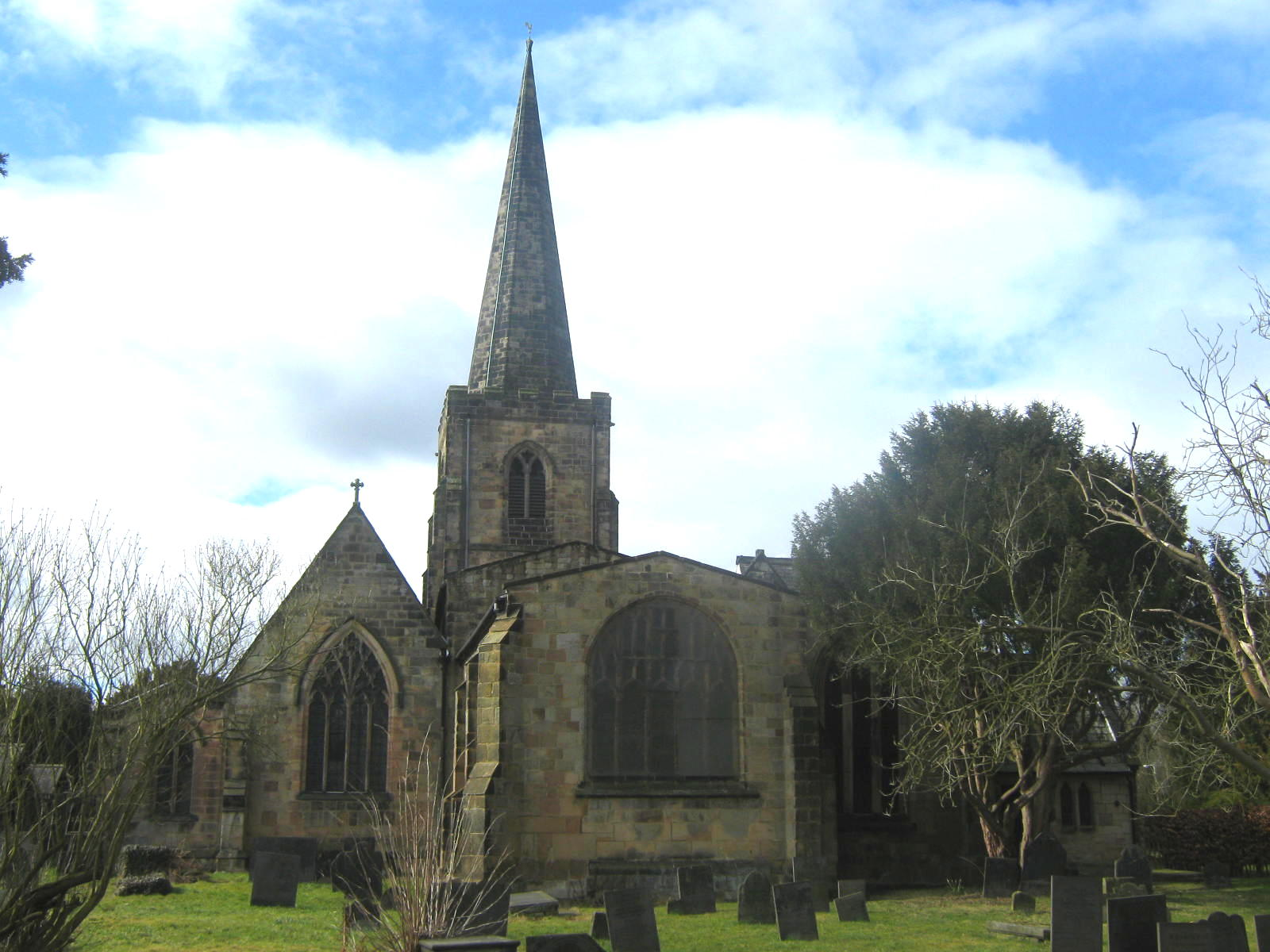
- St Alkmunds Church

- Location within Derbyshire
- Area: 7.859 km^{2} (3.034 sq mi)
- Population: 5,046 (2011 census)
  - Density: 642/km^{2} (1,660/sq mi)
- OS grid reference: SK351476
- Civil parish: Duffield
- District: Amber Valley
- Shire county: Derbyshire
- Region: East Midlands
- Country: England
- Sovereign state: United Kingdom
- Post town: BELPER
- Postcode district: DE56
- Dialling code: 01332
- Police: Derbyshire
- Fire: Derbyshire
- Ambulance: East Midlands
- UK Parliament: Mid Derbyshire

Duffield (/ˈdʌfiːld/) is a town in the Amber Valley district of Derbyshire, 5 miles (8.0 km) north of Derby. It is centred on the western bank of the River Derwent at the mouth of the River Ecclesbourne. It is within the Derwent Valley Mills World Heritage Area and the southern foothills of the Pennines.

== History ==
=== Early history ===
There have been humans in the area, probably, from the Iron Age. A palaeolithic hand axe has been discovered near the head of the River Ecclesbourne at Hopton. In the Duffield area itself, settlement by the Celts occurred in 400BCE. Although it has been suggested that, once farming began, they would have inhabited the plains of the Derwent and Ecclesbourne, they would most likely have retreated to higher ground during the winter floods.

The Romans arrived in the area in 43CE. It has been suggested that they built a fort to protect the ford across which the caravans of lead from Wirksworth joined Rykneld Street at Derby, en route for the North Sea ports, though this is disputed.

=== Anglo Saxon settlement ===
A few remains have, however, been found of Anglo-Saxon occupation by a person, or persons, of some substance. The Domesday Survey records "Duvelle" as being within the wapentake or hundred of Morleystone. In Norman times, Duffield Castle was built to protect the hunting grounds of Duffield Frith, awarded to Henry de Ferrers (or de Ferrars) by William I. Most of this became the ancient parish of Duffield, which contained the townships of Hazlewood, Holbrook, Makeney, Milford, Shottle, and Windley, and the chapelries of Belper, Heage, and Turnditch.

Meanwhile, St Alkmunds Church was built some quarter of a mile south. Its position, so far from the village, it is thought, arose from its purpose, in Anglo-Saxon times, of serving travellers crossing the river on their way from Ashbourne to Nottingham. The original part of the present building, however, is Norman. Duffield Bridge was built across the river, next to the present Bridge Inn, in the thirteenth century and widened in the eighteenth. This later became the main road to the north and, in the eighteenth century the road along Duffield Bank was improved, as the 'New Chesterfield Turnpike'.

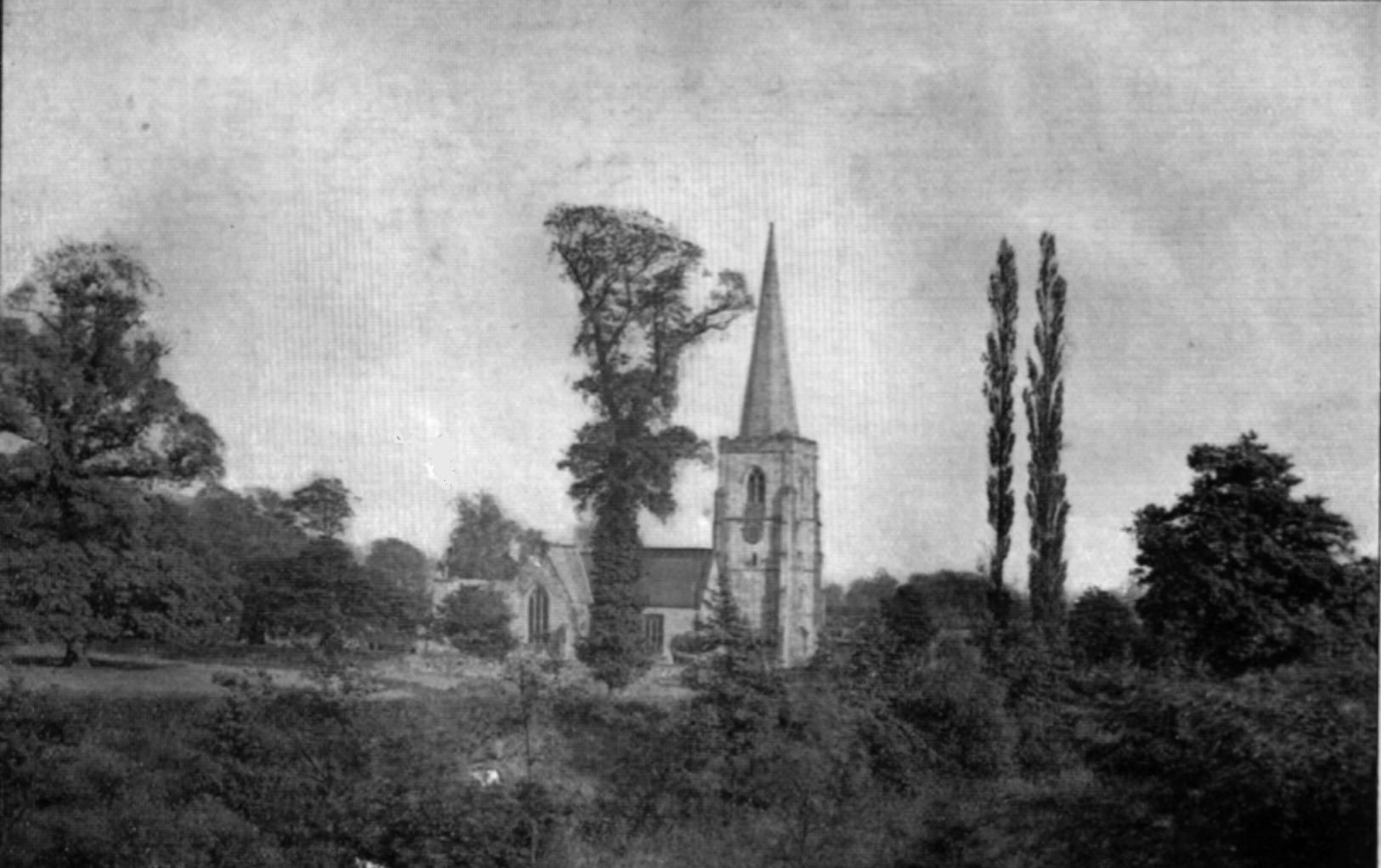
Duffield Church from the North West (c. 1922)

=== Norman invasion ===
Meanwhile, there was a growing community next to Duffield Castle built by Henri de Ferrers. For many centuries, Duffield was by far the largest centre of population in the parish. Following the rebellion by Robert de Ferrers, 6th Earl of Derby his lands became part of the Duchy of Lancaster until the reign of Charles I. These included the manor of Duffield and seven parks in Duffield Frith namely, Ravensdale, Schethull (Shottle), Postern, Bureper (Belper), Morley, and Schymynde-cliffe, (Shining Cliff) In the Parliamentary Commissioners' report of 1650 respecting Duffield and its chapelries, Belper is described as "a hamlet appertaining to Duffield." One other near Duffield was Champain Park to the South West, in the area of what is now Champion Farm on Cumberhills.

Some idea of Duffield's prosperity can be gained from the size of the Church and its later additions. In the forest, there had been plentiful game, and a supply of timber, particularly oak, while the farmland was exceedingly fertile, though prone to flooding. Even with the controls on the rivers with the various weirs and dams in the eighteenth century, the centre of the village was subject to regular floods until the middle of the twentieth century.

=== Medieval ===
A notable resident in the sixteenth century was Anthony Bradshaw who erected a monument in the Church to himself and his large family. He was distantly related to John Bradshaw, who condemned Charles I to death.

Sir Roger Mynor was High Sheriff in 1514, Sergeant of the King's Cellar, an official of Duffield Frith under the Duchy of Lancaster and a Commissioner of Peace for the County of Derby. He, with his lady, has a magnificent table-tomb in St. Alkmunds Church, Duffield.

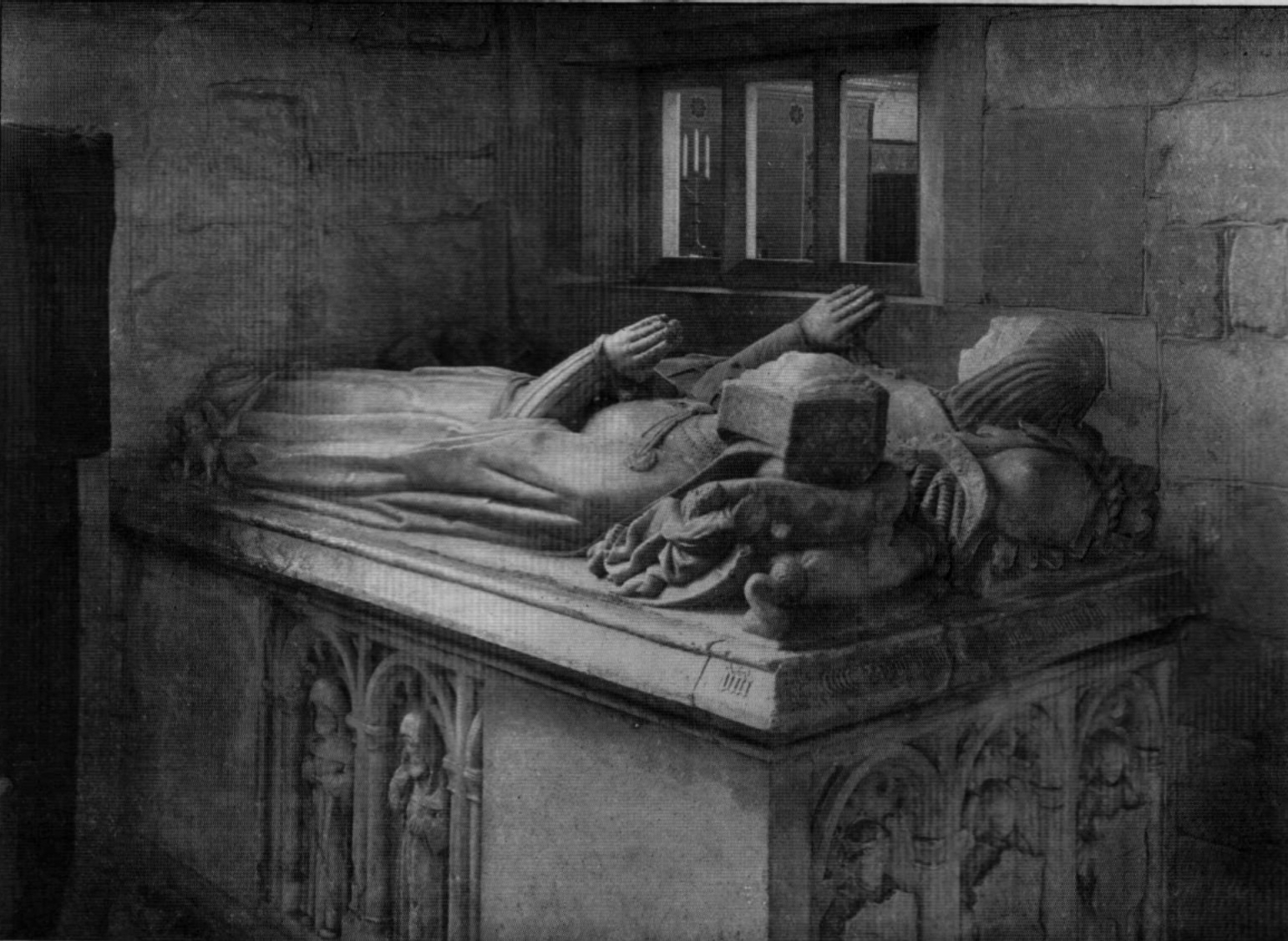
Tomb of Sir Roger Mynor and his lady in Duffield Parish Church

The first school in Duffield was Duffield Boys' Endowed School, now known as the William Gilbert School, originally in the centre of the village next to the Ecclesbourne. On 21 June 1565, we read that "at a court of the Manor of Duffield Frith, William Gilbert surrendered a cottage and lands and closes for providing and sustaining an honest and learned man within Duffield Frith, to teach and instruct boys in honest and pious discipline and literature." The schoolmaster's wages were settled at 12d. a quarter for every scholar being a grammarian, and 8d. for everyone inferior to a grammarian; but he might take other private pupils.

The medieval manor was replaced in about 1620 when Duffield Hall was built.

=== Nineteenth century ===
The major activity up to the nineteenth century was agriculture. There were two cattle-fairs; the Thursday after New Year's Day, and 1 March. Ironstone is associated with coal deposits in Derbyshire, which outcropped in the Belper and Duffield areas. It is thought that these were what attracted the de Ferrars family to the area, and there are frequent references to iron-working in historical records, with a forge near to the present Baptist Chapel. There were also several corn mills and quarries. Flax, for linen, had been grown in Flaxholme, from the fifteenth century, on the instructions from King Henry VIII. Silk thread began to be produced in quantity by John Lombe in Derby, likewise cotton thread in Belper. By the nineteenth century, the major occupation in the village itself was framework knitting, encouraged by Jedediah Strutt's famous 'Derby Rib', while a paper mill opened at Peckwash.

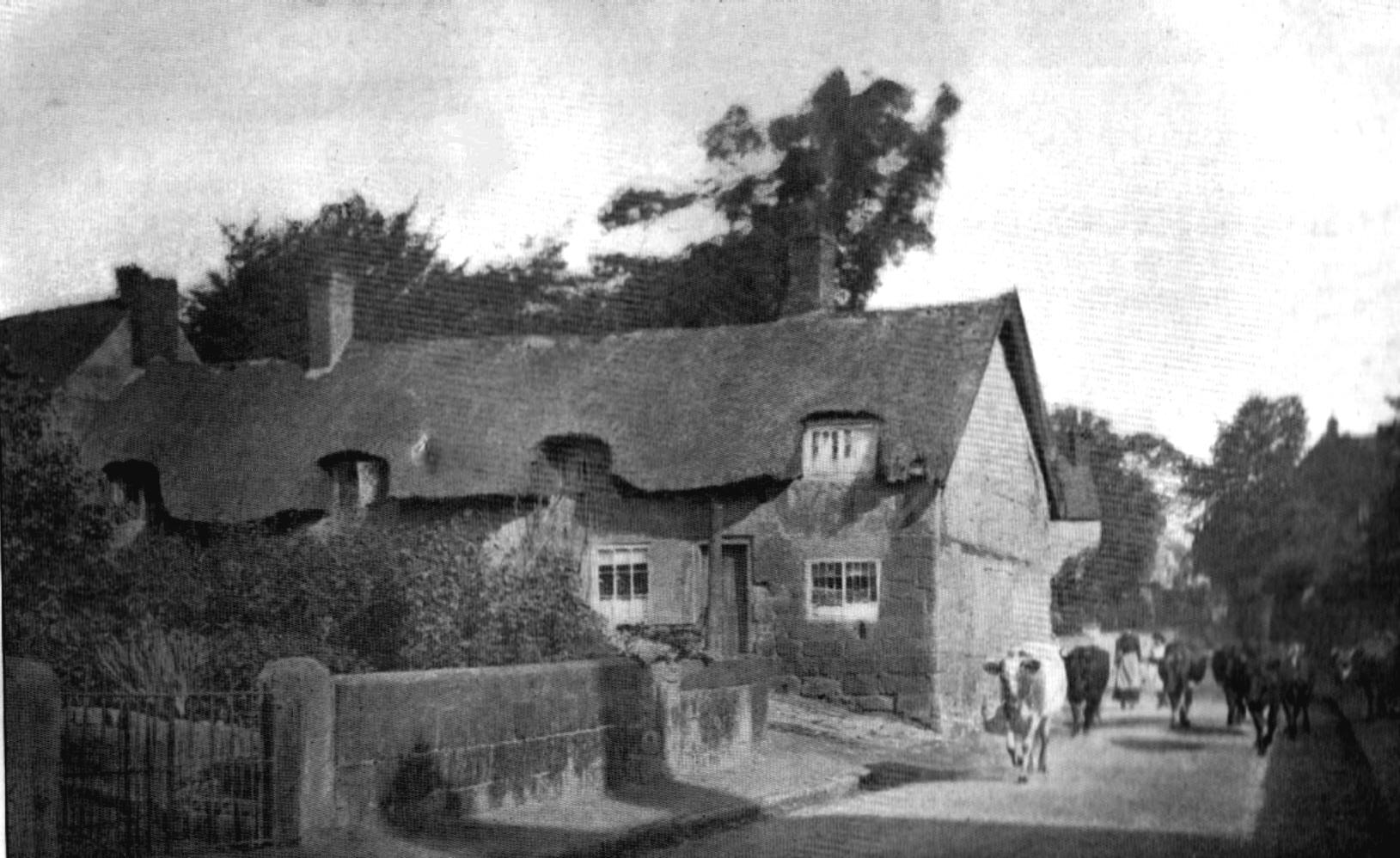
Cottages in Hazelwood Road removed to build the Church Hall (c. 1900)

The biggest change came with the coming of the North Midland Railway which passed through from 1840, with the opening of Duffield railway station. Initially, this was a short way further north the present one, and probably little more than a halt. The line also cut the lane to the church with a footbridge provided at a later date. North of the village, the main road had been previously realigned on the west side of the cottages known as Castle Orchard, with a slice out of the castle mound, leading to a new road north called New Mills Road. The railway northwards followed the alignment of the old road, passing under the new one with a magnificent stone-built skew arch bridge.

A permanent station was opened in 1841 in its present position, as the village expanded with homes for the Midland Railway workers and management, the former settling in the village around the end of King Street, the managers in larger houses further along the main road and further up King Street and Hazlewood Road.

When the new station was extended with the Wirksworth branch, it created a good deal more upheaval, since the line cut across the road north out of the village. This was along the side of the Kings Head joining the present Chapel Street and in front of the station. It already had been rebuilt in 1835, raised to a higher level because of the frequency of flooding. A new road was built on the other side of the King's Head with a bridge over the branch. In addition, a tunnel was driven under King Street.

Around this time a new boys' school was built in Vicarage Lane, with a girls' school lower down King Street, with the Infants' School opposite. Less well-remembered, though revered by narrow, 'minimum gauge', railway enthusiasts, was the Duffield Bank Railway, built by Sir Arthur Heywood at his house to the east of the village.

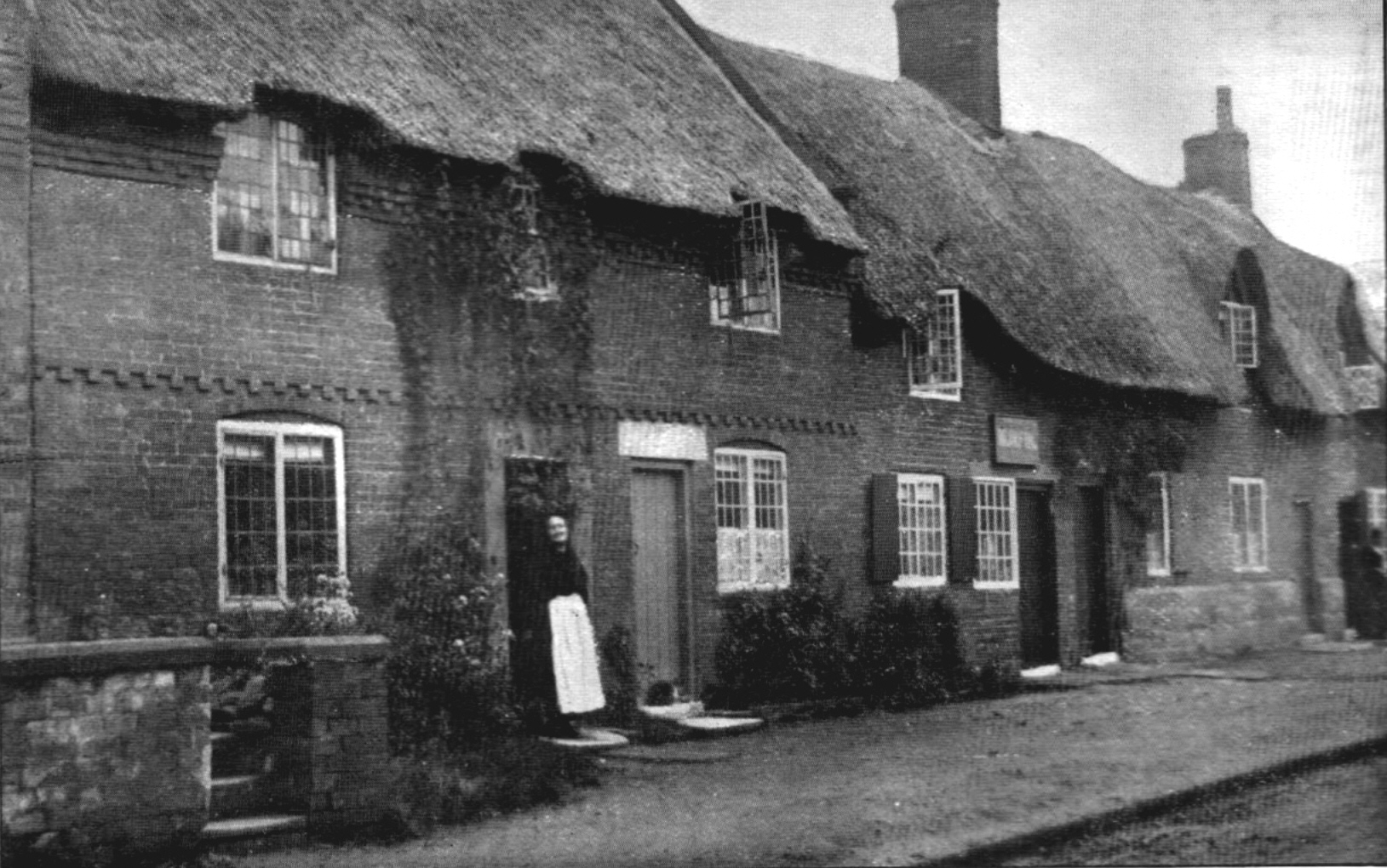
Cottages in Tamworth Street (c. 1900)

=== Twentieth century ===
The coming of Rolls-Royce in the 1910s brought further expansion, with even bigger houses up Hazlewood Road, and council-provided housing along Holloway Road.

Throughout the 'thirties and 'forties, middle-class housing was appearing in the old Wirksworth Road, and in Flaxholme. The semi-detached houses to the west of Cumberhills Road are something of a mystery. Clearly, they were a speculative middle-class project, but in 1910 they were isolated among fields half a mile from the village – hardly attractive, one would have thought, to prospective purchasers.

For such a small village, Duffield seems to have been well served with public houses. Near the church was the White Lion and nearby on the main road at the south, there was the Noah's Ark, a coaching inn. Still in existence is the White Hart, which is not the original building, and a little further up, was the Nag's Head. Next is the King's Head, probably the oldest still in existence. When the Commissioners appointed by Parliament to divide up the common and waste lands of Duffield Parish sat in 1787, they held their meetings at the King's Head.

At the top of Crown Street used to be the Crown Inn, and still existing up Hazlewood Road is the New Inn, although this is now been converted to a private dwelling. Outside it are broad flat-topped walls. In the days before Hazelwood had its own cemetery, it is said that funeral parties would stop for refreshment before completing their journey to the church, and would leave the coffin resting on that wall. There was also a Railway Inn near the station and a Castle Inn, near the Parish Room. The Patten Makers' Arms is in Crown Street, named after the pattens which were a type of clog that people made there.

In 1957 The Ecclesbourne School was founded, when George Wimpey, the building developer, built new estates, raising the population to around 5000. One was between Wirksworth Road and the River Ecclesbourne. The other was to the south of Wirksworth Road, extending New Zealand Lane and the previously privately maintained Broadway. The intention was for the latter to meet the Wirksworth Road at Cumberhills Road, but where it crossed New Zealand Lane, the landowner refused to sell and it was several years before there was a right of way. The attraction of the village for housebuyers centres on the successful secondary school, Ecclesbourne and good transport links.

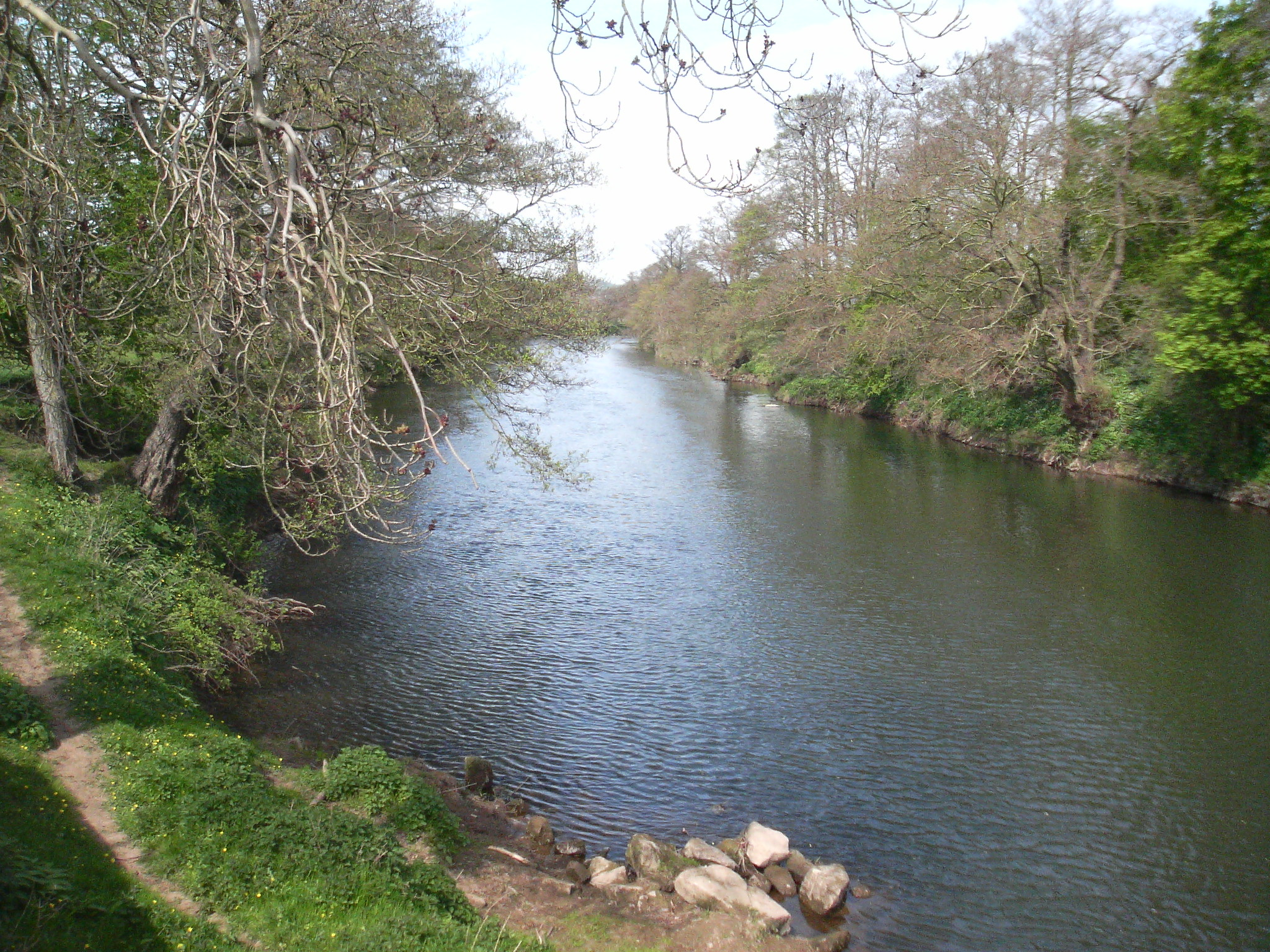
River Derwent south of Duffield

== Education ==
=== Primary schools ===
- William Gilbert Endowed School
- Duffield Meadows Primary School

=== Secondary schools ===
- Ecclesbourne School

== Sports ==
- Duffield Squash Team won the English Premier Squash League (PSL) in 2015. Former world champions Nick Matthew and Laura Massaro are members of the Duffield squad.
- Duffield Cricket Club
- Duffield Dynamos Junior Football
- Duffield Rangers FC

Eyes Meadow is the home of the cricket and football teams.

== Demography ==
2011 Published Statistics: Population, home ownership and extracts from Physical Environment, surveyed in 2005
Output area	Homes owned outright	Owned with a loan	Socially rented	Privately rented	Other	km^{2} green spaces	km^{2} roads	km^{2} water	km^{2} domestic gardens	km^{2} domestic buildings	km^{2} non-domestic buildings	Usual residents	km^{2}
Duffield (CP)	969	681	133	200	27	6.116	0.254	0.116	0.926	0.174	0.047	5,046	7.859

== Notable people ==
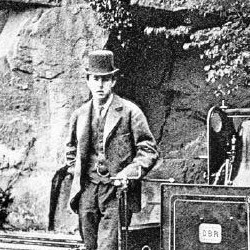
Arthur Heywood at Duffield Bank Railway, 1875

- John Heathcoat (1783–1861), inventor and politician, he improved the warp-weighted loom.
- John Bannister (1816–1873), an English philologist and perpetual curate of Bridgehill, Duffield, from 1846 till 1857.
- Sir Arthur Percival Heywood (1849–1916), innovator of the fifteen-inch minimum-gauge railway
- E. M. Hull (1880–1947), a British writer of romance novels, died locally
- Philip Asterley Jones (1914–1978), solicitor and politician, MP for Hitchin, 1945–1950
- Stefan Buczacki (born 1945), horticulturist, botanist, biographer, novelist and broadcaster.
- Peter Wight (born 1950), British actor, brought up locally, played Policeman Nige in Early Doors.
- Louis Greatorex (born 1996), actor, known for his role in the BBC One comedy-drama Last Tango in Halifax (2012–2020).

=== Sport ===
- Ernest Barnes (1884–1956), track and field athlete who competed in the 1908 Summer Olympics
- David Skinner (1920–1998), cricketer who played 23 first-class cricket matches for Derbyshire
- Geoff Hutt (born 1949), footballer from Hazelwood, who played almost 400 games, including 245 for Huddersfield Town

== See also ==
- Listed buildings in Duffield, Derbyshire
- Ernest Hives, 1st Baron Hives of Duffield (1886–1965), Chairman of Rolls-Royce Ltd, lived at 'Hazeldene' from 1937.

== Bibliography ==
- Watson, W.R. (1986), An Illustrated History of Duffield,
- Watson, W.R. (1991), The Derbyshire Village of Duffield Past and Present ISBN 0-9511563-1-4.
- Bland, J. (1922), Duffield: Village, Church and Castle, Derby: Harpur and Son
