= Perrygrove Railway =

Minimum gauge railway in the Forest of Dean, England

Coordinates: 51°46′57″N 2°36′40″W

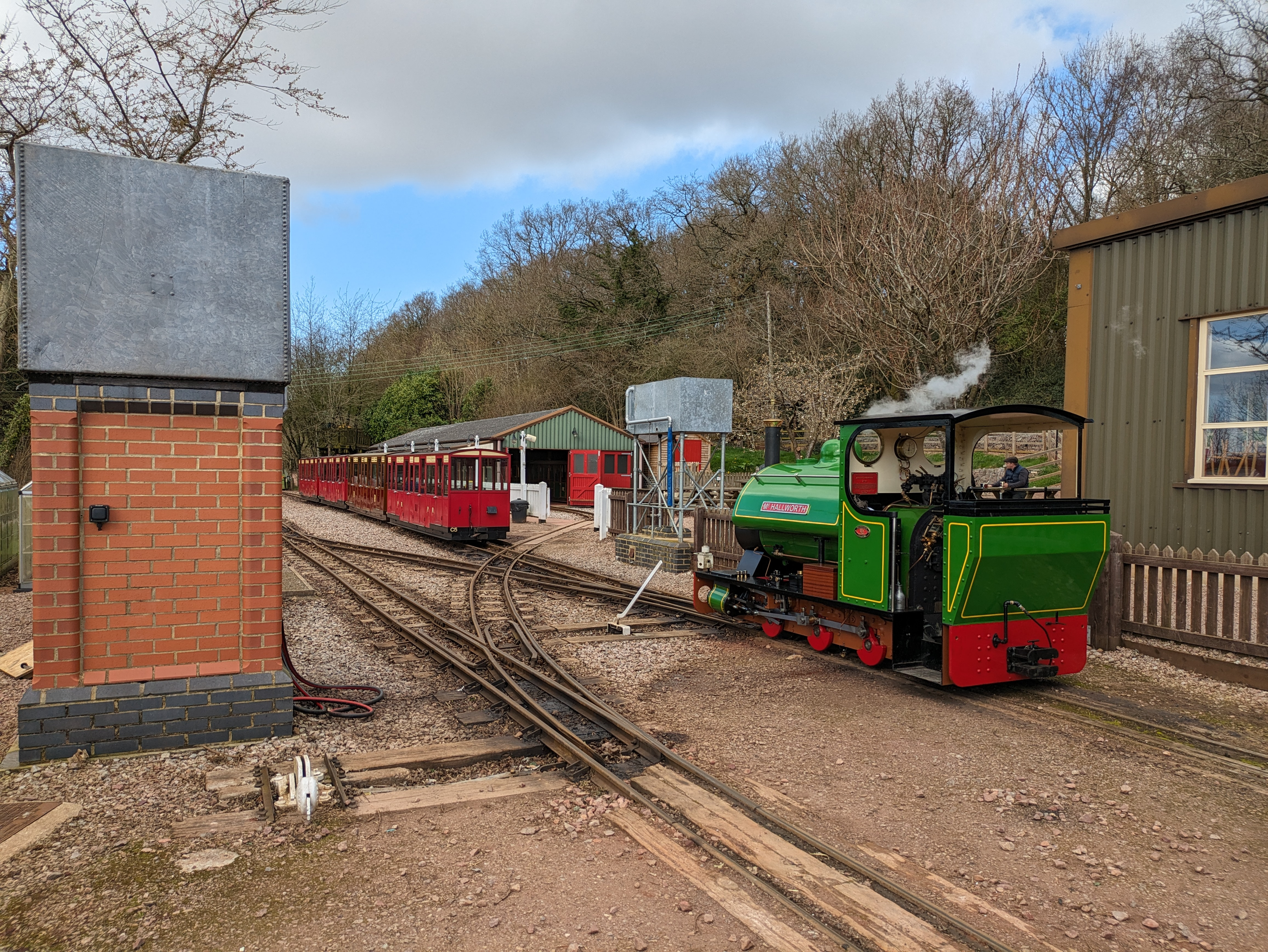
"Mr Hallworth" at Perrygrove Station

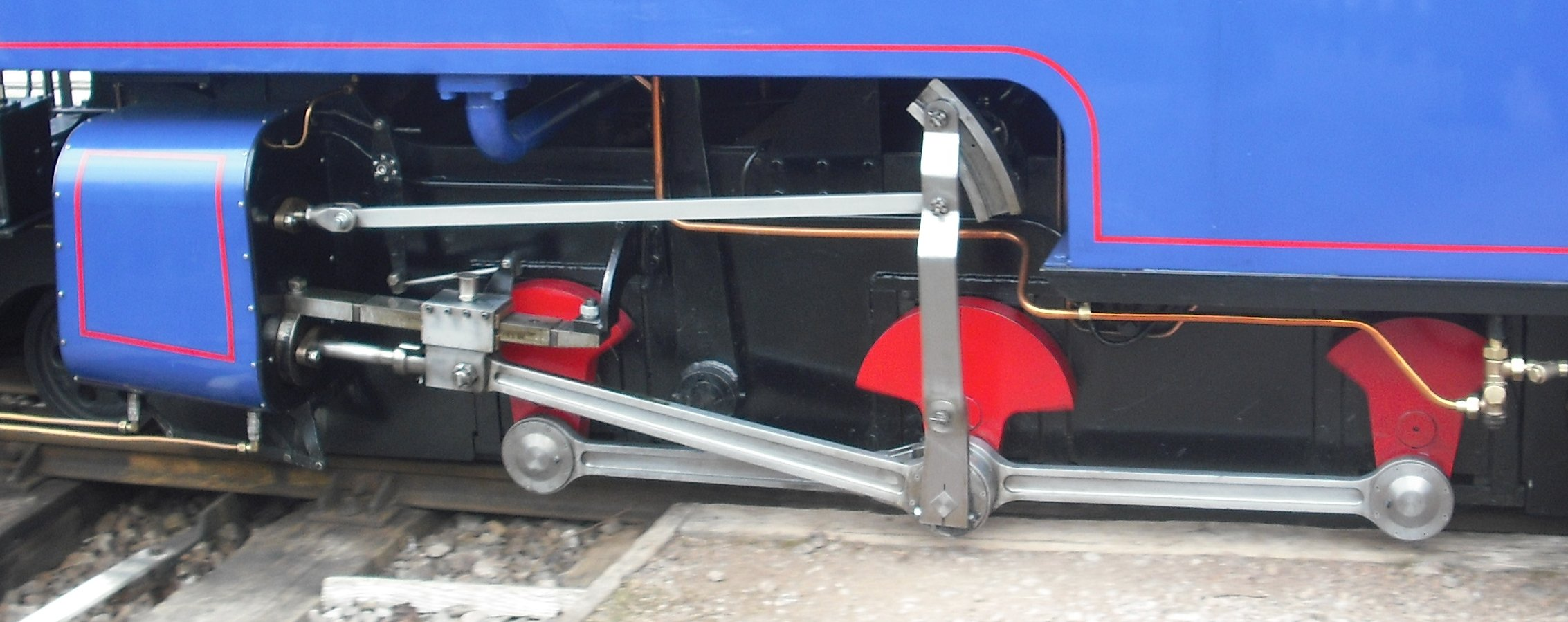
Lydia's Hackworth valvegear

Perrygrove Railway is a minimum-gauge railway of 15 in (381 mm) gauge. It is located at Perrygrove Farm in the Forest of Dean, near Coleford, Gloucestershire, England. Trains travel at frequent intervals on a round trip of 1 1/2 miles (2.4 km) between four stations. Passengers can ride on the train to use activities including a Treetop Adventure, a covered picnic and play area at Foxy Hollow, an Indoor Village with secret passages, and a den-building area in the woods.

The railway was inspired by the minimum gauge estate railways or British narrow gauge railways developed by Sir Arthur Heywood at the end of the 19th century, including his pioneering Duffield Bank Railway and the later Eaton Hall Railway. Until mid 2014, based at Perrygrove were the Heywood Collection and associated replica vehicles built by James Waterfield, including the locomotive "Ursula" and the Duffield Bank Dining Carriage. These are now in private storage offsite.

== Locomotives ==
=== Steam ===
Name	Description	Current Status	Livery	Builders	Image
Spirit of Adventure	0-6-0T built by Exmoor Steam Railway	Operational	Maroon	Exmoor Steam Railway	‘Spirit of Adventure’, Perrygrove Railway, Coleford, England arp
Lydia	2-6-2T with a variation on Marshall valvegear	Operational	Midnight Blue	Alan Keef Ltd Withdrawn for overhaul 2017. Re-entered service following overhaul August 2018 .	Lydialoco
Soony	Replica Baldwin 0-4-0, privately owned.	Operational	Green	Joe Nemeth Engineering Ltd.	PerrygroveSoony
Anne	0-6-2T, previously Longleat Railway no. 6 "John Hayton". Arrived February 2015 and entered service September 2016.	Awaiting overhaul	Purple	Exmoor Steam Railway	PerrygroveAnne
Mr Hallworth	0-6-0ST	Operational	Green	North Bay Railway Engineering Services	MrHallworthPerrygrove

=== Diesel ===
Name	Current Status	Livery	Builders	Image
Workhorse	Operational	Yellow	Motor Rail of Bedford	PerrygroveWorkhorse
Jubilee	Operational	Red	Hunslet Engine Company at Jack Lane, Leeds	Perry_Railway_locomotive_"Jubilee"
N/A	Under construction	N/A	Perrygrove Railway. Utilizing components from a Hunslet Jenbach donor locomotive	

== History ==
Perrygrove Farm was purchased by Michael and Frances Crofts in 1993. Construction of the railway commenced in 1995, and it opened on 1 August 1996. The railway welcomes day trippers, tourists and railway enthusiasts.

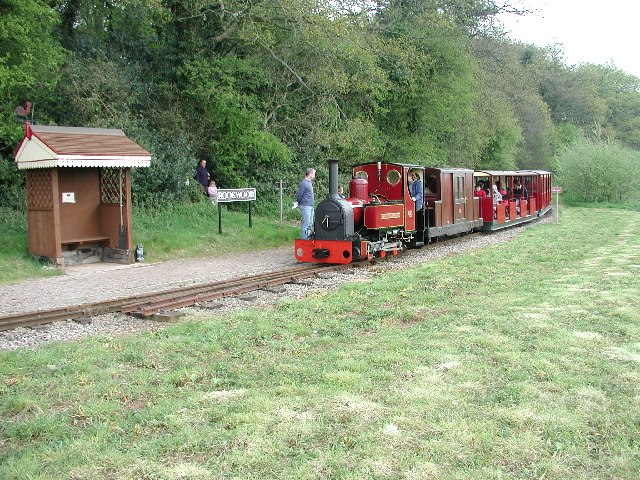
The Spirit of Adventure passing Rookwood Station in 2003

The venue has picnic and play facilities outdoors and under cover, and an indoor village with secret passages, in addition to train rides. A treasure hunt is also offered: the railway supplies a key to open a hidden box of treasure, and clues to help treasure hunters find it. Clues are scattered in the ancient woodland where real treasure was found in 1849. Santa experiences are held in a refurbished area of the carriage shed each year.

There are two sections of 1-in-29 gradient, and two of 1 in 50, and very sharp curves in places, making it an interesting journey for visitors, and challenging for loco crews. In September 2011 a passing loop was commissioned at Rookwood, allowing a 20-minute-interval service at busy times. In 2012 a long siding was laid alongside the loop at Perrygrove. In early 2013, a short, steep spur off the above siding was laid at Perrygrove ("Wharf Road"). In summer 2013, the siding at Oakiron was relaid and a short spur laid off it. A siding was laid at Rookwood, off the passing loop, to allow access to a newly seeded area suitable for marquee-type events, including wedding receptions.

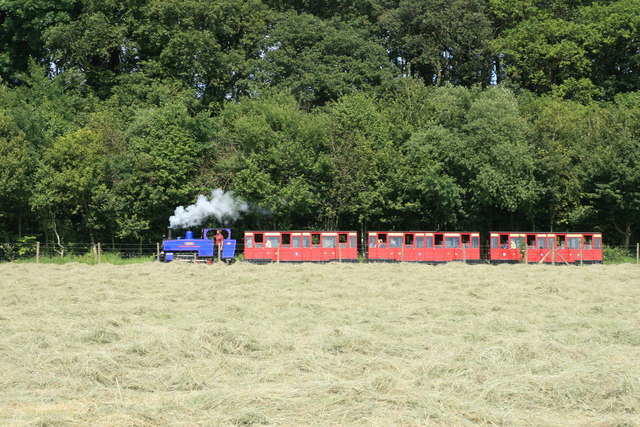
"Lydia" departs Perrygrove Station with a 3-coach train

The railway opened every weekend through the winter of 2012/13 for the first time, using diesel loco "Jubilee" most of the time, with steam on most operating days from Easter, see website.

Articles featuring the railway's "Estate Railway Experience" (where enthusiasts run the line as a Heywood style estate railway) appeared in editions of Miniature Railway magazine, Narrow Gauge World and Garden Railway in spring/ summer 2013, and Steam Railway magazine in December 2013.

The railway regularly hold wedding receptions either in a marquee at Rookwood, or the carriage shed at Perrygrove.

The railway is a member of the Wye Valley and Forest of Dean Tourism Association, which promotes tourism in the area. It is a member of the Heritage Railway Association and Britain's Great Little Railways.
