= Duffield Hall =

Country house in Derbyshire, England

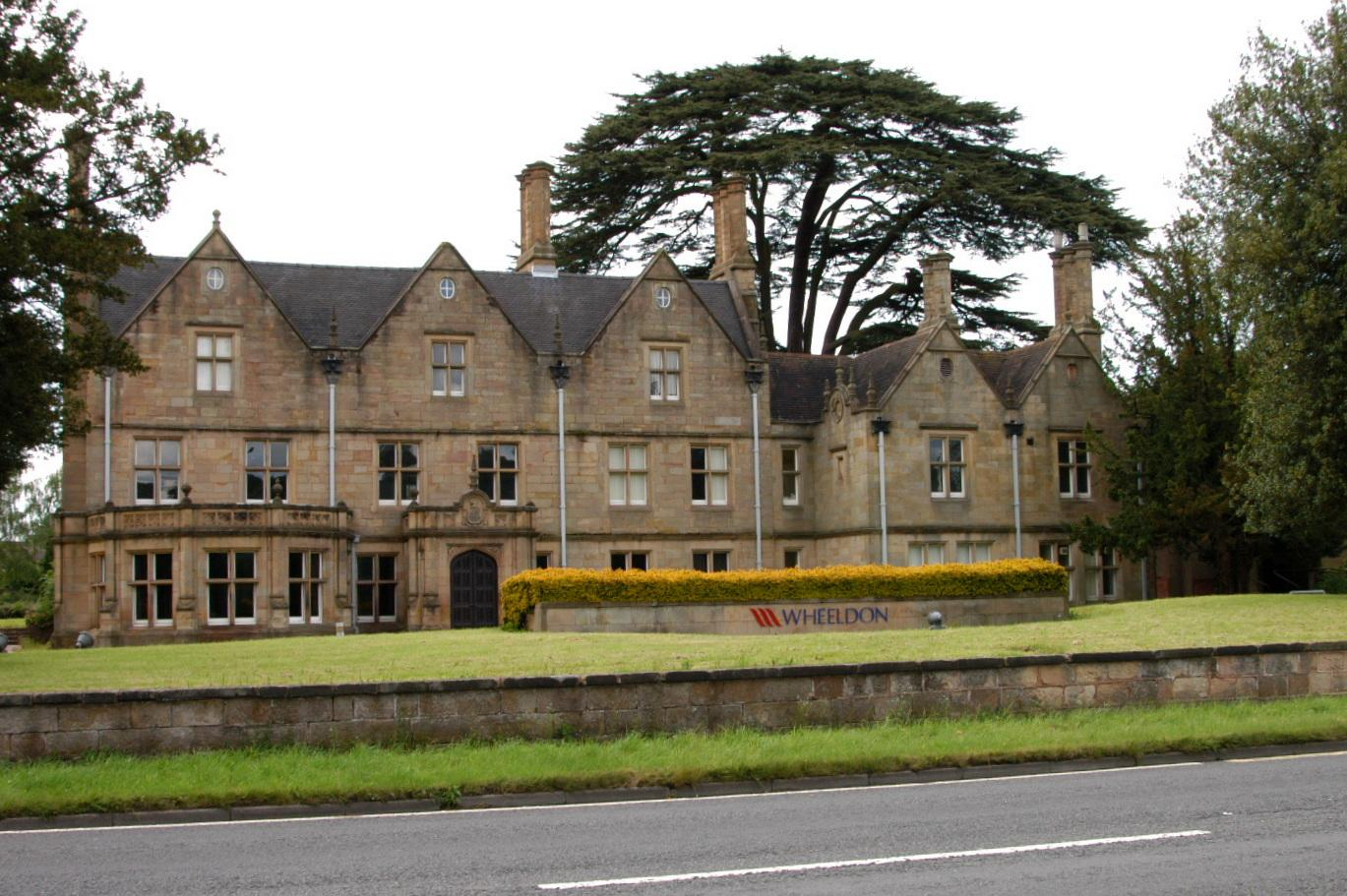
- Duffield Hall, a former school and head office

- Location within Derbyshire

General information
- Coordinates: 52.9833°N 1.4871°W
- Year built: 1620s

Listed Building – Grade II*
- Official name: Duffield Hall
- Designated: 13 February 1967
- Reference no.: 1158301

Duffield Hall is a 17th-century country house in the Amber Valley, Derbyshire, and the former headquarters of the Derbyshire Building Society. It is a Grade II* listed building.

The manor of Duffield was granted by King Charles I to the Newton family who built a new mansion house there in the 1620s. The Newtons sold the house to Henry Coape, High Sheriff of Derbyshire in 1703. His granddaughter and heiress brought the estate to her husband Henry Porter.

In the early 19th century he left the property to his kinsman Thomas Porter Bonell whose daughter married Sir Charles H Colville. After Colville's death, the house was sold to John Bell Crompton of Milford (High Sheriff in 1847) a Banker of Irongate, Derby. He died in 1860 and the estate was acquired by Rowland Smith. Member of Parliament for South Derbyshire 1868-74 and High Sheriff 1877.

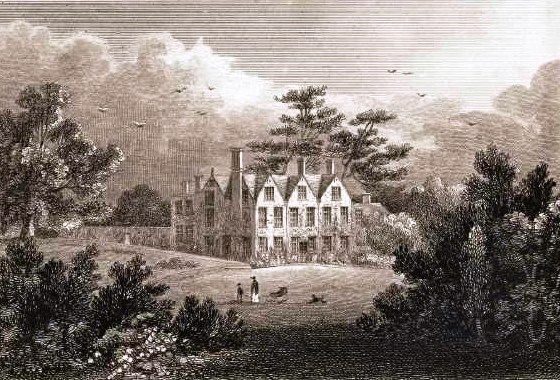
Duffield Hall c 1829-40s

Smith extensively restored and improved the house creating the present mansion of three storeys and five gabled bays.

From 1908 until 1970 the house and estate were occupied by St Ronan's School. By 1928 it was a girls school only and in the 1960s there were 120 boarders and day-students enrolled. The school closed in 1970 and in 1977 the property was acquired by the Derbyshire Building Society for whom it was restored and extended by architects George Grey and Partners. The adjoining estate was sold for the St Ronans Road residential development.

In 2013 planning permission was granted for a change of use to a single dwelling house, demolition of later additions and a new build of bungalows and courtyard houses.

== See also ==
- Grade II* listed buildings in Amber Valley
- Listed buildings in Duffield, Derbyshire
