= Charles Brown (British engineer) =

British mechanical engineer in Switzerland (1827–1905)

Charles Brown (30 June 1827 – 6 October 1905) was a British industrialist, inventor and engineer. He founded the Swiss Locomotive and Machine Works (SLM), and was an engineer and executive of Sulzer and Maschinenfabrik Oerlikon.

== Early life and education ==
Brown was born 30 June 1827 in Uxbridge, England (presently a part of London), the oldest of five children, to Dr. Charles Brown Sr. (1805–1873), a strictly religious dentist, and Jane Brown (née Morton; 1806–1873). His siblings were Sarah Ann (born 1830), Emma Jane (born 1834), John Henry (born 1836) and Archibald.

He was raised in the industrially shaped area of Woolwich. Between 1845 and 1851, Brown apprenticed to Maudslay, Sons and Field, becoming a mechanical engineer. The company was one of the leading steam engine manufacturers at the time. There he was introduced to Swiss Gottlieb Hirzel, a brother-in-law of Johann Jakob Sulzer, of the Sulzer family. Gottlieb was supposed to return to a position at Sulzer Brothers but declined and offered the position to Charles, who ultimately took the opportunity.

== Career ==
In 1851, Brown relocated to Winterthur, Switzerland, to work for Sulzer Brothers as mechanical engineer responsible for machinery construction. At the time Sulzer was a small to medium-sized company with about 100 employees. In 1871, he left Sulzer to set up Swiss Locomotive and Machine Works (SLM). While at SLM he invented the Brown valve gear, a radial valve gear for steam engines. He became involved in the development of electric locomotives in the 1880s. In 1885 he became manager of Maschinenfabrik Oerlikon and in 1890 he set up Charles Brown and Company at 91 Rione Amedeo, Naples, Italy.

== Personal life ==
In 1862, Brown married Eugénie Pfau (1845–1927), a daughter of Jakob Pfau (1803–1882) and Friederike Pfau (née Sulzer; 1811–1856), who both hailed from well-established families in the city of Winterthur. They had six children;

- Charles Eugene Lancelot Brown (1863–1924), who co-founded Brown, Boveri & Cie., married Amelie Nathan (died 1914), a son and a daughter who later emigrated to the United States.
- Sidney William Brown (1865–1941), art collector and executive of Brown, Boveri & Cie, married Fanny Sulzer (1871–1968), three sons.
- Jane France Eugénie Brown (born 1866), married to a Mr. Müller.
- Ellen Kate Maude "Nelly" Brown (1867–1940), married to Dr. Carl Täuber.
- Alice Katharina Eugenie Brown (born 1868).
- Julie Fanny Ida "Juliet" Brown (1869–1943), married to Gustave Jacob Melms (1852–1943).

Brown died 6 October 1905 in Basel, Switzerland. Although being active in Switzerland for the majority of his adult life, Brown retained British nationality, and never naturalized.
