= Tansley =

Village in Derbyshire, England

Coordinates: 53.13213°N 1.5175°W

- Village and civil parish
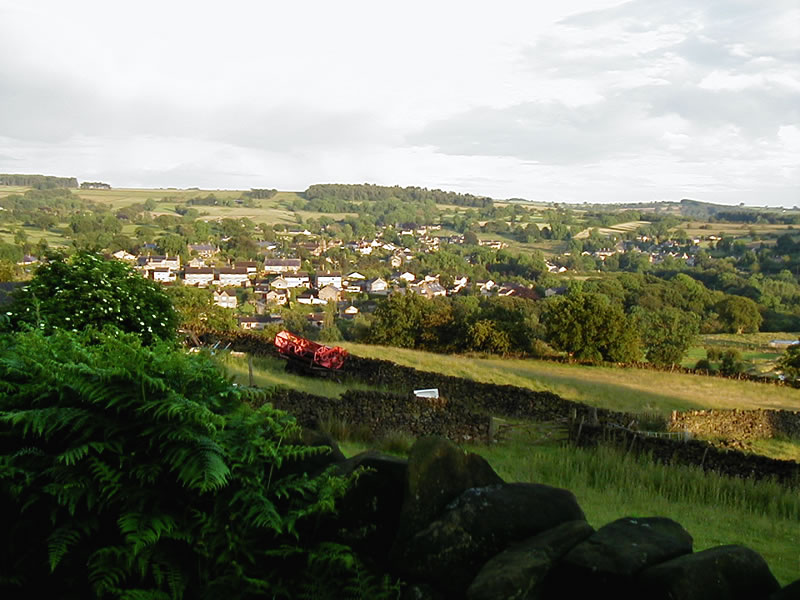
- A view of Tansley from Lumsdale Quarry.

- Location within Derbyshire
- OS grid reference: SK3259
- Civil parish: Tansley
- District: Derbyshire Dales
- Shire county: Derbyshire
- Region: East Midlands
- Country: England
- Sovereign state: United Kingdom
- Post town: Matlock
- Postcode district: DE4
- Police: Derbyshire
- Fire: Derbyshire
- Ambulance: East Midlands
- UK Parliament: Derbyshire Dales
- Website: https://www.tansleyparish.com/

Tansley is a village and civil parish on the southern edge of the Derbyshire Peak District, two miles east of Matlock.

== History ==
Tansley is recorded in the Domesday Book as Taneslege, and its name comes from the combination of the Old English elements tān and lēah. Lēah has been translated as 'woodland clearing', but the tān element is contested. It may mean 'branch', perhaps used of 'a valley branching off from the main valley'. However, it has also been translated as a masculine Anglo-Saxon personal name, that is otherwise unrecorded. Other suggestions have been 'sprout, shoot', thus translating the name as 'wood or clearing from which shoots were obtained'. Tansley grew during the Industrial Revolution, its main industry being the quarrying of millstone grit (for making mill-stones, now adopted as the symbol of the Peak District National Park). A copious amount of water runs off Tansley moor above the village, eventually running into Bentley Brook, a tributary of the Derwent. Bentley Brook and three of its feeder streams have been dammed in the past to make artificial lakes which provided water to power mills. As well as five mills in Lumsdale Valley there were also three mills in Tansley village, two of which remain having been restored for new uses. Nowadays the surviving lakes are stocked with fish for angling. The water also led to the establishment of Tansley Hydro (later Tansley House residential adult care home, now closed) when spas and hydrotherapy were in fashion and Victorian tourists came to the Matlock area for its Romantic charm. Tansley is now more famous for its many garden centres and plant nurseries, its many small businesses and its large Sunday car-boot market.

== Twinning arrangements ==
Tansley has an informal twinning arrangement with the small town of Babadag in Tulcea County, Romania. The two communities have occasional exchange visits, and more frequent postal and email contact, arranged through an organisation named TABALINK (the Tansley Babadag Association). The aims of TABALINK are:

- to promote friendship and understanding between the people of the village of Tansley, and the wider area of Derbyshire, England; and the people of the town of Babadag and the surrounding area of Tulcea, Eastern Romania.

- to build links between the peoples of the communities concerned in all possible ways - educational, cultural and commercial.

- to stimulate and foster mutual exchanges between individuals, families and societies within the communities.

- to organize social and fund raising events and activities to support the objects of the Association.

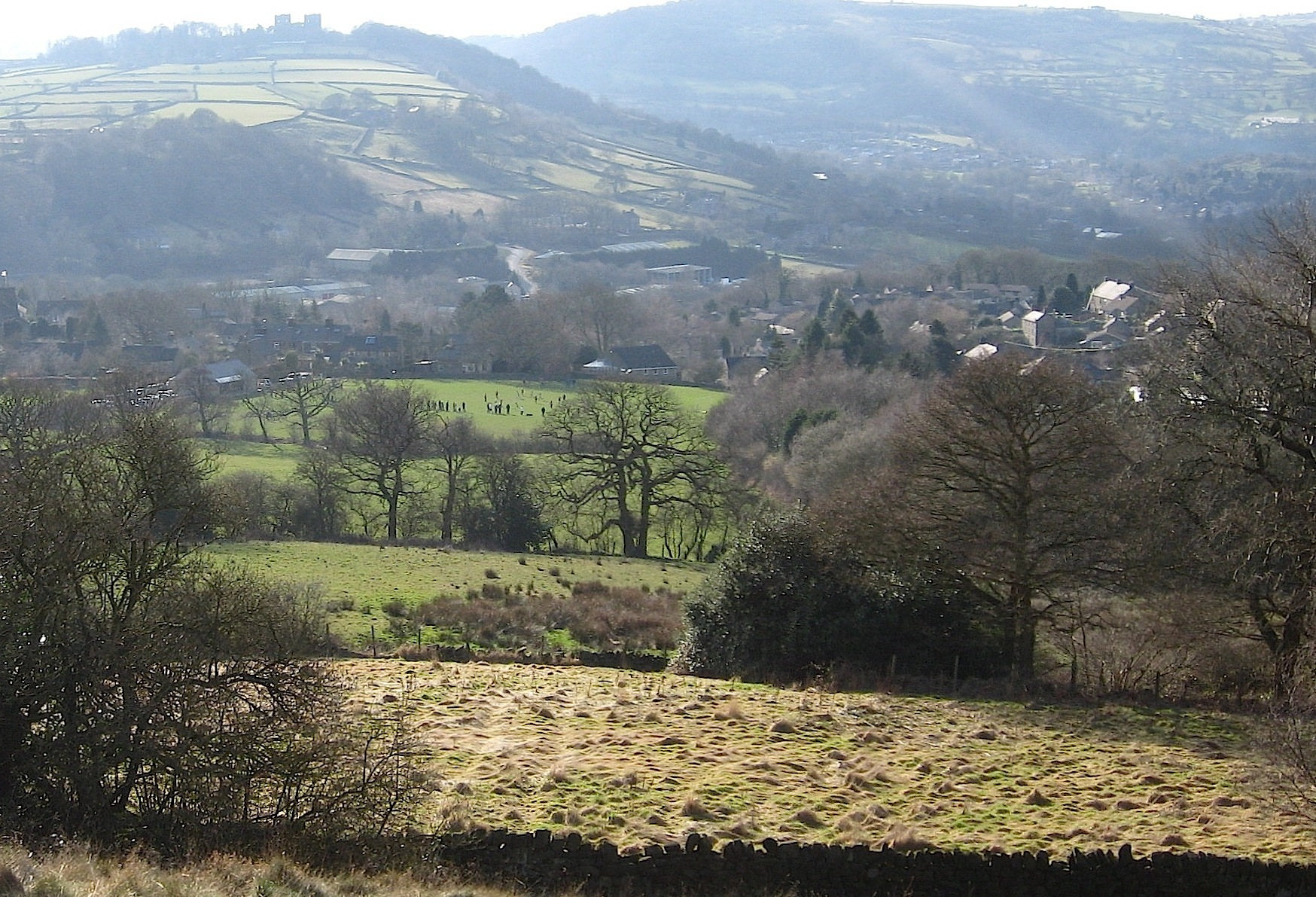
Late winter view of village from Mooredge, northeast

== Media ==
The Tansley Village Hall was used in Channel 4's How to Look Good Naked in 2009. Tansley was also used a filming location for Shane Meadows' 2004 film Dead Man's Shoes.

Tansley's communications network includes the Tansley Hotwire, a village e-mail service which distributes news and information to residents, and a website.

In February 2010 Tansley featured in the Sunday Times Property Section as a village that was "alive and kicking", one where community spirit still thrives.

== Community buildings ==
=== Anglican Church ===
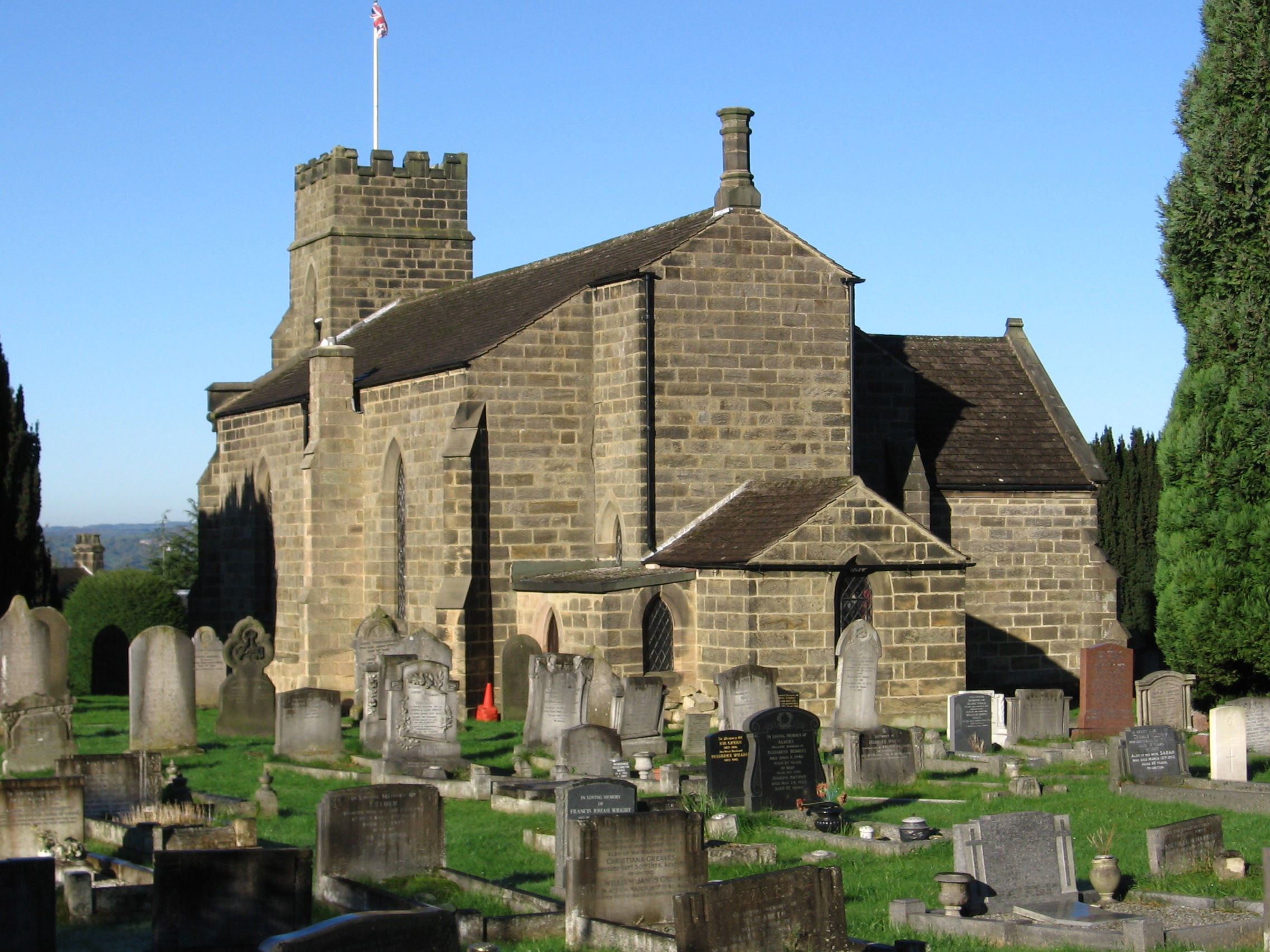
Holy Trinity Church

In 1839 Tansley was part of the parish of Crich. At that time it is recorded in a petition by the churchwardens and other parishioners of the parish of Crich that "the hamlet of Tansley contains a population of upwards of 500 souls and is distant from the Parish Church (of Crich) of four miles and that it is extremely inconvenient for the inhabitants of the said hamlet to attend divine service in the said parish of Crich, and in order to provide some church accommodation and aid for spiritual wants of the people residing therein considerable funds have been raised by voluntary contributions together with other grants to build a chapel".

The church was started in 1839, built of stone quarried locally, and opened 1 year later dedicated to the Holy Trinity.

By the middle of the 1860s, Matlock Bank, just over a mile away, had become popular with visitors coming to take the waters and although Holy Trinity church was large enough for local residents, it was not big enough to cope with additional visitors from Matlock Bank. The church was enlarged in 1870 by adding a North Aisle. New pews replaced the box pews and the altar area was changed. It was recognised that the addition of one aisle “ ..... produced an oddity but it is intended to add a corresponding wing should further accommodation be necessary". In the event, it obviously did not prove to be necessary.

=== Methodist Church ===
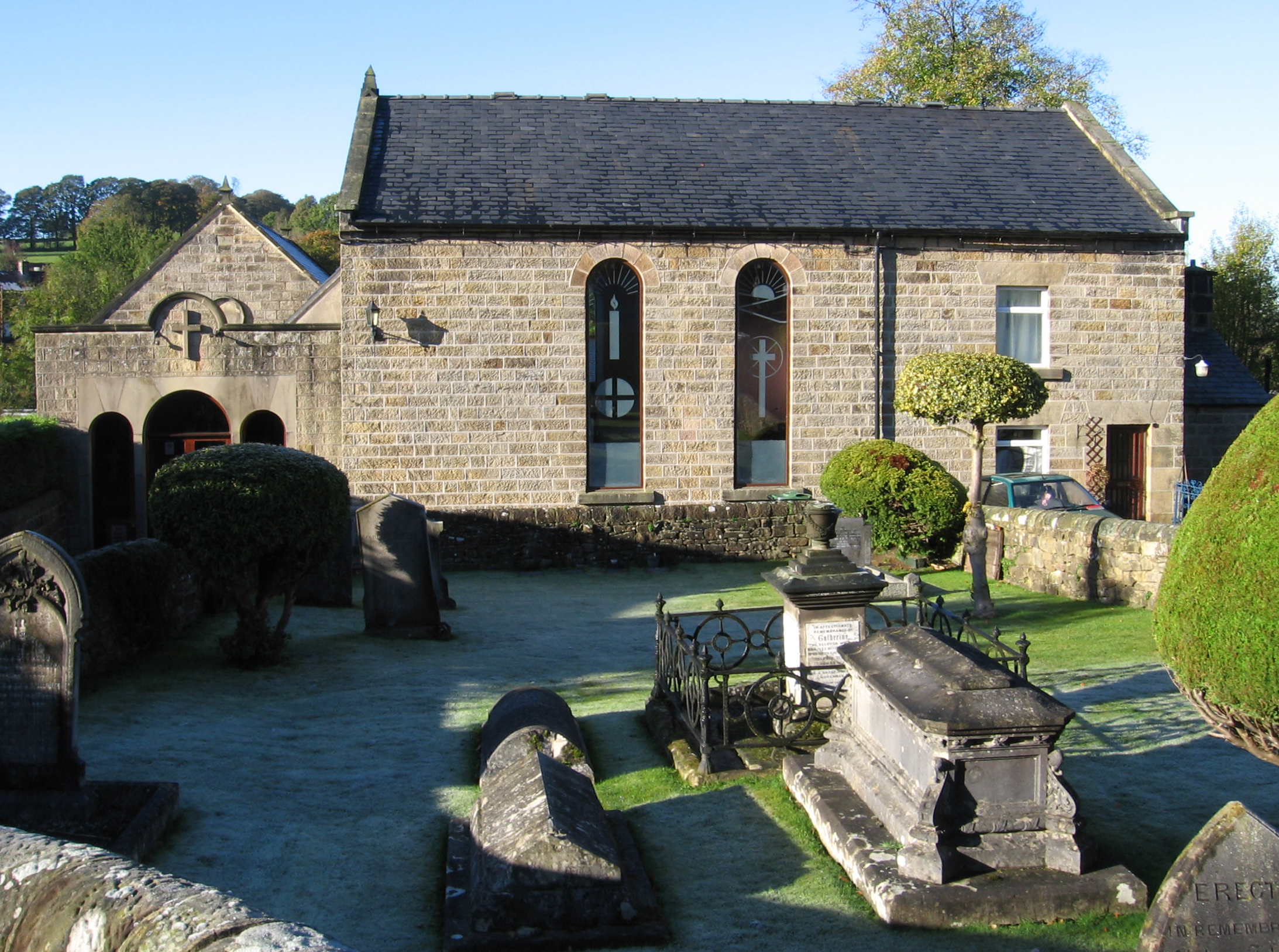
Methodist Church

The Methodist church was built in Church Street in 1829, 11 years before the Anglican church (Holy Trinity).

It replaced the smaller old Chapel, an octagonal building at The Knoll, built in 1811 on the site of a former cockfighting pit.

The present church has been modernised in recent years. It has its own schoolroom behind it.

=== Village Hall ===
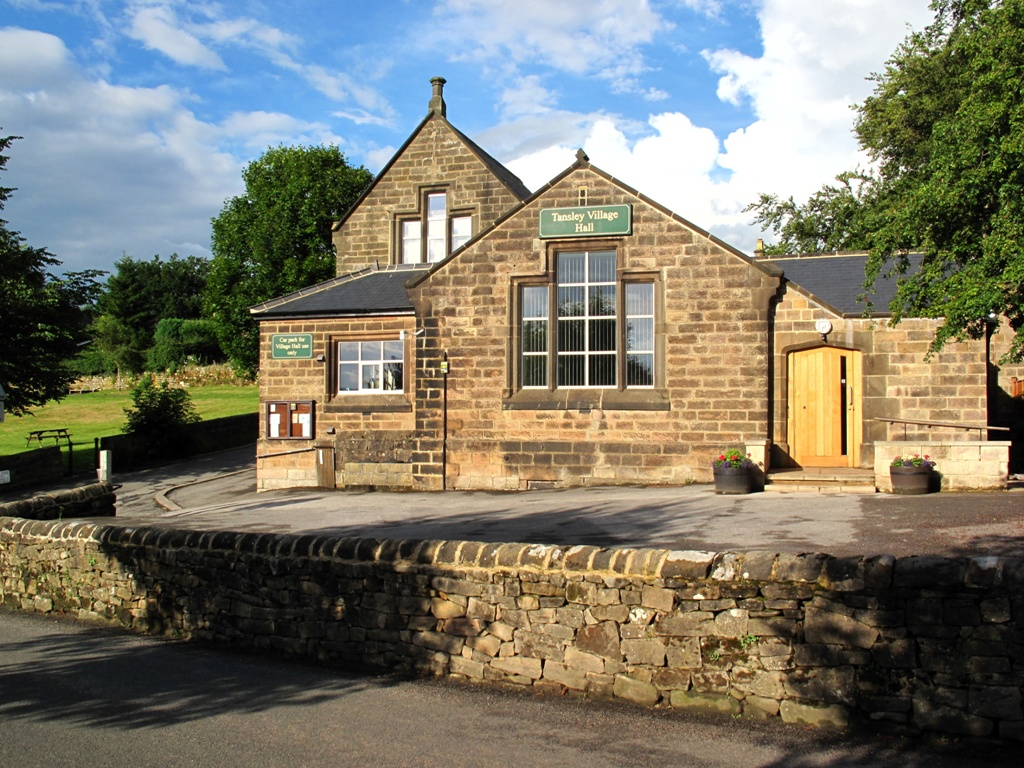
Tansley Village Hall

Tansley Village Hall is located next to Tansley village green. It is a popular venue for clubs, groups, parties and events. It is home to Tansley Film, hosts live comedy and musical shows (including Live & Local), and provides a meeting place for Tansley Ladies Group, Tansley Garden & Countryside Club, Tansley Tuesday Club, Tansley Players (drama group), an art group, yoga, pilates, Zumba, tai chi and pre-school children's cookery classes.

The hall, opened in 1843, was used as a school until 1949.

The hall (as of February 2014) has been substantially renovated since July 2010. It has had a new entrance, with oak door and disabled access, new toilet facilities, a new ground floor roof with a skylight, a new upper floor roof, new windows, internal renovation and redecoration of the main hall, bar area and small meeting room (with kitchen) and new curtains and blinds.

=== Community Hall ===
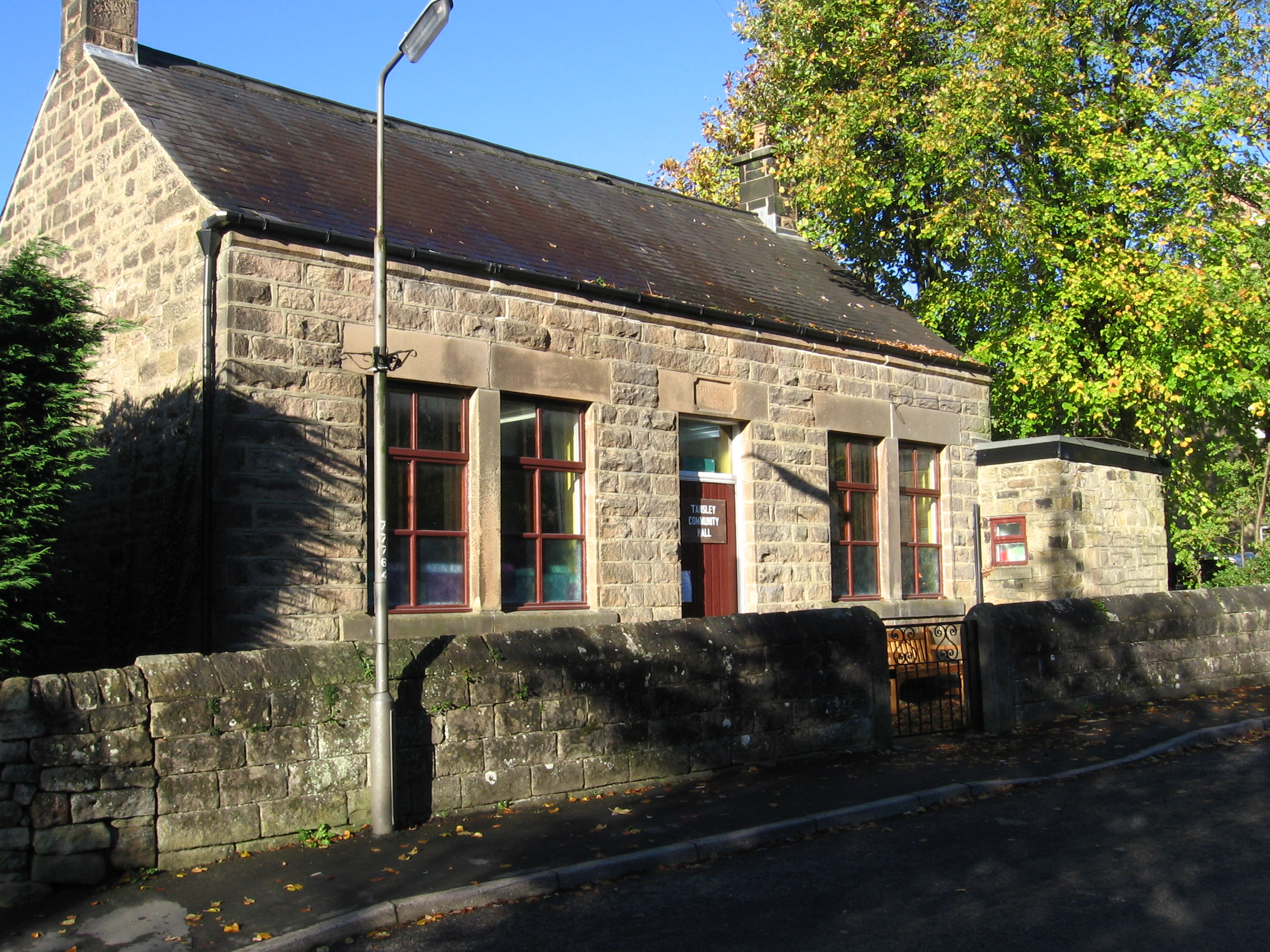
Community Hall

The Community Hall, at the lower end of Church Street, was built in 1887 as the Liberal Club when stones in the front wall were inscribed with the names of eminent men from the parish.

Its ownership was later transferred to the Parish Council, as seen by the inscription "Parish Building" over the entrance. The Parish Council sub-let it in 1906 to the Tansley Institute as a Reading Room, to replace the one within The Church School. The institute also used it as a non-sectarian Adult Sunday School and for Technical Education. Later it was also used for general recreation such as snooker and billiards and a youth club.

== Sport ==
Tansley is home to Tansley Juniors Football Club, a charter standard club who currently have around 10 teams ranging from U7s to Seniors. The club has the first Under-21 football team within the Derbyshire Dales.

The village is the site of the headquarters of the British Orienteering Federation.
