= Thomas Mellor =

Thomas or Tom Mellor may refer to:

- Thomas Barker Mellor (1849–1915), English photographer and organist
- Thomas Walton Mellor (1814–1902), British cotton manufacturer and politician
- Tom Mellor (ice hockey), American ice hockey player
- Tom Mellor (songwriter), English songwriter
