= Holy Trinity Church, Tansley =

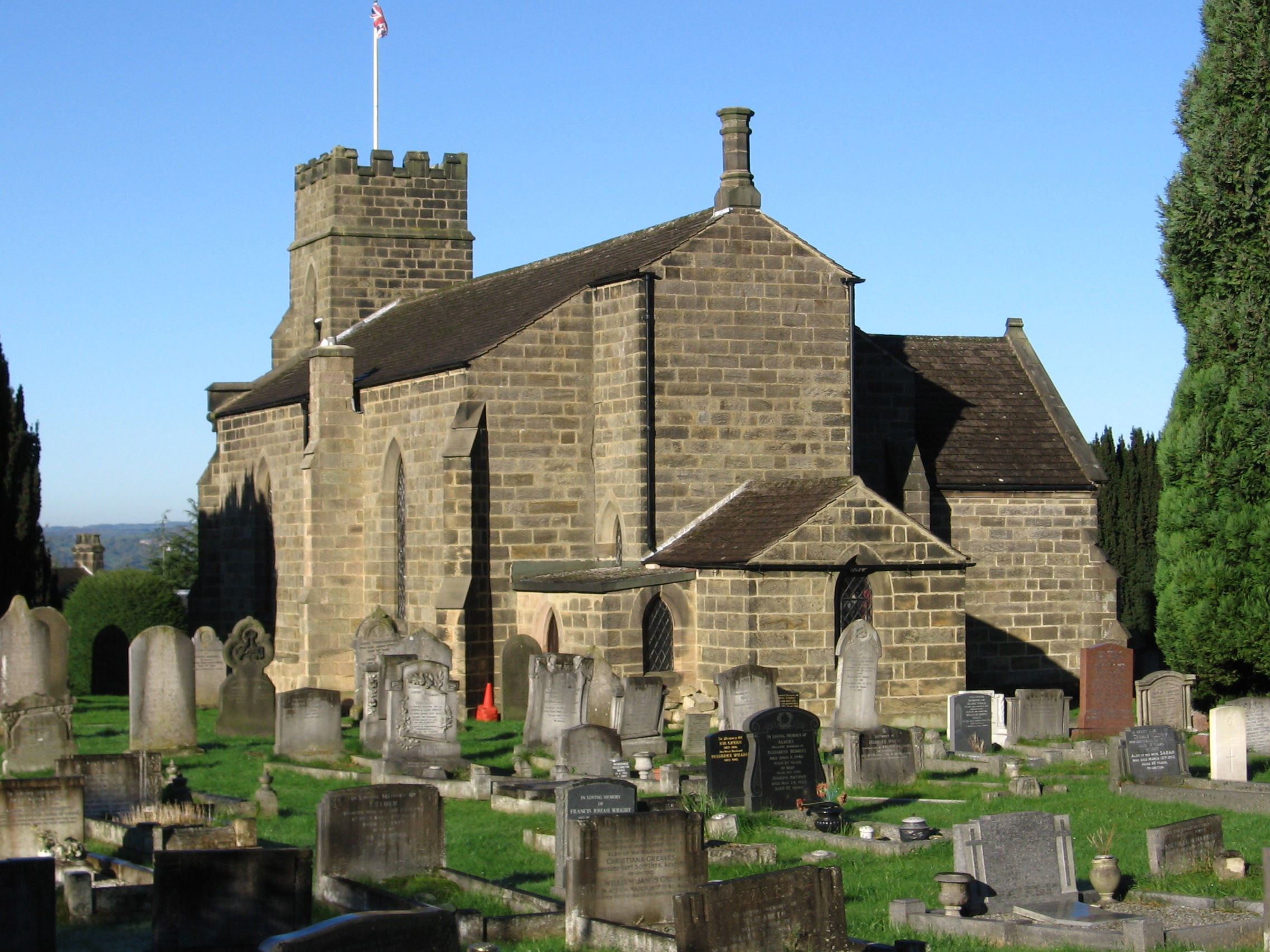
- Holy Trinity Church, Tansley

- Location within Derbyshire
- 53°08′7.5″N 1°31′9″W
- OS grid reference: SK 32265 59912
- Location: Tansley, Derbyshire
- Country: England
- Denomination: Church of England

History
- Dedication: Holy Trinity
- Consecrated: 18 September 1840

Architecture
- Architect: John Mason
- Groundbreaking: 1 May 1839

Administration
- Province: Canterbury
- Diocese: Derby
- Archdeaconry: Chesterfield
- Deanery: Carsington
- Parish: Tansley

Holy Trinity Church, Tansley is a parish church in the Church of England in Tansley, Derbyshire.

== History ==
The foundation stone was laid on 1 May 1839 by Sir George Harpur Crewe, Bart, MP in the presence of Revd. Thomas Carson, vicar of Crich, and Archdeacon Hodgson. A seraphine was played by Mr. Kidd, the organist of Cromford Chapel. A bottle was placed in the foundation containing coins of the present reign, with a list of subscribers to the church.

The church was built to the designs of the architect John Mason of Derby. It was consecrated by the Bishop of Lichfield on 18 September 1840

A north aisle was added in 1870 by the architects Stevens and Robinson of Derby.

== Parish status ==
The church is in a joint parish with

- All Saints' Church, Matlock Bank

== Organ ==
The pipe organ was installed by Forster and Andrews in 1850. It was a second hand barrel organ by Flight and Robson of 1836 from All Saints’ Church, South Elkington. In 1897 it was extended by John Stacey of Derby. A specification of the organ can be found on the National Pipe Organ Register.
