= All Saints' Church, Matlock Bank =

All Saints’ Church, Matlock Bank
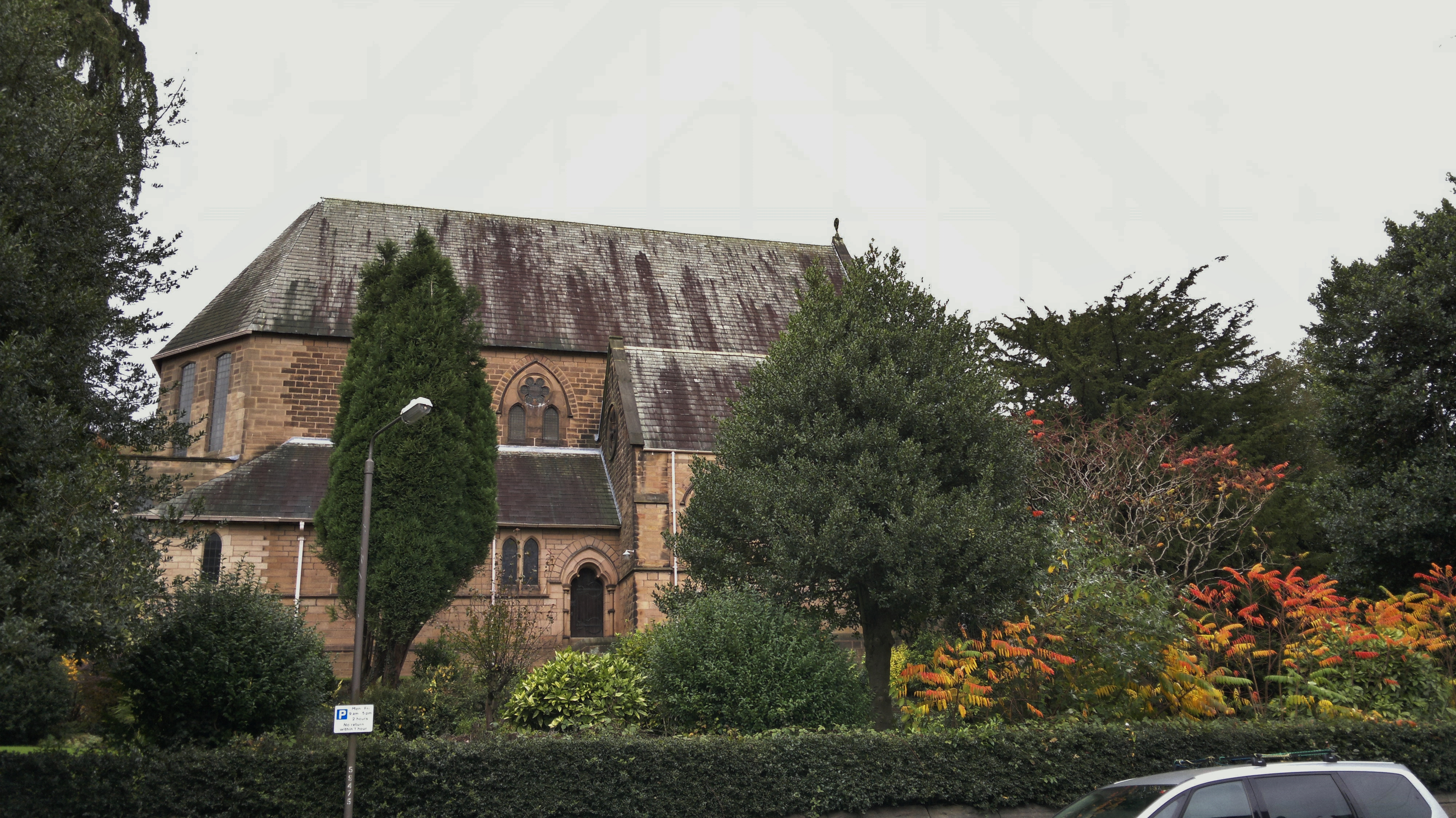
- All Saints’ Church, Matlock Bank

- Location within Derbyshire
- 53°08′37.3″N 1°33′19″W
- Location: Matlock, Derbyshire
- Country: England
- Denomination: Church of England
- Website: allsaintsmatlock.org.uk

History
- Dedication: All Saints
- Consecrated: 17 September 1884

Architecture
- Heritage designation: Grade II listed
- Architect: Thomas Henry Healey
- Groundbreaking: 31 August 1882
- Completed: 15 April 1884

Administration
- Province: Canterbury
- Diocese: Derby
- Archdeaconry: Chesterfield
- Deanery: Carsington
- Parish: Matlock

All Saints’ Church, Matlock Bank is a Grade II listed parish church in the Church of England in Matlock, Derbyshire.

== History ==
A mission room and school was designed by Mr. Skedward of Sheffield and opened on 17 August 1875 by Captain Augustus Arkwright, M.P.

The mission room was quickly found to be inadequate, so funds were raised for the construction of a new church. The foundation stone was laid on 31 August 1882 by Mr. F.C. Arkwright J.P. of Willersley Castle, in the presence of the Bishop of Lichfield. and the church was built to the designs of the architect, Thomas Henry Healey of Bradford.

The church was opened by the Bishop of Lichfield on Easter Tuesday, 15 April 1884 and formally consecrated by the Bishop of Southwell, Rt. Revd. George Ridding on 17 September 1884

The original plan was to construct a much larger church, but only the chancel and part of the nave were completed. A west front was added in 1958.

An old priest hole, running from the church to the nearby Infant’s School, then on to the site of the Junior School is still in use today, although much of the original run between the church and the Infant School is impassable. The tunnel is carved from the sandstone bedrock and was illuminated by gas-light. The tunnel is approximately 4ft high by approximately 2ft wide and only passable by smaller people.

== Stained glass ==
The church is noted for its stained glass windows, with an east window designed by Edward Burne-Jones of 1905 and a sequence of north aisle windows by Heaton, Butler and Bayne of 1907.

== Parish status ==
The church is in a joint parish with

- Holy Trinity Church, Tansley

== Organ ==
The pipe organ was built by Forster and Andrews and opened on 15 December 1886 by Thomas Barker Mellor of All Saints' Church, Bakewell. A specification of the organ can be found on the National Pipe Organ Register.

=== Organists ===
- John Goddard Barker 1889-92 (formerly organist of Holy Trinity Church, Matlock Bath, afterwards organist of All Saints' Church, Ashover)

== See also ==
- Listed buildings in Matlock Town
