= St Peter and St Paul and St Elizabeth Catholic Church, Coughton =

Catholic church in England

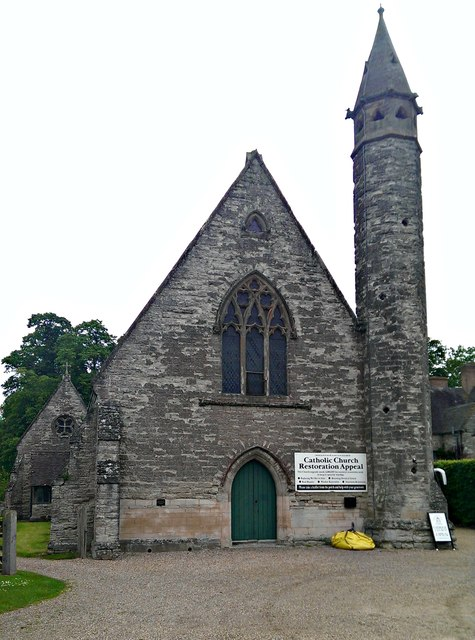
- Interactive map of St Peter and St Paul and St Elizabeth Catholic Church, Coughton
- Location: Coughton Court, Coughton, Warwickshire, England
- Coordinates: 52.2418°N 1.8789°W

Listed Building – Grade II*
- Official name: Roman Catholic Church of Saint Peter Paul and Elizabeth
- Designated: 11 December 1969
- Reference no.: 1355381

Listed Building – Grade II
- Official name: Former priest's house or presbytery
- Designated: 11 December 1969
- Reference no.: 1300459

St Peter and St Paul and St Elizabeth Catholic Church is a Catholic church built between 1851 and 1853 by the Throckmorton family in the grounds of their family home, Coughton Court. The church was commissioned by Sir Robert Throckmorton, 8th Baronet, in the years after the Catholic Emancipation Acts which would re-allow the profession of the Catholic faith officially for the first time since the Tudor period. The church currently holds Grade II listed status.

== History of the Church ==
The Throckmorton family had remained Catholic even after the formation of the Church of England and the break from Rome in the 1530s starting with the Act of Supremacy in 1534. The family had remained recusant Catholics, celebrating Mass in the saloon of Coughton Court, which acted as a chapel. Evidence of this recusancy are still evident in the house today. A double priest hole is present in the tower of the house, elucidating the role the house played in the celebration of the Catholic faith in this period. After the move towards Catholic emancipation, Sir Robert Throckmorton, 8th Baronet, commissioned the building of a new church on the grounds, after the original church on the estate had been re-dedicated to the Anglican faith. This was done to celebrate the new found freedoms for Catholics in Britain which included the ability to build non-Anglican places of worship in Britain.

The church was commissioned by Sir Robert Throckmorton, 8th Baronet, in the 1850s. This followed the movement towards Catholic emancipation in Britain after the ending of discriminatory rules and laws against Catholics. The house was built with an accompanying presbytery. The Catholic architect Charles Hansom was chosen to design the church. He was the brother of J A Hansom, designer of the Hansom cabs. Hansom designed the church with a notably thin tower, which is based upon Irish church architecture. The original plans for the church are held with the Throckmorton papers in the Warwickshire Record Office. Stone for the church was quarried from the Throckmorton's estates. The church was only formally opened in 1857 to be used by the family and other Catholics within the area.

The northeast chapel also serves as the family pew, with a separate entrance. The carved stone pulpit and font date from the mid-1850s. The east window stained glass is by John Hardman between 1855 and 1862. The organ in the west gallery was built by Henry Bevington of London in around 1855.

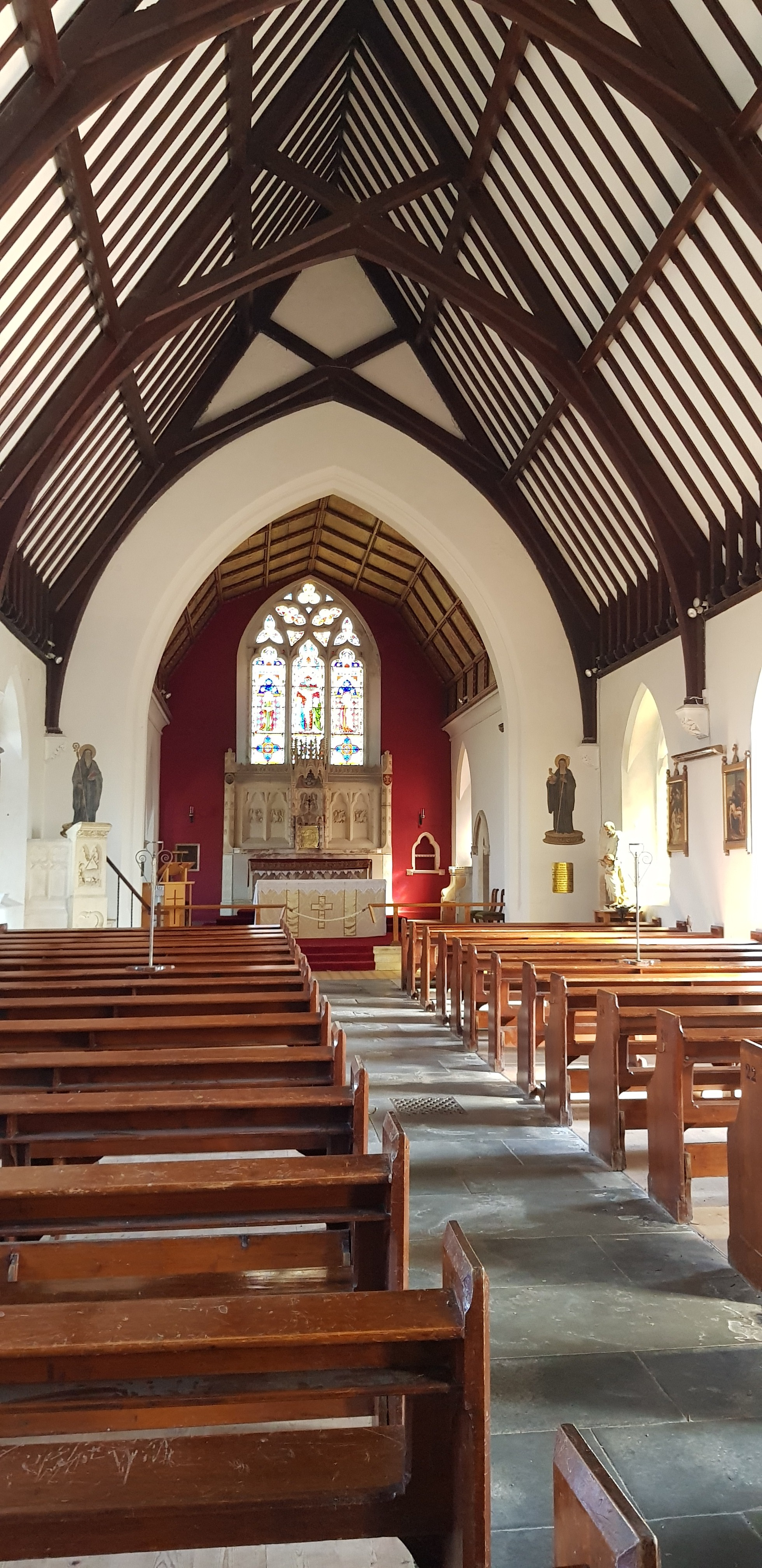
Interior of St Peter, St Paul and St Elizabeth, Coughton

== Present-Day Church ==
The Coughton Court estate was transferred to the care of the National Trust in 1946. The church is currently cared for in conjunction with the National Trust and the Catholic Historic Churches Trust, but is still recognised as being privately owned. The church hosts Masses, and is served by Our Lady and St Joseph Parish, Alcester. The church is recognised as being at risk by Historic England, with a number of issues which currently need addressing. The owners of the church have however expressed a desire to address these issues.

The church contains the Stations of the Cross, as well as a number of statues including ones which depict the Virgin Mary. A set of images adorns the ceiling above the altar. The sanctuary of the church was remodelled during the 1960s to fit the new liturgy of the Mass introduced following the Second Vatican Council. This included the reordering of the sanctuary and the moving of the altar to allow the priest to face the congregation.
