= Bentley Brook =

Coordinates: 53°08′33″N 1°31′57″W

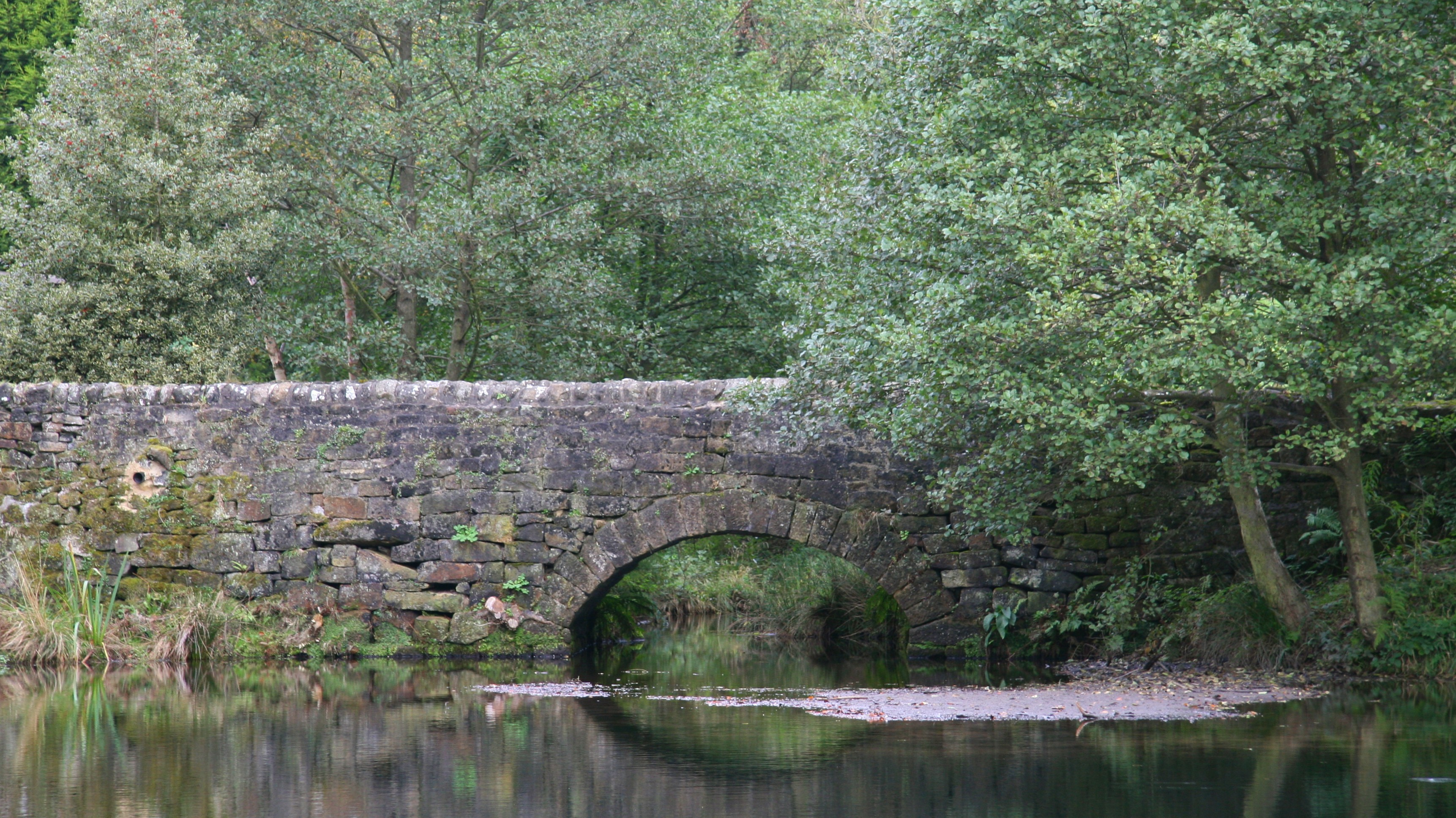
- Bridge carrying Oaksedge Lane over Bentley Brook as it enters the reservoir

Location
- Country: England
- Region: Derbyshire

Physical characteristics
- Source
  - location: Matlock Moor, England
- Mouth
  - location: Derbyshire, England

Bentley Brook is a stream in Derbyshire, England. It rises on Matlock Moor, flowing south through Cuckoostone Dale, under the A632, into Lumsdale, gathering the valley's waters—notably from Knabhall Brook, out of Tansley, itself dammed and supporting large mills. In Lumsdale it enters a now disused mill pond or reservoir, then flows over a waterfall in the course of passing several historical mill ruins. Finally, it runs through control gates into the outside bend of a tight oxbow of the River Derwent, just beyond Hall Leys Park in Matlock. Although only about five miles in length, Bentley Brook is classed as a 'main river' by the Environment Agency.

== Water mills ==
The Brook, formerly called "Lums", flows through the wooded gorge of Lumsdale Valley and is notable for being the site of six now disused water wheels and three mill ponds – "perhaps the most concentrated evidence of early water power in Great Britain." The power of the stream was harnessed by generations of mills in the valley, operating over several centuries. In now overgrown ruins, Bone Mill can be dated to the 16th century, and was used to grind animal bones for fertiliser up to the 1920s. Its wheel pit still remains, as does the tailrace leading back into Bentley Brook. Past the Pond Cottages (originally for lead smelting) and a footbridge is a picturesque pond, held by the Lower Dam, which was built in 1830 to harness the Brook. This stone-lined reservoir features a central drain plug. From high on its dam wall, a still-visible metal pipe conducted water to the wheel of the adjacent, second mill, dating from 1850, and still functioning as a sawmill at the turn of the 20th century. Visible below that and near the path, is a millstone imported from the Massif Central in France, originally in six sections bound in iron. Next below, now following steps and viewing platforms provided by the Arkwright Society in 1989, is "Paint Mill", mainly used to grind white barytes for the paint industry, which has been largely preserved by the Arkwright Society. It was also used to smelt lead, grind corn and bleaching. The fourth mill, beside the Brook's largest waterfall, dates from the 1770s and was used to grind corn and minerals.

Below the falls, a fifth mill on Bentley Brook, known as Upper Bleach Mill, retains remains of its bleaching vats. It was linked to the last of the mills, Garton Mill, by an ingenious train system, carrying heavy loads of cotton between the two. Garton Mill, the largest and most preserved of the six, was built around 1785 by Watts Lowe and Co for cotton spinning. Although the water system of the valley was altered to support it, this mill was not a commercial success, the company going bankrupt by 1813. The valley was then sold to John Garton, who converted the mill entirely to bleaching, and thus it functioned, along with other textile finishing mills, into the early 20th century. (A short walking guide for the above, with map, is available online, as are 360 degree moving panoramas.)

The power of Bentley Brook has carved an impressive series of waterfalls from the limestone, and has led to tragedy in the recent past. On 10 December 1965, heavy rain caused major flooding in Derbyshire, leading to three fatalities, including a 58-year-old railway worker, George Ellis, who was found dead in Bentley Brook in Matlock, two days after he had last been seen attempting to cross a flooded car park bordering the Brook. As W. Adam summarized this article in 1861, "We cannot help remarking on the terrible effects produced by this stream, when swollen into a mighty torrent. But of how much utility is this little busy stream in its gentleness, in turning so many mills, giving employment to so many busy hands, and thus in many ways contributing its quota of benefit to the well-being of man."

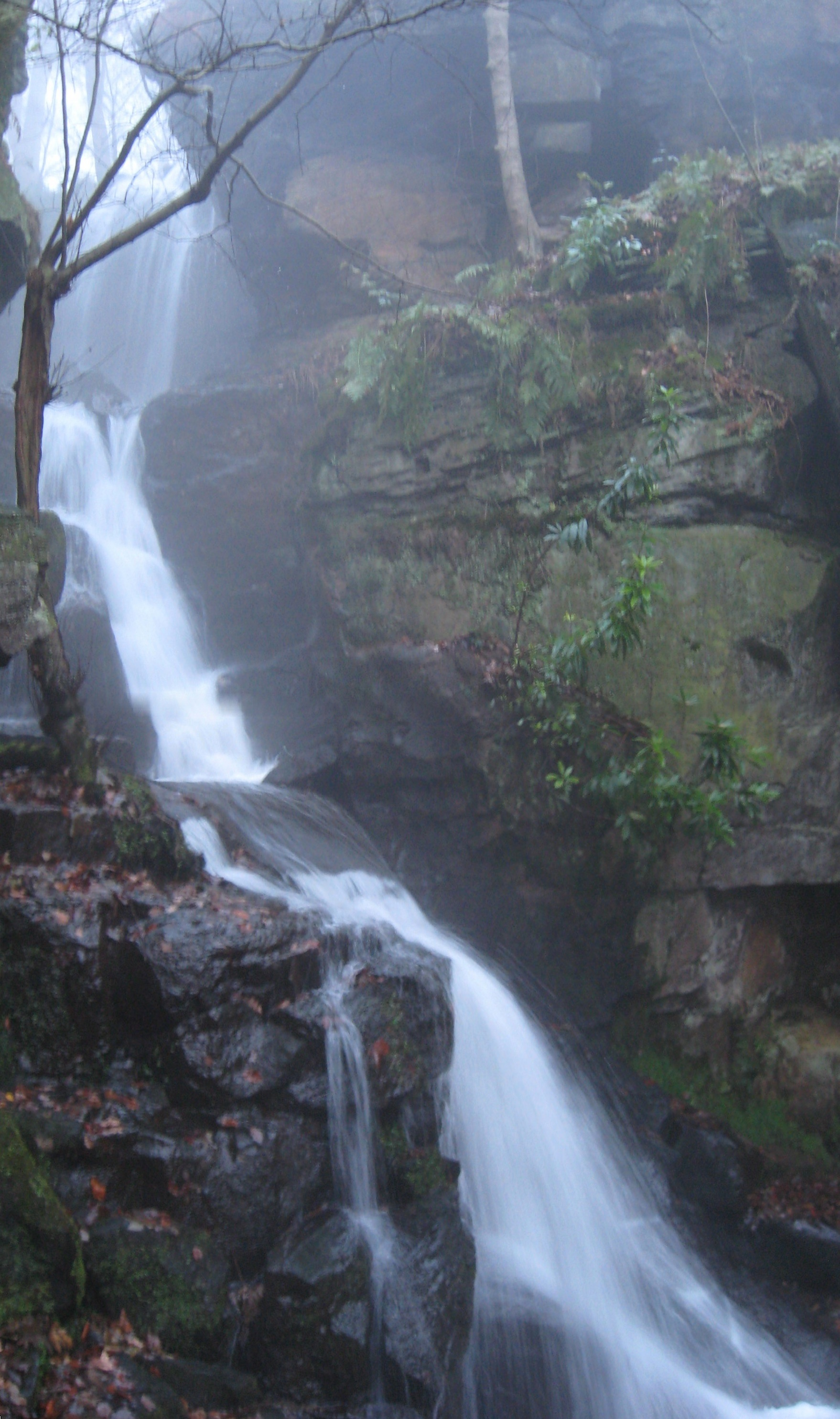
Falls above grinding mill, Matlock, nr Lumsdale Road

== Bentley Brook's course: illustrations to text ==
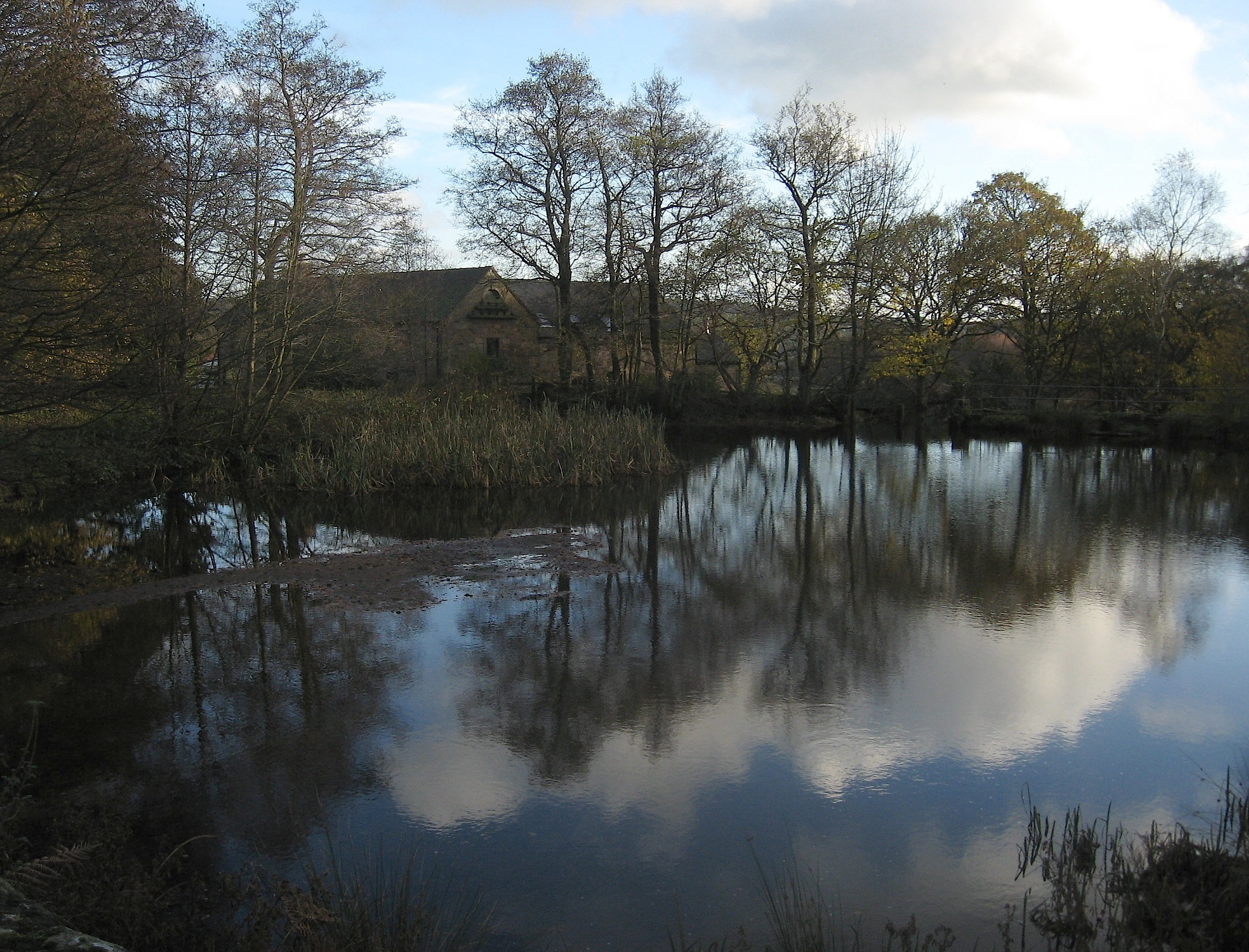
Third reservoir, 1830s, in old quarry

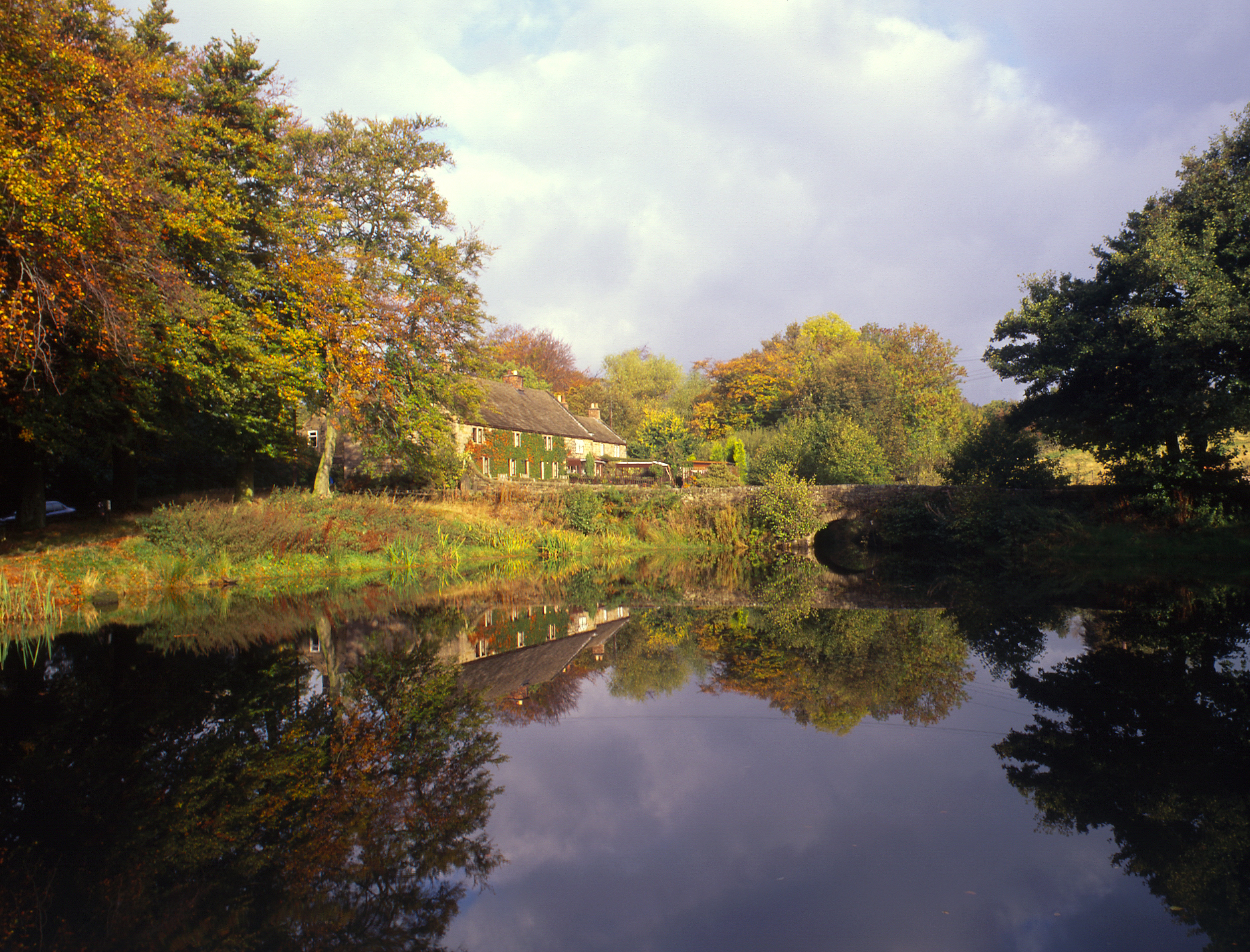
The third and only remaining pond; houses of former mill workers and bridge

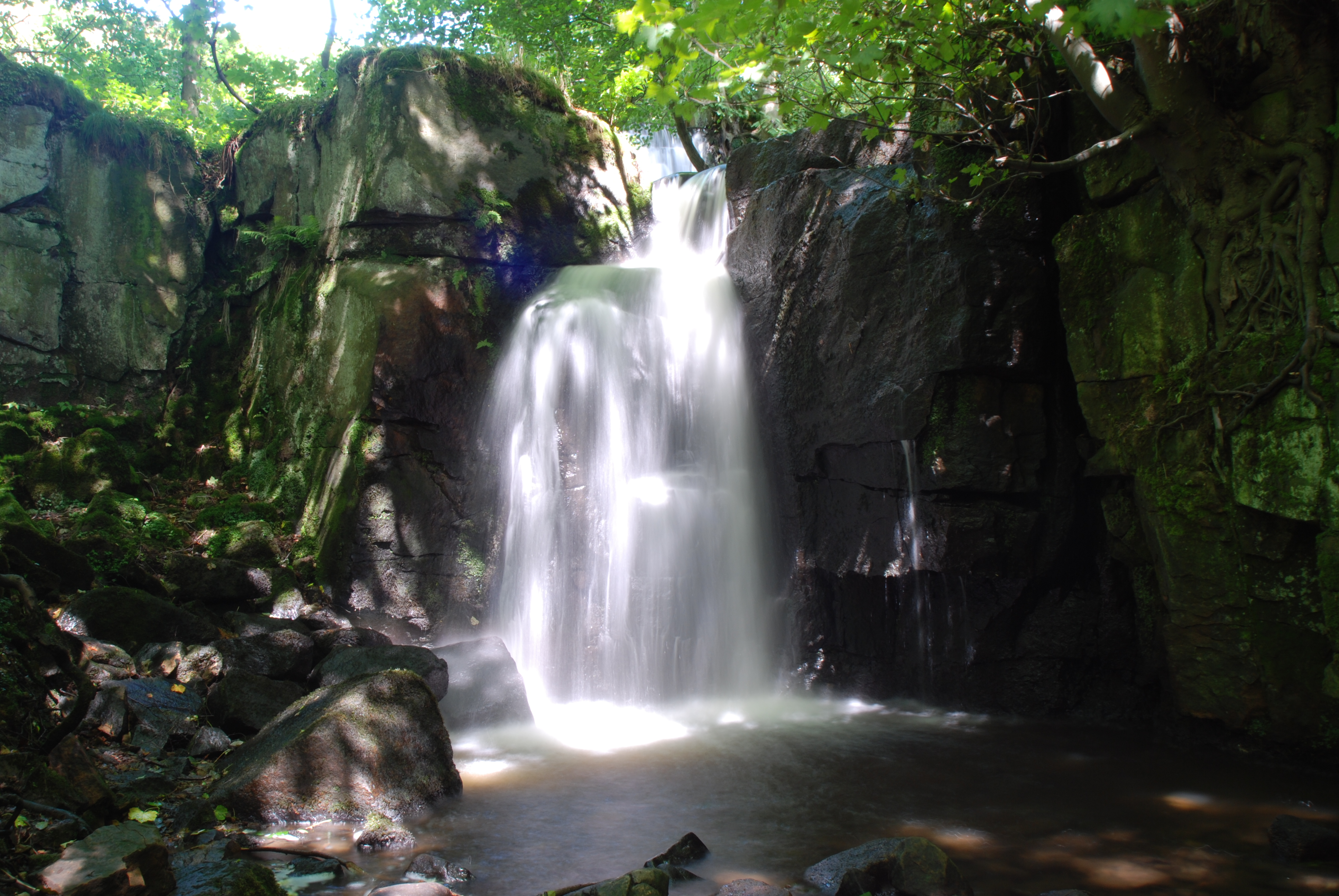
Waterfall issuing from third pond weir

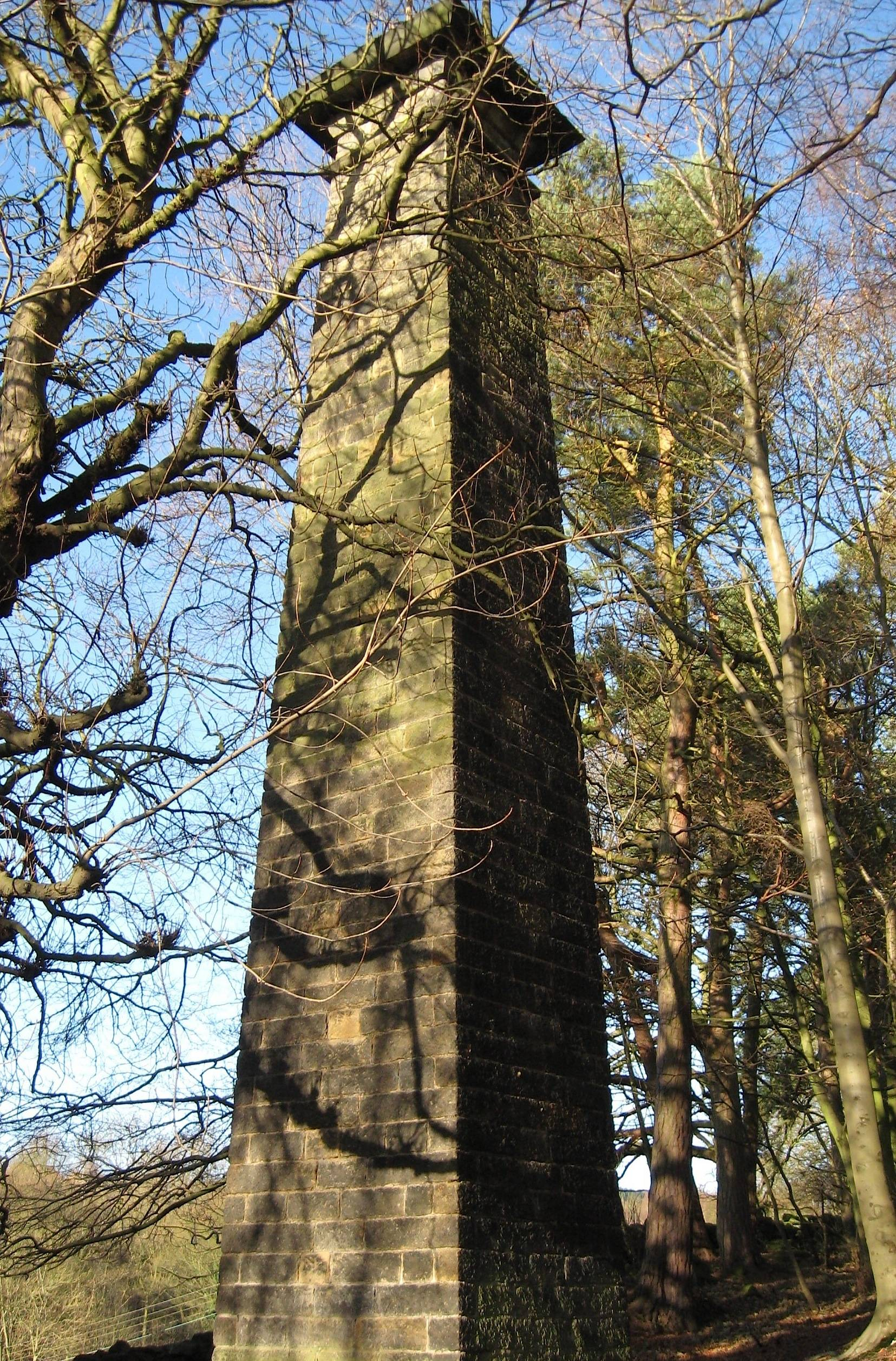
Chimney, whose flues vented upper mills

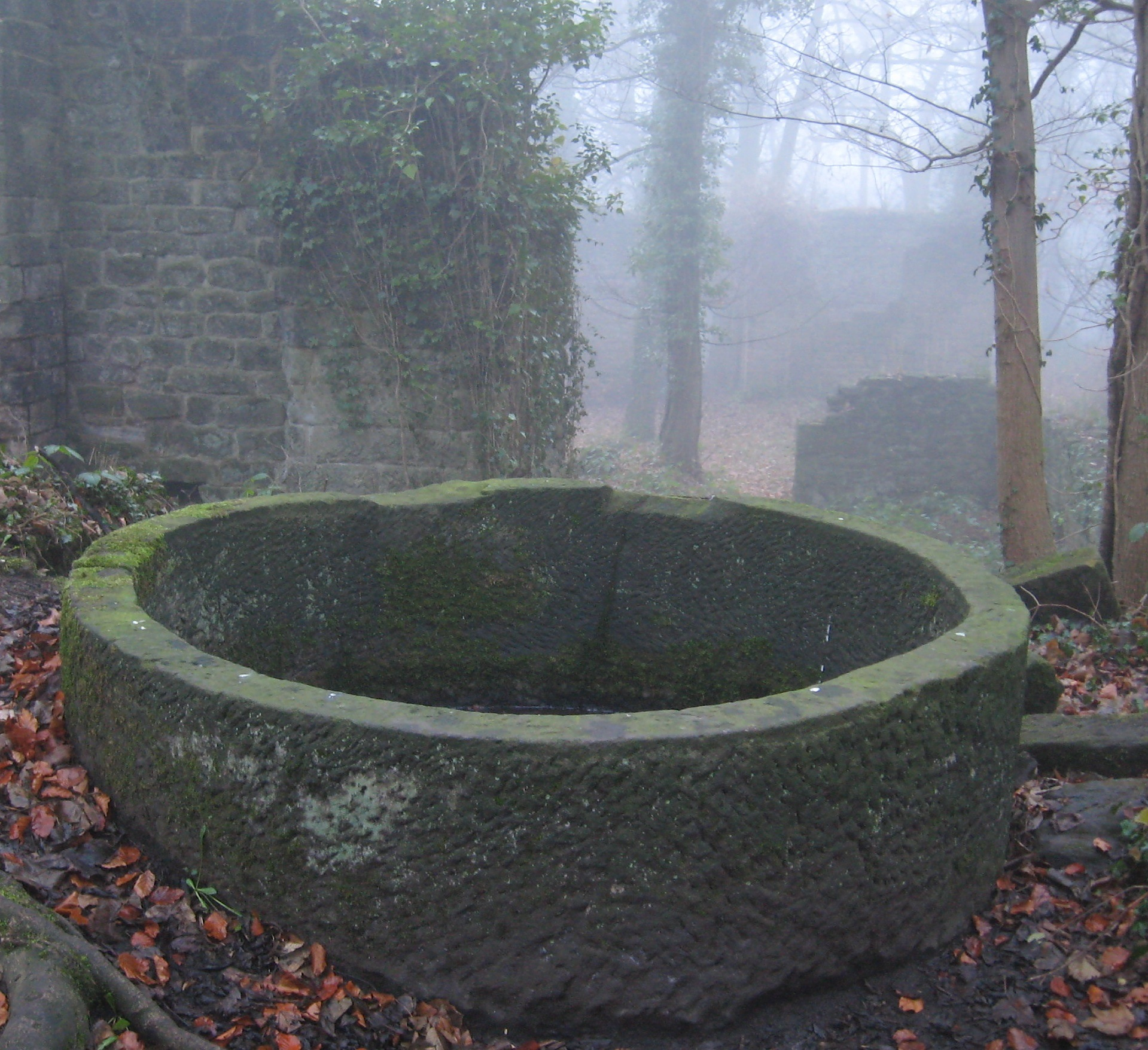
Single-stone bleaching vat, Saw Mill

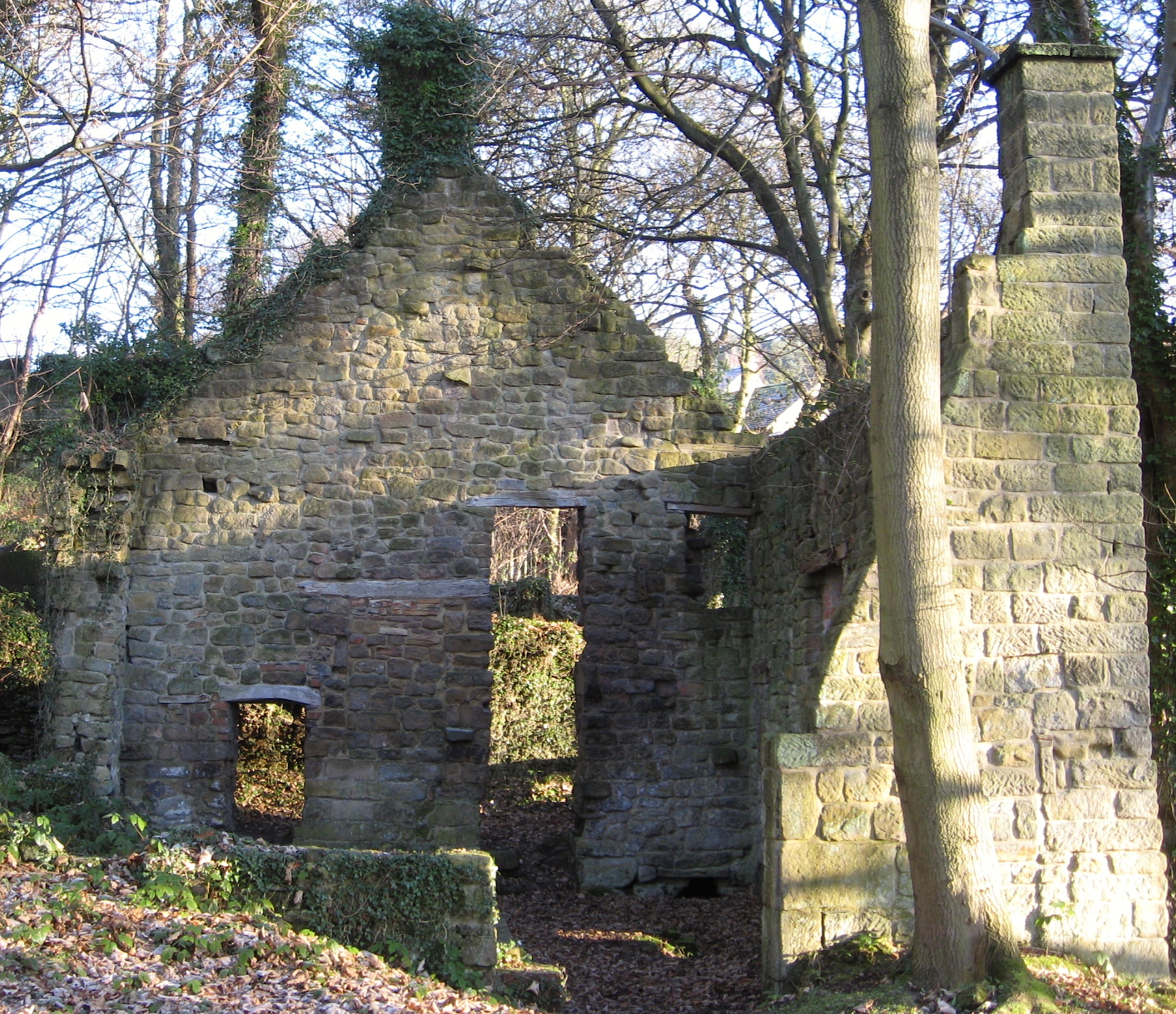
Paint Mill, south face

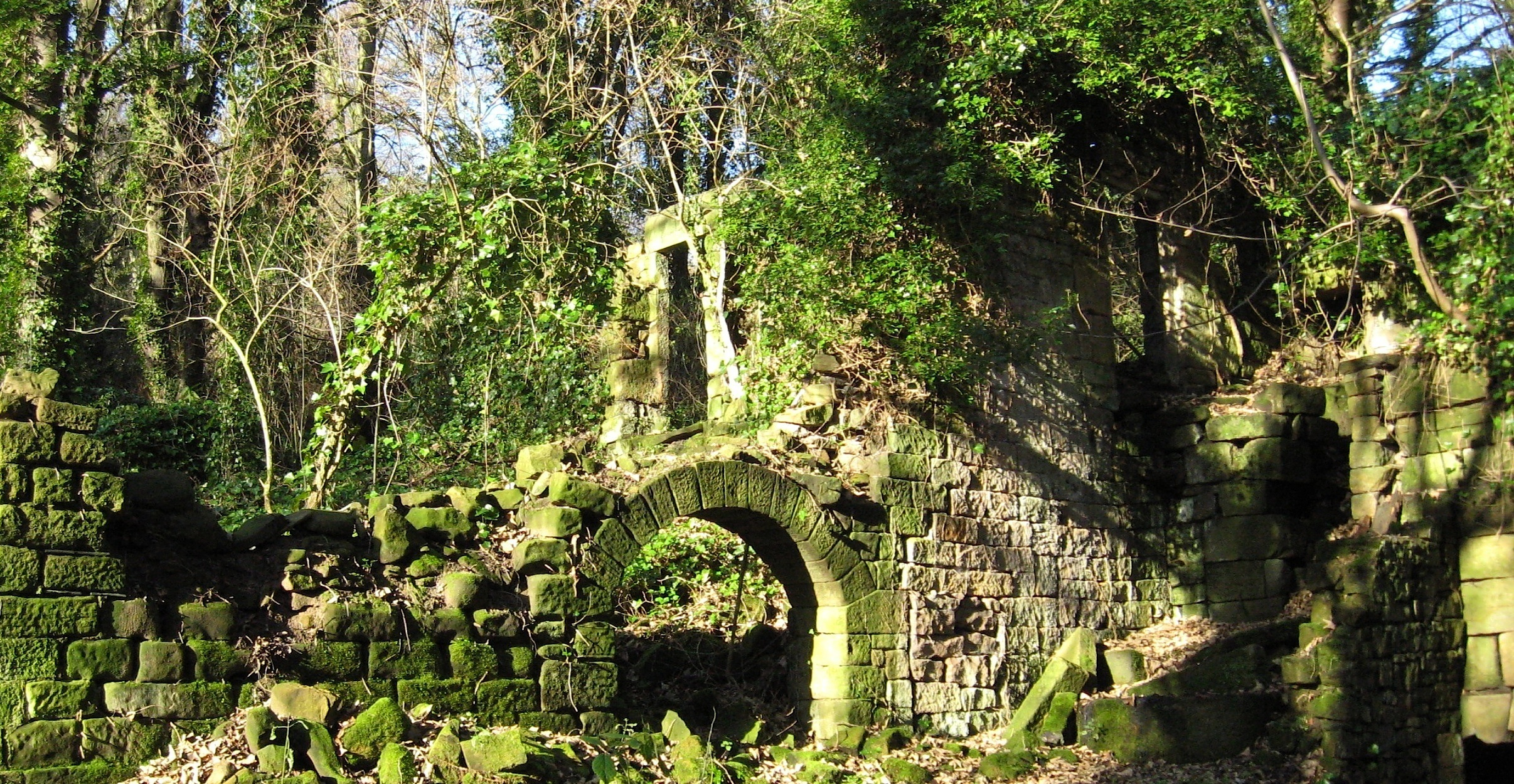
1770s corn & mineral Grinding Mill

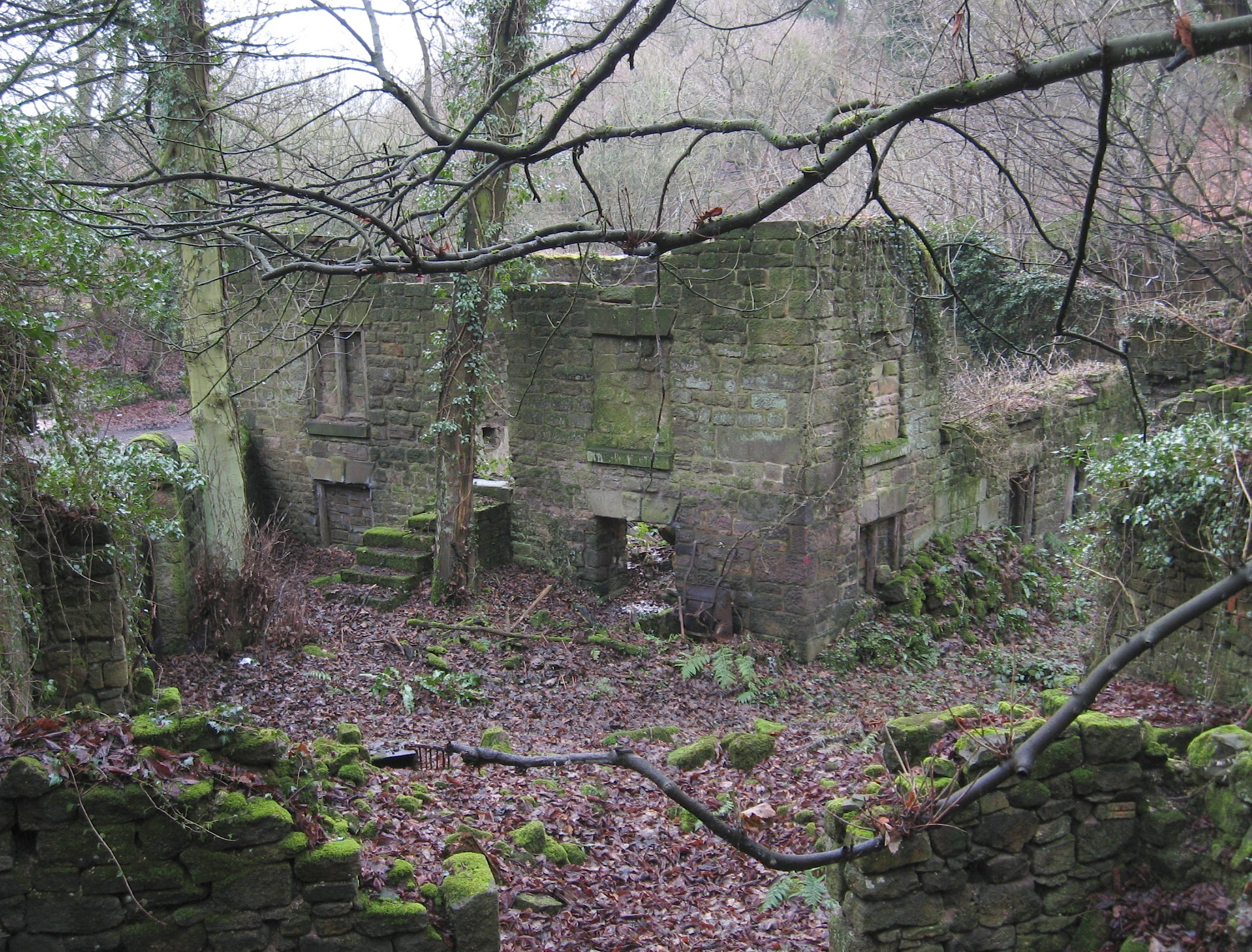
Garton Mill from east

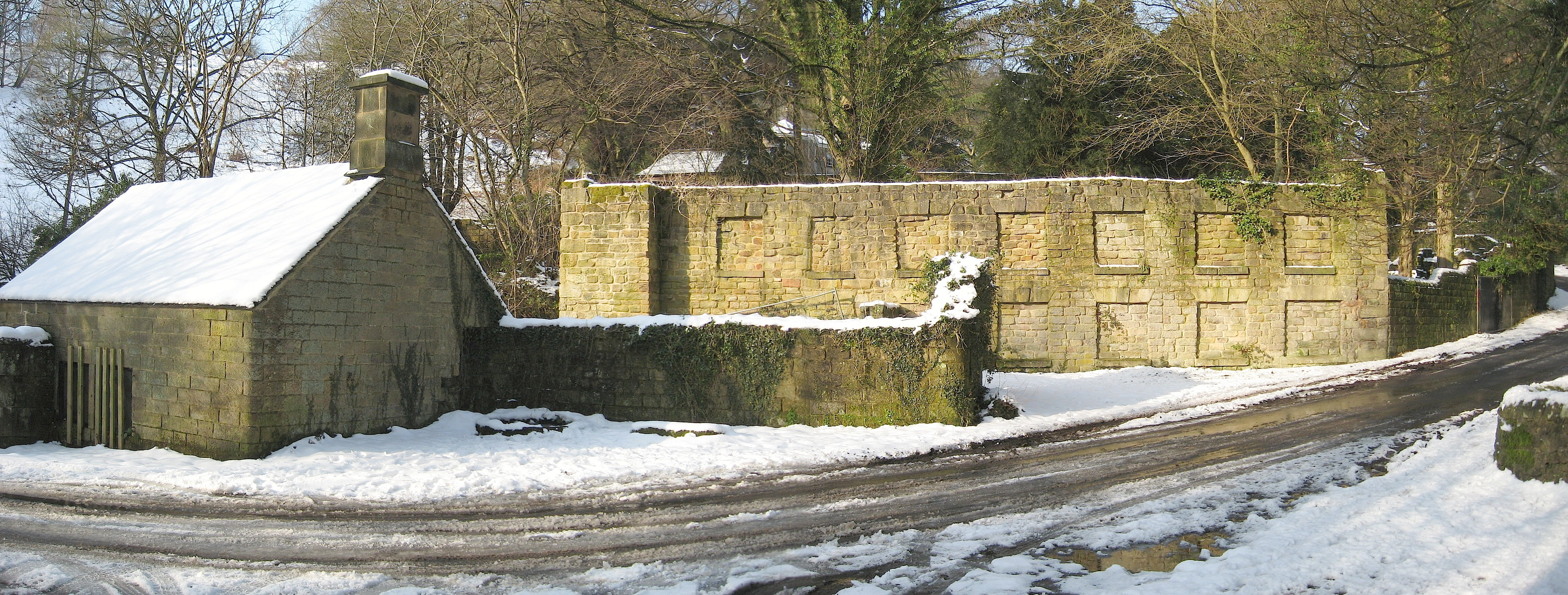
Garton Mill & smithy, Lumsdale Road

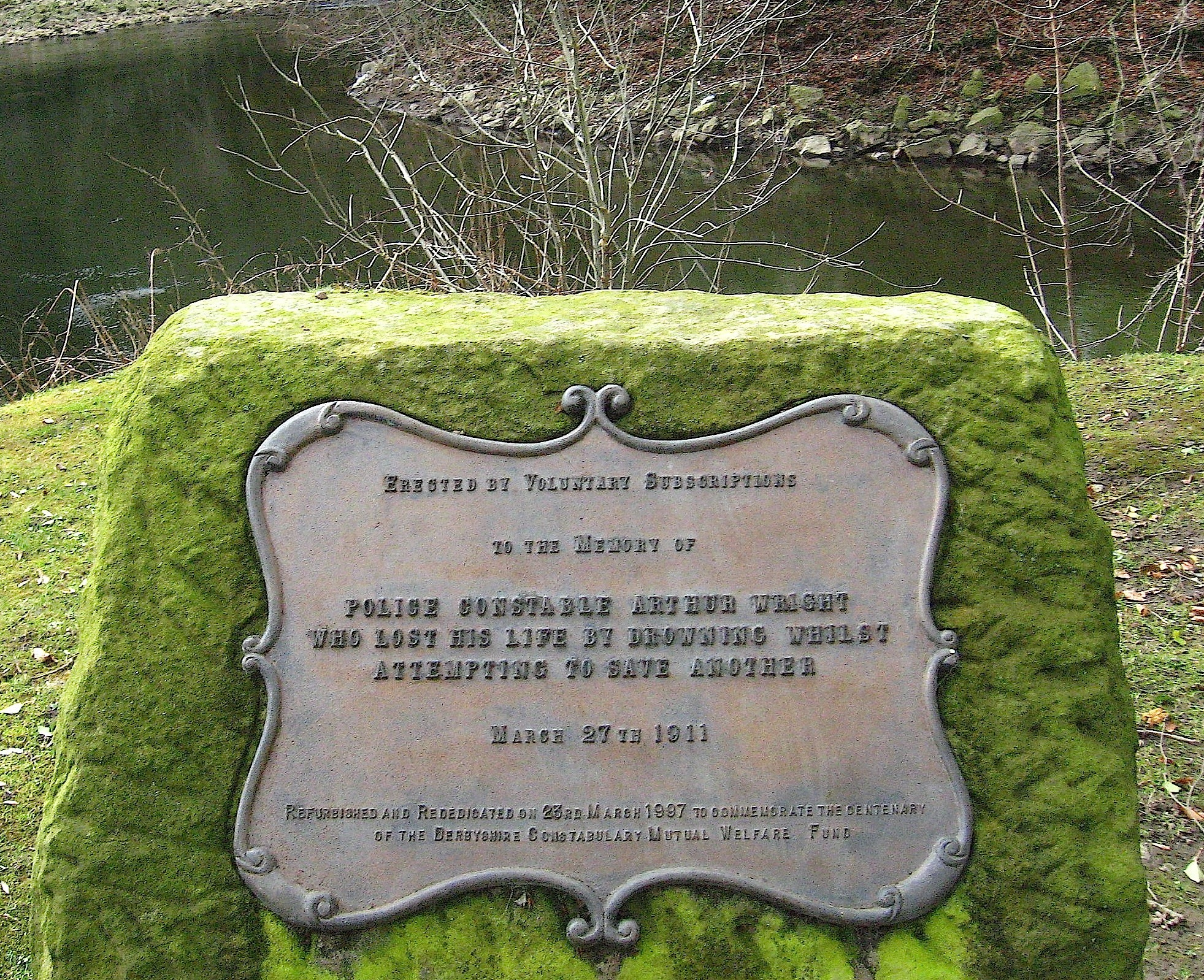
Constable Wright memorial, confluence of Brook & Derwent, Matlock

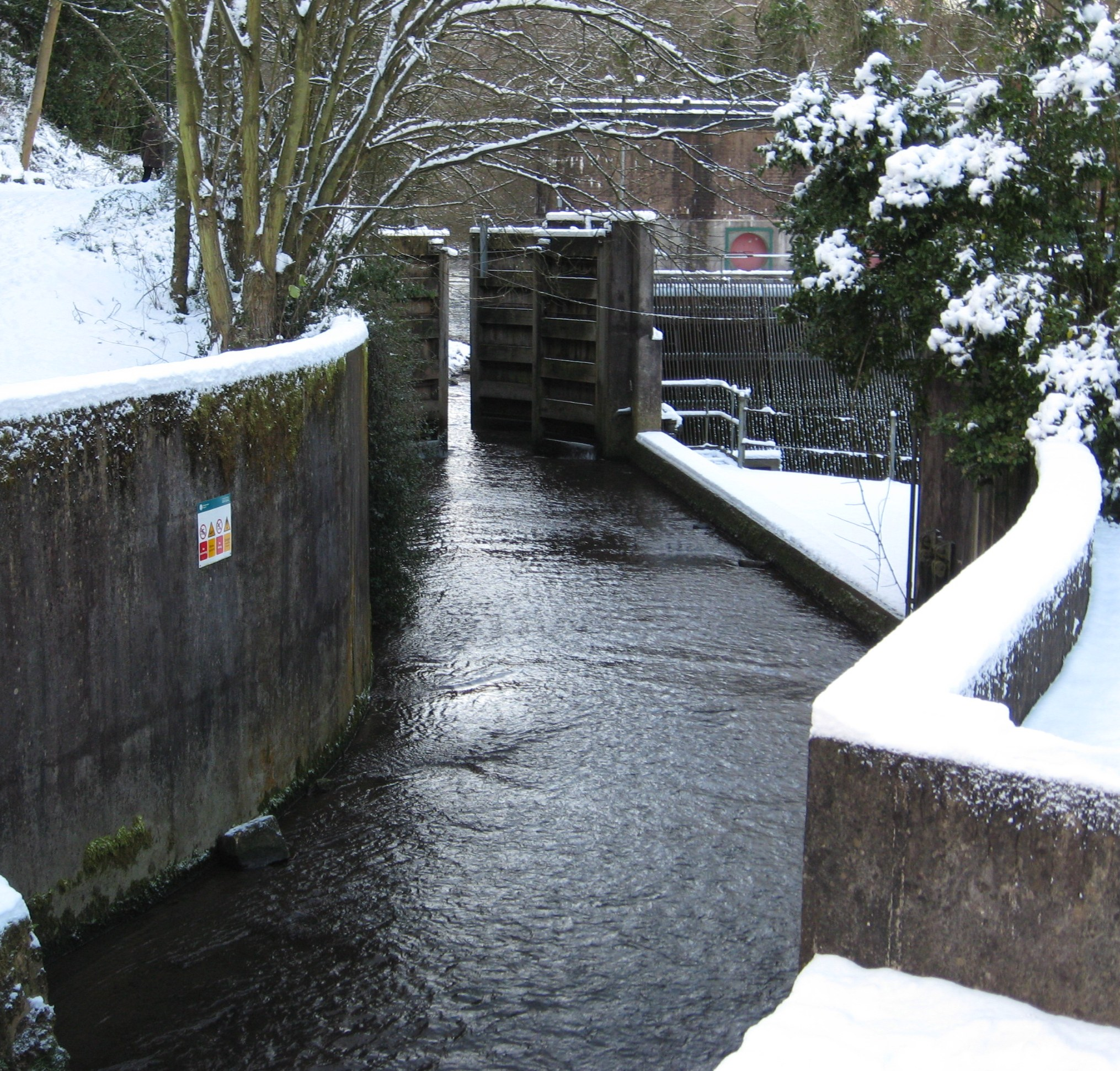
Watergate entry of Brook into bend of River Derwent, Matlock

== See also ==
- List of rivers in England
