= Listed buildings in Turnditch =

Turnditch is a civil parish in the Amber Valley district of Derbyshire, England, UK. The parish contains two listed buildings that are recorded in the National Heritage List for England. Both the listed buildings are designated at Grade II, the lowest of the three grades, which is applied to "buildings of national importance and special interest". The parish contains the village of Turnditch and the surrounding area, and the listed buildings consist of a church and a school.

== Buildings ==
Name and location	Photograph	Date	Notes
All Saints' Church; 53.01587°N 1.56098°W		1630	The church was enlarged and the chancel was rebuilt in 1882–84. It is built in gritstone and has a tile roof with coped gables. The church consists of a four-bay nave, a south porch, and a two-bay chancel with a vestry, and on the west gable is a gabled bellcote. The porch is gabled and has shallow buttresses, and a pointed arch with a hood mould.
Turnditch School; 53.01551°N 1.56095°W		1846	The clock turret was added in 1910. The school is built in red brick with stone dressings, and has a tile roof with coped gables. There is a single storey and a symmetrical plan, with a central gabled porch. The doorway has a quoined surround and a four-centred arched lintel, and in the gable apex is an inscribed and dated shield. Above the porch is a clock tower with weatherboarding, an arcaded timber bell stage, and a curved pyramidal cap with a weathervane. The flanking ranges contain mullioned cross windows with stepped surrounds. To the west is a gabled extension.
