= Henry Bevington =

English organist and organ builder (1777–1850)

- Born: 26 July 1777
- Died: 8 November 1850 (aged 73)
- Occupation: Organ builder

Henry Bevington (26 July 1777 – 8 November 1850) was a prolific English organ builder, active in London during the Victorian era. Many of his organs were erected in Australia and South Africa.

Bevington was born in London to Samuel and Elizabeth (Portsmouth) Bevington, who were Quakers. He was an apprentice of Ohrmann & Nutt, and also of John Snetzler. He began his trade as journeyman with Robert Gray. He set up his own workshop in Greek Street, Soho, London in 1794, his earliest recorded organ is dated 1820.

Bevington was also an accomplished organist and was the organist at King's College, London.

He died in 1850, aged 73, and was buried at St Peter's Church, Walworth.

== Bevington & Sons ==
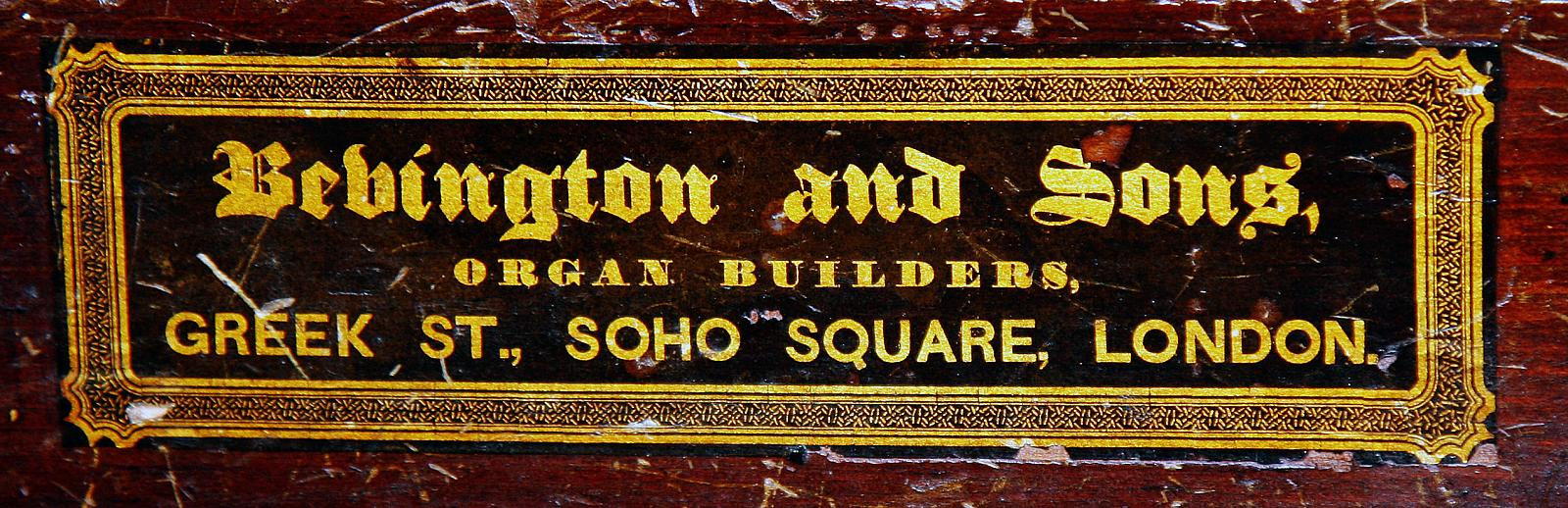

Bevington's organ building business was continued by his sons; Henry and Martin, in Rose Street, Soho, in the same premises as were occupied by Ohrmann. The organ of St. Martin's in the Fields and of the Foundling Hospital in London, and that of St. Patrick's Cathedral, Dublin, were built by the Bevington firm.

On 21 May 1854, a fire damaged his works on Rose Street, including the original carved case being constructed for St. Martin's in the Fields, and valuable tools. Fortunately, the majority of their inventory was at the Greek Street location.

== Some organs built by Bevington & Sons ==
- St. George's Cathedral, Cape Town (17 February 1861)
- The Foundling Hospital, London (1855)
- St Swithin's Church, Wickham (1851)
- St Peter and St Paul and St Elizabeth Catholic Church, Coughton (c.1855)
- Nottingham Mechanics' Institution (17 October 1849)
- St Mary's Cathedral, Sydney (c. 1838)
- St Michael and St George Cathedral, Grahamstown (1860)
- Church of St. John the Evangelist, Kensal Green (1846)
- The chapel at Stanbrook Abbey
- English College, Rome
- All Saints' Church, Turnditch 1891
- Parroquia de la Concepción, Santa Cruz de Tenerife (1862)
- All Saints' Church Dunedin 1877
- Hatley St George church, Cambridgeshire – a small Bevington organ of 1878
- St Thomas Church, Corstorphine - built 1843, now much altered from original concept
- St Peter's Church, Radford 1869
- Cathedral of the Good Shepherd - built 1912, now significantly altered

== See also ==
- George Fincham
- List of pipe organ builders

== Bibliography ==
- Boeringer, James; Freeman, Andrew (1989). Organa Britannica: Organs in Great Britain 1660-1860 : a Complete Edition of the Sperling Notebooks and Drawings in the Library of the Royal College of Organists. Bucknell University Press and the Royal College of Organists. ISBN 978-0-8387-1894-0.
- The Catholic Directory and Annual Register. 1838.
- van der Linde, Bernard (1993). "Book review, with special reference to the problem of the preservation of historically valuable South African organs". Ars Nova. 25 (1): 55–65. doi:10.1080/03796489308566511. ISSN 0379-6485.
- de Pontigny, Victor Dumazet (1900). "Bevington and Sons" . A Dictionary of Music and Musicians. Vol. 1.6. p. 546.
- Downes, Ralph; Sumner, William Leslie (1952). "The Organ". The Musical Times. 93 (1313): 311. doi:10.2307/935203. ISSN 0027-4666. JSTOR 935203.
- Kent, Christopher (1992). "Book Review: The Making of the Victorian Organ by Nicholas Thistlethwaite". Music & Letters. 73 (2). Oxford University Press: 299–301. doi:10.1093/ml/73.2.299. JSTOR 735949.
- Thistlethwaite, Nicholas (1999). The Making of the Victorian Organ. Cambridge University Press. ISBN 978-0-521-66364-9.
- Thistlethwaite, Nicholas (2000). "Bevington". In Stanley Sadie; John Tyrrell (eds.). The New Grove Dictionary of Music and Musicians. Groves Dictionaries. ISBN 978-1-56159-263-0.
