= Turnditch =

Village in Derbyshire, England

Coordinates: 53.014°N 1.564°W

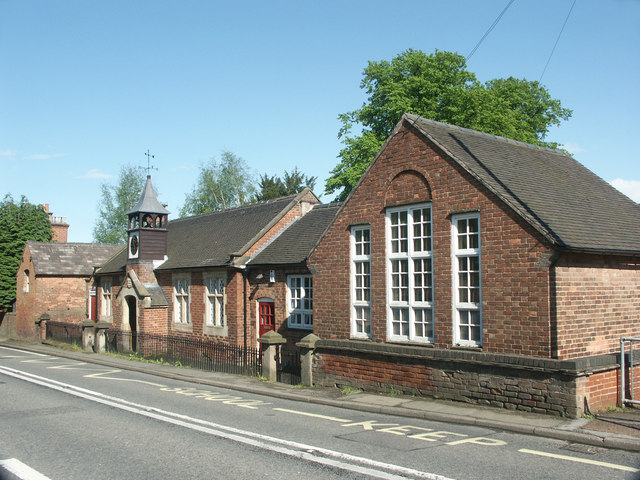
- School at Turnditch

- Location within Derbyshire
- Population: 301 (2011)
- OS grid reference: SK293463
- District: Amber Valley
- Shire county: Derbyshire
- Region: East Midlands
- Country: England
- Sovereign state: United Kingdom
- Post town: BELPER
- Postcode district: DE56
- Dialling code: 01773
- Police: Derbyshire
- Fire: Derbyshire
- Ambulance: East Midlands
- UK Parliament: Mid Derbyshire

Turnditch is a village and civil parish in the Amber Valley district of Derbyshire, England. The population of the civil parish at the 2011 Census was 301. It is around 10 miles (16 km) north of Derby on the A517 road from Belper to Ashbourne.

It is built on both sides of the road halfway up the steep climb out of the Ecclesbourne Valley. Nearer to the brow of the hill is a place known as Cross o' th' Hands.

In Norman times it was within Duffield Frith and part of the manor of Duffield. The Church of All Saints was built in the 13th century as a chapel of ease to Duffield, while a Congregational chapel with a Sunday school was erected in 1818.

== See also ==
- Listed buildings in Turnditch
