= All Saints' Church, Turnditch =

All Saints’ Church, Turnditch
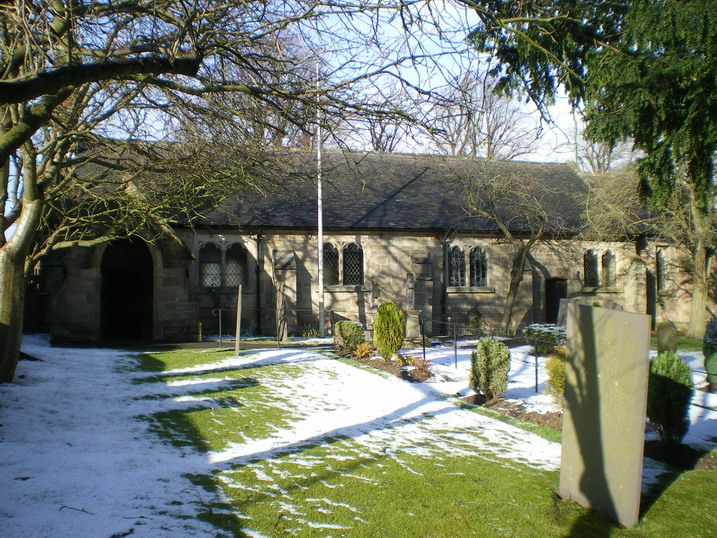
- All Saints’ Church, Turnditch
- All Saints’ Church, Turnditch
- 53°00′56.89″N 1°33′39.53″W
- OS grid reference: SK 29553 46597
- Location: Turnditch, Derbyshire
- Country: England
- Denomination: Church of England

History
- Dedication: All Saints

Architecture
- Heritage designation: Grade II listed

Administration
- Province: Canterbury
- Diocese: Derby
- Archdeaconry: Derby
- Deanery: Duffield
- Parish: Turnditch

All Saints' Church, Turnditch is a Grade II listed parish church in the Church of England in Turnditch, Derbyshire.

== History ==
A date of 1630 inscribed over the south door is often taken as the date of completion of the building. It was given a new chancel between 1882 and 1884 by Giles and Brookhouse of Derby. The new chancel was consecrated by the Bishop of Lichfield standing in for the Bishop of Southwell on 22 May 1884.

== Parish status ==
The church is in a joint parish with

- St Faith's Mission Church, Belper
- Christ Church, Belper

== Organ ==
An organ was purchased in 1891 from Bevington and Sons, London, and opened on 11 April 1891. A specification of the organ can be found on the National Pipe Organ Register.

== See also ==
- Listed buildings in Turnditch
