= Cross o' th' Hands =

Coordinates: 53.015°N 1.578°W

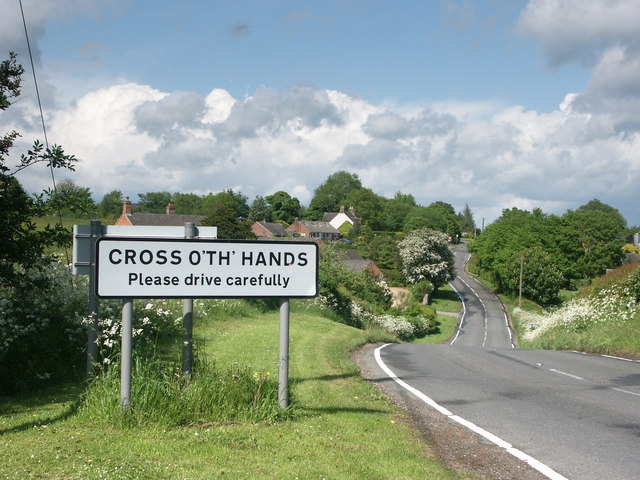
- Cross o' th' Hands.

- Location within Derbyshire
- OS grid reference: SK284464
- District: Derbyshire Dales
- Shire county: Derbyshire
- Region: East Midlands
- Country: England
- Sovereign state: United Kingdom
- Post town: BELPER
- Postcode district: DE56
- Police: Derbyshire
- Fire: Derbyshire
- Ambulance: East Midlands

Cross o' th' Hands is a small area of settlement in Derbyshire, England, 10 miles (16 km) north-west of Derby on the A517 road between Hulland and Turnditch.

The settlement is named after its original public house, near a gravel pit used for staging bare-knuckle fist fights, which was probably itself named after the sport.

Despite the settlement's small size, it is well connected via public transport, served by two Arriva buses: the 109 and the Swift service between Derby and Ashbourne.

Cross o' th' Hands' single through road, Intakes Lane, joins the A517 at the top of the hill, becoming Hillcliff Lane and joining up with the B5023 Wirksworth Road. The top of Hillcliff Lane has views across the open greenlands of Amber Valley.
