= Christ Church, Belper =

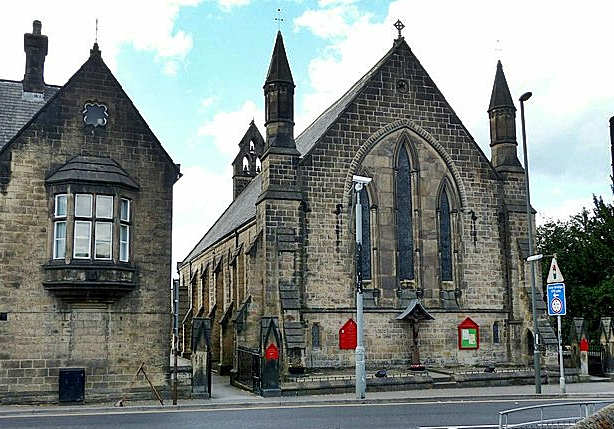
- Christ Church, Belper
- Christ Church, Belper
- 53°01′38.7″N 1°29′9.9″W
- OS grid reference: SK 34563 47912
- Location: Belper, Derbyshire
- Country: England
- Denomination: Church of England

History
- Dedication: Christ Church
- Consecrated: 30 July 1850

Architecture
- Heritage designation: Grade II listed
- Architect: Henry Isaac Stevens
- Completed: 1849

Administration
- Province: Province of Canterbury
- Diocese: Diocese of Derby
- Archdeaconry: Derbyshire Peak and Dales
- Deanery: Dove and Derwent
- Parish: Christ Church Belper

Christ Church is a Grade II listed parish church in the Church of England in Belper, Derbyshire.

== History ==
The church was built to the designs of the architect Henry Isaac Stevens and consecrated by the Bishop of Lichfield and Coventry on 30 July 1850. A vicarage was built on land to the south of the church in 1857, also to the designs of Stevens.

The church was restored in 1878 when the varnish was removed from the roof timbers and the ceiling and walls were painted by T.R. Hibbert of Belper. A screen was erected and the gas lighting extended. The floor of the church was lowered by 5 inches (13 cm) and the aisles were paved with encaustic tiles. This work was carried out under the supervision of the architect Mr. Robinson of Derby. At the same time the organ, which had formerly stood on the north side, was split either side of the chancel. The work was paid for by local industrialist G.H. Strutt whose liberality enabled the church to be converted into a free and open church. In 1903, two vestries were built and other alterations made, to the designs of Hunter and Woodhouse of Belper.

== Parish status ==
The parish of Belper Christ Church is part of a joint benefice with the parish of All Saints' Church, Turnditch.

== Organ ==
The church contains a pipe organ by Brindley & Foster A specification of the organ can be found on the National Pipe Organ Register.

=== Organists ===
- Thomas Barker Mellor 1862–1871
- James Whitehead 1877–1879
- A. W. V. Vorne Palmer 1880–???? (formerly at Lichfield Cathedral)
- Frederick William Kirkland 1883–1924
- Alec Kirkland ca. 1928–???? (son of Frederick William Kirkland)

== See also ==
- Listed buildings in Belper
