= Lumsdale Valley =

Valley in the Derbyshire Peak District

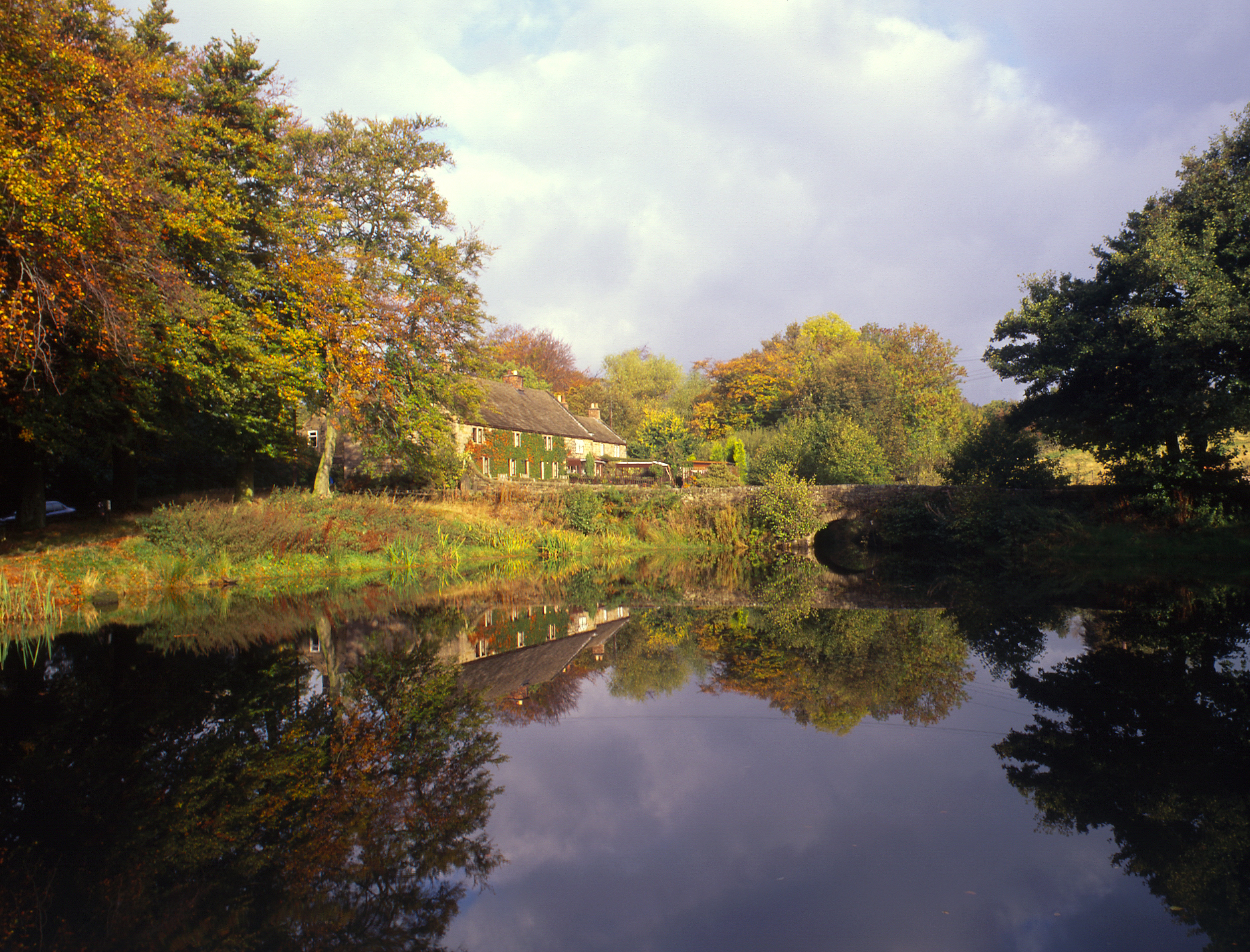
- Lower Pond on Bentley Brook and Pond Cottages

Geography
- Location: Derbyshire, England
- Coordinates: 53.1411°N 1.5337°W
- Rivers: Bentley Brook
- Interactive map of Lumsdale Valley

The Lumsdale Valley is a steep-sided wooded gorge in the Peak District near Matlock, Derbyshire, in England. It is the location of a series of historic water-powered mills.

The valley site is a protected scheduled monument, owned and preserved by the Arkwright Society (leased to the society since the 1976 and then bequeathed to it in 1996 by Marjorie Mills). It is within the Lumsdale Conservation Area, established in 1980. The monument consists of a series of historic water-powered mills and other fragile industrial archaeological structures and remains. The privately owned central gorge area of the monument is only accessible by a permissive footpath, which the Society may close when required.

The name Lumsdale is believed to mean either 'valley of chimneys' (from the Scottish word lum meaning chimney and reflecting the area's industrial heritage) or 'valley of water pools' (from the English name lumb meaning a place with a pool).

== Water features ==
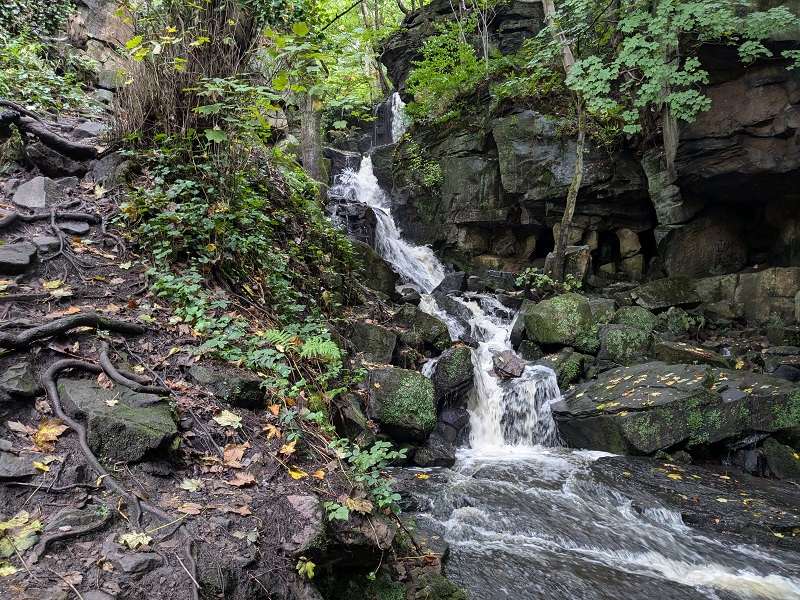
Lumsdale Falls

Bentley Brook runs through the Lumsdale Valley into the River Derwent.

The Upper Pond was constructed in the 1780s by Watts, Lowe and Co to supply water for their cotton mill. It has silted up since the dam wall broke in 1947 and is now a designated nature reserve. The Middle Pond was also from the 1780s and was restored in 2014 (funded by the Heritage Lottery) after being dry and overgrown. The Lower Pond was originally a quarry but was converted into a reservoir in 1850.

Lumsdale Falls is a scenic natural cascade below the Lower Pond.

== Industrial mills ==
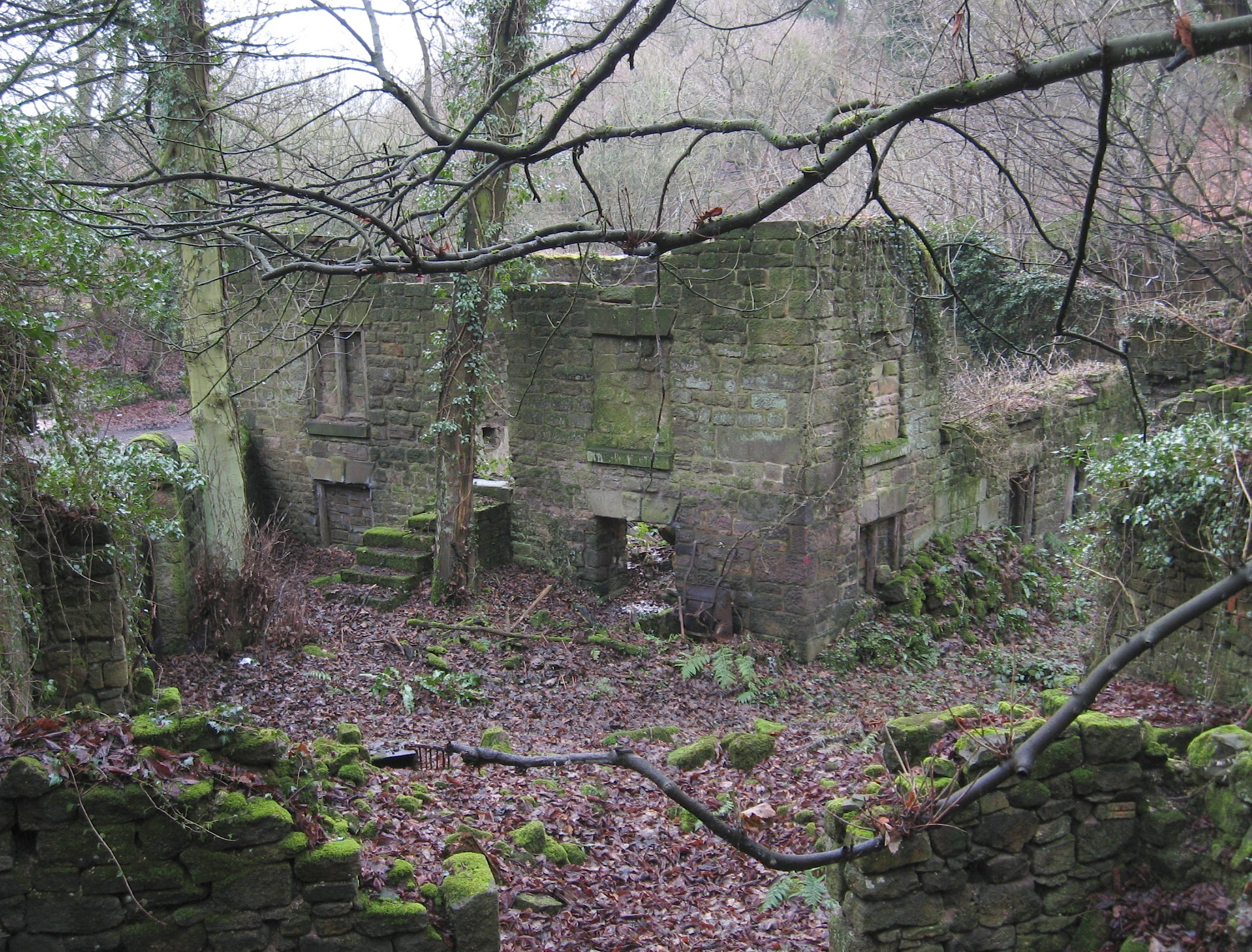
Upper Bleach Works

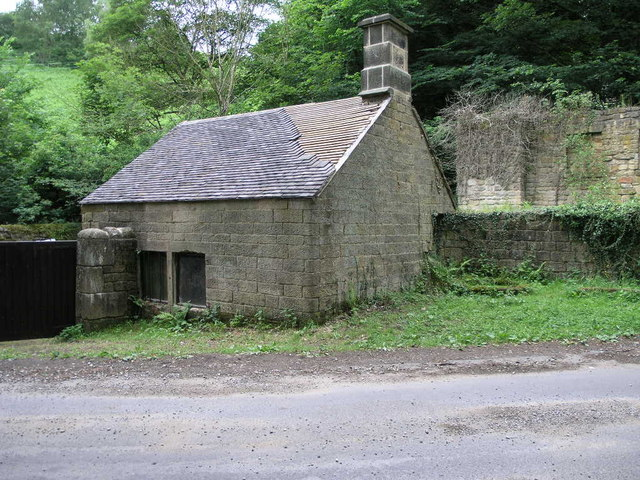
The Smithy at Lumsdale Mills

Lumsdale Mills are a closely located collection of mill buildings from the lead, textile, paint and timber industries. The mills and their associated water-management features along course of Bentley Brook date from the 17th century. The water-powered industrial landscape is a site of national archaeological and historic importance.

The Bone Mill (now overgrown ruins) was used for a variety of purposes throughout the 17th century. It was first used as a lead smelting mill and lastly for crushing bone until the 1920s.

The Paint Mill dates from the 1600s. It was used for bleaching and lead smelting, was later used a corn mill and was then used for grinding white barytes for the paint industry.

In 1749 two furnaces for smelting lead were housed in the building now known as Pond Cottages. The factory was converted into cottages for the cotton mill workers of Watts, Lowe and Co.

Richard Arkwright built the world's first powered cotton-spinning factory at nearby Cromford in 1771. Soon after Arkwright's patents expired in 1785, a three-storey water-powered cotton mill was built by Watts, Lowe and Co. However, the firm was bankrupt by 1813 and the mill was acquired by John Garton for bleaching textiles. It was then called Gartons Mill and is now known as the Lower Bleach Works, which closed in 1929. The Upper Bleach Works date from the early 1800s. The Smithy is connected to the Lower Bleach Works and is a Grade II listed building.

The Saw Mill was built in the 1850s. It was first used to grind minerals for paint but later became a saw mill.
