= Thomas Barker Mellor =

English photographer and organist

Thomas Barker Mellor (1849 – 5 September 1915) was an English photographer and organist who worked in Derbyshire from around the mid 1860s to 1913.

He was born in Belper in 1849, the son of John Mellor (1812–1900) and Jane Barker. His brother, Albert Mellor, became organist of Windsor Parish Church and was a professor at Eton College.

He received his musical education under Mr. W. W. Woodward, organist of St Mary's Church, Derby.

He started as organist at Christ Church, Belper, around 1862 and in 1871 he succeeded W. A. Shaw as organist of St Peter's Church, Belper, a position he held until 1877.

Whilst living in Belper he set himself up as a photographer in the 1860s and began advertising from his home, the Butts, Belper in 1870. Later he had photography studios in both Ripley and Belper.

On 26 January 1874 he married Mary Ann Allsop. They had six children:

- Marion M Mellor (b. 1867)
- Lillian Maude Mellor (1875–1956)
- Mabel J Mellor (b. 1879)
- Arthur Mellor (1880–1933)
- Elena F Mellor (b. 1883)
- Rosa Elizabeth Mellor (1883–1933)

In 1877 he was appointed organist at All Saints' Church, Bakewell. He had a formidable reputation locally as an organist and was in demand for recitals. He performed the opening recitals for new organs at a number of local churches including St Alkmund's Church, Duffield in 1878 and All Saints' Church, Matlock Bank in 1886.

In failing health, he resigned as organist at Bakewell in 1913 and retired to Belper. He died there on 5 September 1915.
