= Seraphine (instrument) =

Early keyed wind instrument

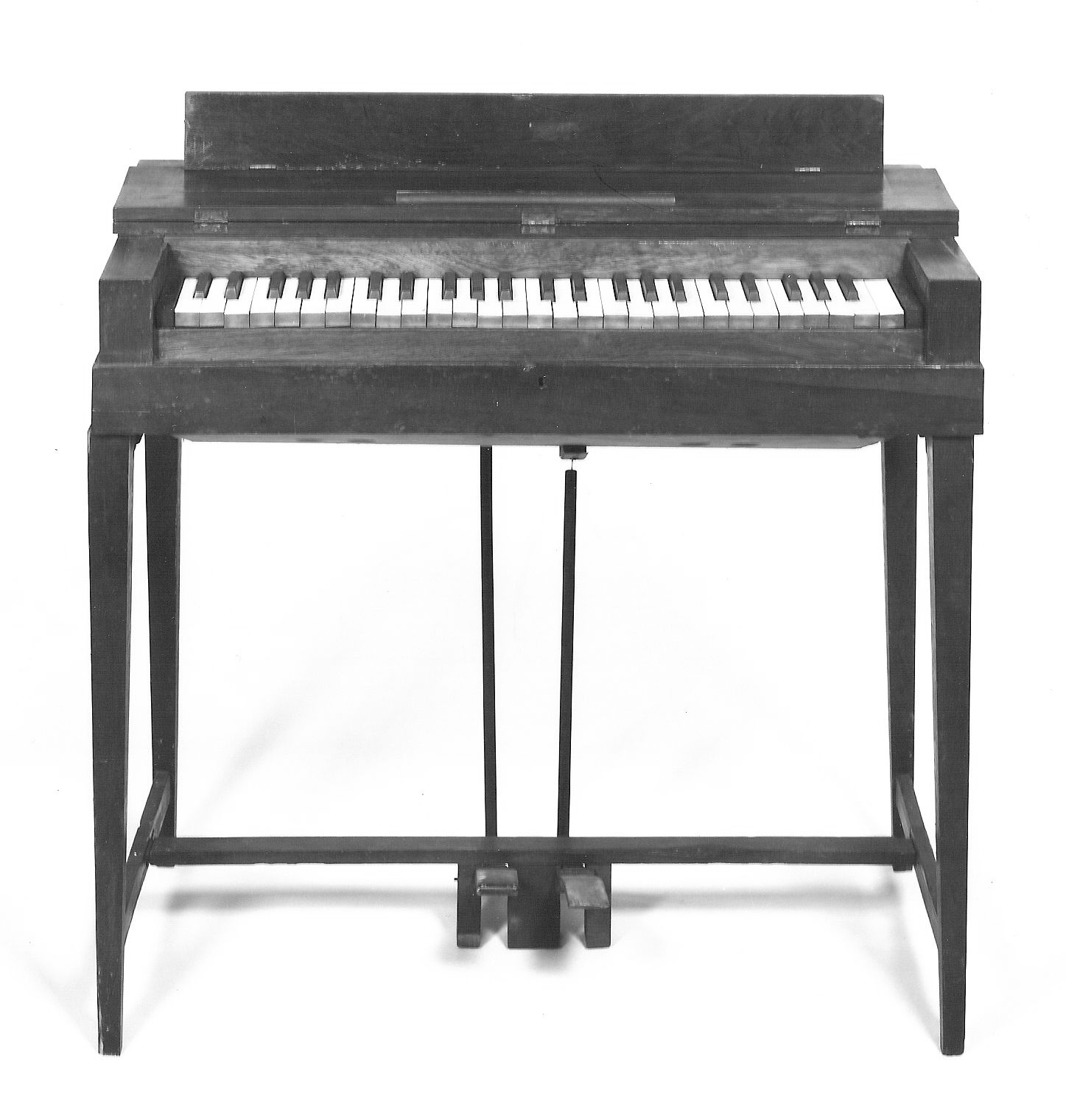
Seraphine (c. 1840) a collection of MET [89.4.1779].

The seraphine is an early keyed wind instrument, something of a cross between a reed organ and an accordion, being more similar to the former. It makes its sound via the action of air being blown across metallic reeds.

== Bibliography ==
- Green, John (1840) [1830]. The Royal Seraphine, a New Musical Instrument, Invented and Manufactured only by J. Green, 33, Soho-Square. L. Harrison (printer).
- Falle, Raymond (May 1959). "The Royal Seraphine in Jersey". The Galpin Society Journal. 12 (May). Galpin Society: 86–88. doi:10.2307/841951. JSTOR 841951.
  "It has been of considerable interest to the writer to find that the immediate precursor of the harmonium, the seraphine or Royal Seraphine, as it was sometimes desceribed, patented in 1833 by John Green of Soho Square, London, was introduced into the island of Jersey early in the following year by Mr H. Hutton, a musical instrument dealer of Charles Street, St Helier. This fact is revealed in an advertisement appearing in the Chronique de Jersey of April 26, 1834, which state: ... / Further reference to the seraphine in Jersey occurs in The Jersey Argus of May 5, 1835, when Mr T. O. Lyte, cabinet maker and musical instrument dealer of 37 Hill Street, St Helier, advertised thus: ..."
- Richard, James Howard (2004). "Seraphine". In Douglas Bush, Richard Kassel (ed.). The Organ - An Encyclopedia. Taylor & Francis. pp. 504–505. ISBN 978-1-135-94796-5.
  "SERAPHINE A reed organ (Also called the Royal Seraphine) invented by the Englishman John Green, a former traveling representative for the Clementi pianomaking firm. Green, who had a shop in Soho Square ... / The Seraphine is mentioned in patents taken out in 1839, 1846, 1850 (...), and 1852 (...). By this last date, the instrument had been superseded by the true harmonium. Later in England the term Seraphine was applied to any free-reed organ operating on the suction principle."
- Allan, Robert J. (2013). "The Seraphine". Reed Organs in England (latex2html). WebSite: Rob Alan's Histories of Technology (tardis.dl.ac.uk). Archived from the original on 2012-05-12.
