= Old Town Hall, Mansfield =

Municipal building in Nottinghamshire, England

Coordinates: 53.1438°N 1.1968°W

The Old Town Hall
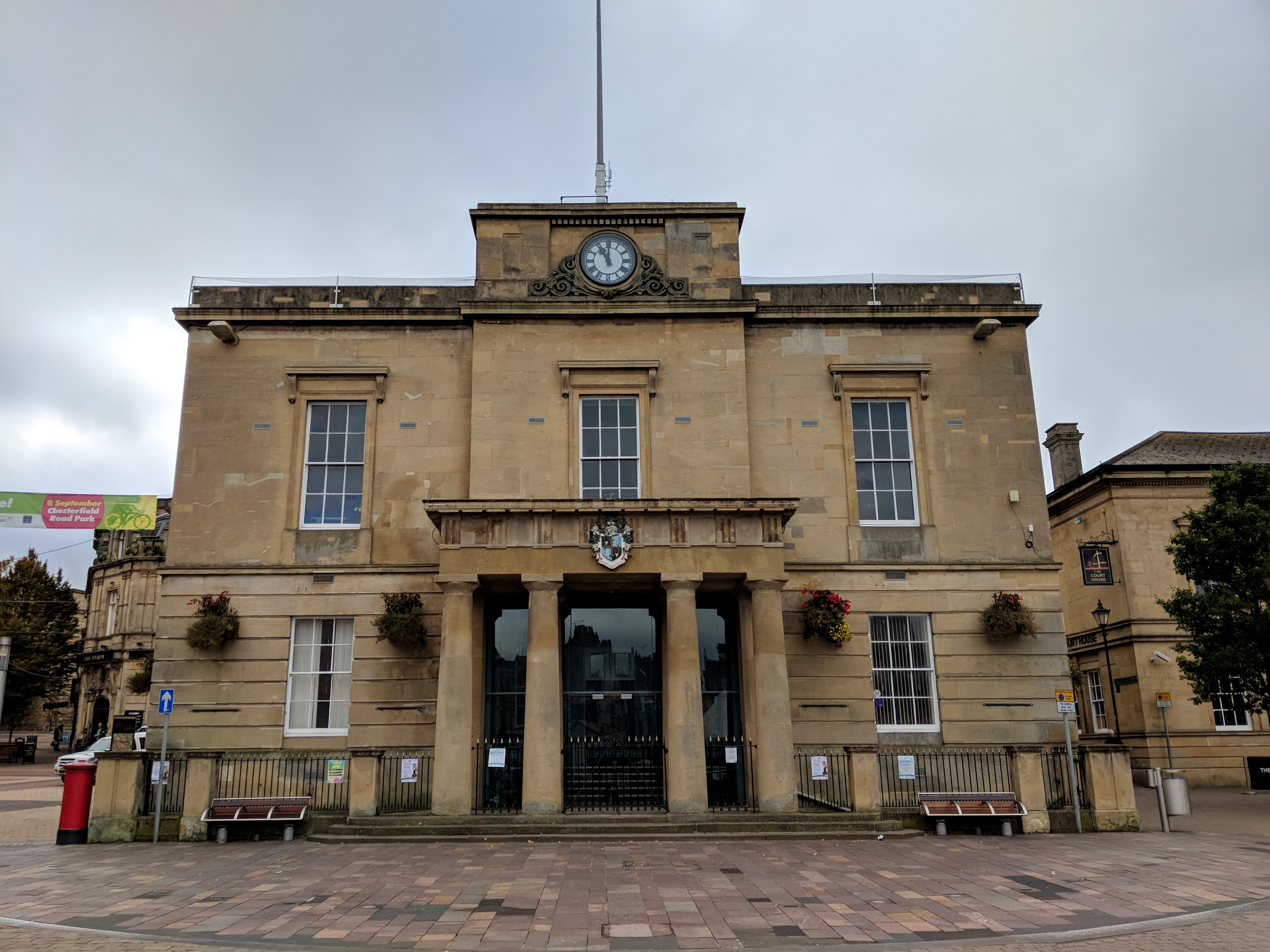
- Front View

- Location within Nottinghamshire

General information
- Architectural style: Neoclassical
- Location: Market Place, Mansfield, Nottinghamshire, England
- Year built: 1836

Design and construction
- Architect: William Adams Nicholson

Listed Building – Grade II*
- Official name: The Old Town Hall and attached piers and railings
- Designated: 17 March 1978
- Reference no.: 1207179

The Old Town Hall is a municipal building in the Market Place in Mansfield, Nottinghamshire, England. The town hall, which was the meeting venue of Mansfield District Council, is a Grade II* listed building.

== History ==
In the early 19th century, civic meetings were held in the Moot Hall. After civic leaders found the moot hall was inadequate for their needs (the largest room measured only 48 feet (15 m) long by 17 feet (5.2 m) wide), a group of local businessmen decided to form "The Town Hall Company" to develop a new building.

The foundation stone for the new building was laid by John Coke of Debdale Hall on 21 July 1835. It was designed by William Adams Nicholson in the neoclassical style, built in ashlar stone and completed in 1836. The design involved a symmetrical main frontage with three bays facing onto the Market Place; the central bay, which slightly projected forward, featured a tetrastyle portico with Doric order columns supporting an entablature bearing the town's coat of arms.

The open space behind the columns was intended to be a corn exchange, with ground floor rooms for magistrates, reading, and a library. Behind were houses for the caretaker and a constable with a lock-up having ten cells. There were sash windows on the first floor and a clock in the pediment above. Internally, the principal room on the first floor was the council chamber, described as "a noble hall of assembly for North Nottinghamshire", with a side-chamber for Commissioners.

After completion in 1836, a grand ball was held on 23 December. A clock was provided as the nearest public clock, on St Peter's Church, was not visible from the centre of town. It was lit by gas from 4 February 1837. In 1840 the market place was enlarged, taking on its present shape.

The Town Improvement Commissioners purchased the buildings, including a space to the front, from the Town Hall Company in April 1883 and a public reading room was opened in the building on 28 October 1891.

The area, which became a municipal borough in 1891, saw continued population growth with the development of the coal mining industry in the early 20th century, with the town hall serving as the headquarters of the new borough council. George V and Queen Mary made an official visit to Mansfield on 25 June 1914, and did so again on 11 July 1928, and on both occasions attended receptions in front of the town hall. The building was requisitioned by the War Office at the start of the Second World War and council meetings were held in the electricity showrooms in Regent Street until the building was handed back in August 1944. The town hall became the local seat of government for the enlarged Mansfield District Council when it was formed in 1974.

Elizabeth II, accompanied by the Duke of Edinburgh, went on a walkabout along Westgate before signing the visitors book at the town hall on 28 July 1977. The building was designated Grade II* in 1978, which signifies "particularly important buildings of more than special interest". The town hall ceased to be the local seat of government when the new council relocated to Mansfield Civic Centre, which was opened by Princess Anne in 1986. However, a tourist information office was established in the town hall in August 1994.

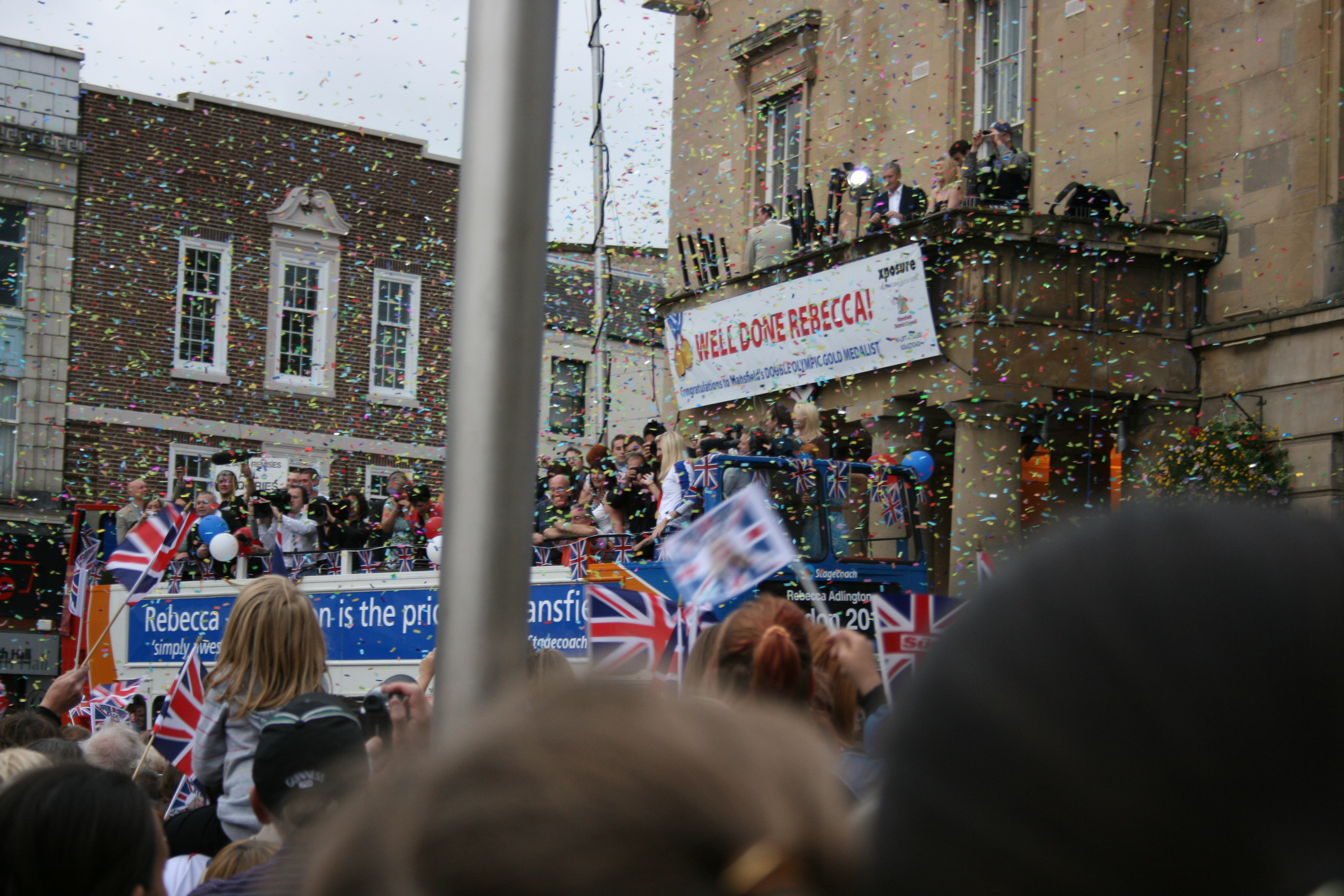
Rebecca Adlington on an open-top bus after parading around Mansfield town centre streets in 2008

The local competitive swimmer, Rebecca Adlington, who won gold medals for each of the 400 and 800-metre freestyle swimming events at the 2008 Summer Olympics in Beijing, was welcomed home to Mansfield by thousands of people who lined the streets to applaud as she passed by in an open top bus and then appeared at a ceremony at the town hall in August 2008.

== Refurbishment ==
Mansfield District Council identified that the building needed urgent repairs. The adjacent old indoor market was demolished in 2010 to provide car parking.

After heavy rain on 4 April 2012 dislodged roof tiles, the ceiling of the council chamber part-collapsed during a 60-year anniversary celebration for Chad, the local Mansfield newspaper. A temporary repair was effected.

To allow wider remedial works to start on the structure, Mansfield BID (Business Improvement District), based at Old Town Hall since inception in 2010, moved out in 2015, together with some remaining council administrators. Further upgrading and long-term underuse prompted applications for further works and renovation grants from 2018, including facilitating creation of rentable office accommodation, internal retail areas and renovation of two external retail units.

In October 2021, the council announced a plan to create a new community hub in Old Town Hall, intending to relocate their own staff together with other local parties, having vested interests in the Civic Centre and the area. The project was subject to a successful bid for funding from central government under the Levelling up scheme announced in 2021.

In March 2022, Mansfield District Council announced that all of the retail units had been let – two external and three internal – to a variety of small businesses. The council's Town Centre Management Team are also based within the building.

In 2023, the council's priorities changed, no longer intending to relocate staff into the building, having acquired a £20 million grant from central government towards the cost of converting the nearby old Art Deco-styled former Co-Operative store, closed since 2020, into a multi-agency hub with space sub-let to partner organisations such as police, social services, Jobcentre Plus and the local college; the college subsequently planned to occupy the former Debenhams store, closed since 2021, in a modern shopping precinct.

The footprint of the former indoor market to the rear of the town hall, which became a temporary car park, was converted into a hard-landscaped, terraced, memorial garden, with associated nearby sustainable drainage planting in the town hall approaches.

== See also ==
- Grade II* listed buildings in Nottinghamshire
- Listed buildings in Mansfield (inner area)
