= Town Mill, Mansfield =

Historic building in Mansfield, England

Coordinates: 53°08′37″N 1°11′32″W

Town Mill is a historic building in Mansfield, England. It was built around 1775 as a water-driven flour mill and later converted to manufacture textiles. From 1969 to 2010, Town Mill operated as a public house and music venue. After falling derelict, several attempts have been made to bring it back into use. Mansfield District Council's 2021 treatise 'Mansfield Town Centre Masterplan' included a vision to regenerate and refurbish the building to bring it back into use.

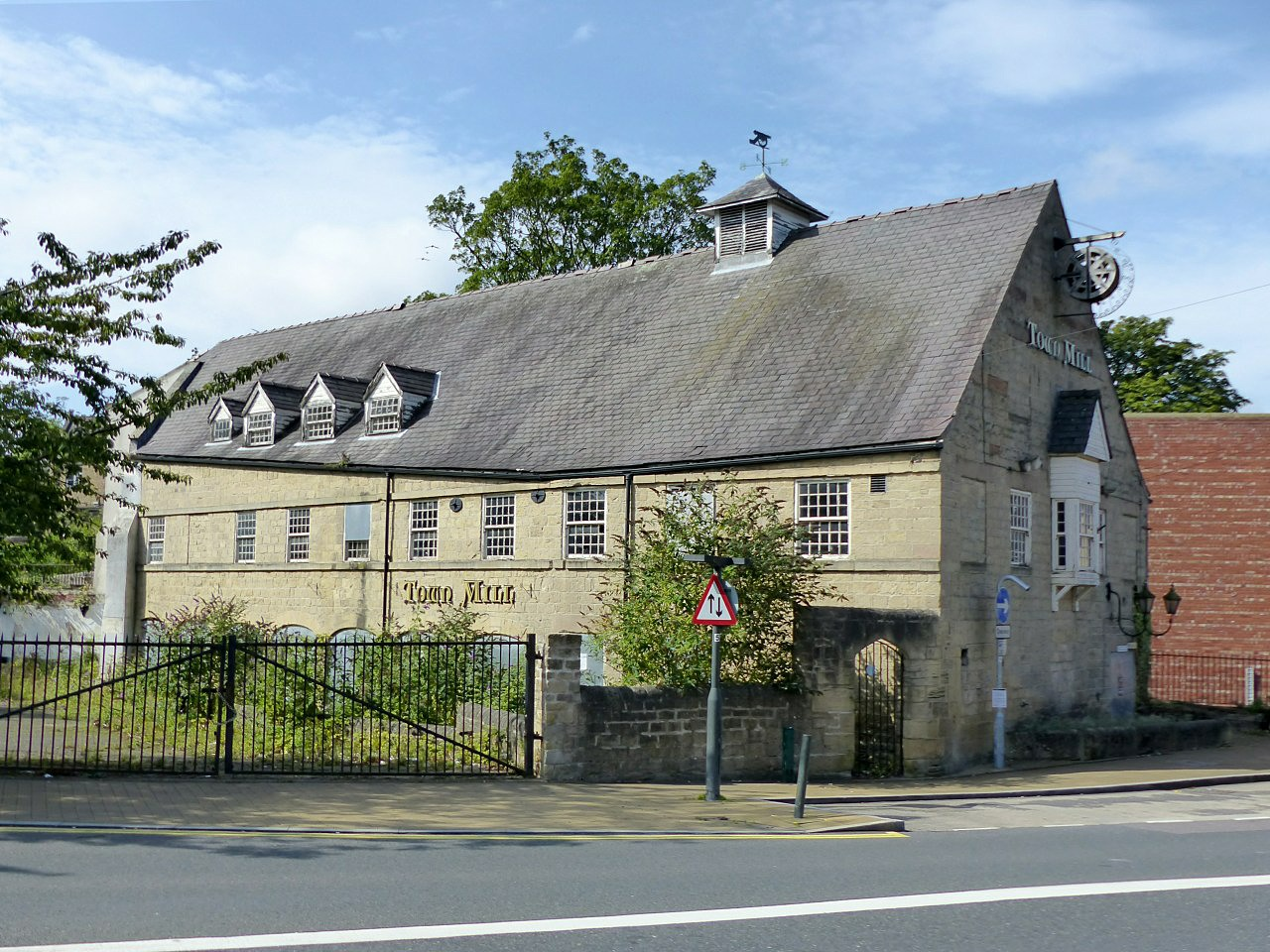
View from the north-east in 2019

== History ==
The current mill building was erected around 1775 but milling took place on the site from at least the 1740s. It operated initially as a water-driven flour mill before being converted to the manufacture of textiles. In 1816, it was under the ownership of Hankock, Wakefield & Harker. At the site and the nearby New Mill, they employed 48 men, 110 women, 47 boys and 69 girls (some of the latter under the age of 10). In 1907, the building suffered two fires which left significant damage to the top storey and the matchboard roof. From 1969, the building operated as a public house and music venue. On 21 March 1994, the mill building and an adjoining boundary wall were granted statutory protection as a grade II listed building. The pub closed in 2010 and the site fell derelict.

In 2016, a public consultation was held on a £1.7 million plan to bring the building back into use by Charnwood Training Group as a training academy for the pub food industry. The upper floors would have hosted a 16-room bed and breakfast run by students as a not-for-profit enterprise. The plan ended when the company collapsed. In 2019, a planning application was submitted to convert the structure into an 18-room hotel, restaurant and micro-brewery. This also did not progress and in September 2021, Mansfield District Council declared its ambition to bring the building back into use as part of a redevelopment of the town centre.

In January 2024, the Town Mill was listed in the Mansfield Chad newspaper as the building that local people most wanted to see brought back into use; suggestions were made of returning it to use as a pub or converting it into a small hydro-electric power station. In September 2024, the building was raided by Nottinghamshire Police, who found a 2,000-plant illegal cannabis farm stretching across multiple rooms of the structure. The plants, with a street value in excess of £2 million, were taken away and the growing equipment destroyed. A suspect was arrested nearby.

== Description ==
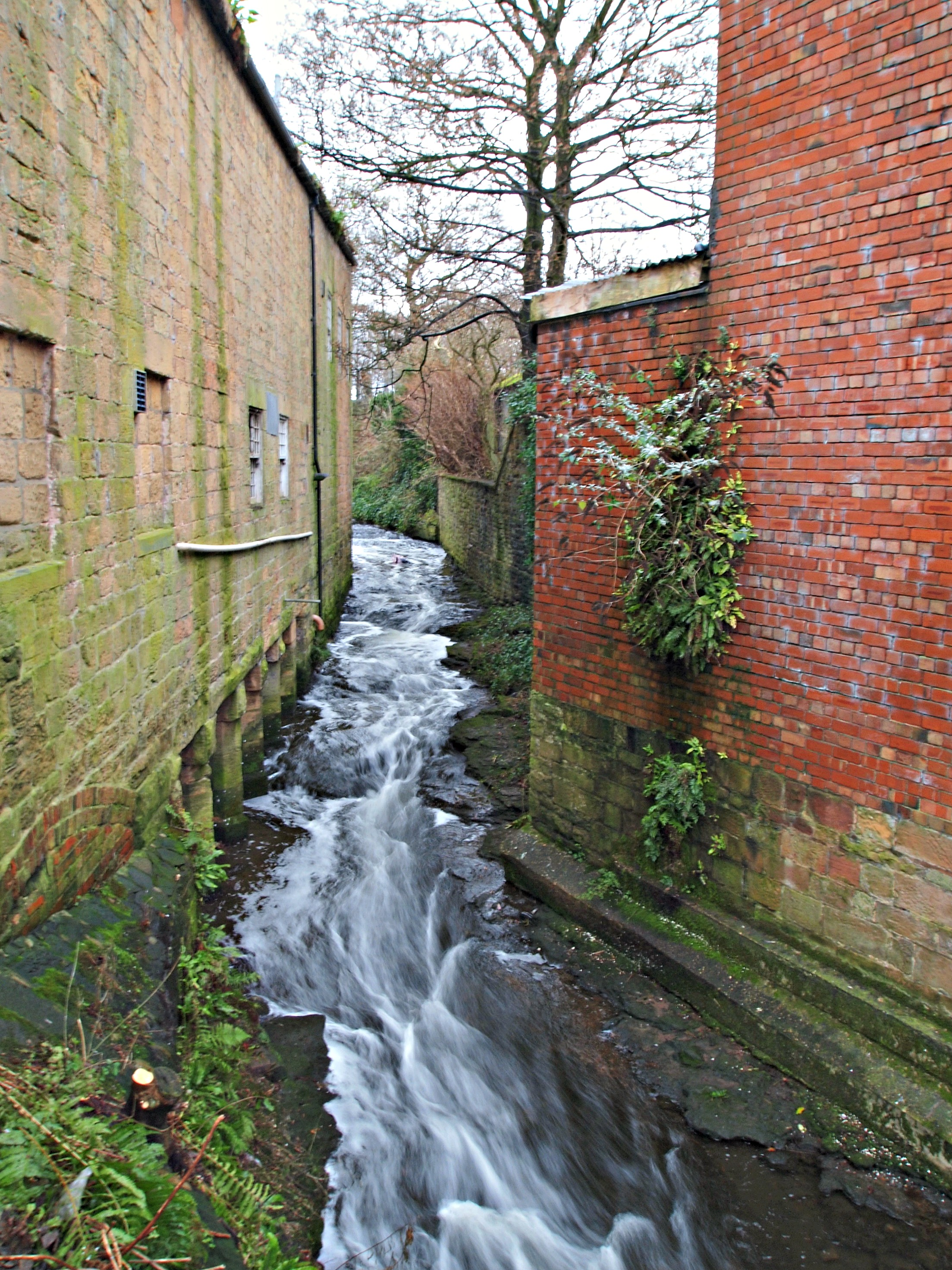
River Maun along the west elevation; tailrace openings are visible at the bottom of the wall on the left.

Town Mill is a 2-storey building made of stone blocks with a tiled roof. The roof is surmounted by a wooden ventilator structure and pierced by four dormer windows on the east elevation, providing light to the attic. The east elevation has ten casement windows at first floor level, though the second from the south has been blocked up. There are bands of stone detailing running along this elevation above and below the windows. The ground floor of the east elevation has a 7-arch arcade divided with square piers and impost details and, north of these, three casement windows. The southern-most arch has a louvred infill, the next arch has a plain infill and the remainder are glazed; the central arch contains an entrance door.

The north elevation is a gable end and has some casement windows and a number of blank windows. A 20th-century entrance door exists on the right-hand side; the left-hand entrance has been blocked up. Attached to the east side of the north elevation is a boundary wall with a half-round coping and a pedestrian gateway arch. The east elevation is adjacent to the River Maun; five openings are present for the mill tailrace and an archway at river level has been blocked up. There are two blank windows and five casement windows on this elevation.

== See also ==
- Listed buildings in Mansfield (inner area)
