= Moot Hall, Mansfield =

Municipal building in Mansfield, England

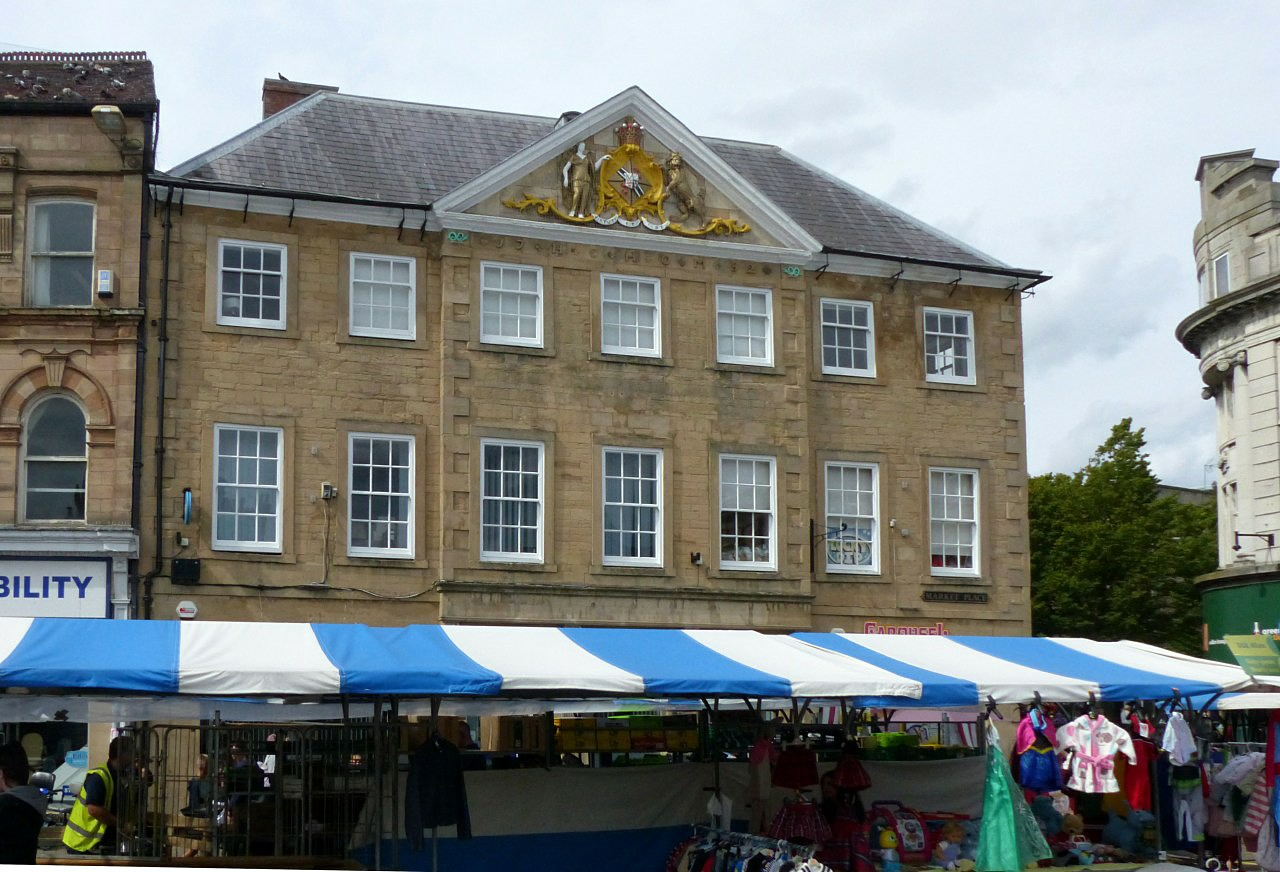

- Shown in Nottinghamshire
- 53.1446°N 1.1966°W
- Location: Market Place, Mansfield

History
- Built: 1752

Site notes
- Architectural style: Neoclassical style

Listed Building – Grade II
- Official name: Former Moot Hall at north corner of Market Place
- Designated: 19 December 1955
- Reference no.: 1207177

The Moot Hall is a former municipal building situated on one corner of the Market Place in Mansfield, Nottinghamshire, England. The moot hall now operates as shops at ground floor level. The Grade II listed building now operates as shops at ground floor level.

== History ==
The first moot hall in Mansfield was a medieval structure which was rebuilt in the 16th century. It was demolished, after it again became dilapidated. The current building was commissioned by the Henrietta Harley, Countess of Oxford and Countess Mortimer, whose seat was at Welbeck Abbey, in the mid-18th century.

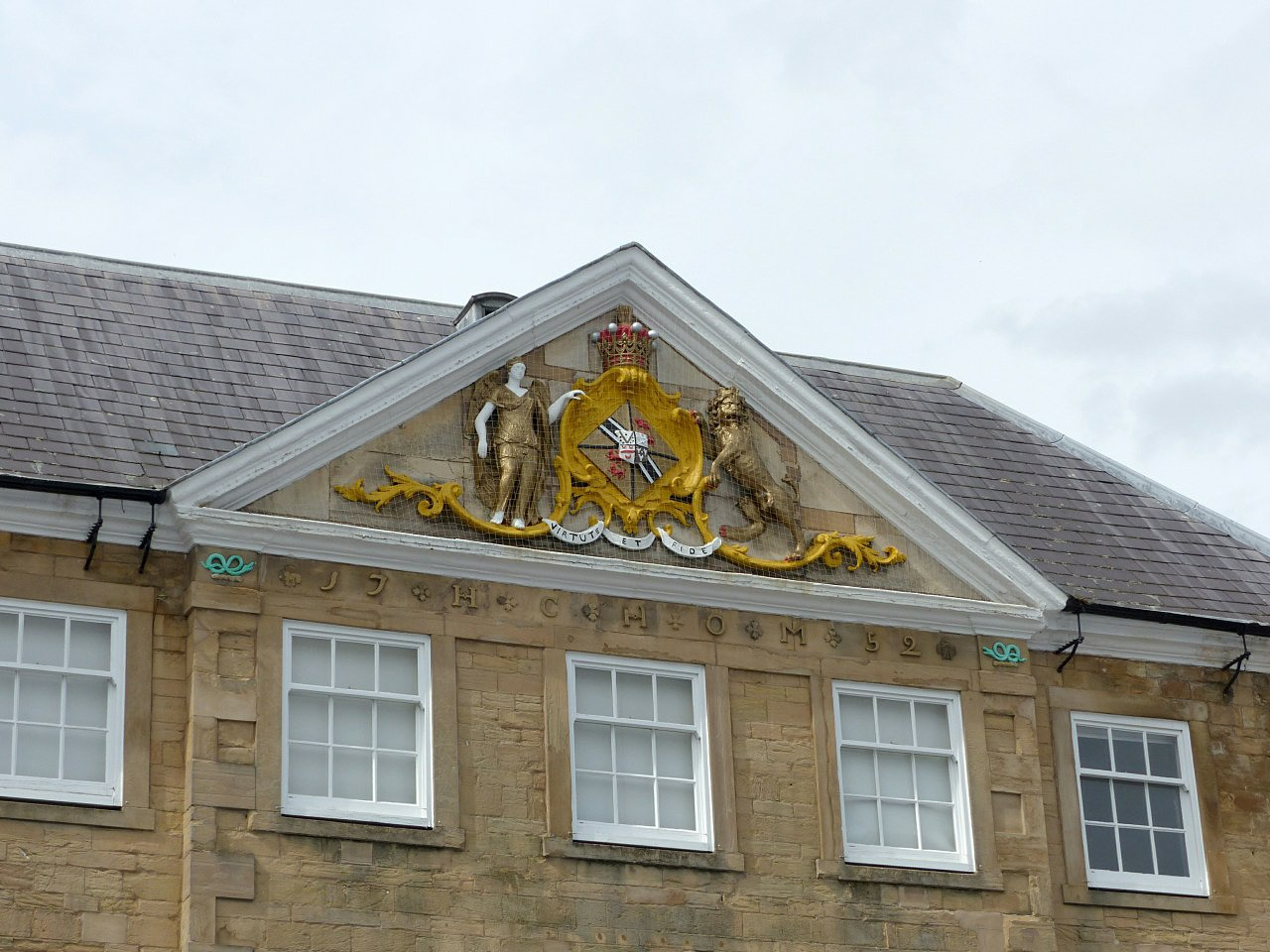
Ornate pediment above the building

The building was designed in the neoclassical style, built in ashlar stone and was completed in 1752. The design involved a symmetrical main frontage of seven bays facing onto the Market Place. Originally it was open on the ground floor, so markets could be held, with large columns to support the structure on the upper floors. It was fenestrated by tall sash windows on the first floor and square sash windows on the second floor. The central section of three bays, which was slightly projected forward, was surmounted by a entablature carved with the letters "HCHOM" (Henrietta Cavendish Holles [of] Oxford & Mortimer) and the year (1752), and by a pediment with a gilded coat of arms of the Oxford family in the tympanum. The architectural historian, Nikolaus Pevsner, commented favourably on the "graceful pediment decorated in the Rococo taste". Internally, the principal room was the main assembly room which measured 48 feet (15 m) long by 17 feet (5.2 m) wide.

In February 1782, the moot hall was the venue for a lively debate, presided over by Lord George Manners-Sutton, on the proposals advocated by William Pitt for parliamentary reform including, specifically, the abolition of rotten and pocket boroughs. A further debate took place in the moot hall in February 1790 on the proposed repeal of the Test Acts, and another debate took place in June 1794 on the increasing threat from France and the need to defend the county of Nottinghamshire. A sum of £8,549 was pledged at the debate and the Nottinghamshire (South Nottinghamshire) Yeomanry Cavalry was formed in response.

After civic leaders found the moot hall was inadequate for their needs, a group of local businessmen decided to form "The Town Hall Company" to develop a new Town Hall on the southwest side of the Market Place in 1835. The moot hall was then converted for retail use and, in 1921, it was occupied by the local branch of Yorkshire Bank. By the early 21st century it was home of the local branch of Nationwide Building Society, and, after the building society also closed its branch, the ground floor was occupied by a local sweet shop known as "Carousel Candy", and offices.

== See also ==
- Listed buildings in Mansfield (inner area)
