= St John's Church, Mansfield =

Church in England

Coordinates: 53°08′48″N 01°12′06″W

St. John's Church, Mansfield
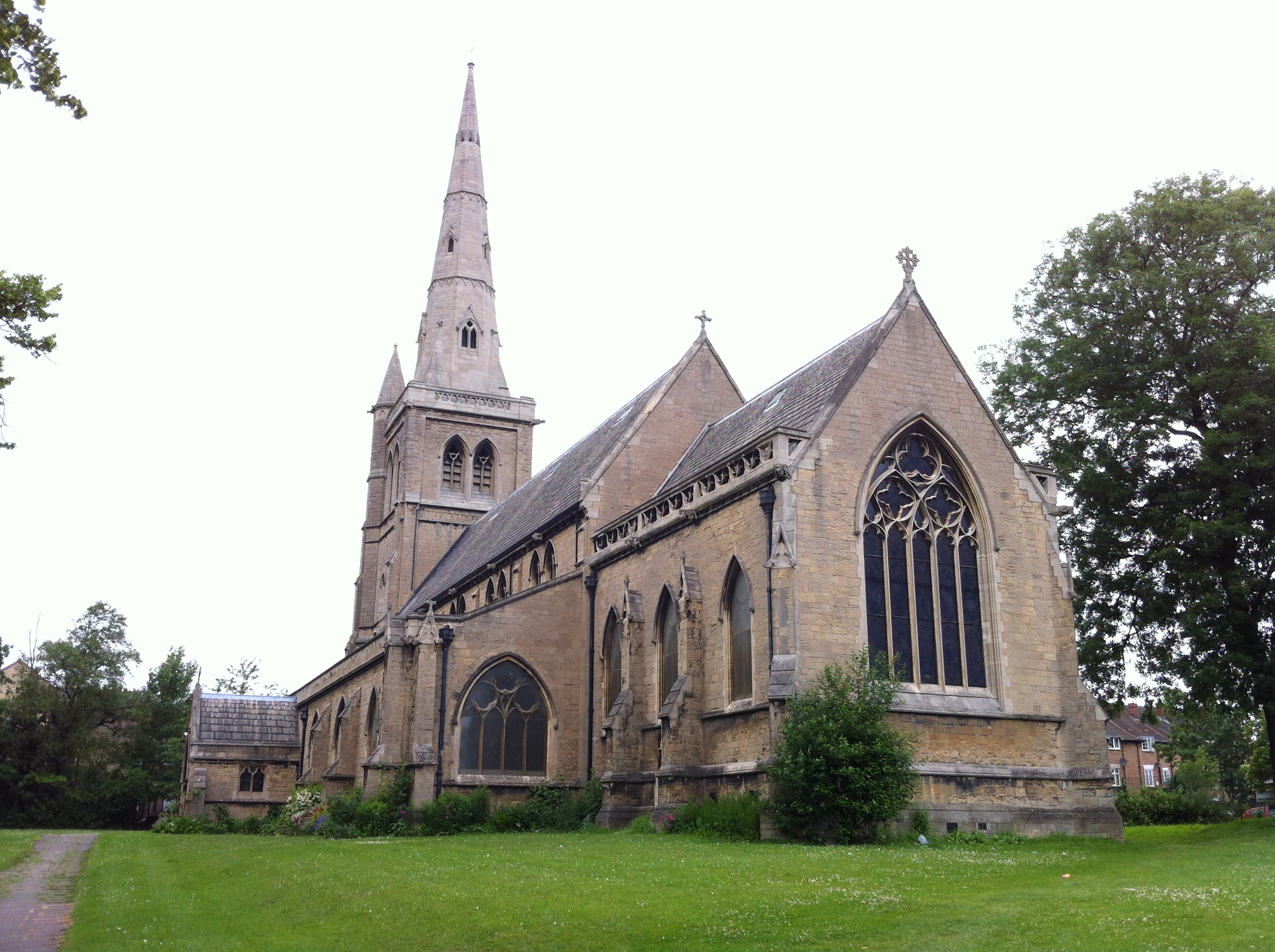
- St. John's Church, Mansfield
- Denomination: Church of England
- Churchmanship: Evangelical
- Website: St John's with St Mary's Mansfield

History
- Dedication: St. John

Administration
- Province: York
- Diocese: Southwell and Nottingham
- Parish: Mansfield, St John with St Mary

Clergy
- Vicar: Rev Chris Lee

St. John's Church, Mansfield is a parish church in the Church of England located in Mansfield, Nottinghamshire.

The church is Grade II listed by the Department for Digital, Culture, Media and Sport as it is a building of special architectural or historic interest.

The wall and gate piers to the churchyard are also Grade II listed.

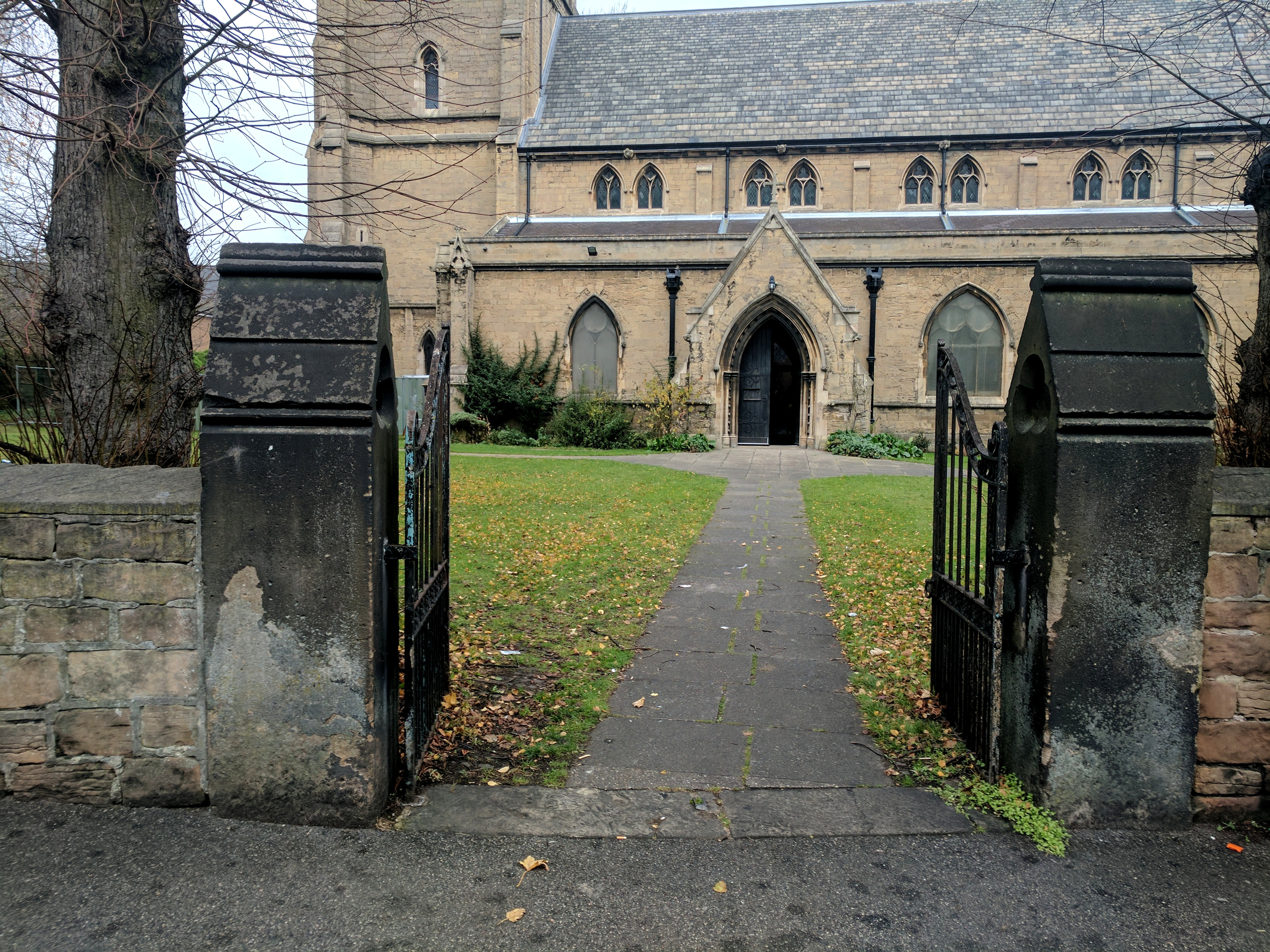
Wall and gate piers to churchyard of St John the Evangelist, St John's St, Mansfield

== History ==
St. John's Church was built in 1855-56 for £8,000. It was designed by the architect Henry Isaac Stevens.

It was consecrated by the Bishop of Lincoln Rt. Revd John Jackson on 29 July 1856. Gally Knight had left a bequest of £6,000 for its construction, and the parishioners raised an additional £1,000. The Duke of Portland offered £1,000 for the erection of a parsonage-house. The church was described in the Derby Mercury of 6 August 1856 as

of the style called early decorated, and consists of a nave, two aisles, chancel, tower and spire, and a small porch on the south side. It is flanked with substantial buttresses, and built externally of the stone for which the neighbourhood is so famous, the interior being case throughout with Ancaster stone, which is exceedingly white and closely grained. The roofs are high pitched, the walls of the nave being surmounted by a cornice ornamented with carved gothic patterns, that on each side of the chancel consisting of an open parapet similar to that which runs along the summit of the tower. The windows of the clerestory are of two lights, the great east window of five, whilst the others are of different widths, some of two and the rest of three lights, each being filled with geometrical tracery, of a character strictly harmonising with the style of the building The tower is square, the upper story of belfry being lighted by eight windows, two on each face. There is an octagon staircase at the south-west corner, capped by a neat turret. The spire is octagon, and is surrounded by two bands enriched with diaper work, and a number of spire lights, the whole being surmounted by a cross and vane. The aspect of the interior is likewise very pleasing, and would be more so if some of the windows were filled with stained glass. The timbers of the roof both in the nave and chancel are visible, the interstices being of coloured cement. The arcade which supports the nave is plain and substantial, the arches springing from strong octagon pillars, the capitals of which are but slightly ornamented. The church is fitted throughout with open stained deal benches, and is calculated to seat about 1,000 people, 630 of the sittings being free and unappropriated. The baptismal font, which is of Mansfield stone, is a present from Charles Lindley, Esq. The pulpit and reading desk, situated on the north-west and south-west angles of the chancel are of wood, supported on wrought iron work. The columns for the reredos are of Derbyshire marble, and are of very chaste appearance. The dimensions of the building are as follow: the nave 92 feet 6 inches in length within the walls, ad the width including the aisles 59 feet 6 inches; the chancel 35 feet by 22 feet. The tower which is about 16 feet square, is about 80 feet in height, the spire about 100 feet, giving a total altitude from the ground of 180 feet. The architect selected by the bishop to execute the work is Mr. Henry Isaac Stevens, of Derby, on whom the building reflects the highest possible credit.

The church suffered some embarrassment in September 1866 when the incumbent, Rev. J.T. Brameld, eloped with a young lady called Paulson, and was thought to have emigrated to Australia.

On 8 February 1871, a serious gas explosion occurred during a service. Jeremiah Pool, the clerk, was examining the floor at the west end of the church with a wax taper, when the explosion took place. Several people were injured. The pews in the centre aisle of the west end were blown to fragments, and a portion of one of the stone pillars was sent through the roof. Several stained glass windows were damaged.

== Incumbents ==
- Rev. J.T. Brameld ?-1866
- ...
- Revd William Lilley 1909-1917
- ...
- Revd Keith B. Frampton 1931-1951
- Revd Jim Neil early 1971-1977
- Revd Richard Rice-Oxley 1978-1982
- Revd Ken Shill 1983-1993
- Revd Alan Howe 1994-1996
- Revd Graham Knott 1997-2006
- Revd Canon Mark Adams 2007-2016
- Revd Christopher Lee 2020 -

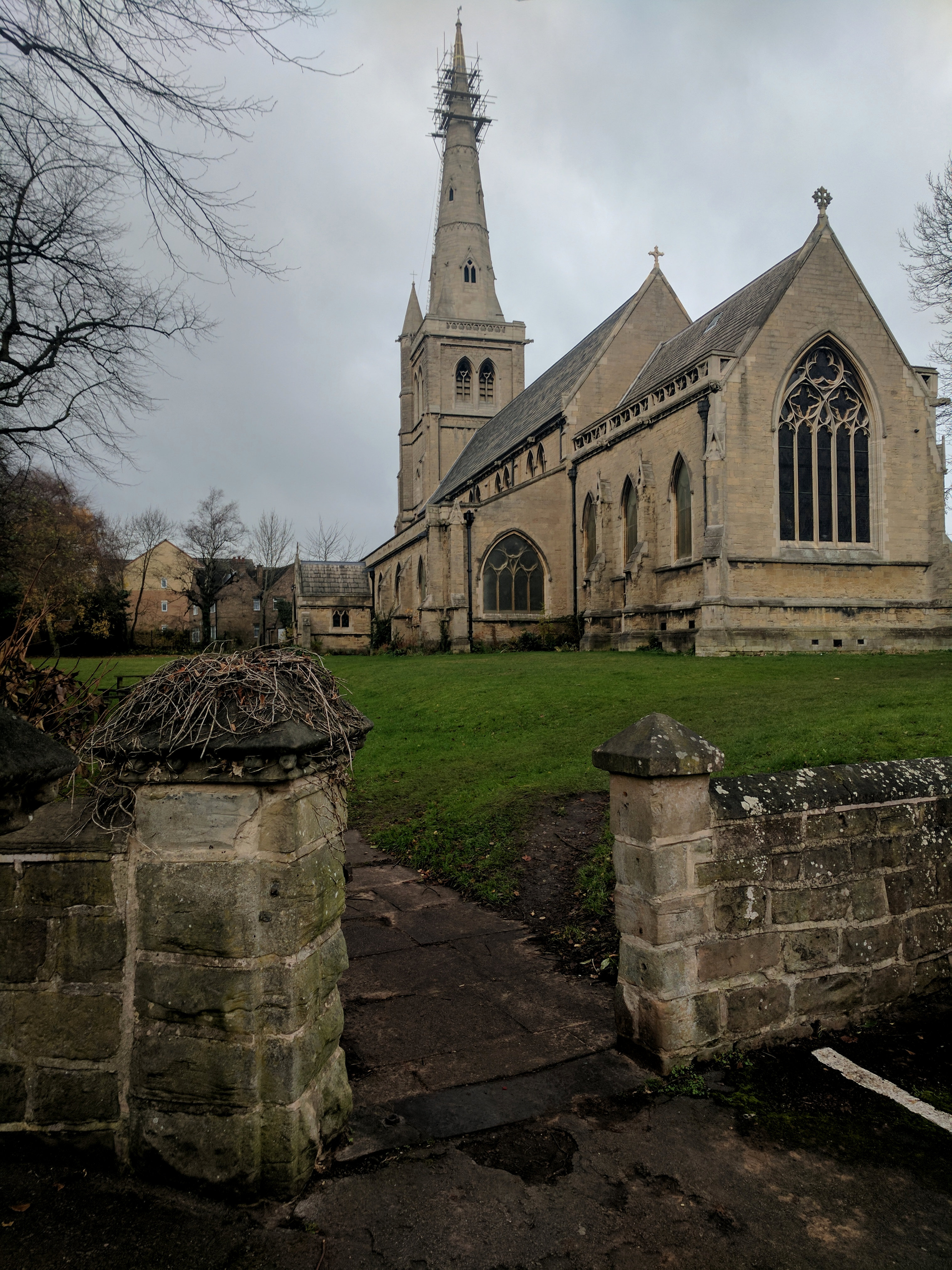
St. John's Church viewed from the side gate

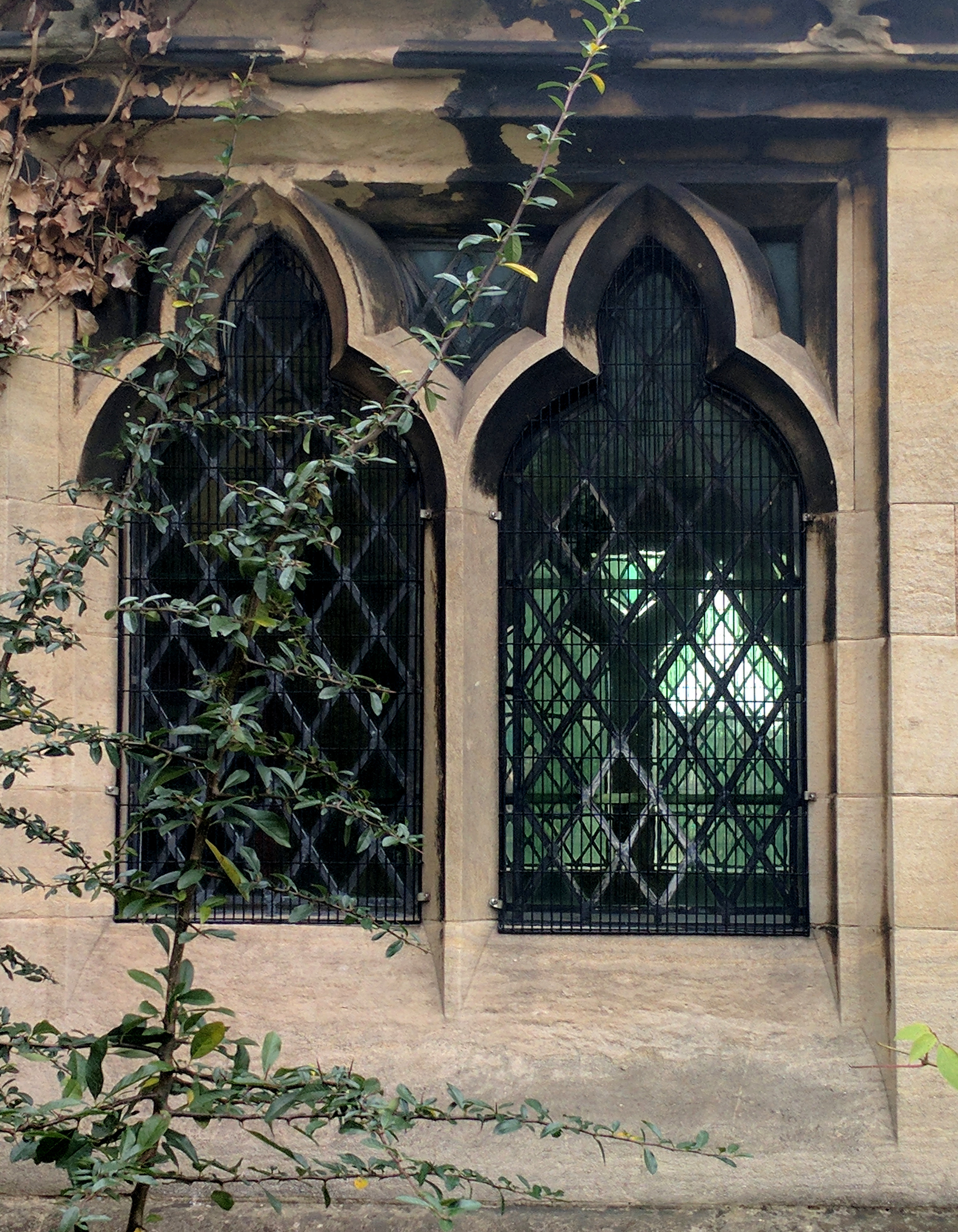
Window of the entrance vestibule of St. John's Church

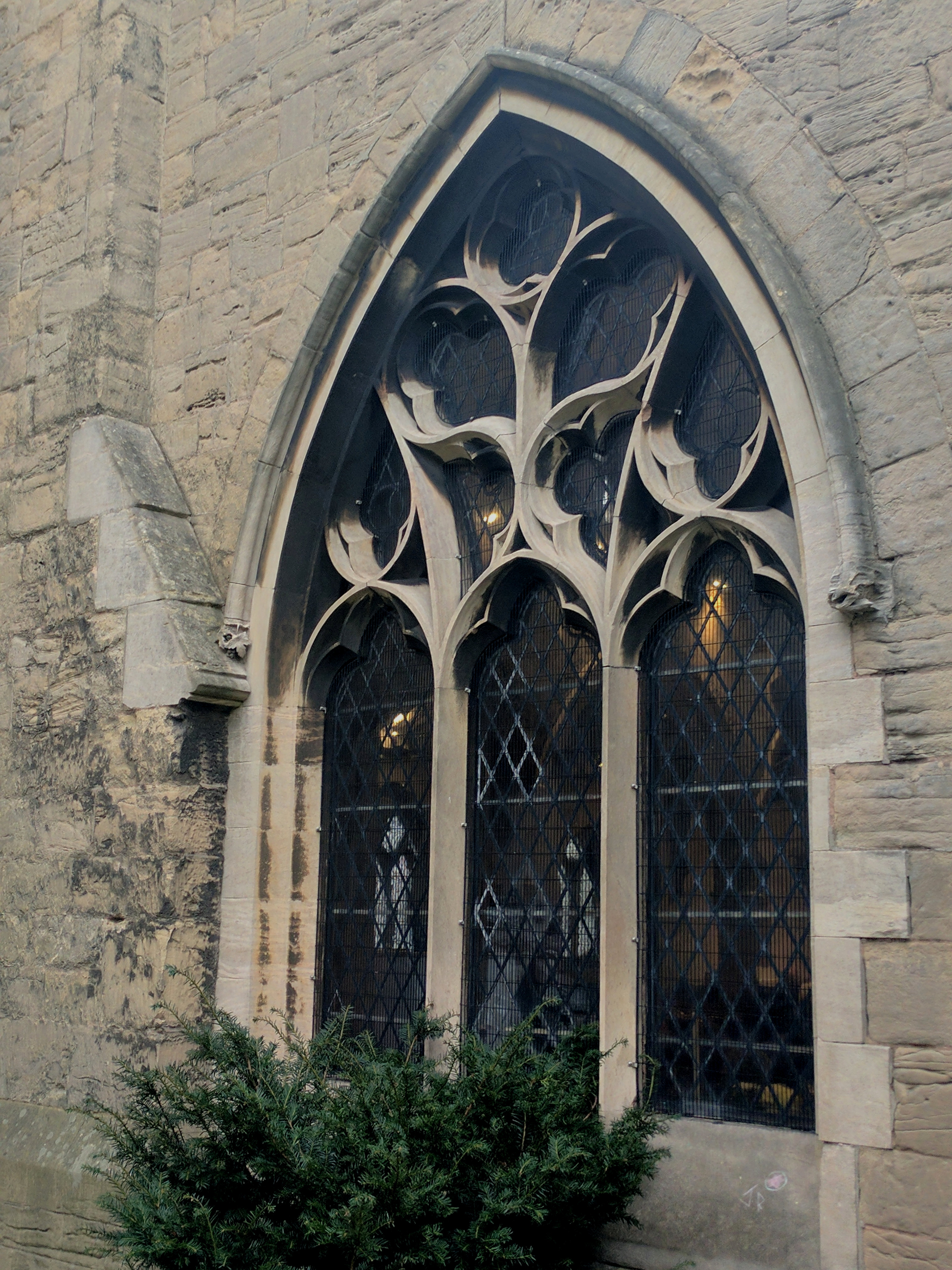
St. John's Church viewed from the side gate

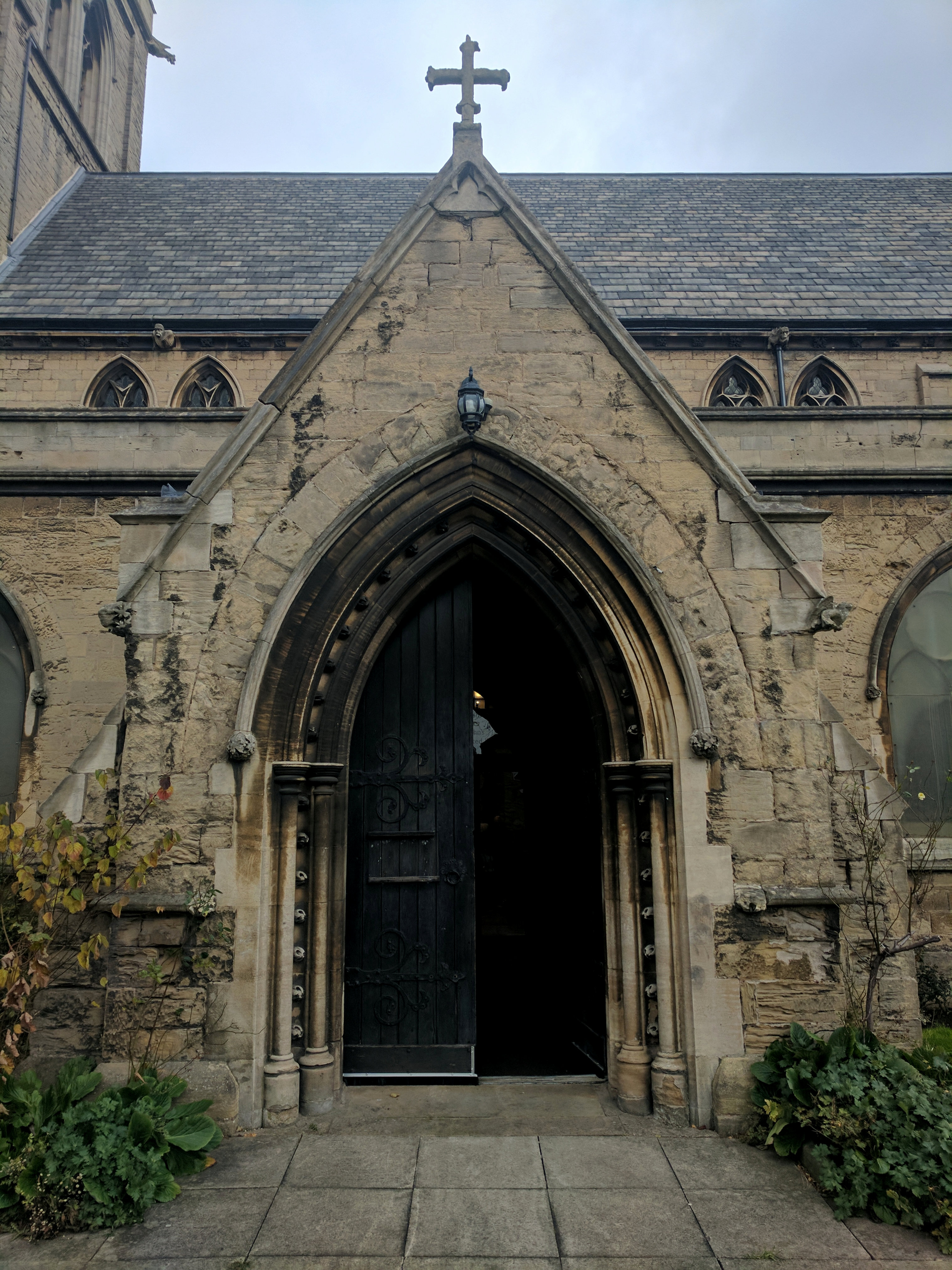
Main entrance to St. John's Church

== The Beacon ==
The church also hosts The Beacon, a charitable organisation established in 2001, based at the church hall providing a support centre for homeless and socially disadvantaged people. Mansfield's Executive Mayor Andy Abrahams started volunteering at the centre in 2017.

== St Mary Church (Ladybrook) ==
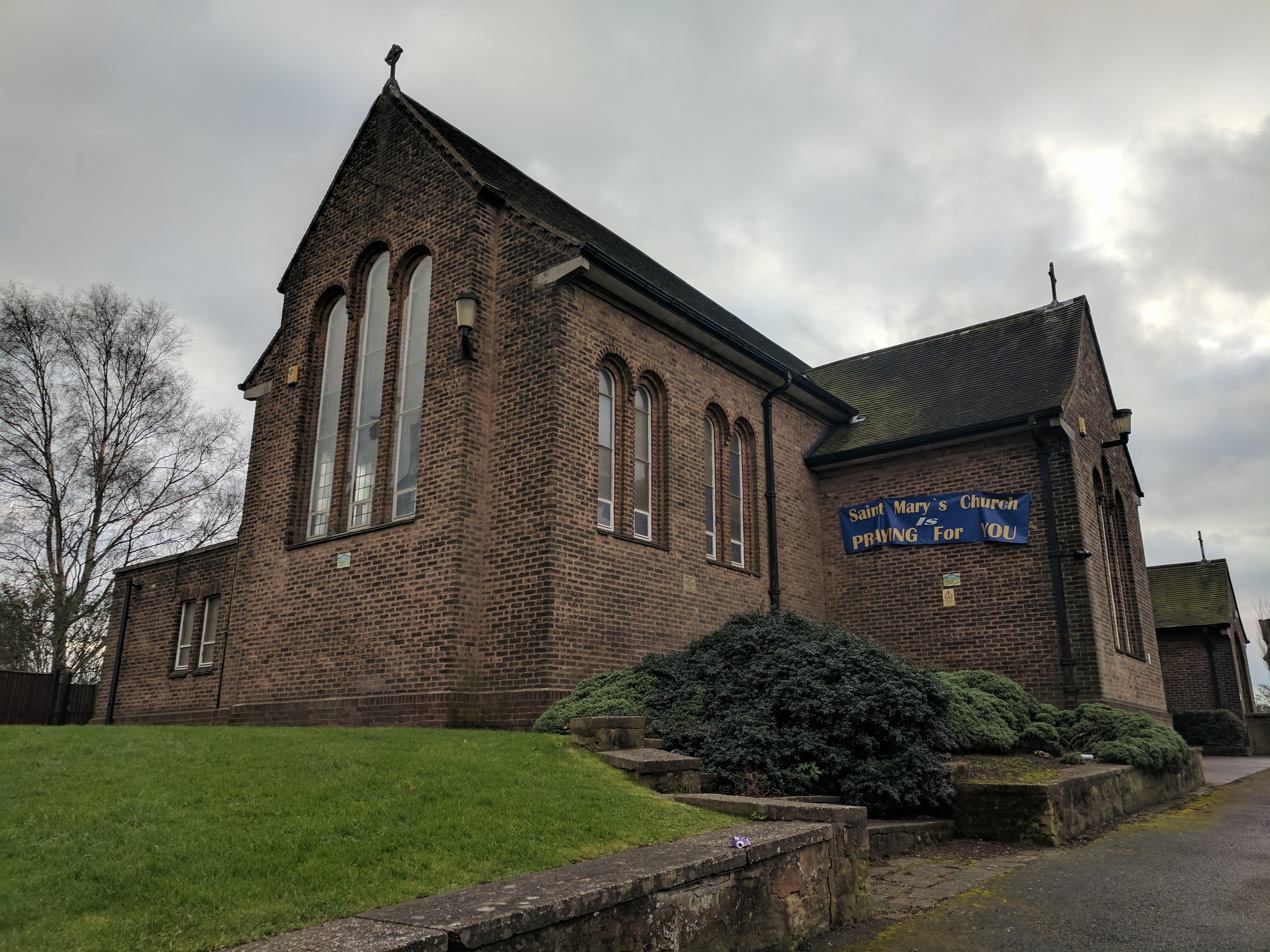
St Mary's high on a hill off Bancroft Lane Mansfield

Built after a new, post-war social housing project was established, St Mary's was the first church built in Mansfield after St Lawrence's in 1909. Designed by Nottingham architect Nat Lane, it was consecrated in July 1957. The formal name is Church of Saint Mary the Virgin, and the colloquial name is derived from an association with the saying "the brook of Our Lady".

== See also ==
- Listed buildings in Mansfield (inner area)

== Sources ==
- The Buildings of England, Nottinghamshire. Nikolaus Pevsner
