= Listed buildings in Mansfield (inner area) =

Mansfield is a town in the Mansfield District of Nottinghamshire, England. The town and its surrounding area contain over 200 listed buildings that are recorded in the National Heritage List for England. Of these, one is listed at Grade I, the highest of the three grades, nine at Grade II*, the middle grade, and the others are at Grade II, the lowest grade. Mansfield was a royal manor in the 11th and 12th centuries, and since the Middle Ages it has been the main market centre for west Nottinghamshire. During the Industrial Revolution, mills were built long the River Maun, and the town also became a centre for stocking frame knitting, but few buildings from this period have survived.

This list contains the listed buildings in the inner area of the town, those that are within the ring road. Most of these are houses and associated structures, shops and offices. The others include churches and items in churchyards, a market cross, public houses, former schools, public buildings, former mills, a monument, a railway viaduct and a railway station, and war memorials.

The listed buildings in the outer areas surrounding the town are at Listed buildings in Mansfield (outer areas).

== Key ==
Grade	Criteria
I	Buildings of exceptional interest, sometimes considered to be internationally important
II*	Particularly important buildings of more than special interest
II	Buildings of national importance and special interest

== Buildings ==
Name and location	Photograph	Date	Notes	Grade
St Peter and St Paul's Church; 53.14352°N 1.19300°W		12th century	The church has been altered and extended through the centuries, it was restored in 1870, and repairs and additions were made by C. Hodgson Fowler in 1902. It is built in stone with roofs of lead and tile. The church consists of a nave with a clerestory, north and south aisles, north and south porches, a south transept, a chancel and a west tower. The tower, which is the oldest part of the church, has three stages, string courses, and a west doorway with a round arch and a hood mould, above which is a round-arched window. The bell openings have two lights, and at the top is an embattled parapet, and a recessed octagonal spire with pedimented lucarnes, a ball finial and a weathercock. There are also embattled parapets along the body of the church.	I
The Swan Hotel; 53.14418°N 1.19570°W		c. 1584	The hotel was extended to the left in about 1870. The front is rendered and painted, with stone dressings, and the roofs are tiled. The original part has three storeys and attics, four bays, and two gables. The doorway has a round-arched head, Ionic columns and pilasters, voussoirs and a keystone. Above the ground floor is a full-width glazed canopy on cast iron brackets, and the windows are sashes. The extension to the left is slightly recessed and has two storeys and attics, and three bays, and two coped gables. On the ground floor is an arcade of round-arched casement windows, and above are sash windows, those in the attic in dormers.	II
13, 15 and 17 Bridge Street; 53.14401°N 1.19221°W		Late 16th century	A house, later a shop, in stone partly rendered, with brick and stone dressings and a slate roof. There are two storeys, two bays, and a lower rear wing. On the ground floor is a shop front with a fascia and a doorway to the right, above is a painted sundial with a stepped head containing initials and a date, and the top floor contains two three-light mullioned casement windows. The rear wing has an upper floor jettied on corbels, and a brick coped gable.	II
The Old Ram Public House; 53.14361°N 1.19387°W		Late 16th century	The public house, which has been altered, has a timber framed core. On the front is applied timber framing with rendered infill, it is on a plinth and the roof is slated. On the right gable is original timber framing with close studding. There are two storeys and two bays, and a lean-to extension on the left. In the centre is a doorway with a hood, and the windows are casements. The rear is rendered, and has a pantile roof.	II
21 Church Street, Mansfield; 53.14404°N 1.19452°W		c. 1600	A house, to which a shop front was added in about 1880. The front is in stone with chamfered floor bands, moulded eaves and a slate roof. There are three storeys and a single bay. On the ground floor is a 20th-century shop front, and the upper floors contain paired sash windows with chamfered surrounds. The house at the rear is in sandstone with a pantile roof, and has two storeys.	II
Old Market Cross; 53.14562°N 1.19835°W		c. 1600	The market cross is in stone, and has a tapering shaft surmounted by a cubical sundial with brass gnomons and a ball finial. It stands on a chamfered plinth and a square pedestal, on a square base of two steps.	II
Cromwell House; 53.14655°N 1.19903°W		Mid-17th century	A house that has been restored and converted into offices, it is in stone on a plinth, and has chamfered eaves, and a slate roof with coped gables. There are two storeys and attics, a T-shaped plan, a front of seven bays with three gables, and rear extensions. The central doorway has pilasters, an inscribed lintel, and a hood on consoles. The windows are sashes, and in the attic are three through-eaves dormers containing three-light mullioned windows with hood moulds.	II
New Inn Public House; 53.14688°N 1.19921°W		Mid-17th century	The public house is in stone, the front with painted stucco, on a rendered plinth, with a floor band and a slate roof. There are two storeys and attics, three bays, and a lower two-storey rear wing. In the centre is a doorway with paterae, flanked by casement windows. The upper floor contains sash windows, and in the attic are two gabled dormers with pierced bargeboards. In the right gable are two three-light mullioned casement window with hood moulds.	II
The Old Parsonage; 53.14421°N 1.19935°W		Mid-17th century	A house, later offices, in stone, with brick gables and a tile roof. There are two storeys and attics, a front range of four bays, and a rear wing with a pantile roof. The doorway has a fanlight, and is flanked by sash windows. On the upper floor are cross-casement windows, and the attics contain two gabled dormers. In the rear wing is a horizontally-sliding sash window and five-light mullioned casements.	II
5 Bridge Street; 53.14398°N 1.19277°W		Late 17th century	A house, later a house and a shop, in stone and brick, partly rendered and painted, with a slate roof. The gable end faces the street, and is coped with kneelers. There are two storeys and attics, two bays, and a projecting extension. In the gable end is a shop window with a doorway to the left, and two-light windows above. In the right return are two horizontally-sliding sash windows, a casement window and a raking dormer.	II
1, 2 and 3 Rock Court; 53.14456°N 1.19221°W		Late 17th century	A row of three houses, a stable and a cartshed, in stone, with pantile roofs with stone slate verges. They are in two storeys and two storeys with attics, with five bays, and a single-bay addition to the left. They contain doorways, casement windows and raking dormers.	II
7 and 9 Toothill Street; 53.14551°N 1.19463°W		Late 17th century	A house, possibly with a timber framed core, and applied external timber framing with rendered infill, and a tile roof. There are two storeys and two bays. On the ground floor is a doorway flanked by early 20th-century shop fronts with fascias on shaped brackets, and the upper floor contains sash windows.	II
62 and 64 West Gate; 53.14622°N 1.19892°W		Late 17th century	Two houses, later shops, in stone on a plinth, both with two bays and sash windows. No. 62 on the right has three storeys and a gable with traceried bargeboards, and on the ground floor is a shop front. No. 64 has two storeys, and on the ground floor is a late 19th-century shop front with pilasters and a cornice, and a door with a fanlight, and to its right is an entry containing a lead pump in a wooden case, and a stone trough.	II
72 and 74 West Gate; 53.14696°N 1.19931°W		Late 17th century	A house, later two shops, it was refronted in the 19th century, it is stuccoed and has a pantile roof. There are two storeys and attics, and two bays. On the ground floor is a 19th-century shop front, with a fascia on brackets, to the left is a window and a door with a fanlight, and to the right is an entry. The upper floor contains sash windows, and in the attic are raking dormers.	II
The Bridge Tavern Public House; 53.14405°N 1.19249°W		Late 17th century	A house, later a public house, in stone with roofs of tile, pantile and slate. There are two storeys and attics, and a T-shaped plan, with a main range of five bays, and rear extensions. The windows are a mix of sashes, and casements, some of the latter with mullions.	II
St Peter's House; 53.14395°N 1.19312°W		Late 17th or early 18th century	The house is in stone with a sill band, quoins, moulded eaves and a hipped slate roof. There are two storeys and attics, and five bays. The central doorway has a moulded surround with a keystone, and a segmental pediment on consoles. The windows on the front are sashes, and on the roof are three segmental-headed dormers. On the left return are mullioned cross-casement windows, and at the rear is a two-light stair window.	II*
The Old Meeting House; 53.14474°N 1.19985°W		1702	The church, which has been altered and extended, is in stone on a plinth, with rusticated quoins and a hipped slate roof. There are two storeys and four bays. On the entrance front is a concrete porch added in 1940, that has a cornice and a coped parapet. The windows are casements, some with mullions and/or transoms. At the rear is a round window with a moulded surround.	II*
Old Grammar School; 53.14303°N 1.19297°W		1714–19	The grammar school, which has been extended, and later converted into a parish hall, is in stone with slate roofs. The main block has a plinth, moulded eaves, two storeys and six bays. There is a gabled porch containing a round-arched doorway with imposts and a keystone, above which is an inscribed panel. The windows are mullioned casements. On one of the later extensions is a gabled bellcote, a finial and two gabled ventilators.	II
46–52 Leeming Street and 3 and 5 Toothill Lane; 53.14561°N 1.19484°W		Early 18th century	A house, later shops and offices, in stone, with applied timber framing and rendered infill, a painted stone cornice and tile roofs. There are three storeys, five bays on Leeming Street and four on Toothill Lane. On the ground floor are shop fronts with a recessed corner entrance. On the upper floors, most of the windows are casements with mullions. To the right on Toothill Lane is a two-storey extension with sash windows.	II
17 and 19 Albert Street, Mansfield; 53.14274°N 1.19599°W		Mid-18th century	A house, later two shops, in stone with a slate roof. There are two storeys and attics, and three bays. On the ground floor are two 20th-century shop fronts with doorways, the upper floor contains sash windows, and in the attic are three box dormers.	II
53, 55 and 57 Stockwell Gate; 53.14359°N 1.20045°W		Mid-18th century	Three houses, later shops, in stone, partly rendered, with quoins, chamfered eaves, bracketed gutters and a tile roof. There are three storeys and five bays. On the ground floor are three late 20th-century shop fronts under a full-width 19th-century cornice. The upper storeys contain two-light mullioned casement windows and one single-light window.	II
61 and 63 West Gate; 53.14627°N 1.19933°W		Mid-18th century	Two houses later used for other purposes, in stone, with quoins, sill bands, a moulded eaves cornice, bracketed gutters and a slate roof. On the ground floor is a late 20th-century shop front with a fascia, to its left is a doorway, and further to the left is a large recessed entrance. The middle floor contains Venetian windows with keystones, and on the top floor are three-light mullioned windows.	II
Westgate House; 53.14475°N 1.19668°W		Mid-18th century	Two houses, later shops, in stone, with quoins on the right, rebated eaves, bracketed gutters and a slate roof. There are three storeys and three bays. On the ground floor are 20th-century shop fronts with plastic fascias, and the upper floors contain sash windows with projecting surrounds.	II
Former Moot Hall; 53.14466°N 1.19663°W		1752	The moot hall, later used for other purposes, is in stone with quoins, a moulded main cornice, and a hipped slate roof. There are three storeys and seven bays, the middle three bays projecting slightly under a pediment containing a carved coat of arms in the tympanum, and a frieze with initials and paterae. The ground floor contains a doorway with a fanlight, windows with aprons, and in the middle three bays are reeded pilasters and a cornice on scroll brackets. On the upper floors are top-hung casement windows.	II
Waverley House; 53.14548°N 1.19854°W		1754	A house, later offices, in stone on a plinth, with chamfered quoins, floor bands, a modillion main cornice, and slate roofs with a single coped gable. There are three storeys, five bays, and a rear wing. The central doorway has a pediment on Doric columns, and is flanked by windows with Gibbs surrounds and rusticated aprons. The other windows are sashes with eared architraves, cornices and aprons, the window above the doorway also with volutes, a pseudo-balustrade and a curly dentilled dated pediment.	II*
5 and 7 Stockwell Gate; 53.14423°N 1.19750°W		c. 1770	A pair of houses, later two shops, in painted brick with a slate roof, and a coped gable. There are three storeys and attics, and four bays. On the ground floor are late 20th-century shop fronts with a tiled surround and a plastic fascia, and the upper floors contain sash windows with projecting surrounds.	II
Church House; 53.14318°N 1.19334°W		c. 1775	The house is in stone with moulded eaves, bracketed gutters, and a slate roof with coped gables. There are three storeys and three bays. To the left is a single-storey porch containing a round-arched doorway with imposts and a keystone. The windows are sashes with projecting surrounds, and in the right gable end is a tall round-arched stair window.	II
Town Mill Public House and wall 53.14368°N 1.19218°W		c. 1775	A water mill converted into a public house, it is in stone with floor bands, and a tile roof with a coped gable, and a square hipped ventilator. There are two storeys and attics, and ten bays. On the ground floor is an arcade of seven elliptical arches, one containing a doorway. Most of the windows are top-hung casements, and there are four gabled dormers. Attached to the left corner of the building is a stone boundary wall with half-round coping and a pointed-arched gabled gateway. Below is a tailrace opening with five square stone shafts and square capitals.	II
Former Charter Arms Public House; 53.14373°N 1.19720°W		Late 18th century	The former public house is in painted stucco, on a plinth, with stone dressings, quoins, a ground floor cornice, a string course, a sill band, dentilled eaves and a hipped slate roof. There are three storeys and fronts of three bays. On the corners are recessed entrances and doorways with fanlights. On the ground floor some of the windows are casements, and elsewhere they are sashes, those on the middle floor with closed pediments on consoles, and on the top floor with eared and shouldered architraves.	II
The White Hart Public House; 53.144108°N 1.19532°W		Late 18th century	A public house in stone on a plinth, with an eaves band, and a slate roof with coped gables and kneelers. There are three storeys and six bays. In the fourth bay is a doorway with a moulded surround, a fanlight and a cornice, and above this is a gable containing a loop. The windows are sashes with projecting surrounds.	II
7 West Gate; 53.14496°N 1.19704°W		c. 1780	A house, later a shop, it is stuccoed, with stone dressings, rebated eaves, bracketed gutters and a tile roof. There are three storeys and two bays, On the ground floor is a 20th-century shop front with pilasters, and a cornice on fluted brackets. The middle floor contains a full-width shop window with five round-cornered lights, and slender mullions with decorated spandrels, a fascia and a moulded cornice, and on the top floor are sash windows.	II
Westgate House, coach house and walls 53.14764°N 1.20031°W		c. 1780	The house and coach house, later offices, are in stone with slate roofs. The house has a plinth, an eaves cornice, and coped gables. There are three storeys and three bays. The central doorway has a moulded surround, a fanlight, and a pediment on scroll brackets. It is flanked by Venetian windows, and the upper floors contain sash windows, all the windows with projecting surrounds. The former coach house to the right has two storeys, two bays, and a hipped roof. On the upper floor are quatrefoils, and the lower floor contains French windows. In the right return is a pitching hole with a casement window below. The boundary wall forms a semicircle, and has flat coping and iron railings, and in the centre is a pair of square gate piers with moulded caps.	II
57 West Gate; 53.14617°N 1.19918°W		c. 1790	A house, later shops, in painted stone, with quoins, chamfered eaves and a slate roof. There are three storeys and three bays. On the ground floor are late 20th-century shop fronts with a fascia, and the upper floors contain sash windows with projecting surrounds.	II
11 and 13 Church Street, Mansfield; 53.14419°N 1.19513°W		c. 1800	Two houses, later shops, in stone with an eaves band and a slate roof. There are three storeys and five bays. In the centre of the ground floor is a doorway with a fanlight flanked by 20th-century shop fronts, and the upper floors contain sash windows.	II
15 Church Street, Mansfield; 53.14409°N 1.19475°W		c. 1800	Two houses, later a shop, in stone with an eaves band and a tile roof. There are three storeys and four bays. On the ground floor is a 19th-century double shop front with pilasters, a full-width fascia on brackets, and a recessed entrance flanked by shop windows. The upper floors contain sash windows with projecting surrounds.	II
32 and 32B Church Street, Mansfield; 53.14367°N 1.19396°W		c. 1800	A house, later shops, in brick with a stone front, an eaves band and a concrete slab roof. There are three storeys and three bays. On the ground floor is a late 19th-century shop front with pilasters, a fascia on ornamental brackets, and a splayed central recess. The upper floors contain casement windows with transoms.	II
36 Church Street, Mansfield; 53.14359°N 1.19374°W		c. 1800	A house, later an office, in stone with an eaves band and a concrete slab roof. There are three storeys and two bays. On the ground floor is a 19th-century shop front with pilasters, a small cornice and a doorway to the right, and to its left is a doorway with a stone surround. The upper floors contain sash windows with projecting surrounds.	II
3 Stockwell Gate; 53.14423°N 1.19737°W		c. 1800	A house, later a shop, in painted stone with a slate roof. There are three storeys and three bays. On the ground floor is a 20th-century shop front with a tiled surround, to the right is a round-headed entry and a carriage entrance. The upper floors contain sash windows, the middle window on the top floor blind.	II
39B, 41, 43 and 43A West Gate; 53.14570°N 1.19855°W		c. 1800	A house, later shops, it is rendered, and has quoins and a slate roof. There are three storeys, an L-shaped plan, and a front of five bays. In the centre of the ground floor is a doorway flanked by 20th-century shop fronts and fascias. The upper floors contain sash windows with moulded eared architraves.	II
65 West Gate; 53.14636°N 1.19940°W		c. 1800	A house, later a shop, in painted stone with a tile roof. There are three storeys and two bays. On the ground floor is a late 20th-century shop front with a fascia, and to its left is a single-pane shop window. The upper floors contain sash windows with projecting surrounds.	II
67 and 69 West Gate; 53.14646°N 1.19942°W		c. 1800	Two shops in stone and brick, No. 69 painted, with slate roofs. There are three storeys, and each shop has two bays. On the ground floor are late 20th-century shop fronts. The upper floor of No. 67 contains casement windows, the other shop has sash windows, and all have projecting surrounds.	II
69A West Gate; 53.14652°N 1.19947°W		c. 1800	A house, later a shop, on a corner site, in stone, partly rendered, with a slate roof. The main block has three storeys, two bays on West Gate and four on St John Street, with a two-storey two-bay extension on St John Street. The windows in both fronts are sashes, in St John Street is a round-arched stair window and a blocked window. The ground floor contains a mid-20th-century shop front with an angled entrance on the corner.	II
89–91 West Gate; 53.14709°N 1.19998°W		c. 1800	A pair of stone houses, the ground floor rendered and painted, with quoins, an eaves band, and a slate roof. There are three storeys and three bays. On the front are two round-arched doorways with imposts and keystones. Above the right doorway is a round-arched stair window with imposts and a keystone, and the other windows are sashes with projecting surrounds.	II
The Old Maltings; 53.14311°N 1.19426°W		c. 1800	The former malt house, later used for other purposes, is in stone with slate roofs. Along the street is a single-storey range with a doorway and nine small openings. At the rear is a two-storey symmetrical range of buildings, the middle building with a hipped roof, flanked by kilns. There are various openings, some blocked.	II
48 and 50 West Gate; 53.14595°N 1.19853°W		c. 1810	Two houses, later shops, that were restored in 1990. They are in stone, with quoins on the left, an eaves band, and a slate roof. There are three storeys and three bays. On the ground floor are two shop fronts, and an entry doorway with a lintel and a keystone on the left. The upper floors contain sash windows with projecting surrounds.	II
17 and 18 Market Place; 53.14426°N 1.19704°W		c. 1820	Two houses on a corner site, later an office, in painted stone, with string courses, a sill band and a low coped parapet. There are three storeys, and fronts of three and four bays. On the ground floor is a modern shop front with granite piers, a wooden fascia, and a recessed entrance in the corner. The upper floors contain sash windows.	II
37, 38 and 39 St John Street; 53.14635°N 1.20032°W		c. 1820	A row of three stone houses, rendered on the sides, on a plinth, with an eaves band and a slate roof. There are two storeys and six bays. On the front are three round-arched doorways with fanlights, a flat-headed passage doorway, two round-headed boot scrapers, and sash windows. All the openings have projecting surrounds.	II
40 St John Street; 53.14639°N 1.20012°W		c. 1820	A stone house on a plinth, with an eaves band and a slate roof. There are two storeys and three bays. The central doorway is round-headed, with a fanlight and a keystone, and the windows are sashes with projecting surrounds.	II
39 West Gate; 53.14560°N 1.19871°W		c. 1820	A house, later a shop, on a corner site, in stone, the front rendered and painted, with quoins and a hipped slate roof. There are two storeys and a front of two bays. On the ground floor is a 20th-century shop front and fascia, and above are two sash windows. On the left return is a round-arched doorway with a fanlight, and a sash window.	II
Midland Hotel; 53.14257°N 1.19863°W		c. 1820	A house converted into a hotel in about 1870, in painted stone on a plinth, with stone dressings, a string course, rusticated quoins, moulded eaves, and a tile roof. There are two storeys and five bays, and a single-storey extension on the left. In the centre is a porch with Doric columns and an open pediment, flanked by top-hung casement windows. The other windows are sashes and all have projecting surrounds.	II
9 and 11 Albert Street, Mansfield; 53.14288°N 1.19619°W		Early 19th century	Two houses, later a shop and an office, in stone with stepped eaves and a tile roof. There are three storeys and three bays. In the centre is a late 20th-century shop front, to its left is a recessed doorway with marble panelling and a lettered fascia. To the right is an elaborate stone shop front dating from about 1870 that has a shouldered opening with ringed square shafts and foliage capitals, and a hooded fascia on ornamental brackets. The upper floor contains casement windows.	II
5 and 7 Church Street, Mansfield; 53.14428°N 1.19551°W		Early 19th century	A pair of houses, later shops, No. 7 on the right slightly higher. They are in stone with tile roofs, and three storeys, and the shops have two bays each. On the ground floor are shop fronts flanking an entry, and the upper floors contain sash windows.	II
17 and 19 Church Street, Mansfield; 53.14406°N 1.19462°W		Early 19th century	A house, later a shop, the front rendered, with stone dressings, quoins, and a tile roof. There are three storeys and four bays. On the ground floor is a 20th-century shop front with a fascia, and to the right a recessed entry, and the upper floors contain sash windows with projecting surrounds.	II
10–16 Church Side; 53.14329°N 1.19349°W		Early 19th century	Four houses, later combined into a shop, in stone with painted stone dressings and a slate roof. There are two storeys and four bays. On the ground floor is a late 20th-century shop front and a doorway to the left, and the upper floor contains paired fixed light windows.	II
6 and 7 Market Place; 53.14400°N 1.19626°W		Early 19th century	Two houses, later a shop and an office, in painted stone, with a moulded cornice and a slate roof. On the ground floor is a 20th-century shop front, with a pair of doors divided by rusticated pilasters, and the upper floors contain sash windows.	II
8 Market Place; 53.14395°N 1.19626°W		Early 19th century	A house later used for other purposes, in stone, with a floor band, an eaves band and a slate roof. There are three storeys and a single bay. On the ground floor is a 20th-century shop front with a tiled surround and a plastic fascia, and the upper floors contain sash windows.	II
10 and 12 Stockwell Gate; 53.14439°N 1.19743°W		Early 19th century	A house, later used for other purposes, in painted stone with moulded eaves and a slate roof. There are three storeys and two bays. On the ground floor are 20th-century shop fronts and a doorway to the right, and the upper floors contain sash windows.	II
36, 38 and 38A West Gate; 53.14571°N 1.19804°W		Early 19th century	Two houses, later shops, in stone, with quoins, a moulded eaves cornice, and a slate roof with coped gables. On the ground floor are modern shop fronts, and the upper floors contain sash windows.	II
93, 95 and 97 West Gate; 53.14718°N 1.20009°W		Early 19th century	Three houses with framework knitters' workshops, later converted into a shop. It is in stone on a plinth, with an eaves band and a slate roof. There are three storeys and three bays. On the ground floor are doorways and shop windows. The windows on the front are sashes with projecting surrounds, in the right gable end are a casement window and a horizontally-sliding sash window, and at the rear are three four-light knitters' windows on the top floor.	II
Former Portland Arms Public House; 53.14270°N 1.19587°W		Early 19th century	The former public house is stuccoed, on a plinth, with a slate roof. There are two storeys and attics, and two bays. The central doorway has a reeded surround and a small pediment. The windows are top-hung casements, with wedge lintels and keystones, those on the ground floor with spearhead railings. On the roof are two gabled dormers with finials and shaped bargeboards.	II
Railway Inn Public House; 53.14226°N 1.19660°W		Early 19th century	The public house is in stone, painted on the front, with a tile roof. There are three storeys and an L-shaped plan, with a front range of three bays, and a two-storey three-bay rear wing. The central round-headed doorway has a fanlight, above it is a tall round-arched stair window, and the other windows are sashes.	II
The Dial Public House; 53.14407°N 1.19707°W		Early 19th century	The public house is in painted stone on a plinth, the ground floor is rusticated, and it has rebated eaves and a tile roof. There are three storeys and five bays. On the ground floor are four round-arched windows flanked by two round-arched doorways, all with fanlights, and the upper floors contain sash windows with projecting surrounds.	II
41 St John Street; 53.14643°N 1.19994°W		c. 1830	A chapel, later converted for other uses, in stone on a plinth, with an eaves cornice and a blocking course. There are three storeys and five bays, the middle three bays projecting under a pediment. On the ground floor are casement windows with transoms, and the upper floors contain sash windows. Projecting from the outer bays are porches, each with a cornice and a blocking course, containing a doorway with a cornice. Above the right porch is a casement window.	II
The Market Inn; 53.14419°N 1.19696°W		c. 1830	The public house is rendered, on a plinth, with stone dressings, a string course, a moulded eaves cornice and a slate roof. There are three storeys and attics, and four bays, angled in the centre. In the middle is a round-arched doorway with a moulded surround and a blank fanlight. This is flanked by pairs of cross-casement windows with pilasters and under a common cornice, and to the left is another round-arched doorway. The upper floors contain sash windows in projecting surrounds, and in the attics are gabled dormers with traceried bargeboards.	II
Westfield Folk House Youth Centre; 53.14823°N 1.20190°W		c. 1830	A house later used for other purposes, it is in stone on a plinth, with rebated eaves and a hipped slate roof. There are three storeys, three bays, and a two-storey service wing. On the front is a flat-roofed porch with paired Doric pilasters and a cornice, and a doorway with a moulded surround and a fanlight. The windows are sashes with lintels and double keystones. In the left return is a canted bay window with a parapet, and on the right return is a porch similar to that on the front, the doorway replaced by a window.	II
Churchyard wall and gates, St Peter and St Paul's Church; 53.14357°N 1.19344°W		1832	The wall is in stone with moulded coping, it is curved, and extends for about 200 metres (660 ft). Steps lead up to the main entrance that is flanked by square gate piers on pedestals. The gates are in wrought iron with openwork iron piers. To the left is a stone arch containing a notice board, and has a swept hipped slate roof.	II
The Old Town Hall, piers and railings 53.14387°N 1.19670°W		1835–37	The former town hall was designed by W. A. Nicholson in Classical style. It is in stone on a plinth, the ground floor is rusticated, and there is a string course, a cornice and blocking course, and a hipped slate roof. The building has two storeys and a basement, a front of three bays, and four bays on the sides. The middle bay projects, and has a raised parapet containing a clock face. It contains a tetrastyle Greek Doric portico with an entablature and a triptych frieze. The windows are sashes, those on the upper floor with projecting surrounds, and cornices on consoles. In front of the outer bays are spiked railings and square stone piers with flat caps.	II*
Former Probate Office; 53.14392°N 1.19706°W		1841–42	Originally a bank and courthouse, later used for other purposes, it is in stone on a rusticated plinth, with string courses, sill bands, a dentilled cornice, and a hipped slate roof. There are two storeys and three bays. In the centre is a portico with Doric pilasters and a cornice, and a doorway with a fanlight. The ground floor windows are sashes with pilasters and cornices, and on the upper floor are cross-casement windows with projecting surrounds and pediments. At the rear is a range, and two two-storey pavilions.	II
Cavendish Monument and railings 53.14428°N 1.19651°W		1849	The monument in the centre of Market Place, designed by T. C. Hine, commemorates Lord George Bentinck. It is in stone, and in Gothic Revival style. It has a square base, a square pedestal with a plinth and an inscription, and corner pedestals each with a seated lion carrying a gilt metal banner. Above is a square canopy with gabled angle buttresses, and a panelled base with shields. On each side is a cusped arch with a hood mould under a crocketed gable, above which is an elaborate crocketed spire with a finial, and a tier of traceried gabled lucarnes. The monument is enclosed by iron railings with spiked corner posts.	II*
Boundary wall and gates, St Philip Neri Church; 53.14842°N 1.20048°W		Mid-19th century	The entrance to the churchyard is splayed, and flanked by square brick gate piers with rebated corners and flat moulded caps, between which are wrought iron gates. Outside these are boundary walls with half-round coping, extending for about 120 metres (390 ft). To the left is a pair of square vermiculated gate piers with wrought iron gates.	II
St John's Church; 53.14656°N 1.20159°W		1855–56	The church, designed by H. I. Stevens is in stone with slate roofs, and consists of a nave with a clerestory, north and south aisles, north and south porches, a chancel, a vestry and a west steeple. The steeple has a tower with three stages, stepped buttresses, string courses, gargoyles, and a pierced balustrade. To the southwest is an octagonal stair turret with a trefoil frieze and a spire with a ball finial. On the west side is a doorway with a moulded surround, shafts and a hood mould, above which is a four-light window with a pointed arch. The bell openings have two lights, and the tower is surmounted by a recessed octagonal broach spire, with three tiers of gabled lucarnes, a ball finial and a weathercock.	II
Wall and gate piers, St John's Church; 53.14624°N 1.20170°W		1856	Flanking the entrance to the churchyard is a pair of square stone gate piers with stepped gabled tops and trefoils, between which are wrought iron gates. The boundary wall is in stone with gabled coping, and extends for about 150 metres (490 ft).	II
Bridge Street Methodist Church; 53.14409°N 1.19160°W		1864	The church is in stone on a plinth, with rusticated pilasters, an eaves band and a hipped slate roof, and is in Italianate style. There are two storeys, a main front of three bays and six bays along the sides. The main front has a floor band, a moulded cornice, and a pierced balustrade with urns on corner pedestals. The middle bay is recessed and contains a portico in antis flanked by column and pilasters with Corinthian capitals. Above it is a round-arched triple window with a polychrome head, a hood mould, a keystone and a dated cornice. The ground floor windows on the front and sides have triangular heads, and those on the upper floor are round-arched with polychrome heads and keystones, and all have hood moulds.	II
Wall and gates, Bridge Street Methodist Church; 53.14391°N 1.19192°W		1864	The boundary wall is in stone with chamfered coping and railings, and extends for about 75 metres (246 ft). The main gate piers are square, in stone, with truncated pyramidal caps and cast iron gates. To the left is a side gate that has square gate piers with chamfered tops and a cast iron gate.	II
Railway viaduct 53.14400°N 1.19513°W		1871–72	The viaduct was built by the Midland Railway, and is in brick faced in stone. It consists of 13 round arches on a slight curve, and has a string course, pointed voussoirs, a flat coped parapet, and pilaster buttresses.	II
Mansfield railway station 53.14219°N 1.19872°W		1872–75	The railway station was built by the Midland Railway, and designed by J. H. Sanders in Italianate style. It is in stone on a plinth, with a string course, rusticated quoins, moulded eaves and hipped slate roofs. There is a single storey and eleven bays. The central entrance is in the form of a Venetian window, and contains a doorway with a moulded surround, a fanlight, and a scroll keystone. The windows in the flanking bays are sashes with cornices on scroll brackets. The platform side has a moulded cornice and a parapet, and in the centre are three round arches with moulded heads and square piers.	II
23A Market Place; 53.14459°N 1.19672°W		c. 1875	A bank, later a shop, in stone, with polychrome stone dressings, angle pilasters, rebated eaves and a tile roof. There are three storeys and three bays. On the ground floor is a shop front with a moulded surround, panelled pilasters, and an enriched cornice. The middle floor contains round-headed sash windows with an impost band, fluted keystones and a hood mould, and on the top floor are flat-headed sash windows with segmental heads, a lintel band and a moulded sill band, and between them are fluted terms.	II
Wall and gate piers, Old Grammar School; 53.14316°N 1.19307°W		Late 19th century	The boundary wall is in stone with gabled coping, it is curved, and extends for about 200 metres (660 ft). In the centre is a gateway flanked by square piers with pyramidal caps, and to the left is a smaller gateway with similar piers.	II
9 Stockwell Gate; 53.14419°N 1.19767°W		1888	A public house, later a bank, in stone, on a plinth, with fluted angle pilasters, cornices, a coped parapet, and a slate roof with a moulded and shouldered central gable. In the centre is a round-cornered doorway with a moulded surround, panelled pilasters, an enriched keystone and floral spandrels, flanked by shop windows. Above the doorway is an oriel window on a fluted bracket, and a frieze with swags, above which is a pedimented dated gable. The flanking windows are tripartite sashes with panelled pilasters. Above the windows are double swags, and below them are shaped aprons.	II
3 Market Street; 53.14341°N 1.19670°W		1889	A former bank in stone, on a plinth, with a slate roof. There is a single storey with an attic and a single bay. On the ground floor is a doorway with pilasters, a segmental-headed fanlight, and a pediment on fluted curved brackets. To the right is an elliptical-headed window with a moulded surround, imposts and a keystone. Above it is a moulded cornice, and a dormer with a shouldered shaped coped gable and a cornice, surmounted by a pedimented datestone, and flanked by a coped parapet.	II
11 Leeming Street; 53.14492°N 1.19569°W		c. 1900	A shop faced with faience, it has three storeys and five bays. On the ground floor are modern shop fronts under a continuous fascia. Between the bays on the middle floor are Ionic columns, the windows have three lights under a moulded elliptical arch, and impost bands. Above them is a cornice and a frieze with roundels. The middle bay of the top floor is flanked by Ionic columns on pedestals, above it is a shouldered dentilled semicircular gable with volutes and a finial, and it contains an elliptical-arched three-light window with mullions. Each outer bay contains a three-light windows, and above is a pierced coped balustrade with pedestals and finials.	II
Former bank at junction with Queen's Walk; 53.14352°N 1.19671°W		c. 1900	The bank on a corner site, later used for other purposes, is in stone on a granite plinth, with a sill band, cornices, a ramped coped parapet with volutes, and a slate mansard roof. There are two storeys and attics, fronts of two bays, and an angled bay on the corner. The corner bay contains a doorway with an elliptical head, panelled pilasters, and a triple-scroll keystone, above which is a round window. The ground floor contains rusticated quoins, between which are elliptical-headed windows with keystones linked by a curved band. On the upper floor are cross-casement windows with moulded rusticated surrounds and keystones, between which are paired fluted Ionic pilasters. In the attic are five dormers with Ionic pilasters and open pediments containing cartouches.	II
Imperial Buildings; 53.14529°N 1.19510°W		1901	A block of offices and shops in red brick with stone dressings, a floor band, a string course, a main cornice with breaks, and a pierced balustrade with moulded coping. There are three storeys and three wide bays, and on the ground floor are modern shop fronts on granite plinths and between them are pilasters with enriched capitals. The middle bay is flanked by pilasters surmounted by pedestals and ball finials. On the middle floor is a canted oriel window, above which is a three-light window with a canted balcony, a parapet with an inscribed tablet, and a coped pediment containing the date. The windows are sashes with pilasters, and between the upper floors are aprons with floral panels.	II
Mansfield Community Arts Centre; 53.14592°N 1.19450°W		1904	Originally a Carnegie library, the upper floor was added in 1932, and it was converted into an arts centre in about 1975. The building is in brick with a stone front and dressings, on a plinth, with sill band, a cornice, a coped parapet with a stepped panelled central pedestal, and a hipped slate roof, and it is in Baroque style. There are two storeys, and five bays. In the centre is a loggia with two Doric columns in antis, above which is a massive pediment with a swagged keystone. In the pediment is a semicircular recess containing an inscription and carving. In each outer bay is a porch with Doric pilasters and a broken pediment, the left one containing a casement window with an apron, and the right one a wrought iron screen and a doorway.	II
1 Market Place; 53.14424°N 1.19594°W		1909–12	A former bank on a corner site in stone on a granite plinth with quoins, a dentilled main cornice, a secondary cornice, a balustrade with volutes, and a slate mansard roof. There are three storeys and attics, fronts of four and five bays, and an angled bay on the corner. The corner bay has a doorway with rusticated Doric columns and dentilled cornice, and above is a lead dome and a finial. On the rusticated ground floor are round-arched windows with rusticated voussoirs and scroll keystones. The sash windows on the middle floor are divided by Doric half columns on Church Street and by pilasters on Market Place, and in the attic are shouldered round-headed dormers.	II
Brunt's Buildings; 53.14544°N 1.19493°W		1915	A block of offices with shops below on a corner site, in brick with dressings in stone and concrete, quoins, a lintel band, modillion eaves, and slate roofs with coped gables. There are two and three storeys, and fronts of nine and ten bays, with an angled bay on the corner. On the ground floor are modern shop fronts, and above are sash windows, those on the middle floor with keystones. On the top floor of the corner bay is a round-headed niche containing the life-size statue of a man, above which is a square clock turret with corner volutes, a lead dome and a weathervane.	II
War memorial, St Peter and St Paul's Church; 53.14334°N 1.19317°W		c. 1920	The war memorial in the churchyard is in stone. It consists of a crucifix on a tapered octagonal shaft with a moulded base. This stands on an octagonal pedestal with a plinth, on an octagonal base of three steps. On the pedestal are inscribed granite tablets.	II
Memorial Wall, The Old Meeting House; 53.14478°N 1.20025°W		1920s	The memorial wall in the grounds of the meeting hall is in sandstone and contain two bronze plaques. Each plaque is recessed between pilasters with shaped feet, on a bracketed shelf. Above them is a cornice, under which is a copper wreath containing the letter Omega. The plaques have inscriptions and the names of those lost in the First World War, and under the right plaque is a smaller plaque with the names of those lost in the Second World War.	II
Former Head Post Office; 53.14389°N 1.19464°W		c. 1925	The former post office is in brick with a stone front, angle pilasters, and a moulded cornice. There are three storeys, and eight bays. The ground floor is rusticated and has a central doorway with a moulded surround, a keystone and a cornice, and to the right is a round-arched cart entrance with a double keystone and wrought iron gates. The windows are casements, those on the middle floor with keystones. Between the bays on the upper floors are giant Ionic pilasters.	II
St Philip Neri Church and presbytery 53.14836°N 1.20089°W		1925	The church is in brick with stone dressings and a tile roof, and consists of a nave with a clerestory, north and south aisles, a north chapel and baptistry, and a chancel that has an apse with a copper dome, and side chapels. On the east gable is a bell turret with a Celtic cross. The west gable is pedimented, it has three bays, and contains a central doorway with shafts, a cornice, and a semicircular hood with relief carving in the tympanum. Above the doorway is a round-arched niche with imposts and a keystone containing a statue, and in the outer bays are round-arched windows with aprons. The presbytery is linked to the church by a flat-roofed corridor, and it has a hipped roof, two storeys and three bays. The middle bay projects, and has rusticated pilasters, and the windows are sashes with keystones. On the garden front are two two-storey canted bay windows.	II
