= St Peter and St Paul's Church, Mansfield =

Coordinates: 53°08′37″N 01°11′35″W

St. Peter and St. Paul's Church, Mansfield
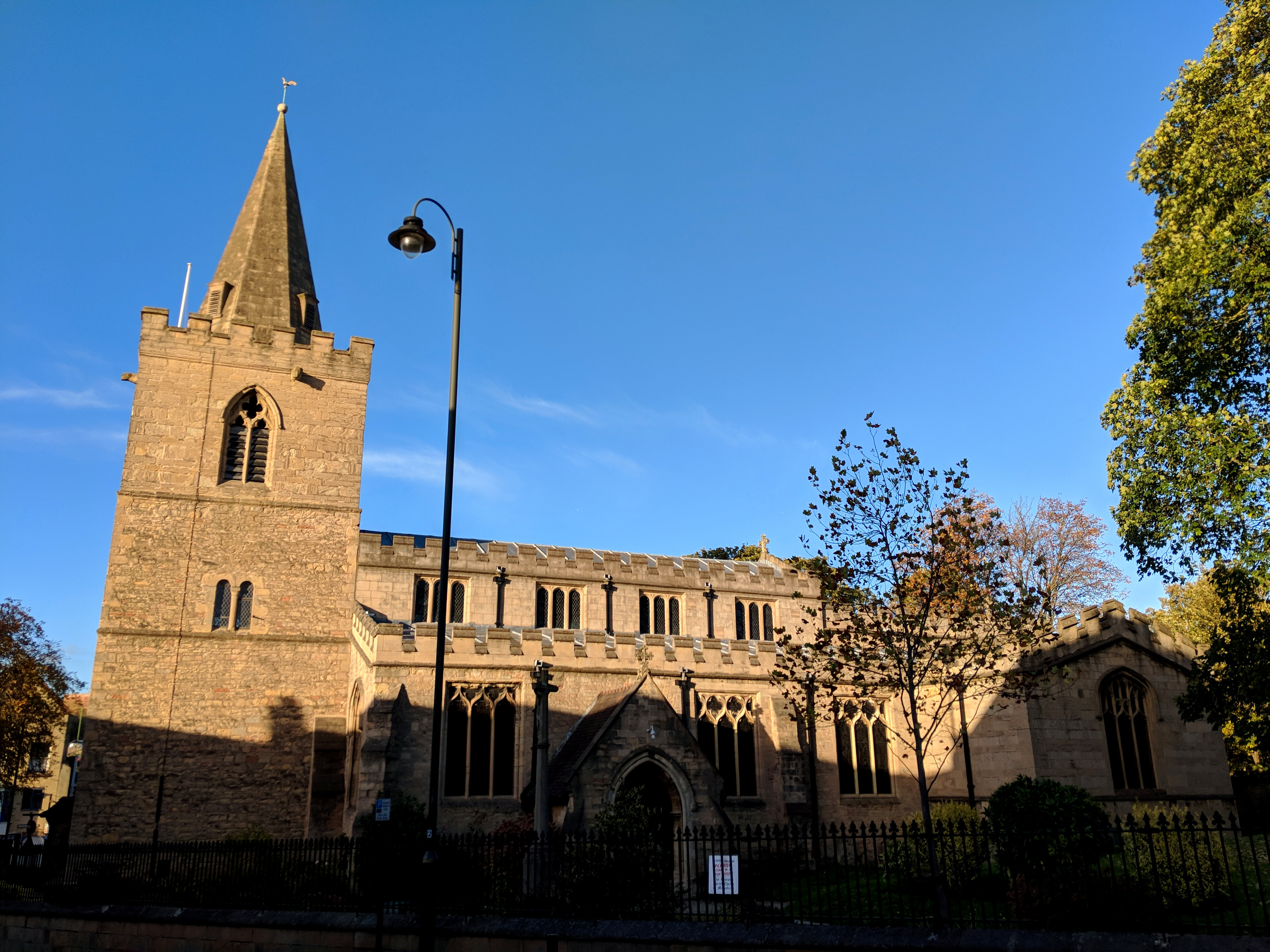
- St. Peter and St. Paul's Church, Mansfield
- Location: Church Side Mansfield Nottinghamshire NG18 1AP
- Denomination: Church of England
- Churchmanship: Broad Church
- Website: St Peter & St Paul's Church Mansfield

History
- Dedication

Listed Building – Grade I
- Official name: St. Peter and St. Paul's Church, Mansfield
- Designated: 19 December 1955
- Reference no.: 1214166

Listed Building – Grade II
- Official name: Boundary wall and gates to the churchyard of St. Peter and St. Paul’s Church
- Designated: 12 May 1993
- Reference no.: 1288704

Administration
- Province: York
- Diocese: Southwell and Nottingham
- Parish: Mansfield

Clergy
- Vicar: Rev Caroline Phillips

St. Peter and St. Paul's Church, Mansfield is a parish church in the Church of England located in the town centre of Mansfield, Nottinghamshire. The church, war memorial and railings south of the church are listed for special architectural interest. The church is mentioned in Domesday book in 1086.

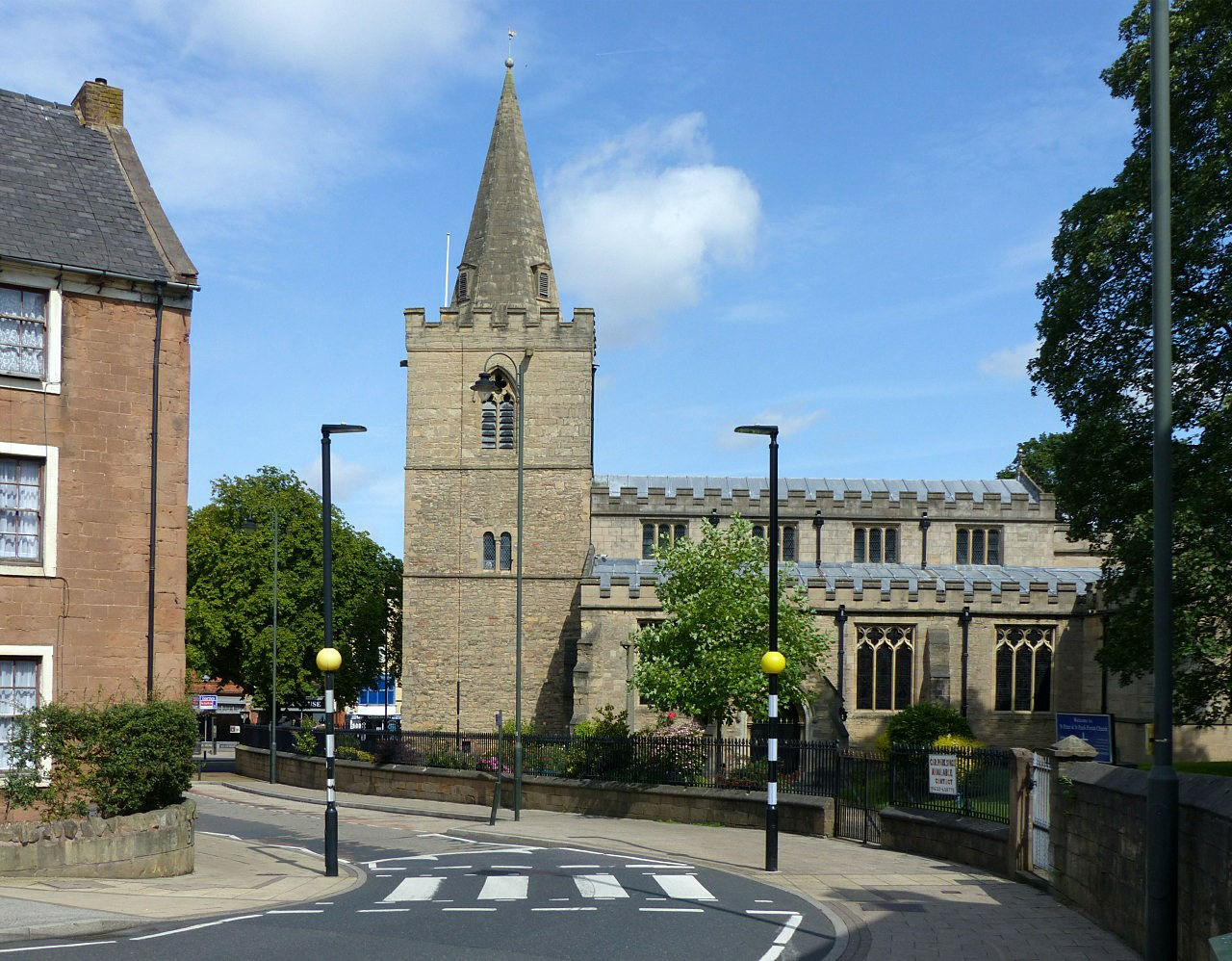
Church of St Peter and St Paul, Mansfield

== History ==
A portion of St Peter’s and St Paul’s Church is Norman. In 1096 the church was transferred by William II to Robert Bloet, Bishop of Lincoln. In the 12th century a new stone nave and chancel were built, towards the latter end of this century the church expanded in line with the population of Mansfield. In the 13th century further additions were added including a new aisle and two altars. In 1304 the church was almost entirely destroyed by fire, but was then restored by 1420. The 14th century also saw the church tower raised. In 1428 Henry VI subsidy the church continued to be annexed to the Bishop of Lincoln.

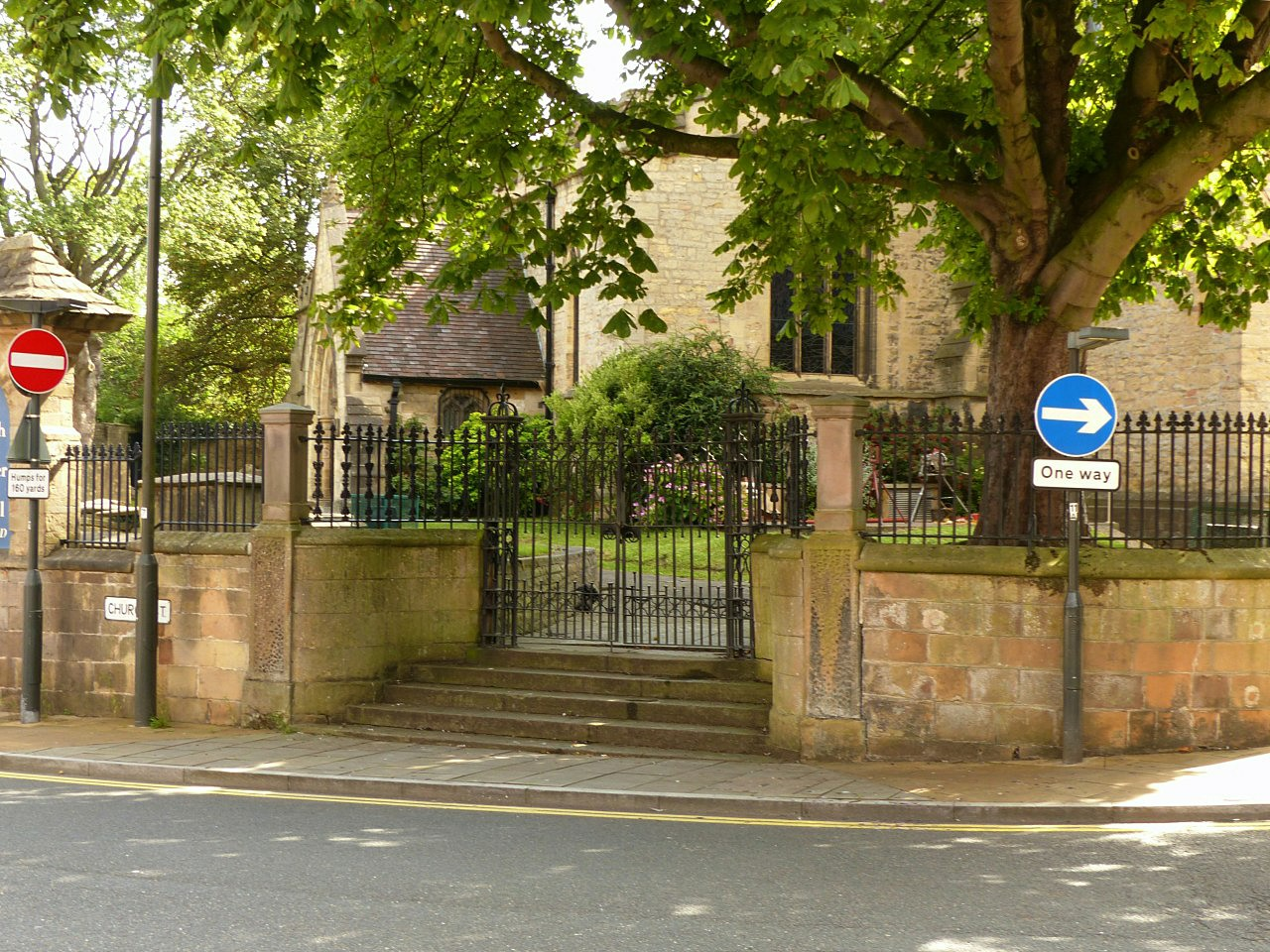
Boundary Wall and Gates

In 1521 Dame Cecilly Flogan, a business owner, gave land which was given to the church for 99 years. In 1557 Mary I (Mary Tudor) and King Phillip issued a charter which allowed the church to hold land. The steeple was added in 1583, although this has been disputed saying that the steeple was added in 1666. In the north aisle there is Maymott Brass of 1714 which commemorates Queen Anne.

George Fox the founder of the Quakers lived in Mansfield in 1647 at the site of St Phillip Neri Church. George said in his journal ‘and as I was walking by the steeplehouse side, in the town of Mansfield the Lord said unto me, that which people do trample upon must be thy food. And as the Lord spoke he opened it to me how that people and professors did trample upon the life, even the life of Christ was trampled upon…’. The steeplehouse in Mansfield was the church of St Peter and St Paul.

In 2013, the church held a 900-year celebration, claiming to have evidence that the original tower was completed by December, 1113.

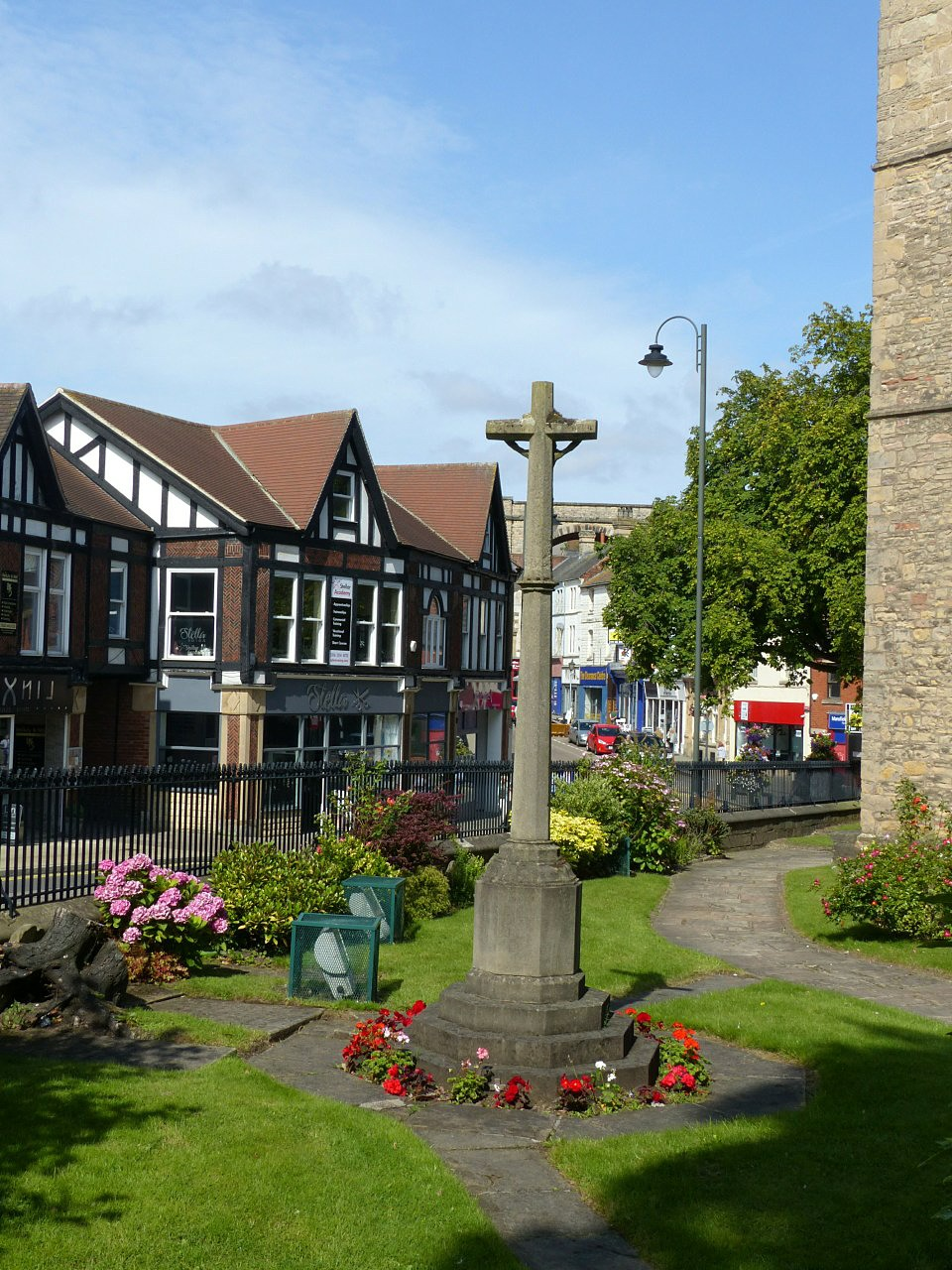
War Memorial at the church

== Bells ==
There are eight bells in the tower dating from 1603. The bells were cast in 1948.

== Organ ==
The 3-manual church organ was acquired in 1970 from Clare College, Cambridge It was substantially altered and enlarged by Noel Mander of London before installation in the south chapel in 1971. There was further work and restoration done, and the organ was re-consecrated at the end of 2000.

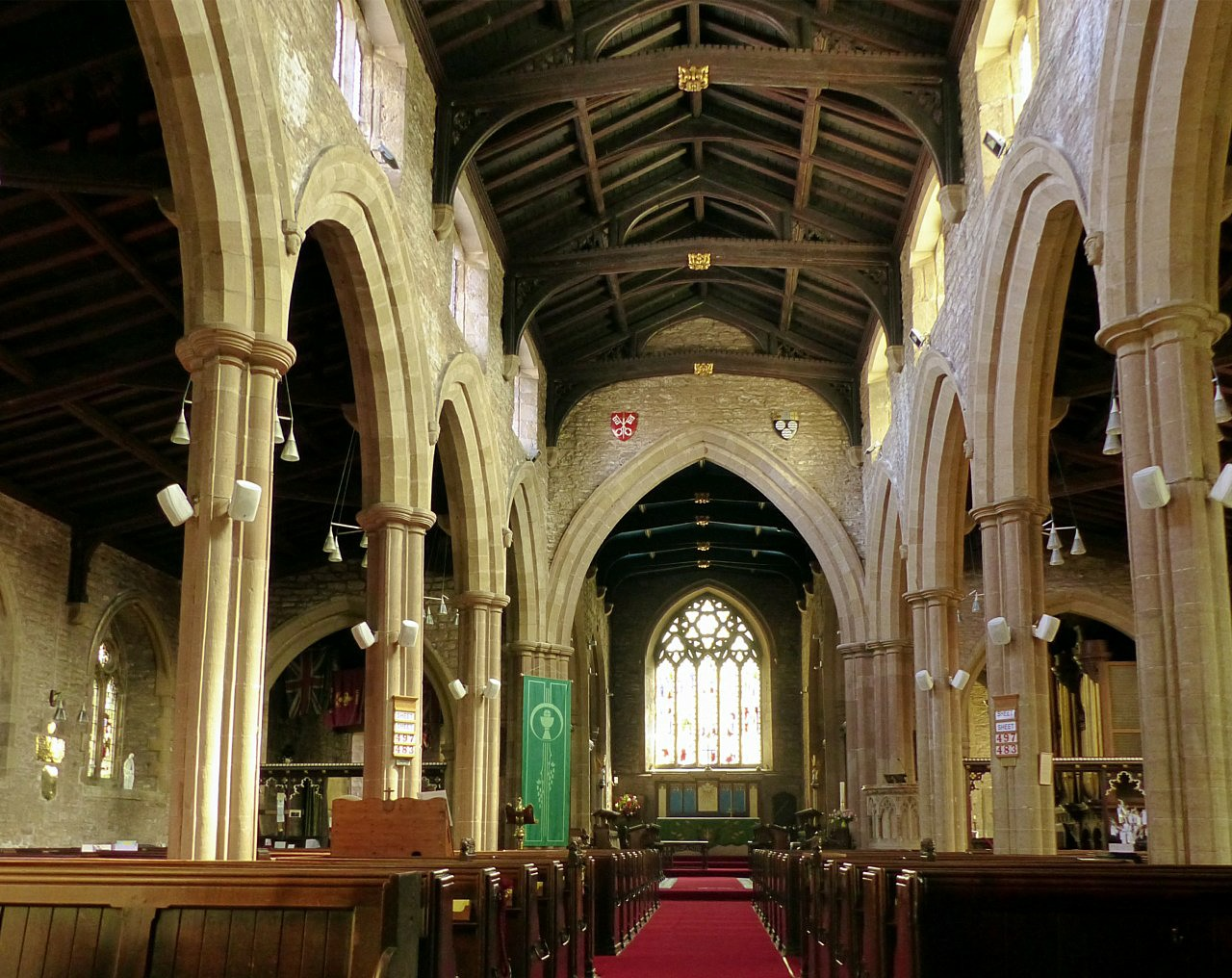
The Church interior

=== Organists ===
- Maria Lister 1795–1801
- Joseph Webster ca. 1829
- Miss Cursham ca. 1869
- William Blakely 1883–1891
- Arthur Howard Bonser 1889–1902
- Miss M Coleman 1904–1911
- Dr George P Allen 1911–1957 (formerly organist of St. Peter's Church, Stapenhill, Burton upon Trent)
- C K Turner 1957–1959
- Malcolm Cousins 1959–1993
- David Sheeran Butterworth 1993–1995
- John Gull 1996
- David Cowlishaw 1997
- John P Rose 1998–2007
- Paul Hayward 2007-8
- John Marriott 2009-

== See also ==
- Grade I listed buildings in Nottinghamshire
- Listed buildings in Mansfield (inner area)

== Gallery ==
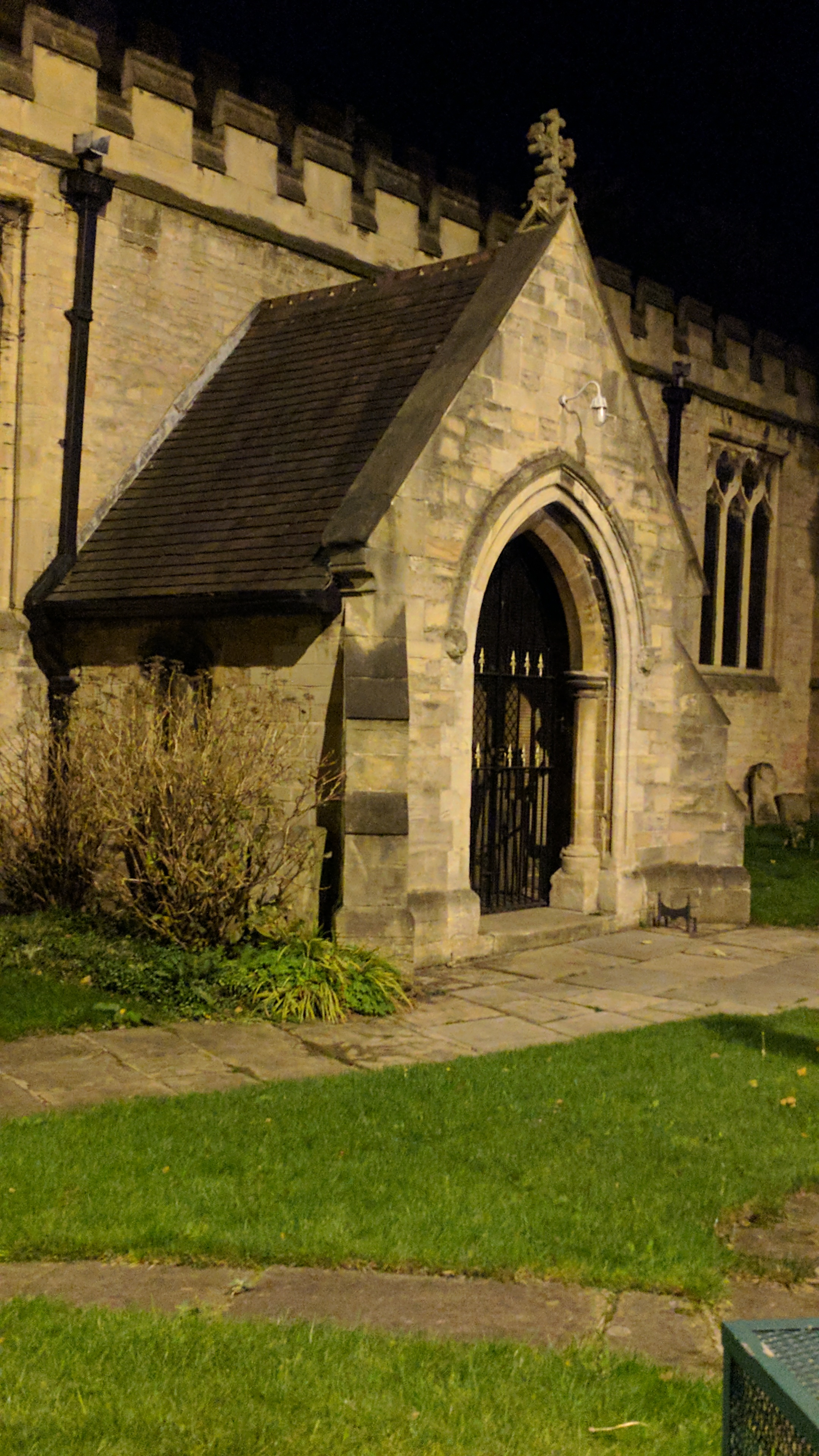

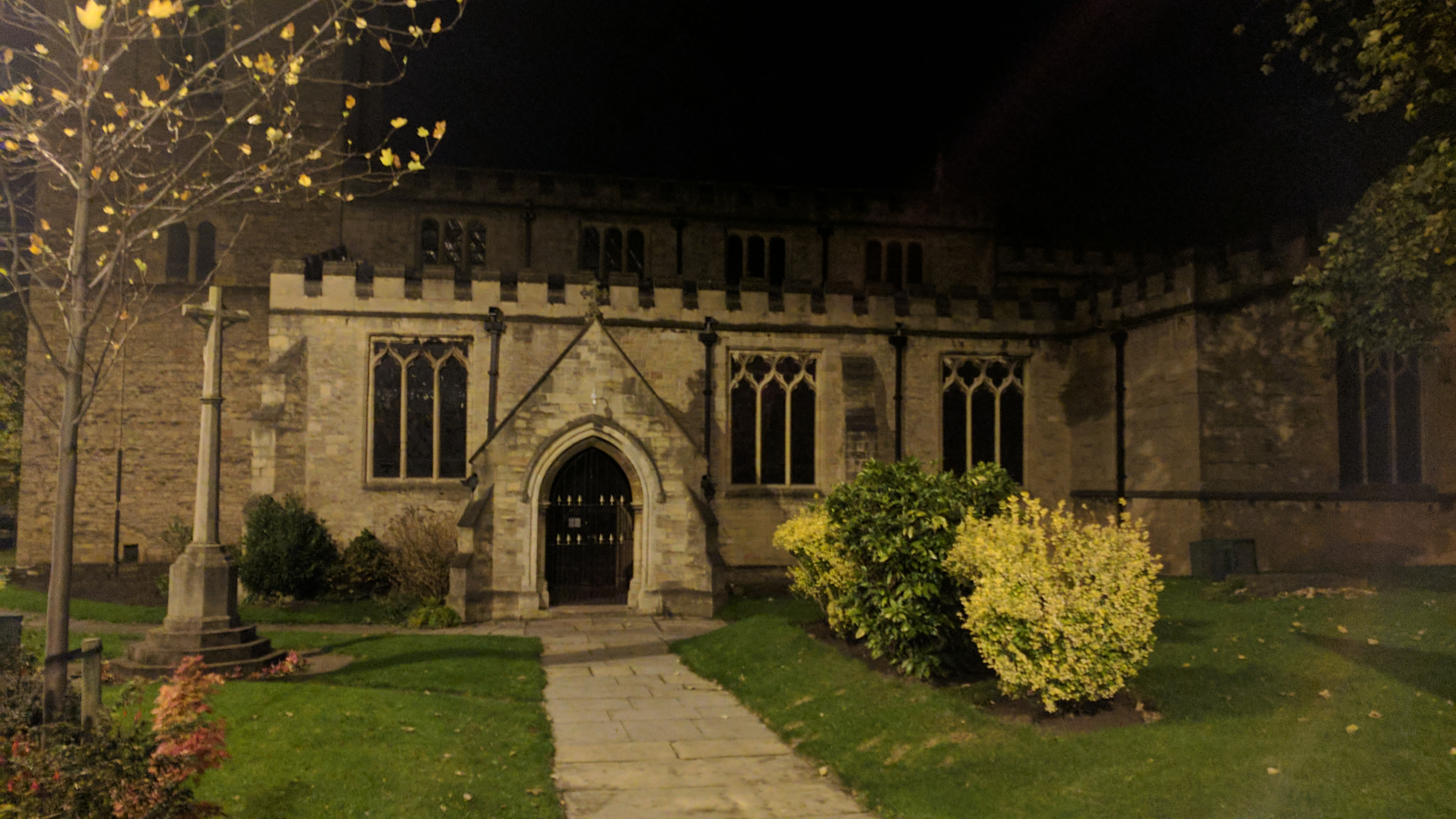

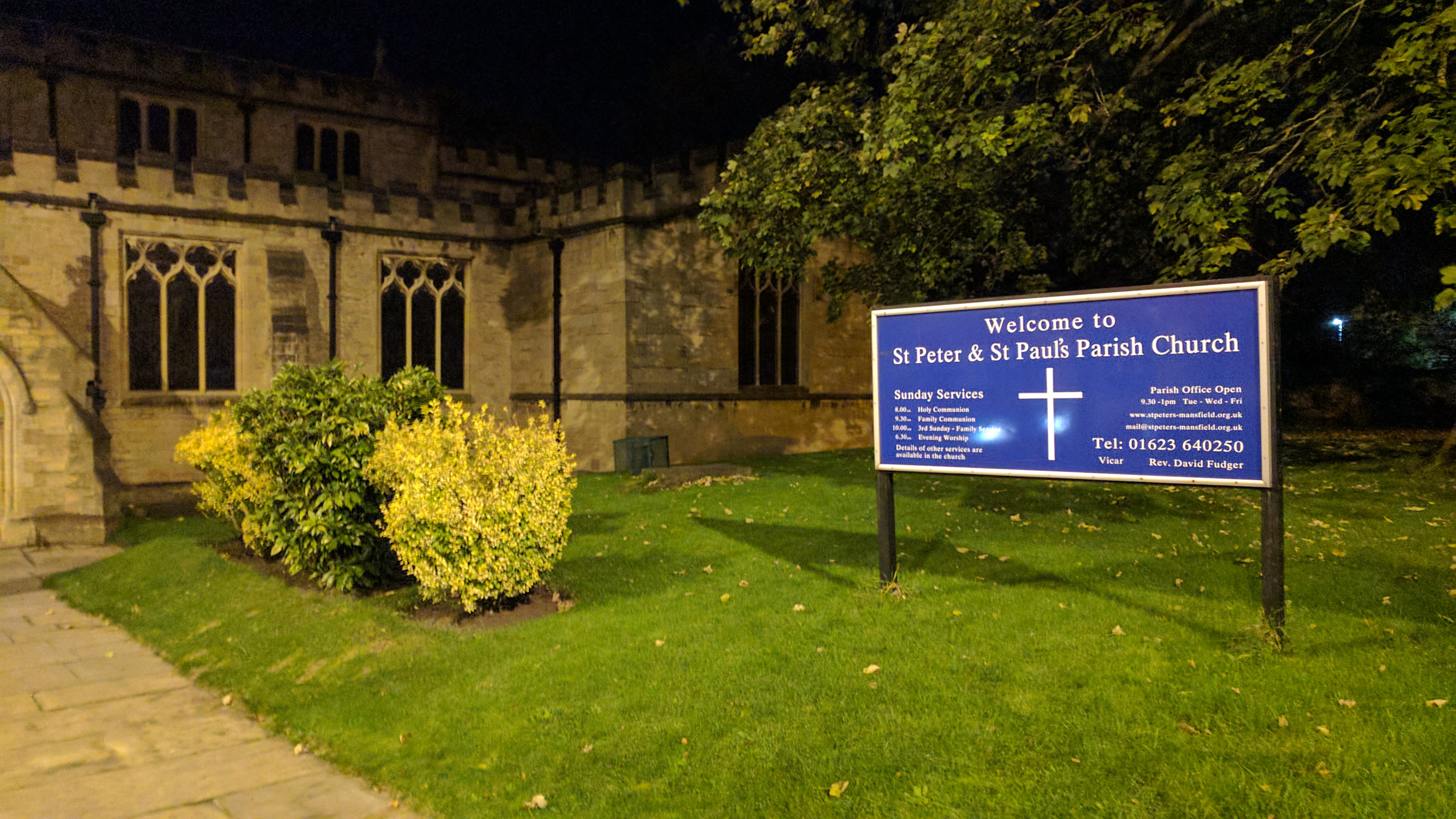

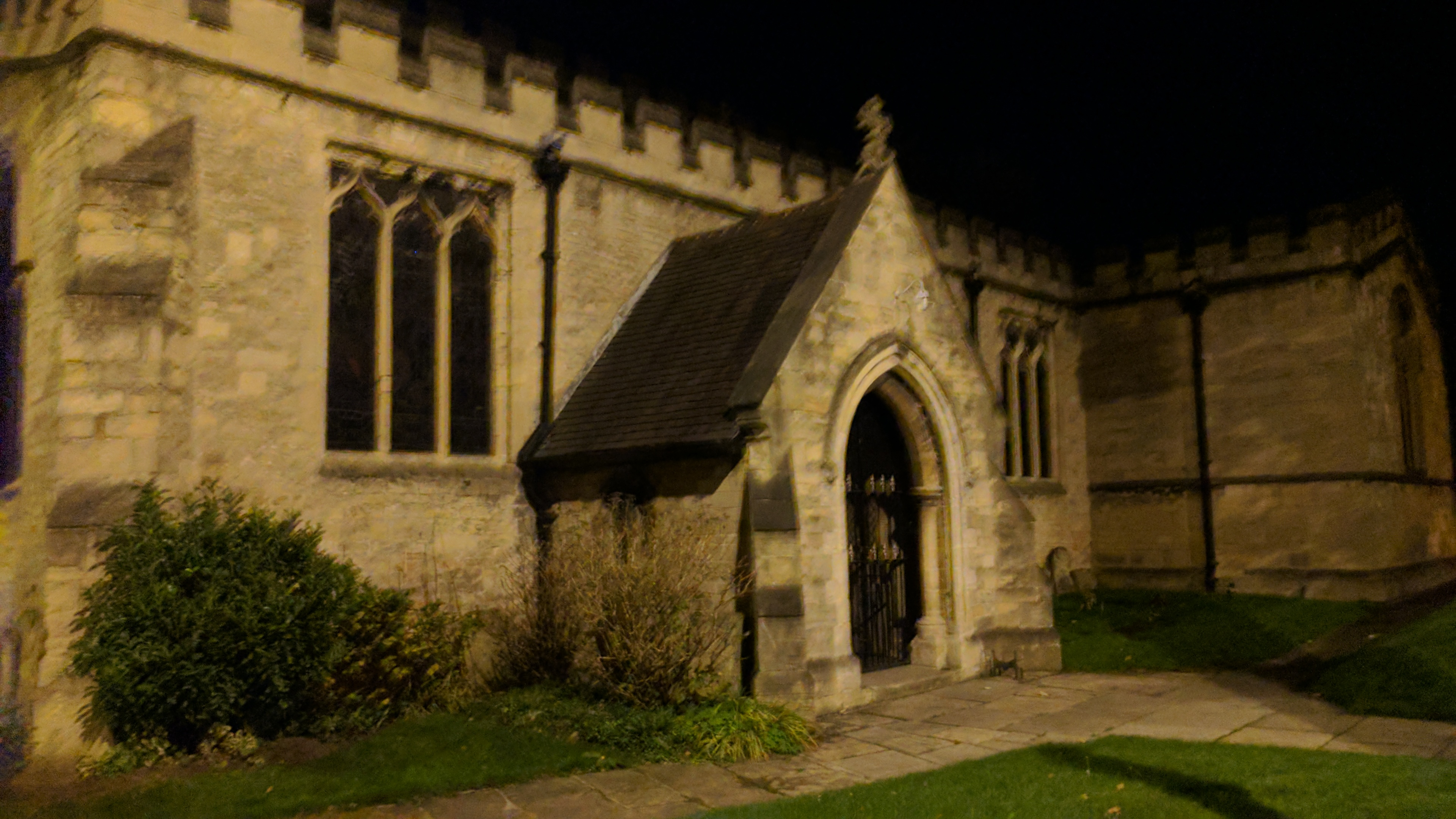

== Sources ==
- The Buildings of England, Nottinghamshire. Nikolaus Pevsner
