= Chad (newspaper) =

Regional newspaper for Mansfield and Ashfield, England

- News you can trust since 1952
- Type: Weekly newspaper
- Publisher: National World
- Founded: 1952
- Language: English
- City: Mansfield and Ashfield, Nottinghamshire
- Country: England, United Kingdom
- Circulation: 4,593 (as of 2023)
- Website: Chad

Chad (also known as the Mansfield Chad) is a weekly regional newspaper for Mansfield and Ashfield, Nottinghamshire, England. The newspaper was first published using the name "Mansfield and North Nottinghamshire Chronicle Advertiser" on 3 April 1952; its common short name was formed as a portmanteau of "Chronicle Advertiser".

The last issues of the previous iterations, the Mansfield Chronicle and the Mansfield Advertiser, were published on 27 March 1952.

Chad staff held their 60-year anniversary celebrations at the Old Town Hall on 4 April 2012.

Traditionally family owned and published by W. & J. Linney Ltd, their newspaper interests including Chad were sold to Johnston Press plc in November, 1995 for £20 million.

Chad is a member of the Independent Press Standards Organisation.

== See also ==
- List of newspapers in the United Kingdom
