= St Philip Neri Church, Mansfield =

Church in Nottinghamshire, England

St Philip Neri Church
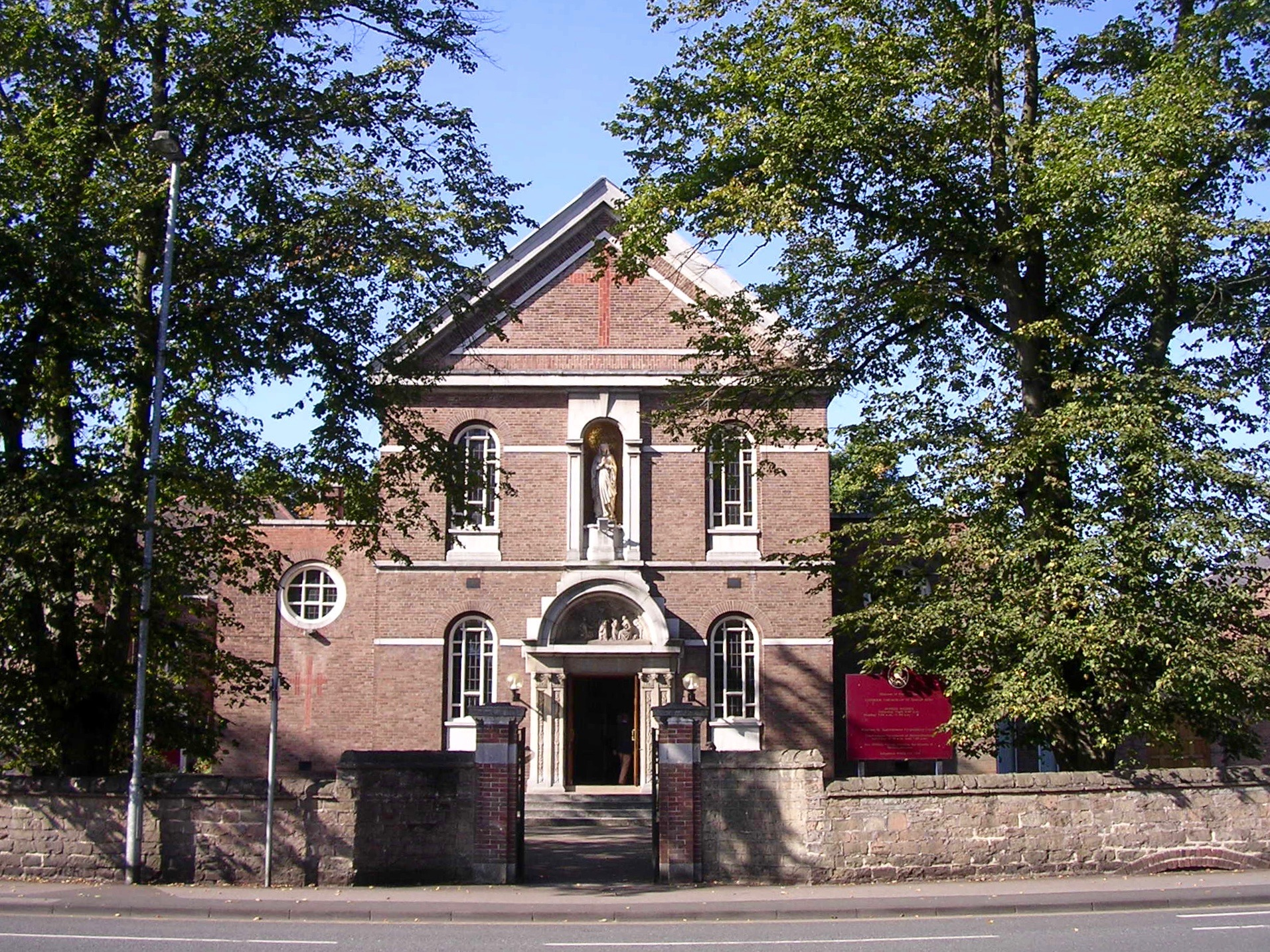
- St Philip Neri Church
- 53.1483°N 1.201°W
- Location: The Presbytery; 3 Chesterfield Road South, Mansfield NG19 7AB
- Country: England
- Denomination: Roman Catholic
- Website: St. Philip Neri, Mansfield

History
- Status: Active
- Founder: Edward Bagshawe
- Dedication: Philip Neri

Architecture
- Functional status: Parish church
- Heritage designation: Grade II listed
- Designated: 18 January 1994
- Architect: Charles A. Edeson
- Style: Italian Baroque
- Groundbreaking: 6 June 1924
- Completed: 25 March 1925

Administration
- Province: Westminster
- Diocese: Nottingham
- Deanery: Sherwood
- Parish: St Philip Neri

St Philip Neri Church is a Roman Catholic parish church in Mansfield, Nottinghamshire, England. It was founded by Edward Bagshawe, Bishop of Nottingham. Built from 1924 to 1925, the design by Charles A. Edeson was influenced by Brompton Oratory, where Bishop Bagshawe formerly served. It is located on Chesterfield Road South to the north of the town centre. It is in the Italian Baroque style and is a Grade II listed building.

== History ==
Prior to the church existing on the site, it was in this area which George Fox had a cottage in 1647, George Fox was the founder of the Quakers. George started his ministry in Mansfield.

=== Foundation ===
For a short while during 1862, a priest would come from Ilkeston to celebrate Mass in the Catholic Church in a property in Chandler's Court. In 1876, a Mrs Susanna White bought and then gave the Manor House in Ratcliffe Gate to Bishop Bagshawe. In 1877, St Philip Neri Chapel was opened there. In 1878, a building housing a school and a chapel was built in the grounds of Manor House. It was designed by a Mr Christopher Gray from London.

=== Construction ===
In 1921, the priest there, a Fr Charles Payne sought to build the current church. The successor to Bishop Bagshawe, Bishop Brindle gave the land to the parish. On that site, on 6 June 1924, the foundation stone was laid by Bishop Brindle's successor, Thomas Dunn. The church was designed by a local architect, Charles Alva 'Percy' Edeson. On 24 March 1925, the church was consecrated and opened by the Archbishop of Westminster, Cardinal Bourne, the next day, 25 March, the feast of the Annunciation. In 1926, Fr Payne moved to Derby, his successor Fr John Keogh went about getting the church decorated and installed the paintings. In 1934, the work was completed. It was done by Hardman & Co. and the cost came to £2,000. The total cost of the church came to £17,500. In 1932, the parish hall was built.

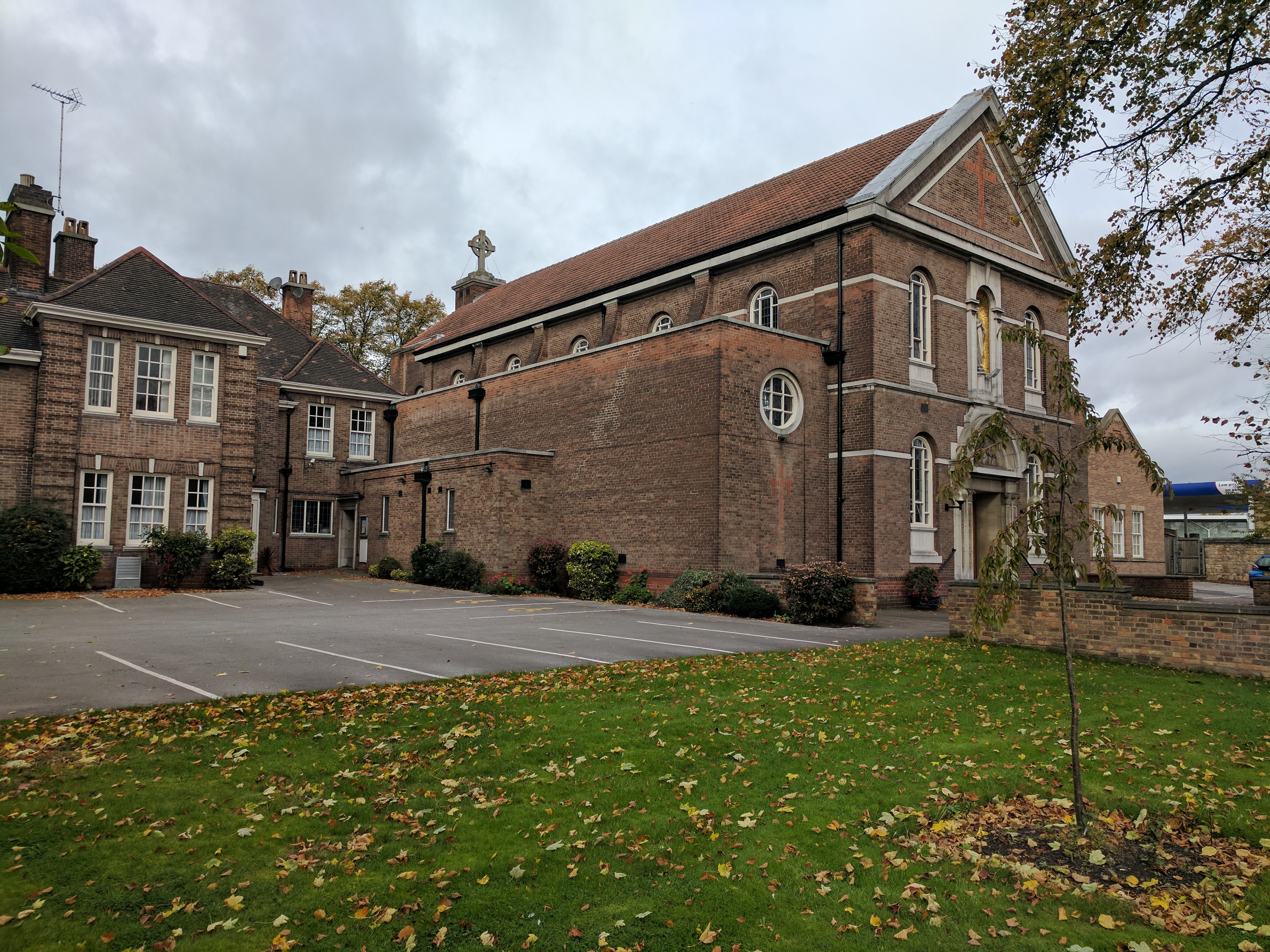
The Church from the Car Park

== Parish ==
The parish of St Philip Neri Church works other with other parishes in and around Mansfield, such as St Joseph's Church in Shirebrook, St Bernadette's Church in Bolsover, St Teresa's Church, Market Warsop and St Patrick's Church in Forest Town. St Philip Neri Church has four Sunday Masses at 6:00pm on Saturday, 9:00am, 11:00am and 5:00pm on Sunday.

== See also ==
- Listed buildings in Mansfield (inner area)
- Diocese of Nottingham
