= Primera Iglesia Evangélica Metodista Buenos Aires =

First Methodist Church built in South America

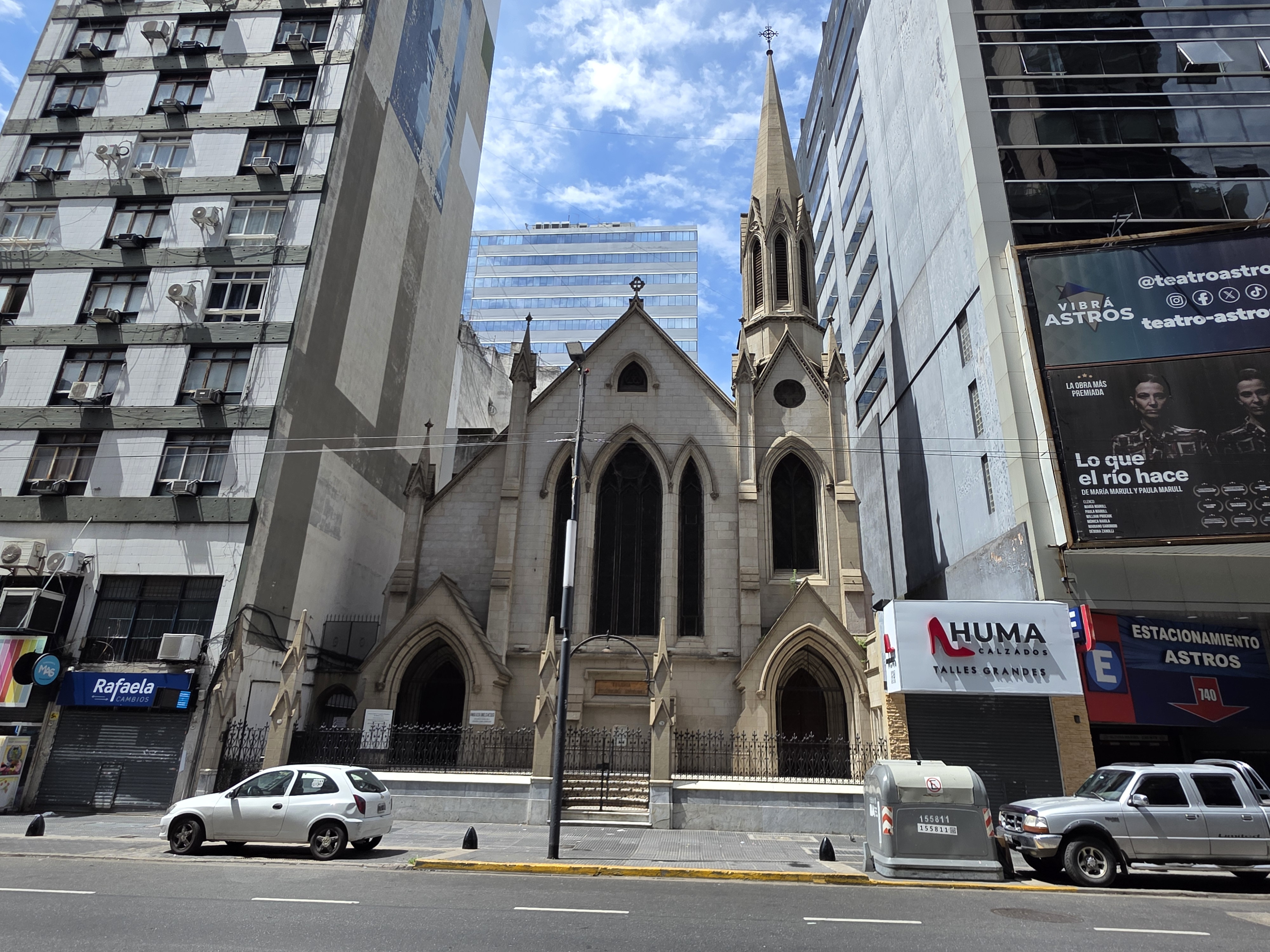
- current facade of Iglesia Evangélica Metodista Argentina

Religion
- Sect: Methodist movement
- District: Buenos Aires
- Rite: Protestantism

Location
- Country: Argentina

Architecture
- Architect: Henry Hunt
- Style: neo-gothic
- Founder: John Wesley
- Funded by: John Dempster (Argentina)
- Established: 1836
- Completed: 1874

Primera Iglesia Evangélica Metodista Buenos Aires is a temple of Methodist religion located in the city of Buenos Aires. It was the first Church of Methodist religion in South America, established in Buenos Aires since 1836.

== History ==
The Evangelical Methodist Church was introduced in Argentina at the initiative of the government of the Argentine Confederation. who entrusted the New York Reverend John Dempster, the mission of serving the large number of American, British and German immigrants who professed the Protestant religion.

It was originally located on Cangallo street (current Juan Domingo Perón), between 25 de Mayo and Reconquista, neighborhood of San Nicolás, Buenos Aires. The new temple was made by the architect Enrique Hunt, and inaugurated in 1874, on Corrientes Street at 718 Buenos Aires City.

== Gallery ==
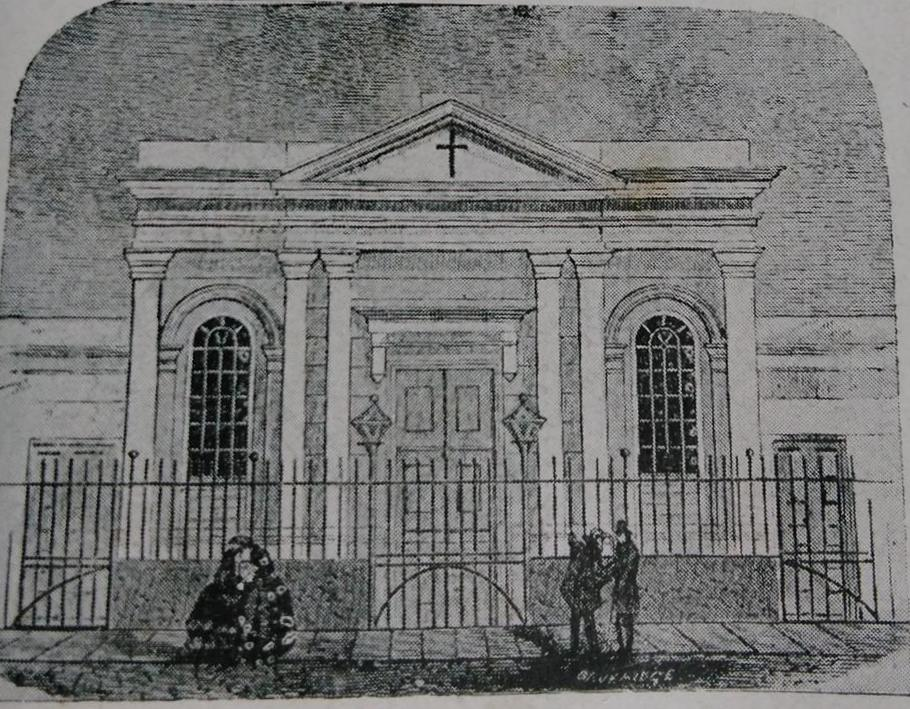
Painting of the first temple located on Cangallo street.

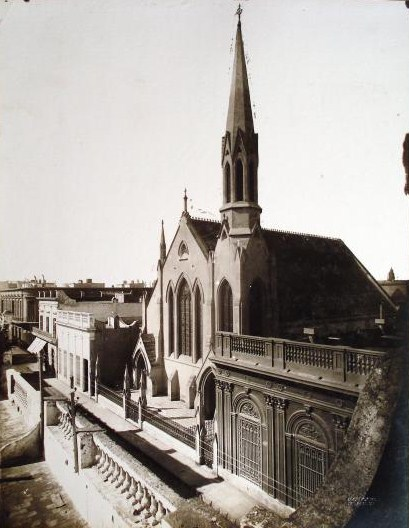
Original facade of the New Temple inaugurated in 1875.

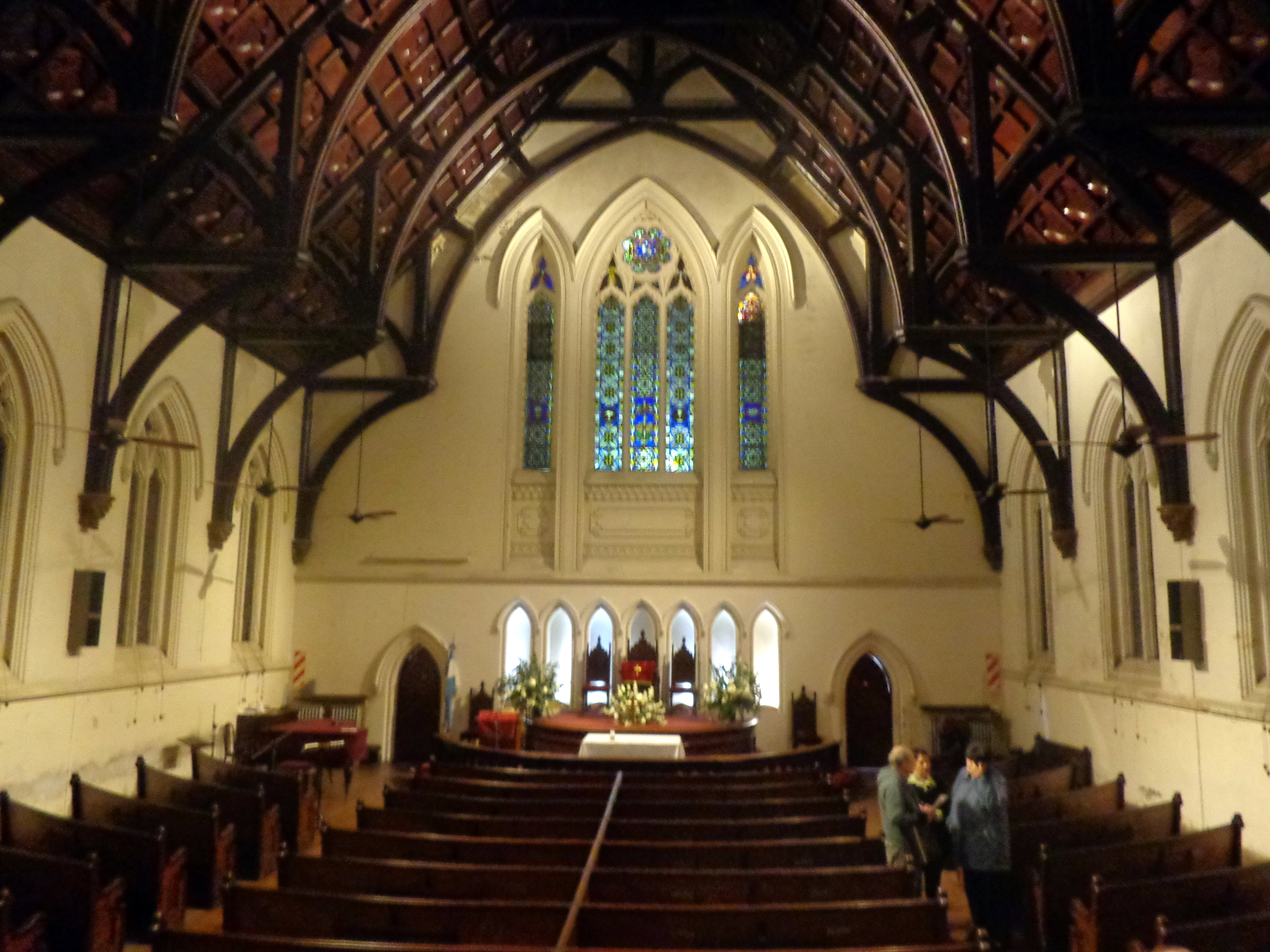
Interior facade of the Argentine Methodist Temple.

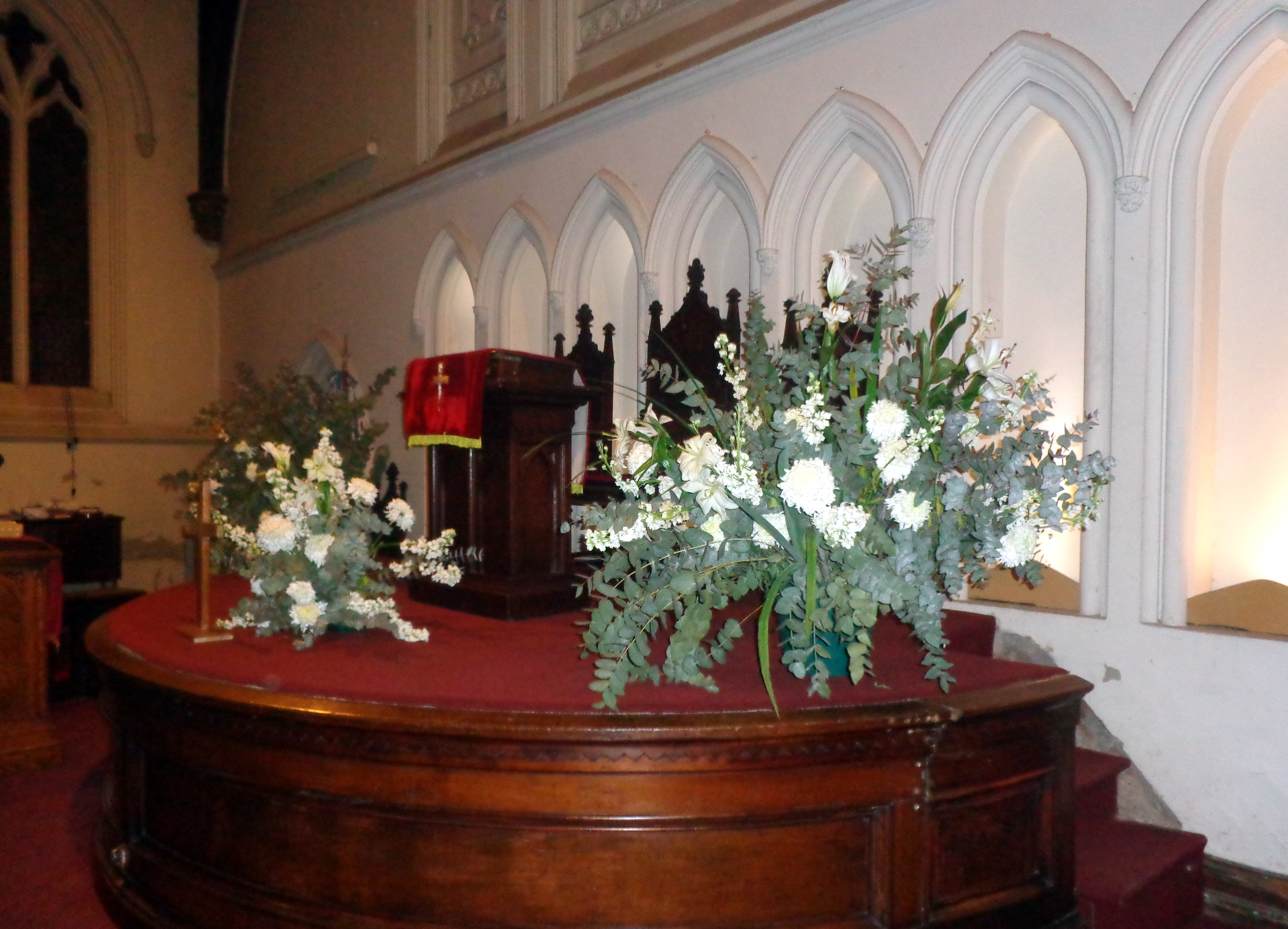
Altar of the Methodist Church

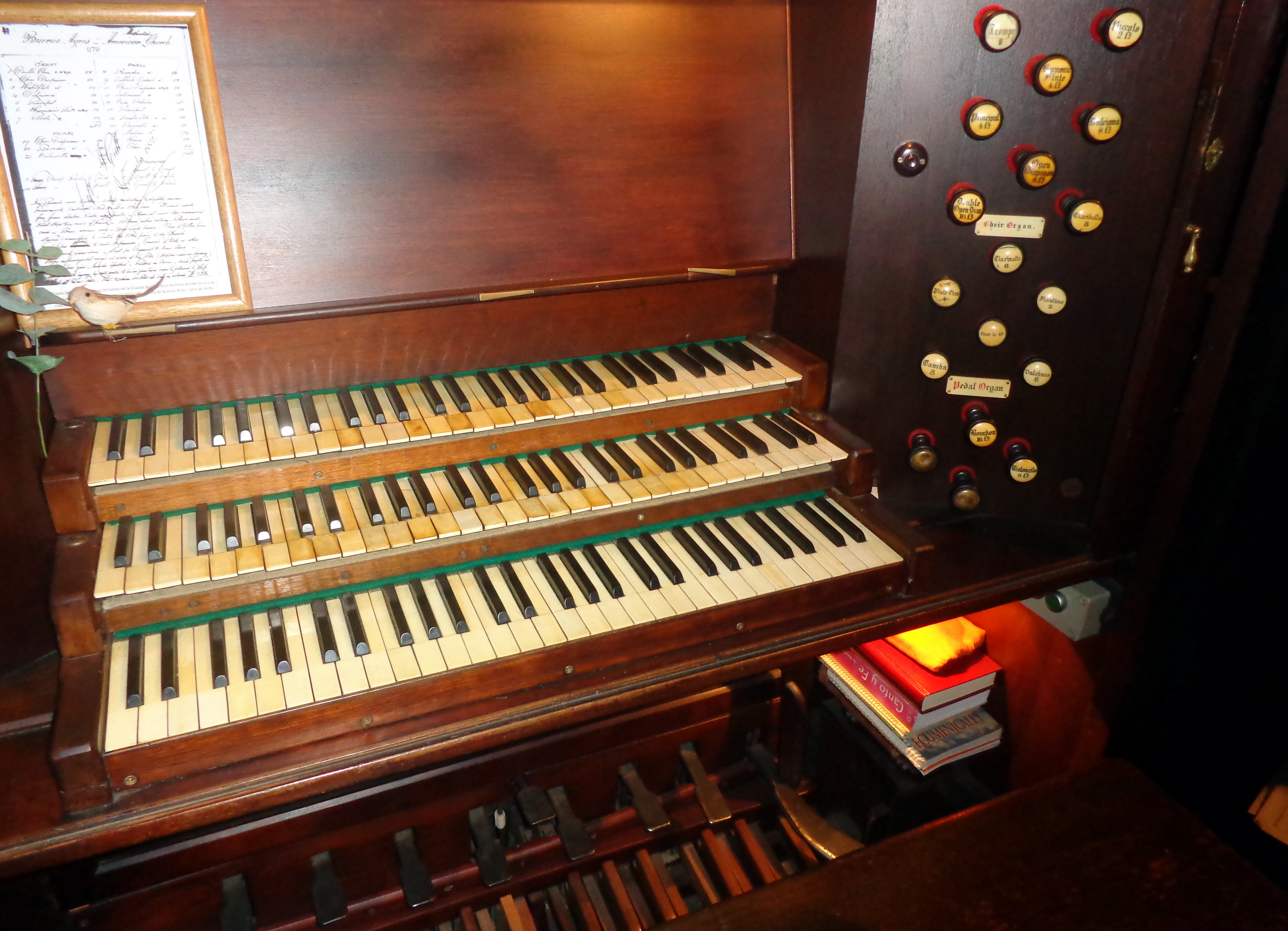
Forster & Andrews organ built in Hule, England.
