= Osmaston, Derbyshire Dales =

Village in Derbyshire, England

Coordinates: 52.99°N 1.70°W

Osmaston
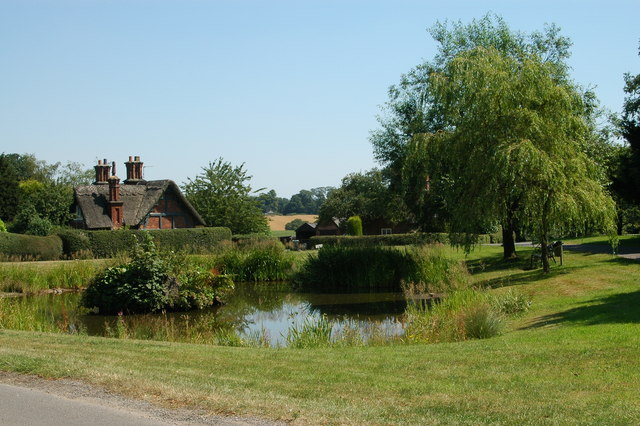
- The village pond

- Location within Derbyshire
- Population: 140 (2011)
- District: Derbyshire Dales
- Shire county: Derbyshire
- Region: East Midlands
- Country: England
- Sovereign state: United Kingdom
- Post town: ASHBOURNE
- Postcode district: DE6
- Dialling code: 01335
- Police: Derbyshire
- Fire: Derbyshire
- Ambulance: East Midlands
- UK Parliament: Derbyshire Dales

Osmaston is a small village and civil parish in the Derbyshire Dales in the county of Derbyshire in England. The population of the civil parish as taken at the 2011 Census was 140.

Located two and a half miles south of Ashbourne, Osmaston is an archetypal English village with thatched cottages and a village pond.

== History ==
The village is mentioned in the Domesday Book of 1086 under the name Osmundestone; the parish was originally named Whitestone.

The village church—St. Martin's—dates from 1606, although the present building was constructed in 1843. The building was previously a wickerwork construction.

== Points of interest ==
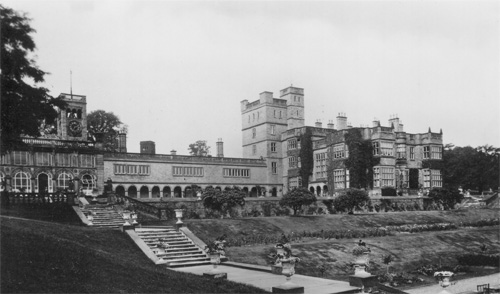
Osmaston Manor south-east view

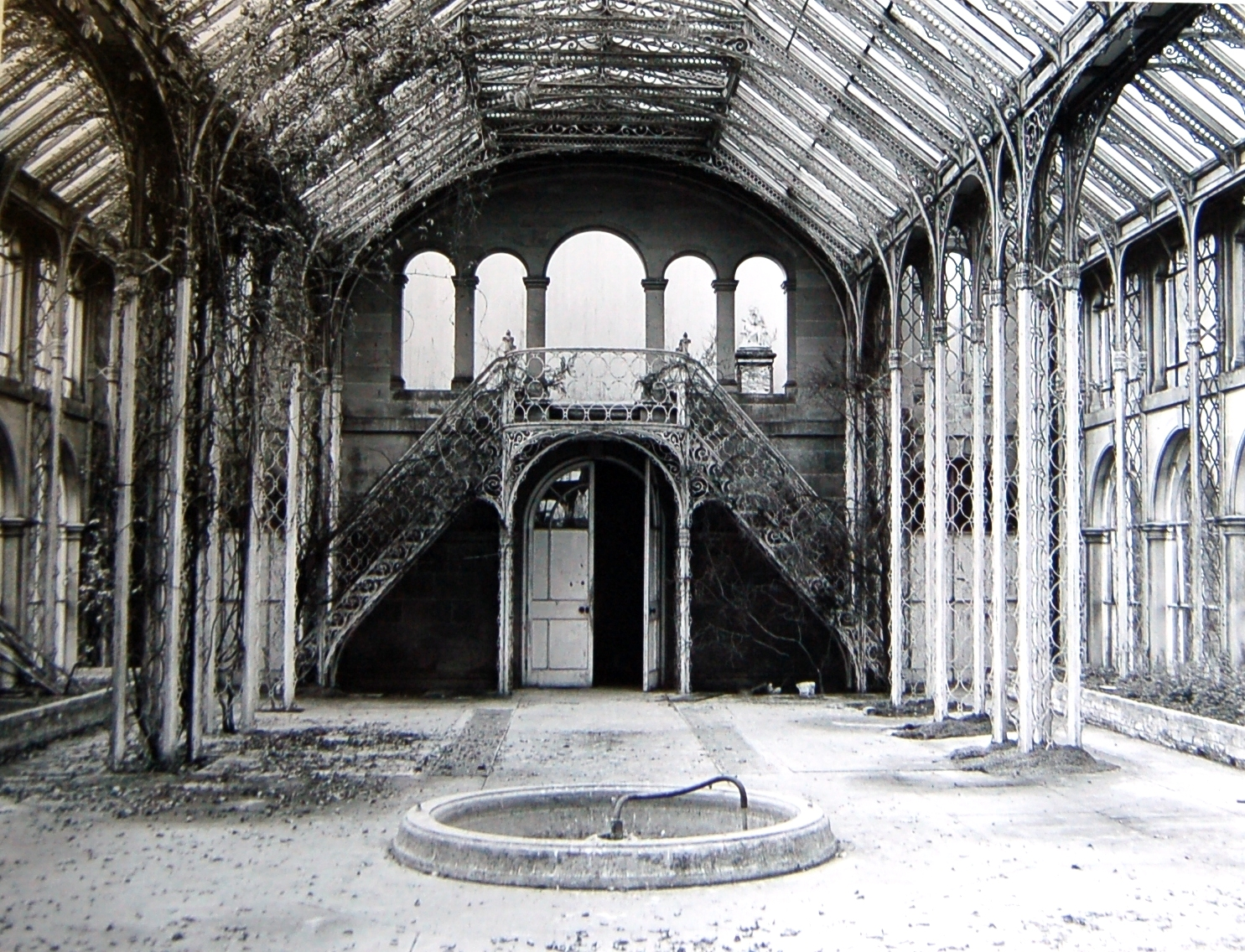
The Winter Garden, Osmaston Manor, just before demolition

The war memorial, by the road near the church, commemorates those lost in the First World War.

The only pub in the village is the Shoulder of Mutton. There is also a village hall and a primary school.

Osmaston Manor was designed by Henry Isaac Stevens for Francis Wright of the Butterley Iron Company and completed in 1849. Many aspects of the Manor's design mirrored Tissington Hall, the home of Wright's wife's family, the FitzHerberts. Upon completion, Wright moved into the house with his family, and lived there until his death in 1873, when it was passed to his eldest son, John. Because of financial difficulties, the estate was sold in 1888 to Sir Andrew Walker's family, who had the house demolished when they moved to Okeover and adopted the Okeover name. The house was used as a Red Cross hospital during World War II, and demolished in 1964. The Walker-Okeover family still own the land; the estate hosts horse trials and the Ashbourne Shire Horse Show. The terraces of the house's gardens are still apparent today.

== See also ==
- Listed buildings in Osmaston, Derbyshire Dales
