= Francis Wright (industrialist) =

British industrialist (1806–1873)

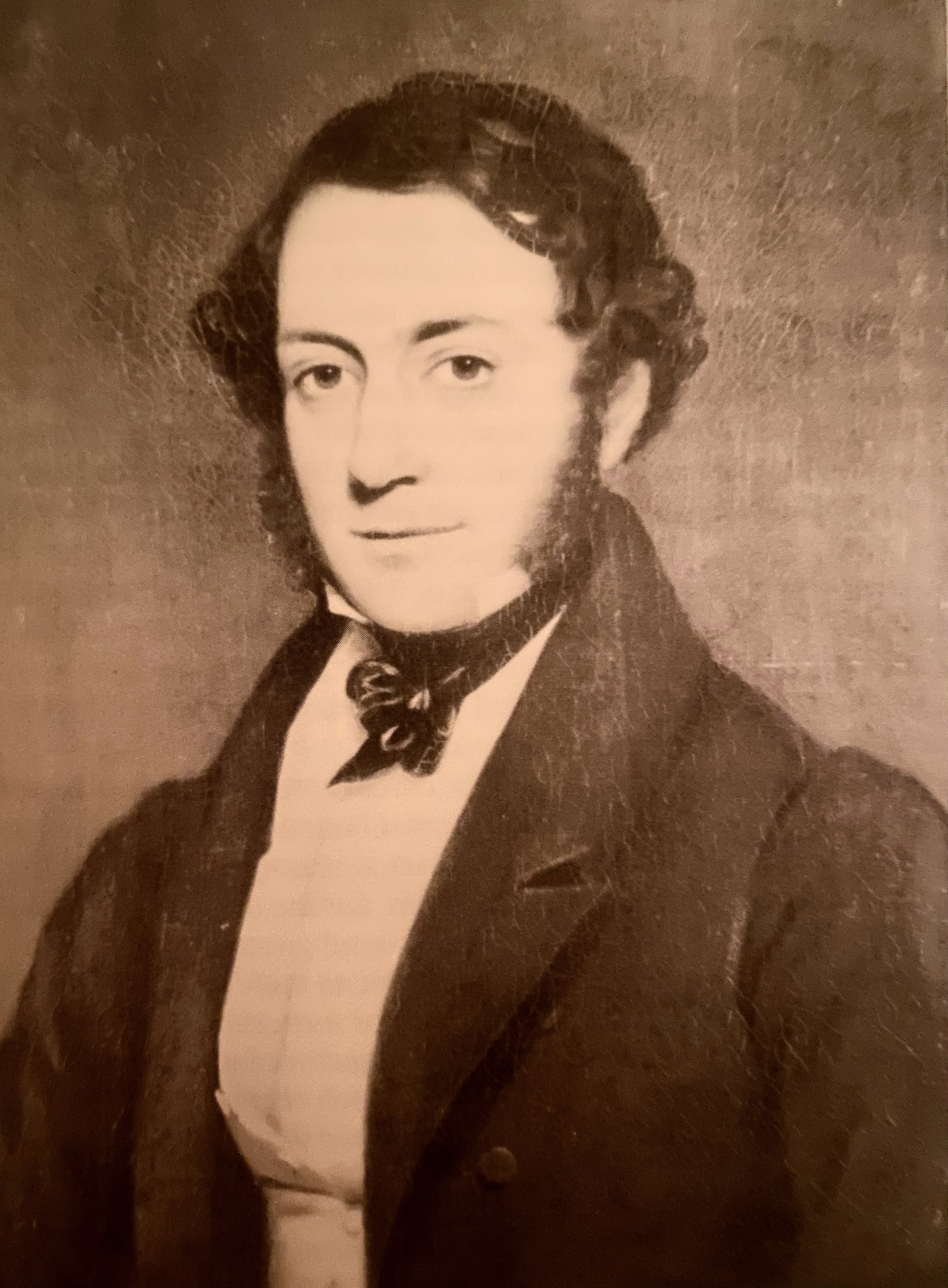
- Born: 21 December 1806; Lenton, Nottinghamshire
- Died: 24 February 1873 (aged 66); Osmaston, Derbyshire Dales
- Spouse: Selina FitzHerbert (m. 1830)
- Children: 12
- Parent(s): John Wright; Elizabeth Beresford

Francis Wright JP DL (21 December 1806 – 24 February 1873), was a British industrialist and philanthropist.

== Early life ==
Wright was born on 21 December 1806, at Lenton Hall, Nottingham, the son of John Wright and Elizabeth Beresford.

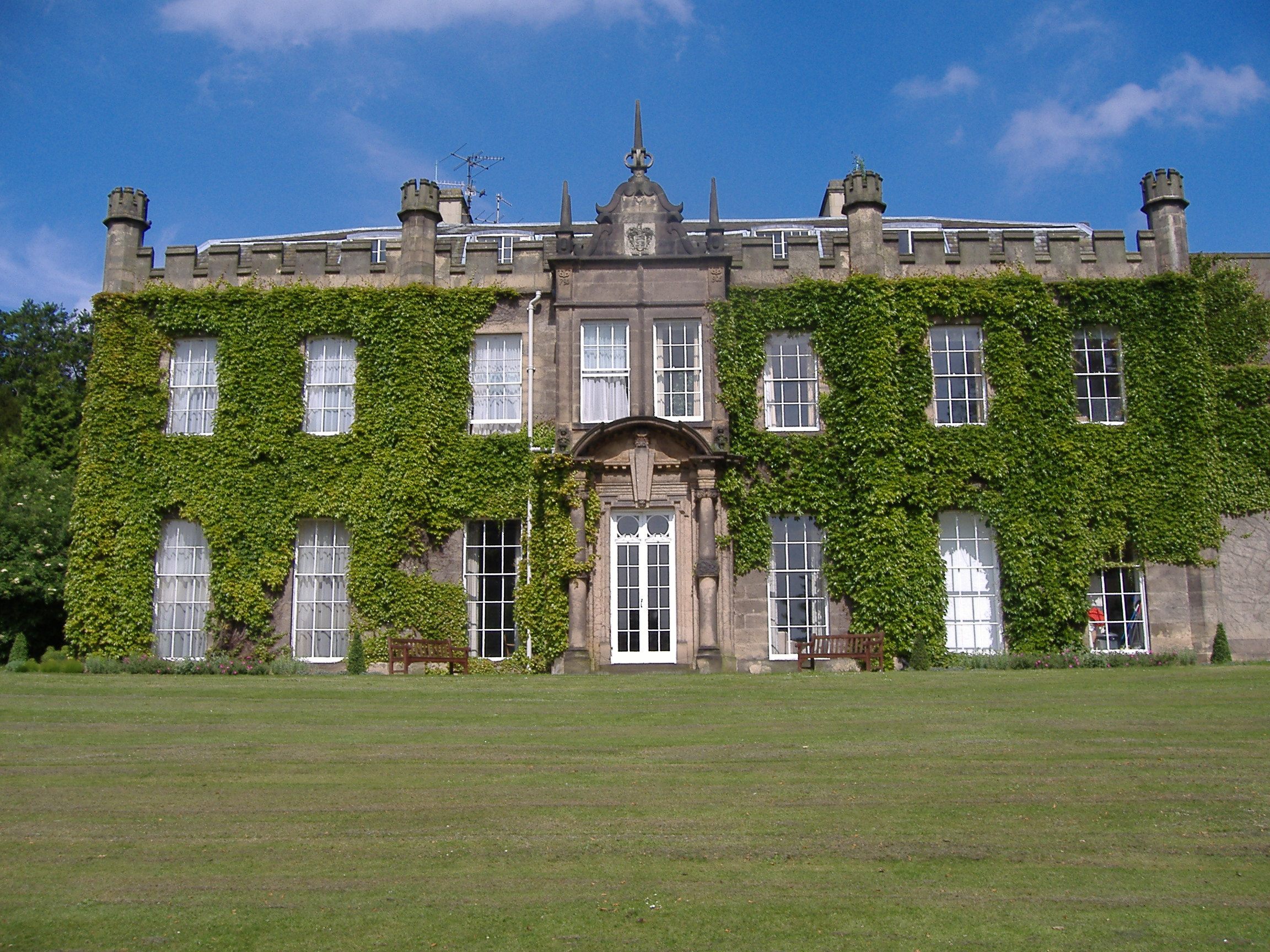
Lenton Hall, Wright's birthplace, now part of the University of Nottingham's Hugh Stewart Hall. Much of the university campus was built on the estate land.

The Wrights were a landed family, first settling in East Anglia and then in Nottinghamshire and, later, Derbyshire. Their line can be traced back to John Wright (alias Camplyon) of Stowupland, who lived in the sixteenth century. Wright's great-grandfather, Ichabod Wright (1700-1777) had set up Wright's bank, in Long Row, Nottingham, which in 1918 became part of Lloyds bank. As the second son, Wright was set to spend life as a banker; however, on the premature death of his elder brother John in Italy in 1828, his father altered his will, making Francis his primary heir.

== Butterley Company ==
In 1792, Wright's father and William Jessop joined Benjamin Outram and Francis Beresford in the establishment of what was to become the Butterley Company at Ripley, in Derbyshire. In 1830, after almost forty years at Butterley, John Wright withdrew from the partnership, and passed his interest to the twenty-four-year-old Francis. Until 1851, Wright worked alongside William Jessop (the younger)—son of the original partner of the same name—and then continued to run Butterley until his death in 1873.

As Francis Wright took over at Butterley, England was emerging into the steam age, and throughout the 1830s, the Wright family had invested in the Midland Counties Railway, although due to its location it was of no use to Butterley. The Company did however build one of the engines used in the maiden run. Butterley made many rails and these were used not only in England, but also abroad, an example being a railway line near to St. Petersburg in Russia. Similar was the situation with structures such as bridges, which were sent to many countries including Holland and India. One of Butterley's last projects under Wright's leadership was the construction of the iron frame of St Pancras railway station.

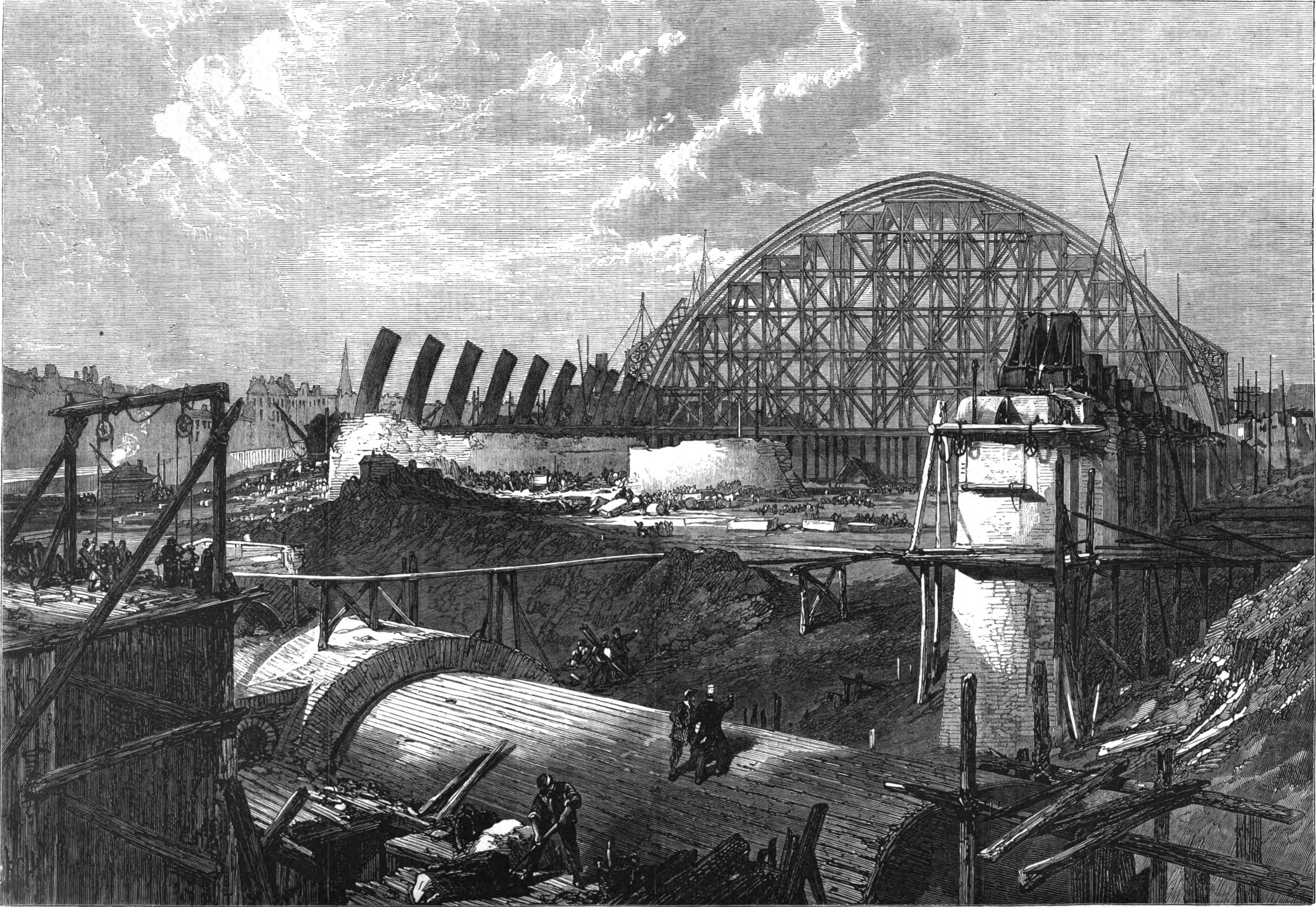
The train shed at St. Pancras under construction in 1868 using Butterley iron

Wright was well-liked by his workers, however he "commanded respect rather than affection". He was most certainly a man of strong morals, banning Ashbourne's annual Shrovetide football match, and his eldest son's coming of age had solemn moments, the toast being completely devoid of alcohol. Also a greatly devout and kind man, the Earl Manvers said of him, "I have always found the name of Mr Wright associated with everything that had to do with promoting Christianity, kindness and good fellowship amongst all." Wright was a very active member of Butterley, and was concerned about the welfare of his workers. Believing that "busy hands keep the devil away", he saw hard work as a way of increasing employee morale. As a Christian, he also saw it as his duty to help others with his great wealth, leading to many philanthropic acts including the construction of the village of Ironville. Ironville was built close to the Butterley hubs of Ripley and Codnor, with many small terraced houses. As well as the accommodation for the Butterley workers, which by that time had amassed more than a thousand, there was a Church, community centre, school and medical facilities. Many of Wright's descendants continued to run Butterley, the last being John Wright, Francis' great-great-grandson. The company (a limited company since 1888) was sold in 1968 to the Wiles Group.

== Osmaston-by-Ashbourne ==
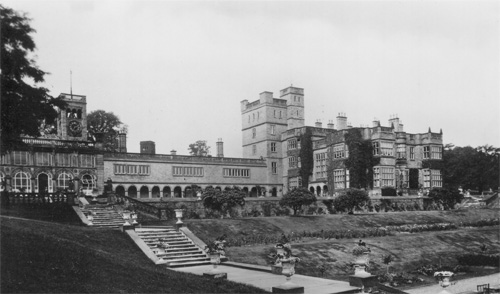
South view of Osmaston Manor

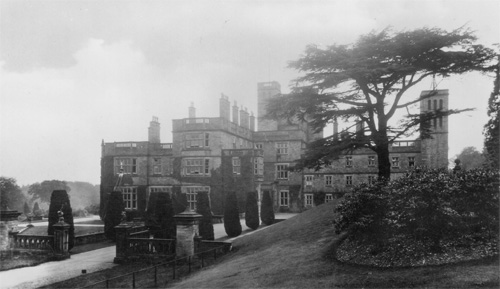
Osmaston Manor east side

On the death of his maternal grandfather, Wright inherited the 3,500-acre (1,400 ha) estate of Osmaston, just south of Ashbourne, Derbyshire, later expanding it to over 5000 acres. In 1845, he embarked on the construction of a 70 roomed neo-Tudor manor, and with it, part of the village of Osmaston. Osmaston Manor was designed by architect Henry Isaac Stevens, who also designed the new village church St Martin's Church, Osmaston. In many aspects, the design for the Manor reflected Tissington Hall, the family home of Wright's wife, and of some of his own ancestors. Considered second only to Chatsworth in splendour, the manor was revolutionary for its time, being built with functioning electricity, and an underground railway to transport coal to hydraulic lifts around the house. After Wright's death, the manor was left to his eldest son, John; however, due to financial difficulties it was sold to Sir Andrew Walker 1st Bt in 1883. As was the case with many houses of the time, the Manor became too big to keep going, especially as the Walker-Okeover family seat had been moved to Okeover Hall, and so in 1965 the Manor was demolished.

Osmaston Manor received many guests during its lifetime, notably Queen Mary's parents the Duke and Duchess of Teck, on a brief visit while travelling in the North, and the Duke and Duchess of Gloucester.

== Trent College ==
At a meeting of the Midland Clerical and Lay Association, of which he was chairman, Wright (an old boy of Rugby School) proposed the founding of a set of schools of Anglican ethos for "boys of the middle class", which would provide a lower-cost option to the public schools. Of these schools however, only Trent was realised. His descendants served on the board of governors for the school until the 1960s. Remaining very involved with Trent until his death, the college chapel was built as his memorial; his hatchment hangs there.

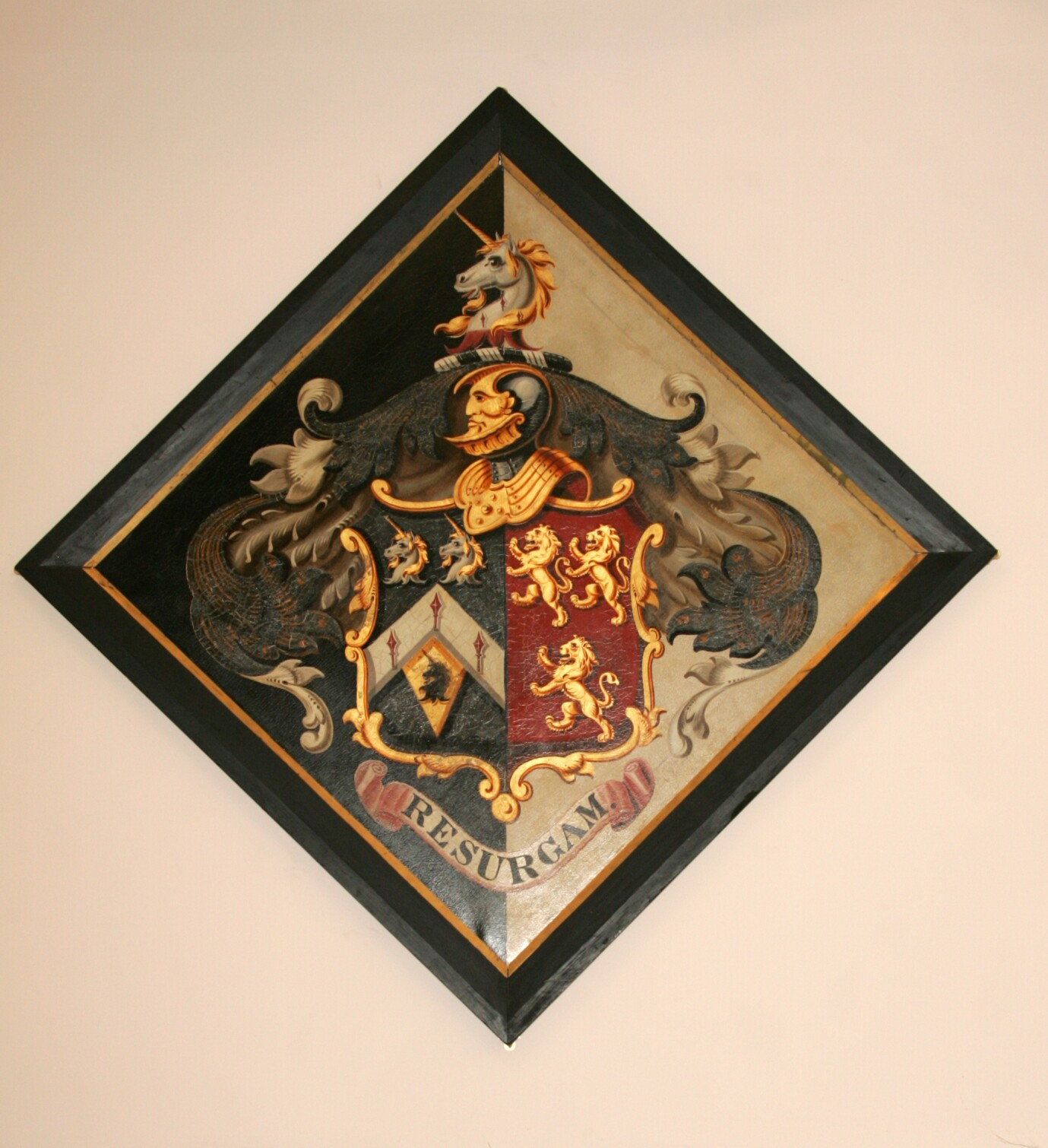
Wright's hatchment, now hanging in the chapel of Trent College.

== Family ==
On 12 August 1830, Wright married his cousin, Selina FitzHerbert, daughter of Sir Henry FitzHerbert 3rd Bt of Tissington Hall, and Agnes Beresford. She was a granddaughter of Sir William FitzHerbert 1st Bt of Tissington Hall, and a great-niece and goddaughter of Alleyne FitzHerbert, Baron St. Helens, envoy to the court of Catherine the Great.

Francis and Selina had 12 children:

- John Wright (1831–1901) Married first. Emily Sophia Plumptre, secondly. Florence Mary Rice. Changed his name to Osmaston in later life. His granddaughter was the suffragist and politician Dorothy Layton.
- The Reverend Henry Wright (1833–1880) Married Lucy Sophia Leslie-Melville, a granddaughter of the Earl of Leven and Melville, and cousin to William Wilberforce and Henry Thornton. This marriage connected the family to members of the former Clapham sect, notable for aiding the abolitionist movement and Christian reform in the late 18th and early 19th centuries. Hon. Clerical Secretary of the Church Missionary Society, later Church Mission Society (1873–1880), Minister of St John's Downshire Hill, Hampstead, Prebendary of St Paul's Cathedral. Had issue.
- Agnes Wright (1833–1909)
- Elizabeth Wright (1835–1909) Married John Bridges Plumptre, rector of Eastwood. Through his maternal grandfather, he was heir to the ancient barony of FitzWalter, which was called out of abeyance for their son, Henry Fitzwalter Plumptre, 20th Baron FitzWalter.
- Selina Wright (1836–1900) Married (Sir) Francis Fox. Her younger sister Mary would later marry his brother Douglas. Parents of Selina FitzHerbert Fox MBE MD BS (1871–1958) founder of the Bermondsey Hospital and medical mission.
- Francis Beresford Wright (1837–1911) Married his first cousin Adeline Frances FitzHerbert. Had issue.
- Frances Wright (1839–1914) Married the Reverend Frederic Edward Wigram, Hon Clerical Secretary of the Church Missionary Society (1882–1895) in succession to his brother-in-law, Henry Wright. A Prebendary of St Paul's Cathedral. Had issue.
- Mary Wright (1840–1920) Married Sir Charles Douglas Fox, brother of Francis Fox. Had issue.
- FitzHerbert Wright (1841–1910) Married Charlotte Rudolphine von Beckmann, daughter of Ernst Christoph Friedrich von Beckmann, Pastor of Holzendorf, Mecklenburg-Schwerin. Their granddaughter Muriel Wright had a war time affair with Ian Fleming, and is widely thought to have been an inspiration for the Bond girls. Among his descendants are Sarah Ferguson and the Earl Cawdor.
- Judith Wright (1842–1903)
- Marcus Beresford Wright (1845–1847)
- Philip Wright (1846–1915) Married Alice Elizabeth Bury, daughter of the Reverend William Bury. Had issue.
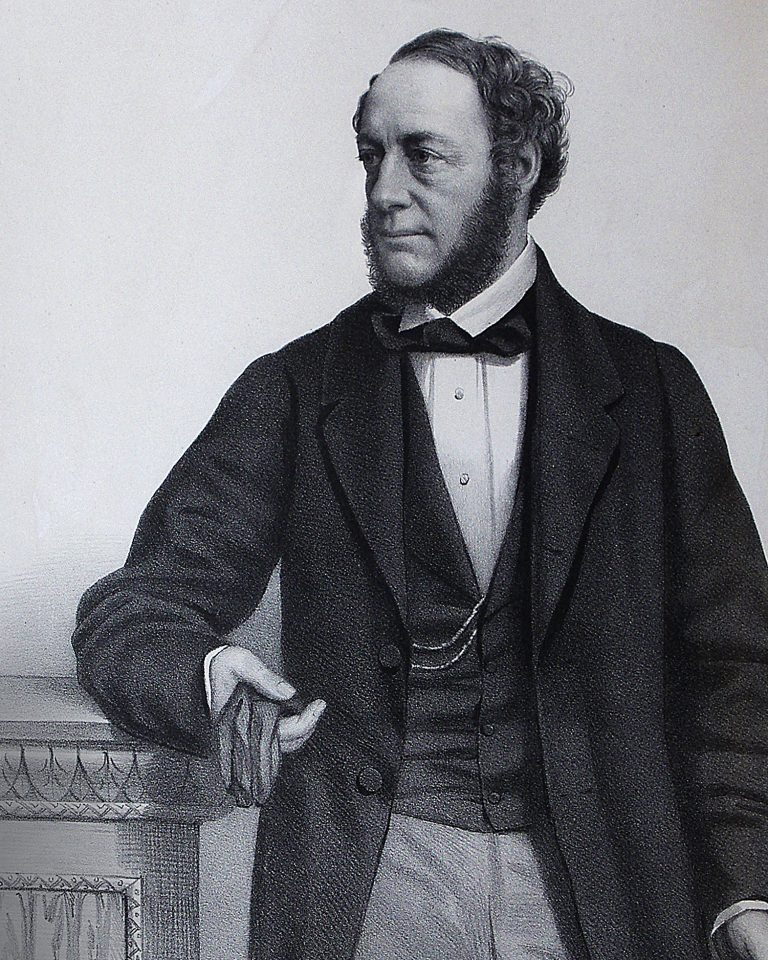
  Wright in later life

== Death and funeral ==
Wright died from bronchitis, aged 66, on 24 February 1873 at Osmaston Manor. The Manor was left to his eldest son John; however, perhaps seeing him unfit for the job, all his interest in the Butterley Company was left to his four remaining sons. His wife and their unmarried daughter Judith moved into the dower house at nearby Yeldersley Hall. Wright's funeral was held in St Martin's Church, Osmaston, on 7 March. After family and friends, over 1200 Butterley workmen and 30 officials followed his funeral cortége to the Church. Francis Wright's Will was proved by his son, John, and cousin, John Martin of Lincoln's Inn, with "effects under £700,000"; it was later resworn in June 1874 "under £1,400,000".
