= Listed buildings in Osmaston, Derbyshire Dales =

Osmaston is a civil parish in the Derbyshire Dales district of Derbyshire, England. The parish contains 21 listed buildings that are recorded in the National Heritage List for England. Of these, one is listed at Grade II*, the middle of the three grades, and the others are at Grade II, the lowest grade. The parish contains the village of Osmaston and the surrounding area. The country house, Osmaston Manor, was built in the 1840s, and has been largely demolished, but its gardens and grounds contain listed buildings, including garden features, cottages and boat houses. The other listed buildings are houses, cottages and associated structures, a church, a school, a war memorial, and a telephone kiosk.

== Key ==
Grade	Criteria
II*	Particularly important buildings of more than special interest
II	Buildings of national importance and special interest

== Buildings ==
Name and location	Photograph	Date	Notes	Grade
Elm Tree Cottage; 52.98961°N 1.70224°W		18th century or earlier	A pair of cottages later combined and converted into a cottage orné in the 1840s. It is in red brick with applied timber framing and stone dressings, and has a thatched and tiled roof. There are two storeys and an L-shaped plan. The east front has a central doorway with a massive bracketed stone hood, and the windows have three lights, those in the upper floor in eyebrow dormers. The south front has a gabled bay on the right with applied timber framing and fretted bargeboards.	II
Copse Hill; 52.98266°N 1.70851°W		Early 19th century	The house is in rendered brick and has a hipped slate roof with a deep overhang and two storeys. On the east front is a two-storey canted bay window, and an open porch that has three segmental-arched doorways with keystones and an impost band. Above is a broad window with a segmental arch and Gothic glazing. The south front contains casement windows with flat arches.	II
St Martin's Church; 52.99308°N 1.70426°W		1843–45	The church, which was designed by H. I. Stevens in Decorated style, is built in small stones with sandstone dressings and has a Welsh slate roof. It consists of a nave with a clerestory, north and south aisle, a south porch, a chancel with an octagonal north vestry and a west tower. The tower has three stages, angle buttresses rising to crocketed pinnacles, chamfered string courses, a polygonal stair turret with an octagonal, gableted, top with a crocketed pinnacle, and a west doorway with a three-light window and a hood mould above. Over this are lancet windows, a clock face on the south side, pairs of two-light bell openings, and a traceried parapet.	II*
Osmaston Primary School and house 52.99256°N 1.70490°W		1845	The school and attached house were designed by H. I. Stevens, they are in limestone with sandstone dressings, and have a Welsh slate roof with coped gables, moulded kneelers, and finials. The building is in one and two storeys and has an irregular plan. The house to the right has two storeys, a gabled bay on the front containing a canted bay window, and a two-light mullioned window above. To the left is a doorway with a gabled dormer above. The school has a gabled bay flanked by mullioned windows, over which is an inscribed plaque, and at the rear is a twin gabled extension.	II
Dam and Waterwheel, Osmaston Park; 52.97732°N 1.69596°W		Late 1840s	The dam and waterwheel at the south end of the lake were designed by H. I. Stevens. The dam is in limestone with a curved plan, and has a footpath on the top and stone steps with iron railings. The overshot waterwheel is attached to a wooden hut with a roof of corrugated iron and stone slate.	II
Osmaston Park Cottage; 52.98508°N 1.69178°W		Late 1840s	A cottage orné in red brick, partly rendered, with a roof partly thatched and partly tiled. There are two storeys, an irregular plan, and a south front of three bays. The middle bay projects and contains a large canted bay window with Gothic glazing, and a projecting canopy. The other window are casements with segmental heads, those in the upper floor in eyebrow dormers. At the rear is a plainer T-shaped range.	II
Large Boat House, Osmaston Park; 52.97907°N 1.69899°W	—	Late 1840s	The boat house on the lake is in limestone with sandstone dressings. It consists of a brick tunnel vault, the entrance from the lake having a round arch with a keystone on semicircular cutwaters. It has curved side walls with end piers, and a coped parapet forming a footbridge. On the land side are twin flights of stone steps leading to a round-arched doorway with a parapet wall above.	II
Small Boat House, Osmaston Park; 52.98107°N 1.69544°W	—	Late 1840s	The boat house consists of a brick tunnel vault with sandstone dressings. The lake side has a round-arched entrance with raised square outer moulding rising from projecting impost blocks. From the land side, steps lead down to a simple round-arched doorway.	II
Terracing, steps, balustrades and footbridge, Osmaston Manor Gardens; 52.98169°N 1.69972°W		Late 1840s	The gardens of the demolished Osmaston Manor contain balustrades, terraces linked by steps, piers with obelisks, and a balustraded tower-like projection. There is a footbridge consisting of a broad segmental arch, with voussoirs, impost blocks and a keystone. In the lower terrace is a stylised quatrefoil pond.	II
Tower and kitchen garden walls, Osmaston Manor Gardens; 52.98270°N 1.70147°W		Late 1840s	The walls and the tower were designed by H. I. Stevens. The kitchen gardens have two enclosures, each divided by a cross wall, with walls in red brick with stone copings and limestone piers with bracketed caps. Inside are lean-to sheds, and along the south walls are the remains of lean-to glass houses. The stone-faced square tower in the centre, which acted as a chimney, has external steps leading to a round-arched entrance. Above are slit windows and a moulded string course, and at the top is a three-bay Italianate open arcade on each face, with a similar decorative blind arcade below. Over this is another string course and a parapet.	II
Stone Cottages; 52.99136°N 1.70405°W	—	Late 1840s	A row of three cottages designed by H. I. Stevens in limestone with sandstone dressings and a tile roof. There is a single storey and attics, and a front of four bays, the middle two bays projecting and gabled, and containing mullioned windows. The outer bays have smaller gables and similar windows.	II
Stables, Home Farm; 52.98521°N 1.69375°W		c. 1849	The stable range is in red brick with a dentilled eaves band, and a tile roof with coped gables and moulded kneelers. The central block has two storeys, and a hipped roof with a wooden gabled pigeoncote, and a gableted brick turret with a weathervane. The block and the flanking wings, which have a single storey, contain doorways and windows with basket-arched heads.	II
Laundry Cottage; 52.98637°N 1.69510°W	—	c. 1849	The cottage, designed by H. I. Stevens in Swiss chalet style, is in limestone with sandstone dressings, a floor band, and a stone slate roof with overhanging eaves on elongated brackets. There are two storeys and a T-shaped plan, and a front of three bays, the middle bay projecting. The windows are mullioned, and in the south front is a doorway with a Tudor arch.	II
North Lodge and gateway, Osmaston Park; 52.98876°N 1.70144°W		c. 1849	The lodge, designed by H. I. Stevens in Tudor style, is in limestone with sandstone dressings, a floor band, and a Welsh slate roof with bracketed overhanging eaves. There are two storeys, and an unequal cruciform plan. The west front has three bays, the middle bay projecting and gabled. The doorway to the left has a stepped and chamfered surround, and most of the windows are mullioned. The gateway attached to the northwest has four tall limestone piers with moulded tops and ball finials, and there are six subsidiary piers in sandstone, linked by a stone balustrade with round arches.	II
Park View Cottage; 52.98949°N 1.70172°W		Mid-19th century	The cottage is in red brick with a thatched roof. There are two storeys and two bays, and a single-storey bay to the left. On the front is a gabled porch, the windows are casements with flat heads, and above the porch are initials in burnt headers.	II
Eastside Cottages; 52.99040°N 1.70330°W		c. 1870	A terrace of four red brick houses with yellow brick dressings, an eaves band, and a Welsh slate roof. There are two storeys and a symmetrical front of five bays. In the centre is a projecting Tudor arch with a bracketed gabled hood, and above it is a small dormer with a pyramidal roof. The flanking bays contain three-light windows with gabled dormers above. The outer bays are gabled, and each contains a canted bay window with a hipped roof, above which is a three-light window.	II
Outbuilding northeast of Eastside Cottages; 52.99047°N 1.70314°W	—	c. 1870	The outbuilding, containing a wash house, a coal house and a pig sty, is in red brick with a tile roof. There is a single storey, and a T-shaped plan. On the west front are two doorways and a window, all with segmental heads, and a window with a flat head. At the rear are two pig sties with coped walls, and two loft entrances.	II
Outbuilding south of Eastside Cottages; 52.99037°N 1.70311°W	—	c. 1870	The outbuilding, containing a wash house, a coal house and a pig sty, is in red brick with a tile roof. There is a single storey, and a T-shaped plan. On the west front are a window and two doorways, all with segmental heads and chamfered surrounds. At the rear are two pig sties with coped walls, and two loft entrances.	II
Stud House; 52.98310°N 1.70364°W	—	1897	The house, designed by Alexander MacPherson, has stone dressings, a tile roof, two storeys, and a north front of three bays. The ground floor is in brick, and contains mullioned and transomed windows, and a porch on wooden posts with curved spandrels. The middle bay of the upper floor has applied close studded timber framing, it contains a canted oriel window, and above it is a jettied timber framed gable. The outer bays have tile hanging, and contain casement windows.	II
War memorial 52.99288°N 1.70467°W		1921	The plinth of the war memorial is set in the churchyard wall of St Martin's Church. It was designed by Walter Shirley, 11th Earl Ferrers, and is in sandstone. It has a rectangular plan, and three tapering stages. The bottom stage is inscribed with the names of those lost in the First World War, and the middle stage is plain. The top stage has a cross in relief on the west face, blind recessed lancets on the north and south faces, and a cruciform gableted top.	II
Telephone kiosk 52.99064°N 1.70365°W		1935	The K6 type telephone kiosk was designed by Giles Gilbert Scott. Constructed in cast iron with a square plan and a dome, it has three unperforated crowns in the top panels.	II
