= Holy Trinity Church, Ashby-de-la-Zouch =

Holy Trinity, Ashby-de-la-Zouch
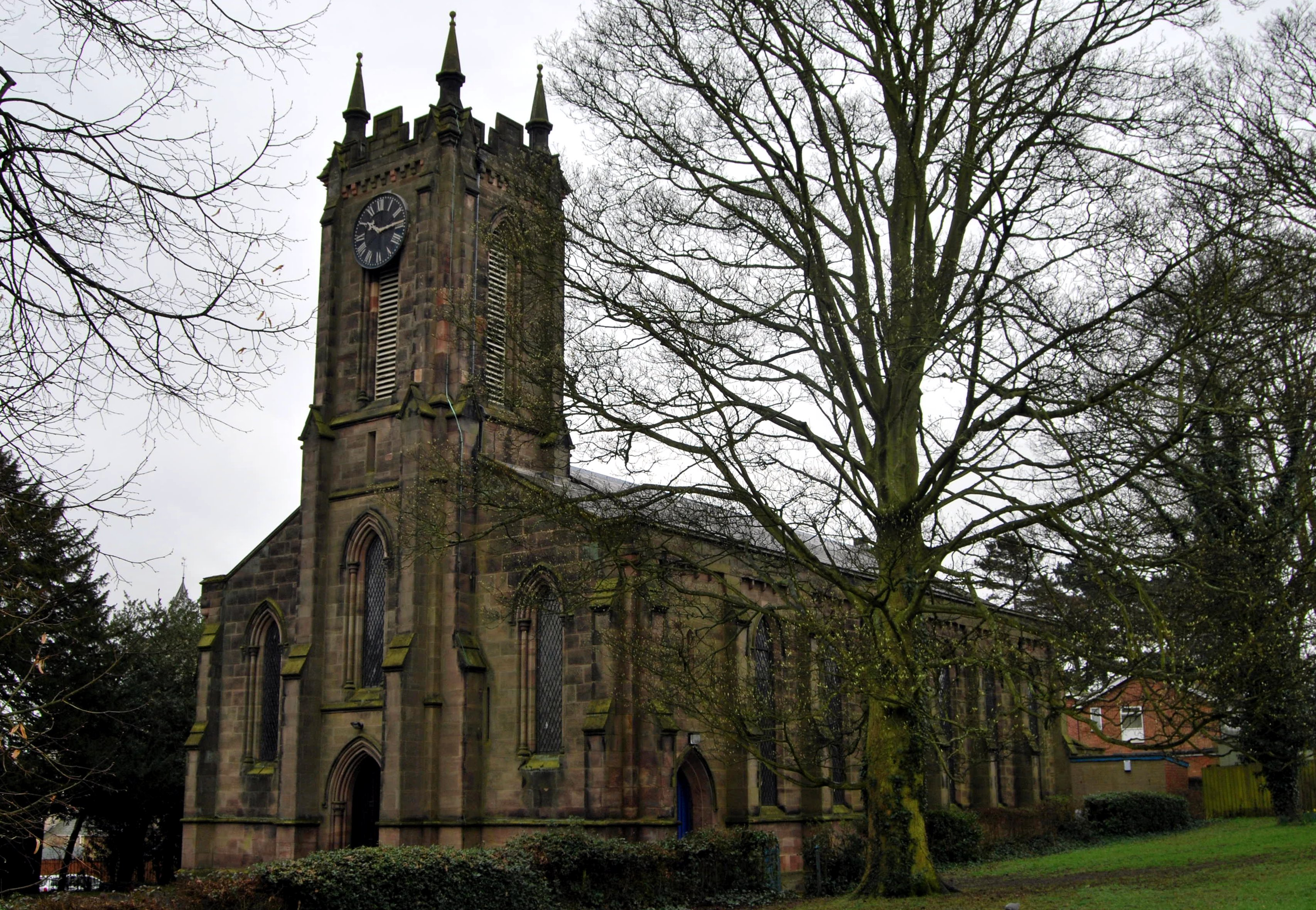
- Holy Trinity, Ashby-de-la-Zouch
- 52.745743°N 1.475648°W
- OS grid reference: SK 35494 16586
- Country: England
- Denomination: Church of England
- Churchmanship: Evangelical
- Website: trinityashby.net

History
- Dedication: Holy Trinity

Architecture
- Heritage designation: Grade II listed building
- Architect: Henry Isaac Stevens
- Architectural type: Gothic Revival
- Groundbreaking: 1838
- Completed: 1840

Administration
- Province: Canterbury
- Diocese: Diocese of Leicester
- Archdeaconry: Loughborough
- Parish: Ashby-de-la-Zouch

Clergy
- Vicar: Tim Phillips

Holy Trinity, Ashby-de-la-Zouch, is a parish church in the Church of England Diocese of Leicester in Ashby-de-la-Zouch, Leicestershire.

== Description ==
The church was built between 1838 and 1840 to designs by the Derby architect, Henry Isaac Stevens. The chancel was added in 1866 by James Piers St Aubyn.

The church was consecrated by George Davys, Bishop of Peterborough on 13 August 1840. It was reported that:

The Marquess of Hastings gave land for the site. The cost of the building, upwards of 3000l., together with a handsome sum towards an endowment fund, was raised by subscription, chiefly among the inhabitants aided by a grant from the Church Building Society. The church contains upwards of 900 sittings, 600 of which are free and unappropriated.

== Ministry ==
It is part of the Ashby and Breedon Team Ministry which comprises the following churches:

- St Mary the Virgin, Coleorton
- St John's Chapel, Coleorton
- St Matthew's Church, Worthington
- St Helen's Church, Ashby-de-la-Zouch
- The Priory Church of Saint Mary and Saint Hardulph, Breedon on the Hill
- All Saints' Church, Isley Walton

== Organ ==
The church contains a 2 manual pipe organ by Brindley & Foster. It appears to date from around 1867 shortly after the chancel was built. A specification of the organ can be found on the British Institute of Organ Studies National Pipe Organ Register at N04546.
