= Derek W. Jones =

British-born Canadian academic (1933–2024)

- Born: December 9, 1933; Water Orton, Warwickshire, England
- Died: February 15, 2024 (aged 90); Halifax, Nova Scotia, Canada
- Occupations: Academic, research scientist
- Known for: International research in dental materials science, International and Canadian Dental Standards, mercury in amalgam

Derek William Jones (December 9, 1933 – February 15, 2024) was a British-born Canadian academic who was Professor Emeritus of Applied Oral Science and Biomaterials at Dalhousie University in Halifax, Nova Scotia, Canada.

== Early life and education ==
Jones was born in the village of Water Orton, in the Midlands of England. He obtained a B.Sc. and Ph.D. from the University of Birmingham, United Kingdom.

== Career ==
Jones emigrated to Canada and joined Dalhousie's Faculty of Dentistry in 1975, serving as Head of the Biomaterials Science Division, Chairman of the Department of Applied Oral Sciences and Associate Dean of Research during his tenure.

Jones conducted research into biomaterials and materials, including ceramics, hard and soft polymers, composites, dental cement, bone cement, mercury pollution, biocompatibility of materials and synthesis of glass and polymer materials, as well as the release of drugs from biomaterials. He has authored and co-authored over 300 papers and abstracts and contributed chapters and sections on biomaterials in eight books, and his research has resulted in two patents. He has contributed to dental materials standardization, both in Canada and internationally, since 1971. Serving as Secretary of ISO/TC/106/SC1 for 19 years, Chair ISO/TC 106/SC1 for 8 years and as International Chair of the full ISO TC 106 committee for nine years. Serving as Chair of the International Organization for Standardization (ISO)) Technical Committee 106 - Dentistry from 2005 to 2014. His area of expertise is dental materials. He is a Chartered Chemist (C. Chem) and a Fellow of the Royal Society of Chemists (FRSC), the Institute of Ceramics (F.I.Ceram), Institute of Materials (FIM) and Biomaterials Science and Engineering (FBSE).

Jones was a past president of the Canadian Association for Dental Research, the Dental Materials Group, of the International Association for Dental Research, and served as Chair of the Canadian Dental Association Dental Materials and Devices Committee, the Canadian Dental Association Technical Committee on Dentistry and the Canadian Advisory Committee to the International Organization for Standardization. Jones was awarded the International Wilmer Souder Distinguished Scientist Award by the International Association for Dental Research in 1988.

Jones's career at Dalhousie and his international honour from the FDI in 2016 were featured in a news article published by the university in 2017.

Jones died in Halifax, Nova Scotia on 15 February 2024, at the age of 90.

== Awards and honors ==
Jones also received the following awards in recognition of his work:

- Honorary Member of Canadian Academy of Restorative Dentistry and Prosthodontics, 1987
- Wilmer Souder Award, International Association for Dental Research (IADR), 1988. This award is made on the basis of scientific achievement of outstanding quality which has advanced or may reasonably be expected to significantly advance dental service to the public. It is intended to confer the highest honour in the field of dental materials research upon those scientists who, through research in this field, bring about outstanding advances in dental health.
- Award of Merit, Canadian Dental Association, 1991
- Honorary Doctorate Degree from Umeå University in Sweden in 1992.
- International Fellowship, Biomaterials Science and Engineering, 1996
- Distinguished Service Award, Canadian Dental Association, 1996
- Honorary member of the Association of Prosthodontists Canada, 2001
- Award of Merit, Canadian Standards Association, 2002
- Honorary Fellow, International College of Dentists, 2005
- Distinguished Service Award of the International Association for Dental Research (IADR), 2016
- World Dental Federation’s (FDI) highest award – elected as a Member of the List of Honour, 2016

== Selected publications ==
- Jones, Derek W. "Oral Health: getting your teeth into dental standards". ISO.
- Jones, Derek W. (2012). "Dental Standards - fifty years of development". British Dental Journal. 213 (6): 293–5. doi:10.1038/sj.bdj.2012.835. PMID 22996480.

°Derek. W. Jones and H.J. Wilson, "Some Properties of Dental Ceramics", J Oral Rehab., 2:379,1975.

°C.G. Plant and Derek W. Jones "The Damaging Effect of Restorative Materials II: Pulpal Effects Related to Physical and Chemical Properties", Brit.Dent.J., 140:406, 1976

°Derek W. Jones, et al. "Survey of Mercury Vapour in Dental Offices in Atlantic Canada" J.Can.Dent. Assoc., 49:378, 1983.

°Derek W. Jones, et al. "Chemical Composition of Glass Synthesized from Aqueous Alkaline Solutions", J.Can.Ceram.Soc., 55:42-49, 1986.

°Derek W. Jones and E.J. Sutow, "Stress Corrosion Failure of Dental Porcelain", Brit.Ceram.Soc.Trans.&J., 86:40-43, 1987.

°Derek W. Jones, et al. "Fracture Toughness and Dynamic Modulus of a Tetrasilicic-Micaglass-Ceramic (K2O-MgF2-MgO-SiO2)", J.Can.Ceram.Soc.57:39-46, 1988.

°Derek W. Jones, and A. S. Rizkalla, "Characterization of Experimental Composite Biomaterials." Journal of Biomedical Materials, 33: 89-100, 1996.

°Derek W. Jones "International Dental Standards." JCDA Journal, 73, 10, 882-883, 2008.
