= Thomas Watson (cricketer, born 1880) =

English cricketer and clergyman

Thomas Herman Watson (14 November 1880 – 15 February 1944) was an English clergyman and a cricketer who played first-class cricket in one match for Cambridge University in 1903 and in two matches for Warwickshire in 1904. He was born at Water Orton, Warwickshire and died at Singleton, Lancashire.

Watson was the fifth son of the vicar of Water Orton and was educated at St Bees School and at Pembroke College, Cambridge. As a cricketer, he was a right-handed tail-end batsman and a right-arm fast-medium bowler. He had no success in any of his three games of first-class cricket, failing to take a single wicket.

Although he matriculated in 1900, Watson did not graduate with a Bachelor of Arts degree from Cambridge University until 1910; he then took until 1921 to convert this to a Master of Arts. He was ordained as a Church of England priest and from 1912 to 1913 he served as the curate at All Saints' Church in Blackpool. Following service in the First World War in the Royal Army Chaplains' Department, he returned to The Fylde area as the vicar of Great Singleton from 1919, and was there up to his death in 1944.
