= St Martin's Church, Osmaston =

St Martin’s Church, Osmaston
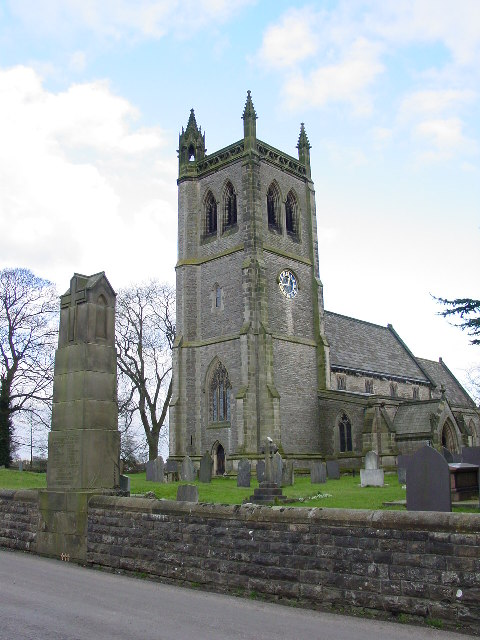
- St Martin’s Church, Osmaston
- St Martin’s Church, Osmaston
- 52°59′34.67″N 1°42′17.92″W
- OS grid reference: SK 19947 44011
- Location: Osmaston, Derbyshire Dales
- Country: England
- Denomination: Church of England

History
- Dedication: St Martin
- Consecrated: 23 June 1845

Architecture
- Heritage designation: Grade II* listed
- Architect: Henry Isaac Stevens
- Groundbreaking: 8 June 1843
- Completed: 23 June 1845

Specifications
- Length: 94 feet (29 m)
- Width: 45.2 feet (13.8 m)
- Height: 69 feet (21 m)

Administration
- Province: Canterbury
- Diocese: Derby
- Archdeaconry: Derby
- Deanery: Ashbourne
- Parish: Osmaston

St Martin's Church, Osmaston is a Grade II* listed parish church in the Church of England in Osmaston, Derbyshire Dales.

== History ==
The original church may have dated from 1606. The first stone of the new church was laid on 8 June 1843. and it was designed by Henry Isaac Stevens of Derby. It consists of a nave, aisles, chancel, west tower, south porch and vestry. The external stone for the walls is limestone from land owned by Henry FitzHerbert, 3rd Baronet of Tissington, and other stone from the quarries at Stanton near Ashbourne was used for the windows, doors, buttresses, and moulded and ornamental portions. The builder was William Evans of Ellastone, Ashbourne.

The £9,000 (equivalent to £946,100 in 2025) cost of rebuilding plus the attached school-rooms was funded by Francis Wright of Lenton, Nottingham, and the church was consecrated by the Bishop of Lichfield, Rt. Revd. John Lonsdale on 23 June 1845.

== War memorial ==
The churchyard contains a Grade II listed war memorial of 1921 by Walter Shirley, 11th Earl Ferrers.

== Parish status ==
The church is in a joint parish with

- All Saints' Church, Brailsford
- St James' Church, Edlaston
- St Michael's Church, Shirley
- Holy Trinity Church, Yeaveley

== Organ ==
The church contains a pipe organ which was obtained in 2000 from the United Reformed Church, Ashbourne. It was installed within the casework of the previous Brindley & Foster organ. A specification of the current organ can be found on the National Pipe Organ Register.

== Bells ==
The church tower contains a peal of 6 bells, 5 of them dating from 1845 by Charles and George Mears. The treble dates from 1914 and was cast by Mears and Stainbank.

== See also ==
- Grade II* listed buildings in Derbyshire Dales
- Listed buildings in Osmaston, Derbyshire Dales
