= St John the Evangelist's Church, Truro =

Church in Cornwall, England

Coordinates: 50°15′36.36″N 5°03′13.32″W

St John the Evangelist’s Church, Truro
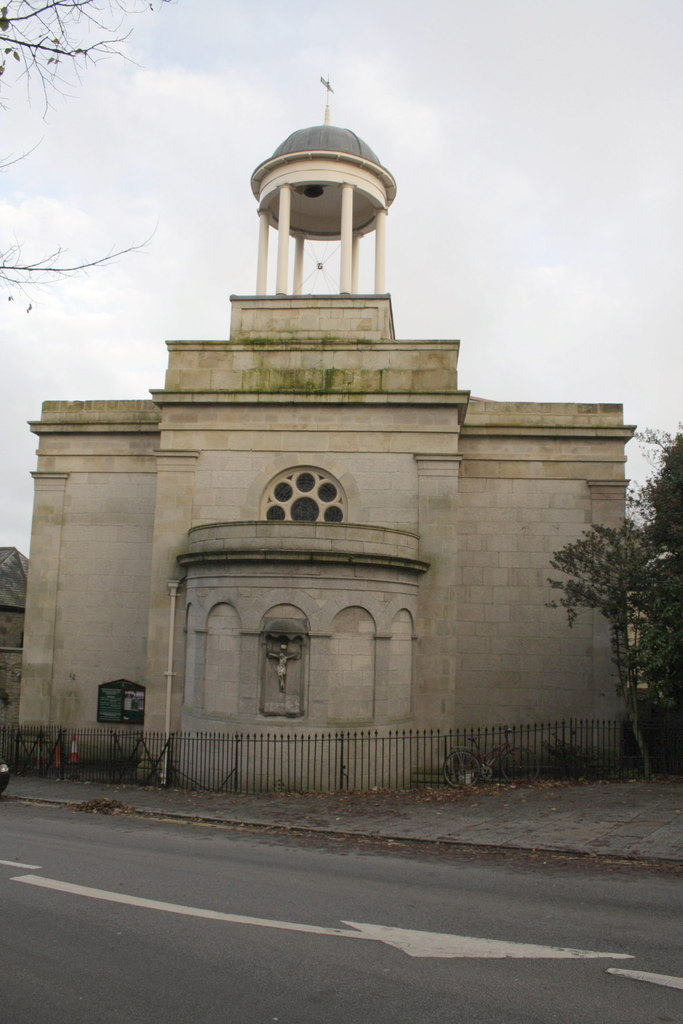
- St John the Evangelist’s Church, Truro
- St John the Evangelist’s Church, Truro
- Location: Truro
- Country: England
- Denomination: Church of England
- Churchmanship: Anglo-Catholic

History
- Dedication: St John the Evangelist

Architecture
- Heritage designation: Grade II listed
- Architect: Philip Sambell
- Completed: 1828

Administration
- Province: Province of Canterbury
- Diocese: Diocese of Truro
- Parish: St John Truro

St John the Evangelist's Church, Truro is a Grade II listed parish church in the Church of England in Truro, Cornwall.

== History ==
The church was built in 1828 to the designs of the architect Philip Sambell of Devonport. It was modified in 1860 by William Henry Reid of Plymouth

Extensive alterations were carried out by James Arthur Reeve of Exeter in 1884. The ceiling of carved wood replaced the plaster ceiling. A new organ was introduced. Stained glass windows by Heaton, Butler and Bayne were inserted. The church reopened on 12 October 1884.

There were more changes in 1892.

== Organ ==
The church contains an organ by Forster and Andrews dating from 1884 which was purchased at a cost of £344 (equivalent to £36,959 in 2025). It was enlarged by Heard and Son of Truro in 1895. A specification of the organ can be found on the National Pipe Organ Register.
