= Congregational Chapel, Derby =

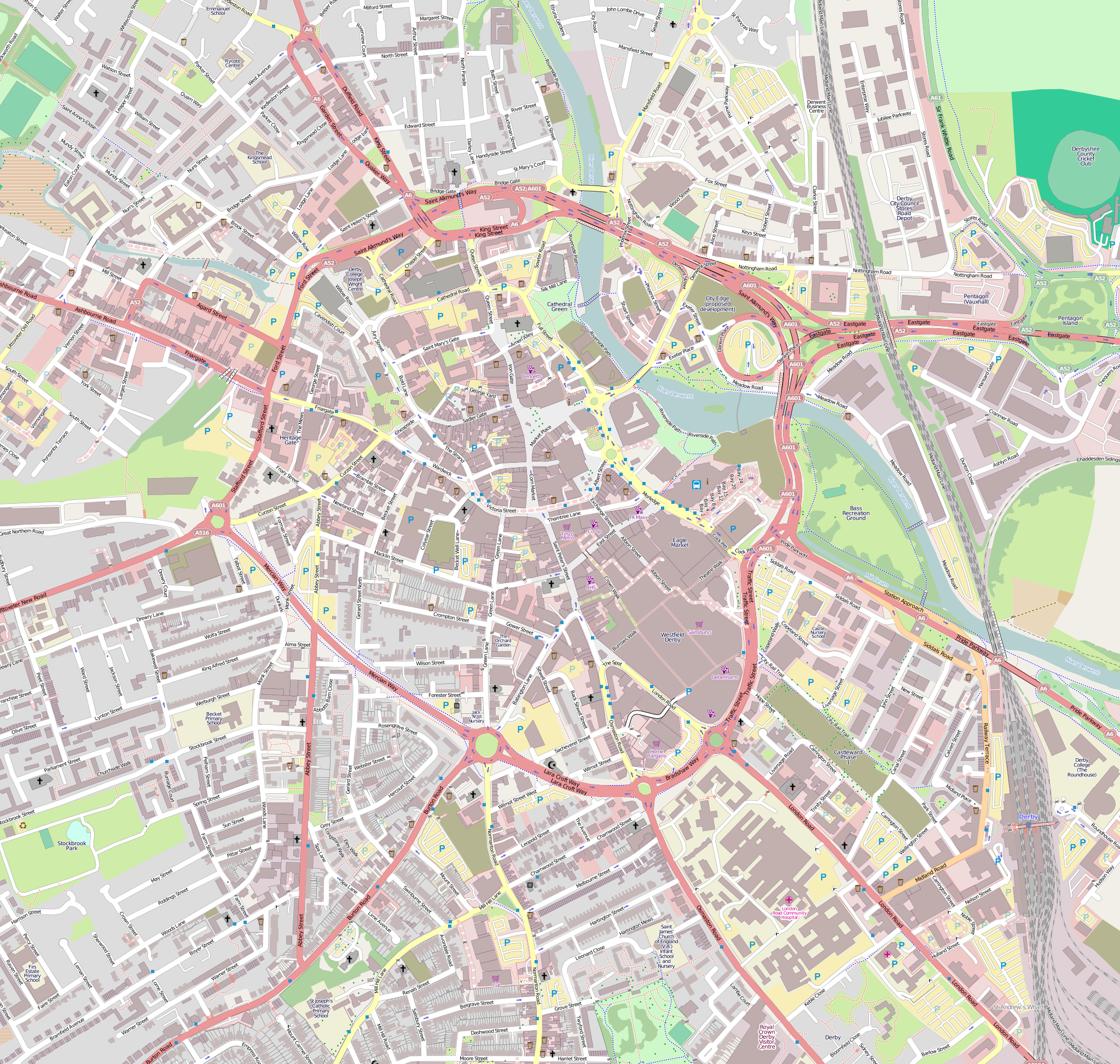
- Location within Derby
- 52°55′4.8″N 1°28′19.2″W
- Location: Derby, Derbyshire
- Country: England
- Denomination: Congregational

Architecture
- Architect: Henry Isaac Stevens
- Completed: 1843
- Construction cost: £5,000
- Closed: 1961
- Demolished: 1962

Specifications
- Length: 70 feet (21 m)
- Width: 45 feet (14 m)
- Height: 37 feet (11 m)

Derby Congregational Chapel was designed by architect Henry Isaac Stevens and was built in 1843. It stood on the corner of Traffic Street and London Road on a plot of land of 1,600 square yards. It was built of brick and stuccoed, with five circular-headed windows on each side, and a large square window at the eastern end. The portico and pediment supported by four columns was built in the Corinthian order, with Hollington stone. The contractors were Messrs Gascoyne. The chapel was extremely popular with worshippers.

The chapel was converted to the Coliseum Cinema in 1934. It was in direct competition with the Odeon (now Zanzibar nightclub) and was virtually opposite its biggest rival.

The building was closed in August 1961 when plans for the widening of Traffic Street were approved. It was demolished in early 1962, and no trace of the building remains today.

== Organ ==
The church organ was built by Forster and Andrews in 1846. A specification of the organ as recorded in 1934 can be found on the National Pipe Organ Register. After the church closed, the organ was moved to the United Reformed Church on Carlton Road, Derby.
