= Water Orton =

Village in Warwickshire, England

Coordinates: 52.517°N 1.736°W

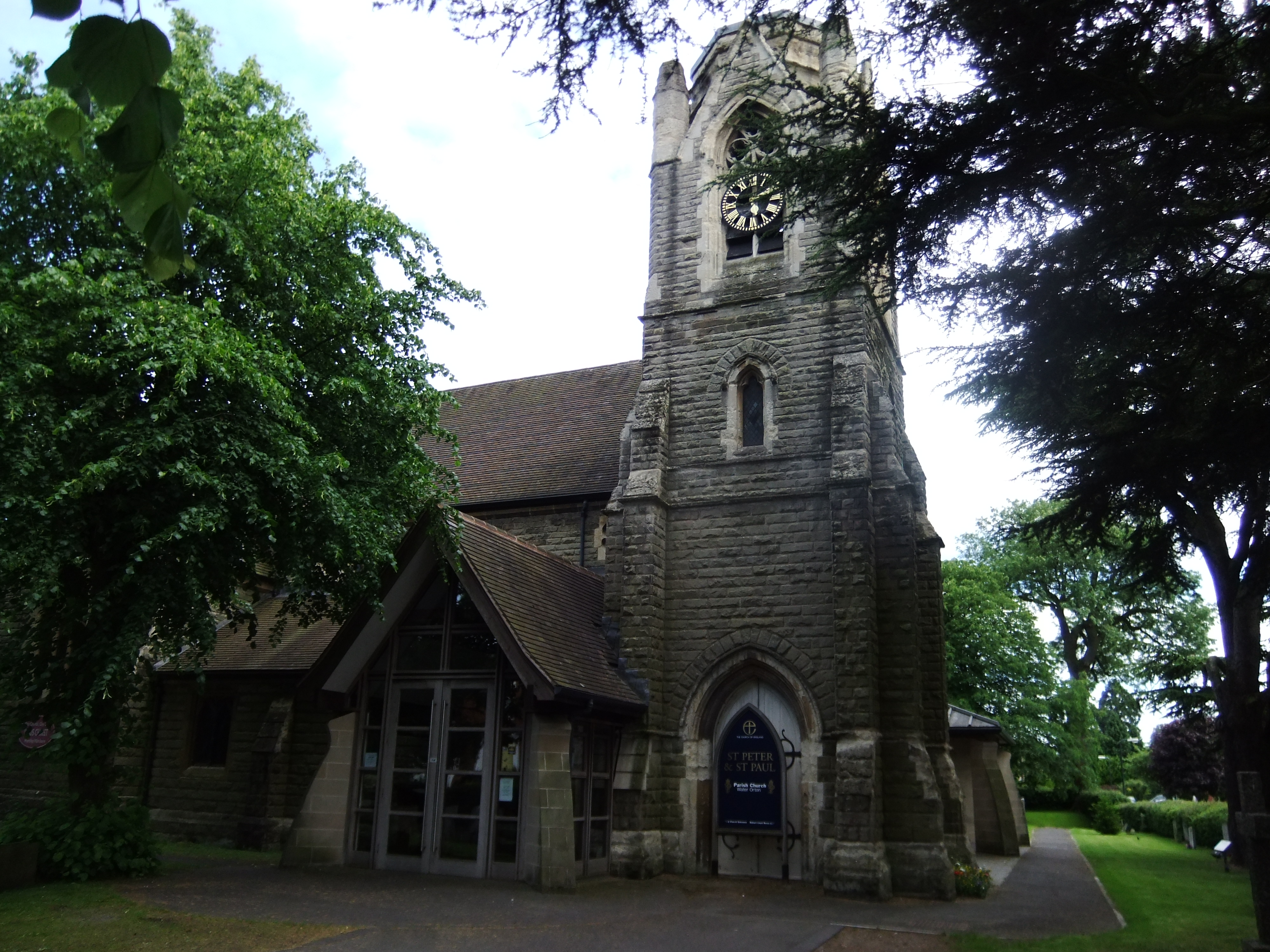
- St Peters' and St Paul's Church, Water Orton's parish church

- Location within Warwickshire
- Population: 3,487 (2021 Census)
- OS grid reference: SP179927
- Civil parish: Water Orton
- District: North Warwickshire
- Shire county: Warwickshire
- Region: West Midlands
- Country: England
- Sovereign state: United Kingdom
- Post town: BIRMINGHAM
- Postcode district: B46
- Dialling code: 0121
- Police: Warwickshire
- Fire: Warwickshire
- Ambulance: West Midlands
- UK Parliament: North Warwickshire and Bedworth

Water Orton is a village and civil parish in the North Warwickshire borough of Warwickshire in the West Midlands, England near the River Tame. It is located between Castle Bromwich and Coleshill, and borders the West Midlands metropolitan county boundary to the north, west and south. At the 2001 Census, the population was 3,573, falling to 3,444 at the 2011 Census. In the 2021 Census the population slightly rose to 3,487.

== Etymology ==
Water Orton was first documented in an Assize Roll of 1262 as Overton which means farm by the bank or edge. This usage continued to be recorded through the 13th and 14th centuries, but the name Oreton is recorded in the Warwickshire Feet of Fines in 1431. Water Ouerton is used in the Parish register of Aston in 1546 and Water Ouerton al. Water Orton in the Feet of Fines of 1605 and 1652. It is now thought that Water Orton may have been included in the Domesday Book in 1086 as 'Wavre' (Over) with Castle Bromwich.

== History ==
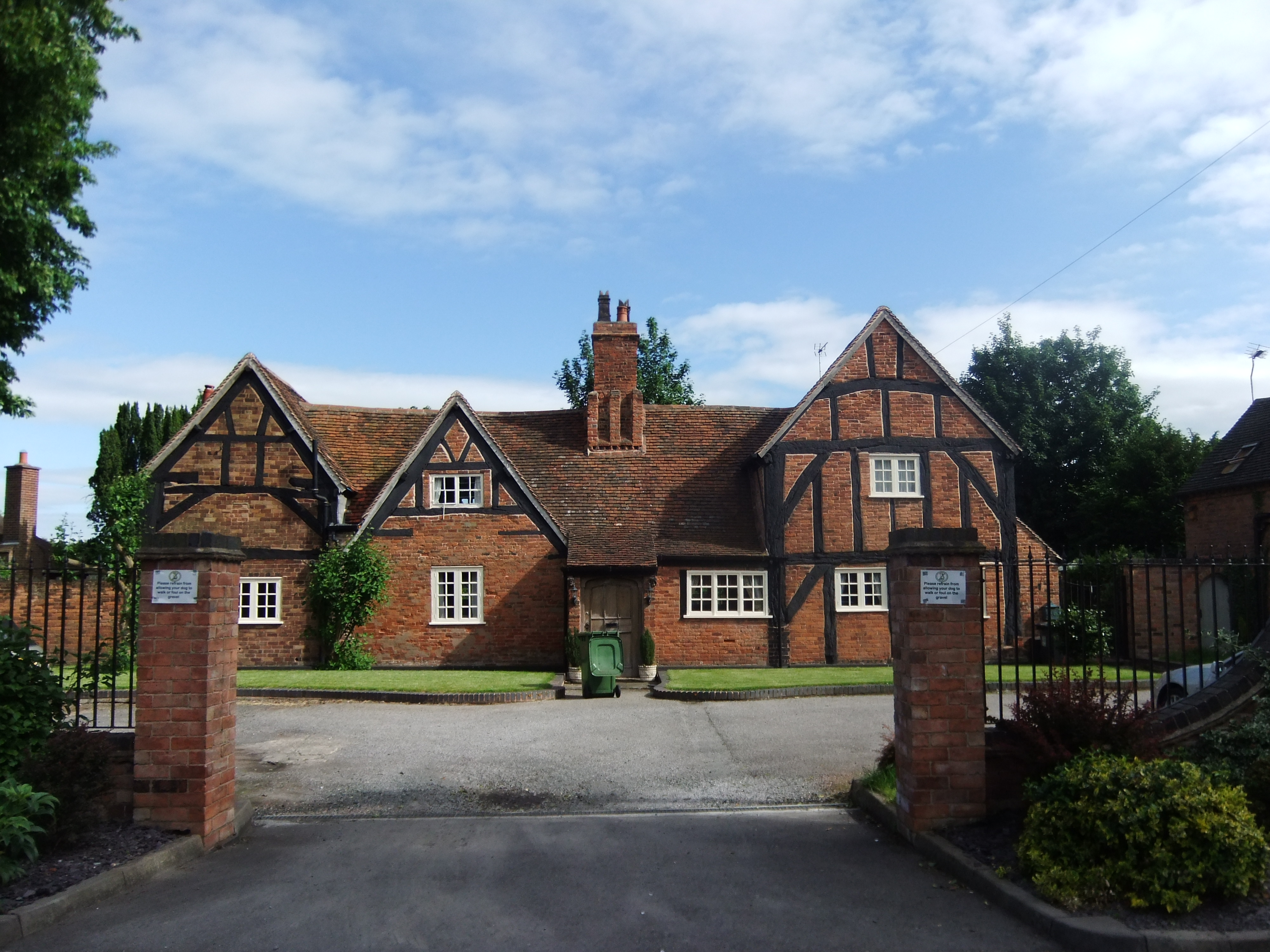
The Chestnuts, a 15th-century house in the old part of the village, may have been the old manor house

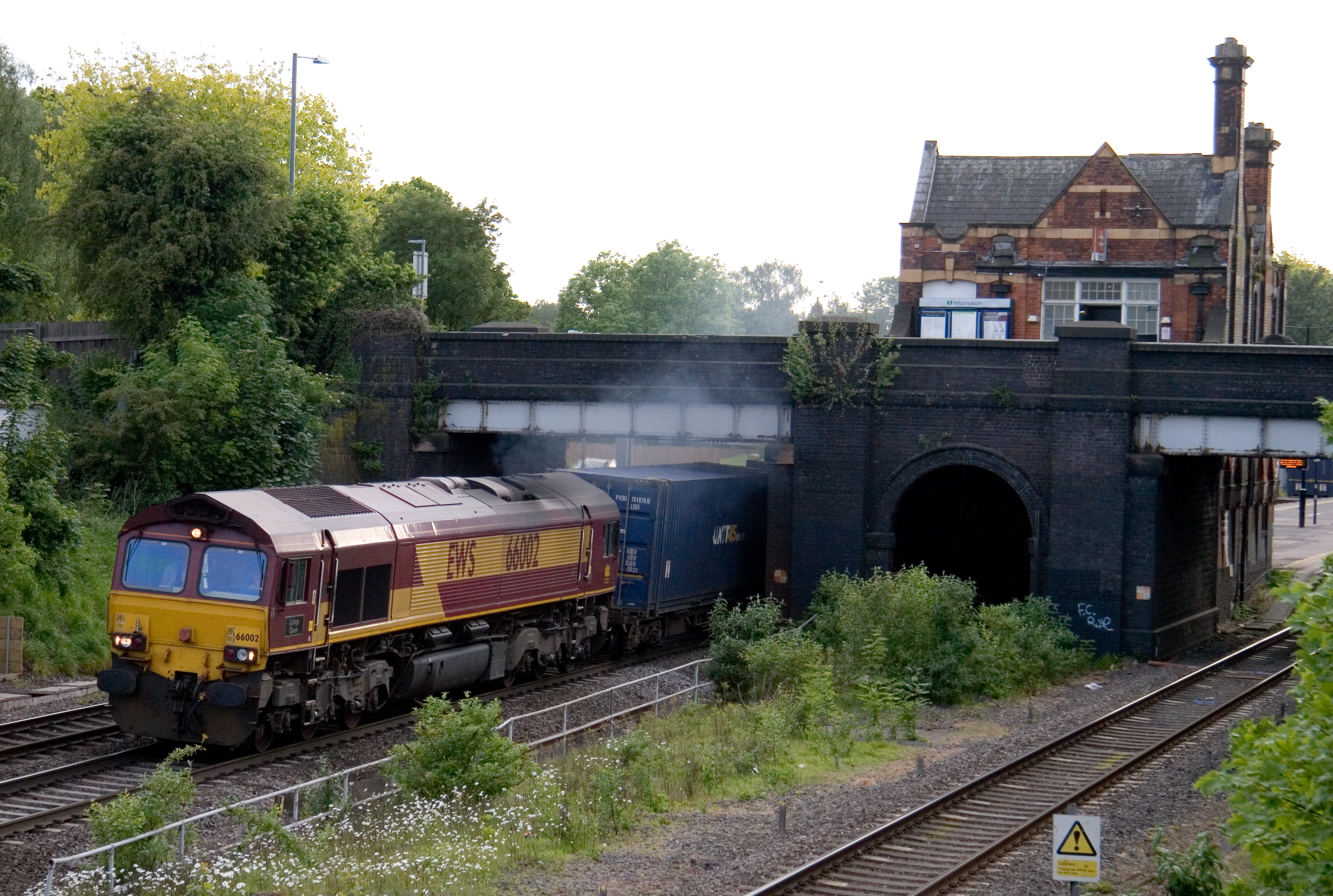
Train passing near Water Orton railway station

The oldest part of the village is centred on the western end of Old Church Road and was designated a conservation area in 1983. This area overlooking the crossing of the River Tame formed the original medieval settlement of Overton and has seen the discovery of pottery remains dating back to the 12th century. It contains a number of listed buildings including The Chestnuts, a 15th-century house with late 16th or early 17th century additions that may have been the old manor house; and Wakefield House, a timber framed house with a 17th-century main block and a 16th-century cross wing. Water Orton was originally part of the parish of Aston, forming a narrow extension of the parish along the River Tame to the north of the parish of Coleshill. Until the 14th century Water Orton's inhabitants attended ordinary church services at the chapel of ease in Castle Bromwich.

In 1346 they built their own chapel and were granted a license to have their own priest, although they remained subject to the mother church of Aston until 1871. The original chapel no longer remains but the graveyard in Old Church Road survives, including the stone village cross dating from 1347. The present Parish Church of St Peter and St Paul was built in 1879 for £4000 to a design by Bateman and Corser. It had a spire which was dismantled in 1987 after being declared unsafe due to the effects of atmospheric pollution. Until the 1840s Water Orton was mainly an agricultural village, but this changed with the coming of the railways. The first one was from Birmingham New Street to Derby via Water Orton, Coleshill, Whitacre Heath and Tamworth. Later a junction was constructed and another line was built via Kingsbury to Tamworth. The lines pass through the centre of the village.

Water Orton railway station dates from 1908 and is the second station. There were extensive sidings and much commercial traffic here, especially during and after the Second World War, until the activities of Dr Beeching in the 1960s. An effect of the railway was to increase house building in the village. Commuters could now make the journey to Birmingham's Lawley Street and Curzon Street (later Birmingham New Street) railway stations in a shorter time than by road. This made the village an ideal residential area for Birmingham professionals who wanted to get away from the city and live in the country. The railway also brought the Meat Industry here. There were large stock yards near the sidings and next to the Dog Inn in Marsh Lane. Cattle were offloaded from rail wagons into pens, then driven two miles down the road to butchers' slaughter houses in Castle Bromwich, where meat was provided for nearby villages.

== Features ==
There is a grade II listed sandstone bridge which is scheduled as an ancient monument over the River Tame on the road to neighbouring Minworth. It was built by Bishop John Vesey of Sutton Coldfield in 1520, replacing an earlier bridge that existed from at least 1469 that was recorded as being in a poor state when Reginald Boulers, the Bishop of Coventry and Lichfield, offered to issue an indulgence to anybody who would contribute to its repair.

== Education ==
The village is home to Water Orton Primary School. It opened in 1878 and was built to the designs of architect Edward Holmes. Due to the proximity of the school to the planned route of High Speed 2, it moved to new premises in 2019.

== Transport ==
The village is close to the M6, M6 toll and M42 motorways. Water Orton railway station was built in 1842 and is located at the junction of the B4118 and Birmingham Road. The station has limited services to Birmingham New Street and Leicester. The village is also served by the National Express West Midlands X13 bus to Birmingham and Chelmsley Wood via Coleshill. With effect from the 25th April 2022, occasional journeys on Diamond Bus service 76 has connected the village to Tamworth and Sutton Coldfield via Minworth.

== Notable residents ==
- Tim Bevan - racing driver
- Maurice Deebank - founder of the indie band, Felt
- Derek W. Jones - academic
- Lawrence - founder of the indie band, Felt
- Nicholas Pike - film and television music composer
- Thomas Watson - cricketer and clergyman
- Nathan Woodward - track and field athlete

== Sources ==
- Walmley and its surroundings (Chapter VIII: Water Orton), Douglas V. Jones, 1990, Westwood Press (ISBN 0-948025-11-5)
- Water Orton Station
