= Church of St Mary the Virgin and All Souls, Bulwell =

St Mary the Virgin and All Souls, Bulwell
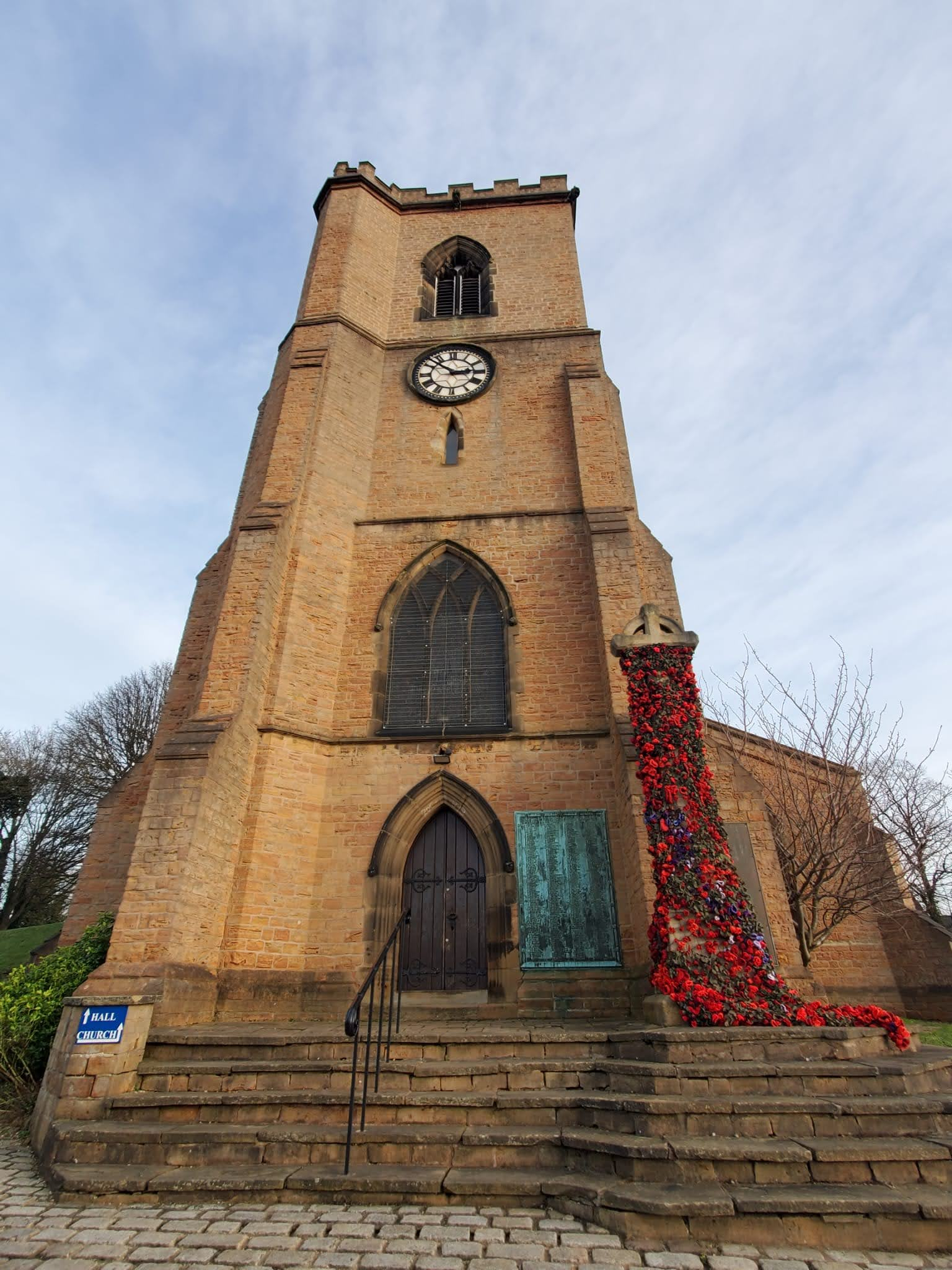
- St Mary the Virgin and All Souls, Bulwell

- Location within Nottinghamshire
- 53°00′00″N 1°11′39″W
- Location: Bulwell, Nottinghamshire
- Country: England
- Denomination: Church of England
- Churchmanship: High Church
- Website: www.achurchnearyou.com/church/17960/

History
- Status: Parish church
- Dedication: St Mary the Virgin and All Souls

Architecture
- Functional status: Active
- Heritage designation: Grade II listed

Specifications
- Length: 126 feet 2 inches (38.46 m)
- Width: 54 feet 6 inches (16.61 m)

Administration
- Province: York
- Diocese: Southwell and Nottingham
- Archdeaconry: Nottingham
- Deanery: Nottingham North
- Parish: Bulwell

Clergy
- Vicar: Fr. Andrew Fisher

The Church of St Mary the Virgin and All Souls, Bulwell is a parish church of the Church of England in Nottinghamshire, England.

The church is Grade II listed by the Department for Culture, Media and Sport as it is a building of special architectural or historic interest.

== History ==
The church was built on the site of an earlier church, dating from possibly the 12th century. This church was badly damaged by a storm in 1843.

It was constructed between 1849 and 1850 and the architect was Henry Isaac Stevens. The church was consecrated on 4 November 1850 by the Right Revd. Dr. Kaye, Bishop of Lincoln. The chancel was added in 1900 by William Arthur Heazell. The north chapel was added in 1946.

== List of Incumbents ==
- 1203 Robert de Pikering
- By 1207 Henry de Nottingham
- 1241 Robert de Coleham
- 1266/7 Edmund de Everleye
- 1269 William le Waleys
- 1281 William de Cravene
- 1283 William de Hemdeshille
- 1300 William de Batheley
- 1322/3 William de Dalton
- 1324 Hugh de Bardelby
- 1326 Bartholomew de Bradden
- 1332 Master Robert de Wyvill
- 1336 John Cravenham
- 1349 Michael de Lyndeby
- 1358 Robert Blakeman
- By 1366 Robert Radford
- 1377 William de Wythrington
- 1387 Robert de Cotum
- 1388 Philip Moungomery
- 1388 William Garton
- 1402/3 John Osmund
- 1414 John Frankeleyn
- 1430 John Grenehill
- 1465/6 John Elom
- 1501 John Wilson
- 1524 Richard Kirkby
- 1556 John Harrison
- 1564 George Bromeley
- 1588 Charles Aynsworth
- 1626/7 Robert Ainsworth
- 1641 Matthew Lacocke
- 1655 Thomas Greening
- 1667 Daniel Chadwyk
- 1701/2 Adam Turner
- 1729 Thomas Beaumont
- 1771 Robert Stanser
- 1812 Richard Ramsden Hawksworth
- 1817 John Wentworth Armytage
- 1865 William Henry Cantrell
- 1890 Thomas Barker Hardy
- 1898 Arthur Egerton Rose
- 1922 Stanley Mortimer Wheeler
- 1931 Donald Haseler
- 1938 Robert Percival Tinsley
- 1944 George Sprittles
- 1965 Bernard Hill
- 1970 Walter S Beasley
- 1998 Christopher Gale
- 2014 Andrew J Nicholls
- 2018 Andrew J Fisher AOJN

== Pipe Organ ==
A new organ was opened in 1852 by George Cooper, the assistant organist of St Paul's Cathedral. The current pipe organ dates from 1872 by Forster and Andrews. In 1899 a new organ chamber was built to house the organ and move it from its location in the north transept. A specification of the organ can be found on the National Pipe Organ Register.

=== List of Organists & Choirmasters ===
- Charles.G.Alloway 1874-1928
- Geoffrey Bond LRAM ATCL c.1950s-1960s
- Robert John Taylor c.1970s (formerly organist at Emmanuel Church, Nottingham)
- Bill Priestly until 1984, then retired
- Robert John Taylor c.1990s, then retired (second appointment)
- Michael Anthony 2007-2019, then retired (formerly organist and choirmaster at Heanor Methodist Church)
- Philip Miles 2019-2022, then organist at St John the Baptist Church, Beeston
- Howard Lee 2023-2025, then organist and director of music at St Charles Borromeo Church, Westminster
- Ian Bevel 2026

== Bells ==
The tower contains eight bells all by John Taylor and Company of Loughborough dating from 1919/20 and 1860.

== Clock ==
The 90-year-old clock was replaced by a new one by G. & F. Cope with an all-electric mechanism in 1949.
