= St Peter and St Paul's Church, Water Orton =

St Peter and St Paul’s Church, Water Orton
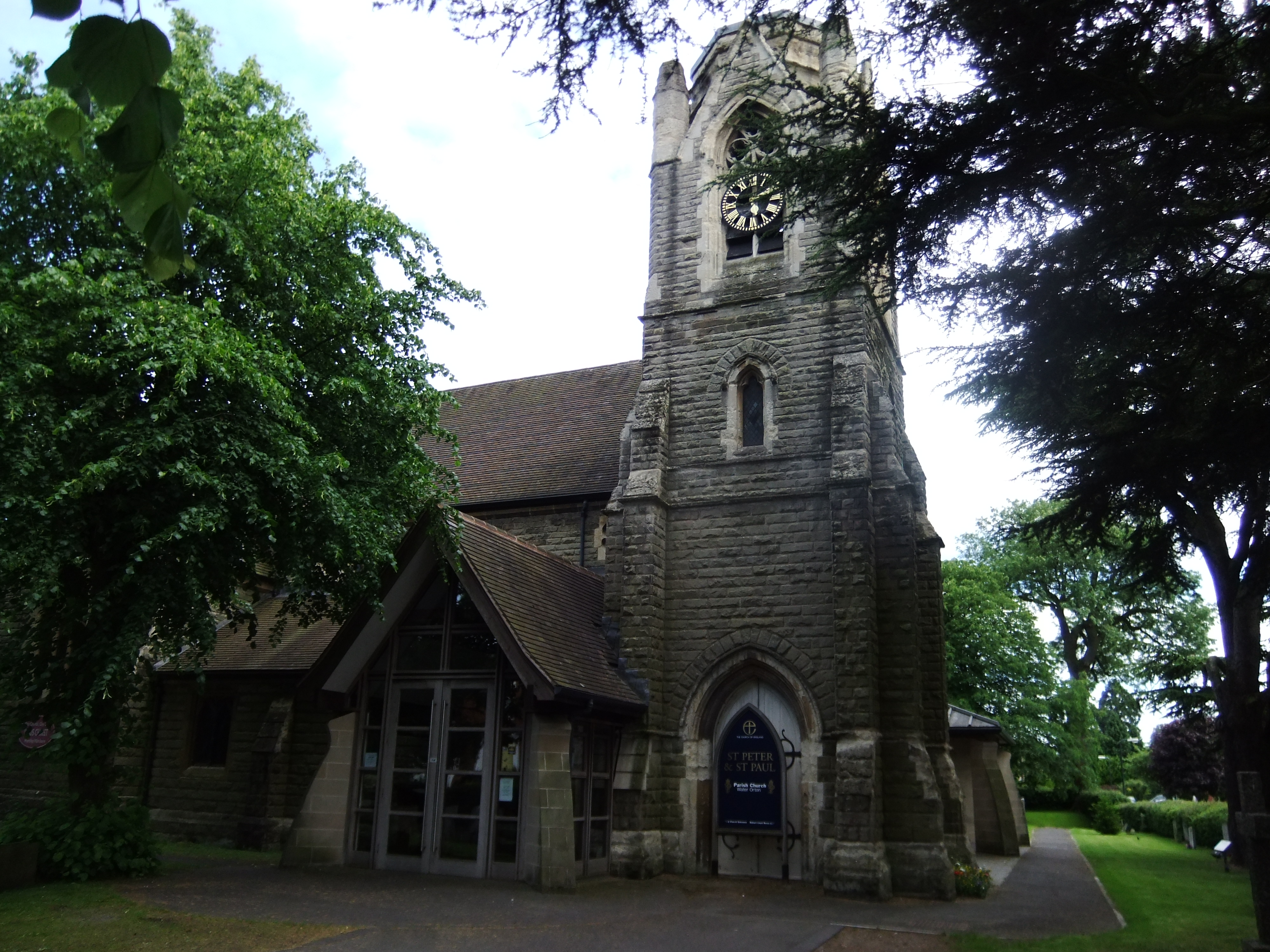
- St Peter and St Paul’s Church, Water Orton
- St Peter and St Paul’s Church, Water Orton
- 52°31′2.8″N 1°44′26.3″W
- OS grid reference: SP 17700 91095
- Location: Warwickshire
- Country: England
- Denomination: Church of England

History
- Dedication: St Peter and St Paul
- Consecrated: 7 October 1879

Architecture
- Heritage designation: Grade II listed
- Architect(s): Bateman and Corser
- Groundbreaking: 11 September 1878
- Completed: 1879
- Construction cost: £4,000

Specifications
- Length: 76.5 feet (23.3 m)
- Width: 29 feet (8.8 m)
- Height: Spire 100 feet (30 m) until removed

Administration
- Diocese: Anglican Diocese of Birmingham
- Archdeaconry: Aston
- Deanery: Coleshill
- Parish: Water Orton

St Peter and St Paul's Church, Water Orton is a Grade II listed Church of England parish church in Water Orton, Warwickshire, England.

== History ==
The medieval church was demolished and a new church erected by Bateman and Corser. The foundation stone for the new church was laid on 11 September 1878 by Mrs. J. D. W. Digby. The land was given by G.W. Digby of Sherborne Castle, Dorset. This church was consecrated on 7 October 1879 by the Bishop of Worcester. It was built in Derbyshire stone with Bath stone dressings. The contractor was H. Mottram of Tamworth.

The spire was removed in the 1980s. (after 1987)

== Organ ==
An organ by Forster and Andrews was installed in 1885. A specification of the organ can be found on the National Pipe Organ Register.
