= Forster and Andrews =

British organ-building company (1843–1924)

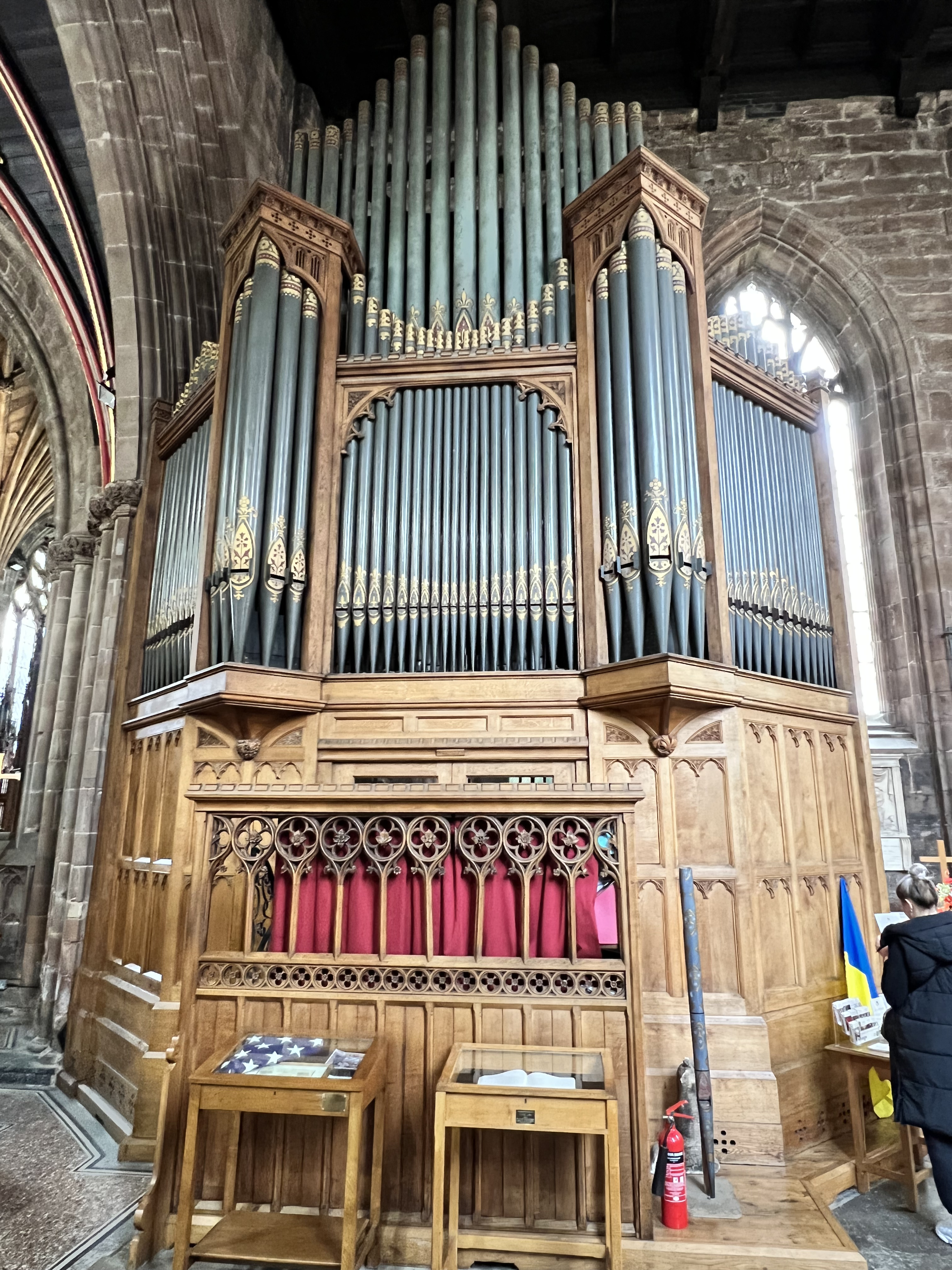
St Mary's Church, Nantwich, 1890

Forster and Andrews was a British organ-building company active between 1843 and 1924.

The company was founded by James Alderson Forster (1818–1886) and Joseph King Andrews (1820–1896), who had previously worked for the London organ builder J. C. Bishop. They opened their business in Hull in 1843, and it developed into one of the most successful organ-building firms in the North of England. The company was taken over by John Christie in 1924 and was finally wound up in 1956. In addition to its Hull headquarters, the firm maintained branches in London and York.

The German organ builder Edmund Schulze (1823–1878), who influenced Forster and Andrews, often recommended them to prospective clients when he was unable to accept commissions. The most notable example of this relationship was the large instrument completed in 1868 at All Souls' Church, Halifax, funded at the expense—and insistence of—Sir Edward Akroyd (1810–1877). It incorporated material by Schulze following a long visit by the partners to Germany, funded by Akroyd, to study Schulze's techniques.

== List of organs ==
- Congregational Chapel, Derby (1846)
- St Wilfrid's Church, Alford, Lincolnshire
- All Saints' Church, Hessle, Hull (1846); removed to St George's Church, West Grinstead, Sussex in 1890
- St Andrew's Church, Epworth (1849); now in St John the Baptist's Church, Burringham
- St James' Church, Hill, Birmingham (1853)
- St James' Church Glossop (1859)
- St George and St Mary's Church, Church Gresley (1860)
- Church of St Mary de Castro, Leicester (1860)
- St Peter's Church, Lowick (1861)
- Methodist Church, Partick, Glasgow (1862)
- St John the Baptist's Church, Collingham (1863 enlargement)
- All Saints' Church, Cambridge (1864)
- Castle Gate Congregational Centre, Nottingham (1865); organ rebuilt in St Salvatorkerk, Harelbeke, Belgium in 2012
- St Radegund's Church, Scruton (1865)
- St Peter & St Paul's Church, Aylesford (1865, extended F&A 1879)
- All Saints' Church, North Street, York (1867)
- York Oratory (1867)
- All Souls' Church, Halifax (1868)
- St Oswald's Church, Askrigg (1869, restored 1998)
- Sts Thomas Minster (1870)
- Church of St Mary the Virgin and All Souls, Bulwell (1872)
- Tondu Wesleyan Methodist Church, Bridgend, South Wales (1872)
- St Boniface Church, Antwerp (1873)
- St Andrew's Church, Walpole (1873)
- St George's Church, Modbury (1873)
- Ilkley Congregational Church (1873)
- St Peter's Church, Netherseal (1874)
- Unknown 1875, organ rebuilt in the Regenboogkerk (Rainbowchurch), Leiden, Netherlands in 2006
- St Philip and St James Church, Booterstown, Dublin (1876)
- St Paul's Church, Glenageary (c. 1876); rebuilt and enlarged by Derek Verso & Co. in 1993
- St Margaret's Church, Rochester (1877); subsequently extended by Browns in 1902
- St Mary's Church, Boyton, Wiltshire (1877); given to the church by Prince Leopold
- West Bromwich Town Hall (1878)
- Parish church, Hurlford, near Kilmarnock, Ayrshire (1878); removed from original installation to the former Reid Memorial Church at the union of the two in 1994
- Trinity Methodist Church, Harrogate (1880)
- Christ Church, Taney Parish (c. 1880, exact date unknown); rebuilt and altered by Kenneth Jones & Associates in 1989
- St Brigid's Church, Castleknock (c. 1880, exact date unknown)
- St Matthias' Church, Ballybrack (c. 1880, exact date unknown)
- First Methodist Church, Buenos Aires, Argentina (1882)
- All Saints' Anglican Church, Woollahra, Australia (1882)
- Holy Trinity Church, Stourpaine (1882)
- St Andrew's Presbyterian Church, Peru (1883); fully refurbished in 2017–2022
- The Church of the Holy Cross, Gilling East, Yorkshire (1883)
- St Patrick's Church, Dalkey (1883)
- St John the Evangelist's Church, Truro (1884)
- St John's Church, Glebe NSW, Australia (1884)
- Robertson Street Congregational Church, Hastings (1884)
- Rathfarnham Parish Church, Rathfarnham, Dublin (1885); rebuilt by R. E. Meates & Son Ltd in 1961
- St Padarn's Church, Llanbadarn Fawr (1885)
- St Peter and St Paul's Church, Water Orton (1885)
- St John the Baptist, Potters Bar (1885); moved to St Mary the Virgin & All Saints, Potters Bar in 1915 after St John's was closed
- Congregational Church (now shop), Tunbridge Wells (1885); organ rebuilt in the Reformed Church De Tabernakel, Vaassen, Netherlands in 1992
- St Audoen's Church, Dublin (1885)
- St Paul's Church, Clapham (1886); historically congruent rebuild of the organ was finished in 2019 by Andrew Cooper & Co. Ltd
- St Margaret's, Horsmonden (1886); rebuild and enlargement of a William Hill and Son organ, built in 1837
- All Saints' Church, Matlock Bank (1886)
- Saint Joseph's Church, Singapore (1888)
- St Mary's Church, Redbourn, Hertfordshire (1888)
- St Margaret and St Leonard's Church, Edinburgh (1888)
- St Peter's Church, Bourton-on-Dunsmore, Warwickshire (1888)
- All Saints Church, Frindsbury, Kent (1889)
- Saint-Paul's Church, Rennes, (1889)
- St Helen's Church, Ainderby Steeple (1889–90)
- St Mary's Church, Nantwich (1890)
- St Martin le Grand, York (1891); moved to St Thomas à Becket Church, Hampsthwaite in 1948
- St Wilfrid's Church, Egginton (1892); now at The Barn Church, Kew (1894)
- St Peter's Church, Field Broughton (1894)
- St Luke's Church, Shireoaks (1896)
- Holy Trinity Church, Rugby, Warwickshire (1896)
- St Peter's Church, Barton-upon-Humber (1898); moved to St Mary's, Barton-upon Humber in 1972–1974
- St James' Church, High Melton (1898)
- Nederlands Hervormde Kerk, Nieuwer ter Aa, The Netherlands (1898)
- St Mary's and St Helen's Church, Neston (1900)
- St Andrew's Church, Derby (1902)
- United Reformed Church, Llandudno, Wales (1902); rebuilt and enlarged in the Nazareth-Kirche, Hanover, Germany in 2018–19 by Orgelbau Reinhard Hüfken
- Parish church, Darvel, Ayrshire (1908)
- St Augustine of Hippo, Grimsby
- St Wistan's, Wistow, Leicestershire
- St Mary's, White Waltham (1892)
- Pilrig St Paul's Church, Edinburgh (1903)
- Seven Day Adventist Church (Ex Saint Michael A. Church), Iquique, Chile (1911)
- Saint Paul Church, Valparaíso, Chile
- St Lawrence church, Sigglesthorne, East Yorkshire
