= Henry Isaac Stevens =

British architect

- Born: 1806; London, England
- Died: 1873 (aged 66–67)
- Occupation: Architect
- Spouse: Anne Martin
- Children: 4

Henry Isaac Stevens FRIBA was an architect based in Derby. He was born in London, in 1806, and died in 1873. In the late 1850s he changed his name to Isaac Henry Stevens.

== Family ==
His parents were Isaac Stevens and Elizabeth Young. He married Anne, the daughter of William Martin on 7 August 1832 in Repton, Derbyshire. They had four children.

In the 1861, census he is listed as Isaac H Stevens living in Ashbourne Road, Mackworth, Derbyshire. In the 1871, census he is listed as living at 20 Peartree Road in Litchurch, Derby.

== Career ==
He was articled to William Martin in Bretby, and was also a pupil of George Maddox. He started in independent practice in 1834 in Hartshorne, Derbyshire. He moved to Derby in the late 1830s or early 1840s and was based at 16 Full Street in Derby. By 1847 he was at 49 Friargate, Derby. In 1857 he is listed as living in Mackworth.

He was awarded a Fellowship of the Royal Institute of British Architects on 21 January 1850.

He entered into a partnership with Frederick Josias Robinson, a former pupil, from 1859.

== New buildings ==
- Christ Church, Coalville 1836–38
- St James Church, Shardlow. 1837–39
- St. John the Evangelist, Donisthorpe, Leicestershire 1837–38
- Holy Trinity, Ashby-de-la-Zouch, Leicestershire. 1840.
- Holy Trinity Church, Trinity Square, Nottingham. 1841. Demolished 1958.
- Holy Trinity Church, Lenton, Nottingham. 1842
- St. Mary's Church, Stretton, East Staffordshire 1837–42
- St. Paul's Church, Hyson Green, Nottingham 1843–44
- Congregational Chapel, London Road, Derby. 1843–45
- St Martin's Church, Osmaston, Derbyshire, 1843–45
- St Alkmund's Church, Derby. 1844-46
- Holy Trinity, Clifton, Derbyshire 1844–45
- St John the Evangelist's Church, Hazelwood Derbyshire 1844–46
- St Stephen's Church, Woodville, Derbyshire 1845–46
- Holy Trinity Church, Kimberley, Nottinghamshire 1843–47
- St. Mary the Virgin, Coton in the Elms, Derbyshire 1844–47
- Osmaston Manor. 1846–49
- Christchurch, Ilkeston Road, New Radford, Nottingham. 1847. Demolished 1950.
- Emmanuel Church, Swadlincote, Derbyshire 1844–47
- Christ Church, Cotmanhay, Ilkeston, Derbyshire 1846–48
- St Edmund’s Church, Fenny Bentley, Derbyshire 1846–49
- St. Peter, Fordcombe, Penshurst, Kent 1847–49
- Church of St. Mary the Virgin and All Souls, Bulwell, Nottingham. 1849–50.
- Christ Church, Belper 1846–50
- St Bartholomew’s Church, Clay Cross, Derbyshire 1846–51
- All Saints' Church, Alderwasley Derbyshire 1849–50
- St. Paul's Church, Rusthall, Speldhurst, Kent 1849–51
- Christ Church, Ironville 1851–52
- Melbourne Athenaeum, Derbyshire. 1853
- Brewery at Burton. 1854–55
- St Helen's Church, Darley Dale, Derbyshire 1853–55
- St. John the Evangelist, St. John's Street, Mansfield. 1854–56
- Full Street Baths, Derby. 1856
- St. James' Church, Idridgehay, Derbyshire 1853–56
- St. Michael & All Angels, Alvaston, Derbyshire. 1856
- St. Margaret's Church, Blackfordby, Leicestershire 1856–58
- Ashby-de-la-Zouch Town Hall and Market Hall, Leicestershire, 1857
- St. Paul's Church, Low Moor, Prestwich, Lancashire 1867–70 with Frederick Josias Robinson.
- St. Luke's Church, Derby 1868–71 with Frederick Josias Robinson.
- Canterbury Street drill hall, Blackburn, Lancashire 1869–70 with Frederick Josias Robinson.
- St. James, Blackburn, Lancashire 1872–74 with Frederick Josias Robinson.
- W. W. Winter photographic studio, 45 Midland Road, Derby c. 1860s.

=== Gallery of new buildings ===
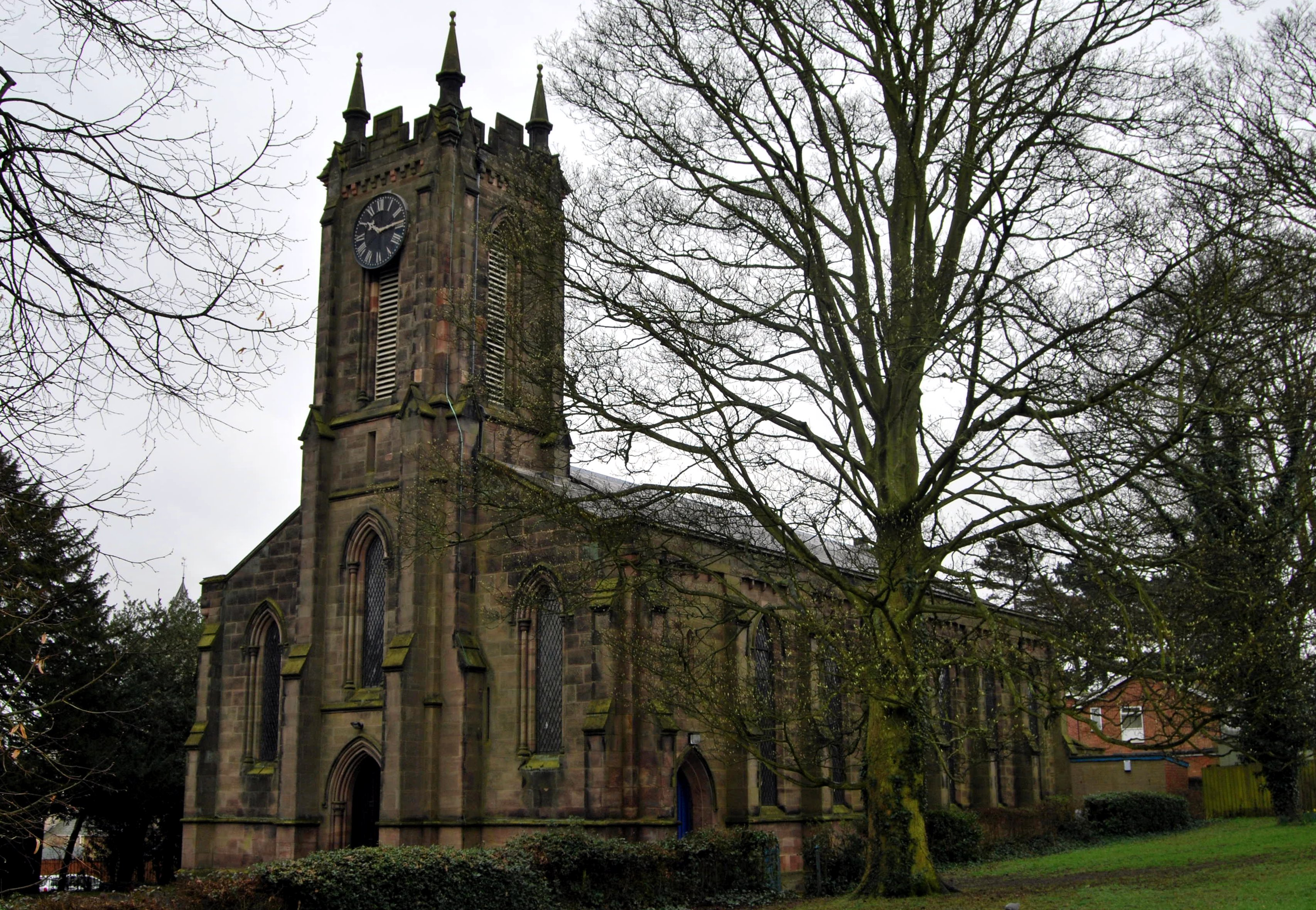
Holy Trinity, Ashby-de-la-Zouch

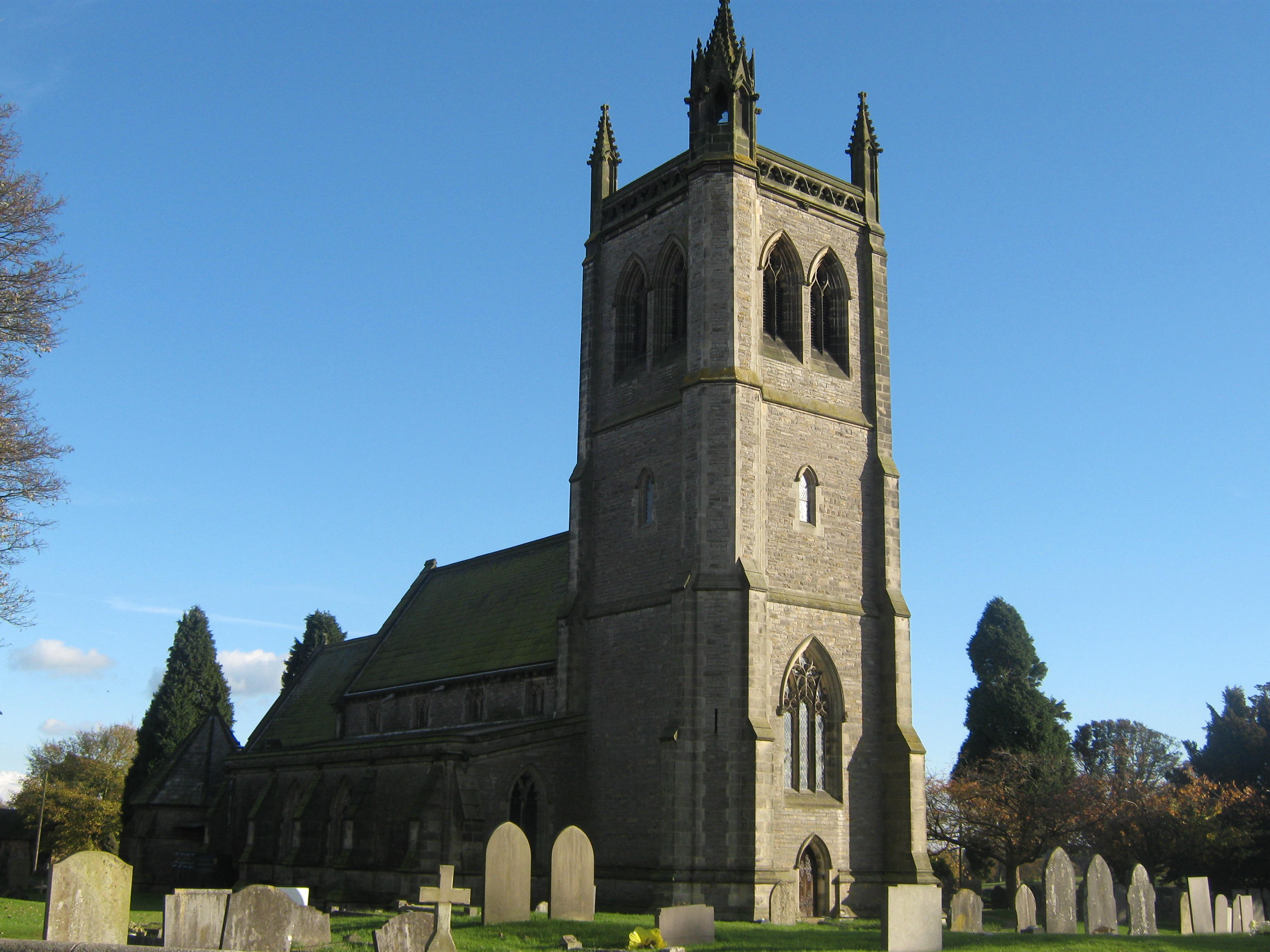
St. Martins in Osmaston

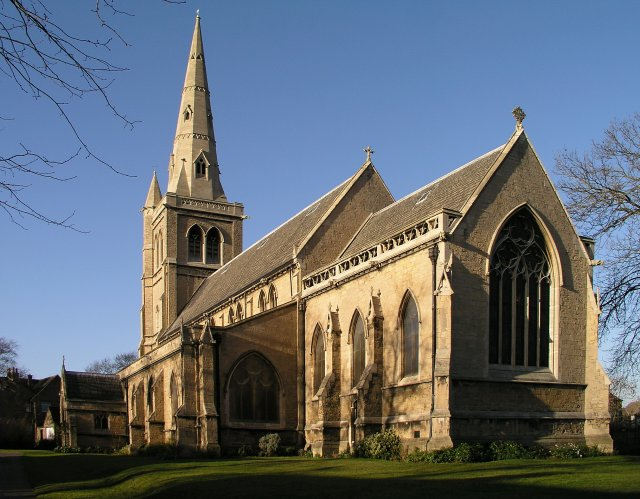
St. John's Church, Mansfield

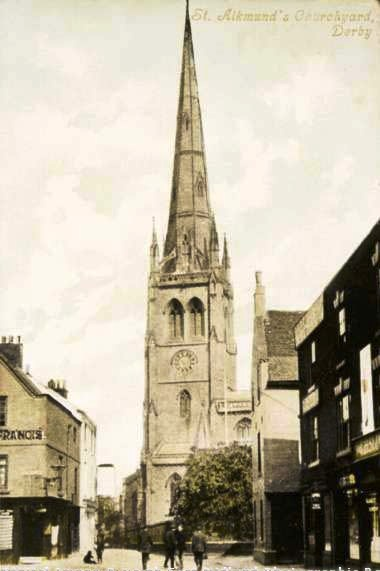
St Alkmund's Church, Derby

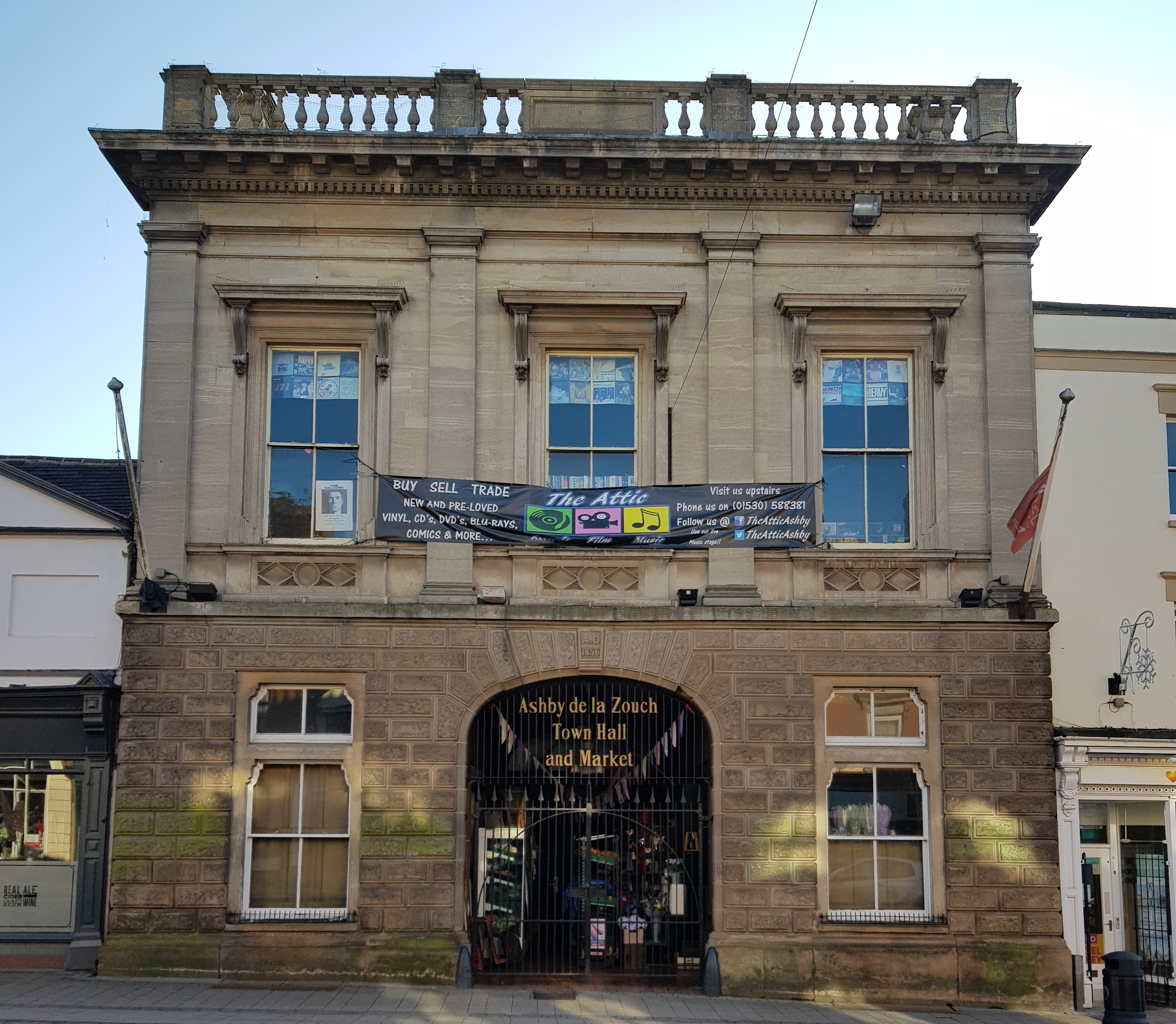
Asby-de-la-Zouch Town Hall and Market Hall

== Repairs and alterations ==
- St George's Church, Ticknall, Derbyshire 1840–42. Rebuild.
- St Michael's Church, Shirley, Derbyshire 1840–42. Enlargement.
- All Saints' Church, Risley, Derbyshire 1841
- St. Peter's Church, Swepstone, Leicestershire 1842. Repairs.
- St. Chad's Church, Longford, Derbyshire 1843–44. Repairs.
- All Saints, Dalbury, Derbyshire 1844–45. Enlargement.
- St. John the Baptist, Heather, Leicestershire 1846–47. Enlargement.
- St Leonard's Church, Shirland, Derbyshire 1847–49. Repairs.
- Derbyshire Royal Infirmary. 1850, 1867. Additions.
- St. Werburgh's Church, Friar Gate, Derby 1850–51. Enlargement.
- All Saints Church, Heath, Derbyshire 1852–53. Rebuild.
- St Paul's Church, Little Eaton, Derbyshire 1851–54. Enlargement.
- St. Paul's Church, Fazeley, Staffordshire 1851–55. Rebuild.
- Christ Church, Coalville, Leicestershire 1853–54. Enlargement.
- St. Michael & All Angels, Colwich, Staffordshire 1852–56. Enlargement and repairs.
- St Michael's Church, Derby 1856–58. Rebuild.
- St. Stephen's Church, Great Haywood, Staffordshire 1856–58. Enlargement.
- St. Peter's Church, Littleover, Derbyshire 1856–58. Enlargement.
- St Mary's Church, Cromford, Derbyshire 1858. Enlargement.
- All Saints Church, Mickleover, Derbyshire 1858–60. Enlargement.
- St. James' Church, Barton-under-Needwood, Staffordshire 1863–65 with Frederick J Robinson. Rebuild.
- All Saints Church, Findern, Derbyshire 1861–65 with Frederick J Robinson. Rebuild.
- Hartington Hall, Hartington, Derbyshire, 1861–66. Rebuilt west front.
- St. Mary Magdalene, Skegby, Nottinghamshire 1868–70 with Frederick J Robinson. Enlargement.
- St. Mary's Church, Gisburn, Lancashire 1868–71 with Frederick J Robinson. Repairs.
- Holy Trinity Church, Tansley, Derbyshire 1867–71 with Frederick J Robinson. Enlargement.
- St. Philip & St. James Church, Atlow, Derbyshire 1871–74 with Frederick J Robinson. Rebuild.
- St Peter's Church, Parwich 1872–73 with Frederick J Robinson. Rebuild.

== Sources ==
- The Buildings of England, Nikolaus Pevsner
