= Spondon Cricket Club =

English Cricket Club, based in Derbyshire

Coordinates: 52°55′41.59″N 1°24′13.92″W

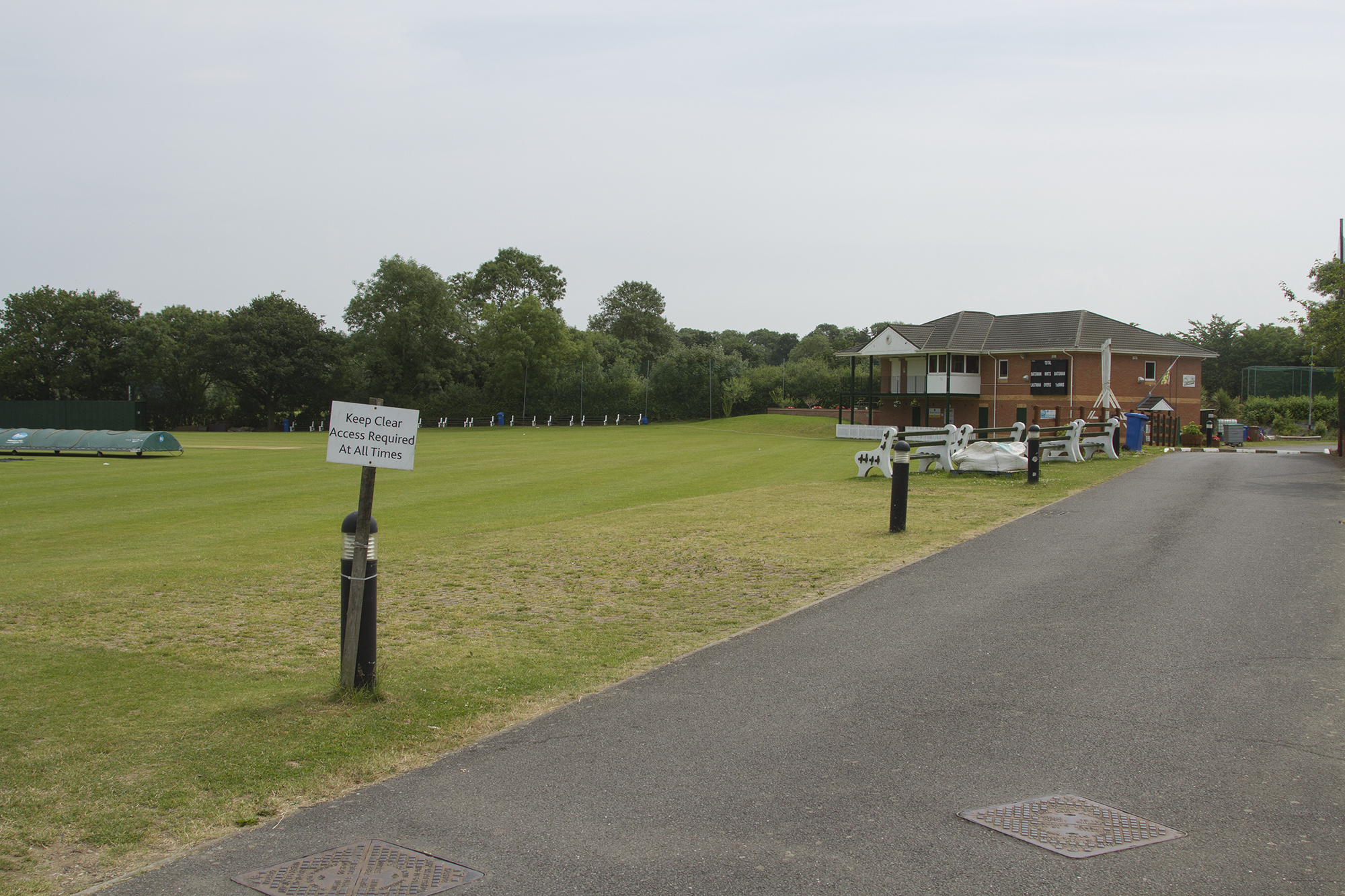
- Spondon Cricket Ground (2017)
- League: Derbyshire County Cricket League

Team information
- Founded: 1883
- Home ground: Locko Road, Spondon

History
- Prem Div wins: 2
- Div 1 wins: 1
- Official website: Spondon Cricket Club

Spondon Cricket Club is an amateur cricket club based in Spondon, Derbyshire, England. The club has a history dating back to the late 19th century.

== Ground ==
The home ground is located on Locko Road in Spondon, Derbyshire and has two pitches, an all-weather pitch and a two lane, all-weather net facility. The 1st and 2nd XI teams use the pitch directly in front of the pavilion, rated by the DCCL as a Grade A+ ground, and the 3rd and 4th XI use the pitch in the field beyond the 1st pitch, rated a Grade B ground.

== History ==
The earliest known record of Spondon Cricket Club dates back to 1883 when the local village boys were invited to join with the pupils of Spondon House School for Sons of Gentlemen. The school was housed in a Georgian mansion that was a secondary seat of the Drury Lowes, on the Locko estate. A pre match photograph survives from the period, showing the boys team on the school grounds. Both the school and the village team officially amalgamated in 1903 and set up a ground on Royal Hill Road. The club purchased the ground in 1924, and managed to pay the debt in full by 1945. The club had a 'golden age' in the 1960s with 16 trophies returning to Royal Hill Road between 1962 and 1972. The ground was further improved as a new pavilion was opened in 1970 by Brian Clough and a match between Derby County football team and Spondon CC. The club continued to thrive but eventually outgrew Royal Hill Road which was not big enough to play premier league cricket, or house the growing junior section and 3rd and 4th teams. In 2006 the Club sold the Royal Hill Road ground and moved to a ground on Locko Road. Their new Pavilion was officially opened by Councillor Roy Webb, Mayor of Derby 8 March 2006. The following year, the 1st XI won their first Premier League Championship.

The club currently has 4 senior teams competing in the Derbyshire County Cricket League, a Sunday 1st XI in the Mansfield and District Cricket League, an expanding girls' section which has developed into a Senior Women's League team, and a junior training section that play competitive cricket in the Erewash Young Cricketers League.

== Club Performance ==
The Derbyshire County Cricket League competition results showing the club's positions in the league (by Division) since 1999.

Key
Gold	Champions
Red	Relegated
Grey	League suspended

Key (cont.)
P	ECB Premier League
1	Division 1
2	Division 2
3	Division 3, etc.

Key (cont.)
N	North
S	South
E	East
C	Central

Derbyshire County Cricket League
Team	1999	2000	2001	2002	2003	2004	2005	2006	2007	2008	2009	2010	2011	2012	2013	2014	2015	2016	2017	2018	2019	2020	2021	2022	2023	2024	2025	2026
1st XI	1	1	1	1	1	1	1	P	P	P	P	P	P	P	P	P	P	P	P	P	P	P	P	P	P	P	P	P
2nd XI	3B	3B	3B	3A	3S	4S	3S	2S	2S	2S	2	2	3	3	4S	4S	4S	3	4N	3	2	2S	2	2	2	2	2	2
3rd XI	5B	5A	4E	4D	6S	6S	7S	6S	5S	5S	6S	6S	6S	6S	6S	6S	6S	5S	5S	5S	4S	4SN	4S	4S	4S	4S	4S	4S
4th XI	(not in league)							7C	6C	7E	8S	8S	8S	8S	9S	9N	9N	9N	8N	7N	6N	6SN	6N	6N	6N	7N	7S	6S

== Club Honours ==
Derbyshire County Cricket League
Premier	Champions	2007, 2019
Division 1	Champions	1962, 1965, 1967, 1971, 2005
Division 2	Champions	1966, 1985, 1987
Division 3	Champions	1966, 1967, 1970, 1984, 2018
Division 4	Champions	2005, (Note: Division 4S.) 2015, 2017 (Note: Division 4N.)
Division 5	Champions	1999, (Note: Division 5B.) 2000 (Note: Division 5A.)
Division 6	Champions	1978, 1981, 1985, 2006, (Note: Division 6S.)
Division 7	Champions	2008, (Note: Division 7E.) 2018 (Note: Division 7N.)
Division 8	Champions	2017 (Note: Division 8N.)
Division 9	Champions	2016 (Note: Division 9N.)

DCCL - Cup Competitions
Winners	Premier Cup	2017
Winners	Bayley Cup	1965, 1967, 1969, 1971, 2018
Winners	James Harwood Cup	2006, 2012
Winners	Premier T20 Finals Day	2010, 2021
Winners	XXXX Trophy	2005
Winners	Silver Link Trophy	2000
Winners	Milfern Cup	1986
Winners	Wright Cup	1965, 1966, 1967, 1971, 1981
Winners	Cresswell Cup	1981

Mayor of Derby Charity Cup Competitions
Winners	OJ Jackson Cup	1962, 2008, 2010, 2011, 2014, 2017, 2019
Winners	Butterley Cup	1996, 2011, 2019, 2025

Derbyshire Cricket Board Indoor Competition
Division 1	Champions	2014, 2015, 2022
Division 2	Champions	2016

Derby & District Cricket League
Division 1	Champions	1905, 1909, 1914, 1933, 1945, 1948
Division 2	Champions	1909

Stapleford & District League
Division 1	Champions	1923

== Events on film ==
- Cricket fielding mishap goes viral: 23 April 2019
- Neil Kellogg talks about his association with Spondon Cricket Club
- CricketForce Day at Spondon Cricket Club

== See also ==
- Club cricket
