= Ticknall =

Village in South Derbyshire, England

Coordinates: 52.812°N 1.481°W

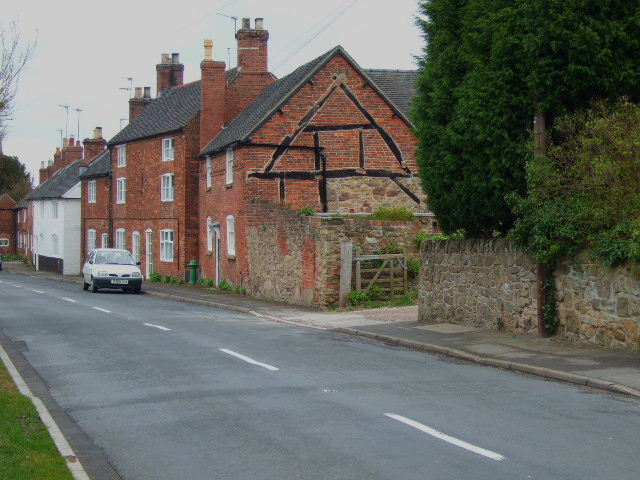
- Ashby Road, Ticknall (2007)

- Location within Derbyshire
- Area: 6.997 sq mi (18.12 km^{2})
- Population: 642 (2011)
  - Density: 92/sq mi (36/km^{2})
- OS grid reference: SK350239
  - London: 107.27 mi (172.63 km)
- Civil parish: Ticknall
- District: South Derbyshire
- Shire county: Derbyshire
- Region: East Midlands
- Country: England
- Sovereign state: United Kingdom
- Post town: DERBY
- Postcode district: DE73
- Dialling code: 01332
- Police: Derbyshire
- Fire: Derbyshire
- Ambulance: East Midlands
- UK Parliament: South Derbyshire
- Website: Ticknall Parish Council

Ticknall is a small village and civil parish in South Derbyshire, England. The population of the civil parish (including Calke) at the 2011 Census was 642. Situated on the A514 road, close to Melbourne, it has three pubs, several small businesses, and a primary school. Two hundred years ago it was considerably larger and noisier with lime quarries, tramways and potteries. Coal was also dug close to the village. Close to the village is Calke Abbey, now a National Trust property.

== History ==
The old village of Tichenhalle is mentioned in the Domesday Book in the Hundred of Walecros in the county of Derbyshire. Ticknall was an estate village to Calke Abbey until late in the 20th century and reached its heyday in the late 18th and early 19th centuries, when the limeyards and the brickmaking, tile and pottery industries were operating at maximum capacity. The census of 1851 returned a population of 1,241, double the present number of around 650.

St George's Church, Ticknall, is the Grade II listed Church of England parish church. It was built in 1842, replacing a medieval building.

Dame Catherine Harpur, wife of Sir John Harpur, founded a village school in 1744, to provide free education for the boys and girls of Ticknall and the surrounding parishes. From 1903 to 1987, the school was a voluntary controlled Church of England primary school. The school is now operated as an independent charitable school.

Since the neighbouring Calke Abbey changed its status in 1984 from long-standing private occupation by the Harpur-Crewe family to semi-public administration by the National Trust, much of the village has changed. The break-up of the former estate has meant the sale of cottages and building land, altering not only the randomness of the architecture, but also the dilution of the former feudal relationship between the villagers and their somewhat reclusive lords of the manor. The village has developed with examples of new buildings and renovations.

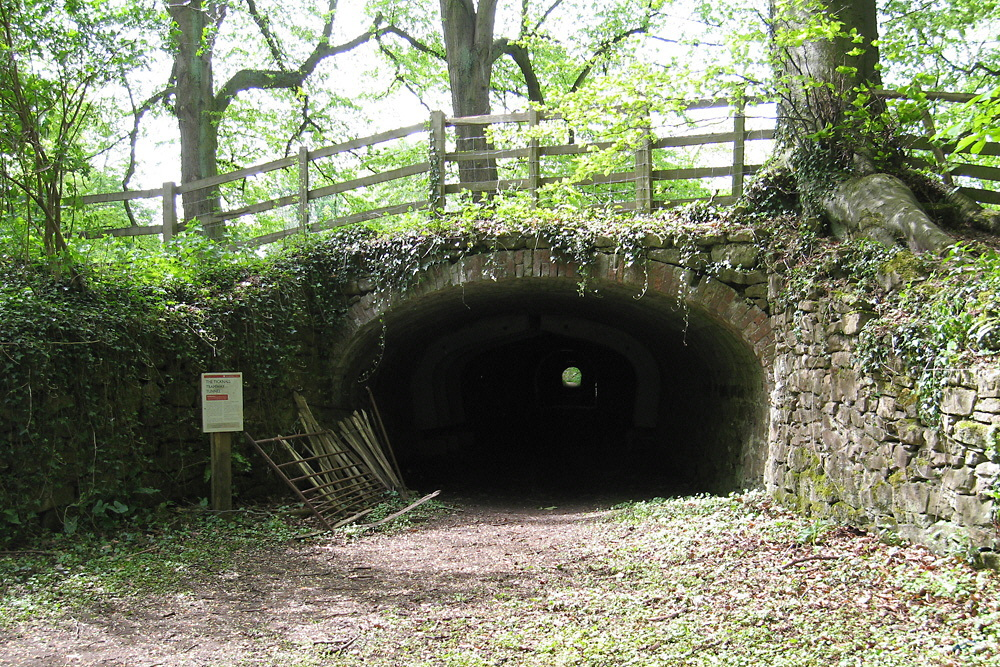
Ticknall Tramway tunnel, on the outskirts of Ticknall

Near the entrance to Calke Abbey is Tramway Bridge, which is now a Grade II listed structure. There is also a tramway tunnel, almost 140 yards in length, under the drive to Calke Abbey. The National Trust restored it in the 1990s and it can be traversed on foot. It was built in 1802 by the Derbyshire engineer Benjamin Outram to carry the former Ticknall Tramway and subsequently connect the brickyards and limeyards around the village to the Ashby canal at Willesley Basin. It was too costly to build the expensive locks that would have been required to bring the canal to Ticknall, so the tramway was constructed as a cheaper alternative. Although abandoned in 1915, the tramway can still be traced intermittently along its route, which passed through the estate of Calke Abbey where two tunnels were needed.

At the start of the 19th century the Ticknall Limeyards were operated by two different classes of people, namely freeholders and tenants. Some of the freeholders in the parish had their own limeyards while others were worked by tenants for the Harpur-Crewe and Burdett families. As the century progressed the freeholders went bankrupt for various reasons while the tenants of the Harpur-Crewe family gave up because of the high rents charged and general mismanagement of the limeyards.

The village has three pubs: The Wheel, The Staff of Life and the Chequers Inn. The latter dates from the 17th century. On the lanes throughout the village are several water pumps. These sturdy and attractive cast-iron devices were introduced into the village around 1914 by Sir Harper Crewe to what was then the estate village to provide fresh water. Several of these unusual pumps still work and are still used by walkers.

In June 2023 the rare hazel dormouse was reintroduced to woodland in the National Forest near Calke Abbey. Thirty-eight dormice were released by wildlife charity People's Trust for Endangered Species.

== Sport and Leisure ==
=== Cricket ===
Ticknall Cricket Club is an English amateur cricket club with a history of cricket in the village dating back to the 1850s. The club ground is on The Grange, Repton Road. Ticknall field three senior teams in the Derbyshire County Cricket League and run a junior training section that plays competitive cricket in the South Derbyshire Development Group.

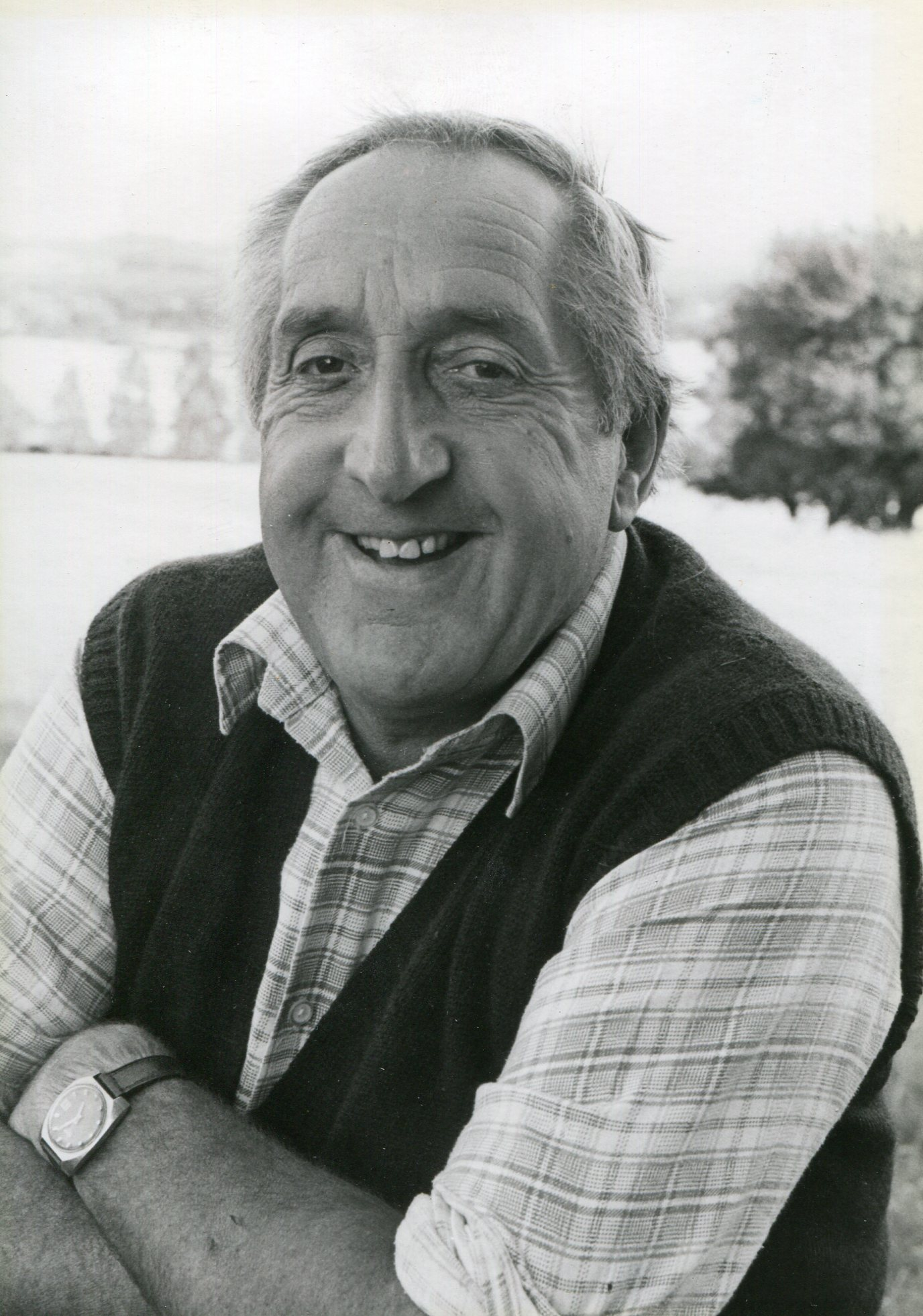
Ted Moult, 1984

== Notable residents ==
- John Smith (1814–1864), who was awarded the VC, for the Siege of Delhi (1857).
- Henry Dennis (1818–1887), hymnist and composer, wrote the hymn tune Euphony
- Sir John Harpur Crewe, 9th Baronet (1824–1886), from Calke Abbey; High Sheriff of Derbyshire in 1853.
- Ted Moult (1926–1986), TV personality, farmed here.

== See also ==
- Listed buildings in Ticknall

== Gallery ==
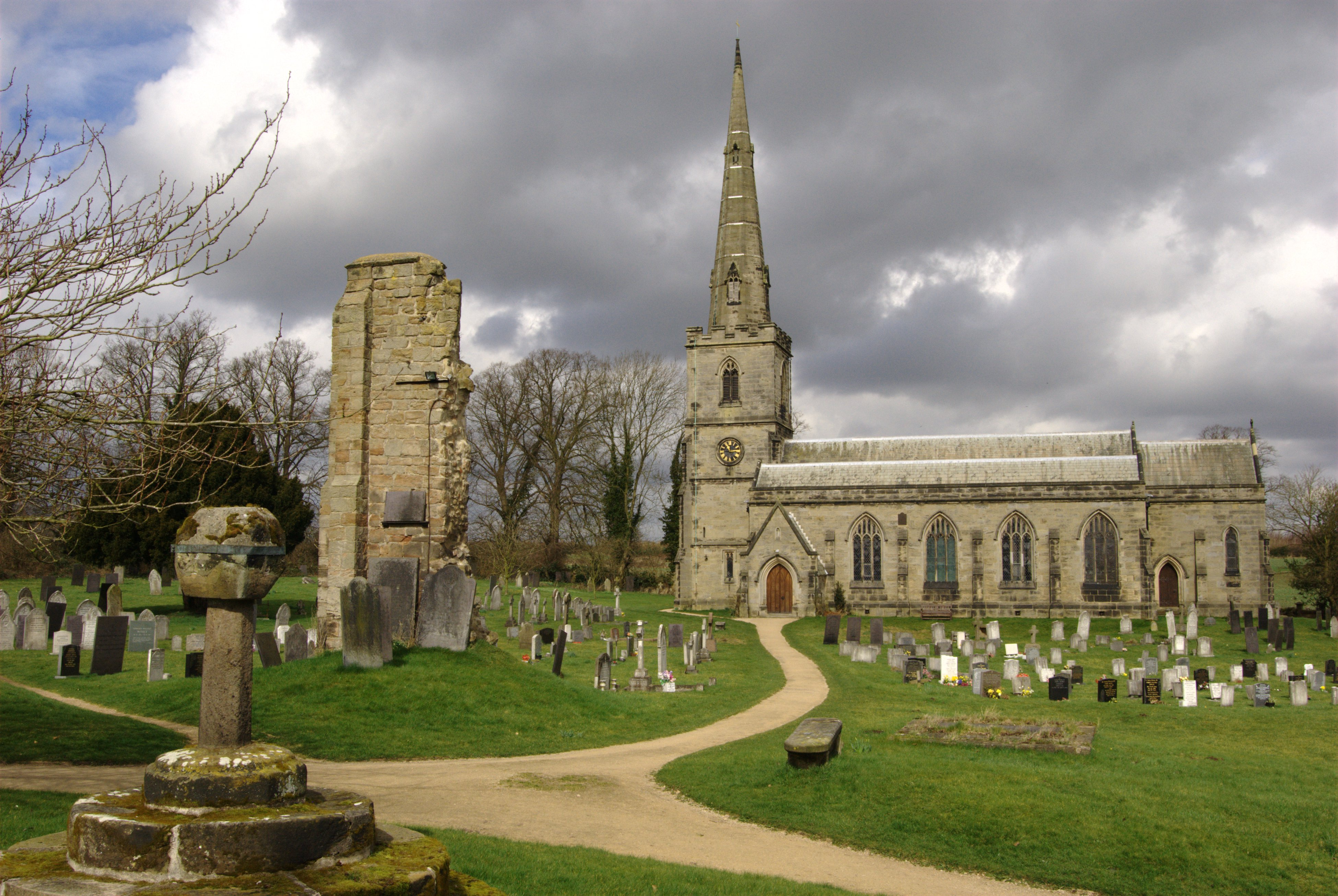
St George's, Ticknall with remains of old church

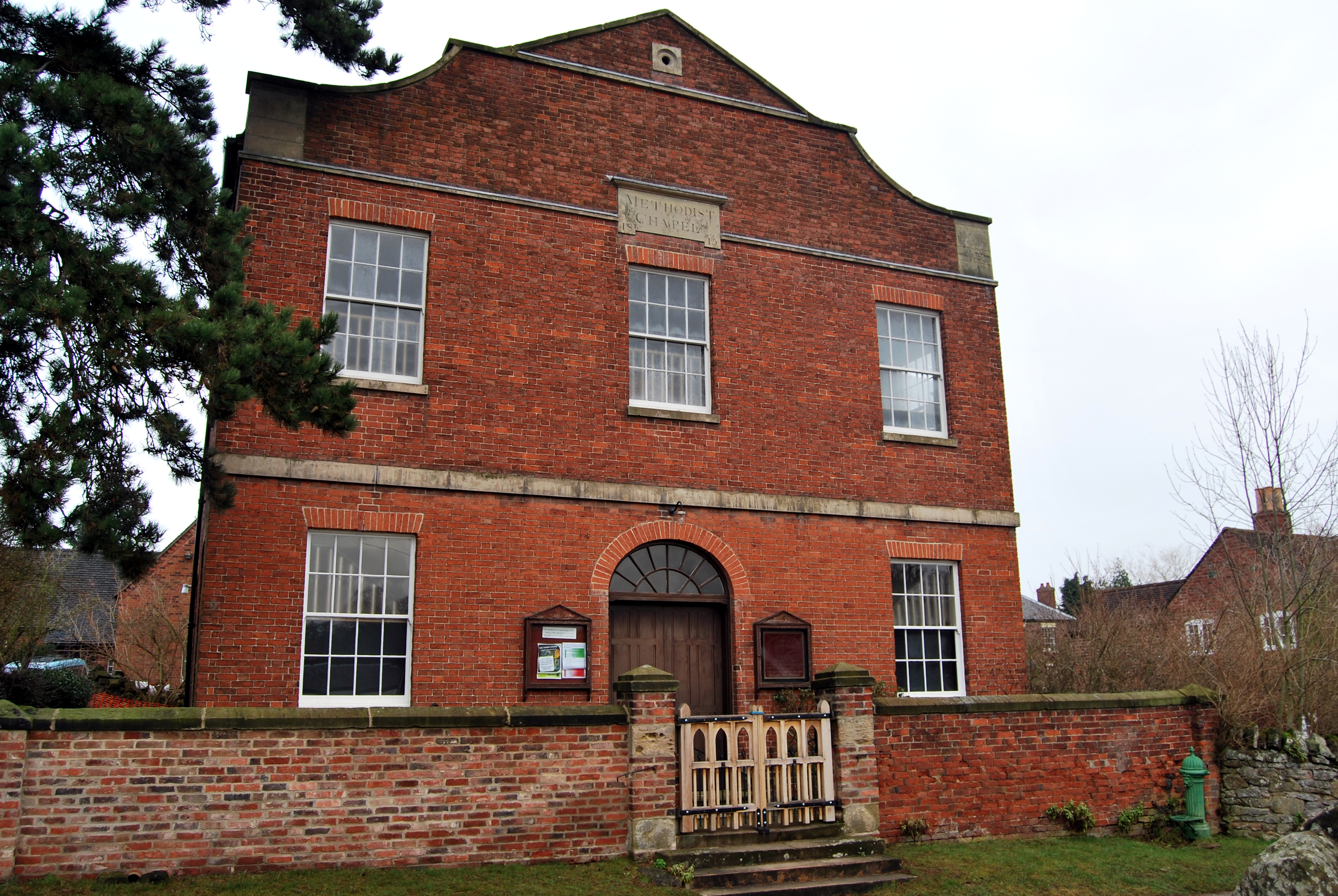
Ticknall Methodist Chapel

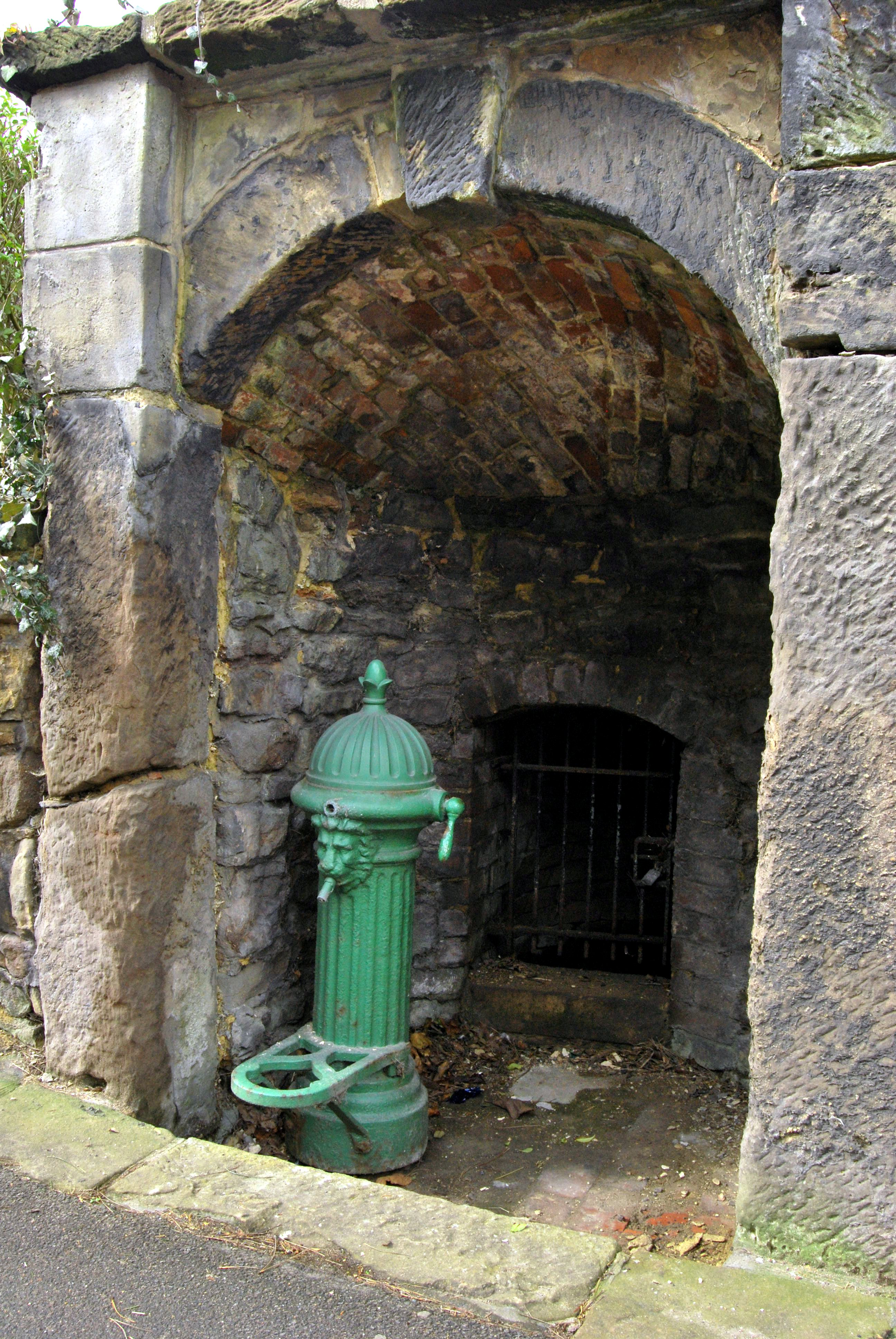
One of several Water Pumps

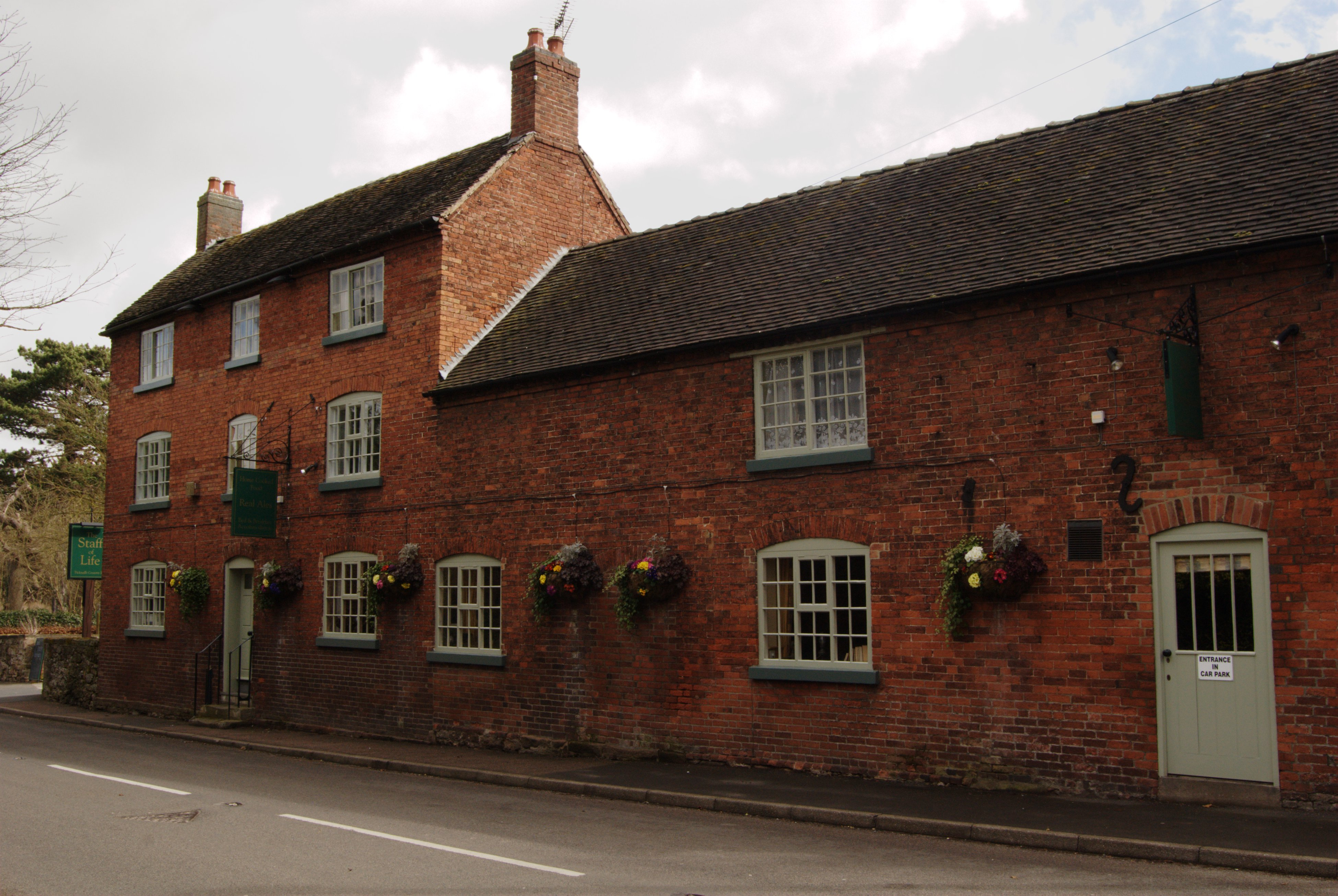
Staff of Life

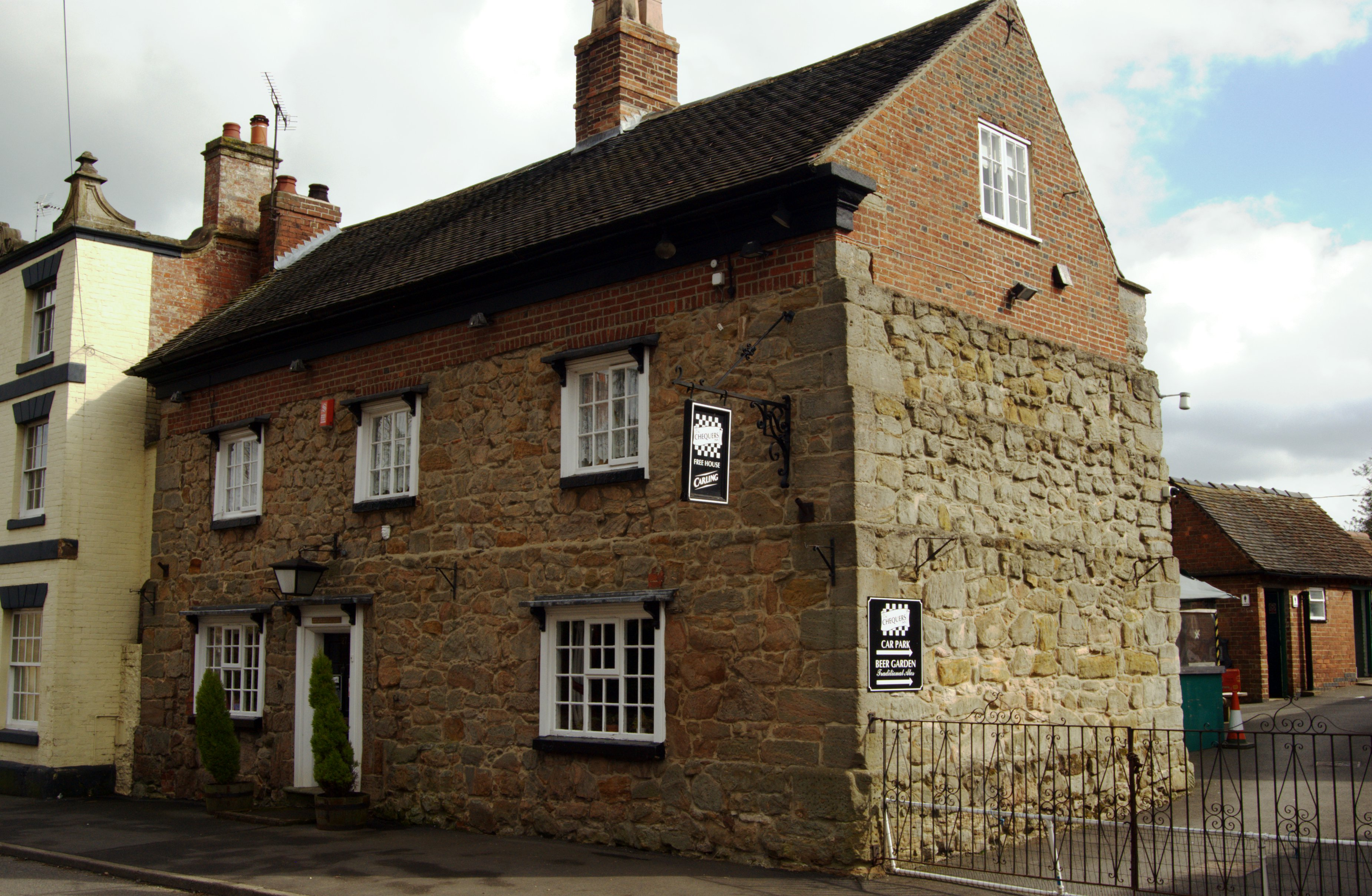
Chequers Inn
