= Chesterfield Cricket Club =

English amateur cricket club

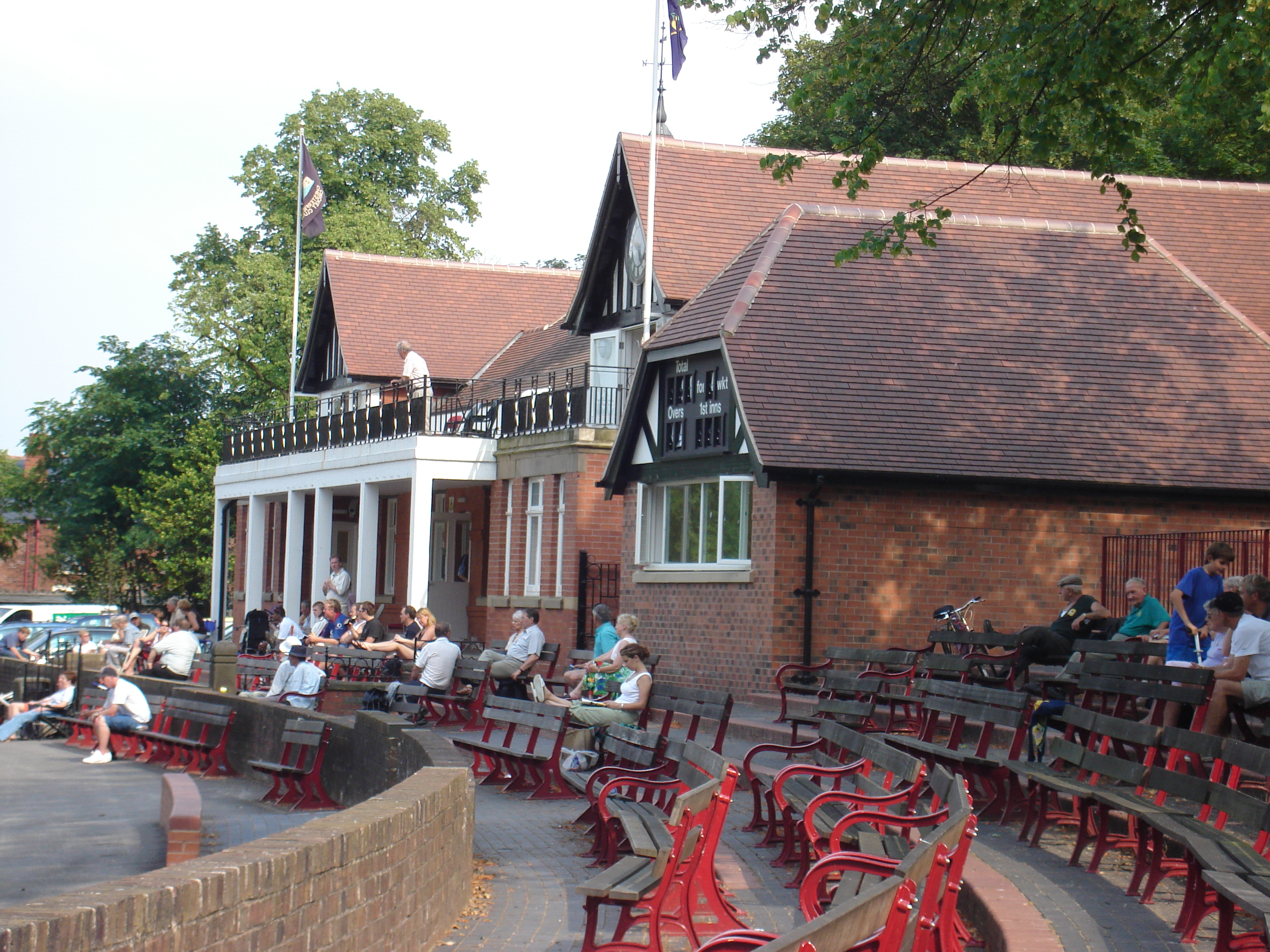
- Chesterfield Cricket Club pavilion

Team information
- Home ground: Queen's Park, Chesterfield

History
- DCCL ECB Premier Division wins: 1
- DCCL Division 1 wins: 1
- Official website: Cricket Club

Chesterfield Cricket Club is an English amateur cricket club, the second largest in Chesterfield, Derbyshire and is a member of the Derbyshire County Cricket League.

== Ground ==
Chesterfield's main ground, Queen's Park, includes a pavilion, 3 artificial and 2 grass net facilities. Queen's Park has a proud history of annually hosting 1st Class recreation matches between 1898 - 1998. On the 26 June 1948, Queen's Park hosted a County Championship match between Derbyshire and Yorkshire with a record 14,000 spectators packed into the ground. Today, Chesterfield Cricket Club's 1st and 2nd XI teams use the Queen's Park pitch, rated by the Derbyshire County Cricket League as a Grade A+ ground, and the club's 3rd XI team use a pitch south of Chesterfield on Deer Park, Wingerworth, rated as a Grade B ground.

== History ==
The origins of Chesterfield Cricket Club go back to the 19th century with the New Recreation Ground on Saltergate listed as their home ground. A 3-day match was recorded at the ground between Chesterfield and the 'All England Eleven' in 1869. By 1894, the club was granted permission to move to Queen's Park and a record shows Chesterfield playing in the Derbyshire Cricket League against Creswell Colliery, on 28 April 1900. After the Second World War, Chesterfield became league champions six times between the year 1947 and 1957. Riding on their success, Chesterfield moved from the Derbyshire League and joined the Bassetlaw & District Cricket League in 1958 before returning to Derbyshire in the Derbyshire Premier League in 1999. The following year, the league became an ECB accredited league, where Chesterfield became League Champions in 2008. In 2011, the club joined the Mansfield and District Cricket League with a Sunday 1st XI team, and became Section (Division) 1 Champions in 2021.

The club have three senior teams that compete on Saturdays in the Derbyshire County Cricket League, a Sunday XI in the Mansfield and District Cricket League and an established junior training section that play competitive cricket in the North Derbyshire Youth Cricket League.

== Club Performance ==
The Derbyshire County Cricket League competition results showing the club's positions in the league (by Division) since 1999.

Key
Gold	Champions
Red	Relegated
Grey	League Suspended

cont...
P	Premier League
1	Division 1
2	Division 2
3	Division 3, etc.

Derbyshire County Cricket League
Team	1999	2000	2001	2002	2003	2004	2005	2006	2007	2008	2009	2010	2011	2012	2013	2014	2015	2016	2017	2018	2019	2020	2021	2022	2023	2024	2025	2026
1st XI	P	P	P	P	P	P	P	P	P	P	P	P	P	P	P	P	P	P	P	P	P	P	P	1	1	1	P	P
2nd XI	3B	3B	3B	3C	3N	3N	3N	2N	2N	2N	4N	3	4N	4N	4N	4N	4N	4N	4N	4N	3N	3NN	3N	3N	4N	4N	3N	4N
3rd XI						7N	7N	7N	7N	6N	8N												9N	9N	10N	9N	9N	8N

The Mansfield and District Cricket League Sunday League competition results showing the club's position (by Division) since 2011.

Mansfield & District Cricket League
Team	2011	2012	2013	2014	2015	2016	2017	2018	2019	2020	2021	2022	2023	2024	2025	2026
Sunday 1st XI	6	6	6	5	5	4	3N	2N	1		1	P	P	1	1	1

== Club Honours ==
League Championships
Year	League	Division
2008	Derbyshire County Cricket League	Premier
2018	Derbyshire County Cricket League	Division 4N
2021	Mansfield & District Cricket League	Section 1
1958	Bassetlaw & District Cricket League	Division 1C
1959	Bassetlaw & District Cricket League	Division 1B
1965	Bassetlaw & District Cricket League	Division 2D
1968	Bassetlaw & District Cricket League	Division 2A
1992	Bassetlaw & District Cricket League	Division 2B
1957	Derbyshire Cricket League	Division 1
195?	Derbyshire Cricket League	Division 1
195?	Derbyshire Cricket League	Division 1
195?	Derbyshire Cricket League	Division 1
1948	Derbyshire Cricket League	Division 1
1896	Derbyshire Cricket League	Division 1

Cup wins
Year	Cup
2014	ECB National Club Cricket Championship; Group Champions
1996	ECB National Club Cricket Championship; Group Champions
1983	ECB National Club Cricket Championship; Group Champions
2012	DCCL Premier T20
2023	DCCL County T20
1983	Derbyshire Building Society Cup
1982	Derbyshire Building Society Cup
1981	Derbyshire Building Society Cup
1977	Derbyshire Building Society Cup
1996	Harry Tomlins Trophy
1995	Harry Tomlins Trophy
1981	Harry Tomlins Trophy
1980	Harry Tomlins Trophy
1978	Harry Tomlins Trophy

== Notable players ==
Some notable players that have represented club and county include:

- Kim Barnett
- Ian Blackwell
- Mike Hendrick
- Geoff Miller
- William Mycroft
- George Pope
- Ben Slater
- Ross Whiteley
- Matt Critchley
- Harry Cartwright

== Chesterfield CC on film ==
- Chesterfield CC Memories recorded by the Derbyshire Cricket Foundation 4/12/2018 #1
- Chesterfield CC Memories recorded by the Derbyshire Cricket Foundation 4/12/2018 #2
- Chesterfield CC Memories recorded by the Derbyshire Cricket Foundation 4/12/2018 #3
- Chesterfield CC Memories recorded by the Derbyshire Cricket Foundation 4/12/2018 #4
- Geoff Miller talks about his formative years in cricket. Recorded by the Derbyshire Cricket Foundation 6/2/2018
- East Midlands Today: Derbyshire take on Nottinghamshire in a county cricket match at Chesterfield 20/9/2007

== See also ==
- Club cricket
