= Listed buildings in Ticknall =

Ticknall is a civil parish in the South Derbyshire district of Derbyshire, England. It contains 66 listed buildings that are recorded in the National Heritage List for England. Of these, two are at Grade II*, the middle of the three grades, and the others are at Grade II, the lowest grade. The parish contains the village of Ticknall and the surrounding countryside. Most of the listed buildings are houses, cottages and associated structures, farmhouses and farmbuildings. In 1914 a series of pillar fountains were installed to provide a supply of fresh water to the village, and 16 of these fountains are listed. The other listed buildings include a church, the ruins of a previous church, a churchyard cross, two chapels, public houses, a terrace of almshouses, a village lock-up, a tramway arch, two lodges of Calke Abbey, a brick kiln, and a telephone kiosk.

== Key ==
| Grade | Criteria |
|---|---|
| II* | Particularly important buildings of more than special interest |
| II | Buildings of national importance and special interest |

== Buildings ==
| Name and location | Photograph | Date | Notes | Grade |
|---|---|---|---|---|
| Ruins of the old Parish Church (east); 52.81289°N 1.47976°W | | c. 1300 | The ruins of the former parish church are in the churchyard of St George's Church, and are in sandstone. They consist of the lower part of the east wall containing a three-light window with intersecting tracery, and part of the northwest wall. | II |
| Ruins of the old Parish Church (west); 52.81281°N 1.48010°W | — | c. 1300 | The ruins of the former parish church are in the churchyard of St George's Church and are in sandstone. They consist of the northwest angle of the former west tower with angle buttresses, and stand about 20 feet (6.1 m) high. Also surviving are the jamb and the first three voussoirs of a double-chamfered four-centred arched window. | II |
| Churchyard Cross; 52.81268°N 1.47995°W | | Medieval | The cross in the churchyard of St George's Church is in sandstone. It consists of three circular steps, on which is an octagonal cross base with step moulding. This surmounted by the lower part of an octagonal shaft, and a large irregular square finial with repairs in concrete and an iron band. | II |
| Knowlehill and associated buildings 52.82747°N 1.47950°W | | 17th century | The buildings, some of which are derelict, are associated with a large house which has been demolished. The remaining house is timber framed with brick nogging. The summer house is embattled, it has a curved front and ogee windows, and overlooks a terrace with a rustic grotto. The terrace walls contain niches, and there is a tunnel leading to two circular chambers with seating. | II |
| Farmhouse, Southwood House Farm; 52.78969°N 1.47015°W | | 17th century (or earlier) | The farmhouse, which was later extended, is in brick with quoins, dentilled eaves and an M-shaped tile roof. The older range at the front has two storeys and attics, three irregular bays, and a single-storey bay at the north end. In the middle bay is a bay window, and the other windows are casements, some with segmental heads. The later rear range has two storeys, and contains sash windows. In the centre is a doorway with a fluted surround, a fanlight, and a shallow canopy. | II |
| Springfield House Farmhouse; 52.80895°N 1.48203°W | — | 17th century | Originally two cottages, later combined into a farmhouse, it is mainly in red brick with some stone and timber framing. It has a dentilled band and a tile roof. There are two storeys and two bays. In the centre are two segmental-headed doorways, the right one blocked, and the left with a bracketed hood. The windows are sashes, with segmental heads in the ground floor and flat heads above. In the right gable end is exposed timber framing. | II |
| The Chequers Inn; 52.80996°N 1.48177°W | | 17th century | The public house, which has been altered, is mainly in stone, with some red brick, and partly rendered. It has a chamfered plinth, quoins, a cornice, and a tile roof. There are two storeys and an attic, and three bays. The doorway has a moulded surround and a bracketed hood mould, and the windows are casements with moulded surrounds and bracketed hood moulds. | II |
| White Cottage; 52.80642°N 1.48459°W | — | 17th century | A house, later a pair of cottages, it was extended in the 19th century. The original part has a timber framed core, the exterior is in stone and brick, partly rendered, and the roof is tiled. There are two storeys and four bays, the outer bays with dentilled eaves cornices. On the front are a porch, a doorway and casement windows. Inside the building is an inglenook fireplace. | II |
| 55 and 57 Main Street; 52.81228°N 1.47642°W | | Early 18th century | A pair of red brick houses with floor bands, a sawtooth eaves cornice, and a tile roof with coped gables and plain kneelers. There are two storeys and two bays. The left doorway has a wedge brick lintel, and the right doorway has a gabled porch. The windows, most of which are casements, have splayed wedge brick lintels. | II |
| Arch View Cottage; 52.81250°N 1.47400°W | — | Early 18th century | A house in stone and red brick with quoins and a tile roof. There are two storeys and two bays. On the north front are four horizontally-sliding sash windows and two small windows. | II |
| Pennwyche House, wall and railings 52.80935°N 1.48218°W | — | Early 18th century | The house is in rendered stone and brick on a stepped plinth, with a floor band and a tile roof. There are two storeys and three bays. Steps lead up to the doorway that has a moulded surround and a decorative openwork iron porch, and the windows are sashes. The front garden is enclosed by a low wall with iron railings. | II |
| Royal Oak House; 52.81296°N 1.46919°W | | Early 18th century | The house was extended in the early 19th century. The original part is in stone, and the extension is in red brick with a dentilled eaves cornice and a tile roof. There are two storeys and an attic, and an irregular front of three bays. The middle bay projects, it is gabled, and contains sash windows. The right bay contains a doorway and a sash window, both with a wedge brick lintel. The recessed left wing has a casement window and a 20th-century window. | II |
| Slade Farmhouse; 52.81240°N 1.47923°W | — | Early 18th century | The farmhouse is in red brick, partly rendered, with a tile roof, coped gables and plain kneelers. There are two storeys and a symmetrical front of three bays. The central doorway has pilasters and a rectangular fanlight, and the windows are sashes. At the rear is a range with a floor band, and a gabled staircase tower with a full height staircase window. | II |
| Spring Cottage; 52.80875°N 1.48238°W | | Early 18th century | The cottage was extended in the 19th century. The original part is in sandstone, the extension is in red brick, the roof is tiled, and there are the remains of a coped gable to the south. There are two storeys, the original part has two bays, and the extension has one. The doorway has a segmental brick arch, and the windows are casements, the ground floor window in the right bay with a segmental arch. | II |
| The Cottage and 39 High Street; 52.80945°N 1.48190°W | | Early 18th century | Three cottages and a shop, later two cottages, they are in red brick with floor bands, dentilled and sawtooth eaves cornices, and a tile roof. There are two storeys and six irregular bays. The left bay projects and contains a Venetian window, and the other windows are casements. The ground floor openings have segmental heads, and in the upper floor they have flat heads. | II |
| The Grange; 52.81271°N 1.48272°W | | Early 18th century | A farmhouse in red brick with some stone, with floor bands, a dentilled eaves cornice and a tile roof. There are two storeys and attics, a double range plan, and a symmetrical front of three bays. In the centre is a projecting doorcase, and the windows are casements with segmental heads. In the north front is a full height staircase window. | II |
| 26 High Street; 52.80982°N 1.48211°W | | 18th century | The house is in rendered red brick with a hipped tile roof. There are two storeys and a symmetrical front of three bays. The central doorway has reeded pilasters, a rectangular fanlight, and a bracketed hood, and the windows are horizontally-sliding sashes. | II |
| 41–45 High Street; 52.80928°N 1.48198°W | — | Mid 18th century | A terrace of red brick cottages, partly painted, with a dentilled eaves cornice and a tile roof. There are two storeys and six bays. The ground floor openings have segmental heads, and in the upper floor are casement windows with flat heads. | II |
| 47–51 High Street; 52.80906°N 1.48201°W | — | Mid 18th century | A row of red brick cottages with tile roofs. No. 47 has two storeys and a coped gable with kneelers. It contains a doorway and a window with a segmental head in the ground floor and flat-headed windows above. Nos. 49 and 51 have three storeys, a sawtooth eaves cornice, paired central doorways with segmental head, segmental-headed windows in the ground and middle floors, and flat-headed windows in the top floor. All the windows are casements. | II |
| The Old Post Office; 52.81197°N 1.47668°W | | 18th century | The post office, later used for other purposes, is in stone and red brick with a tile roof. There is a single storey and attics, the front facing the road gabled, and containing a doorway and a two-light window in the ground floor, both with segmental heads. In the upper floor is a horizontally-sliding sash window, and in the west front are similar windows, some with segmental heads, a doorway with a segmental head, and a gabled dormer. | II |
| Harpur Almshouses; 52.81248°N 1.47990°W | | 1772 | A terrace of seven almshouses in red brick with stone dressings on a chamfered plinth, with quoins, a moulded cornice, and a tile roof with stone gabled copings and plain kneelers. There are two storeys, and a symmetrical front of nine bays, the middle bay slightly projecting under a pediment containing an inscribed and dated stone panel. In the centre is a gabled porch, and the windows are cross casements under wedge brick lintels. | II |
| Derby House; 52.81249°N 1.46939°W | | Late 18th century | The house is in orange brick with a dentilled eaves cornice and a tile roof. There are three storeys, a symmetrical front of three bays, and a two-storey rear outshut. The central doorway has a moulded surround, a segmental-headed fanlight, and a bracketed hood. The windows are sashes with wedge brick lintels. | II |
| Southwood Farmhouse; 52.78762°N 1.46746°W | — | Late 18th century | The farmhouse is in red brick with a dentilled eaves cornice and a roof of Welsh slate and tile. There are two storeys and three bays. In the centre is a doorway and the windows are casements, all with segmental heads. To the left is a lean-to conservatory. | II |
| The Lock-Up; 52.81158°N 1.47992°W | | Late 18th century | The village lock-up is in red brick with sandstone dressings. It has an octagonal plan, and a south doorway with a stone lintel and jambs. At the top is a chamfered string course and an octagonal brick spire. | II* |
| Ticknall Arch; 52.81252°N 1.47324°W | | 1794 | The arch carries the Ticknall Tramway over Main Street. It is in sandstone with brick and sandstone dressings, and is lined with brick. It consists of a single segmental, almost horseshoe, arch, and has a coped parapet with a ramped centre and slightly curved retaining walls. | II |
| Entrance Lodge and Gateway, Calke Abbey; 52.81193°N 1.47339°W | | c. 1805 | The lodge at the northern entrance to the grounds is in rendered brick with a hipped Welsh slate roof. There are two storeys, and a canted end facing the drive containing sash windows. To the north is a porch, open on two sides, with round arches and impost bands, and to the east is a lower range with casement windows. Attached to the lodge is a wall, and a gateway consisting of two pedestrian round-headed arches, each with a moulded cornice. In the arches and between them are wrought iron gates. | II |
| Middle Lodge, Calke Abbey; 52.80487°N 1.47145°W | | c. 1805 | The lodge on the drive to the hall is in stone and rendered brick. It is on a plinth, and has a Doric frieze, a cornice with mutules, and a hipped Welsh slate roof. There is a single storey, a square plan, and a lower east range. On the front facing the drive is a blocked doorway and a sash window above, and in the north and south fronts are a blind round-arched panels containing a sash window. Most of the windows in the east range are casements. To the west is a broad semicircular arch with a Doric frieze and a cornice, containing wrought iron gates with openwork piers. | II* |
| Brierfield House; 52.81194°N 1.47110°W | | 1815 | A farmhouse in red brick with a dentilled eaves cornice and a tile roof. There are two storeys and a symmetrical front of three bays. The central doorway has a rectangular fanlight, and the windows, which are casements, all have brick wedge lintels. Above the middle window in the top floor is an initialled datestone. | II |
| Methodist Chapel; 52.81292°N 1.47633°W | | 1815 | The chapel is in red brick with painted stone dressings, a sawtooth eaves cornice, a Welsh slate roof, and two storeys. The entrance front has a pedimented gable containing a circular vent, bands, and three bays. In the centre is a round-arched entrance with a fanlight. The windows are small-paned with wedge brick lintels. Above the middle window in the upper floor is an inscribed and dated stone with a moulded hood mould. | II |
| Baptist Chapel; 52.81180°N 1.47717°W | — | 1817 | The former chapel is in red brick with a dentilled eaves cornice and a hipped tile roof. On the south front are three bays, each with a round-arched window, the middle one broader and taller. The entrance front contains a round-arched doorway with a Gothic fanlight. | II |
| Garden wall with bee boles, Southwood House Farm; 52.79014°N 1.46994°W | — | c. 1820 | The garden wall is in sandstone and is coped. One corner is curved and contains eleven bee boles. Each bee bole consists of a rectangular recess with brick lining, a sandstone base, and a flat lintel. | II |
| 34 and 36 High Street; 52.80920°N 1.48224°W | — | Early 19th century | A pair of cottages, one formerly a shop, in red brick on a chamfered plinth, with a dentilled eaves cornice and a tile roof. There are two storeys and four bays. The right cottage has a doorway with a segmental head, flanked by segmental-headed casement windows. The left cottage has a doorway with a reeded surround, to its right is a former shop window, and to the left is a casement window with a segmental head. The upper floor contains casement windows with flat heads. | II |
| 85 and 87 Main Street; 52.81260°N 1.47437°W | | Early 19th century | A row of four cottages, later combined into two, in red brick, with a dentilled eaves cornice and a tile roof. There are two storeys and four bays. In the ground floor are four doorways, three blocked, a former shop window, and three horizontally-sliding two-light sash windows. The top floor contains four two-light casement windows. All the openings have segmental heads. | II |
| Alcove enclosing pillar fountain 52.81012°N 1.48191°W | | Early 19th century | The alcove is in sandstone and has a round arch with pilasters and a keystone, and a flat top. Inside the half-domed interior is a pillar fountain from about 1914. The fountain is in cast iron, and consists of a fluted cylindrical column, with a moulded dome incorporating a tap lever handle. The tap outlet has a lion mask, and at the base is an integral bucket platform. | II |
| Arch Farmhouse; 52.81228°N 1.47237°W | | Early 19th century | The farmhouse is in stone and orange brick, with a sawtooth eaves cornice and a tile roof. There are two storeys and three bays. The doorway has side lights, and the windows are casements; all the openings have segmental-arched wedge brick lintels. | II |
| Archway House; 52.81274°N 1.47274°W | | Early 19th century | A pair of cottages, later combined into a house, it is in red brick with a hipped Welsh slate roof. There are two storeys and a symmetrical front of two bays. The doorways and the windows, which are sashes, have stone wedge lintels. A large extension was added to the east in 1984. | II |
| Estate Yard House; 52.81131°N 1.48078°W | — | Early 19th century | The house is in red brick with a tile roof, two storeys and three bays. To the right of the doorway is a small segmental-headed single-light window. There is one casement window, and the other windows are horizontally-sliding sash windows, those in the ground floor with segmental heads, and in the upper floor with flat heads. | II |
| Hayes Farmhouse and railings 52.81200°N 1.47578°W | | Early 19th century | The farmhouse is in rendered red brick with a tile roof, two storeys, and a symmetrical front of three bays. The central round-arched doorway has a recessed moulded surround, and a traceried fanlight, and the windows are sashes. Enclosing the front garden are iron railings. | II |
| Lime Kiln House; 52.81288°N 1.46826°W | | Early 19th century | The house is in stone and red brick on a chamfered plinth, with a dentilled eaves cornice and a tile roof. There are two storeys, a symmetrical front of three bays, and a long rear wing. Steps lead up to a central doorway with a rectangular fanlight, the windows on the front are sash windows and all the openings have wedge lintels. In the rear wing the windows are casements, those in the ground floor with segmental heads and in the upper floor with flat heads. | II |
| Sheffield House; 52.81007°N 1.48175°W | | Early 19th century | A house, part of which was a warehouse, in red brick with stone dressings on a chamfered plinth, with floor bands, and a moulded parapet, the centre part raised and decorated including the name of the house, and on the corners are ramped features with finials. There are three storeys and three bays. The doorway has a rectangular fanlight, the windows are sashes, and all the openings have channelled wedge lintels. At the rear is a lean-to containing a first floor doorway with a hoist. | II |
| Spring house, wall and water trough 52.80864°N 1.48232°W | | Early 19th century | The wall enclosing the garden of No. 42 High Street is in stone with chamfered copings. At the front, it curves to incorporate a rectangular water trough. To its left is the spring house that has a round arch with a keystone, and inside it is a half dome, and a square panel on the rear wall. | II |
| The Firs; 52.81072°N 1.48131°W | — | Early 19th century | The house is in rendered brick on a chamfered plinth, with a sill band and a hipped Welsh slate roof. There are two storeys and two bays. The central doorway has a moulded surround and a rectangular fanlight, and the windows are sashes. | II |
| The Priory; 52.81371°N 1.46440°W | — | Early 19th century | A red brick house with a dentilled eaves cornice and a hipped tile roof. There are three storeys and a symmetrical front of three bays. In the centre is a flat-roofed porch with pilasters and a parapet, and a doorway with a rectangular fanlight and a wedge brick lintel. The windows are sashes with wedge brick lintels. | II |
| The Staff of Life Public House; 52.81094°N 1.48129°W | | Early 19th century | The public house is in red brick with a sawtooth eaves cornice and a tile roof. There is a block of three storeys and three bays, and a right wing with two storeys and two bays. In the centre of the main block is a doorway with a segmental head, and there is a similar doorway in the wing. The windows are casements, with segmental heads in the lower floors, and flat heads in the top floors. | II |
| The Wheel Public House; 52.81200°N 1.47655°W | | Early 19th century | The public house is in red brick, the north front painted, with a sawtooth eaves cornice and a tile roof. There are three storeys and two bays. The doorway has a segmental head, and the windows are casements, in the ground and middle floors with segmental heads, and in the top floor with flat heads. | II |
| Top Farmhouse; 52.79917°N 1.48738°W | — | Early 19th century | The farmhouse is in red brick on a plinth, with a moulded eaves cornice and a hipped tile roof. There are two storeys and a symmetrical south front of three bays. In the centre of the front is a Tuscan Doric porch and a doorway with a traceried rectangular fanlight. The windows on the front are sashes with wedge brick lintels. At the rear is a doorway and casement windows, all with segmental heads. | II |
| 12 and 14 Stone Fronts; 52.81127°N 1.47983°W | — | c. 1840 | A pair of estate cottages, in stone on the front and red brick on the sides and rear, with a floor band, and a hipped Welsh slate roof. The windows are mullioned with chamfered surrounds and three lights, and in the ground floor they are flanked by doorways with chamfered surrounds. | II |
| 16 Stone Fronts; 52.81130°N 1.47962°W | — | c. 1840 | A pair of estate cottages, later combined into one, it is in stone on the front and red brick on the sides and rear, with a floor band, and a Welsh slate roof with two gables at the front and hipped at the rear. The gables are coped with moulded kneelers and square finials. There are two storeys and two bays. On the front are cross windows with chamfered surrounds, and the sides contain doorways and windows with segmental heads. | II |
| St George's Church; 52.81339°N 1.48016°W | | 1841–42 | The church was designed by H. I. Stevens in Perpendicular style. It is in sandstone with Welsh slate roofs, and consists of a nave, north and south aisles, a south porch, a chancel with a north vestry, and a west steeple. The steeple has a tower with four stages, moulded string courses, diagonal buttresses, a west doorway, Perpendicular windows, a clock face on the south side, and two-light bell openings. At the top are embattled parapets, and a recessed octagonal spire with two tiers of lucarnes. | II |
| Brick Kiln; 52.81418°N 1.46832°W | | Late 19th century | The brick kiln is in red brick, and has a rectangular plan with sides of 30 feet (9.1 m) and 20 feet (6.1 m). At the south end is a round arched entrance, and along the sides are eight round-arched fire holes. | II |
| Pillar fountain in front of 33 Main Street; 52.81180°N 1.47804°W | | 1914 | The pillar fountain is in cast iron, and consists of a fluted cylindrical column, with a moulded dome incorporating a tap lever handle. The tap outlet has a lion mask, and at the base is an integral bucket platform. | II |
| Pillar fountain in front of 38 Main Street; 52.81194°N 1.47717°W | | 1914 | The pillar fountain is in cast iron, and consists of a fluted cylindrical column, with a moulded dome incorporating a tap lever handle. The tap outlet has a lion mask, and at the base is an integral bucket platform. | II |
| Pillar fountain opposite 55 and 57 Main Street; 52.81213°N 1.47646°W | | 1914 | The pillar fountain is in cast iron, and consists of a fluted cylindrical column, with a moulded dome incorporating a tap lever handle. The tap outlet has a lion mask, and at the base is an integral bucket platform. | II |
| Pillar fountain west of 76 Main Street; 52.81251°N 1.47430°W | | 1914 | The pillar fountain is in cast iron, and consists of a fluted cylindrical column, with a moulded dome incorporating a tap lever handle. The tap outlet has a lion mask, and at the base is an integral bucket platform. | II |
| Pillar fountain opposite Arch Farmhouse; 52.81240°N 1.47228°W | | 1914 | The pillar fountain is in cast iron, and consists of a fluted cylindrical column, with a moulded dome incorporating a tap lever handle. The tap outlet has a lion mask, and at the base is an integral bucket platform. | II |
| Pillar fountain opposite 145 Main Street; 52.81245°N 1.47022°W | | 1914 | The pillar fountain is in cast iron, and consists of a fluted cylindrical column, with a moulded dome incorporating a tap lever handle. The tap outlet has a lion mask, and at the base is an integral bucket platform. | II |
| Pillar Fountain at the junction of Melbourne Lane and Stanton Hill; 52.81299°N 1.46597°W | | 1914 | The pillar fountain is in cast iron, and consists of a fluted cylindrical column, with a moulded dome incorporating a tap lever handle. The tap outlet has a lion mask, and at the base is an integral bucket platform. | II |
| Pillar Fountain south of Methodist Chapel; 52.81285°N 1.47618°W | | 1914 | The pillar fountain is in cast iron, and consists of a fluted cylindrical column, with a moulded dome incorporating a tap lever handle. The tap outlet has a lion mask, and at the base is an integral bucket platform. | II |
| Pillar Fountain east of Hayes Farmhouse; 52.81189°N 1.47503°W | | 1914 | The pillar fountain is in cast iron, and consists of a fluted cylindrical column, with a moulded dome incorporating a tap lever handle. The tap outlet has a lion mask, and at the base is an integral bucket platform. | II |
| Pillar fountain in front of 39 High Street; 52.80938°N 1.48197°W | | 1914 | The pillar fountain is in cast iron, and consists of a fluted cylindrical column, with a moulded dome incorporating a tap lever handle. The tap outlet has a lion mask, and at the base is an integral bucket platform. | II |
| Pillar fountain in front of 53 High Street; 52.80900°N 1.48205°W | | 1914 | The pillar fountain is in cast iron, and consists of a fluted cylindrical column, with a moulded dome incorporating a tap lever handle. The tap outlet has a lion mask, and at the base is an integral bucket platform. | II |
| Pillar Fountain in front of 24 Ashby Road; 52.80733°N 1.48316°W | | 1914 | The pillar fountain is in cast iron, and consists of a fluted cylindrical column, with a moulded dome incorporating a tap lever handle. The tap outlet has a lion mask, and at the base is an integral bucket platform. | II |
| Pillar Fountain south-east of The Green; 52.80651°N 1.48390°W | | 1914 | The pillar fountain is in cast iron, and consists of a fluted cylindrical column, with a moulded dome incorporating a tap lever handle. The tap outlet has a lion mask, and at the base is an integral bucket platform. | II |
| Pillar Fountain south of Woodbine Cottage; 52.80561°N 1.48409°W | | 1914 | The pillar fountain is in cast iron, and consists of a fluted cylindrical column, with a moulded dome incorporating a tap lever handle. The tap outlet has a lion mask, and at the base is an integral bucket platform. | II |
| Pillar Fountain adjacent to Willowbrook Cottage; 52.79953°N 1.48863°W | — | 1914 | The pillar fountain is in cast iron, and consists of a fluted cylindrical column, with a moulded dome incorporating a tap lever handle. The tap outlet has a lion mask, and at the base is an integral bucket platform. | II |
| Telephone kiosk 52.81076°N 1.48159°W | | 1935 | The K6 type telephone kiosk in High Street was designed by Giles Gilbert Scott. Constructed in cast iron with a square plan and a dome, it has three unperforated crowns in the top panels. | II |
