= Ticknall Cricket Club =

Cricket club in England

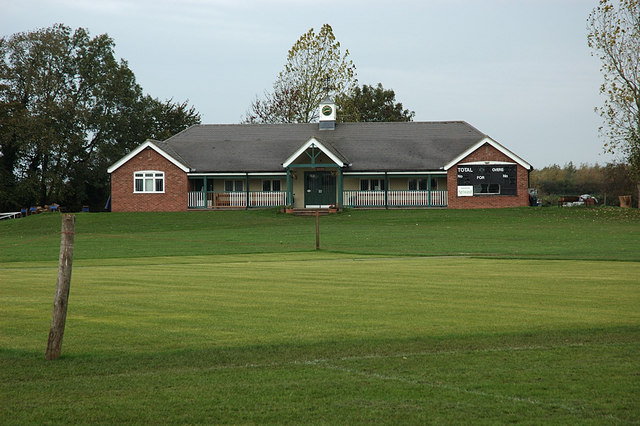
- Ticknall Cricket Pavilion (2006)
- League: Derbyshire County Cricket League

Team information
- Founded: ~1850
- Home ground: The Grange, Ticknall

History
- Prem Div wins: 1
- Div 1 wins: 2
- Official website: Ticknall Cricket Club

Ticknall Cricket Club is an amateur cricket club based in Ticknall, Derbyshire, England. The origin of the club is unknown, but it is locally believed that Ticknall's relationship with cricket began in the mid-19th century.

== Ground ==
Ticknall's main ground is the Grange, a picturesque ground on Repton Road in Ticknall, which includes a two-lane all-weather net facility. Their second ground is at the old Woodville Cricket ground, on Burton Road, Derbyshire. The 1st and 2nd XI teams use the Grange, rated by the DCCL as a Grade A+ ground, and the 3rd XI use the Woodville ground, rated as a Grade C ground by the DCCL.

== History ==
It is not known when the club was established, but local knowledge believe it to be around 1850. The earliest known cricket ground used by Ticknell was in the field adjacent to the current ground on Repton Road. One of the earliest records show Ticknall winning the Burton and District Cricket League in 1910. The club moved to their current ground, the Grange, in 1921. After a break during the Second World War, the club resumed activity playing friendly matches, until catastrophe hit the club when their wooden pavilion was destroyed by fire at the beginning of the cricket season in 1968. The club had no option but to use the garage next to the church as a changing room, and host teas in the local pub. The club entered the Derby and District Cricket League in 1971 and by the early 1980s, Ticknall fielded their first junior team, establishing the birth of a successful junior section that thrives today. It was during this time that the club was then able to field a second XI team, enabling the club to join the Central Derbyshire League in 1984, winning the league championship in 1987. In 1992, the club joined the Derbyshire County Cricket League, where it still plays today. The ground, overlooked by the village church, and graced with a new pavilion, built in 2000, is considered by many as one of the prettiest grounds in Derbyshire.

The Club currently fields three senior teams in the Derbyshire County Cricket League, a Friendly XI team, and a long-established junior section that competes cricket in the South Derbyshire Development Group.

== Club Performance ==
The Derbyshire County Cricket League competition results showing the club's positions in the league (by Division) since 1999.

Key
Gold	Champions
Red	Relegated
Grey	League suspended

cont...
P	ECB Premier League
1	Division 1
2	Division 2
3	Division 3, etc.

cont...
N	North
S	South
W	West

Derbyshire County Cricket League
Team	1999	2000	2001	2002	2003	2004	2005	2006	2007	2008	2009	2010	2011	2012	2013	2014	2015	2016	2017	2018	2019	2020	2021	2022	2023	2024	2025	2026
1st XI	2	1	1	2	1	1	1	1	1	P	1	1	P	P	P	P	P	P	P	P	P	PS	P	P	P	1	P	P
2nd XI	4A	4A	4B	4A	4S	3S	3S	3S	3S	3S	4S	4S	4S	4S	4S	4S	4S	3	3	3	3S	4SN	4S	4S	4S	4S	4S	4S
3rd XI	5B	5A	5B	5A	6S	6S	6S	6S	7S	6S	7S	7S	7S	7S	8S	8S	7S	7S	7S	7S	7S	7SS	7S	7S	7S	8S	9S	9S
4th XI				5C	7S	7S	7S	7S	7W	7S	9S	9S	9S	10S	10S	10S	9S	10S	10S									

== Club Honours ==
DCCL Premier League
Champions	2018

Derbyshire County Cricket League
Division 1	Champions	1987, 2007, 2010
Division 2	Champions	2002
Division 4	Champions	2002, (Note: Division 4A.) 2003, (Note: Division 4S.) 2020 (Note: Division 4 (South-North).) (Note: No relegations or promotions due to league restrictions by the Coronavirus pandemic.)

DCCL - Cup Competitions
Winners	Premier Cup	2015, 2018
Winners	Premier T20 Finals Day	2015
Winners	Harry Lund Cup	2001, 2002, 2007
Winners	Marston's Smooth Trophy	2007
Winners	XXXX Trophy	2007

== Ticknall CC on film ==
- Derbyshire Cricket Foundation: Aidan Melen and John Dumelow talk about their involvement with Ticknall Cricket Club.
- Derbyshire Cricket Foundation: Paul Borrington and Andrew Butler discuss their cricketing memories.
- Ockbrook & Borrowash 1xi v Ticknall 1xi - DCCL Premier Division - 17.06.2017
- Joss Morgan hits 150 in the Derbyshire Cup Final for Ticknall Cricket Club

== Notable players ==
- Paul Borrington
- Wayne Madsen
- Tony Palladino
- Tom Taylor
- Mark Turner
- Thomas Wood

== See also ==
- Club cricket
