= Sandiacre Town Cricket Club =

English Cricket Club, based in Derbyshire

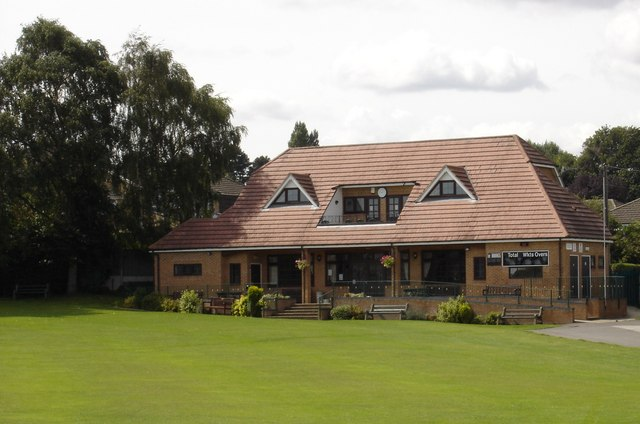
- Sandiacre Town Cricket Club (2008)
- League: Derbyshire County Cricket League

Team information
- Founded: 1877
- Home ground: Longmoor Lane, Sandiacre

History
- Premier wins: 6
- Div 1 wins: 0
- Div 2 wins: 2
- Official website: Sandiacre Town Cricket Club

Sandiacre Town Cricket Club is an amateur cricket club based in Sandiacre, Derbyshire, England. The club was established in 1877 and has won the ECB National Club Cricket Championship on 2 occasions: 2003 and 2014. The club currently play in the Derbyshire Premier Cricket League being Champions in 2002, 2004, 2012, 2015, 2017 and 2021.

== Ground ==
The club has played at Longmoor Lane, Sandiacre, since around 1890. The current pavilion was built in 2002 with the aid of a National Lottery grant. The 1st and 2nd XI teams use the Longmoor Lane pitch, rated by the DCCL as a Grade A+ ground, and the 3rd XI and Junior teams use Breaston CC's old ground, located south of Risley, Derbyshire, which is rated as a Grade B ground.

== History ==
History of cricket in Sandiacre dates back to the early nineteenth century, where a match report was recorded between Sandiacre and Stapleford in the Nottingham Review on 4 November 1814, which Sandiacre won. It's uncertain as to where the original home ground was, but the earliest clue was published in the Nottingham Review in 1838 stating that the ground was in a field near the Plough Inn. Sometime between 1877 - 1900, the club moved to rented farmland on Longmoor Lane. By 1921, the earliest reference to 'Sandiacre Town' appeared, possibly to help differentiate the club from neighbouring rivals using Sandiacre in their team names. After raising money from collecting door to door throughout Sandiacre and with help from the National Playing Field's Association, the club managed to buy the Ground on Longmoor Lane in 1956, three years after joining the Nott's Amateur League. After a century of eventful cricketing memories, the old pavilion was eventually replaced by the current pavilion in 2002, which was formally opened by Ian Botham and Ravi Bopara in 2003.

The Club currently has 3 senior teams competing in the Derbyshire County Cricket League, a Sunday league team in the Newark Club Cricket Alliance league and a long established junior training section that play competitive cricket in the Erewash Young Cricketers League.

== Club Performance ==
The Derbyshire County Cricket League competition results showing the club's positions in the league (by Division) since 2001.

Key
Gold	Champions
Red	Relegated
Grey	League Suspended

cont...
P	ECB Premier League
1	Division 1
2	Division 2
3	Division 3, etc.

cont...
N	North
S	South
E	East
C	Central

Derbyshire County Cricket League
Team	2001	2002	2003	2004	2005	2006	2007	2008	2009	2010	2011	2012	2013	2014	2015	2016	2017	2018	2019	2020	2021	2022	2023	2024	2025	2026
1st XI	P	P	P	P	P	P	P	P	P	P	P	P	P	P	P	P	P	P	P	P	P	P	P	P	P	P
2nd XI	2	2	2	2	2	2S	2S	2S	3	2	2	2	2	2	2	2	2	2	2	2N	2	2	2	2	2	2
3rd XI	4E	4E	6S	5S	5S	5S	5S	6C	7N	7N	6N	5N	5N	5N	5N	5S	4S	5S	5S	6SN	6S	6S	5S	5N	5N	5S
4th XI				7C	7C	7C	7E																10C	9N	9C	9C

The Newark Club Cricket Alliance Sunday League competition results showing the club's position (by Division) since 2011.

Newark Club Cricket Alliance
Team	2011	2012	2013	2014	2015	2016	2017	2018	2019	2020	2021	2022	2023
Sunday 1st XI	6		6	6	6	5	4	3	4	4	3	4	
Sunday 2nd XI				7									

== Club Honours ==
League Championships
Year	League	Division
2002	Derbyshire County Cricket League	Premier
2004	Derbyshire County Cricket League	Premier
2012	Derbyshire County Cricket League	Premier
2015	Derbyshire County Cricket League	Premier
2017	Derbyshire County Cricket League	Premier
2021	Derbyshire County Cricket League	Premier
2000	Derbyshire County Cricket League	Division 2
2021	Derbyshire County Cricket League	Division 2
1999	Derbyshire County Cricket League	Division 3A
2002	Derbyshire County Cricket League	Division 4E
2000	Derbyshire County Cricket League	Division 5B
2001	Derbyshire County Cricket League	Division 5A
2003	Derbyshire County Cricket League	Division 6S
2022	Derbyshire County Cricket League	Division 6S
2015	Newark Club Cricket Alliance League	Division 6
1991	Nott's Alliance Premier League	Division 1
1955	Premier Nott's Amateur Cricket League	Division 1
1958	Premier Nott's Amateur Cricket League	Division 1
1964	Premier Nott's Amateur Cricket League	Division 1
1990	Premier Nott's Amateur Cricket League	Division 2
1898	Sandiacre and Ilkeston District League	Division 1
1904	Sandiacre and Ilkeston District League	Division 1
1906	Sandiacre and Ilkeston District League	Division 1

Cup wins
Year	Cup
2003 (Note: Lord's ground.)	ECB National Club Cricket Championship; Club Cricket Championship Cup
2014 (Note: Bath CC ground.)	ECB National Club Cricket Championship; Royal London Club Championship Cup
2002	DCCL Premier Cup
2012	DCCL Premier Cup
2014	DCCL Premier Cup
2016	DCCL Premier Cup
2017	DCCL Premier Cup
2013	DCCL Premier T20 Finals Day
2023	DCCL Premier T20 Finals Day
2008	DCCL James Harwood Cup
2000	DCCL Harry Lund Cup
1991	Mayor of Derby Charity Cup Competition, OJ Jackson Cup
1992	Mayor of Derby Charity Cup Competition, OJ Jackson Cup
1993	Mayor of Derby Charity Cup Competition, OJ Jackson Cup
2004	Mayor of Derby Charity Cup Competition, OJ Jackson Cup
2006	Mayor of Derby Charity Cup Competition, OJ Jackson Cup
2020	Mayor of Derby Charity Cup Competition, OJ Jackson Cup
2021	Mayor of Derby Charity Cup Competition, OJ Jackson Cup
2022	Mayor of Derby Charity Cup Competition, OJ Jackson Cup
2021	Butterley Cup
1993	Alliance Premier Cup
1974	Derbyshire Cup
1968	Poyser Cup
1955	Popkess Cup
1959	Popkess Cup
1990	Premier Nott's Evening League Trophy
1991	Premier Nott's Evening League Trophy
1992	Premier Nott's Evening League Trophy
1993	Premier Nott's Evening League Trophy

== See also ==
- Club cricket
