= St George's Church, Ticknall =

St George’s Church, Ticknall
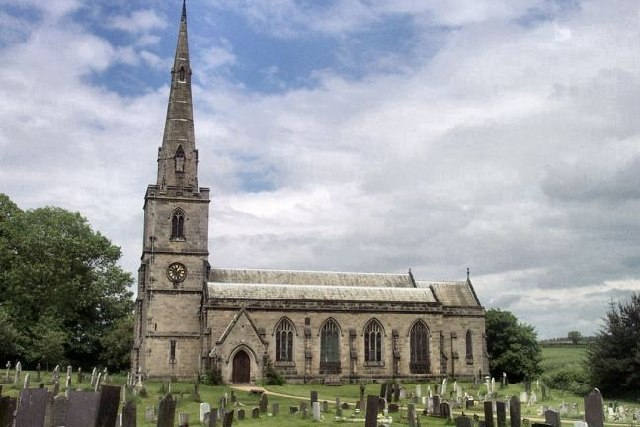
- St George’s Church, Ticknall
- St George’s Church, Ticknall
- 52°48′48.1″N 1°28′48.8″W
- Location: Ticknall
- Country: England
- Denomination: Church of England

History
- Dedication: St George
- Consecrated: 6 October 1842

Architecture
- Heritage designation: Grade II listed
- Architect: Henry Isaac Stevens
- Construction cost: £4,500

Specifications
- Capacity: 700 persons

Administration
- Diocese: Diocese of Derby
- Archdeaconry: Derby
- Deanery: Melbourne
- Parish: Ticknall

St George's Church, Ticknall is a Grade II listed parish church in the Church of England in Ticknall, Derbyshire.

== History ==
The church was built in 1842 by the architect Henry Isaac Stevens to replace the old church dedicated to St Thomas Becket. It was consecrated by the Bishop of Hereford Rt Revd Thomas Musgrave on 6 October 1842.

== Parish status ==
The church is in a joint parish with:

- St Michael with St Mary's Church, Melbourne
- St James' Church, Smisby
- St Michael's Church, Stanton by Bridge

== Organ ==
The church contains a pipe organ by J.W. Walker dating from 1869. A specification of the organ can be found on the National Pipe Organ Register.

== See also ==
- Listed buildings in Ticknall
