= Ted Moult =

British television personality

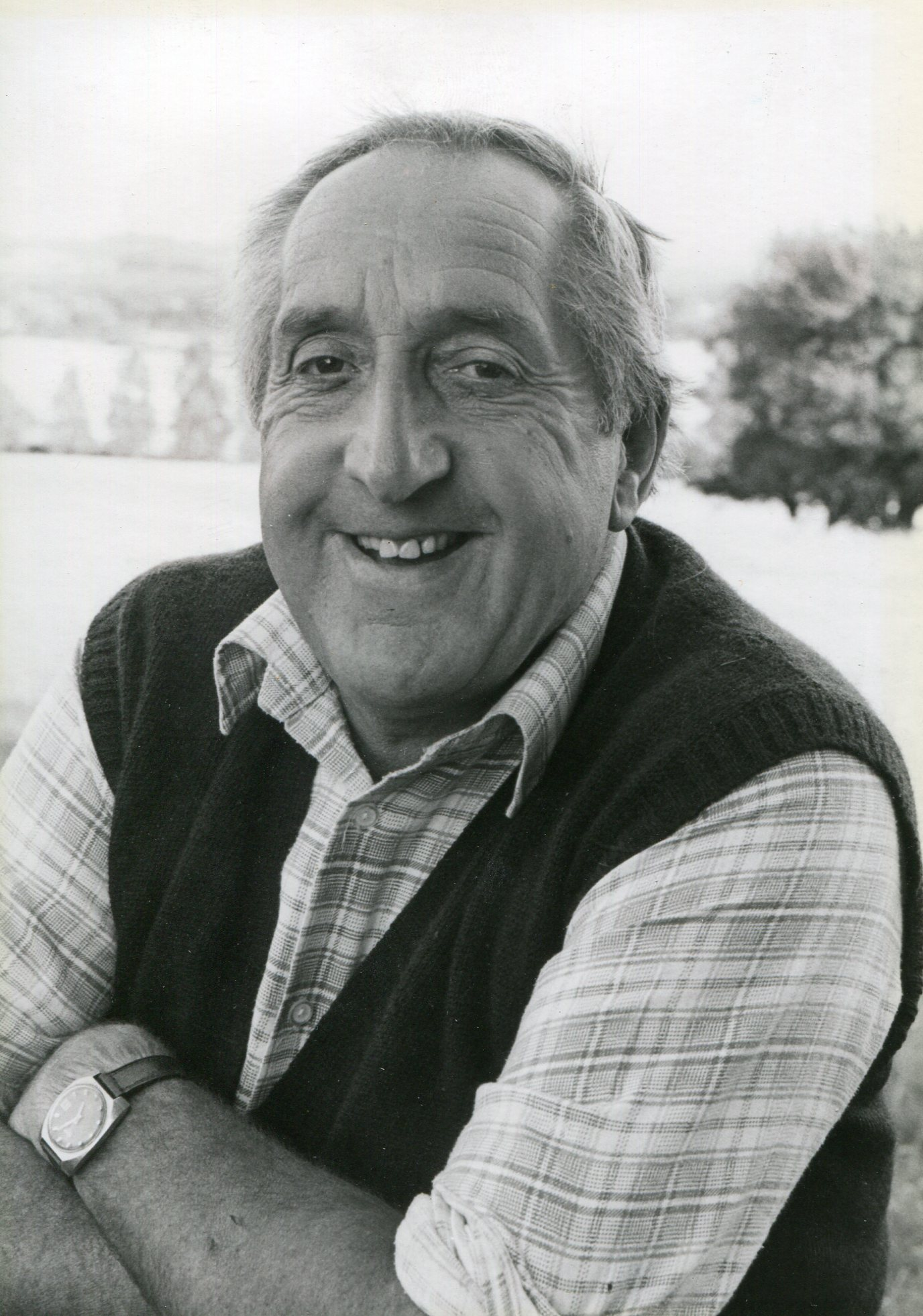
- Moult in 1984
- Born: Edward Walker Moult; 11 February 1926; Derby, England
- Died: 3 September 1986 (aged 60)
- Years active: 1948–1986

Edward Walker Moult (11 February 1926 – 3 September 1986) was a British farmer at Scaddows Farm near Ticknall, Derbyshire, who became a radio and television personality.

== Early life ==
Moult was born on 11 February 1926 in Derby. He left Derby School at 17 in 1944, and by age 22 had his first dairy farm in Sinfin, on the outskirts of the city. He has been credited with the concept of "pick-your-own" strawberries at his farm: he began in 1961, and always made a point of greeting his customers.

== Career ==
Moult first came to public attention in the 1950s on BBC Radio's general knowledge quiz Brain of Britain, though he was knocked out in the first round. He consolidated his fame with appearances on discussion programmes such as Any Questions? and panel games such as Ask Me Another, and was a household name by the mid-1960s. The presenter Franklin Engelmann gave him the nickname Ticknall Ted. In December 1959, he was the week's castaway on BBC Radio 4's Desert Island Discs; his chosen favourite record, book and luxury item were Beethoven's "Symphony No 6 in F Major (Opus 68)", Charles Dickens' The Pickwick Papers and some drawing equipment respectively. He was the subject of This Is Your Life in February 1964 when he was surprised by Eamonn Andrews at the BBC Television Theatre.

He appeared in six episodes of What's My Line? in 1958 as a panellist. Other TV appearances includeThe Sooty Show in 1984; Bullshot Crummond in 1984; Scarf Jack in 1981; Target in 1978; Blankety Blank in 1979; An Audience with Kenneth Williams in 1983; Milk for all It's Worth documentary in 1982; Connections in 1982; Calendar Countdown in 1982; Punchlines! in 1981; It's a Knockout in 1981; An Audience with Dame Edna Everage in 1981; Country Game in 1976–1979; M'Lords... Ladies and Gentlemen... in 1978; Whodunnit? in 1978; Television Club in 1978; Celebrity Squares in 1976–1977; Parkinson 1974; A Question of News in 1971; Play School in 1964–1971 as the Story Teller; Ev in 1971; Call My Bluff in 1966–1979; Farming documentary as the presenter 1959–1969; Quiz Ball and Know Your Onions in 1966; The Eamonn Andrews Show in 1965; and Laugh Line in 1960.

He appeared in the opening edition of Channel 4's first show Countdown and had a number of small cameo roles in films and television, playing Harold Carter, the love interest of the housekeeper Mrs Hall in a 1980 episode of the TV series All Creatures Great and Small.

In 1983, Moult appeared on the third series of Bullseye as a celebrity guest throwing darts for charity. He threw 9 darts scoring a total 180, winning £180 for the contestants' chosen charity. He played the part of Bill Insley in the Radio 4 soap opera The Archers from 1983 to 1986.

The band Half Man Half Biscuit recorded a track called "Do Y'Ken Ted Moult?" on their second album.

=== Advertising ===
In 1976, he appeared on the advert for Jacob's Cream Crackers a popular hit throughout Great Britain and Ireland. Moult was the frontman for a series of adverts for Everest Double Glazing in the 1980s, featuring the selling line: "You only fit double glazing once, so fit the best: Everest."

== Death ==
Moult died by suicide by gunshot in 1986 after a period of depression after several weeks of wet weather that worried arable farmers. After a private funeral, his life was celebrated at a public ceremony in Derby Cathedral. He is buried at Ticknall churchyard. He was survived by his wife Marie Rose (Maria) (1932–2014), and children.

== Books ==
- Down to Earth: The Life and Views of Ted Moult (Autobiography) ISBN 0-901482-18-8
