= Swarkestone Cricket Club =

English cricket club, based in Derbyshire

- League: Derbyshire County Cricket League

Team information
- Founded: 1898
- Home ground: Barrow Turn in Swarkestone

History
- Derbyshire County Cricket League Championship wins: 4
- Official website: swarkestone.play-cricket.com

Swarkestone Cricket Club is a cricket club based in Swarkestone, 5 miles south of Derby, and has a history dating back to the early 20th century.

== Ground ==
The home ground is located at Barrow Turn in Swarkestone, Derbyshire and has 2 all-weather net facilities. The 1st and 2nd XI teams use Barrow Turn, rated by the DCCL as a Grade A+ ground, and the 3rd XI have access to the Aston-on-Trent Cricket Club ground off Shardlow Road, rated a Grade A ground.

== History ==
The Derbyshire County Cricket League identifies the club to have been established in 1898, originally playing at Ingleby before locating to Swarkestone in the 1930s. By 1990, the club joined Derbyshire County Cricket League. The 1st XI team entered the Derbyshire Premier Division in 2012, and finished 2nd in the club's first ever year in the top flight of the Derbyshire League. Since then, the Club has won the Derbyshire County League Championship four times: 2013, 2016, 2022 & 2023.

The club currently has four senior teams competing in the Derbyshire County Cricket League and a junior training section that play competitive cricket in the South Derbyshire Development Group.

== Club Performance ==
The Derbyshire County Cricket League competition results showing the club's positions in the league (by Division) since 2002.

Key
Gold	Champions
Red	Relegated
Grey	League Suspended

Key
P	ECB Premier Division
1	Division One
2	Division Two, etc.

Derbyshire County Cricket League
Team	2002	2003	2004	2005	2006	2007	2008	2009	2010	2011	2012	2013	2014	2015	2016	2017	2018	2019	2020	2021	2022	2023	2024	2025	2026
1st XI	3A	3S	2	1	1	1	1	1	1	1	P	P	P	P	P	P	P	P	PS	P	P	P	P	P	P
2nd XI	4B	5S	5S	5S	4S	4S	3S	5S	5S	4S	4S	4S	3	4S	4S	4S	3	3S	4SN	4S	4S	3S	2	2	2
3rd XI	5A	7S	7S	7S	7S	6S	7W	9S	9S	9S	9S	9S	8S	7S	6S	6S	6S	6S	6SN	6S	6S	7S	6S	6S	5S
4th XI																							10E	9S	9S

== Club Honours ==
Derbyshire County Cricket League Division Champions
Division	Year(s)
ECB Premier	2013, 2016, 2022, 2023
Division 2	2004
Division 3	2003, (Note: Division 3 (South).) 2023
Division 4	2013, (Note: Division 4 (South).) 2022
Division 7	2023 (Note: Division 7 (South).)
Division 9	2013 (Note: Division 9 (South).)
Division 10	2024 (Note: Division 10 (East).)

DCCL - Cup Competitions
Result	Cup	Year
Winners	Premier Cup	2019
Winners	Marston's Smooth Trophy	2006, 2011
Winners	Harry Lund Cup	2011
Winners	County T20 Finals Day	2011

Mayor of Derby Charity Cup Competitions
Result	Cup	Year
Winners	OJ Jackson Cup	2023

== See also ==
- Club cricket
