= Queen's Park, Chesterfield =

Cricket ground

Coordinates: 53°13′58″N 1°25′57″W

Queen's Park
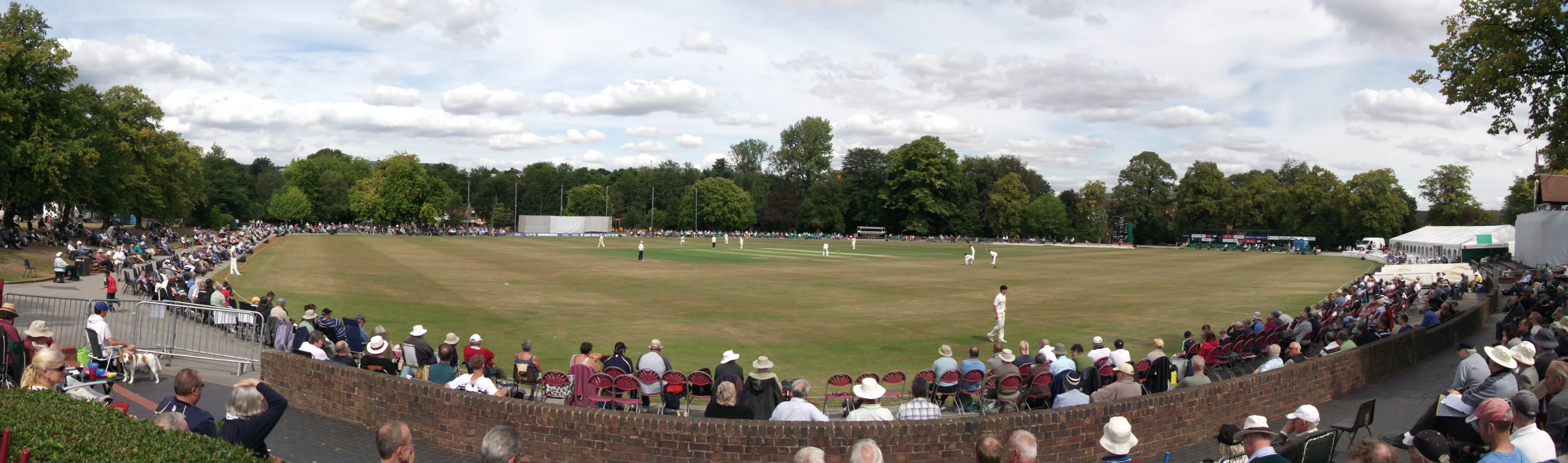

Ground information
- Location: Chesterfield
- Country: England
- Establishment: 1898
- Capacity: 7,000
- End names
- Lake End; Pavilion End

International information
- First WODI: 30 June 1973: International XI v New Zealand
- Last WODI: 2 July 2011: Australia v India

Team information
Derbyshire	(1898–1998, 2006–present)
- As of 6 September 2020; Source: Cricinfo

Queen's Park is a county cricket ground located in Chesterfield, Derbyshire, England and lies within a park in the centre of the town established for the Golden Jubilee of Queen Victoria in 1887. It has a small pavilion and is surrounded by mature trees.

The park is the home of Chesterfield CC and also played home to Derbyshire CCC for 100 years between 1898 and 1998, before the county team returned in 2006 after an 8-year absence. It was at one time surrounded by a banked cycle track. It is a small ground and slow to dry after rain, which can provide a green wicket. The size of the ground however, lends itself to rapid scoring on good wickets.

== History ==
In 1886, the then Mayor of Chesterfield proposed that a public park be created to mark Queen Victoria's upcoming golden jubilee in 1887. However, it took the Local Government Board a further six years to agree on costs and the park was eventually opened to the public on 2 August 1893. Chesterfield Cricket Club was granted exclusive use of the ground in February 1894, and the first game was played there on 5 May 1894.

There was an unusual incident during the County Championship match between Derbyshire and Yorkshire in mid-1946. After two overs were bowled in the Derbyshire first innings, Yorkshire captain Len Hutton asked for the length of the pitch to be measured. It was found to be 24 yards long, instead of the regulation 22 yards. The pitch was correctly reset, and the game continued.

== The return of county cricket ==
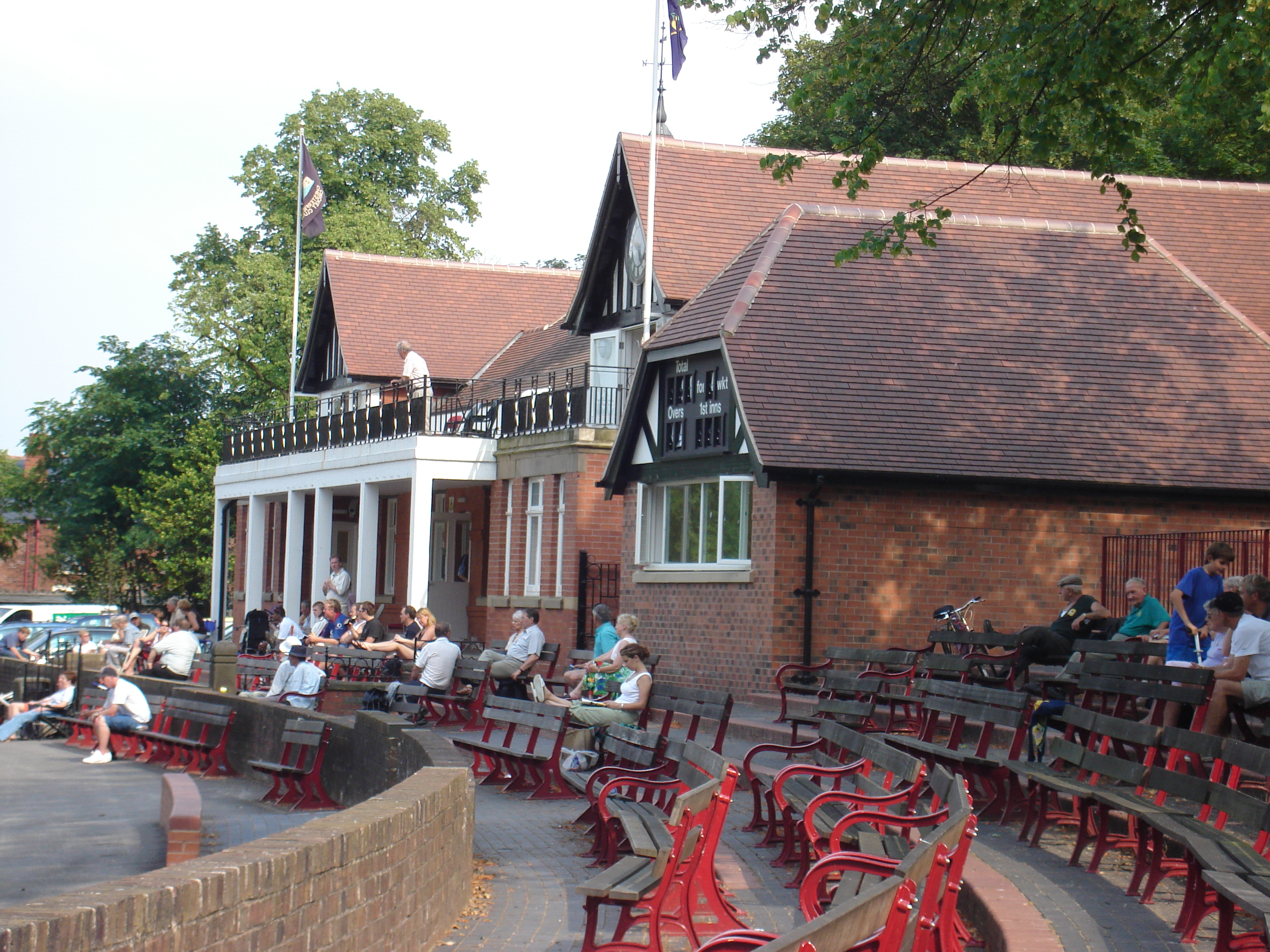
The pavilion

After a century of first-class cricket at Chesterfield between 1898 and 1998, the next seven seasons saw Derbyshire play no first-class or List A matches on the ground, although the Marylebone Cricket Club played a first class match against the touring Sri Lanka team in 2002.

However, following a multimillion-pound refurbishment and upgrade of the entire park including the cricketing facilities, Derbyshire returned by taking on Worcestershire in a County Championship Division Two game between 26 and 29 July. The game ended in a draw, with Australian Marcus North avoiding defeat for the home side by scoring 161 runs, including 24 boundaries. Attendances for all four days was high, and saw Derbyshire announce a four-year deal to play County Cricket at the ground soon after the game.

The Sunday then saw a visit from a star-studded Surrey Brown Caps side and despite a heavy loss, a large crowd were treated to some entertainment by Surrey batsman Ali Brown who scored 106 from just 68 deliveries.

== 2007 festival ==
The 2007 festival was scheduled to run from 25 to 29 July and would have consisted of a four-day County Championship game against Somerset and the Pro40 opener against Kent. Both of these matches were moved to Derbyshire's regular ground in Derby due to the Queen's Park ground being waterlogged. Instead, the festival began with the Pro40 game against Durham on 4 September and saw Durham win convincingly by seven wickets. The festival continued with the County Championship game against Nottinghamshire from 6 to 9 September, where Nottinghamshire won by an innings and six runs inside three days. Nottinghamshire skipper Stephen Fleming helped the visitors to the win, scoring 243 runs, including 40 fours.

== First-class records at Queen's Park ==
=== Notation ===
Team notation

- 300-3 indicates that a team scored 300 runs for three wickets and the innings was closed, either due to a successful run chase or if no playing time remained.
- 300-3d indicates that a team scored 300 runs for three wickets, and declared its innings closed.
- 300 indicates that a team scored 300 runs and was all out.

Batting notation

- 100 indicates that a batsman scored 100 runs and was out.
- 100* indicates that a batsman scored 100 runs and was not out.
- 100* against a partnership means that the two batsmen added 100 runs to the team's total, and neither of them was out.

Bowling notation

- 5-100 indicates that a bowler captured 5 wickets while conceding 100 runs.

=== Team scoring records ===
Most runs in an innings
Runs	Teams	Season
662	Yorkshire (v. Derbyshire)	1898
617-5d	Yorkshire (v. Derbyshire)	2013
Source: CricketArchive.com. Last updated: 25 April 2020.

Fewest runs in a completed innings
Runs	Teams	Season
29	Middlesex (v. Derbyshire)	1957
30	Derbyshire (v. Nottinghamshire)	1913
Source: CricketArchive.com. Last updated: 6 October 2008.

=== Batting records ===
Highest individual score
Runs	Player	Opponent	Season
343*	Percy Perrin (Essex)	v. Derbyshire	1904
Source: CricketArchive.com. Last updated: 6 October 2008.

Highest partnership
Runs	Team	Players		Opposition	Season
554 (1st wicket)	Yorkshire	Jack Brown (300)	John Tunnicliffe (243)	v. Derbyshire	1898
Source: CricketArchive.com. Last updated: 6 October 2008.

=== Bowling records ===
Best figures in an innings
Bowling	Player	Opponent	Season
10-66	Ken Graveney (Gloucestershire)	v. Derbyshire	1949
Source: CricketArchive.com. Last updated: 6 October 2008.

Best figures in a match
Bowling	Player	Opponent	Season
14-48	Archibald Slater (Derbyshire)	v. Somerset	1930
Source: CricketArchive.com. Last updated: 6 October 2008.

- Highest attendance – 14,000 v. Yorkshire, 1948
