= Ockbrook & Borrowash Cricket Club =

Amateur cricket club in Derbyshire, England

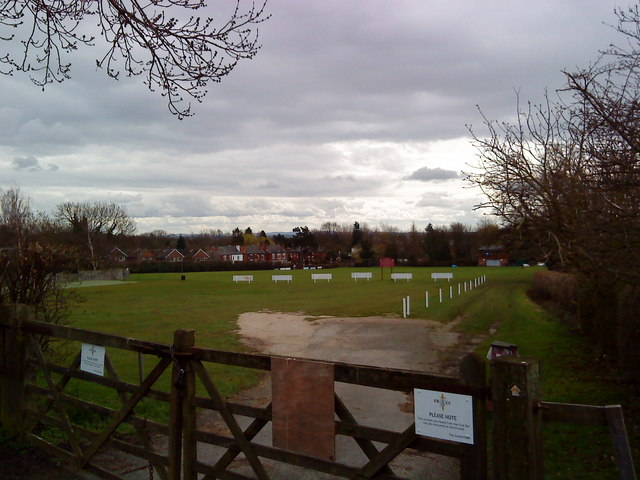
- The Arthur Honeybun Cricket Ground (2010)
- League: Derbyshire County Cricket League

Team information
- Colors: Gold and Maroon
- Founded: 1850
- Home ground: The Arthur Honeybun Cricket Ground

History
- Prem Div wins: 7
- Div 1 wins: 4
- Official website: Ockbrook & Borrowash Cricket Club

Ockbrook & Borrowash Cricket Club is an amateur cricket club based in Ockbrook, Derbyshire, England. The club has a history dating back to the mid 19th century.

== Ground ==
The home ground is located on Victoria Avenue in Ockbrook, Derbyshire and has two pitches, an all-weather pitch and a two lane, all-weather net facility. The 1st and 2nd XI teams use the Victoria Avenue pitch, rated by the DCCL as a Grade A+ ground, and the 3rd and 4th XI use the pitch in the field behind the pavilion, rated as a Grade A ground.

== History ==
History of cricket in the village of Ockbrook dates back to the mid nineteenth century, where a match report was recorded between Ockbrook and "Sawley Club" in the Derby and Chesterfield Reporter on 27 October 1843. However, the official club records state the establishment of Ockbrook & Borrowash CC to be 1850. It is not clear where the original club ground was, but by 1898, the club acquired the use of the present ground on land adjoining the Queens Head off Victoria Avenue, the same year the club joined the Sandiacre and Ilkeston District league. During the 1950s and 60s, concerted efforts were made to improve the ground facilities and the image and fortunes of the club began to steadily improve. The club won the Butterly Cup in 1972, its first trophy for many years. Shortly afterwards, the club entered the Derby and District League, doing well enough to enter Division 1 in 1974, and becoming Div 1 runner-up and League Cup winners in 1974; Div 1 winners in 1975; Div 1 winners and League cup runner-up in 1976. In the early 1980s the old pavilion was damaged by fire, resulting in a new pavilion opening in 1985. In 1999, Ockbrook & Borrowash CC became the first champions of the newly formed Premier Division of the Derbyshire County Cricket League. After subsequent improvements to the ground, gaining a Grade A rating, the adjoining ground behind the pavilion was added in 2002. The pavilion was extended in 2004, followed by the addition of a scorebox in 2008.

The club currently has 4 senior teams competing in the Derbyshire County Cricket League and a junior training section that play competitive cricket in the Erewash Young Cricketers League.

== Club performance ==
The Derbyshire County Cricket League competition results showing the club's positions in the league (by Division) since 1999.

Key		Key		Key	
Gold	Champions	P	ECB Premier League	N	North
Red	Relegated	1	Division 1	S	South
Grey	League suspended	2	Division 2, etc.	E	East

Derbyshire County Cricket League
Team	1999	2000	2001	2002	2003	2004	2005	2006	2007	2008	2009	2010	2011	2012	2013	2014	2015	2016	2017	2018	2019	2020	2021	2022	2023	2024	2025	2026
1st XI	P	P	P	P	P	P	P	P	P	P	P	P	P	P	P	P	P	P	P	P	P	P	P	P	P	P	P	P
2nd XI	2	2	2	2	2	2	2	2S	2S	2S	2	2	3	2	2	2	2	2	2	2	2	2S	2	2	2	2	2	2
3rd XI	4C	4B	4B	4A	4S	4S	4S	4S	4S	4S	5S	6S	6S	6S	6S	5S	5S	5S	5S	6S	5S	5SN	5N	5S	4S	5S	4S	5S
4th XI	5A	5A	5A	4E	6S	6S	6S	6S	6C	6C	7N	7N	8N	8N	8N	8N	8S	8S	8S	8N	8N	8NS	8N	8S	7S	8S	9C	10C

Mansfield and District Cricket League
Team	2013	2014	2015	2016
Sunday 1st XI	3	3	3	

== Club honours ==
Derbyshire County Cricket League
Premier	Champions	1999, 2005, 2006, 2009, 2011, 2014
Division 1	Champions	1975, 1987, 1991, 1995, 1998
Division 2	Champions	2020 (Note: Division 2 (South).) (Note: No relegations or promotions due to league restrictions by the Coronavirus pandemic.)
Division 3	Champions	2011
Division 4	Champions	1984, 2001 (Note: Division 4B.)
Division 5	Champions	1981, 2022
Division 7	Champions	1977, 2001
Division 8	Champions	2020, (Note: Division 8 (North-South).) 2022

DCCL - Cup Competitions
Winners	Premier Cup	2005, 2006, 2007, 2008, 2013, 2025
Winners	Premier T20 Finals Day	2009, 2014
Winners	James Harwood Cup	2013, 2021
Winners	Wright Cup	1979, 2003
Winners	Silver Link Trophy	1986, 1987, 1995
Winners	Bayley Cup	1984, 1986, 1988, 1989, 1991
Winners	Cresswell Cup	1981

Mayor of Derby Charity Cup Competitions: Winners / OJ Jackson Cup / 2002, 2003, 2012, 2025; Winners / Butterley Cup / 1972, 2002, 2004	Derby and District League: Division 1 / Champions / 1975, 1976	DDL - Cup Competitions: Winners / DDL Cup / 1974

== Events on film ==
- "17 year old Gary Ballance playing for Derbyshire club side Ockbrook and Borrowash in the national T20 cup."
- "Ben De Vos Interview During the 3rd Team T20 Semi-Final 17th July 2016 by Matt Cassar"
- "Josh Clark Interview after the OBCC T20 Final 2016 by Matt Cassar"
- "George Morgan Interview after the OBCC T20 Final 2016 by Matt Cassar"

== See also ==
- Club cricket
