= Ticknall Tramway =

Tram line in Derbyshire, England

Coordinates: 52.81015°N 1.47304°W

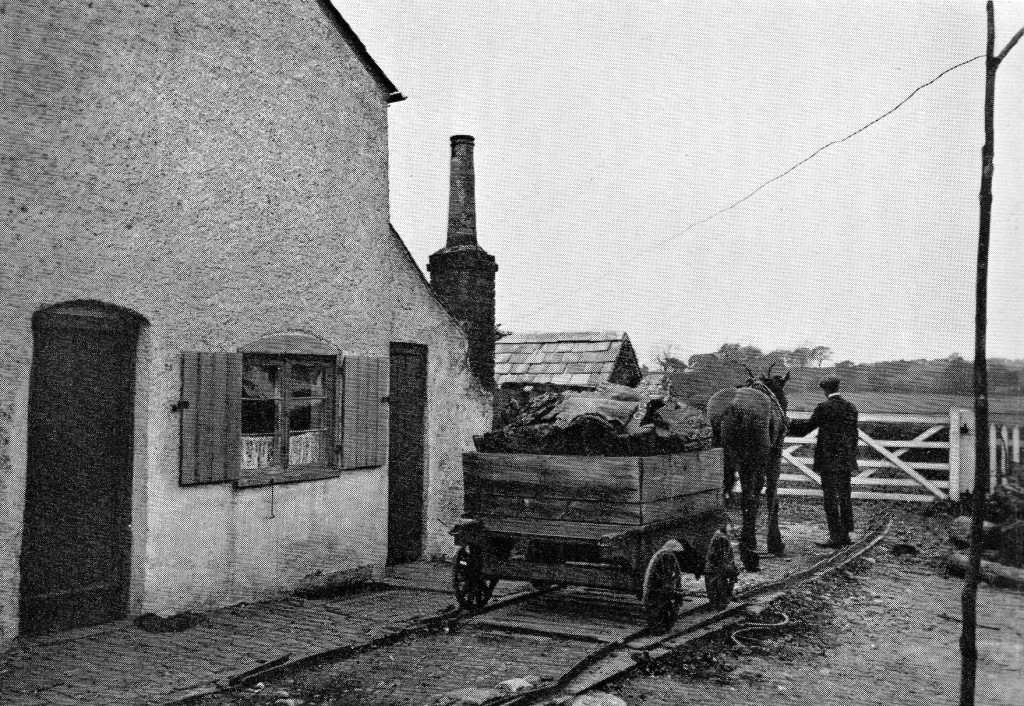

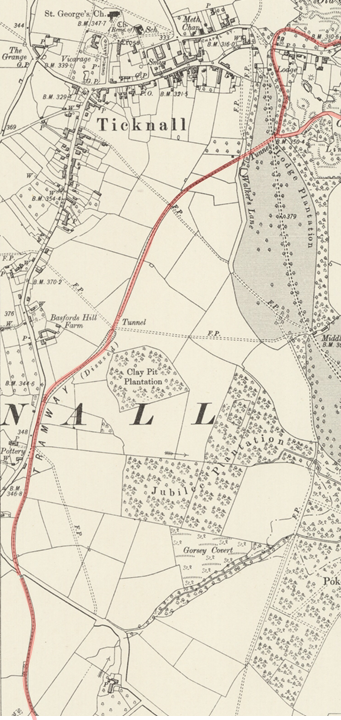
- Route near Ticknall

Technical
- Line length: 12 miles 67 chains (20.651 km)
- Track gauge: 4 ft 2 in (1,270 mm)

The Ticknall Tramway was a 12.8 mi (20.6 km) long 4 ft 2 in (1,270 mm) gauge horse-drawn plateway terminating at Ticknall, Derbyshire, England. It operated from 1802 to 1913.

== Location ==
The industrial tramway connected the brickyards, lime quarries and lime yards of Ticknall to the Ashby Canal. It had branches to the quarries and lime works at Cloud Hill and to the Smoile and Lount collieries.

== History ==
The construction and use of the tramway was permitted by an act of Parliament, the Ashby de la Zouch Canal Act 1794 (34 Geo. 3. c. 93) of 25 May 1794. Ashby Canal Company decided on 21 August 1798, to contract Benjamin Outram, one of the founders of the Butterley Company in Derbyshire regarding the benefits of using a tramway instead of a canal. The company approved his recommendations in December 1798 and issued some notes regarding the route. In December 1799 the company concluded that it could not finance a double-track line, and built just a single-track line from Old Parks Tunnel to Ticknall but a double-track from Willesley to Old Parks. Due to the lack of liquidity, Outram threatened the company in February 1801 to stop all work if he was not paid. The company complained about Outram's workmanship and contracted Joseph Wilkes of Measham and other inspectors, to assess the line in 1802 and 1803. Their reports show the length of the completed sections as follows.

Route	Length
Willesley to Old Parks	3 miles 72 chains 7 yards (6.283 km)
Old Parks to Cloud Hill	4 miles 2 chains 16 yards (6.492 km)
Old Parks to Ticknall	4 miles 1 chain 2 yards (6.459 km)
Branch at Ticknall to Burdett's works	29 chains 13 yards (0.595 km)
Branch to Marget's Close	17 chains 19 yards (0.359 km)
Total length (excluding passing loops and sidings)	12 miles 43 chains 13 yards (20.189 km)
Passing loops and sidings	22 chains 21 yards (0.462 km)
Total length	12 miles 66 chains 12 yards (20.651 km)

The tramway was informally taken into use between July and October 1802. It was last used on 1913 and officially closed in 1915. The tramway is recognised as "well ahead of its time" and "a milestone in transport technology and a model for the modern railway systems which followed thirty years later."

== Tracks ==
The L-shaped cast iron rails were cast in Benjamin Outram's foundry of the Butterley Iron works, keeping them fully occupied for 15 months. The rails each had a length of 3 feet (910 mm) and an average weight of 38 lb (17 kg) and were mounted onto setts (stone sleeper blocks) with a minimum weight of 150 lb (68 kg). Waggons with flangeless wheels were hauled by horses.

The horizontal running track of the rails was 4 inches (100 mm) wide, and the curved upright flange was 2 inches (50 mm) high at the ends and 3–3 1/2 inches (75–90 mm) in the centre. The track was called “Outram Way”. The gauge of 4 ft 2 in (1,270 mm) was 8 inches (200 mm) wider than that of Outram's earlier tramways, as he believed that this would offer additional capacity for the transporting of goods.

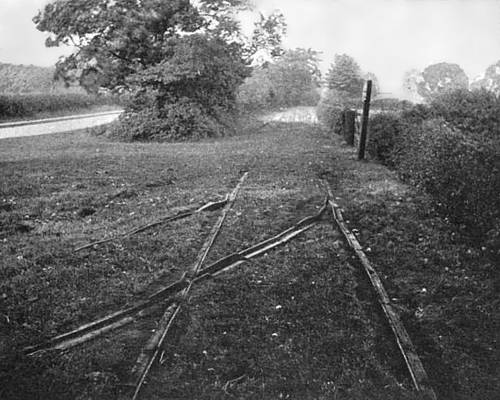
Switch of the “Outram Way”

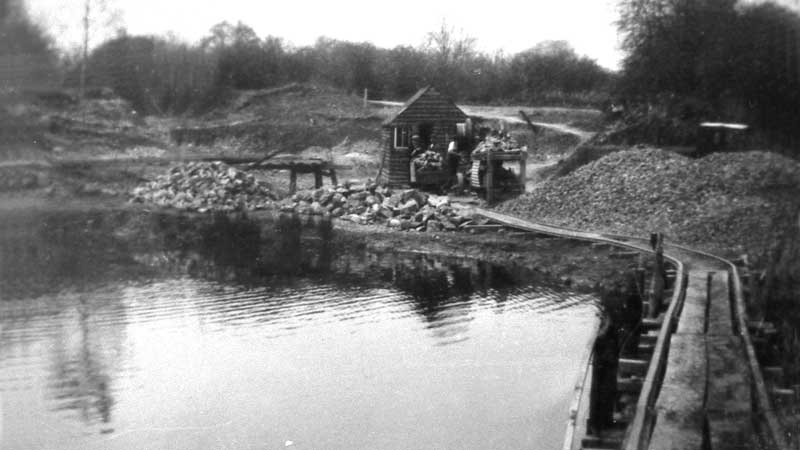
Blackwater Pit

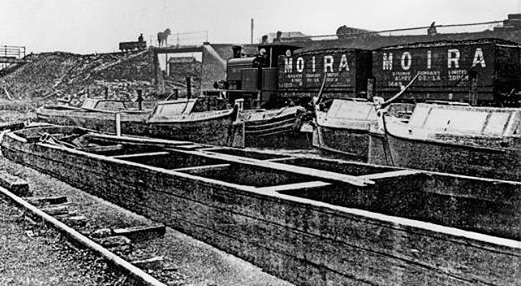
Tramway bridge at Woodlands Wharf

== Bridges and tunnels ==
Some of the embankments and cuts cans still be seen, as well as a bridge (The Arch) over the Main Street in Ticknall, which is still being used by farmers. It looks similar to canal bridges, is Grade II listed, as it is one of the oldest railway bridges in the world.

Two 138-and-51-yard-long (126 and 47 m) cut and cover tunnels are well preserved in Calke Park. The longer tunnel is an underpass of the main drive to Calke Abbey, the hall of the Harpur family, which is now owned by the National Trust. Stone sleeper blocks can still be seen at various points along the route.

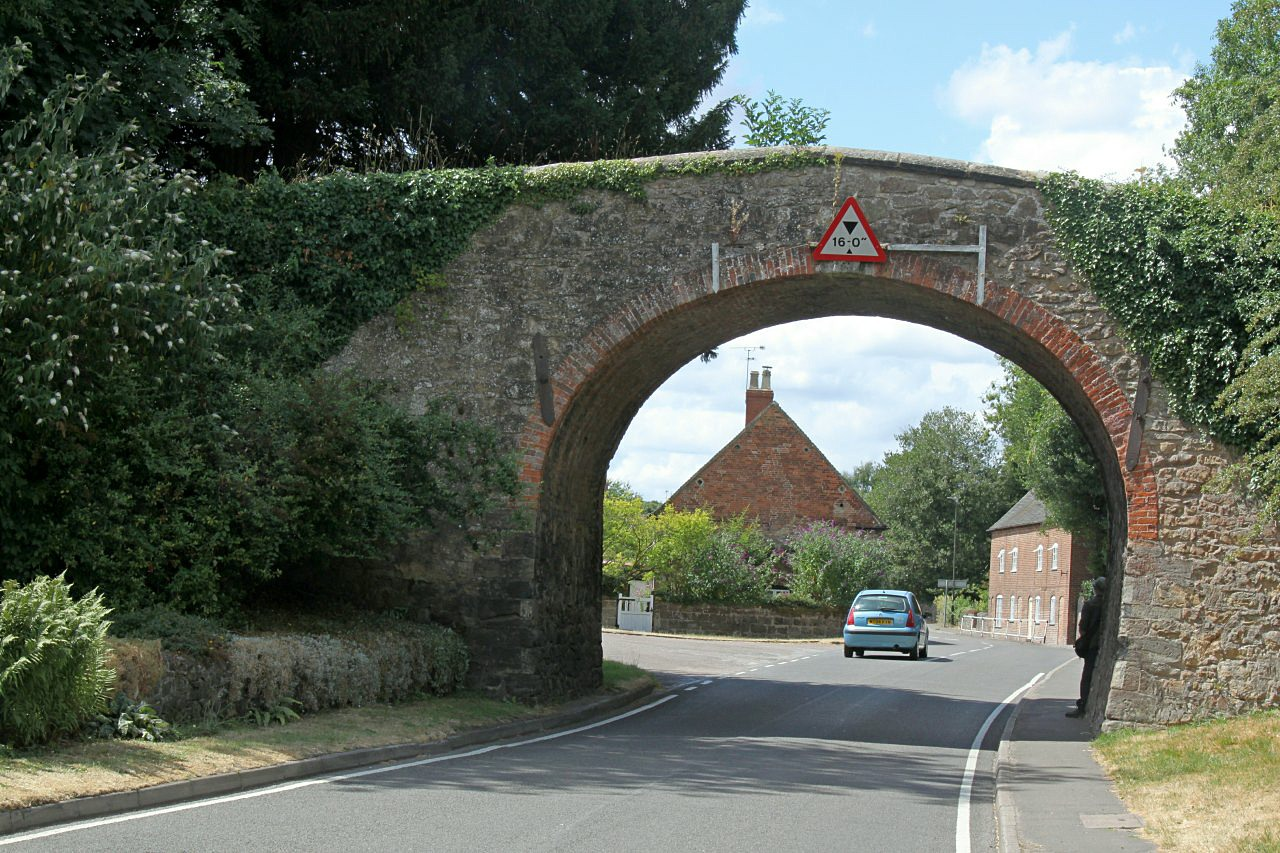
“The Arch” over Main Street in Ticknall

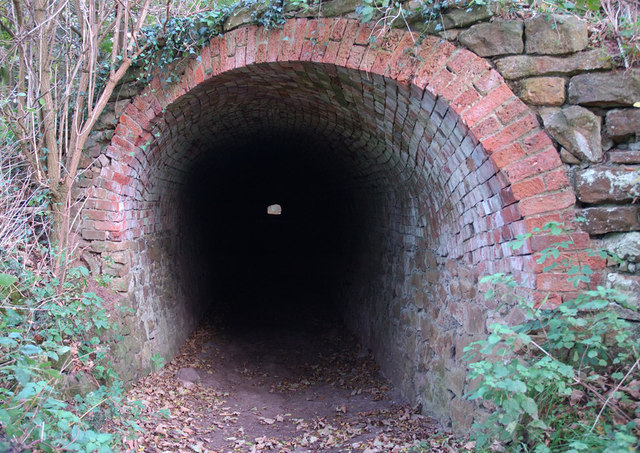
Southwestern mouth of the Calke Abbey Tunnel

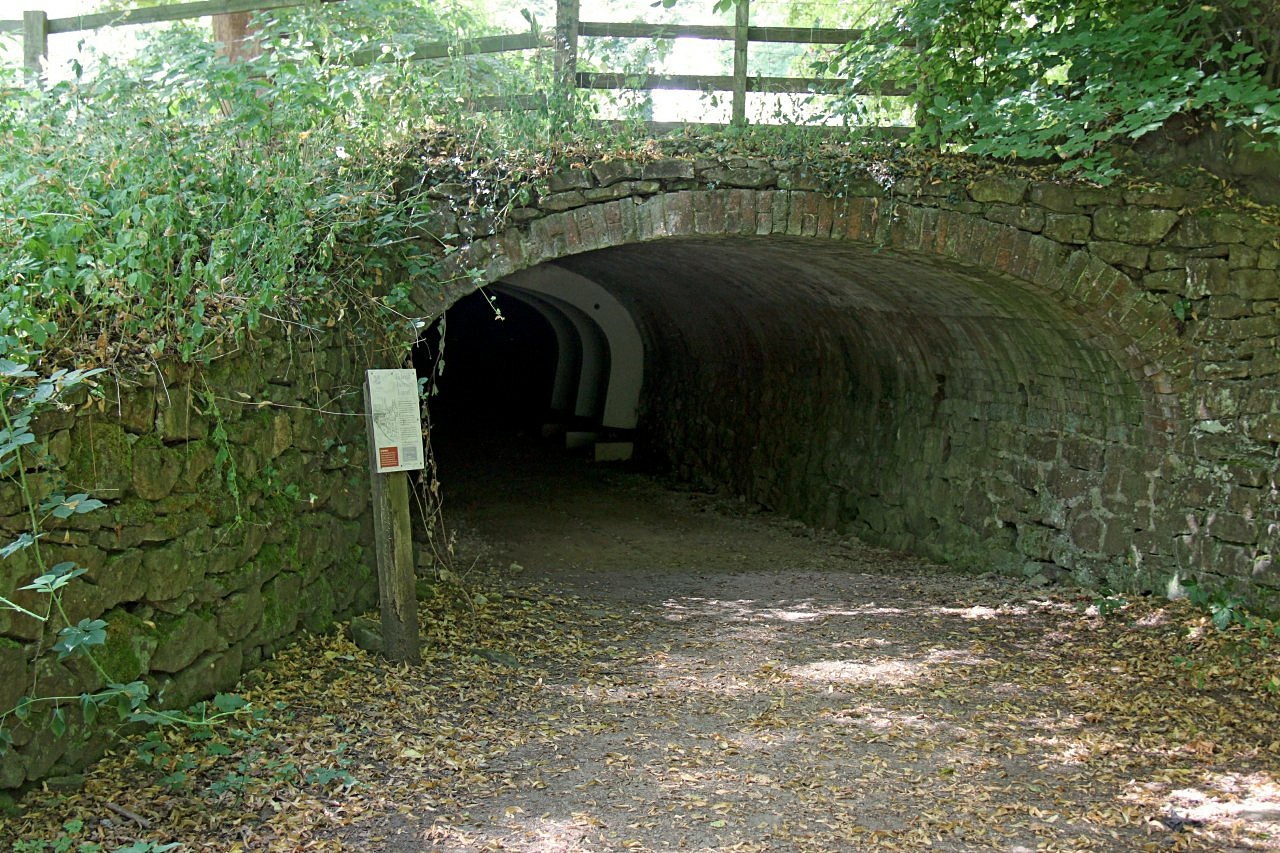
Eastern mouth of the Calke Abbey Tunnel

== Operation ==
Benjamin Outram planned to use two horses to haul a train in the flat area, and support these by a third horse on the uphill section from Ticknall to the top of Pistern Hill. The support horse was to be led back by a boy four times a day, to support the uphill run of other trains. Consequently, four men, one boy and nine horses were required to transport 40 tons of stones from Ticknall to the Ashby Canal, and on the return runs 12 tons coal, slack (coal dust) and other goods.

== Literature ==
- Gerry Calderbank: Canal, Coal & Tramway: An Introduction to the Industrial Heritage of Mamble. L C Promotions, 2000.
- Geoffrey Holt: The Ticknall Tramway. Ticknall Preservation and Historical Society, 2002.
- I. Stabb und T. Downing: The Redlake Tramway and the China Clay Industry. T. Downing, 1977.
- John Stanley Webb: Black Country Tramways: Company-worked Tramways and Light Railways of the West Midlands Industrial Area: 1913–39. J. S. Webb, 1976, ISBN 0950376418
