= Derbyshire County Cricket League =

English cricket league

- Countries: England
- Administrator: derbyscountylge.play-cricket.com
- Format: Limited Overs
- First edition: 2000
- Tournament format: League
- Number of teams: 12 (ECB Premier Division)
- Current champion: Denby CC
- Most successful: Ockbrook & Borrowash CC (7)
- Website: derbyscountylge.play-cricket.com

The Premier Division of the Derbyshire County Cricket League (DCCL) is the top level of competition for recreational club cricket in Derbyshire, England, and is a designated ECB Premier League. The Premier League was founded in 2000 as a separate league from the Derbyshire County Cricket League, and at that time was called the Derbyshire Premier Cricket League. The two leagues amalgamated before the 2016 season, and the Derbyshire Premier Cricket League became the Premier Division of the Derbyshire County Cricket League. While most of the league's member clubs are from Derbyshire, there are also clubs from the Burton upon Trent area of Staffordshire, Leicestershire and Nottinghamshire.

Cricket clubs registered in the Derbyshire County Cricket League in 2022.

== Champions ==
League champions 1999-2018
Year	Club
1999	Ockbrook & Borrowash
2000	Alvaston and Boulton
2001	Denby
2002	Sandiacre Town
2003	Clifton
2004	Sandiacre Town
2005	Ockbrook & Borrowash
2006	Ockbrook & Borrowash
2007	Spondon
2008	Chesterfield
2009	Ockbrook & Borrowash
2010	Lullington Park
2011	Ockbrook & Borrowash
2012	Sandiacre Town
2013	Swarkestone
2014	Ockbrook & Borrowash
2015	Sandiacre Town
2016	Swarkestone
2017	Sandiacre Town
2018	Ticknall

League champions 2019-present
Year	Club
2019	Spondon
2020	COVID-19 pandemic
2021	Sandiacre Town
2022	Swarkestone
2023	Swarkestone
2024	Alvaston and Boulton
2025	Ockbrook & Borrowash
2026	Denby

=== Championships won ===
League championship
Wins	Club
7	Ockbrook & Borrowash
6	Sandiacre Town
4	Swarkestone
2	Alvaston and Boulton
2	Denby
2	Spondon
1	Chesterfield
1	Clifton
1	Lullington Park
1	Ticknall

== Performance by season from 2000 ==
Key
Gold	Champions
Blue	Left league
Red	Relegated

Premier Division performance by season, from 2000
Club	2000	2001	2002	2003	2004	2005	2006	2007	2008	2009	2010	2011	2012	2013	2014	2015	2016	2017	2018	2019	2020	2021	2022	2023	2024	2025	2026
Alfreton							5	9	9	8	10	11			11								8				
Alrewas																							7	8	8	7	9
Alvaston and Boulton	1	6	11	10	9	8	10	6	7	9	6	5	10	10	7	11		8	10	8		7	10	6	1	3	2
Aston on Trent										12																	
Belper Meadows																									10	10	8
Chesterfield	6	9	7	6	5	9	8	8	1	3	4	6	5	6	9	3	10	4	7	4		11				8	10
Clifton			8	1	4	10	7	12												11							
Cutthorpe																	9	12						9	7	12	
Denby	10	1	6	4	10	5	9	11					6	4	5	7	8	7	9	6		4	4	2	5	5	1
Duffield																											11
Dunstall	2	2	3	11		6	3	5	10	6	9	8	8	7	8	12				12				7	12		
Eckington														11		9	6	3	5	10		10	9	11			12
Elvaston								10	11		12								8	7		12					
Heanor Town (Note: Heanor Town resigned from the Premier League after the 2001 season.)	8	10																									
Ilkeston Rutland	9	7	4	7	6	3	12		5	7	8	12															
Langley Mill United	11	11	5																			6	12				
Lullington Park								7	6	5	1	9	7	9	10	8	11										
Marehay						7	11								12			11				9	11				
Matlock											11			12													
Ockbrook and Borrowash	3	3	2	5	3	1	1	2	2	1	2	1	3	8	1	6	2	9	4	3		2	3	3	4	1	6
Quarndon	7	4	9	8	2	4	6	4	8	10	7	7	11			10	12										
Rolleston																	7	10	12					10	9	11	
Rolls Royce Leisure										11		10	12														
Sandiacre Town	4	5	1	2	1	2	2	3	3	2	3	2	1	5	2	1	3	1	3	5		1	2	4	2	2	4
Sawley (Note: Sawley & Long Eaton Park changed its name to Sawley after the 2020 season.)			10	3	7	12																			11		
Shipley Hall	12				12																						
Spondon							4	1	4	4	5	3	9	3	6	4	4	2	2	1		5	5	5	6	4	3
Stainsby Hall	5	12																									
Staveley Welfare					8	11																					
Swarkestone													2	1	3	2	1	5	6	9		8	1	1	3	9	5
Ticknall									12			4	4	2	4	5	5	6	1	2		3	6	12		6	7
Wirksworth and Middleton		8	12	9	11														11								
References																					(Note: The COVID-19 pandemic forced a reduction in league activity. A replacement competition was organised for the latter part of the season when cricket became possible again, but with the winners not to be regarded as official league champions.)						
