= Mansfield and District Cricket League =

Regional English Cricket League

- Countries: England
- Format: Limited overs cricket
- First edition: 1947 (Founded)
- Tournament format: League
- Number of teams: 9 (Premier)
- Current champion: Aston Hall CC
- Website: https://manssunlge.play-cricket.com/

The Mansfield and District Cricket League (MDCL) is a Sunday League, founded in 1947. The league in 2022 listed 59 teams from 53 clubs split into 6 Divisions, with regionalisation of the divisions organised into the bottom 4 sections. The League headquarters is based in Rotherham.

The Mansfield and District Cricket League traditionally covers the northern half of Nottinghamshire's Sunday recreational cricket, with the Newark Club Cricket Alliance covering the south, but a significant number of clubs also take part from Derbyshire and South Yorkshire. Since 2007, Welbeck has held the highest number of league championship titles, with their latest win in 2023.

Mansfield and District Cricket League 2021

== Past winners ==
Year	Champions
2007	Welbeck
2008	Kirkby Portland
2009	Mansfield Hosiery Mills
2010	Cuckney
2011	Eckington
2012	Welbeck
2013	Eckington
2014	Anston
2015	Anston
2016	Eckington
2017	Thoresby Colliery
2018	Farnsfield
2019	Welbeck
2020	League suspended
2021	Welbeck
2022	Welbeck
2023	Welbeck
2024	Notts & Arnold Amateur
2025	Welbeck
2026	Aston Hall

== Performance by season from 2007 ==
Key
Gold	Champions
Blue	Left League
Red	Relegated

Performance by season, from 2007
Club	2007	2008	2009	2010	2011	2012	2013	2014	2015	2016	2017	2018	2019	2020	2021	2022	2023	2024	2025	2026
Anston							4	1	1	7	2	5	10					9		
Ashover										8	7	2								
Aston Hall									9										2	1
Bawtry with Everton																			5	6
Blidworth	6	9																		
Chesterfield																6	6			
Clumber Park																		7		
Coal Aston	9																			
Cuckney		2	2	1	7	7	10		7	5	4	9	6		4	4	7	10	9	10
Cutthorpe															5	8				
Denby												8								
Eckington	8				4	3	1	5	2	1	10									
Edwinstowe			4	4	5	8		9												
Farnsfield				2	2	4	5	3	3	6	6	1	2		2	5	8			
Glapwell Colliery	10	5	3	5	3	2	2	7	5									6		
Grassmoor Works										4	9									
Handsworth Junior Sporting Club											5									
Hollinsend Methodist																				2
Hucknall				6	6	1	7	8	4	3	3	3	5		7	3	2	5	7	9
Kirkby Portland	5	1	8	7	10		9						8		3	9				
Mansfield		4	6	9			6	6												
Mansfield Hosiery Mills	2	7	1	10		6	8	10									5	3	4	4
Millhouses Works				8	9															
Morton Colliery													4							
Newstead Abbey and Village	4	10																		
Nottingham Badshahs																				3
Notts & Arnold Amateur																	3	1	8	
Pakistan																		4	3	5
Papplewick and Linby													3							
Parkhead												6	9		8					
Sheffield Collegiate					8	10		4	8											
Sheffield United																			6	7
Sheffield Works Department	3	6	7																	
Spital			9																	
Teversal										9										
The Wednesday																				
Thoresby Colliery											1	7	7		6	2	4	8	10	
Underwood	7	8	10			9														
Waleswood Sports																7				
Welbeck	1	3	5	3	1	5	3	2	6	2	8	4	1		1	1	1	2	1	8
References														(Note: Coronavirus pandemic forced all formal competitive sporting activities to be suspended.)						
