= List of parson-naturalists =

Parson-naturalists were ministers of religion who also studied natural history. The archetypical parson-naturalist was a priest in the Church of England in charge of a country parish, who saw the study of science as an extension of his religious work. The philosophy entailed the belief that God, as the Creator of all things, wanted man to understand his Creations and thus to study them through scientific techniques. They often collected and preserved natural artefacts such as leaves, flowers, birds' eggs, birds, insects, and small mammals to classify and study. Some wrote books or kept nature diaries.

== Parson-naturalists ==
Leading parson-naturalists
Name	Dates	Description	Known for	Portrait
Turner, William	1508?–1568	Dean of Wells Cathedral	Herbalism; Libellus de Re Herbaria	
Ray, John	1627–1705	Father of English natural history; taxonomy; empiricism	Historia Plantarum	
Derham, William	1657–1735	Physico-Theology, (Natural theology)	Estimated speed of sound Astronomy, listed nebulae	
White, Gilbert	1720–1793	Curate of Selborne, Hampshire ornithology	Natural History and Antiquities of Selborne	Probably not authentic
Lightfoot, John	1735–1788	Botanist; Conchologist	Flora Scotica (1789)	
Henslow, John Stevens	1796–1861	Botanist, Geologist	Mentor and friend of his pupil Charles Darwin	
Jenyns, Leonard	1800–1893	Priest, founder of Bath Natural History and Antiquarian Field Club	Phenology and meteorology observations	
Fox, William Darwin	1805–1880	Priest, Entomologist, collector of beetles	Tutored his second cousin Charles Darwin in natural history	
Tristram, Henry Baker	1822–1906	Biblical scholar, Ornithologist	Early acceptance of Darwinism, tried to reconcile it with creation	
Wood, John George	1827–1889	Natural history populariser and lecturer	Common Objects of the Country	
Dallinger, William	1839–1909	Methodist minister, microbiology	Research on monads Opposition to spontaneous generation	
Cowper, Spencer	1713–1774	Dean of Durham 1746–1774	Meteorology	
Morris, Francis Orpen	1810–1893	Irascible Irish clergyman Strongly opposed Darwinism & fox-hunting Campaigned for bird conservation law	History of British Birds; A Bible Natural History; Records of Animal Sagacity and Character; Dogs and Their Doings	
Bloxam, Andrew	1801–1878	Naturalist on HMS Blonde; Later priest and naturalist	Recorded and collected Hawaiian birds, some now extinct Later particularly known for fungi, Rubus and Rosa	
Berkeley, Miles Joseph	1803–1889	Vicar of Sibbertoft for much of his life Known as the founder of British mycology	Account of native British fungi in Sir William Jackson Hooker's British Flora (1836); Introduction to Cryptogamic Botany (1857); Outlines of British Fungology (1860)	
Linton, William Richardson	1850–1908	Botanist, Vicar of Shirley, Derbyshire	Work on brambles of Derbyshire, including Rubus durescens Flora of Derbyshire: Flowering Plants, Higher Cryptogams, Mosses and Hepatics, Characeae	

== See also ==
- List of Christian thinkers in science
- Science in the Age of Enlightenment

== Bibliography ==
- Armstrong, Patrick (2000). The English Parson-naturalist: A Companionship Between Science and Religion. Gracewing Publishing. ISBN 978-0-85244-516-7.
