= Stydd Hall =

Coordinates: 52.9573°N 1.7454°W

- Alternative names: Stydd Castle

General information
- Architectural style: Elizabethan, Jacobean
- Town or city: Yeaveley
- Country: England

Stydd Hall (Castle) is a country house located near to the village of Yeaveley, Derbyshire, 15 miles (24 km) west of Derby, close to the A515 between Wyaston to the north, Great Cubley to the south, Yeaveley to the east and Alkmonton to the northeast. Stydd had formerly been an independent township but has all but disappeared: the hall and a farm are all that remains.

Stydd Hall is still occupied and in use as a farmhouse but had previously been described as in need of repair and restoration.
The hall remains private property, but is visible from adjacent public footpaths.

== History and buildings ==
It was originally a medieval fortified preceptory, of the Knights Hospitaller, known as Yeaveley Preceptory (or sometimes Stydd Preceptory) founded in 1190. The present site consists of a large moated platform, which supports the remains of the 13th-century chapel of St Mary and St John the Baptist, dissolved in 1540 as part of dissolution of the monasteries. The north wall, with its doorway and three lancet windows, stands to roof height. In the centre of the platform and built on the foundations of the domestic ranges of the preceptory, is a 17th-century brick tower house with a substantial quantity of medieval masonry in the south wall. The house is mainly Elizabethan or Jacobean in date, with mid-19th-century alterations. The chapel is a Grade I listed building.

== See also ==
- Grade II* listed buildings in Derbyshire Dales
- Listed buildings in Yeaveley

== See also ==
- Yeaveley Preceptory
