= Listed buildings in Edlaston and Wyaston =

Edlaston and Wyaston is a civil parish in the Derbyshire Dales district of Derbyshire, England. The parish contains seven listed buildings that are recorded in the National Heritage List for England. Of these, one is listed at Grade II*, the middle of the three grades, and the others are at Grade II, the lowest grade. The parish contains the villages of Edlaston and Wyaston and the surrounding area. The listed buildings consist of a church, a cross and two tombs in the churchyard, two houses, and farm buildings.

== Key ==
Grade	Criteria
II*	Particularly important buildings of more than special interest
II	Buildings of national importance and special interest

== Buildings ==
Name and location	Photograph	Date	Notes	Grade
St James' Church, Edlaston; 52.98113°N 1.73162°W		Early 14th century	The church has been altered and enlarged through the centuries, and the vestry and bellcote were added in 1900. The church is built in sandstone with roofs of tile and lead. It consists of a nave, a south porch, a chancel, and a west vestry. On the west gable is a bellcote with two arched bell openings, and a roof with a lead spike. The porch has an entrance with a chamfered surround and a round-arched doorway, and on the south wall is a circular sundial.	II*
Cross; 52.98100°N 1.73152°W	—	17th century	The cross is in the churchyard of St James' Church, Edlaston, and is in sandstone. It consists of a square chamfered plinth, a moulded circular base, and a tapering circular shaft surmounted by a ball.	II
Tomb 10 yards south of porch 52.98102°N 1.73171°W	—	Late 17th century (probable)	The tomb is in the churchyard of St James' Church, Edlaston, and is in sandstone. It is a table tomb with a plain base, pilaster angle strips, and a flat overhanging top with bold gadrooning. The Latin inscription is illegible.	II
Tomb 6 yards south of porch 52.98101°N 1.73156°W	—	c. 1711	The tomb in the churchyard of St James' Church, Edlaston is to the memory of John Kirkland. It is in sandstone, and consists of a table tomb with a plain base, and a flat overhanging slab on the top with chamfer on the underside. There are inscriptions on the south and east sides.	II
Edlaston Hall; 52.98309°N 1.73834°W		Early 18th century	The house is in red brick with stone dressings, chamfered quoins, floor bands, a moulded eaves cornice, and a tile roof with coped gables and moulded kneelers. The central block has two storeys and a semi-basement and five bays, and it is flanked by lower two-storey single-bay wings. In the semi-basement is a doorway and mullioned windows. Steps lead up to the main doorway that has a moulded lugged architrave and a keystone. On the front are sash windows with wedge lintels, and blind windows with segmental heads. The wings contain casement windows, and at the rear is a gabled staircase tower.	II
Farm building northwest of Edlaston Hall; 52.98331°N 1.73855°W	—	18th century	A range of farm buildings in red brick with sandstone dressings, and tile roof with coped gables and moulded kneelers. In the centre is a two-storey range containing two doorways with Tudor arches, one with stable-type doors, two small windows, and a loft door. The bay to the left has a window and a pair of doors, and to the north is a 19th-century cowhouse with a sliding door.	II
Wyaston Grove; 52.97834°N 1.71810°W		1802–03	A house in rendered brick on a chamfered plinth, with a sill band, an eaves band, and hipped Welsh slate roofs with overhanging eaves. There are two storeys and four bays. The windows are sashes; those in the ground floor have trefoil tracery in the top panes.	II
