= Edlaston and Wyaston =

Civil parish in Derbyshire, England

Coordinates: 52.980°N 1.727°W

- Civil parish
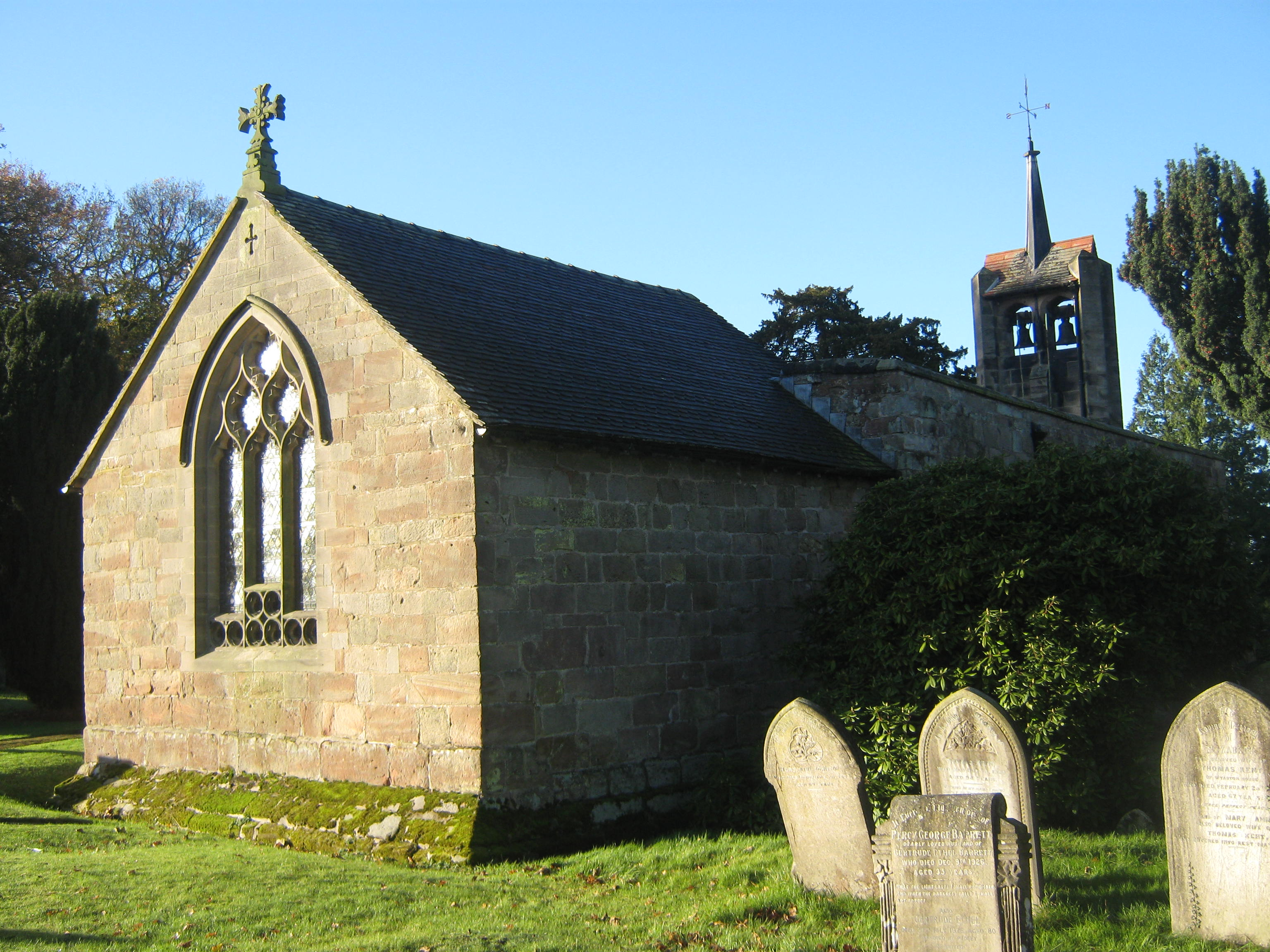
- Saint James Church, Edlaston

- Location within Derbyshire
- Interactive map of Edlaston and Wyaston
- Area: 2.14 sq mi (5.5 km^{2})
- Population: 241 (2021)
  - Density: 113/sq mi (44/km^{2})
- OS grid reference: SK 185423
  - London: 120 mi (190 km) SE
- District: Derbyshire Dales
- Shire county: Derbyshire
- Region: East Midlands
- Country: England
- Sovereign state: United Kingdom
- Places: Settlements: Edlaston; Wyaston
- Post town: ASHBOURNE
- Postcode district: DE6
- Dialling code: 01335
- Police: Derbyshire
- Fire: Derbyshire
- Ambulance: East Midlands
- UK Parliament: Derbyshire Dales
- Website: edlastonwyaston.wordpress.com

Edlaston and Wyaston is a civil parish within the Derbyshire Dales district, in the county of Derbyshire, England. The parish includes the villages of Edlaston and Wyaston. In 2011 the parish had a population of 220, which increased to 241 in the census of 2021. It is 120 miles (190 km) north west of London, 11 miles (18 km) north west of the county city of Derby, and 2 1/2 miles (4 km) south of the market town of Ashbourne. Edlaston and Wyaston touches the parishes of Clifton and Compton, Osmaston, Rodsley, Shirley, Snelston and Yeaveley. There are seven listed buildings in Edlaston and Wyaston.

== Toponymy ==
Edlaston: Appears to derive from 'Eadwulf's farm'. This was reported in Domesday as Dulvestune, before a recognisable modern form appearing in public records from the 12th century.

Wyaston: Also in Domesday, as Widerdestune, meaning 'Wīgh(e)ard's farm'.

Edlaston and Wyaston, as an ecclesiastical and subsequent political entity, the two settlements have been combined as a parish since medieval times.

== Geography ==
=== Location ===
Edlaston and Wyaston is surrounded by the following local areas:

- Clifton to the north
- Hales Green, Rodsley and Yeavesley to the south
- Osmaston and Shirley to the east
- Snelston to the west.

The parish is roughly bounded by Dobbinhorse Lane along the north, the A515 road to the west, Darley Moor Sports Centre and Brown's Brook along the south, and Poor Plantation and Wyaston Brook to the east.

=== Settlements ===
The two settlements within the parish are:

- Edlaston
- Wyaston

==== Edlaston ====
The smaller of the two areas, it is sited centrally within the parish, east of the A515 road, with nearly all properties aligned along Edlaston Lane. The village supports a church and public house. Edlaston Hall is a farmhouse also within the village.

==== Wyaston ====
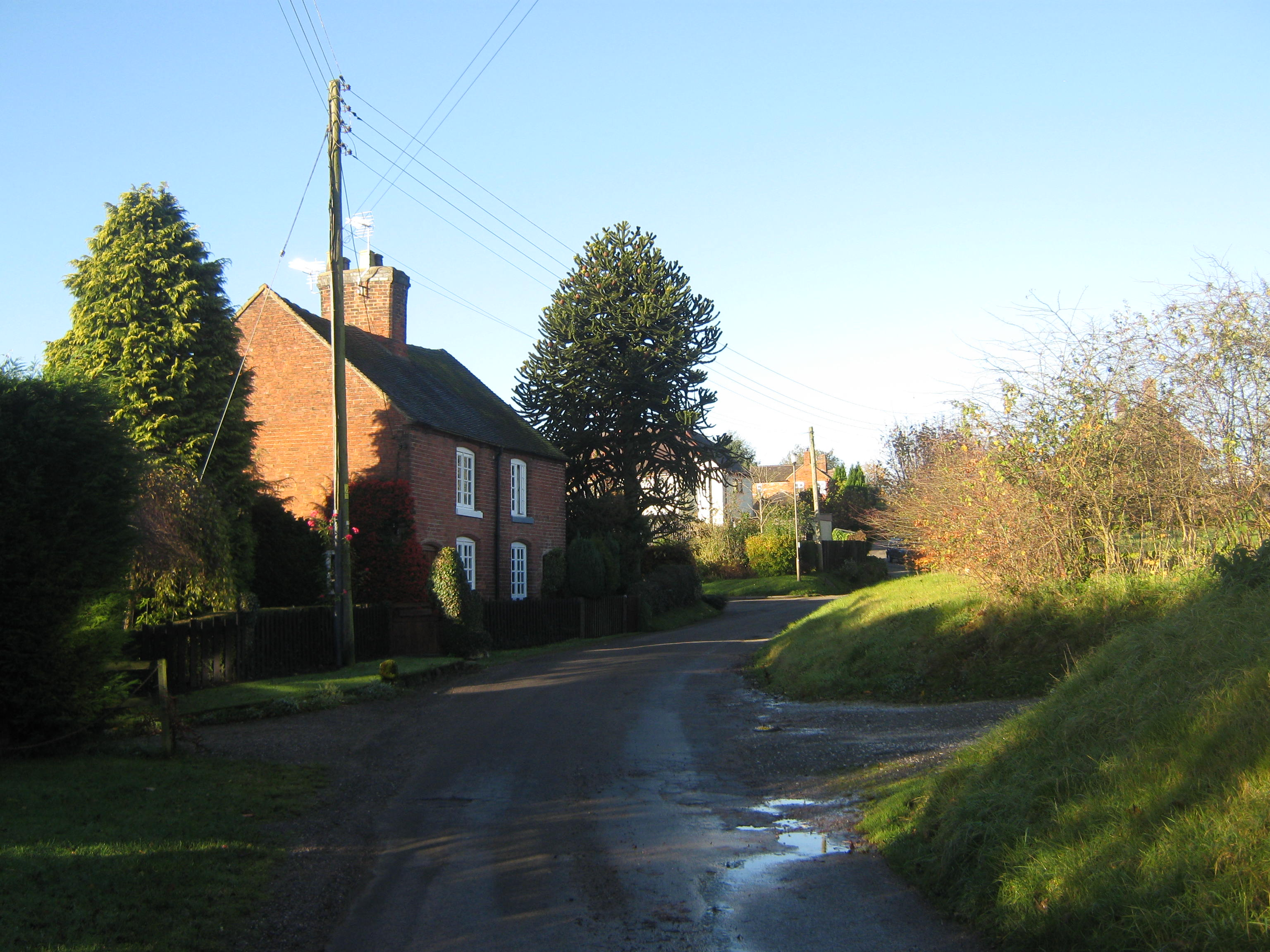
Wyaston village

This is 1/4 mile (1/2 km) southeast of Edlaston, It is aligned to a number of roads including the Ashbourne to Tutbury route, and maintains more residences than Edlaston, as well as the village hall.

=== Environment ===
==== Landscape ====
Primarily farmland throughout the parish outside the villages, there is some small forestry plots throughout the parish, with a stretch surrounding Wyaston Brook. There is a plateau which currently is used for cycle and bike racing.

==== Water features ====
Two streams exist by the boundary of the parish: Brown's Brook along the south, and Wyaston Brook to the east.

==== Land elevation ====
The parish contains some of the highest land locally, ranging from 120–180 metres (390–590 ft), the parish peak is by the central road junction in Wyaston.

== History ==
Edlaston and Wyaston was an ancient parish in Derby county and became a modern civil parish when those were established in 1866, but only becoming a secular body in 1894.

Edlaston and Wyaston have a long history as separate townships, yet they form a single, if dispersed village.

=== Industry ===
As well as the regularised agricultural roles because of its rural location, primarily for dairy farming, the area has also supported much gravel mining for many centuries, with several pits previously recorded in the vicinity. In the mid-1950s, maps showed a water treatment plant and a reservoir in the west of the parish.

== Religious sites ==
=== St James' Church, Edlaston ===
The church dates from the 14th century, but rebuilt in the 17th, based on a year inscribed on a date stone.

=== Methodism ===
There was previously a Wesleyan Methodist chapel until the middle 20th century in Wyaston, which was later demolished.

== Governance and demography ==
=== Population ===
There are 241 residents recorded within the parish for the 2021 census, an increase from the 220 residents recorded within the parish for the 2011 census.

=== Council administration ===
The settlements Edlaston, Wyaston and their surrounding rural areas are combined as one parish for administrative identity. This is managed at the first level of public administration by Edlaston and Wyaston Parish Council. At district level, the wider area is overseen by Derbyshire Dales district council. Derbyshire County Council provides the highest level strategic services locally.

== Community, culture & leisure ==
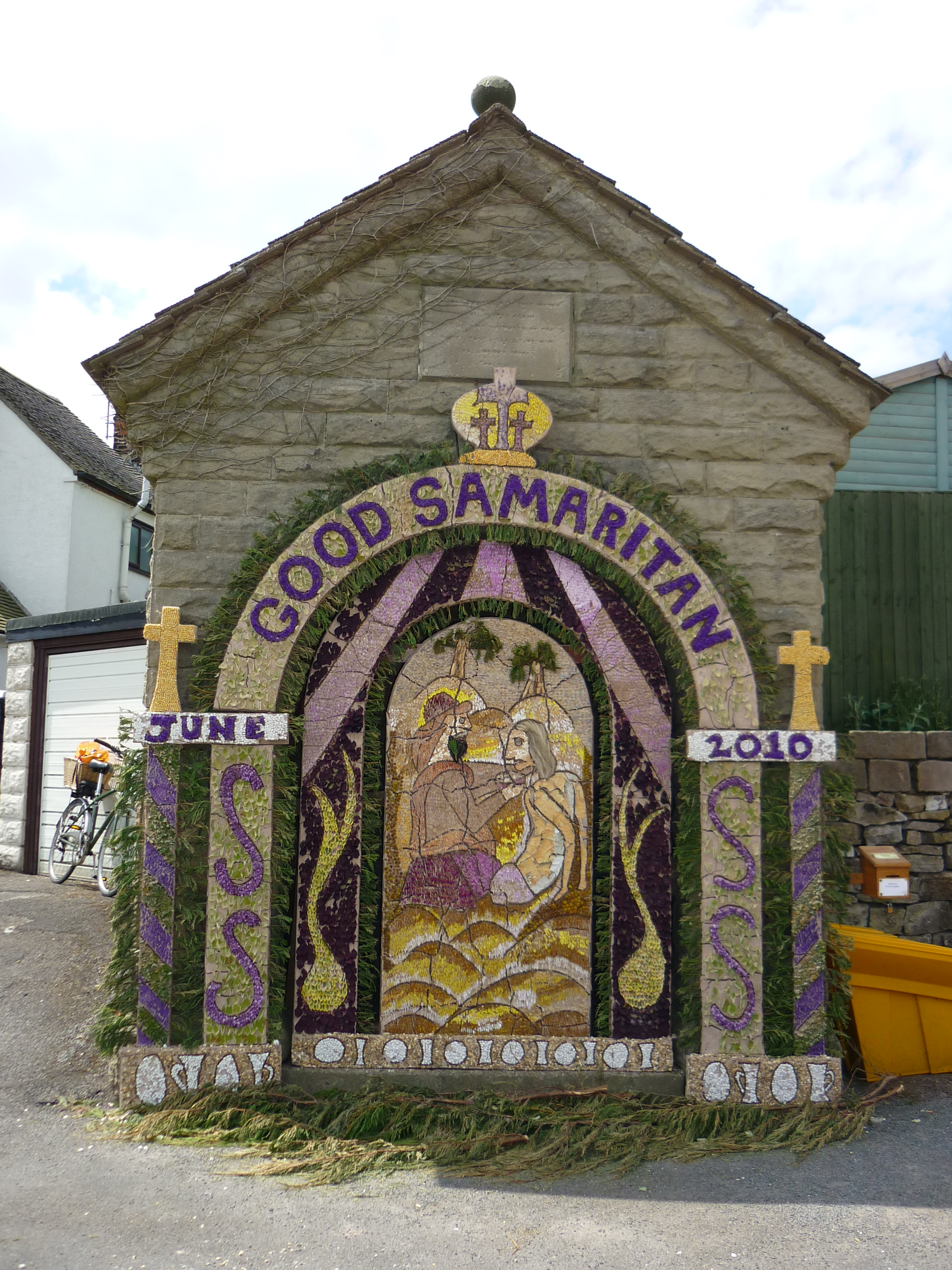
Wyaston Village well dressing in 2010

A community hall is in use at Wyaston village.

There is one public house at Edlaston.

=== Cycle route ===
Route 68 of the National Cycle Network follows the Ashbourne to Tutbury road (Wyaston Road).

=== Aviation and race track ===
Darley Moor Airfield is used for some civil aviation activities, but also has a dual use as an occasional motor bike and cycling circuit. Based on the site of a former RAF airfield, it is south of Edlaston with the bulk of the circuit within the parish despite the moor being mainly in Snelston.

=== Well dressing ===
Derbyshire and the wider region has a centuries-old established well dressing ritual, a regular ceremony takes place at a well on Edlaston Lane and in Wyaston village.

== Landmarks ==
=== Listed buildings ===
There are seven listed structures in the parish, most including Edlaston Hall are Grade II, with the church at the higher designation of Grade II*.

=== Local monuments ===
There is a number of tumulus (historic burial mounds) throughout the wider region, with one site in the south east of the parish known as the Wyaston Hlaew, it is recorded as a scheduled monument.

A moat west of Edlaston Hall is also listed in the area.
