= Yeaveley Preceptory =

Preceptory of the Knights Hospitaller in Derbyshire, England

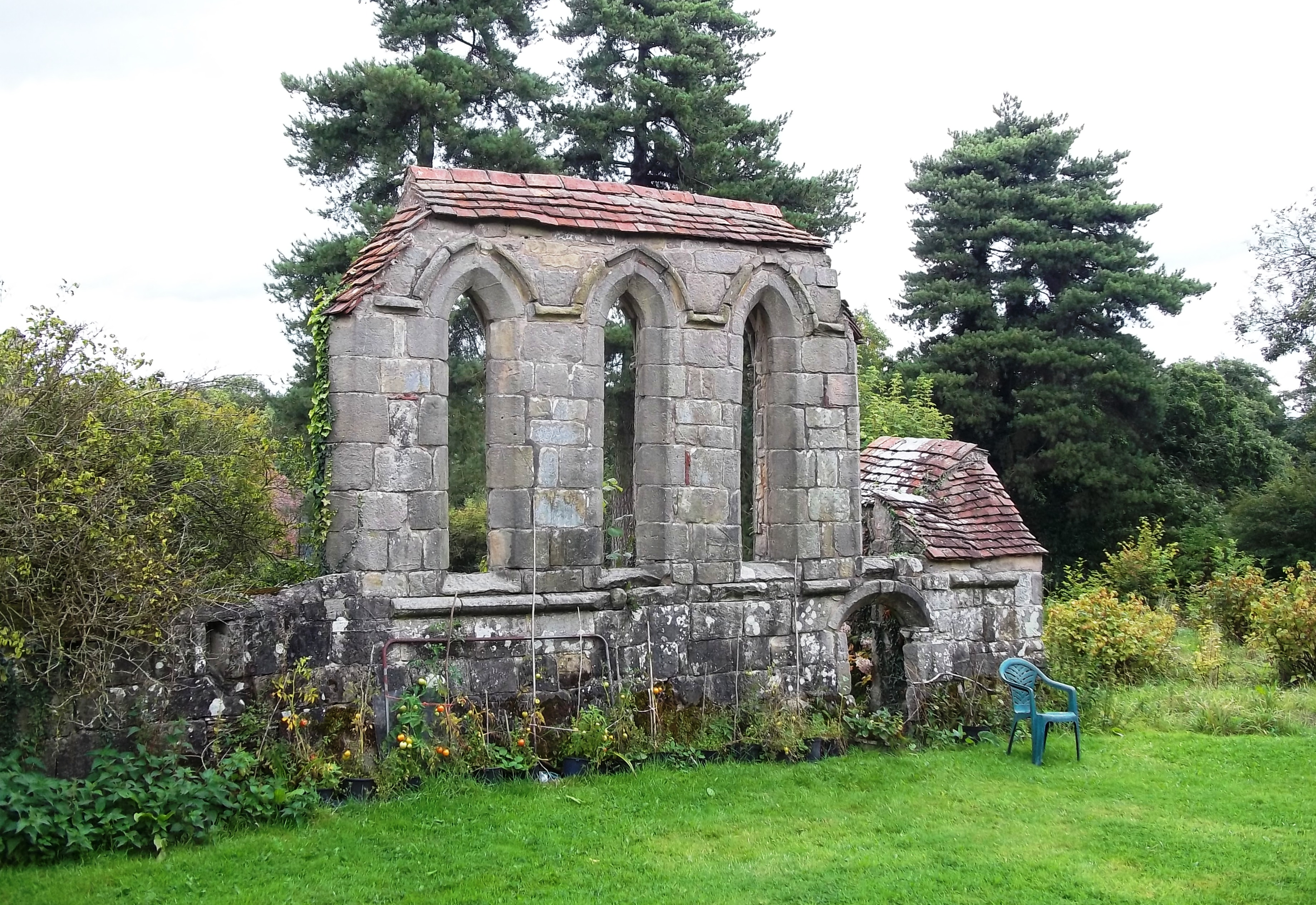
- The remains of the Preceptory

- Location within Derbyshire
- Interactive map of Yeaveley Preceptory

Monastery information
- Other names: Stydd Preceptory; The Joint Preceptory of Yeaveley and Barrow; Yeaveley Bailiwick
- Order: Knights Hospitaller
- Established: 1190
- Disestablished: 1543
- Dedication: Saint Mary and Saint John the Baptist
- Controlled churches: Barrow Camera; Staveley, Derbyshire

People
- Founder: Founded following donation by Ralph Foun

Site
- Location: 1 Mile West of Yeaveley, Derbyshire, England, United Kingdom.
- Coordinates: 52°57′26″N 1°44′43″W
- Visible remains: Ruins of Chapel still visible.
- Public access: Ruins are on Private Property but may be visible from adjacent public rights of way

Yeaveley Preceptory, also known as Stydd Preceptory, was a preceptory of the Knights Hospitaller, near the village of Yeaveley, in Derbyshire, England. It was around a mile west of the village, on the site of the current Stydd Hall. The Preceptory has been variously known as "Yeaveley Preceptory", "Yeaveley Bailiwick", "Yeaveley and Barrow Preceptory" and "Stydd Preceptory".

Preceptories like this were founded in order to raise revenues to fund the Hospitallers' 12th- and 13th-century crusades to Jerusalem.

The Preceptory's ruins are protected as a Grade I listed building; The moated site is protected as a scheduled monument; The 17th-century Stydd Hall built on the site is Grade II* listed.

== History ==
=== Founding: 12th and 13th century ===
The Preceptory was founded in 1190 following Ralph Foun's gift of the Benedictine Hermitage at Yeaveley to the Knights Hospitaller; this gift included 'lands, waters, woods, mills, and other appurtenances', which surrounded the village. Ralph's gift, however, came with two conditions: first, that the current hermit, known only as "Robert, son of Richard", be allowed to remain at the hermitage for his lifetime, and who should act as steward of the estate. The second condition Ralph set was that the Knights Hospitaller would receive him "clad in the habit of their order, whenever he wished, either in sickness or in health".

The preceptory was around a mile west of the village of Yeaveley; it was fortified and was surrounded by a moat fed by a stream. Adjacent fishponds provided a regular supply of food.

In 1251, King Henry III granted the Hospitallers "free warren" over the manor of Yeaveley. In 1268 the Preceptory gained its dedication to Saint Mary and Saint John the Baptist. The Preceptory appears to have gained a substantial landed estate, and wealth, through patronage and local benefaction. The Preceptory also profited from the dissolution of the Knights Templar; acquiring their lands in Temple Normanton, Derbyshire.

=== 14th century ===
The Preceptory gained somewhat of a reputation for fraud and abusing their privileges during the 13th and 14th centuries. The preceptory gained land in Compton on the outskirts of the town of Ashbourne, Derbyshire; but the Hospitallers were unpopular in the town (at the time a Royal Borough), and the complaints are recorded as early as 1276. Their privileges included certifying as correct the gallon and bushel measures: they abused this privilege by allowing their tenants to sell bread and bear in false measures. The Hospitallers were also able to extend their privileges, such as freedom from road and bridge tolls, to their tenants; this further aided their unpopularity as the royal borough of Ashbourne was seen to suffer as the Hospitallers increased their number of tenants and profiteered further. Similar dodgy dealings occurred in 1330 when a brother of the order, William Brix, slammed the door of the manor house at Barlow in the face of the Sheriff's Officer who had come to check the order's weights and measures.

By 1338 the Preceptory is being described as a bailiwick; at time, the gross income of the Preceptory was £95 6s.; expenditure is recorded as £63 6s, leaving a "handsome balance" of £32. £52 of this income came from in rents from their tenants; £20 10s. from offerings and donations. The Preceptory's largest expense was that of hospitality: the Preceptory and their guests got through 72 quarters of wheat, 84 quarters of barley and £10 of meat and fish within the year; their horses consuming 120 quarters of oats during the same period. The estate at Barlow was assessed separately, as it had yet to be formally annexed to the Preceptory; it recorded a gross income of £36 7s. and a post expenditure balance of £23 6. 8d. A second separate estate at Barrow upon Trent, known as Barrow Camera provided an income of £30; this estate was annexed formally at some point prior to 1433.

=== 16th century ===
Following its formal annexation prior to 1433, Barrow Camera appears to have become a key part of the Preceptory: between the years of 1503 and 1526 the Preceptory is repeatedly referred to as "The Joint Preceptory of Yeaveley and Barrow".

During the reign of King Henry VIII, the Preceptory was recorded as having an income of £107 3s. 8d. a year (equivalent to approximately 10 years average craftsman's wages). The 1535 Valor Ecclesiasticus, however, recorded the Preceptory of having no value at all: its income entirely used up in providing hospitality, distributing alms to the poor, supporting the chaplains, and in celebrating the mass for dead benefactors. The Preceptor at this time is recorded as Sir Ambrose Cove, who occupied the manor house at "Yeveley Stydde".

The Preceptory was suppressed during the Dissolution of the Monasteries; The Preceptory and its property and lands were confiscated in 1543 and granted by Henry VIII to Charles Blount, 5th Baron Mountjoy.

After the Dissolution, the Commander of Yeaveley and Barrow was elected "Lieutenant-Turcopolier of Malta."

== Benefactors ==
The Preceptory became a site of significant local benefaction:

- The Foun family, who gave the initial donation for the preceptory's foundation, continued its support: Oliver Foun donating more lands at Yeaveley.
- Further land in the village of Yeaveley were donated by William Montgomery.
- Margery de Carun donated lands and tenements in the village of Longford, Derbyshire.
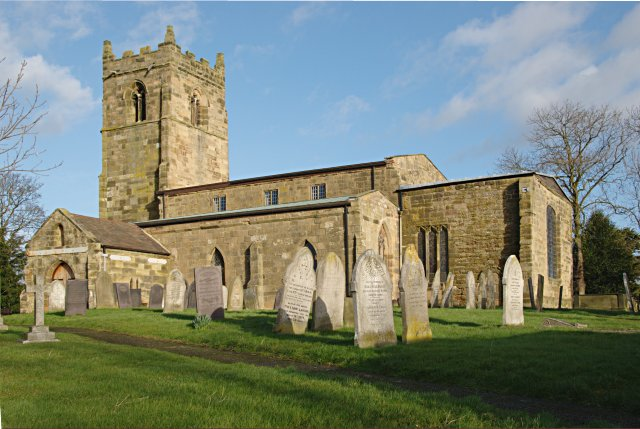
  Barrow upon Trent church
- Robert de Bakepuze donated the Church, and some land at Barrow upon Trent during the reign of King Henry II; his son, John, confirmed this grant and donated further lands. In return, Mass was sung for Robert's soul in the Preceptory chapel every Sunday. This land was used for the formation of Barrow Camera.
- Ascuit Musard donated the Moiety title (half) of the Church of Staveley, Derbyshire.
- Walter Abitot donated 22 acres of land (with associated common rights) at Barlow, Derbyshire.
- William Meynell is also described as "a considerable benefactor".

== The Preceptory today ==
Of the Preceptory buildings, only part of the Preceptory's chapel still remains; these ruins date from the early 13th century and are Grade I listed. The north wall of the chapel still stands to the former roof height, and retains three pointed-arch windows, and the remains of a further two adjacent. Remains inside the chapel include fluted columns, and, on the outside, carvings of human heads and oak leaves. Further remains of the other Preceptory buildings are buried, whilst parts of the foundations and stonework of part of the domestic buildings have been reused in Stydd Hall, which was later built on the site and sits in the centre of the moated enclosure; the current Hall was built in the 17th century and is Grade II* listed.

== See also ==
- Grade I listed buildings in Derbyshire
- Listed buildings in Yeaveley
- Waingroves Preceptory
