= Edlaston =

Village in Derbyshire, England

Coordinates: 52.981°N 1.730°W

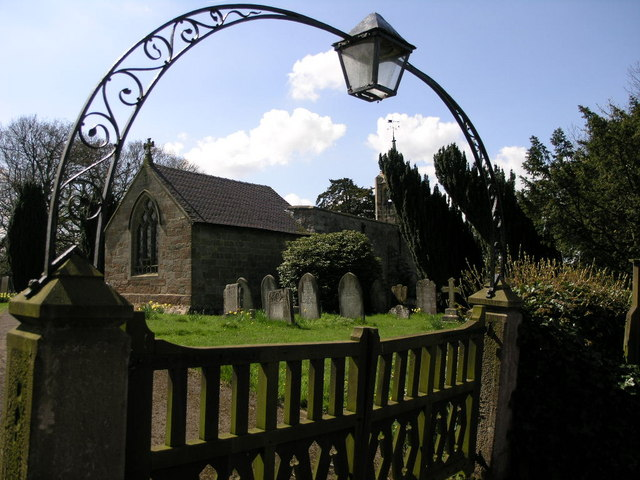
- St James' Church, Edlaston

- Location within Derbyshire
- Population: 220 (2011) ^{(with Wyaston)}
- OS grid reference: SK176429
- Civil parish: Edlaston and Wyaston
- District: Derbyshire Dales
- Shire county: Derbyshire
- Region: East Midlands
- Country: England
- Sovereign state: United Kingdom
- Post town: ASHBOURNE
- Postcode district: DE6
- Police: Derbyshire
- Fire: Derbyshire
- Ambulance: East Midlands

Edlaston is a village three miles south of Ashbourne in Derbyshire, just off the A515 road. It is in close proximity to the hamlet of Wyaston, and the civil parish is called Edlaston and Wyaston. It had a population of 220 at the 2011 Census.

It is very rural as the land is light and stony with a clay subsoil, which is suitable for dairy pasture. The village consists of a few farms and cottages and a traditional stone built public house The Shire Horse on the outer east edge of the village. To the west of the village is Edlaston Hall. It and its outbuildings have been converted to multiple dwellings.

== History ==
Edlaston is mentioned in Domesday book as "Dulvestune", and later "Edolveston", meaning "Eadwulf's farm".

The manor of Edlaston was given to the prior and convent of Tutbury by Earl Ferrers, son of the founder. After the Reformation it was granted by Henry VIII in 1548 to William Paget, who a year afterwards sold it to Sir Edward Aston. Later it belonged to the Eyres of Hassop Hall and was sold by Rowland Eyre to Daniel Morley of Ashbourne, later bought by the Rev Thomas Gisborne of Yoxall in Staffordshire. A small common of 20 acres was enclosed in 1824. It was recorded by 1848 as containing 16 houses with 92 inhabitants. John Harrison from Snelston Hall was by then the lord of the manor and principal owner.

Many of the houses were rebuilt and have a common gothic style. There was an infant school in the village built in 1845, which was later converted into a residence. Harrison and Sir Peter Walker of the Walker-Okeover baronets from Osmaston manor, were main landowners by the very end of the 19th century.

The church of St. James has a chancel, nave, south porch and a square wooden turret which has bells. The 14th century masonry is complemented by windows and a roof of a later date. The church was repaired in 1682 and 1840, and was restored and reseated in 1870. The rectory is a nearby small mansion for church purposes, along with a glebe.

Robert Kaye Greville, a notable botanist did many drawings here in Edlaston and Wyaston as a child as his father, Robert Greville, was the local rector.

== See also ==
- Listed buildings in Edlaston and Wyaston
