= Craspedoporus =

Scientific classification
- Domain: Eukaryota
- Clade: Diaphoretickes
- Clade: Sar
- Clade: Stramenopiles
- Phylum: Gyrista
- Subphylum: Ochrophytina
- Class: Bacillariophyceae
- Order: incertae sedis
- Genus: †Craspedoporus; Greville, 1863

Species
- Craspedoporus briggeri R.Ross & P.A.Sims; Craspedoporus corolla J.Brun; Craspedoporus elegans Grove & Sturt; Craspedoporus johnsonianus Greville; Craspedoporus pantocsekii Brun; Craspedoporus ralfsianus Greville; Craspedoporus reticulatus N.I.Hendey & P.A.Sims; Craspedoporus rotaradiatus Hendey & P.A.Sims; Craspedoporus truanii Pantocsek

Genus of single-celled organisms

Craspedoporus is a genus of diatoms known from the fossil record. It first appears in the middle Eocene, and exists until the late Miocene.
