= Aria arvonicola =

Conservation status
- Critically Endangered (IUCN 3.1)

Scientific classification
- Kingdom: Plantae
- Clade: Tracheophytes
- Clade: Angiosperms
- Clade: Eudicots
- Clade: Rosids
- Order: Rosales
- Family: Rosaceae
- Genus: Aria
- Species: A. arvonicola

Binomial name
- Aria arvonicola (P.D.Sell) Sennikov & Kurtto
- It is endemic to Great Britain

Synonyms
- Pyrus arvonicola (P.D.Sell) M.F.Fay & Christenh.; Sorbus arvonicola P.D.Sell

Species of flowering plant

Aria arvonicola, called the Menai Strait whitebeam or Cerddin Menai, is a whitebeam species in the rose family. It is native to a restricted area along the shore of the Menai Strait in North Wales. The species was first described by Peter Sell in 2014 and has been assessed by the IUCN as critically endangered.

== Description ==
Aria arvonicola is an up to 10 m (33 ft) tall tree.

== Taxonomy ==
The earliest record of the species is an herbarium specimen collected by William Hunt Painter in 1879. It was noted as a distinct species by Rich (2010) who listed it as "Sorbus un-named taxon", however the species was not formally described until 2014.

== Distribution and habitat ==
Aria arvonicola is found preferentially growing in areas with limestone bedrock along the southern shore of Menai Strait most often in open woodland or high woodlands habitats. The native range along the strait is restricted to a 10 m (33 ft) wide strip along the shore encompassing no more than 0.1 km^{2} (24.7 acres). Some individual plants grow along the beach line, with roots exposed to the air or growing down into the beach shingle and immersed in saltwater during high tides.

== Conservation ==
The highly restricted native range puts the species at risk of extinction due to rising sea level induced habitat erosion. The majority of known specimens are growing within the North Wales Wildlife Trust's Nantporth Nature Reserve and thus granted conservation protection from the reserve. A total of thirty mature to nearly mature specimens were known as of 2017 and the population has been assessed as currently stable, with an abundant fruiting season documented in 2014. Additionally, two seed bank collections are maintained including one at the Millennium Seed Bank in Wakehurst Place, and an immature specimen, raised from a seedling, was planted in the National Botanic Garden of Wales whitebeam grove in 2019.
