= Rodsley =

Village in Derbyshire, England

Coordinates: 52.960°N 1.700°W

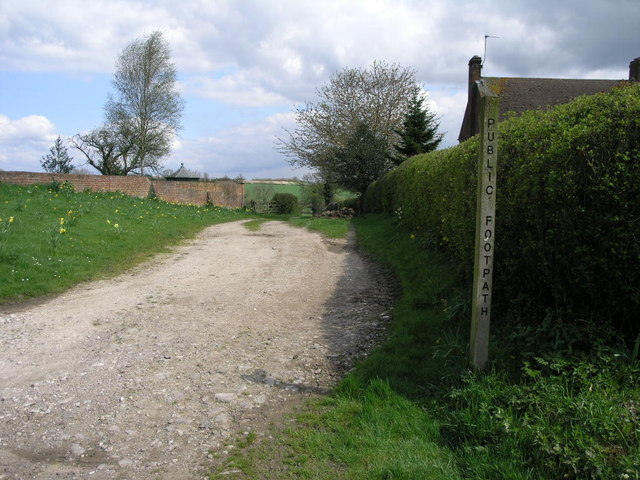
- Footpath to Shirley. This is just one of a web of footpaths that pass through Rodsley.

- Location within Derbyshire
- OS grid reference: SK202403
- District: Derbyshire Dales
- Shire county: Derbyshire
- Region: East Midlands
- Country: England
- Sovereign state: United Kingdom
- Post town: ASHBOURNE
- Postcode district: DE6
- Dialling code: 01335
- Police: Derbyshire
- Fire: Derbyshire
- Ambulance: East Midlands
- UK Parliament: Derbyshire Dales

Rodsley is a small village and civil parish about 4 miles (6 km) south of Ashbourne in Derbyshire. As the population of the village was less than 100 at the 2011 Census, details are included in the civil parish of Yeaveley.

== History ==
Nearby Hollington and Rodsley (then spelt Redeslei or Redlesleie) are included as manors in the 1086 Domesday Survey as belonging to Henry de Ferrers, who was given a large number of manors in Derbyshire. His descendants became the Earls of Derby and still owned land in Shirley in the nineteenth century. Mention is also made of the abbey of Burton as having an interest.

In 1881, Rodsley had a population of 136 people.

It has been calculated that in 1901, Rodsley represented the population centre of Britain. This centre has been travelling southwards through Longford (in 1911) and was lying somewhere near Appleby Parva on the Derbyshire to Leicestershire border in 2000.

== Notable residents ==
Saint Ralph Sherwin was born here in 1550. He was canonised (declared a saint) in 1970 and his feast day is 1 December – the day he died in 1581.

== See also ==
- Listed buildings in Rodsley
