= Listed buildings in Shirley, Derbyshire =

Shirley is a civil parish in the Derbyshire Dales district of Derbyshire, England. The parish contains 16 listed buildings that are recorded in the National Heritage List for England. Of these, two are listed at Grade II*, the middle of the three grades, and the others are at Grade II, the lowest grade. The parish contains the village of Shirley and the surrounding countryside. Most of the listed buildings are houses, cottages and associated structures, farmhouses and farm buildings. The other listed buildings include a church, a cross in the churchyard, a public house, and a former saw mill with an adjacent shed.

== Key ==
Grade	Criteria
II*	Particularly important buildings of more than special interest
II	Buildings of national importance and special interest

== Buildings ==
Name and location	Photograph	Date	Notes	Grade
St Michael's Church; 52.97185°N 1.67550°W		14th century	The north aisle was added in 1840–42 by H. I. Stevens, who also added the tower in 1860–61. The church is built in sandstone with lead roofs, and consists of a nave, north and south aisles, a south porch, a chancel, and a west tower. The tower has three stages with chamfered string courses between them, angle buttresses, two-light west windows in the lower stages, and a clock face on the south front. The top stage contains two-light bell openings with Y-tracery, and at the top are embattled parapets and corner pinnacles. Reset in the east wall of the north aisle is a 12th-century carved stone.	II*
The Old Rectory; 52.97153°N 1.67546°W		14th century	The rectory, later a private house, has been much altered. It is in sandstone and red brick, and has a tile roof with coped gables and plain kneelers. There are two storeys and an L-shaped plan. In the west front is a central doorway with a stone lintel and a shallow curved hood. The windows are casements, those in the ground floor with wedge lintels. Inside, there are remnants, possibly from the 14th century.	II
Thatched Cottage; 52.97145°N 1.67714°W		17th century	The cottage has a timber framed core, and it has been encased in brick and pebbledashed. There is a single storey and attics, and two bays. In the centre is a doorway flanked by casement windows, and above are two gabled dormers. Inside there is exposed timber framing.	II
The Hall; 52.97292°N 1.67321°W	—	17th century (probable)	A farmhouse with a timber framed core that has been incorporated into a larger house with a square plan, encased in red brick and sandstone, and with a tile roof. The east front has quoins, the ground floor is in sandstone and contains a six-light windows, and the upper floor is in brick and has a blocked window. The south front has two gables, and contains two three-light casement windows with segmental heads. The west front has three irregular bays, the ground floor is in brick and the upper floor is tile hung. It contains a recessed porch with a Gothic arch. There is some exposed timber framing on the exterior and inside the house.	II
Yew Tree Cottage; 52.96637°N 1.67855°W		17th century	The cottage has a timber framed core, and it has been encased and rendered. The cottage has a thatched roof, a single storey and attics, and a front of three bays. The windows are casements, and there are three eyebrow dormers.	II
The Saracen's Head Public House; 52.97122°N 1.67608°W		1791	The public house is in painted brick with a tile roof. There are two storeys and four bays, the right bay gabled and slightly projecting. The doorway has a fanlight, and above it is a single-light window. The other windows are casements, in the ground floor with three lights and segmental heads, and in the upper floor with two lights.	II
Old Vicarage; 52.97702°N 1.67329°W	—	1824 (possible)	The house is in rendered brick with a hipped tile roof. There are two storeys and an L-shaped plan. The south front has four bays, and on the west front are five bays, the two left bays slightly recessed. On the front is a porch and a doorway with a fanlight, and the windows are sashes.	II
Shirley Mill Farmhouse; 52.96490°N 1.68415°W		Early 19th century	The farmhouse is in red brick with a dentilled eaves band and a tile roof. It consists of a main range with three storeys, a double depth plan, and three bays, and a two-storey two-bay range to the right. In the centre of the main range is a doorway with a fanlight, and the windows are sashes with wedge lintels and double keystones. In the right range is a lean-to porch, and casement windows under segmental arches. Attached to the north is the partly demolished mill.	II
Terrace of three cottages 52.97133°N 1.67570°W		Early 19th century	A pair of cottages and a barn, later three cottages, in red brick with a Welsh slate roof. There are two storeys and four bays. The doorway and windows, which are casements, have segmental-arched heads, and there are half-blocked vents in the former barn.	II
The Outlook; 52.98455°N 1.67210°W		Early 19th century	The cottage is in red brick, and has a tile roof with decorative fretted bargeboards, a single storey, and attics. On the east front is a gabled porch, and the windows have diamond glazing, some with hood moulds.	II
Saw Mill; 52.98240°N 1.69247°W		c. 1845	The former water-powered saw mill was designed by H. I. Stevens in picturesque style, and is built into a hillside. It is in limestone with sandstone dressings, and a stone slate roof with overhanging eaves supported on moulded wooden brackets. On the side is an open timber shelter with stone piers containing a large overshot waterwheel. The windows are recessed, chamfered and mullioned, and contain diamond lights, there are gabled roof dormers, and on the west gable is a ventilator. Attached to the east is a curved dam wall and an ornamental cascade.	II*
Seasoning shed 52.98230°N 1.69259°W	—	c. 1845	The seasoning shed to the west of the saw mill was designed by H. I. Stevens. It is an open shed consisting of six iron posts supporting a pitched stone slate roof.	II
Cow House, Shirley Hall; 52.97320°N 1.67230°W	—	Mid-19th century	The cow house is in red brick with a tile roof. There is a single storey and a T-shaped plan. It contains windows with chamfered surrounds and Gothic-arched heads, doorways with segmental heads and chamfered surrounds, and patterned brick arches.	II
Stable block, Shirley Hall; 52.97312°N 1.67299°W	—	Mid-19th century	The stable block is in red brick with a tile roof, and has a single storey with a hayloft, and an L-shaped plan. It contains windows with chamfered surrounds and Gothic-arched heads, doorways with segmental heads and chamfered surrounds, and patterned brick arches. Above is a gabled dormer with a segmental-arched granary opening.	II
Stable block, The Old Rectory; 52.97159°N 1.67516°W	—	19th century	The former stable block is in red brick with a tile roof. There are two storeys and three bays. It contains four doorways with three windows above, and there are stone steps on the west leading to an upper doorway. Inside there are two cruck trusses.	II
Churchyard cross 52.97176°N 1.67561°W		Undated	The cross in the churchyard of St Michael's Church is in sandstone. It consists of three square steps, on which is the tapering base of the cross and the lower part of the octagonal shaft.	II
