= Barrow Camera =

Knights Hospitaller foundation in Derbyshire, England

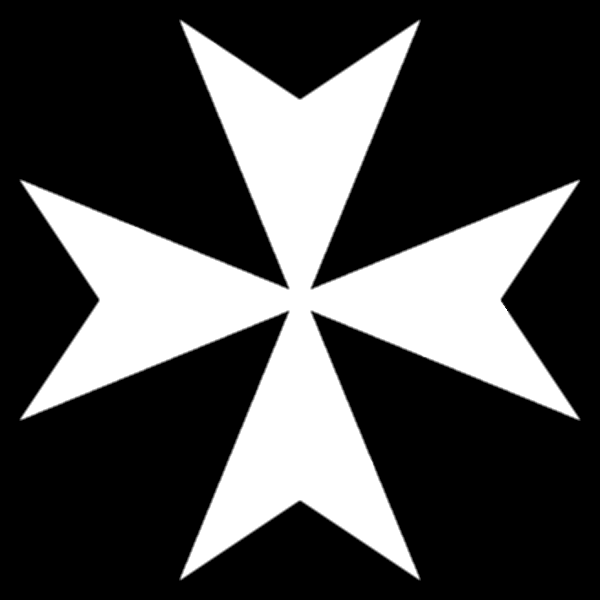
- Cross of the Knights Hospitaller

- Location within Derbyshire
- Interactive map of Barrow Camera

Monastery information
- Other names: The Joint Preceptory of Yeaveley and Barrow
- Order: Knights Hospitaller
- Established: Donation of land made in the reign of King Henry II (1154-1189)
- Disestablished: 1543
- Mother house: Yeaveley Preceptory

People
- Founder: Founded following donation by Robert de Bakepuze

Site
- Location: Arleston, Barrow upon Trent, Derbyshire, England, United Kingdom.
- Coordinates: 52.863°N 1.501°W
- Visible remains: Remains incorporated into Arleston House Farmhouse.
- Public access: Arleston House Farmhouse is private property.

Barrow Camera was a Knights Hospitaller foundation in the parish of Barrow upon Trent, Derbyshire, England.

A Camera is: "A residence used during short visits by an official and attendants of the Knights Hospitallers for administrative purposes on their estates."

Barrow Camera was in the hamlet of Arleston in the parish of Barrow upon Trent in Derbyshire, however, several historians have mistaken it for the village of Barrow in Cheshire. The Camera's position in Derbyshire is confirmed by connections with other religious institutions in Derbyshire, and by records showing their annual rent was paid to the Bishop of Carlisle, who was Lord of the Manor of Barrow upon Trent.

== History ==
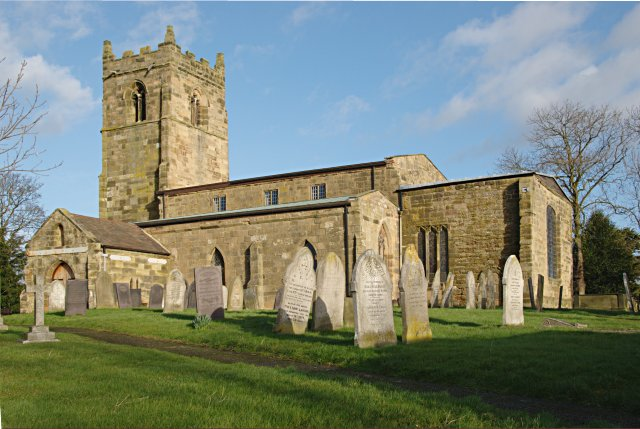
Barrow Upon Trent Church construction began under the care of the Knights Hospitaller.

During the reign of King Henry II (1154-1189), Robert de Bakepuze donated the church and some land at Barrow upon Trent to the Knights Hospitaller of Yeaveley Preceptory, also in Derbyshire. This donation was confirmed by Robert's son, John, who also donated further lands. In return, Mass was sung for Robert's soul in the Preceptory chapel every Sunday. By 1338 the camera is recorded as having a bailiff and an income of £30; Page, however, believed that it was "doubtful if regular brethren of the order were ever resident here".

At some point prior to 1433, the camera was formally annexed to Yeaveley Preceptory. It appears to have become a key part of the Preceptory: between the years of 1503 and 1526 the Preceptory is repeatedly referred to as "The Joint Preceptory of Yeaveley and Barrow".

The Preceptory and Camera were suppressed during the Dissolution of the Monasteries; its property and lands were confiscated in 1543 and granted by Henry VIII to Charles Blount, 5th Baron Mountjoy.

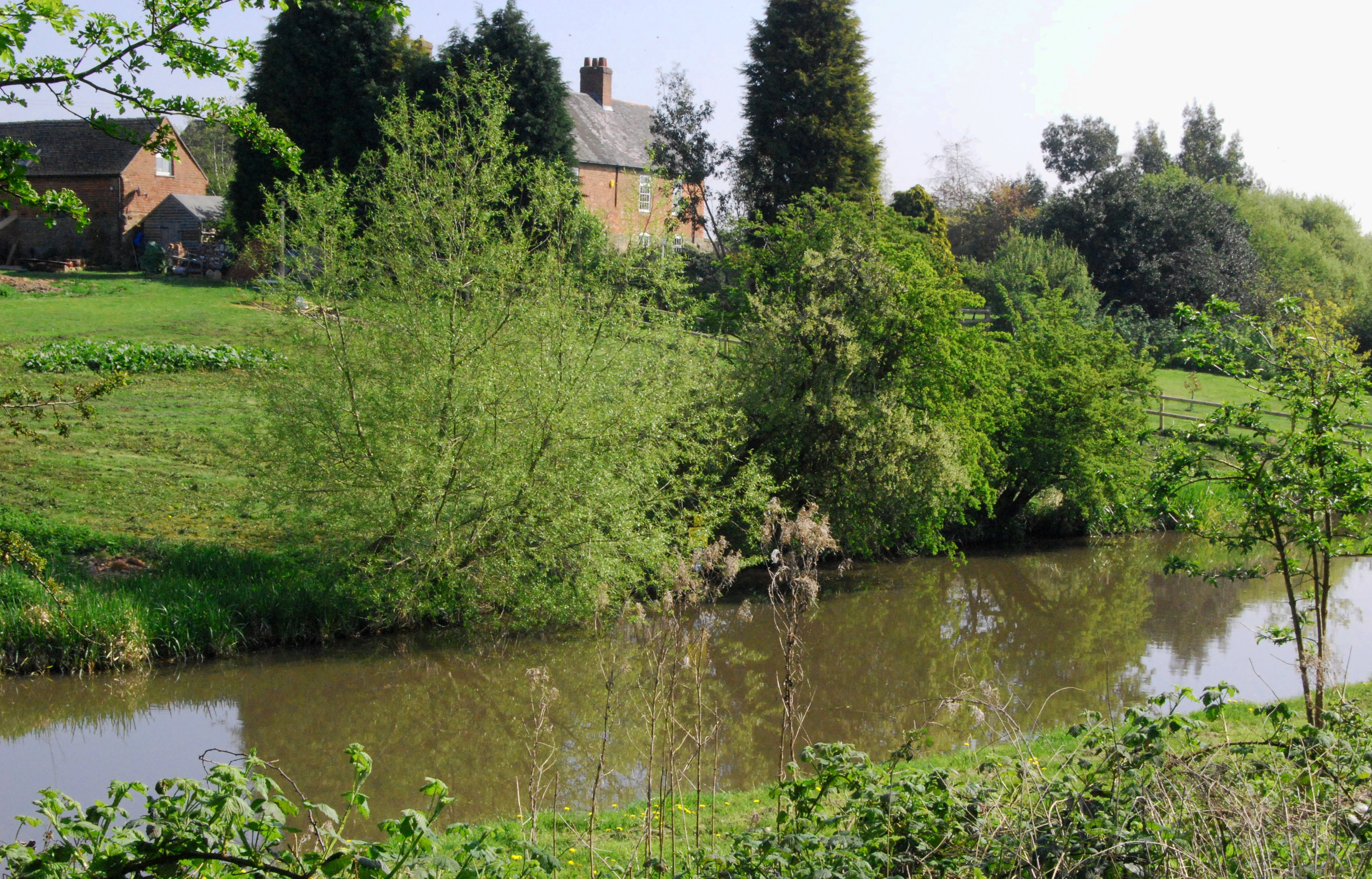
Areleston House from across the Trent and Mersey Canal.

After the Dissolution, the Commander of Yeaveley and Barrow as elected "Lieutenant-Turcopolier of Malta."

== Architectural history ==
The Camera itself was built in the hamlet of Arleston, in the Parish of Barrow upon Trent, on the site of the current Arleston House.

Writing at the end of the 19th century, Cox describes that a "substantial stone-built basement", of 14th century origins, still existed, which Cox recorded as being 75 ft by 21 ft. This was the basement of a large hall, which had been supported by buttresses. Following the Dissolution were incorporated into Arlestone House Farmhouse which was constructed in the 16th–17th century, and is currently Grade II Listed.

== See also ==
- Arleston
- Barrow upon Trent
- Yeaveley Preceptory
