= Holy Trinity Church, Yeaveley =

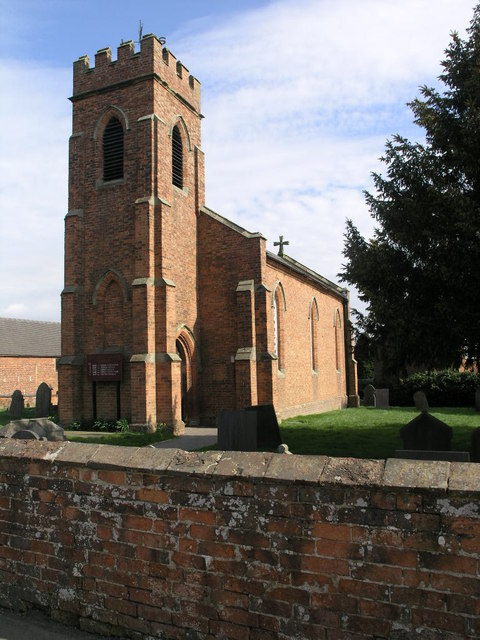
- Holy Trinity Church, Yeaveley
- Holy Trinity Church, Yeaveley
- 52.9597°N 1.7239°W
- OS grid reference: SK 18642 40293
- Location: Yeaveley, Derbyshire
- Country: England
- Denomination: Church of England

History
- Dedication: Holy Trinity

Architecture
- Heritage designation: Grade II listed
- Groundbreaking: 8 August 1839
- Completed: 1840

Administration
- Province: Canterbury
- Diocese: Derby
- Archdeaconry: Derby
- Deanery: Ashbourne
- Parish: Yeaveley

Holy Trinity Church, Yeaveley is a Grade II listed parish church in the Church of England in Yeaveley, Derbyshire.

== History ==
The foundation stone was laid on 8 August 1839 by Revd. W. A. Shirley, and the church opened in 1840. It was built of red bricks in Flemish bond with stone and moulded brick dressings.

== Parish status ==
The church is in a joint parish with

- All Saints' Church, Brailsford
- St James' Church, Edlaston
- St Martin's Church, Osmaston
- St Michael's Church, Shirley

== See also ==
- Listed buildings in Yeaveley
