= Richard Paget Murray =

English clergyman, botanist and lepidopterist (1842–1908)

Richard Paget Murray (1842, Isle of Man – 1908, Shapwick, Dorset) was an English clergyman, botanist and lepidopterist.

After secondary education at King William's College, he matriculated in 1864 at Corpus Christi College, Cambridge. There he graduated with a B.A. in 1868 and an M.A. in 1871. He was ordained a deacon in 1868 and a priest in 1869.

His herbarium contained plants from Ireland, the Canary Islands, Mauritius, Portugal, France, the Alps and the Dolomites. With Edward Francis Linton, William Richardson Linton and William Moyle Rogers he issued the exsiccata series British Rubi, in dried specimens. Specimens dispersed after his death are held by several institutions including the Natural History Museum (London) and Kew Gardens.

He was elected a Fellow of the Linnean Society in 1882.

== Works ==
Arthur Cayley The standard author abbreviation R.P.Murray is used to indicate this person as the author when citing a botanical name.

partial list

- Murray, Rev. R. P., 1873. Descriptions of new Species of Exotic Rhopalocera. Ent. mon. Mag. 10: 107–108.
- Murray, Rev. R. P., 1873. Description of a new Japanese species of Lycaena, and change of name of L. cassioides Murray. Ent. mon. Mag.. 10: 126.
- Murray, Rev. R. P., 1874a. Descriptions of some new species belonging to the genus Lycaena. Trans. ent. Soc. Lond. 22(4): 523–529, 1 pl.
- Murray, Rev. R. P., 1874b. Some notes on Japanese butterflies with descriptions of new genera and species. Ent. mon. Mag. 11:166–172.
- paper in the Journal of Botany, British and Foreign.
