= Listed buildings in Yeaveley =

Yeaveley is a civil parish in the Derbyshire Dales district of Derbyshire, England. The parish contains nine listed buildings that are recorded in the National Heritage List for England. Of these, one is listed at Grade I, the highest of the three grades, one is at Grade II*, the middle grade, and the others are at Grade II, the lowest grade. The parish contains the village of Yeaveley and the surrounding countryside. The oldest listed building in the parish consists of the remains of a preceptory of the Knights Hospitaller. The other listed buildings are houses and associated structures, farmhouses and farm buildings, and a church.

== Key ==
Grade	Criteria
I	Buildings of exceptional interest, sometimes considered to be internationally important
II*	Particularly important buildings of more than special interest
II	Buildings of national importance and special interest

== Buildings ==
Name and location	Photograph	Date	Notes	Grade
Remains of the Chapel of St Mary and St John the Baptist; 52.95706°N 1.74533°W		Early 13th century	The remains of the preceptory of the Knights Hospitaller to the south of Stydd Hall are in sandstone, capped by tiles. All that has survived is part of a wall on a plinth, containing three lancet windows with chamfered surrounds, continuous moulded hood moulds, and sill bands. It also contains a low doorway with a segmental head, and nook shafts with carved foliage capitals.	I
Stydd Hall and wall 52.95732°N 1.74534°W		Late 16th century (probable)	The house is in sandstone and red brick on a stone plinth, with stone dressings, quoins, floor bands, a moulded eaves cornice, embattled parapets with ridgeback copings, and a slate roof. There are three storeys and a basement, and a square plan, with fronts of three bays, and a small two-storey tower to the north. On each front, steps lead up to a central doorway with pilasters, a fanlight, and a moulded entablature. The doorways are flanked by two-storey canted bay windows with embattled parapets. Most of the other windows are mullioned or mullioned and transomed. Attached to the tower is a high garden wall, in brick on the west side and stone on the east, with flat stone coping.	II*
Malt House Farmhouse; 52.95975°N 1.72273°W	—	Mid 17th century	The farmhouse, which was extended in the 19th century, has a timber framed core, later encased in red brick, with a floor band, and a tile roof. There are two storeys and an L-shaped plan, consisting of three bays, the right bay projecting as a gabled wing. The doorway and the windows, which are a mix of sashes and casements, have segmental heads. Inside, there is exposed timber framing.	II
Wheatsheaf Farmhouse and cowshed 52.96062°N 1.72406°W	—	17th century	The farmhouse is in red brick, with a floor band, and a tile roof with a coped gable to the south. There are two storeys and three bays, and the windows are casements. Attached to the north is a single-storey cowshed.	II
Yeaveley House; 52.96007°N 1.72392°W	—	1750	A farmhouse in red brick with stone dressings, a sawtooth eaves cornice, and a tile roof with moulded gable copings and kneelers. There are two storeys, and an L-shaped plan, with a front range of three bays. The doorway, which has a fanlight, and the windows, which are sashes, have segmental heads. In the east gable is a datestone, and the front garden is enclosed by a low wall with railings.	II
Outbuilding northeast of Stydd Hall; 52.95768°N 1.74470°W	—	Mid 18th century	The outbuilding is in red brick with stone dressings and a tile roof. There are two storeys and three bays. In the centre is a segmental arch with some quoins in the jambs, imposts and a keystone. This is flanked by doorways with quoined surrounds and semicircular-headed lintels. The windows are oval, cut out of square stone blocks, and on the north gable wall are external steps.	II
Barn southeast of Yeaveley House; 52.95993°N 1.72363°W	—	Mid 18th century	The barn is in red brick with a tile roof. There are two storeys and three bays. The openings include segmental-headed doorways and windows, two square hayloft openings, and slit vents.	II
Top Stydd Farmhouse; 52.96562°N 1.74913°W		Late 18th century	Two cottages later combined into one farmhouse, it is in red brick with a dentilled eaves band and a tile roof. There are three storeys, two bays, and a two-storey single-bay extension to the west. The doorways and the windows, which are casements, have segmental heads.	II
Holy Trinity Church; 52.95973°N 1.72386°W		1839–40	The church is in red brick with a slate roof, and consists of a three-bay nave and a west tower. The tower has two stages, stepped clasping buttresses, and a south doorway with a pointed arch and a hood mould. The bell openings are lancets with chamfered surrounds, and above them is a moulded string course, and an embattled brick parapet with stone copings. On the sides of the nave are three lancet windows with chamfered surrounds and cast iron tracery, and the east window has a four-centred arched head and contains Y-tracery.	II
