= St Michael's Church, Shirley =

St Michael’s Church, Shirley
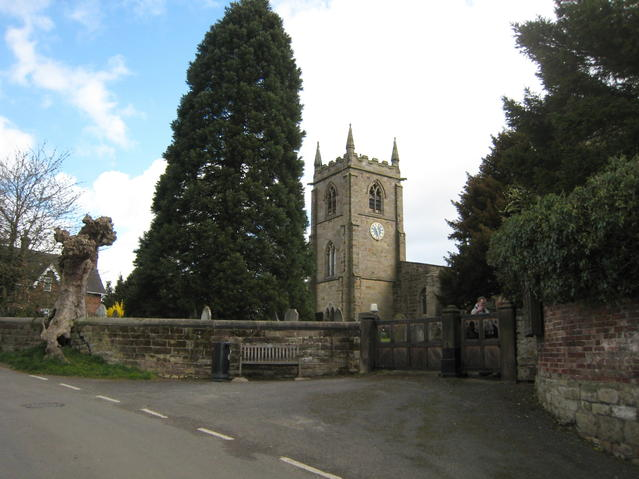
- St Michael’s Church, Shirley
- St Michael’s Church, Shirley
- 52°58′16.74″N 1°40′36.6″W
- OS grid reference: SK 21887 41656
- Location: Shirley, Derbyshire
- Country: England
- Denomination: Church of England

History
- Dedication: St Michael

Architecture
- Heritage designation: Grade II* listed

Administration
- Province: Canterbury
- Diocese: Derby
- Archdeaconry: Derby
- Deanery: Ashbourne
- Parish: Shirley

St Michael's Church, Shirley is a Grade II* listed parish church in the Church of England in Shirley, Derbyshire.

== History ==
The church dates from the 14th century. The north aisle was rebuilt in 1842 by Henry Isaac Stevens and the pews were placed. It re-opened on 5 April 1842 when all present were struck with the accuracy, simplicity and devotional effect of the singing by the parishioners of Shirley and Longford, who had been instructed for only a few months on the Wilhelm system, thereby proving its applicability to the improvement of congregational psalmody.

The foundation stone for the new tower of the church was laid on 8 September 1860 by Francis Wright of Osmaston Manor The designs were by Henry Isaac Stevens of Derby and the contractor was J.W. Thompson of Exeter Street, Derby.

On 27 January 1861, a number of the children in the church were overcome by fumes from the heating flue that passed under the floor. Fortunately, there were no fatalities.

== Parish status ==
The church is in a joint parish with

- All Saints' Church, Brailsford
- St James' Church, Edlaston
- St Martin's Church, Osmaston
- Holy Trinity Church, Yeaveley

== Organ ==
A pipe organ was built by George Holdich and opened on 19 April 1857. A specification of the organ can be found on the National Pipe Organ Register.

== Bells ==
The church tower contains 3 bells, one dating from ca. 1560 by Ralph II Heathcote, and two from 1688 by William Noone.

== See also ==
- Grade II* listed buildings in Derbyshire Dales
- Listed buildings in Shirley, Derbyshire
