= Craspedoporus elegans =

Scientific classification
- Domain: Eukaryota
- Clade: Sar
- Clade: Stramenopiles
- Division: Ochrophyta
- Clade: Bacillariophyta
- Class: Bacillariophyceae
- Order: incertae sedis
- Genus: †Craspedoporus
- Species: †C. elegans

Binomial name
- †Craspedoporus elegans Grove & Sturt 1886

Species of single-celled organism

Craspedoporus elegans is an extinct marine species of diatom from a deposit from Oamaru, Otago, New Zealand.
