= Listed buildings in Rodsley =

Rodsley is a civil parish in the Derbyshire Dales district of Derbyshire, England. The parish contains five listed buildings that are recorded in the National Heritage List for England. All the listed buildings are designated at Grade II, the lowest of the three grades, which is applied to "buildings of national importance and special interest". The parish contains the village of Rodsley and the surrounding countryside, and the listed buildings consist of three farmhouses, a private house and a barn.

== Buildings ==
Name and location	Photograph	Date	Notes
Bay Tree Farmhouse and pump 52.95914°N 1.70081°W	—	17th century	The farmhouse contains a fragment of timber framing, and is otherwise in red brick with a tile roof. There is a single storey with attics, and three bays. The doorway and the windows, which are casements, have segmental heads, and in the attic are three gabled half-dormers. To the south is a 19th-century pump with a weatherboarded stem, an iron handle and a stone trough.
Rodsley House; 52.95933°N 1.70102°W	—	Late 17th century	The house was extended in the late 18th century. The early part is timber framed with brick nogging, and the extension to the left is taller, and in red brick with stone dressings. Both parts have two storeys and two bays. The later part has a rendered stone plinth, sill bands, a modillion cornice, and stone coped gables. The doorway has a moulded surround, a divided fanlight, and a fluted entablature with roundels. The windows are sashes, and have wedge lintels with incised voussoirs, and double keystones. The windows in the original part are casements, and inside is a large inglenook fireplace with a chamfered bressummer, and wattle and daub panels.
Corner Farmhouse; 52.96148°N 1.70231°W	—	Early 18th century	The farmhouse was extended in about 1880. The early part is in partly rendered and partly painted brick with brick dressings, and the later wing is in red brick with painted stone dressings and a dogtooth eaves band; both parts have tile roofs and two storeys. The early part has two bays, a segmental-headed doorway and casement windows, and the later wing has three bays, a doorway with a fanlight and sash windows. Inside, there are two large inglenook fireplaces.
Rodsleywood; 52.96607°N 1.70730°W	—	Early 18th century	A farmhouse that was extended to the south in the late 18th century and to the north in the mid-19th century, forming a cruciform plan. It is in red brick, partly rendered, and has tile roofs with stone coped gables and moulded kneelers. The original part has two storeys and attics, and the extensions are without attics. The doorway and the windows, which are casements, have segmental heads.
Barn, Corner Farm; 52.96132°N 1.70256°W	—	Mid-18th century	The barn is in red brick with a dogtooth eaves band, and a tile roof with stone coped gables. It is mainly in a single storey, with a two-storey extension to the north. The barn contains a tall segmental arch with impost blocks, various doorways and windows, a square hayloft opening, and vents in a diamond pattern.
