= Ralph Sherwin (priest) =

English Roman Catholic saint (1550–1581)

Saint Ralph Sherwin

Martyr
- Born: 25 October 1550; Rodsley, Derbyshire
- Died: 1 December 1581 (aged 31); Tyburn, London, England
- Venerated in: Roman Catholic Church
- Beatified: 29 December 1886, Rome by Pope Leo XIII
- Canonized: 25 October 1970, Rome by Pope Paul VI
- Feast: 1 December (individual with his two companions); 25 October (collectively with Forty Martyrs of England and Wales)
- Attributes: Banner with his last words Jesu, Jesu, esto mihi Jesus!, noose in neck, martyr's palm

Ralph Sherwin (25 October 1550 – 1 December 1581) was an English Roman Catholic priest, executed in 1581. He is a Catholic martyr and saint.

== Early years and education ==
Sherwin was born at Rodsley, Derbyshire to John and Constance Sherwin and christened in Longford church. He was educated at Eton College. In 1568, he was nominated by Sir William Petre to one of the eight fellowships which he had founded at Exeter College, Oxford, probably influenced by Sherwin's uncle, John Woodward, who from 1556 to 1566 had been rector of Ingatestone, Essex, where Petre lived. A talented classical scholar, Sherwin obtained his Bachelor of Arts in 1571 and Master of Arts on 2 July 1574, and the following year converted to Roman Catholicism. He soon made for the English College at Douai, where he was ordained a priest by the Bishop of Cambrai on 23 March 1577. On 2 August 1577, he left for Rome, where he stayed at the English College, Rome for nearly three years. On 18 April 1580, Sherwin and thirteen companions left Rome for England as missionaries. He got into England in early August and started his successful ministry in different parts of the country but not for long.

== Prison and death ==
On 9 November 1580, he was arrested while preaching in the house of Nicholas Roscarrock in London and imprisoned in the Marshalsea, where he converted many fellow prisoners, and on 4 December was transferred to the Tower of London, where he was twice tortured on the rack and then laid out in the snow. Later he was put into an isolation cell, without food. He is said to have been personally offered a bishopric by Elizabeth I if he converted, but refused. After spending a year in prison he was finally brought to trial with Edmund Campion on a charge of treasonable conspiracy. He was convicted in Westminster Hall on 20 November 1581. Eleven days later he was taken to Tyburn on a hurdle along with Alexander Briant and Edmund Campion, where the three martyrs were hanged, drawn and quartered. On the scaffold Ralph Sherwin again "professed his innocence, proclaimed his Catholic faith, and prayed for the Queen". Sherwin's last words were "Iesu, Iesu, Iesu, esto mihi Iesus!"

== Veneration ==
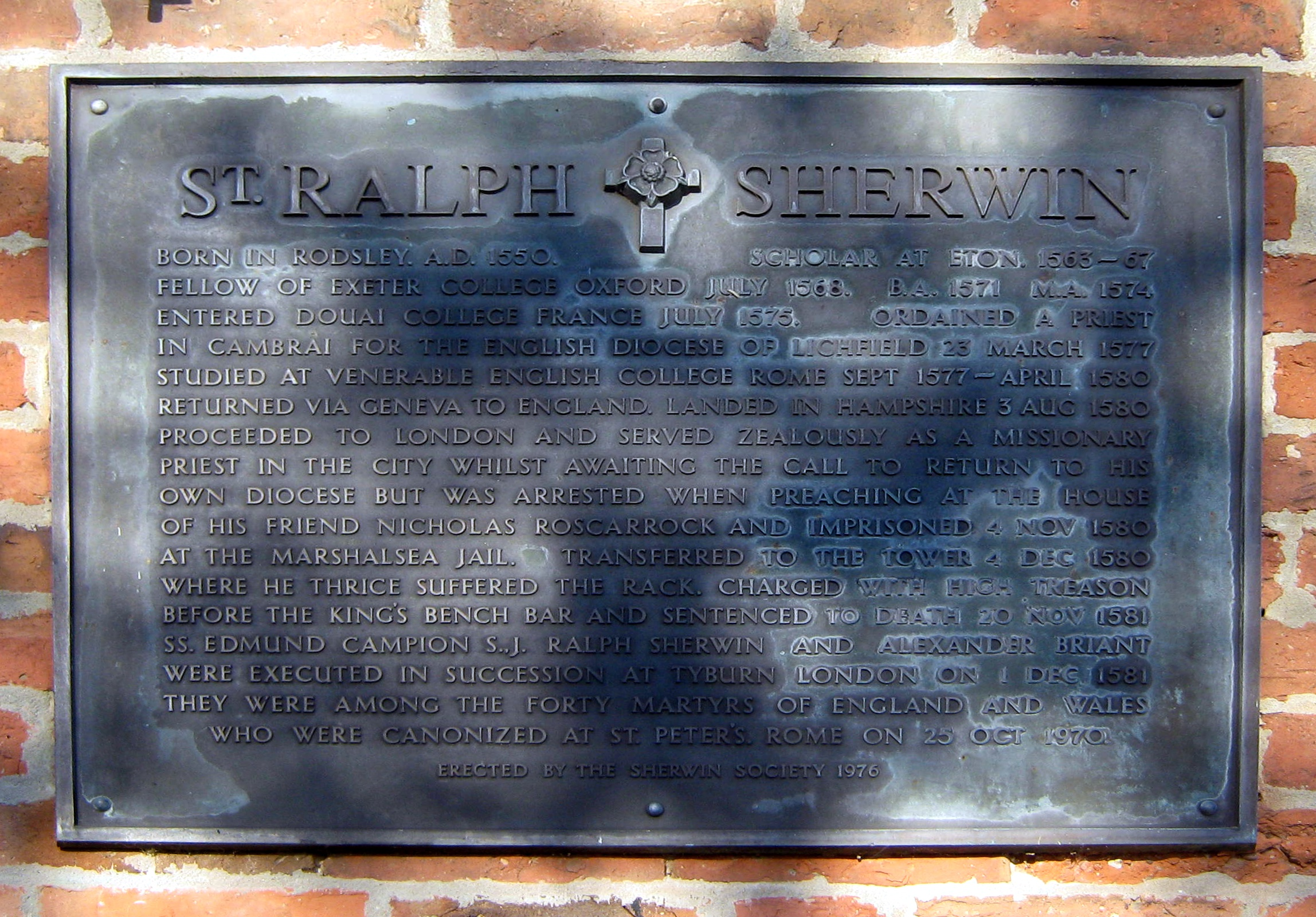
A plaque in his birthplace erected by the Shewin Society

Sherwin was the first member of the English College in Rome to be martyred. During the years 1581–1681 over forty more students were martyred for their faith. He was beatified on 29 December 1886 by Pope Leo XIII. He was canonised on 25 October 1970 by Pope Paul VI as one of the Forty Martyrs of England and Wales with a common feast day of 4 May (England) or 25 October (Wales). His individual feast day is celebrated on 1 December, the day of his martyrdom.

A Catholic church in the Chellaston area of Derby, registered in January 1981, was dedicated to Ralph Sherwin. The church was demolished in 2018 to make space for a Lidl supermarket.

There is a Sherwin Football Club based in the Normanton area of Derby. Founded in 1973, the club provides football and social opportunities for all ages and both genders in the local community. The club colours are purple with yellow trim.
