= Wyaston =

Hamlet in Derbyshire, England

Coordinates: 52.979°N 1.727°W

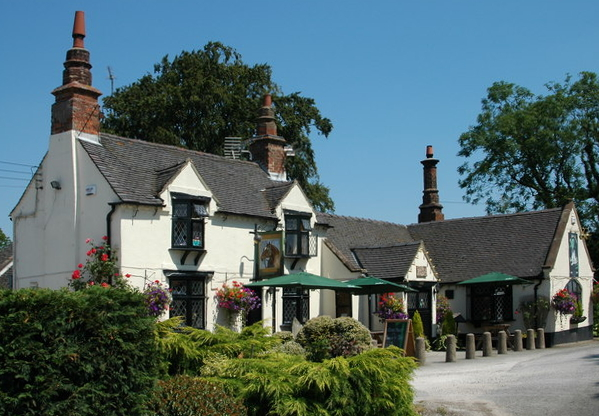
- The Shire Horse, Wyaston

- Location within Derbyshire
- OS grid reference: SK184424
- Civil parish: Edlaston and Wyaston
- District: Derbyshire Dales
- Shire county: Derbyshire
- Region: East Midlands
- Country: England
- Sovereign state: United Kingdom
- Post town: ASHBOURNE
- Postcode district: DE6
- Police: Derbyshire
- Fire: Derbyshire
- Ambulance: East Midlands

Wyaston is a hamlet in Derbyshire, England. It is located 3 miles south of Ashbourne.

Wyaston is in the civil parish of Edlaston and Wyaston. This is 1/4 mile (1/2 km) southeast of Edlaston, both have a long history as separate townships, yet they form a single, if dispersed village.

The parish contains some of the highest land locally, the parish peak of 180 metres (590 ft) is by the central road junction in Wyaston.

A community hall is in use at Wyaston village.

== History ==
The village was recorded in Domesday, as Widerdestune, meaning 'Wīgh(e)ard's farm'. It once was a township in the parish, and although less prominent because of the church at Edlaston, it eventually became the larger settlement, with 25 houses and 122 inhabitants by 1848. A key landowner of the time was William Greaves. Wyaston House was described at the time as a mansion and seat of Nathaniel Need. Wyaston Grove was occupied by Rev John Grundy. There was a Methodist chapel in the village until the 20th century.

== See also ==
- Listed buildings in Edlaston and Wyaston
