= St James' Church, Edlaston =

St James’ Church, Edlaston
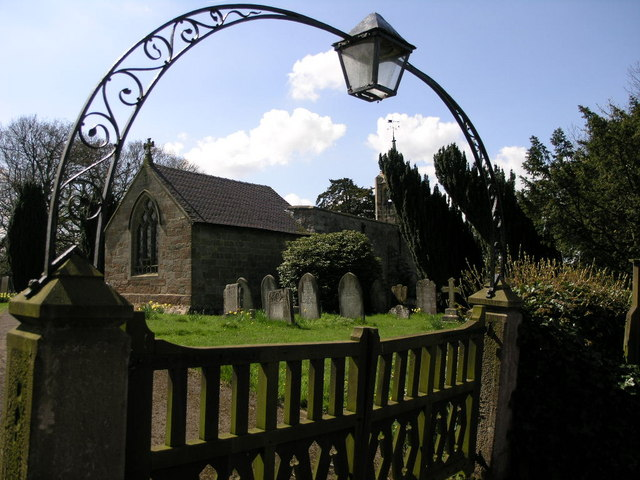
- St James’ Church, Edlaston
- St James’ Church, Edlaston
- 52°58′52.83″N 1°43′54.72″W
- OS grid reference: SK 18118 42674
- Location: Edlaston, Derbyshire
- Country: England
- Denomination: Church of England

History
- Dedication: St James

Architecture
- Heritage designation: Grade II* listed

Administration
- Province: Canterbury
- Diocese: Derby
- Archdeaconry: Derby
- Deanery: Ashbourne
- Parish: Edlaston

St James’ Church, Edlaston is a Grade II* listed parish church in the Church of England in Edlaston, Derbyshire.

== History ==
The church dates from the 14th century. The nave was probably rebuilt in 1682 as this date is carved on a stone in the east wall outside.

At the end of the 18th century, the rector was Robert Greville. He and wife Dorothy had a son Robert Kaye Greville who was brought up in the village. He would be a leading botanist and abolitionist.

In 1870 the gallery in the nave was removed, and oak benches installed in place of the wooden pews. The floor was paved throughout and the aisles and chancel laid with Minton encaustic tiles. Choir stalls were built and a new altar table and altar rails provided. This restoration was funded by the rector, Rt. Revd. Bishop Edmund Hobhouse and executed by the contractor Mr. Thorley of Ellastone. The church reopened on 28 October 1870.

On 25 July 1900, the cornerstone was laid for a major restoration by the architect E. Arden Minty, FRIBA, of 39 Victoria Street, Westminster the brother of the rector at the time, and the builder William Gould of Tutbury.

In 1906, when the Rev. F. Arden Minty was walking to the altar, the floor suddenly gave way beneath him, but he managed to avoid falling into the hole. It was subsequently found that the arch of a large vault below the chancel had collapsed.

== Parish status ==
The church is in a joint parish with

- All Saints' Church, Brailsford
- St Martin's Church, Osmaston
- St Michael's Church, Shirley
- Holy Trinity Church, Yeaveley
