= William Richardson Linton =

English botanist

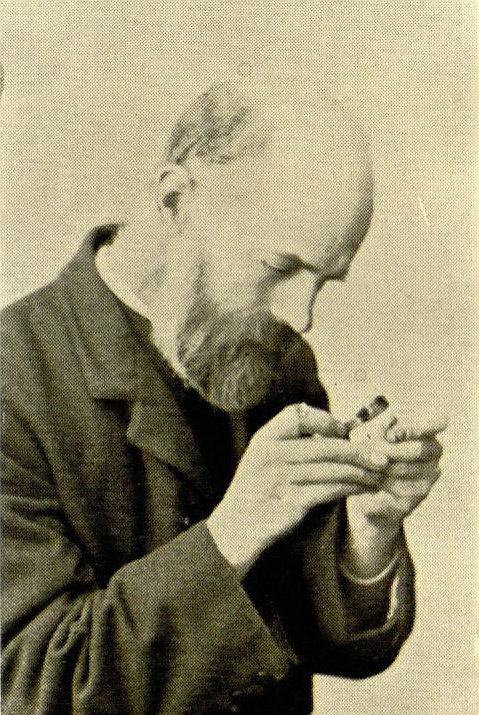
- Born: William Richardson Linton; 2 April 1850; Diddington, Huntingdonshire, England
- Died: 7 April 1908 (aged 58); Ashbourne, Derbyshire
- Citizenship: British
- Occupations: Botanist, vicar
- Spouse: Alice Shirley
- Children: Viola Marion Linton

Rev. William Richardson Linton (2 April 1850 in Diddington, Huntingdonshire – 7 April 1908 in Ashbourne, Derbyshire), Corpus Christi College, M.A., was an English botanist and vicar of the parish of Shirley, Derbyshire. He was regarded as one of the leading batologists of his day.

== Life ==
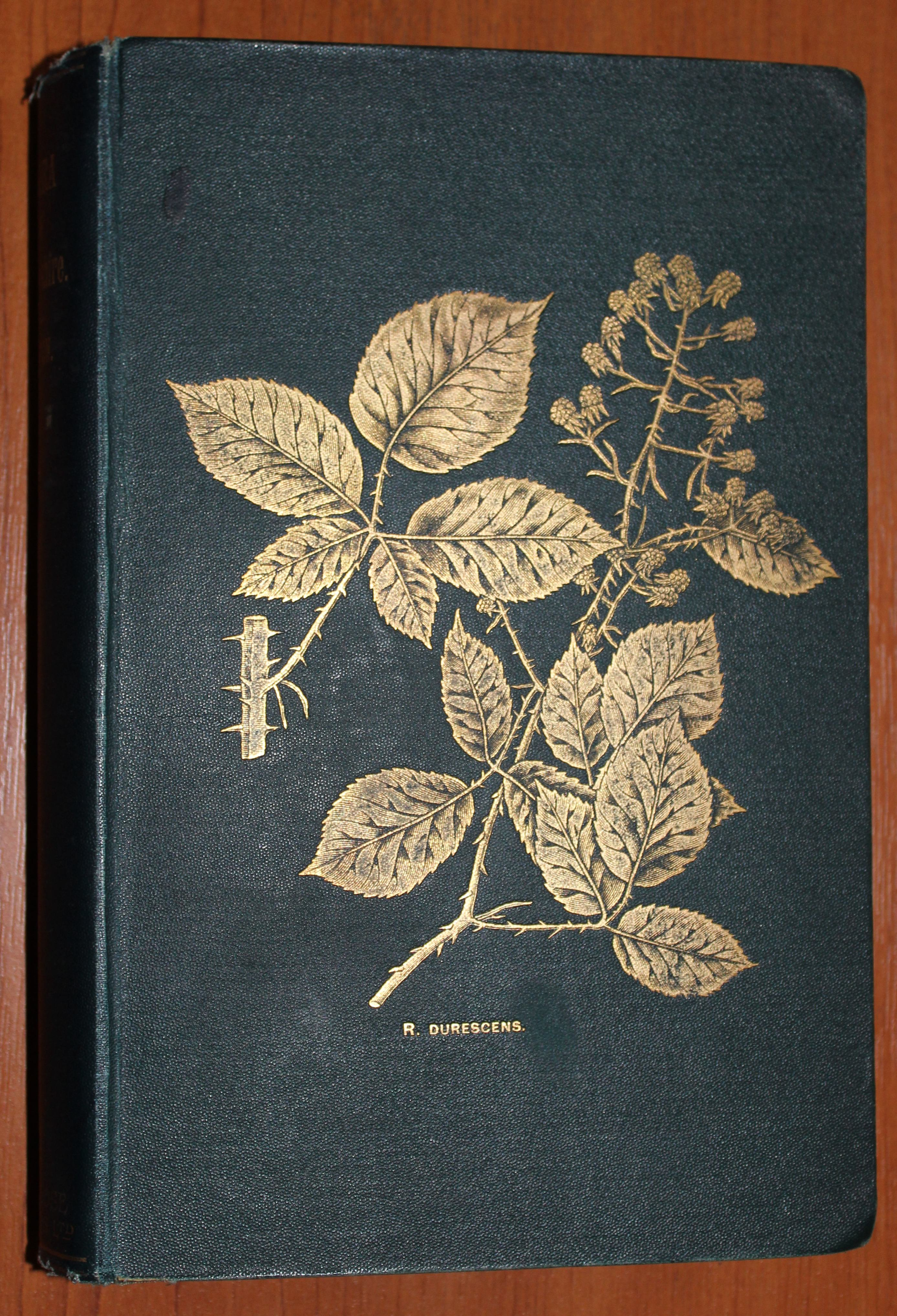
Linton's 1903 Flora of Derbyshire showing Rubus durescens on its cover in gold leaf

Linton was born in Diddington in Huntingdonshire in 1850.

He married Alice Shirley (daughter of Rev. Walter Waddington Shirley and Philippa Frances Emilia Knight Shirley) on 26 January 1887, with whom he had one daughter, Viola Marion Linton. He became the vicar of St Michael's church in Shirley.

Linton collected botanical specimens and records, often working with his elder brother who was also a cleric. (Rev. Edward Francis Linton was based mainly in Edmondsham in Dorset). In 1890 W.R.Linton published a short article in the Journal of Botany describing a new species of hawkweed (Hieracium holophyllum) found in Derbyshire. In 1892 he and his brother published a short eight page guide called Some Scottish Willows which they followed two years later with Set of British Willows. With Edward Francis Linton, Richard Paget Murray and William Moyle Rogers he issued the exsiccata series British Rubi, in dried specimens. Further exsiccatae he edited were: Sets of British Hieracia and Sets of British willows.

Linton wrote an extensive book about the flora of Derbyshire, published in 1903. The front cover of his Flora contained a large illustration in gold leaf of Rubus durescens, a species of bramble unique to Derbyshire which he had earlier discovered. Linton is credited with the first description of Rubus durescens. His Flora contained 1,030 species of flowering plants and ferns. He considered around 910 (88%) of these native, 70 (7%) aliens and 50 (5%) casuals. He also included mosses and liverworts. He included two maps of the county and two illustrations of plants he considered special in the area. In addition to the one shown on the cover, he also included a line drawing of Epipactis atroviridis, which he considered a species new to science that grew locally. The bramble is still recognised as a local species, but the orchid is no longer accepted as valid, and is probably just a form of the broad-leaved helleborine (Epipactis helleborine).

In 1905 Linton published An account of the British Hieracia. He died in 1908 in Ashbourne in Derbyshire. He and his wife, who died in 1911, are buried in the churchyard of St Michael's church in Shirley.

In 1969 Linton's Flora was brought up to date by a committee of local Derbyshire botanists, led by Professor A.R.Clapham as editor, and published by Derby Museum and Art Gallery. That work was itself further built upon and completely revised in 2015 by the publication of the fourth work to bear the name The Flora of Derbyshire, but which extensively references data collated by W.R.Linton, and contains a full biography of his botanical life and achievements.

== Books ==
- Flora of Derbyshire: Flowering Plants, Higher Cryptogams, Mosses and Hepatics, Characeae. London: Bemrose & Sons Ltd., 1903.

== See also ==
- A. R. Clapham
- William Hunt Painter
