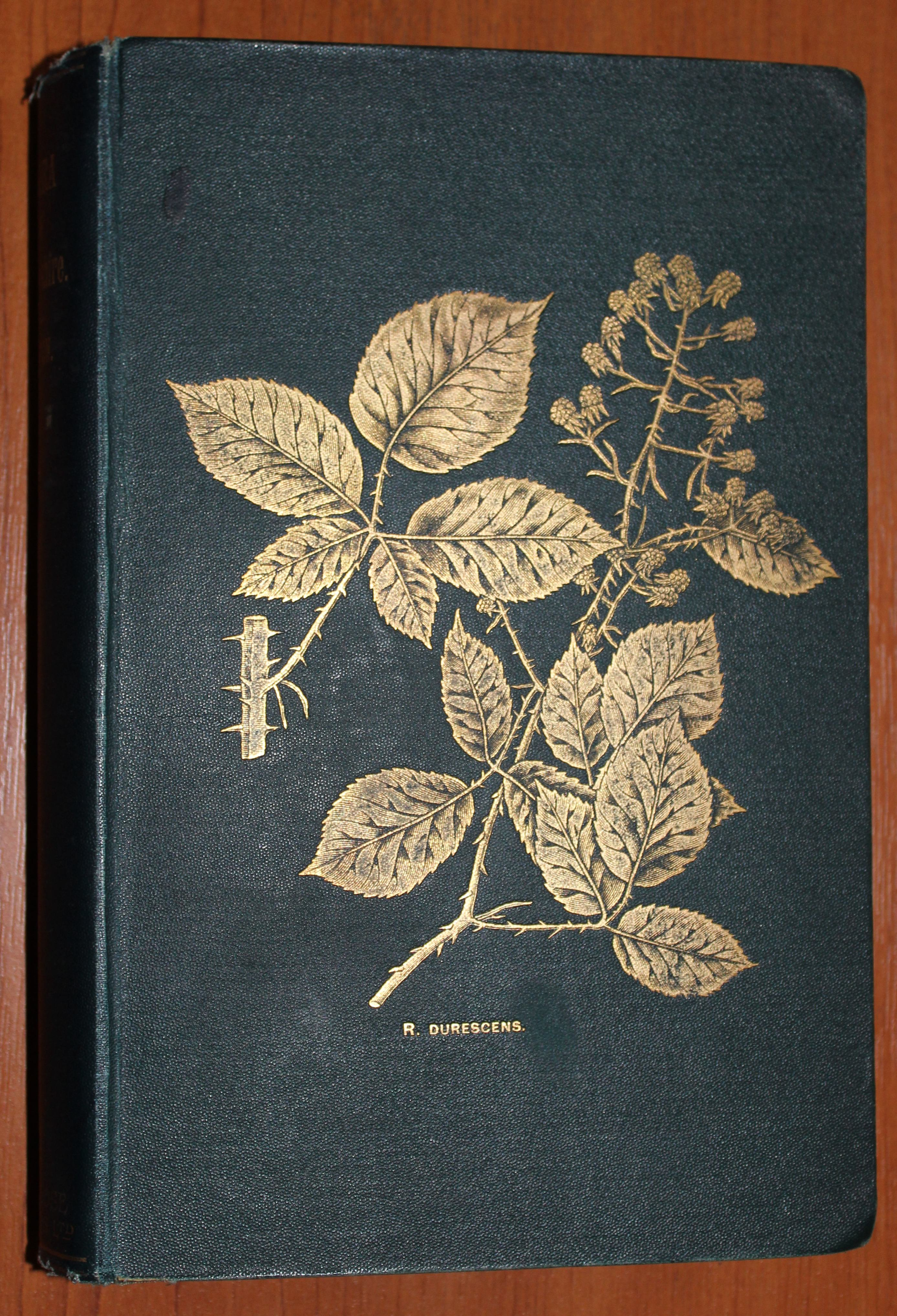
- Linton's 1903 The Flora of Derbyshire showing Rubus durescens in gold leaf

Scientific classification
- Kingdom: Plantae
- Clade: Tracheophytes
- Clade: Angiosperms
- Clade: Eudicots
- Clade: Rosids
- Order: Rosales
- Family: Rosaceae
- Genus: Rubus
- Species: R. durescens

Binomial name
- Rubus durescens W.R.Linton

= Rubus durescens =

Species of flowering plant

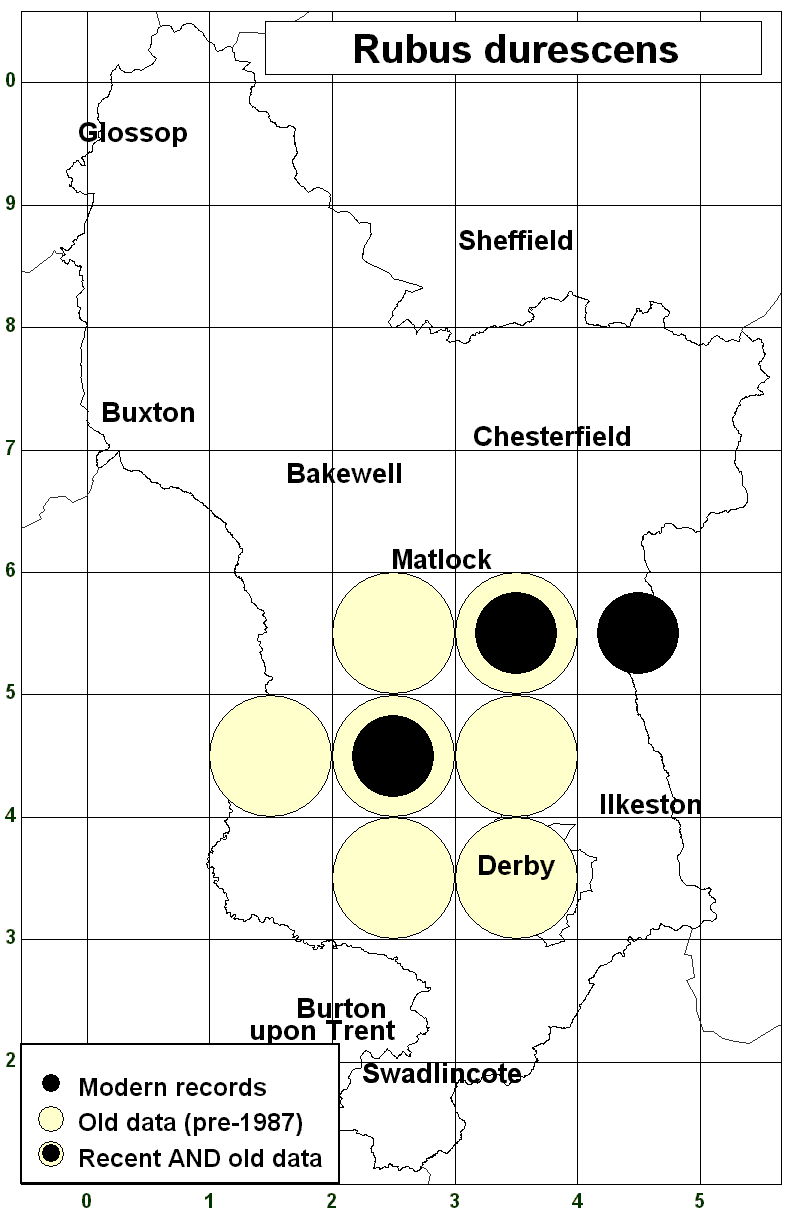
Derbyshire distribution map of Rubus durescens showing all known records plotted at an accuracy of 10 km x 10 km square

Rubus durescens is a rare British species of flowering plant in the rose family. It is native to England, where the entire global distribution of this bramble is found only within the southern half of the county of Derbyshire. It occurs in hedges, shrubs, wood and heathy areas, and was first described and named in 1892 by the Derbyshire botanist William Richardson Linton. Linton placed an illustration of the plant in gold leaf on the cover of the 1903 version of The Flora of Derbyshire, of which he was the sole author.

== Description and distribution ==
Rubus durescens has deep pink flowers and, according to Linton, "occurs in plenty over an area of some five miles by four to the north and east of Shirley". He recorded the species between Ambergate and Whatstandwell in the north of its range, through Bradley Wood and Duffield in the centre, down to between Church Broughton and Sutton on the Hill in the southern part of its range. The 1969 version of The Flora of Derbyshire, by A.R.Clapham, also noted the plant in Bradley Wood as well as near Cross o' th' Hands. The 2015 version of The Flora of Derbyshire noted that the plant's range had remained unchanged, listing locations at Mugginton Sand Quarry, Nether Heage, Lower Hartshay and Swanwick.

== Conservation status ==
Although many microspecies have no formal conservation status in the UK, Cheffings and Farrell in their 2005 Vascular Plant Red Data List for Great Britain suggested that all populations of local endemics such as Rubus should, when found in fewer than five 10 km (6.2 miles) × 10 km squares, be considered as "threatened". As a result, Rubus durescens is now included on the 2015 Derbyshire Vascular Plant Red Data List in the category "Nationally Rare".
