= William Hunt Painter =

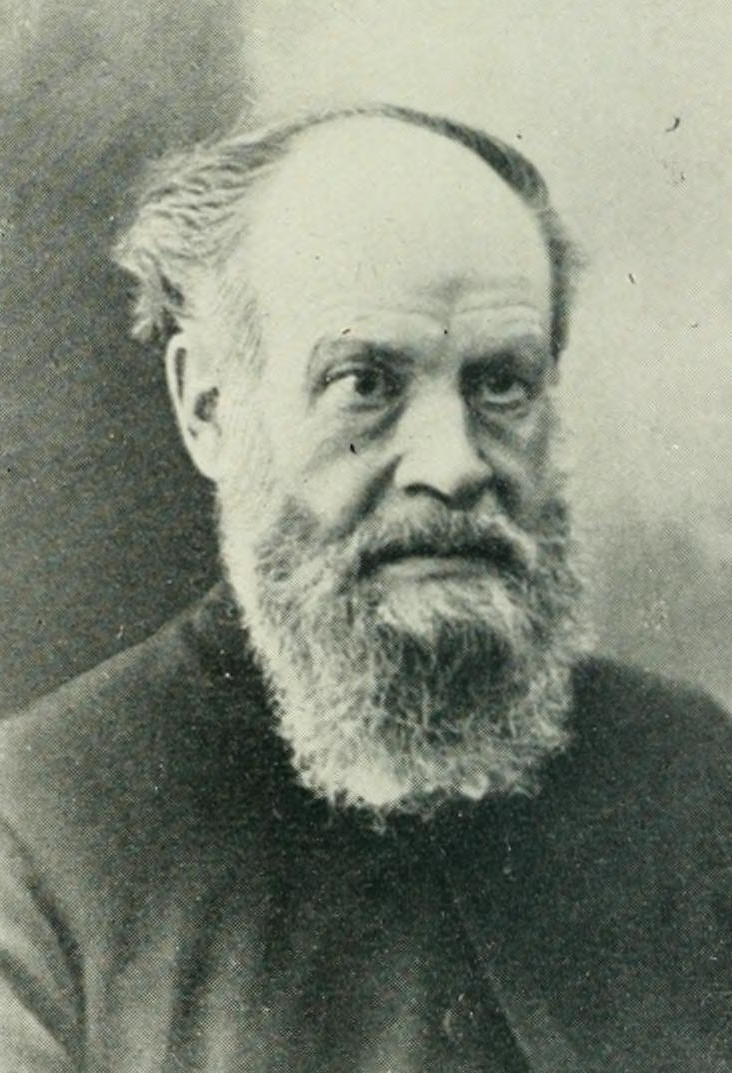
- Rev. W.H.Painter
- Born: 16 July 1835; Aston
- Died: 12 October 1910 (aged 75); Shrewsbury
- Employer: Church of England
- Known for: Flora of Derbyshire
- Spouse: Jane

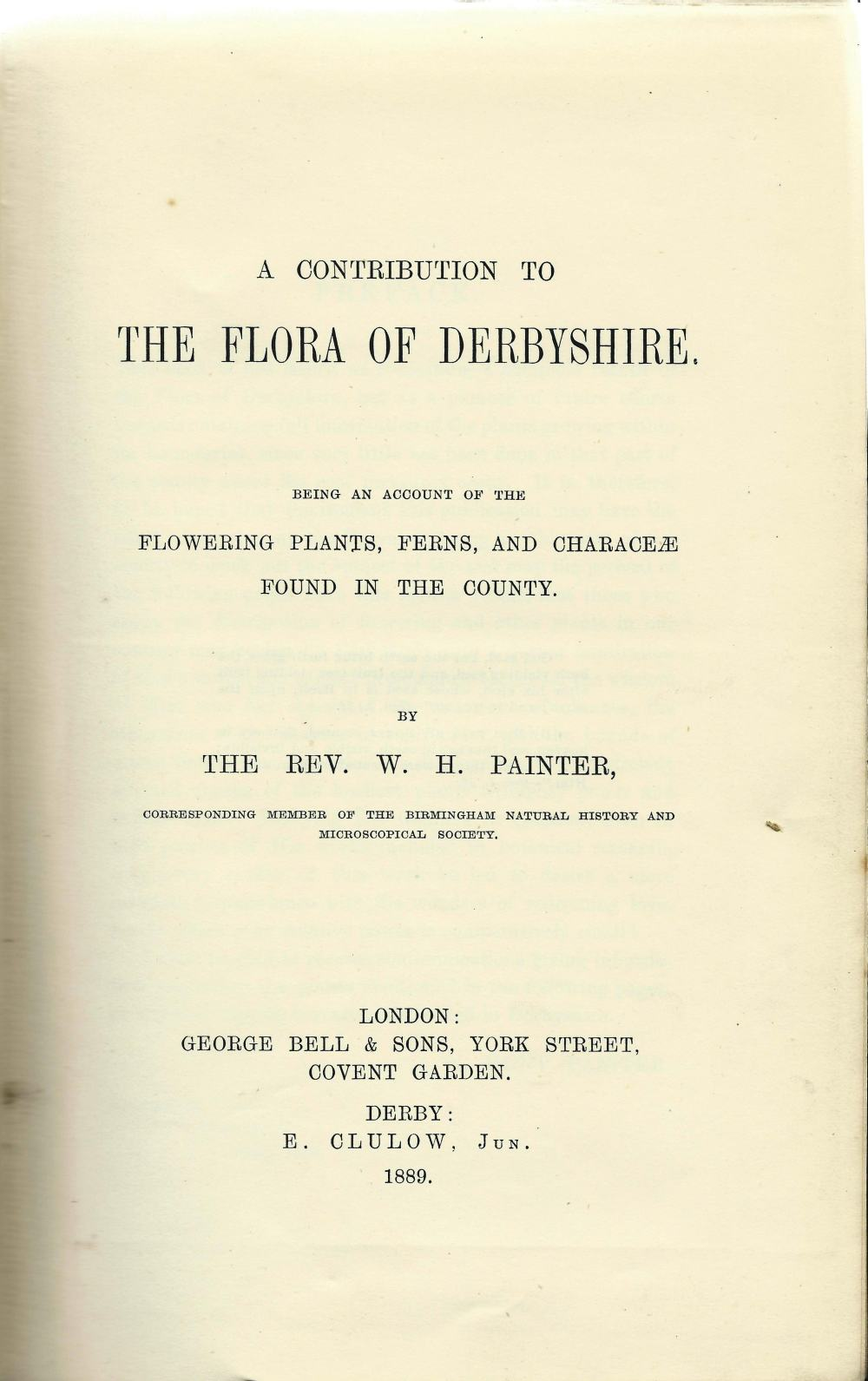
Painter's 1889 Flora of Derbyshire

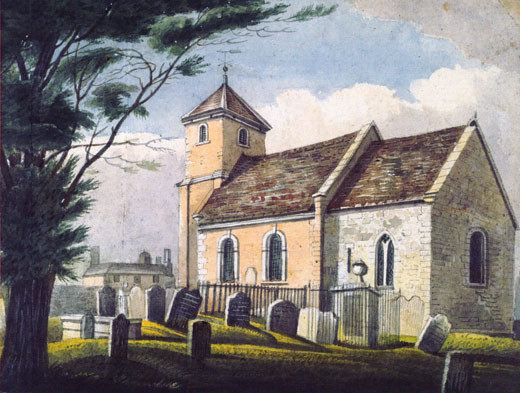
St James church in Stirchley by James Holmes Smith c. 1850

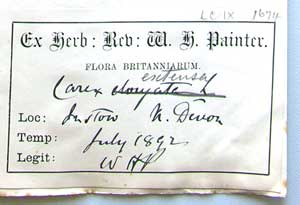
Herbarium label by W.H.Painter

William Hunt Painter (16 July 1835 – 12 October 1910) was an English botanist who made a significant contribution to the science of Derbyshire vascular plant flora. He was a keen and wide-ranging collector of plant specimens, and was a member of the Botanical Exchange Club. In 1889 he published the first in a series of four books, all by different authors and spanning 120 years, all called The Flora of Derbyshire.

== Life ==
William Hunt Painter was born in Aston, near Birmingham, on 16 July 1835. He was the eldest of five born to William, a haberdasher, and his wife Sarah, born Hawkes. His early career was in banking before he decided to join the Church of England. In 1861 he was staying in Chelsea, where he was a lay preaching assistant. Painter attended the Church Missionary Society College, Islington, where he would expect to be sent abroad by the Church Mission Society, but he ended up as a curate in Barbon in Westmoreland. It was here that he met (Rev) Robert Wood, who introduced him to botany.

In 1865, Painter became curate at High Wycombe, where he met James Britten, who had already published his first paper and was working in the herbarium for Kew Gardens. Despite Britten's emerging Catholic beliefs, the two would walk and talk together whilst indulging their interest in botany. Painter married Jane Stamps in 1871. In 1881 he and his wife were living in Bedminster, Somerset, where he was a curate.

Painter did much useful work on the flora of Derbyshire, publishing a lengthy paper in 1881, with supplementary notes in 1889. Together these formed the basis of Contributions to the Flora of Derbyshire, which was reviewed by the bryologist James Eustace Bagnall. Painter published a supplement to his work in The Naturalist, which indicated that he wanted to improve it. Bagnall was an acknowledged expert on mosses and was to publish a similar work to Painter's on the Flora of Warwickshire.

In 1891, Painter was a curate at Biddulph in Staffordshire. Then in 1894, he was appointed Rector of Stirchley in Shropshire. The rectory was modernised for his arrival, but his stay there was remembered for the maintenance he undertook on the church and buildings.

Whilst staying in Falmouth in the spring of 1898, Painter took up the study of mosses. From that time on they became the focus of his botanical interests. By travelling and swapping specimens he was able to write papers on the mosses of Derbyshire, Brecon, Falmouth and Cardiganshire. Painter remained in Stirchley until 1909, when his botanical and geological specimens were presented to University College, Aberystwyth before he retired to Shrewsbury. Painter died the following year and was buried in his church in Stirchley. On his death, the English Churchman said "[T]he Church of England has lost a faithful and devoted minister who was ever jealous for the maintenance of its Protestant principles".

William Hunt Painter donated his herbarium to the University College, Aberystwyth, but there are also significant specimen plants at Kew and Oxford, in the Department of Botany at Aberdeen, the Natural History Museum in London, the University of Birmingham, the National Botanic Garden at Dublin, the Derby Museum and Art Gallery, the University of Glasgow, the Hancock Museum at Newcastle upon Tyne, Kew, Manchester Museum, Cardiff and Oxford.

== Fumaria painteri ==
Painter was a keen collector and a member of the Botanical Exchange Club. There are few plants that are only found in Britain. One of the plants on this list is possibly Fumaria painteri or Painter's Fumitory. This flower has only been found twice, in 1905 and 1907, and in both cases it was found by Painter.

Plants of this description are not rare, as they occur naturally as hybrids, but the question is whether the discovered versions are fertile or merely another sterile hybrid. A search in 2006 determined that a new specimen had been found in 2005 but the experts failed to agree on the identification.

== See also ==
- A. R. Clapham
- William Richardson Linton
