= Robert Kaye Greville =

English mycologist, bryologist, and botanist (1794–1866)

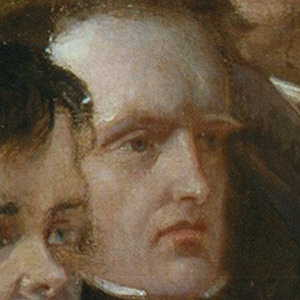
- Robert Kaye Greville in a detail from an 1840 painting.
- Born: 13 December 1794; Bishop Auckland, Durham
- Died: 4 June 1866 (aged 71); Murrayfield, Edinburgh
- Resting place: Dean Cemetery, Edinburgh
- Education: London and Edinburgh
- Occupation: Academic
- Known for: Polymath
- Spouse: Charlotte Eden
- Parent(s): Rev. Robert Greville and Dorothy Chaloner
- Scientific career
- Author abbrev. (botany): Grev.

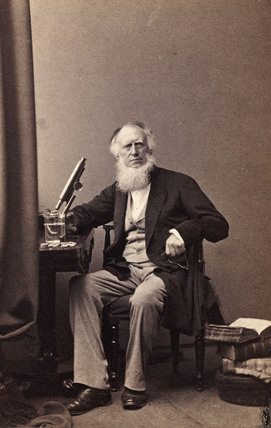
Robert Kaye Greville in old age

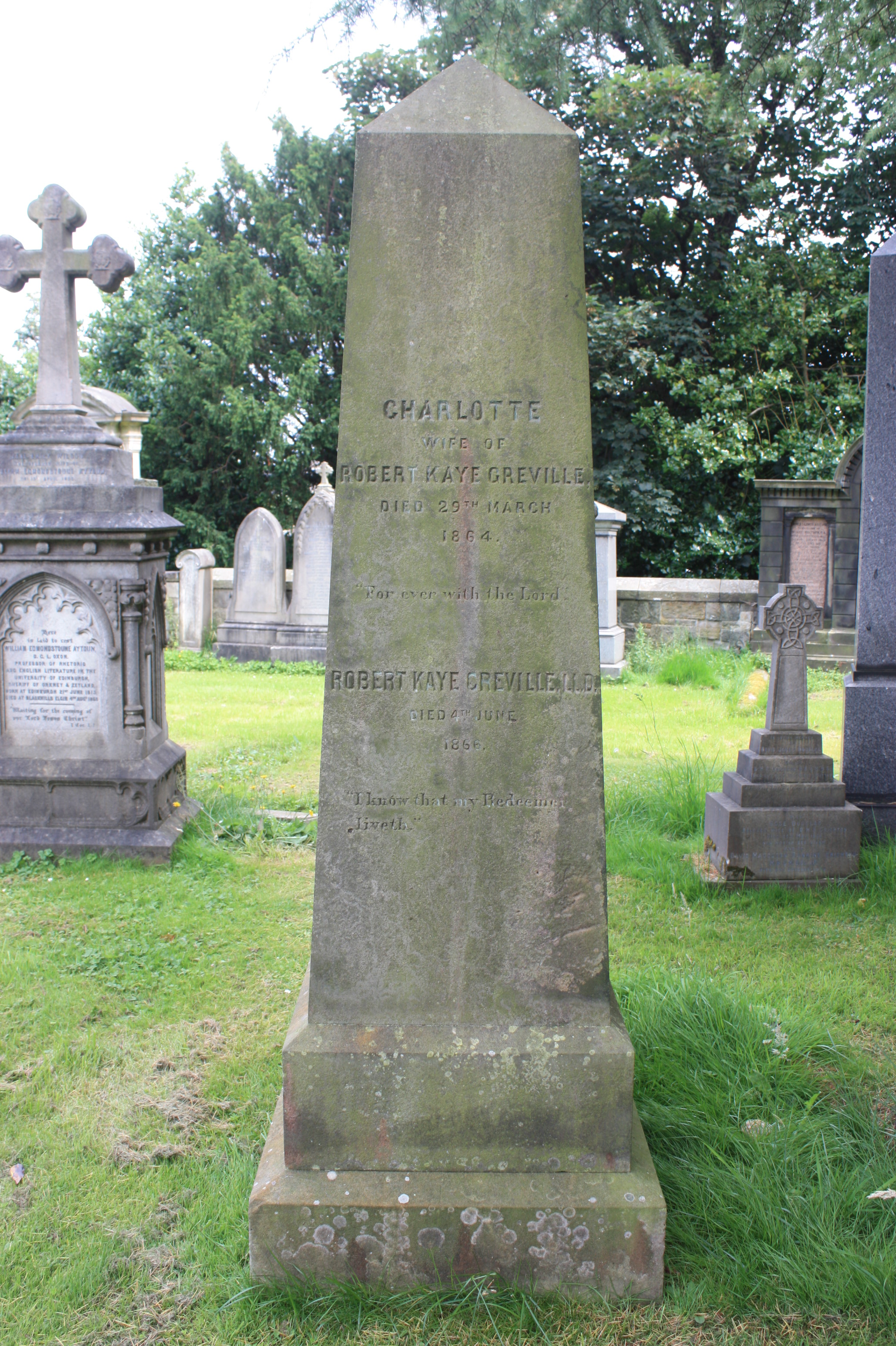
The grave of Robert Kaye Greville, Dean Cemetery, Edinburgh

Dr. Robert Kaye Greville FRSE FLS LLD (13 December 1794 – 4 June 1866) was an English mycologist, bryologist, and botanist. He was an accomplished artist and illustrator of natural history. In addition to art and science he was interested in causes like abolitionism, capital punishment, keeping Sunday special and the temperance movement. He has a mountain in Queensland named after him.

== Biography ==
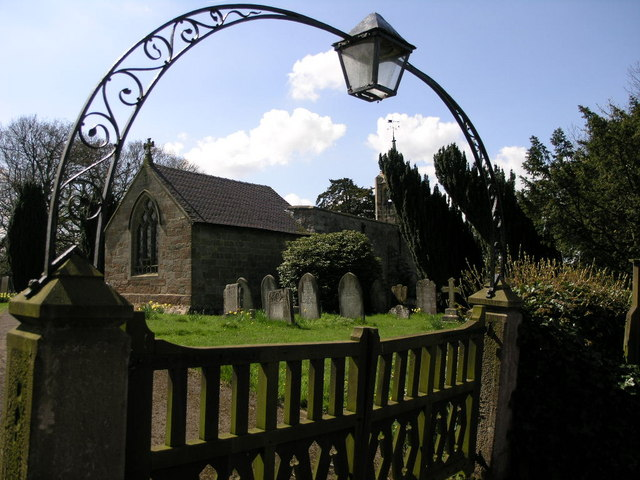
The small church of St. James in Edlaston in Derbyshire

Greville was born at Bishop Auckland, Durham, but was brought up in Derbyshire by his parents Dorothy (née Chaloner) and Robert Greville. His father who liked to compose was the rector of the parish church in Edlaston in Derbyshire. Greville had an interest in natural history since he was very young, but he originally studied medicine. Realising that he did not need an income he discarded four years of medical education in London and Edinburgh and decided to concentrate on botany which had been a strong interest when he was a boy.

Greville married William Eden, 1st Baron Auckland's niece Charlotte Eden in 1816. In 1823 he began the illustration and publishing of the journal Scottish cryptogamic flora which he dedicated to his friend Hooker. In the following year he published his guide to the flora of Edinburgh, "Flora Edinensis". Partially as a result of these publications Greville was awarded a doctorate by the University of Glasgow in 1826. He gave a large number of lectures in the natural sciences and built up collections that were bought by the University of Edinburgh. His specimens of plants and fungi are now held in the Herbarium of the Royal Botanic Garden Edinburgh. Between 1824 and 1825 he distributed the exsiccata series Algae Britannicae.

At some point in late 1826 or early in 1827, he took a boat trip to the Isle of May with two students, William Ainsworth and Charles Darwin. To their amusement, this "eminent cryptogamist" laughed so much at screeching seabirds that he had to "lie down on the greensward to enjoy his prolonged cachinnation."

In 1828 he received an honour when Mount Greville in Queensland was named in Greville's honour by a fellow botanist, Allan Cunningham. Mount Greville became part of an Australian National park in 1948 and is now part of Moogerah Peaks National Park. The aboriginal name for Mount Greville and the area around it (including Cunninghams Gap) is Moogerah which gave its name to the Park.

In the 1830s he is listed as living at 1 Wharton Place in Edinburgh.

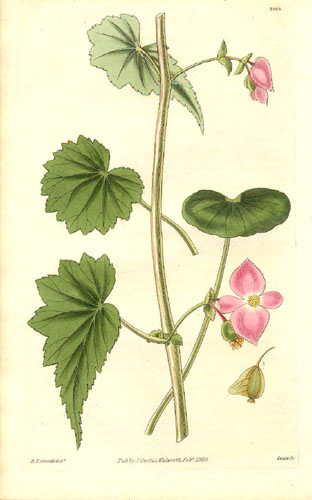
A sample illustration by Greville: Begonia_gracilis – Published in 1830

In 1835 Greville published some piano music for a sacred melody written by Rev. W. H. Bathurst. In 1839–40 he served as president of the Botanical Society of Edinburgh for the first time.

In addition to science he was interested in political causes like abolitionism, capital punishment, keeping Sunday special and the temperance movement. In 1840, Greville was one of the four vice-presidents at the World's Anti-Slavery Convention at Freemason's Hall in London on 12 June 1840. The picture above shows him in a detail from a painting made to commemorate the event which attracted delegates from America, France, Haiti, Australia, Ireland, Jamaica and Barbados. The painting now hangs in the National Portrait Gallery in London.

Greville was a member of a number of learned societies including being honorary secretary of the Biological Society and a Fellow of the Royal Society of Edinburgh. He was an honorary member of the Royal Irish Academy and the Howard Society as well as being a corresponding member of natural history societies including Brussels, Paris, Leipzig and Philadelphia. He was secretary of the Sabbath Alliance and a compiler of the Church of England's 1838 hymn book.

Towards the end of his life he created landscape paintings which were exhibited. He became a professional artist as he was short of money.

In 1865–66 Greville served as President of the Botanical Society of Edinburgh for the second and last time. He died at his home, Ormelie Villa, in Murrayfield, Edinburgh on 4 June 1866 whilst still taking an active interest in his work having new papers in preparation for publication. He is buried in Dean Cemetery on the west side of Edinburgh. The grave lies in the westmost of the two central southern sections.

== Family ==
He married Charlotte Eden on 17 October 1816 in Bishop Auckland, Durham.

Robert Kaye Greville and Charlotte Greville (née Eden) had 3 sons, Robert Northmore Greville, Eden Kaye Greville and Chaloner Greville and three daughters. Charlotte Dorothea Greville married the Rev. David Hogarth on 3 April 1857.

== Journals ==
- Flora Edinensis (1824)
- Tentamen methodi Muscorum (1822–1826)
- Icones filicum or Figures and Descriptions of Ferns (1830) (with Sir W. J. Hooker)
- Scottish cryptogamic flora (1822–1828)
- Algae britannicae (1830)
- Facts illustrative of the drunkenness of Scotland with observations on the responsibility of the clergy, magistrates, and other influential bodies (1834)
- Slavery and the slave trade in the United States of America; and the extent to which the American churches are involved in their support., 1845, Edinburgh
- The Amethyst, a Christian annual co-written with Dr Richard Huie 1831 onwards

== See also ==
- Category:Taxa named by Robert Kaye Greville
