= Shirley, Derbyshire =

Village in Derbyshire, England

Coordinates: 52.971°N 1.676°W

Shirley
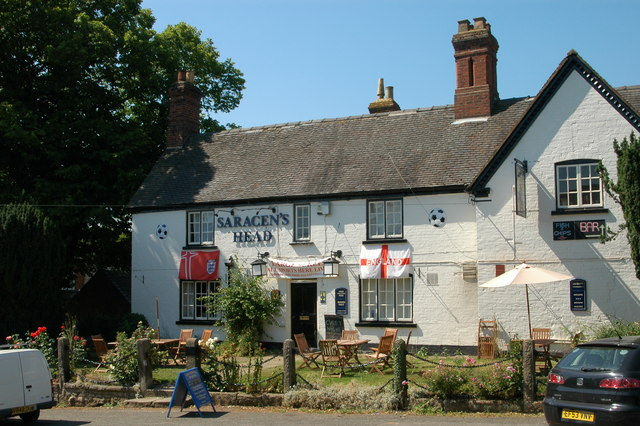
- The Saracen's Head, Shirley.

- Location within Derbyshire
- OS grid reference: SK218415
- District: Derbyshire Dales
- Shire county: Derbyshire
- Region: East Midlands
- Country: England
- Sovereign state: United Kingdom
- Post town: ASHBOURNE
- Postcode district: DE6
- Police: Derbyshire
- Fire: Derbyshire
- Ambulance: East Midlands

Shirley is a small village and civil parish in Derbyshire, 4 miles (6 km) south-east of Ashbourne. The population of the civil parish as taken at the 2011 Census was 270. It is situated in the countryside on top of a small hill.

== History ==
Shirley was mentioned in the Domesday Book as belonging to Henry de Ferrers (Note: Henry was given a large number of manors in Derbyshire including Doveridge, Linton, Brailsford and Cowley.) and being worth forty shillings.

In the nineteenth century St Michael's Church, Shirley was led by the Rev. Charles Francis Powys who had a number of literary children.

Rev. Charles Francis Powys was the great nephew of Thomas Powys, created the first Lord Lilford in 1797, and the Powys' were also cousins of the Shirley family who held the living of the parish of Shirley in Derbyshire and were direct descendants of Earl Ferrers, the first Sheriff of the County.

== Notable residents ==
- John Cowper Powys, born in the town, "Derbyshire's most prolific author", according to Tom Bates
- Theodore Francis Powys, born in the town, author
- Gertrude Mary Powys, born in the town, painter
- Littleton Charles Powys, author and headmaster of Sherborne School
- Prof. Rev. Walter Waddington Shirley, historian at Oxford University
- Rev. William Richardson Linton, clergyman and botanist who wrote a Flora of Derbyshire and discovered Rubus durescens, a bramble endemic to Derbyshire

== See also ==
- Listed buildings in Shirley, Derbyshire
