= Yeaveley =

Village in Derbyshire, England

Coordinates: 52.960°N 1.724°W

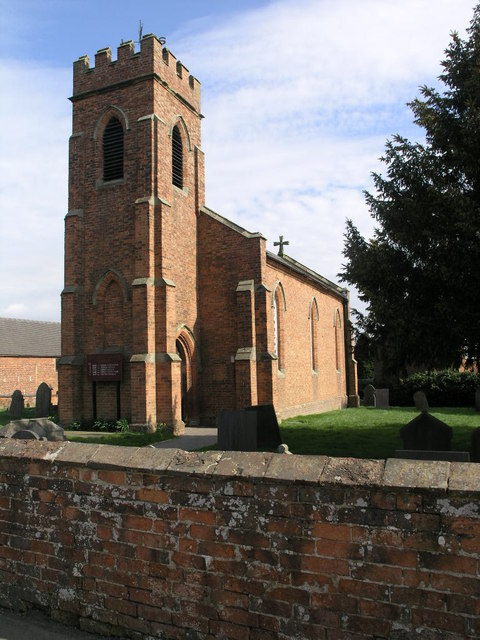
- The red brick Holy Trinity church

- Location within Derbyshire
- OS grid reference: SK186403
- District: Derbyshire Dales
- Shire county: Derbyshire
- Region: East Midlands
- Country: England
- Sovereign state: United Kingdom
- Post town: ASHBOURNE
- Postcode district: DE6
- Dialling code: 01335
- Police: Derbyshire
- Fire: Derbyshire
- Ambulance: East Midlands
- UK Parliament: Derbyshire Dales

Yeaveley is a small village and civil parish near Rodsley and 4 miles south of Ashbourne in Derbyshire. The population of the civil parish (including Rodsley) as at the 2011 census was 396.

The village has no school but does have a public house and the Holy Trinity Church. During the reign of Richard I, Ralph Foun gave a hermitage at Yeaveley with lands, waters, woods, mills, and other appurtenances to the Knights Hospitallers.

== Notable residents ==
Henry Yevele, medieval architect of Westminster Abbey nave, was born here c. 1320.

John Jackson Oakden, pioneer pastoralist and explorer of South Australia, was born here 1818.

Roy Wood, musician (Wizzard), lives in nearby Cubley.

== See also ==
- Listed buildings in Yeaveley
