= Grade I listed buildings in Derbyshire =

Derbyshire shown in England

There are over 9000 Grade I listed buildings in England. This page is a list of these buildings in the county of Derbyshire, sub-divided by district.

== Amber Valley ==
Name	Location	Type	Completed (Note: The date given is the date used by Historic England as significant for the initial building or that of an important part in the structure's description.)	Date designated	Grid ref. (Note: The grid reference is based on the British national grid reference system, sometimes known as OSGB36, used by the Ordnance Survey.) Geo-coordinates	Notes	Entry number (Note: The "List Entry Number" is a unique number assigned to each listed building and scheduled monument by Historic England.)	Image
North Mill	Belper	Mill	Earlier than 1803	3 February 1966	SK3454248081; 53°01′44″N 1°29′11″W	Built by William Strutt; one of the oldest surviving examples of an industrialised iron-framed 'fire-proof' building in the world. Part of the Derwent Valley Mills World Heritage Site.	1186846	North Mill More images
Church of St Mary	Crich	Anglican church	12th-century core	13 February 1967	SK3480154660; 53°05′17″N 1°28′55″W		1068597	Church of St Mary More images
Church of St Mary	Denby	Parish church	Early 13th century	13 February 1967	SK3986346495; 53°00′51″N 1°24′26″W		1109129	Church of St Mary More images
Church of St Alkmund	Duffield	Parish church	Early 14th century	13 February 1967	SK3495142770; 52°58′52″N 1°28′51″W		1109116	Church of St Alkmund More images
Church of St Clement	Horsley	Parish church	Early 14th century	13 February 1967	SK3753844498; 52°59′47″N 1°26′32″W		1109138	Church of St Clement More images
Church of All Saints	Kedleston Park, Kedleston	Church	1727	13 February 1967	SK3121940307; 52°57′33″N 1°32′12″W		1335331	Church of All Saints More images
Kedleston Hall	Kedleston Park, Kedleston	Country house	1758–65	25 September 1951	SK3127140296; 52°57′33″N 1°32′09″W		1311507	Kedleston Hall More images
The Boathouse	Kedleston Park, Kedleston	Boathouse	c.1770	13 February 1967	SK3110340795; 52°57′49″N 1°32′18″W		1109090	The Boathouse More images
The North Lodge	Kedleston	Gate	18th century	13 February 1967	SK3216241222; 52°58′03″N 1°31′21″W		1109091	The North Lodge More images
Church of St Michael	Kirk Langley	Parish church	Early 14th century	13 February 1967	SK2864538854; 52°56′47″N 1°34′31″W		1109095	Church of St Michael More images
Church of All Saints	Mackworth	Parish church	Early 14th century	13 February 1967	SK3202337751; 52°56′10″N 1°31′30″W		1158642	Church of All Saints More images
Gatehouse to Mackworth Castle	Mackworth	Fortified manor house	c.1495–1500	13 February 1967	SK3133237828; 52°56′13″N 1°32′07″W		1158635	Gatehouse to Mackworth Castle More images
Church of St Matthew	Pentrich	Parish church	12th century	13 February 1967	SK3894852575; 53°04′08″N 1°25′13″W		1109151	Church of St Matthew More images
The Ruins of South Wingfield Manor House, incorporating Manor Farmhouse and an aisled outbuilding to the south	South Wingfield	Manor house	1439–53	25 September 1951	SK3744054742; 53°05′19″N 1°26′33″W		1109156	The Ruins of South Wingfield Manor House, incorporating Manor Farmhouse and an aisled outbuilding to the south More images
Church of All Saints	Mugginton, Weston Underwood	Parish church	11th century	13 February 1967	SK2832942872; 52°58′57″N 1°34′46″W		1109067	Church of All Saints More images
The Bridge and Cascade	Kedleston Park, Weston Underwood	Bridge	1770–71	13 February 1967	SK3126840716; 52°57′46″N 1°32′09″W		1335352	The Bridge and Cascade More images

== Bolsover ==
Name	Location	Type	Completed	Date designated	Grid ref. Geo-coordinates	Entry number	Image
Church of St John the Baptist	Ault Hucknall	Parish church	11th century	8 July 1966	SK4674165234; 53°10′56″N 1°18′07″W	1109001	Church of St John the Baptist More images
Hardwick Hall	Hardwick Park, Ault Hucknall	Country house	1590–97	11 July 1951	SK4630563733; 53°10′07″N 1°18′32″W	1051617	Hardwick Hall More images
Hardwick Old Hall	Hardwick Park, Ault Hucknall	Country house	Early 16th century	11 July 1951	SK4614863697; 53°10′06″N 1°18′40″W	1052337	Hardwick Old Hall More images
Barlborough Hall	Barlborough	Country house	1583	19 November 1951	SK4777078257; 53°17′57″N 1°17′05″W	1108972	Barlborough Hall More images
Bolsover Castle	Old Bolsover	Castle	17th century	23 March 1989	SK4702970718; 53°13′53″N 1°17′49″W	1108976	Bolsover Castle More images
Church of All Saints	Steetley, Whitwell	Church	12th century	26 August 1965	SK5435778727; 53°18′10″N 1°11′09″W	1366579	Church of All Saints More images
Church of St Lawrence	Whitwell	Parish church	12th century	26 August 1965	SK5262476830; 53°17′09″N 1°12′44″W	1108938	Church of St Lawrence More images

== Chesterfield ==
Name	Location	Type	Completed	Date designated	Grid ref. Geo-coordinates	Entry number	Image
Church of St Mary and All Saints	Chesterfield	Parish church	Medieval	15 July 1971	SK3851371171; 53°14′10″N 1°25′28″W	1334708	Church of St Mary and All Saints More images

== City of Derby ==
Name	Location	Type	Completed	Date designated	Grid ref. Geo-coordinates	Entry number	Image
Bakewell's Gates at the Silk Mill Industrial Museum	City of Derby	Gate	1728	20 June 1952	SK3508936242; 52°55′21″N 1°28′46″W	1229981	Bakewell's Gates at the Silk Mill Industrial Museum More images
Cathedral Church of All Saints	City of Derby	Church	Early 16th century	20 June 1952	SK3523436506; 52°55′29″N 1°28′38″W	1228277	Cathedral Church of All Saints More images
Church of St Mary	Chaddesden	Church	1357	20 June 1952	SK3817836895; 52°55′41″N 1°26′01″W	1215913	Church of St Mary More images
County Hall	City of Derby	County hall	1660	20 June 1952	SK3501236482; 52°55′29″N 1°28′50″W	1279174	County Hall More images
Darley Abbey Mills (South Complex) Long Mill, Middle Mill, East Mill, West Mill, engine house and chimney, tollhouse, bobbin shop and drying shed	Darley Abbey	Mill	Pre-1850	13 February 1967	SK3517738550; 52°56′35″N 1°28′41″W	1279399	Darley Abbey Mills (South Complex) Long Mill, Middle Mill, East Mill, West Mill, engine house and chimney, tollhouse, bobbin shop and drying shed More images
St Helen's House including attached former school buildings and front wall	City of Derby	Townhouse	c.1767	20 June 1952	SK3503336787; 52°55′38″N 1°28′49″W	1228285	St Helen's House including attached former school buildings and front wall More images
St Mary's Bridge Chapel	City of Derby	Chapel	14th century	20 June 1952	SK3533836759; 52°55′37″N 1°28′33″W	1215878	St Mary's Bridge Chapel More images
The Homestead with gatepiers	Spondon	House	1740	10 November 1967	SK4003435920; 52°55′09″N 1°24′22″W	1229478	The Homestead with gatepiers More images
41 Friar Gate	City of Derby	House	c.1770	20 June 1952	SK3466436450; 52°55′28″N 1°29′09″W	1287620	41 Friar Gate More images

== Derbyshire Dales ==
Name	Location	Type	Completed	Date designated	Grid ref. Geo-coordinates	Entry number	Image
Old Grammar School	Ashbourne	Former school	1586	15 June 1951	SK1769846526; 53°00′57″N 1°44′16″W	1207596	Old Grammar School More images
Parish Church of St Oswald	Ashbourne	Parish church	Mainly c.1200	15 June 1951	SK1762846439; 53°00′54″N 1°44′19″W	1207715	Parish Church of St Oswald More images
The Mansion including coach house wall	Ashbourne	House	c.1685	15 June 1951	SK1772946509; 53°00′56″N 1°44′14″W	1335139	The Mansion including coach house wall More images
Bakewell Bridge	Bakewell	Bridge	c.1300	13 March 1951	SK2194968652; 53°12′52″N 1°40′22″W	1148112	Bakewell Bridge More images
Church of All Saints	Bakewell	Parish church	18th century	13 March 1951	SK2155668483; 53°12′47″N 1°40′43″W	1316489	Church of All Saints More images
Cross situated 12 metres to south of porch of Church of All Saints	Bakewell	Cross	Early 10th century	7 January 1970	SK2154568457; 53°12′46″N 1°40′44″W	1316491	Cross situated 12 metres to south of porch of Church of All Saints More images
Holme Bridge	Bakewell	Packhorse bridge	1664	13 March 1951	SK2154668988; 53°13′03″N 1°40′44″W	1247518	Holme Bridge More images
Holme Hall	Bakewell	Country house	1626–28	13 March 1951	SK2154769106; 53°13′07″N 1°40′44″W	1246166	Holme Hall More images
The Great Cross and railed enclosure	Bakewell	Cross	Early 9th century	13 January 1951	SK2157068465; 53°12′46″N 1°40′42″W	1316492	The Great Cross and railed enclosure More images
Baslow Bridge	Baslow and Bubnell	Bridge	Early 17th century	12 July 1967	SK2510472369; 53°14′52″N 1°37′31″W	1088195	Baslow Bridge More images
Church of All Saints	Bradbourne	Church	12th century	13 September 1967	SK2080752756; 53°04′18″N 1°41′27″W	1109479	Church of All Saints More images
Church of All Saints	Brailsford	Parish church	12th century	13 September 1967	SK2449241274; 52°58′06″N 1°38′12″W	1109734	Church of All Saints More images
Ednaston Manor and attached walls and terracing	Brailsford	Country house	1912–19 by Lutyens	13 September 1967	SK2384642276; 52°58′38″N 1°38′47″W	1109745	Upload Photo
Chatsworth House	Chatsworth	Country house	1687–89	29 September 1951	SK2602270104; 53°13′38″N 1°36′42″W	1373871	Chatsworth House More images
Bridge on main approach to Chatsworth House	Chatsworth	Bridge	1759–74	12 July 1967	SK2571870176; 53°13′41″N 1°36′58″W	1049093	Bridge on main approach to Chatsworth House More images
Conduit House, Cascade and adjoining statues	Chatsworth	Cascade and bridge	c.1696	12 July 1967	SK2630470050; 53°13′37″N 1°36′27″W	1088181	Conduit House, Cascade and adjoining statues More images
Egyptian statue (now indoors)	Chatsworth	Statue	Egyptian c.1570–1304 BC	19 June 1987	SK2613070181; 53°13′41″N 1°36′36″W	1067714	Egyptian statue (now indoors)
Egyptian statue (now indoors)	Chatsworth	Statue	Egyptian c.1570–1304 BC	19 June 1987	SK2614070182; 53°13′41″N 1°36′36″W	1334742	Upload Photo
Former stables at Chatsworth House	Chatsworth	Former stables	1758–63 by James Paine	12 July 1967	SK2619670269; 53°13′44″N 1°36′33″W	1088184	Former stables at Chatsworth House More images
Series of herms and altars laid out in a Y to the east of the Ring Pond	Chatsworth	Herms	c.1730	19 June 1987	SK2616969906; 53°13′32″N 1°36′34″W	1334743	Series of herms and altars laid out in a Y to the east of the Ring Pond
Temple of Flora	Chatsworth	Temple	1693–95	12 July 1967	SK2607270232; 53°13′43″N 1°36′39″W	1088176	Temple of Flora More images
Cromford Mills	Cromford	Mill	1771	22 June 1950	SK2985156982; 53°06′33″N 1°33′20″W	1248010	Cromford Mills More images
Church of St Mary	Cromford	Parish church	1792–97	22 June 1950	SK2996657116; 53°06′37″N 1°33′14″W	1248052	Church of St Mary More images
Church of St Andrew	Cubley	Parish church	Late 15th century	13 September 1967	SK1649337692; 52°56′11″N 1°45′22″W	1203949	Church of St Andrew More images
Church of St Cuthbert	Doveridge	Parish church	Late 12th century	13 September 1967	SK1138534102; 52°54′15″N 1°49′56″W	1274523	Church of St Cuthbert More images
Church of St Peter	Edensor	Parish church	12th century	12 July 1967	SK2506769901; 53°13′32″N 1°37′34″W	1088158	Church of St Peter More images
Churchyard cross 6 metres east of church porch	Eyam	Cross	Early 9th century	29 September 1951	SK2178576398; 53°17′03″N 1°40′29″W	1100263	Churchyard cross 6 metres east of church porch More images
Church of St Giles	Great Longstone	Parish church	13th century	12 July 1967	SK2002171910; 53°14′38″N 1°42′05″W	1109899	Church of St Giles More images
Padley Chapel	Upper Padley, Grindleford	Chapel	14th and 15th century	29 September 1951	SK2467878954; 53°18′25″N 1°37′52″W	1335033	Padley Chapel More images
Church of All Saints	Hassop	Roman Catholic church	1816–17	12 July 1967	SK2234472322; 53°14′51″N 1°40′00″W	1253035	Church of All Saints More images
Church of St Michael and All Angels	Bank Top, Hathersage	Church	14th century	12 July 1967	SK2339881854; 53°19′59″N 1°39′00″W	1109793	Church of St Michael and All Angels More images
Holy Trinity Church	Kirk Ireton	Parish church	12th century	13 September 1967	SK2689850211; 53°02′55″N 1°36′01″W	1335168	Holy Trinity Church More images
Church of St Michael	Kniveton	Church	12th century	13 September 1967	SK2099850395; 53°03′01″N 1°41′18″W	1146435	Church of St Michael More images
Church of St Chad	Longford	Church	15th century	13 September 1967	SK2148038322; 52°56′31″N 1°40′55″W	1109790	Church of St Chad More images
Haddon Hall	Nether Haddon	Fortified manor house	Mainly 14th and 15th century	29 September 1951	SK2350566337; 53°11′37″N 1°38′59″W	1334982	Haddon Hall More images
Church of St Mary and St Barlok	Norbury Hollow, Norbury and Roston	Church	Early 15th century	13 September 1967	SK1254942395; 52°58′44″N 1°48′52″W	1109764	Church of St Mary and St Barlok More images
The Old Manor and attached garden wall	Norbury Hollow	Country house	Late 17th century	5 February 1952	SK1252542357; 52°58′42″N 1°48′54″W	1281200	The Old Manor and attached garden wall More images
Somersal Herbert Hall	Somersal Herbert	Country house	Early 16th century	5 February 1982	SK1356935231; 52°54′52″N 1°47′59″W	1274325	Somersal Herbert Hall More images
Snitterton Hall	Snitterton, South Darley	Country house	Late 16th century	22 June 1950	SK2784760341; 53°08′22″N 1°35′07″W	1248141	Snitterton Hall More images
Sudbury Hall and attached stable block	Sudbury	Country house	1660–70	5 February 1952	SK1586832111; 52°53′10″N 1°45′56″W	1273995	Sudbury Hall and attached stable block More images
Church of St Michael	Taddington	Church	14th century	12 July 1967	SK1412871159; 53°14′14″N 1°47′23″W	1109887	Church of St Michael More images
Church of St Leonard	Thorpe	Church	Early 12th century	13 September 1984	SK1562850160; 53°02′55″N 1°46′06″W	1203690	Church of St Leonard More images
Church of St John the Baptist	Tideswell	Church	14th century	12 July 1967	SK1525675774; 53°16′43″N 1°46′22″W	1215255	Church of St John the Baptist More images
Church of St Mary	Wirksworth	Church	Early English to Perpendicular	24 October 1950	SK2874853942; 53°04′55″N 1°34′20″W	1335090	Church of St Mary More images
Remains of Chapel of St Mary and St John the Baptist to south of Stydd Hall	Yeaveley	Chapel	Early 13th century	13 September 1967	SK1719839963; 52°57′24″N 1°44′44″W	1109732	Remains of Chapel of St Mary and St John the Baptist to south of Stydd Hall More images
Church of All Saints	Youlgreave	Parish church	Late 12th century	12 July 1967	SK2120564372; 53°10′34″N 1°41′03″W	1109853	Church of All Saints More images

== Erewash ==
Name	Location	Type	Completed	Date designated	Grid ref. Geo-coordinates	Entry number	Image
Church of All Saints	Breadsall	Parish church	12th century	10 November 1967	SK3710839799; 52°57′15″N 1°26′57″W	1328833	Church of All Saints More images
Church of St Michael	Breaston	Parish church	11th century	10 November 1967	SK4600733506; 52°53′49″N 1°19′03″W	1087960	Church of St Michael More images
Dale Abbey ruins	Dale Abbey	Ruined abbey	c.1200–1538	10 November 1967	SK4374938740; 52°56′39″N 1°21′01″W	1140435	Dale Abbey ruins More images
Cat and Fiddle Mill	Dale Abbey	Corn mill	1788	2 September 1952	SK4379339778; 52°57′13″N 1°20′59″W	1205307	Cat and Fiddle Mill More images
Church of All Saints and Vergers Farmhouse	Dale Abbey	Parish church	Late 12th century	10 November 1967	SK4373638586; 52°56′34″N 1°21′02″W	1140436	Church of All Saints and Vergers Farmhouse More images
Church of St Chad	Draycott and Church Wilne	Parish church	Early 13th century	10 November 1967	SK4489131838; 52°52′56″N 1°20′04″W	1281336	Church of St Chad More images
Church of All Saints	Kirk Hallam	Parish church	14th century	26 September 1963	SK4585740550; 52°57′37″N 1°19′08″W	1205580	Church of All Saints More images
Church of St Matthew	Morley	Parish church	12th century	10 November 1967	SK3966240935; 52°57′52″N 1°24′39″W	1205838	Church of St Matthew More images
Church of St Giles	Sandiacre	Parish church	11th century	10 November 1967	SK4800437265; 52°55′50″N 1°17′14″W	1204475	Church of St Giles More images
Church of All Saints	Sawley	Church	11th century	22 October 1962	SK4724631365; 52°52′40″N 1°17′58″W	1204277	Church of All Saints More images

== High Peak ==
Name	Location	Type	Completed	Date designated	Grid ref. Geo-coordinates	Entry number	Image
The Crescent	Buxton	Townhouse	1780–88	25 January 1951	SK0580673572; 53°15′33″N 1°54′52″W	1257876	The Crescent More images
Peveril Castle curtain walls and fragmentary foundations	Castleton	Castle	Late 11th century	17 April 1985	SK1493382606; 53°20′25″N 1°46′38″W	1250966	Peveril Castle curtain walls and fragmentary foundations More images
Church of St Peter	Hope	Parish church	Early 14th century	21 April 1967	SK1722983470; 53°20′52″N 1°44′34″W	1121945	Church of St Peter More images

== North East Derbyshire ==
Name	Location	Type	Completed	Date designated	Grid ref. Geo-coordinates	Entry number	Image
Church of All Saints	Ashover	Parish church	Late 13th century	31 January 1967	SK3486863124; 53°09′51″N 1°28′48″W	1291953	Church of All Saints More images
Parish Church of St Peter and St Paul	Brampton	Parish church	c.1300	31 January 1967	SK3361571924; 53°14′36″N 1°29′52″W	1117041	Parish Church of St Peter and St Paul More images
Church of St John the Baptist	Dronfield	Parish church	Late 13th century	9 January 1967	SK3528778417; 53°18′06″N 1°28′19″W	1187146	Church of St John the Baptist More images
Church of St Peter and St Paul	Eckington	Parish church	12th century	31 January 1967	SK4320379784; 53°18′48″N 1°21′11″W	1045851	Church of St Peter and St Paul More images
Church of St Lawrence	North Wingfield	Church	12th century	31 January 1967	SK4046164462; 53°10′33″N 1°23′46″W	1335463	Church of St Lawrence More images
Renishaw Hall	Renishaw	Country house	17th century	25 October 1951	SK4380278607; 53°18′09″N 1°20′39″W	1054857	Renishaw Hall More images
Sutton Scarsdale Hall	Sutton Scarsdale cum Duckmanton	Country house	17th century	25 October 1951	SK4420468908; 53°12′55″N 1°20′22″W	1108914	Sutton Scarsdale Hall More images
Church of All Saints	Wingerworth	Parish church	12th century	31 January 1967	SK3832267454; 53°12′10″N 1°25′40″W	1291897	Church of All Saints More images

== South Derbyshire ==
Name	Location	Type	Completed	Date designated	Grid ref. Geo-coordinates	Entry number	Image
Church of All Saints	Aston-on-Trent	Parish church	12th century	10 November 1967	SK4148929348; 52°51′36″N 1°23′07″W	1281625	Church of All Saints More images
Church of St Wilfrid	Barrow-upon-Trent	Parish church	Mid-13th century	10 November 1967	SK3529328385; 52°51′07″N 1°28′38″W	1096559	Church of St Wilfrid More images
Calke Abbey	Calke Park, Calke	Country house	18th century	2 September 1952	SK3677322593; 52°47′59″N 1°27′22″W	1031839	Calke Abbey More images
Church of St Michael and All Angels	Church Broughton	Parish church	12th century	19 January 1967	SK2053333767; 52°54′03″N 1°41′46″W	1205179	Church of St Michael and All Angels More images
Church of St Wilfrid	Egginton	Church	1690	19 January 1967	SK2675527849; 52°50′51″N 1°36′15″W	1334567	Church of St Wilfrid More images
Church of St Bartholomew	Elvaston	Parish church	13th century	10 November 1967	SK4070432975; 52°53′34″N 1°23′47″W	1096395	Church of St Bartholomew More images
Church of St Helen	Etwall	Parish church	Late 12th century	19 January 1967	SK2688831991; 52°53′05″N 1°36′07″W	1096573	Church of St Helen More images
Church of St Saviour	Foremark	Parish church	1662	19 January 1967	SK3297526472; 52°50′05″N 1°30′43″W	1045861	Church of St Saviour More images
Foremarke Hall	Foremark	Country house	Early 18th century	2 September 1952	SK3328526512; 52°50′06″N 1°30′27″W	1096531	Foremarke Hall More images
Church of St Mary	Marston on Dove	Parish church	13th century	19 January 1967	SK2331429633; 52°51′49″N 1°39′19″W	1334544	Church of St Mary More images
Aisled barn attached to north of stables at Melbourne Hall	Melbourne	Barn	Early 18th century	18 February 1971	SK3893625052; 52°49′18″N 1°25′25″W	1281386	Upload Photo
Church of St Michael and St Mary	Melbourne	Parish church	c.1133–early 13th century	10 November 1967	SK3890024994; 52°49′16″N 1°25′27″W	1204556	Church of St Michael and St Mary More images
Covered seat to east of Fountain Pond in Melbourne Hall gardens	Melbourne	Garden seat	c.1704	10 November 1967	SK3923624854; 52°49′11″N 1°25′09″W	1096377	Upload Photo
Covered seat to west of Fountain Pond in Melbourne Hall gardens	Melbourne	Garden seat	c.1704	10 November 1967	SK3912624888; 52°49′12″N 1°25′15″W	1262770	Upload Photo
Five flights of steps between terraces at Melbourne Hall gardens	Melbourne	Steps	c.1704	10 November 1967	SK3908024992; 52°49′16″N 1°25′17″W	1096411	Upload Photo
Garden walls attached to south front of Melbourne Hall with attached railings and wall to east	Melbourne	Garden wall	Late 17th century	10 November 1967	SK3895624974; 52°49′15″N 1°25′24″W	1334648	Garden walls attached to south front of Melbourne Hall with attached railings and wall to east
Muniment Room in Melbourne Hall gardens	Melbourne	Pavilion	Early 17th century	10 November 1967	SK3901625044; 52°49′17″N 1°25′21″W	1281353	Upload Photo
Pair of cherubs to north of statue of Mercury in Melbourne Hall gardens	Melbourne	Statue	c.1700	10 November 1967	SK3911525034; 52°49′17″N 1°25′16″W	1334595	Pair of cherubs to north of statue of Mercury in Melbourne Hall gardens
Pair of cherubs to south of statue of Mercury in Melbourne Hall gardens	Melbourne	Statue	c.1700	10 November 1967	SK3911424946; 52°49′14″N 1°25′16″W	1096412	Upload Photo
Pair of pedestals supporting fruit bowl vase in Melbourne Hall gardens	Melbourne	Vase	Late 17th century	10 November 1967	SK3899825013; 52°49′16″N 1°25′22″W	1096409	Upload Photo
Pair of pedestals with lead slaves in Melbourne Hall gardens	Melbourne	Statue	c.1700	10 November 1967	SK3904325010; 52°49′16″N 1°25′19″W	1334634	Upload Photo
Pedestal and Four Seasons Vase in Melbourne Hall gardens	Melbourne	Vase	1705	10 November 1967	SK3915124785; 52°49′09″N 1°25′14″W	1281182	Pedestal and Four Seasons Vase in Melbourne Hall gardens
Pedestal with statue of Andromeda in Melbourne Hall gardens	Melbourne	Statue	c.1700	10 November 1967	SK3918725027; 52°49′17″N 1°25′12″W	1334616	Pedestal with statue of Andromeda in Melbourne Hall gardens More images
Pedestal with statue of Mercury in Melbourne Hall gardens	Melbourne	Statue	c.1700	10 November 1967	SK3911624990; 52°49′16″N 1°25′16″W	1204240	Upload Photo
Pedestal with statue of Perseus in Melbourne Hall gardens	Melbourne	Statue	c.1700	10 November 1967	SK3918524950; 52°49′14″N 1°25′12″W	1096374	Upload Photo
Pedestal with vase to south-west of Fountain Pond in Melbourne Hall garden	Melbourne	Vase	Early 18th century	10 November 1967	SK3918824853; 52°49′11″N 1°25′12″W	1096378	Upload Photo
Stone fountain to north of lower terrace in Melbourne Hall gardens	Melbourne	Fountain	c.1704	10 November 1967	SK3911625042; 52°49′17″N 1°25′16″W	1204272	Stone fountain to north of lower terrace in Melbourne Hall gardens
Stone fountain to south of lower terrace in Melbourne Hall gardens	Melbourne	Fountain	c.1704	10 November 1967	SK3911424937; 52°49′14″N 1°25′16″W	1204317	Upload Photo
Tea rooms to north of Melbourne Hall and attached walls	Melbourne	Country house	Early 18th century	10 November 1967	SK3899625066; 52°49′18″N 1°25′22″W	1334633	Tea rooms to north of Melbourne Hall and attached walls More images
The Birdcage Arbour in Melbourne Hall gardens	Melbourne	Summerhouse	c.1705–10	10 November 1967	SK3921924988; 52°49′16″N 1°25′10″W	1096375	The Birdcage Arbour in Melbourne Hall gardens More images
Three pairs of vases flanking central path of upper terrace in Melbourne Hall gardens	Melbourne	Vase	Early 18th century	11 March 1987	SK3903224995; 52°49′16″N 1°25′20″W	1204146	Upload Photo
Two pairs of cherubs to north-west of the Grand Basin in Melbourne Hall gardens	Melbourne	Statue	c.1700	10 November 1967	SK3914125032; 52°49′17″N 1°25′14″W	1096372	Two pairs of cherubs to north-west of the Grand Basin in Melbourne Hall gardens
Two pairs of cherubs to south-west of the Grand Basin in Melbourne Hall gardens	Melbourne	Statue	c.1700	10 November 1967	SK3914424944; 52°49′14″N 1°25′14″W	1334615	Upload Photo
Vase and pedestal to north-west of the Four Seasons Vase in Melbourne Hall gardens	Melbourne	Vase	Late 18th century	10 November 1967	SK3913624812; 52°49′10″N 1°25′15″W	1096380	Upload Photo
Church of St Andrew	Radbourne	Parish church	13th century	19 January 1967	SK2860135993; 52°55′14″N 1°34′34″W	1204062	Church of St Andrew More images
Radbourne Hall	Radbourne	House	c.1865	2 September 1952	SK2866435654; 52°55′03″N 1°34′31″W	1334517	Radbourne Hall More images
Church of St Wystan	Repton	Parish church	9th century	19 January 1967	SK3030127154; 52°50′28″N 1°33′06″W	1334560	Church of St Wystan More images
Market Cross	Repton	Market cross	Medieval	2 September 1952	SK3037227016; 52°50′23″N 1°33′02″W	1096537	Market Cross More images
Priory Gateway, precinct walls, the tithe barn and the Lodge, Repton School	Repton	Gate	13th century	19 January 1967	SK3034827110; 52°50′26″N 1°33′03″W	1055800	Priory Gateway, precinct walls, the tithe barn and the Lodge, Repton School More images
Remains of Priory Church and the Chapter Block, Repton School	Repton	Church remains	13th century	19 January 1967	SK3037827186; 52°50′29″N 1°33′02″W	1096512	Upload Photo
Repton Hall with Prior Overton's Tower, Repton School	Repton	House	c.1680	2 September 1952	SK3031527254; 52°50′31″N 1°33′05″W	1057669	Upload Photo
The Old Priory, attached walls and gate piers, Repton School	Repton	Former priory	Late 12th century	2 September 1952	SK3033827191; 52°50′29″N 1°33′04″W	1055755	The Old Priory, attached walls and gate piers, Repton School More images
Church of St James	Smisby	Parish church	13th century	19 January 1967	SK3479619130; 52°46′07″N 1°29′09″W	1096467	Church of St James More images
Church of St Michael	Stanton by Bridge	Parish church	11th century	10 November 1967	SK3673527150; 52°50′26″N 1°27′22″W	1088339	Church of St Michael More images
Swarkestone Bridge and Causeway	Stanton by Bridge	Bridge	Late 13th or early 14th century	10 November 1967	SK3703027810; 52°50′48″N 1°27′06″W	1088337	Swarkestone Bridge and Causeway More images
The Grandstand, Cuttle and Gate 200 metres north of Swarkestone Hall	Swarkestone	Pavilion	c.1630	10 November 1967	SK3748428614; 52°51′13″N 1°26′41″W	1088345	The Grandstand, Cuttle and Gate 200 metres north of Swarkestone Hall More images
Church of St Andrew	Twyford and Stenson	Parish church	12th century	19 January 1967	SK3274128551; 52°51′12″N 1°30′55″W	1039117	Church of St Andrew More images
Church of St Mary	Weston-on-Trent	Parish church	13th century	10 November 1967	SK3976527597; 52°50′40″N 1°24′40″W	1205737	Church of St Mary More images

== See also ==
- Listed buildings in Derbyshire
- Category:Grade I listed buildings in Derbyshire
- Grade II* listed buildings in Amber Valley
- Grade II* listed buildings in Bolsover (district)
- Grade II* listed buildings in Chesterfield
- Grade II* listed buildings in Derby
- Grade II* listed buildings in Derbyshire Dales
- Grade II* listed buildings in Erewash
- Grade II* listed buildings in High Peak
- Grade II* listed buildings in North East Derbyshire
- Grade II* listed buildings in South Derbyshire
