= Weston Underwood =

Weston Underwood may refer to:

- Weston Underwood, Buckinghamshire, England
- Weston Underwood, Derbyshire, England
