= All Saints' Church, Mugginton =

All Saints’ Church, Mugginton
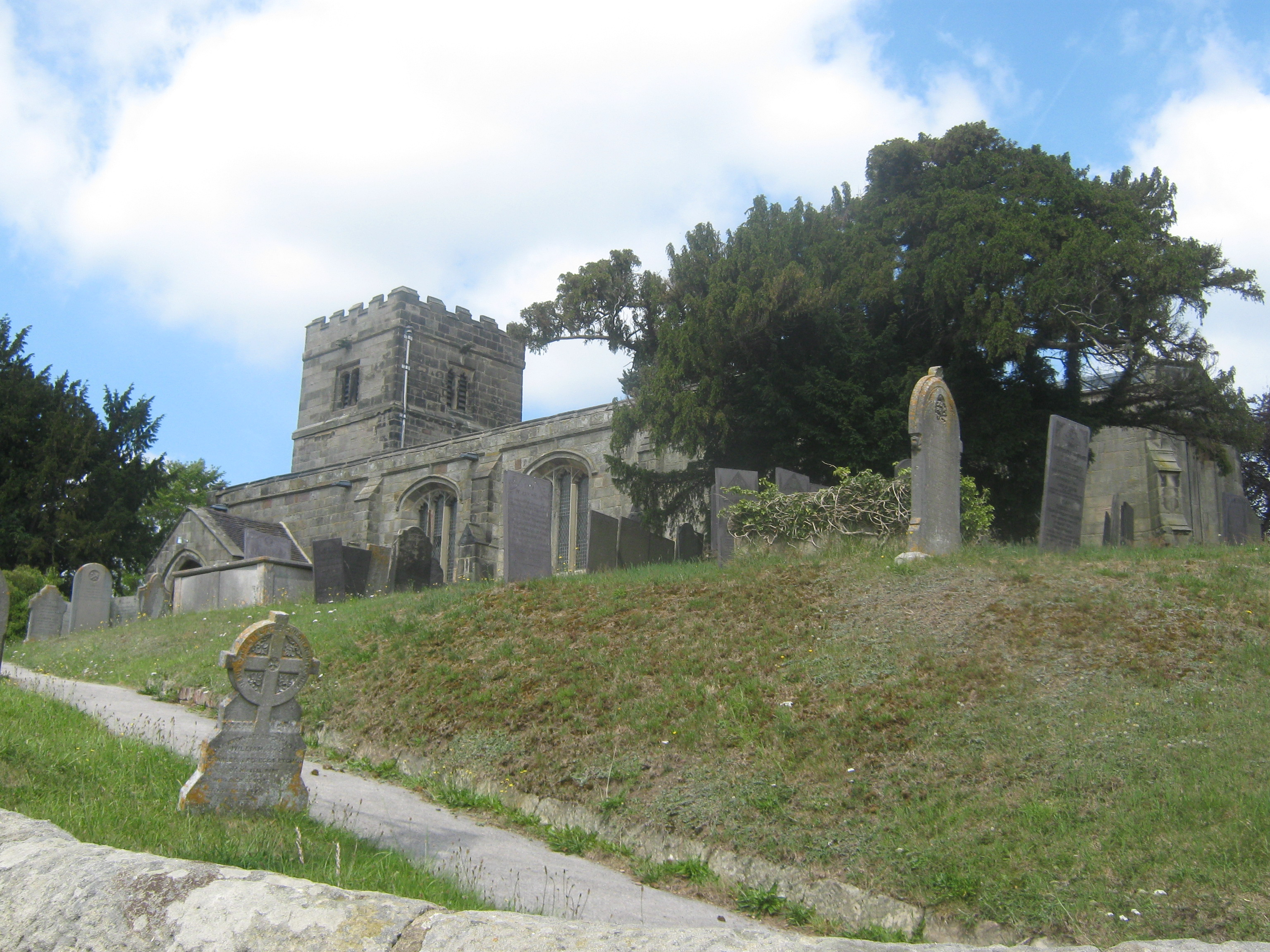
- All Saints' Church, Mugginton
- All Saints’ Church, Mugginton
- 52°58′57″N 1°34′46″W
- Location: Mugginton, Derbyshire
- Country: England
- Denomination: Church of England

History
- Dedication: All Saints

Architecture
- Heritage designation: Grade I listed

Administration
- Diocese: Diocese of Derby
- Archdeaconry: Derby
- Deanery: Duffield
- Parish: Mugginton and Kedleston

All Saints’ Church, Mugginton is a Grade I listed parish church in the Church of England in Weston Underwood, Derbyshire.

== History ==
The church dates from the 11th century. It comprises a west tower, nave with south aisle and porch and a chancel. Restoration was undertaken in 1894 when the arch between the belfry and the church was opened up.

It was repaired in 1925 when the tower and west end were grouted and pointed.

== Memorials ==
- Nicolas Kniveton (d. 1500)
- Joanna Knifeton (d. 1475)
- Samuel Webster (d. 1759)
- Samuel Pole (d. 1758)
- William Bateman (d. 1821)

== Organ ==
The pipe organ was built by Peter Conacher. A specification of the organ can be found on the National Pipe Organ Register.

== See also ==
- Grade I listed churches in Derbyshire
- Grade I listed buildings in Derbyshire
- Listed buildings in Weston Underwood, Derbyshire
