= Listed buildings in Stanton by Bridge =

Stanton by Bridge is a civil parish in the South Derbyshire district of Derbyshire, England. The parish contains twelve listed buildings that are recorded in the National Heritage List for England. Of these, two are listed at Grade I, the highest of the three grades, and the others are at Grade II, the lowest grade. The parish contains the village of Stanton by Bridge and the surrounding area. The listed buildings consist of a church, a bridge and causeway, houses and associated structures, farmhouses and a farm building.

== Key ==
Grade	Criteria
I	Buildings of exceptional interest, sometimes considered to be internationally important
II	Buildings of national importance and special interest

== Buildings ==
Name and location	Photograph	Date	Notes	Grade
St Michael's Church; 52.84062°N 1.45605°W		11th century	The church, which has been altered and extended through the centuries, was partly rebuilt in 1682, and was restored in 1865–66 by Ewan Christian. It is built in stone with tile roofs, and consists of a nave, a north aisle, a south porch, and a chancel. The west gable has a 12th-century semicircular-headed window, above it is a rose window, and on the apex is a bellcote with three bells. Also on the west front is a trefoil-headed lancet window, and a stepped corner buttress with a gargoyle. Above the three-light east window is a semicircular-headed dated stone plaque. Inside the church are small Saxon remains.	I
Swarkestone Bridge and Causeway; 52.85190°N 1.45345°W		Late 13th or early 14th century	The bridge over the River Trent and the causeway over flood meadows to the south, which carry the A514 road, extend for a quarter of a mile. There have been repairs through the centuries, and the bridge was replaced in 1801 by Thomas Harrison. The building is in sandstone, with repairs in red and blue brick. The bridge consists of five segmental arches, ramped in the centre, with hood moulds, and semicircular cutwaters with pilasters. The parapet walls are coped, they have a moulded string course, and are splayed at the north end. The causeway has a variety of buttresses and arches, 17 of which are medieval.	I
Ivy Farm Cottage; 52.84144°N 1.44913°W	—	Mid 18th century	The farmhouse is in red brick on a stone plinth, with floor bands, a dentilled eaves band and a tile roof. There are two storeys and attics, and three bays. The doorway and the windows on the front, which are casements, have cambered heads, and the windows in the east gable end have segmental heads.	II
Rectory House; 52.84032°N 1.45587°W	—	18th century	A farmhouse, later a rectory, and then a private house, it was extended twice in the 19th century. The house is in red brick with dressings in stone and brick, a dentilled eaves band, and slate roofs. There are three storeys and a T-shaped plan, consisting of a three-bay former farmhouse in the centre, a two-bay extension to the west, and a larger extension to the east with fronts of four bays. In the farmhouse is a segmental-headed doorway and a mix of windows, some casements, and other sashes. The west extension contains a segmental-headed doorway and windows. The larger extension has a hipped roof, a doorway with pilasters and a fanlight, a canted bay window, and sash windows.	II
St Bride's Farmhouse; 52.82286°N 1.45362°W		18th century	The farmhouse is in stone and red brick with stone dressings, quoins, a sawtooth eaves band, and a tile roof. There are two storeys and four bays, the west bay lower. The doorways and the windows, which are casements, have segmental heads. In the lower wing is a re-set 12th-century tympanum containing a carved animal. The main part contains a 12th-century semicircular-headed window with chevron decoration, and a 13th-century coffin lid with incised carving. Inside, there is a large inglenook fireplace.	II
Hollies Farmhouse; 52.84179°N 1.45041°W	—	Late 18th century	A farmhouse and cottage combined into one house, it is in red brick with a dentilled eaves band, and a tile roof with coped gables. There are three storeys and three bays, and a recessed two-storey two-bay wing on the left. In the centre of the main block is a gabled weatherboarded porch flanked by small windows. The other windows are small-pane casements, those in the lower floors with segmental heads, and in the top floors with flat heads.	II
Poplars Farmhouse; 52.84171°N 1.45303°W	—	Late 18th century	A rear wing was added in the 19th century to the farmhouse, which is in red brick with a dentilled eaves band and a tile roof. There are two storeys and attics, three bays, and a rear wing. The central doorway has a divided fanlight and a cambered head. The windows are sashes, also with cambered heads, and in the attic they are horizontally-sliding. In the upper floor of the rear wing are sash windows with moulded surrounds, and 20th-century windows below.	II
The Hollyhocks; 52.84153°N 1.44835°W	—	Late 18th century	A farmhouse in red brick with a sawtooth eaves band, and a tile roof with a brick coped gable to the west. There are two storeys and attics, and three bays. The doorway and the windows, which are sashes, some horizontally sliding, have segmental heads.	II
High Standing; 52.84117°N 1.44732°W	—	Early 19th century	A stone house with a floor band and a slate roof. There are two storeys and three bays. The central doorway has a large lintel, and above it is a blocked opening. The windows are casements with diamond glazing.	II
Gate piers and gate, Rectory House; 52.84103°N 1.45559°W	—	Early 19th century	The gate piers flanking the entrance to the drive are tall and in stone. Each pier has a moulded base, panelled sides, and a moulded cornice on which is a panelled segmental-headed coping stone. Attached to the eastern pier is a decorative wide iron gate, over which is a scrolled overthrow.	II
Rosedene; 52.84153°N 1.44821°W	—	Early 19th century	A red brick cottage with a sawtooth eaves band and a tile roof. There are two storeys and two bays. The doorway and the windows, which are casements, have segmental-headed windows.	II
Barn, St Bride's Farm; 52.82304°N 1.45413°W	—	Early 19th century	The barn is in stone with brick dressings, quoins, a dentilled eaves band, and a tile roof. There are two storeys and two bays. It contains segmental-arched openings with keystones, some of which are blocked, and slit vents.	II
