= Listed buildings in Kniveton =

Kniveton is a civil parish in the Derbyshire Dales district of Derbyshire, England. The parish contains 17 listed buildings that are recorded in the National Heritage List for England. Of these, one is listed at Grade I, the highest of the three grades, one is at Grade II*, the middle grade, and the others are at Grade II, the lowest grade. The parish contains the village of Kniveton and the surrounding countryside. Most of the listed buildings are houses, cottages and associated structures, farmhouses and farm buildings. The other listed buildings are a church and two chapels, a public house, and a milestone.

== Key ==
Grade	Criteria
I	Buildings of exceptional interest, sometimes considered to be internationally important
II*	Particularly important buildings of more than special interest
II	Buildings of national importance and special interest

== Buildings ==
Name and location	Photograph	Date	Notes	Grade
St Michael and All Angels' Church; 53.05042°N 1.68818°W		12th century	The church has been altered and extended through the centuries, it was restored in 1870, and the vestry was added in 1907. The church is built in gritstone with a lead roof, and consists of a nave, a south porch, a chancel with a vestry, and a west tower. The tower has a string course, lancet windows, two-light bell openings, an embattled parapet, and a short recessed spire. The south doorway is Norman, and has a round arch with chamfered imposts, a hood mould, and a keystone carved with a bear's head. The east window has three lights and contains Perpendicular tracery.	I
Agnes Meadow Farm; 53.02840°N 1.67968°W	—	17th century	The farmhouse is in limestone with gritstone dressings, quoins, and a tile roof. There are two and three storeys, and a lean-to extension at the rear. In the centre of the south front is a gabled porch, some windows have single lights, others are mullioned, with some mullions missing, and some windows have hood moulds.	II
Brook Cottage; 53.04753°N 1.69249°W	—	17th century	The house is in limestone with gritstone dressings, quoins, a string course, and a tile roof. There are two storeys, three bays, and a later single-storey wing on the left. The doorway has a moulded surround, and a dated and initialled pediment. The windows either have a single light, or are mullioned.	II
Brook Farmhouse; 53.04684°N 1.69223°W	—	17th century	The farmhouse is in limestone with gritstone dressings, a tile roof, and two storeys. On the front is a doorway, and the windows vary; some have single lights, some are later casements, and at the rear is a staircase window and a mullioned window. Inside, there is a cruck fame.	II
Horsley Farmhouse; 53.06105°N 1.70448°W	—	Mid 17th century	The farmhouse is in limestone with gritstone dressings, and a tile roof with coped gables and finials. There are two storeys and an unequal T-shaped plan. The house has two doorways with chamfered surrounds, one with a dated and inscribed lintel, and the other with a hood mould, and the windows are mullioned with up to six lights. Inside, there are timber partitions with wattle and daub infill, and in the loft is an upper cruck truss.	II*
Old Hall; 53.04726°N 1.69213°W		17th century	The house, which was extended and rebuilt in the 18th century, and was at one time a post office, is in limestone with gritstone dressings, quoins, and a tile roof with a coped gable and kneelers. There are two storeys and an L-shaped plan, the angle later filled in. In the west front is a central doorway with a rectangular fanlight, and a shallow canopy on consoles. The windows on the front are sashes that have keystones with heart motifs, and elsewhere are mullioned windows.	II]
Woodhead Farm; 53.03215°N 1.67678°W		17th century	The farmhouse is in limestone with gritstone dressings, mostly roughcast, and has a tile roof with coped gables and finials. There are two storey and attics, and a T-shaped plan, with a front range, and a rear wing with a stone slate roof. On the front is a porch, and the windows either have a single light or are mullioned with up to four lights, some with hood moulds. In the attic are two gabled dormers.	II]
James Lane Farmhouse; 53.04883°N 1.69383°W	—	Late 17th century	The farmhouse is in limestone with gritstone dressings, a tile roof, and two storeys. The doorway has a quoined surround and a rough stone lintel. There is one single-light window with a chamfered surround, and the other windows are mullioned.	II
James Cottage; 53.04856°N 1.69262°W		Early 18th century	The cottage, which has been extended, is in limestone with gritstone dressings, quoins. There are two storeys and an attic, and a front of one bay. There is a three-light mullioned window in each floor, and a later porch.	II
Milestone; 53.05748°N 1.70615°W		18th century	The milestone on the west side of the B5056 road consists of a flat upright stone. It is inscribed with the distances to Ashbourne and Bakewell.	II
Barn, Woodhead Farm; 53.03171°N 1.67653°W		18th century	The barn is in limestone with gritstone dressings, and a tile roof with coped gables, kneelers and finials. The openings are irregular, some with flat lintels, some with brick segmental arches, and one with a chamfered surround.	II
Gate piers, Woodhead Farm; 53.03199°N 1.67676°W		18th century	The gate piers at the entrance to the garden are in gritstone. They have a square plan, and are rusticated. Each pier has a moulded square cap and a ball finial.	II
Red Lion Inn; 53.04864°N 1.69251°W		Late 18th century	The public house is in limestone with gritstone dressings, quoins, and a tile roof. There are two storeys and a front in two parts. In the left part is a projecting porch flanked by sash windows with wedge lintels and keystones. The right part has irregular openings, including casement windows.	II
Barn, Brook Farm; 53.04704°N 1.69233°W	—	Early 19th century	The barn is in gritstone with quoins and a tile roof. Most of the openings have quoined surrounds and stone lintels, and include doorways, some blocked, sash windows, and a loft doorway.	II
Pethills Farmhouse; 53.03765°N 1.68943°W	—	Early 19th century	The farmhouse is in limestone with gritstone dressings, quoins, and a tile roof with coped gables. There are two storeys and attics, and a T-shaped plan, with a lower rear wing. The central doorway has a rectangular fanlight with Gothic glazing bars, and a flat hood. The windows have fixed upper lights with diagonal glazing bars, and casements below.	II
Primitive Medthodist Chapel; 53.04781°N 1.69131°W		1832	The chapel is in red brick on a stone plinth with a hipped tile roof. There is a square plan with a projecting porch, and the windows have round-arched heads.	II
Former Wesleyan Chapel; 53.04823°N 1.69053°W	—	1832	The chapel is in red brick with a rectangular plan. The front has a pedimented gable, and the walls are raised to form a parapet. In the centre of the front is a double doorway, and the windows have pointed heads and contain Gothic tracery.	II
