= Swarkestone Bridge =

British medieval bridge

- Swarkestone Bridge and Causeway
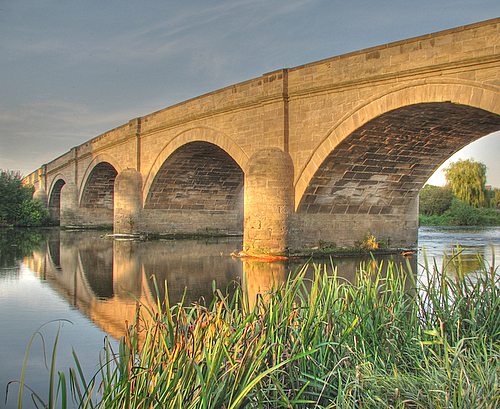
- 1795 section of Swarkestone Bridge

- Location within Derbyshire
- 52°50′52″N 1°27′8″W
- Type: Bridge and causeway
- Periods: Medieval
- Location: Swarkestone
- Region: Derbyshire
- Part of: A514 Main Road

History
- Built: First mentioned 1204

Site notes
- Material: Local sandstones
- Length: Almost 1 mile

Swarkestone Bridge is a medieval bridge crossing the River Trent between the villages of Swarkestone and Stanton by Bridge, about 6 miles south of Derby. It is currently Grade I Listed and a scheduled monument.

== History ==
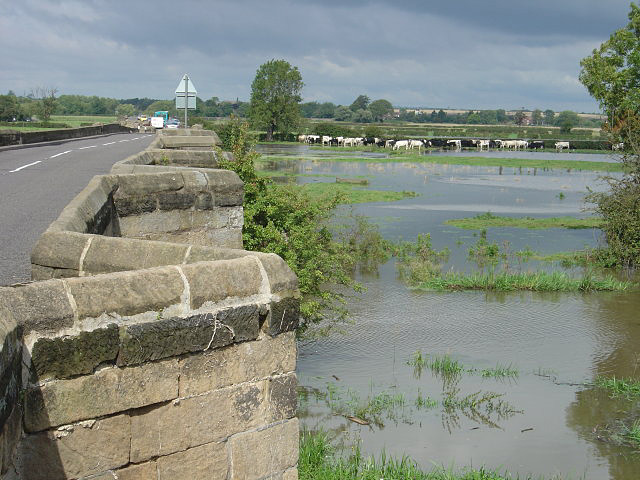
Causeway section

The bridge was built in the 13th century to cross the river and the surrounding marshes. The first mention of the bridge was in 1204 (when it was referred to as Ponte de Cordy), but it has been modified, repaired and rebuilt; the majority of the existing bridge dates, from the late 13th and early 14th century. The original bridge is thought to have been made of wood, and was then rebuilt in stone at the end of the 13th century. Three royal grants of tolls for bridge repair were granted between 1324 and 1347.

The bridge and causeway were part of the king's highway between Derby and Coventry. This had been the main route between the two cities since before the Norman Conquest, and there had been a river crossing on the site.

Swarkestone Bridge is, in total, just under a mile long and has 17 arches (six of which have been unaltered since medieval times); it is built primarily of local sandstone. It is the longest stone bridge in England. The section of the bridge crossing the main flow of the river was destroyed in floods in 1795 and was replaced between 1795 and 1797, at a cost of £3,550 (equivalent to £385,600 in 2025), with the present section of bridge. The work was reputedly designed by Thomas Sykes, the county surveyor. However, according to Nikolaus Pevsner, it was designed by Thomas Harrison.

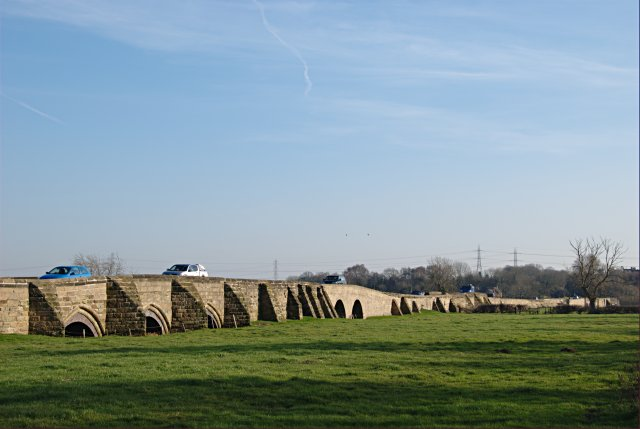
Causeway

The bridge has proved itself of strategic importance throughout the ages. It was for about 300 years the Midlands' main crossing of the Trent, and the only crossing between Burton-on-Trent and Nottingham. The road over the bridge was the main road into Derby from the south until the 18th century. In January 1643, it was the location of the minor battle during the English Civil War. In the Battle of Swarkestone Bridge, the bridge was defended by the Royalists against the Parliamentarians, but the outnumbered Royalists lost the day. In 1745, Swarkestone Bridge was the southernmost point of Bonnie Prince Charlie's advance on London, in his attempt to claim the British throne. Finding no reports of support from the south, they turned back to Derby and then retreated to Scotland and their final defeat at the Battle of Culloden.

During the Second World War, it was defended by gun emplacements and tank traps in case of a German invasion.

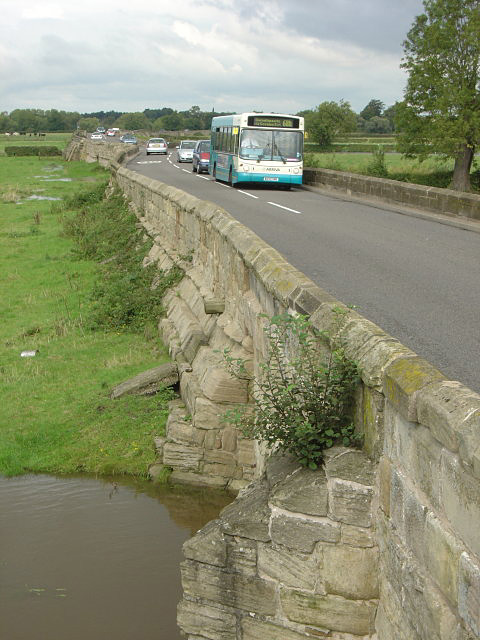
Bus crossing the bridge

== The bridge today ==
The bridge has been widened several times (the first in 1799 and recorded works in 1808, 1830 and 1852), but is undersized for modern traffic; in several places it is scarcely two lanes and cars are unable to pass at several points.

Though there is a weight limit of 7.5 tonnes, the walls of the bridge often take damage from traffic. In 2017, electronic weight sensors were placed at either end of the bridge to deter vehicles over the 7.5-tonne limit.

== Local legends ==
The bridge is the subject of several local legends. Its construction was said to have been financed by the two Bellamont sisters. Both had become engaged and were to throw a joint celebration; their fiancés, however, had to meet with the local barons on the far side of the river. Following a storm the Trent became swollen. Eager to return to their brides-to-be and their party, the men tried to ford the river on horseback. Both were swept away and drowned. The Bellamont sisters commissioned the bridge so that no one else would suffer the tragedy they had suffered. Neither sister married and both died in poverty having exhausted their fortune on building the bridge and are buried in a single grave in Prestwold, Leicestershire,

The bridge is supposed to be haunted by the ghosts of the two Bellamont sisters. Others have alleged the bridge is haunted by Bonnie Prince Charlie's troops. The most commonly reported phenomenon is the sound of horses approaching at speed when there is nothing about. Another legend says that the river must claim three lives every year in order for it to be 'pacified'. The bridge is a local accident black-spot, with 15 reported road-traffic accidents between 2008 and 2010.

== See also ==
- Grade I listed buildings in Derbyshire
- Listed buildings in Stanton by Bridge
- List of crossings of the River Trent
