= St James' Church, Smisby =

St James’ Church, Smisby
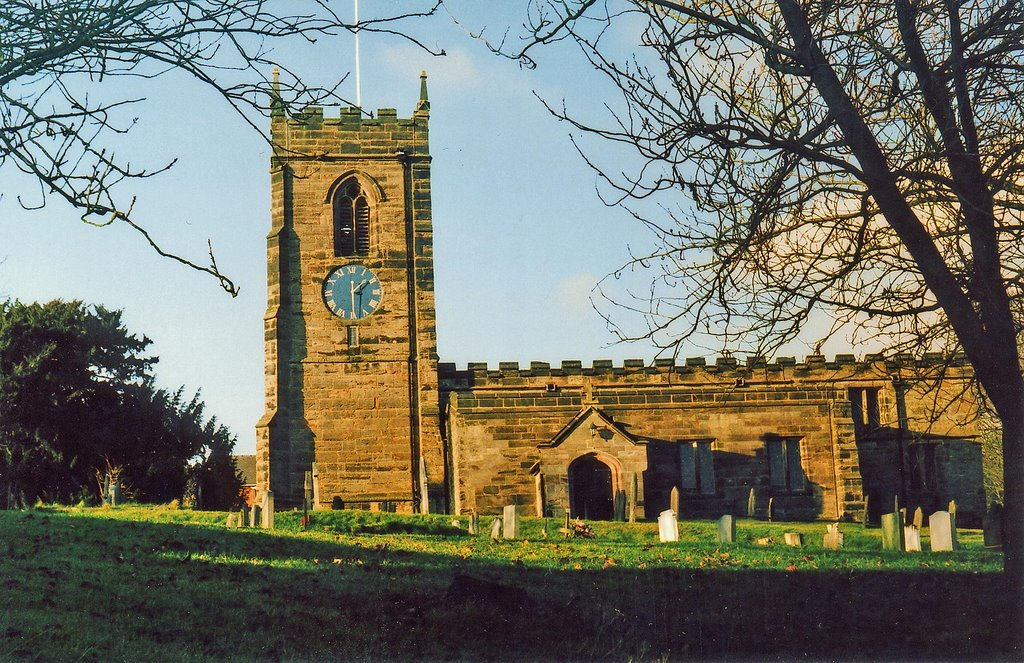
- St James’ Church, Smisby
- St James’ Church, Smisby
- 52°46′8.12″N 1°29′9.42″W
- Location: Smisby
- Country: England
- Denomination: Church of England

History
- Dedication: St James

Architecture
- Heritage designation: Grade I listed

Administration
- Diocese: Diocese of Derby
- Archdeaconry: Derby
- Deanery: Melbourne
- Parish: Smisby

St James’ Church, Smisby is a Grade I listed parish church in the Church of England in Smisby, Derbyshire.

== History ==
The church is medieval with elements from the 13th to the 16th century. It was restored between August 1895 and May 1896 and reopened on 22 May 1896. The old box pews and rotten flooring were removed, the plaster cleared from the walls, the caps and bases of piers were cleaned and renovated. The stonework inside the church was repaired and pointed. The glazing and stonework was renewed, and a new heating system by Haden was introduced. The floor was laid with wood blocks on concrete, the nave, aisle tower and porch were repaired with Hopton stone. The sacrarium was repaired with marble. A new altar table, pulpit, lectern and choir seating were provided.

The wooden panelling behind the altar is from Ashby-de-la-Zouch castle.

== Monuments ==
- Joan Comyn (14th cent)
- W Kendall (d. 1500)
- Henry Kendall (d. 1627)

== Parish status ==
The church is in a joint parish with:

- St Michael with St Mary's Church, Melbourne
- St Michael's Church, Stanton by Bridge
- St George's Church, Ticknall

== Organ ==
The church contains a pipe organ by J.H. Adkins. A specification of the organ can be found on the National Pipe Organ Register.

== See also ==
- Grade I listed churches in Derbyshire
- Grade I listed buildings in Derbyshire
- Listed buildings in Smisby
