= Listed buildings in Kirk Langley =

Kirk Langley is a civil parish in the Amber Valley district of Derbyshire, England. The parish contains 18 listed buildings that are recorded in the National Heritage List for England. Of these, one is listed at Grade I, the highest of the three grades, and the others are at Grade II, the lowest grade. The parish contains the village of Kirk Langley and the surrounding countryside. Most of the listed buildings are houses and associated structures, and farmhouses. The other listed buildings include a church, a cross in the churchyard, a memorial hall, a boundary post, and a milepost.

== Key ==
Grade	Criteria
I	Buildings of exceptional interest, sometimes considered to be internationally important
II	Buildings of national importance and special interest

== Buildings ==
Name and location	Photograph	Date	Notes	Grade
St Michael's Church; 52.94635°N 1.57520°W		Early 14th century	The church has since been altered and extended, and it was restored in 1839, and then in 1885 by Bodley and Garner. It is built in sandstone with roofs of tile and lead, and consists of a nave with a clerestory, north and south aisles, a chancel with a south vestry, and a west tower. The tower has two stages, a chamfered string course, angle buttresses with pilasters above, lancet windows, a west doorway with a two-light window above, a clock face, two-light bell openings, and an embattled parapet.	I
Churchyard cross 52.94660°N 1.57498°W	—	14th century (probable)	The cross in the churchyard of St Michael's Church is in sandstone. It consists of a hexagonal shaft about 1.5 metres (4 ft 11 in) high, with chamfers at the base turning into a square, standing on a square base.	II
Langley Hall; 52.95233°N 1.57484°W	—	16th century	A small country house, largely rebuilt in 1833–36, it is in red and yellow brick with stone dressings, on a chamfered stone plinth, with angle quoins, a string course, and a tile roof with coped gables and plain kneelers. There are two storeys, a front of five bays, and a lower wing on the left incorporating elements of the original house. The middle bay projects under a steep gable, and has polygonal angle turrets rising to pinnacles with ogee caps, and the two outer bays are under a single gable. The central porch has a Tudor arch and a hood mould, and the windows are sashes in chamfered surrounds with hood moulds. In the gables are arrow slit windows, and in the left bay is a mullioned window.	II
Lodge Farmhouse; 52.95322°N 1.56601°W		Early 17th century	The farmhouse, which was later extended by one bay to the right, is in sandstone, the extension is in red brick with sandstone dressings, and the roof is tiled with coped gables and moulded kneelers. There are two storeys and attics, and four bays. The doorway has a chamfered surround, the windows in the original part are mullioned, and in the extension are segment-headed casements. In the roof are two dormers with coped gables and moulded kneelers.	II
Hilltop Farmhouse; 52.95661°N 1.58810°W	—	Early 18th century	A red brick farmhouse that has a tile roof with coped gables and plain kneelers. There are two storeys, a double depth plan, and a south front of five bays. In the centre is a lean-to porch, and the windows are casements with segmental heads, some blocked. At the rear is a staircase window, and inside there are two inglenook fireplaces.	II
Langley House; 52.94702°N 1.57594°W		Early 18th century	The house is in red brick with a moulded eaves cornice, and a tile roof with coped gables and plain kneelers. There are two storeys and attics, a T-shaped plan, and a symmetrical front of five bays. In the centre is a doorway with a rectangular fanlight and a bracketed hood. The windows are sashes with gauged brick lintels, and in the attic are three two-light dormers with hipped roofs.	II
The Red House; 52.94665°N 1.57835°W	—	Early 18th century	The house, which was extended later in the 18th century, is in red brick with a dentilled eaves cornice and a tile roof. There are two storeys and attics, and a T-shaped plan, with a symmetrical front of three bays, and a later rear wing. The early wing has two bays, a floor band, sash windows with segmental heads in the ground floor, and casement windows above. In the later wing, steps lead up to a central doorway that has fluted pilasters, a traceried fanlight, triglyphs, and an open pediment. The windows are sashes with channelled lintels and keystones. On the south front is a canted bay window with a hipped roof.	II
Hall Farmhouse; 52.95407°N 1.57574°W		Mid 18th century	The farmhouse is in red brick, and has a tile roof with coped gables and plain kneelers. There are two storeys and attics, and a south front of three bays. In the centre is a doorway and a lean-to porch, the windows in the lower floors are sashes with segmental heads, and in the attic are casement windows.	II
Leeke Memorial Hall; 52.94652°N 1.57544°W		Late 18th century	The hall is in red brick with sandstone dressings, and has a tile roof with coped gables and plain kneelers. There is a single storey, and an east front of six bays. This contains a doorway with a chamfered surround and a blocked fanlight, and cross windows. The north front has a gabled porch with a Tudor arched doorway.	II
Meynell Langley; 52.95467°N 1.55429°W	—	Late 18th century	A small country house, it was remodelled in 1806–07, extended in 1818, and further extended and partly encased in 1829. The house is in red brick, partly rendered, and partly encased in sandstone. It has a hipped tile roof and two storeys. The south front is symmetrical with nine bays, an entablature in the centre part, and a sill band. In the centre is a portico with paired Ionic columns, an entablature, and pilasters. The doorway has a moulded architrave, and the windows are sashes, some with moulded architraves. At the rear is a brick service wing.	II
Meynell House; 52.94725°N 1.57328°W		c. 1800	The house, at one time a hotel, is in red brick with a parapet, and a tile roof with coped gables. The main block has three storeys, and a symmetrical front of five bays, and to the left is a two-storey single-bay wing. In the centre of the main block is a Tuscan Doric porch with pilasters and a triglyph frieze, and a doorway with rectangular fanlight. The windows are sashes with gauged brick lintels. In the wing is a three-light segment-headed window in the ground floor, and a casement window above.	II
Garden walls, Barn Croft; 52.95291°N 1.57435°W		Early 19th century	The walls are in red brick on a sandstone base. They are about 12 feet (3.7 m) high, surrounding an irregular four-sided enclosure. The walls have pilaster strip buttresses, and on the south side is a forcing wall of three semicircles.	II
Boundary post 52.96154°N 1.60061°W		Early 19th century	The boundary post is on the southwest side of crossroads on the A52 road, and marks the boundaries of the Langley and Brailsford parishes. It is in cast iron, and has a triangular plan, and a sloping upper part rising to a back plate with a curved top. The post is inscribed with the names of the county, the parishes and the manufacturer.	II
Hillside Farmhouse; 52.95502°N 1.58420°W	—	Early 19th century	A red brick farmhouse with a coved eaves cornice and a hipped tile roof. There are two storeys and a symmetrical front of three bays. The central doorway has a rectangular fanlight, and the windows are sashes, all the openings with wedge lintels.	II
Langley Barton; 52.94608°N 1.57137°W	—	Early 19th century	The house is in red brick with an eaves cornice and a hipped tile roof, gabled at the rear. There are two storeys and an L-shaped plan, with a symmetrical front of three bays, and a rear wing. The central doorway has a rectangular fanlight and a shallow hood, and the windows are sashes with wedge lintels.	II
Stable block west of Meynell House; 52.94750°N 1.57355°W	—	Early 19th century	The former stable block is in red brick with a sill band, a sawtooth eaves cornice, a clock face, and a tile roof. There are two storeys and an L-shaped plan. The south range has three bays, and a central elliptical carriage arch. The rear range has five bays, and both ranges contain windows with pointed arches and Gothic glazing bars.	II
Milepost; 52.94498°N 1.56638°W		Early 19th century	The milepost is on the south side of Ashbourne Road (A52 road). It is in cast iron, with a triangular plan and a sloping upper part rising to back plate with curved top. The milepost is inscribed on the top with the distance to London and the name of the parish, and on the sides are the distances to Buxton, Ashbourne, and Derby.	II
The Pastures; 52.93906°N 1.58493°W	—	Early 19th century	A red brick house with a dentilled eaves cornice and a tile roof. There are two storeys and attics, and a symmetrical front of three bays. In the centre is a doorway with a moulded surround and a traceried fanlight, and the windows are sashes with wedge lintels.	II
