= Mackworth Castle =

Castle in Derbyshire

Mackwoth Castle
- Amber Valley, Derbyshire
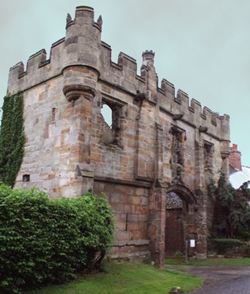
- The Grade I listed gatehouse of Mackworth Castle

Location
- Shown within Derbyshire.
- Coordinates: 52.9369°N 1.5352°W

Scheduled monument
- Official name: Mackworth medieval settlement including the castle gatehouse, part of the medieval open field system and a pinfold
- Designated: 3 July 1933
- Reference no.: 1017258

Listed Building – Grade I
- Official name: Gatehouse to Mackworth Castle, Lower Road
- Designated: 13 February 1967
- Reference no.: 1158635

Mackworth Castle was a 14th- or 15th-century structure located in Derbyshire, at the upper end of Mackworth village near Derby. The home for several centuries of the Mackworth family, it was at some point reduced to the ruins of a gatehouse suggestive of a grand castle. A survey from 1911 suggested that though the gatehouse resembled a castle, the rest of the structure may have been more modest. The remains are part of a designated Scheduled Ancient Monument.

== History ==
The date of construction of the castle is uncertain; ranges have been given from the early 14th to the late 15th centuries. The first Mackworth, Henry du Mackworth, appears in the Pipe Rolls of 1254, and the MackWorth lineage can be followed from the early part of the 15th century. Mackworth castle remained in the family until 1655 or 1656, when it was sold by Sir Thomas Mackworth, 3rd Baronet, who had relocated to Normanton in Rutland, to Sir John Curzon, 1st Baronet. Local legend says that the castle was destroyed during the Parliamentary Civil War by some ordnance on a nearby hill. However, Rev. Charles Kerry of the Derbyshire Archaeological Society questions whether the castle had already begun to decline before its purchase by Curzon, noting that, "Had Mackworth Castle been a place suitable for the reception of the Queen of Scots, Sir Ralph Sadler would not have overlooked it when en route with his charge for Tutbury." Sadler chose to lodge Mary, Queen of Scots, a decision which irritated Queen Elizabeth. He wrote in explanation on 5 February 1584, that he would not have done so had there been any appropriate houses anywhere near that town in which to house his charge.

Primarily, what remains of the building is its gatehouse, a square, heavily battlemented structure which could stand as a separate building in itself. According to English Castles: A Guide by Counties, the gatehouse was a Tudor-era addition; Kerry dates it to a little before 1500. Some understanding of the layout of the rest of the building can be derived from the rectangular spaces on the west of the gatehouse, which once formed courtyards. The ruined gatehouse is a Grade I listed building.

According to Anthony Emery in Greater Medieval Houses of England and Wales, 1300-1500: East Anglia, Central England and Wales, the structure may never have been very grand. He recounts that a 1911 survey suggested that the walls surrounding those spaces were likely "timber-framed on low rubble walls", similar to the nearby 14th-century house of the Tuchet family, for whom the Mackworths served as stewards. Emery writes that "[t]he gateway was no more than a display structure, a very early example of that hankering for a world of chivalry and romance that had already passed."

=== Hollywood reference ===
Mackworth Castle is the scene of events that take place in the 1954 movie The Black Shield of Falworth, starring Tony Curtis, which itself is based on the 19th century historical novel Men of Iron by the American author Howard Pyle.

== See also ==
- Grade I listed buildings in Derbyshire
- Listed buildings in Mackworth, Amber Valley

== Sources ==
- Kerry, Rev. Charles (1889). "Mackworth: its Castle and its Owners". In Derbyshire Archaeological Society (ed.). Journal of the Derbyshire Archaeological and Natural History Society. Vol. 11. The Society. pp. 1–9.
