= St Mary's Church, Marston on Dove =

St Mary’s Church, Hilton with Marston on Dove
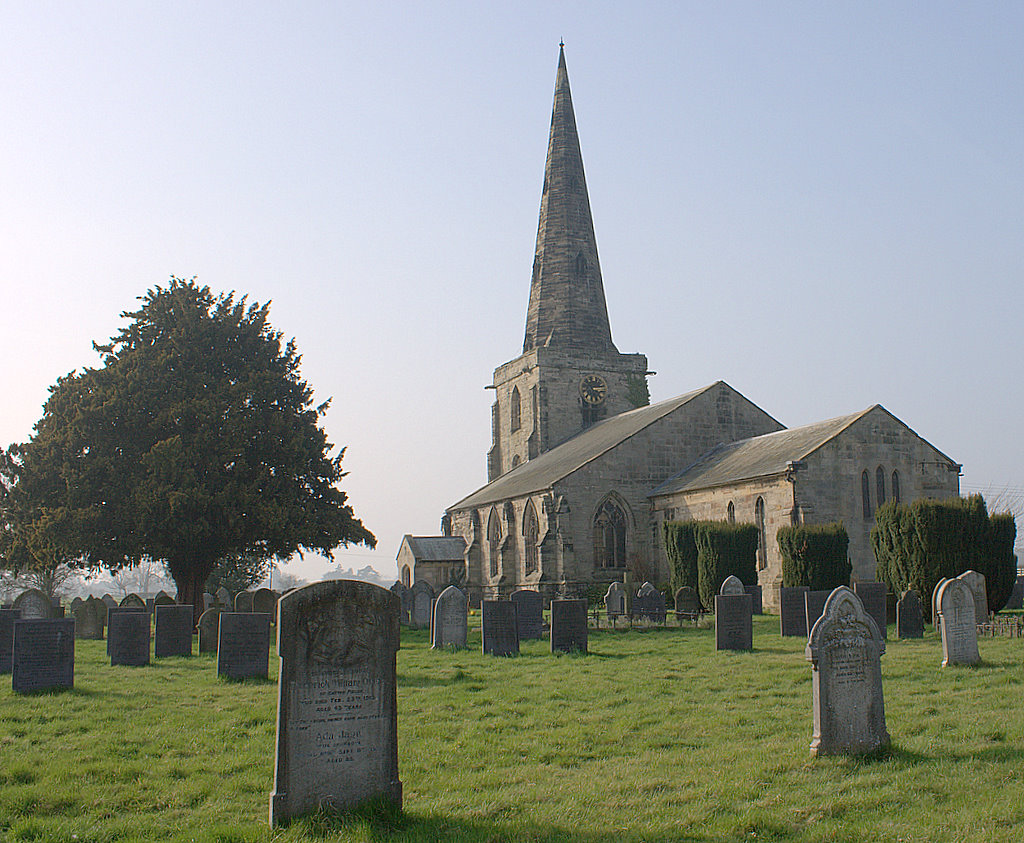
- St Mary’s Church, Hilton with Marston on Dove
- St Mary’s Church, Hilton with Marston on Dove
- 52°51′48.19″N 1°39′12.28″W
- Location: Marston on Dove
- Country: England
- Denomination: Church of England
- Website: www.stmaryshilton.org

History
- Dedication: St Mary

Architecture
- Heritage designation: Grade I listed

Administration
- Diocese: Diocese of Derby
- Archdeaconry: Derby
- Deanery: Dove and Derwent
- Parish: Hilton with Marston on Dove

St Mary's Church, Marston on Dove is a Grade I listed parish church in the Church of England in Marston on Dove, Derbyshire.

== History ==
The church dates from the 13th century. It is built of sandstone ashlar with Welsh slate roofs with stone coped gables. It comprises a west tower and spire, aisled nave with south porch and chancel. It was restored circa 1929 under the supervision of Derby architect Percy Heylyn Currey.

== Bells ==
The church contains the oldest bell in Derbyshire, which was cast in 1366 by John of Stafford.

== Organ ==
The pipe organ dates from the late 17th century and was originally in Sudbury Hall, Derbyshire, and later in Sudbury parish church. A specification of the organ can be found on the National Pipe Organ Register.

== See also ==
- Grade I listed churches in Derbyshire
- Grade I listed buildings in Derbyshire
- Listed buildings in Marston on Dove
