= All Saints' Church, Mackworth =

Church in Derbyshire, England

Coordinates: 52°56′2.34″N 1°31′58.07″W

All Saints’ Church, Mackworth
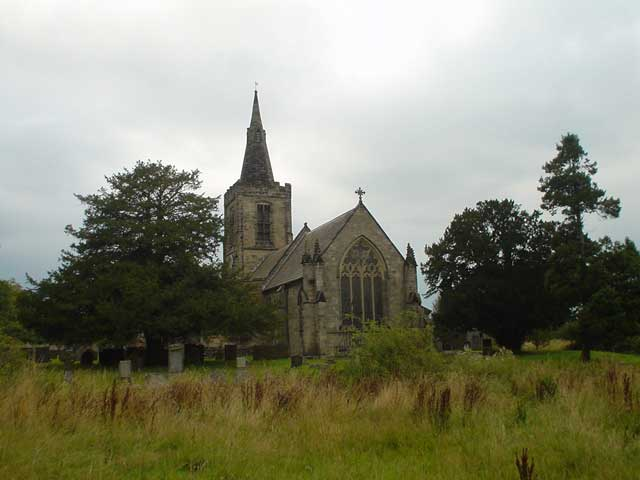
- The church in 2003
- All Saints’ Church, Mackworth
- Location: Mackworth
- Country: England
- Denomination: Church of England

History
- Dedication: All Saints

Architecture
- Heritage designation: Grade I listed

Administration
- Diocese: Diocese of Derby
- Archdeaconry: Derby
- Deanery: Duffield
- Parish: Mackworth

All Saints’ Church, Mackworth is a Grade I listed parish church in the Church of England in Mackworth, Derbyshire.

== History ==
The church dates from the 14th century. It was restored and reopened by the Bishop of Lichfield on Thursday 13 November 1851.

The reredos was designed by James K Colling of London and was added in 1878. The pulpit was obtained in 1896 and is made of Derbyshire alabaster and green Irish marble. The lectern was made in 1903 by Charles Lomas of Derby. The pipe organ, dating to 1870, was built by Lloyd and Dudgeon of Nottingham.

On the evening of 3 December 2020, a large fire destroyed the interior of the church, including the pipe organ. The cause of the fire was found to be arson. The suspect also burned down St Mary's Catholic School in Darley Abbey and Ravensdale School in Mickleover. There are plans to restore the church using insurance money.

== Memorials ==
- Edward Mundy (d. 1607)
- Richard French (d. 1801) by Hall of Derby

== See also ==
- Grade I listed churches in Derbyshire
- Grade I listed buildings in Derbyshire
- Listed buildings in Mackworth, Amber Valley
