= St Michael's Church, Stanton by Bridge =

St Michael’s Church, Stanton by Bridge
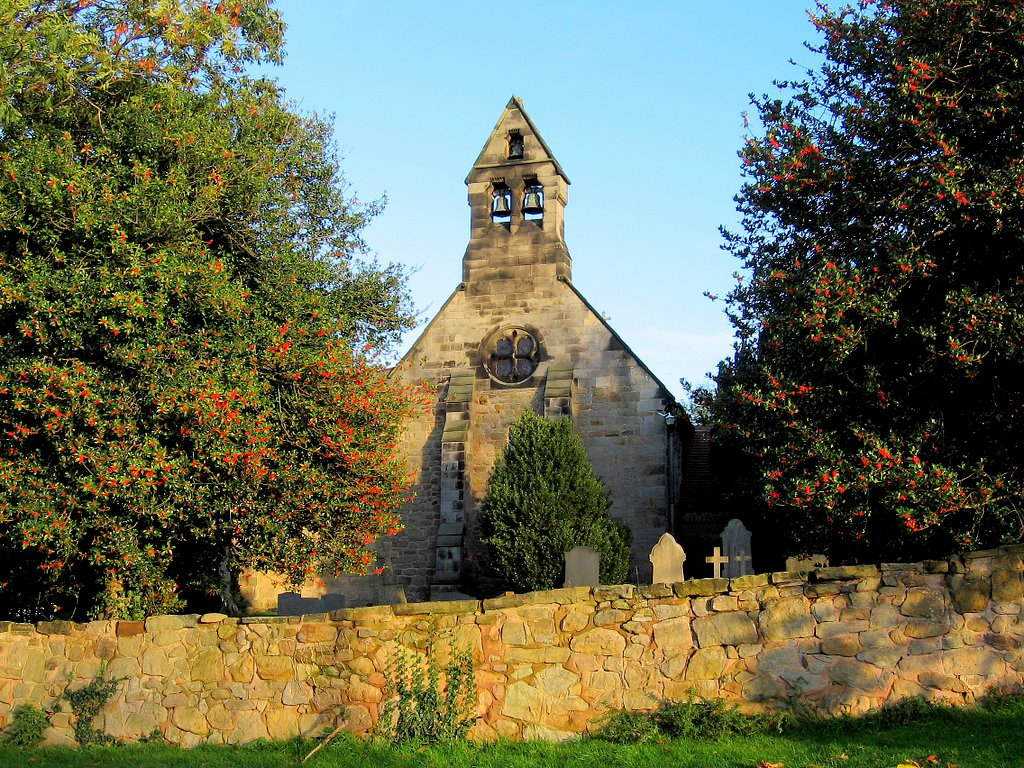
- St Michael’s Church, Stanton by Bridge
- St Michael’s Church, Stanton by Bridge
- 52°50′25.89″N 1°27′21.63″W
- Location: Stanton by Bridge
- Country: England
- Denomination: Church of England

History
- Dedication: St Michael

Architecture
- Heritage designation: Grade I listed

Administration
- Diocese: Diocese of Derby
- Archdeaconry: Derby
- Deanery: Melbourne
- Parish: Stanton by Bridge

St Michael's Church, Stanton by Bridge is a Grade I listed parish church in the Church of England in Stanton by Bridge, Derbyshire.

== History ==
The church is medieval with elements from the 11th to the 13th century. It was rebuilt around 1682 by the Rector, Augustine Jackson. A further restoration was undertaken between 1865 and 1866 under the supervision of the architect Ewan Christian with the contractor being John Wood of Derby.. It reopened on 9 May 1866. New roofs were erected over the nave and chancel. The walls were cleaned removing the thick coating of lime. Open benches of white varnished deal replaced the old pews, and an ornamental bell turret replaced the old wooden bell turret. Five stained glass windows by William Wailes of Newcastle were inserted.

== Memorials ==
- William Sacheverell (d. 1558)
- Richard Francis (d. 1530)
- Richard Sheppard (d. 1728)
- Thomas Shipton (d. 1711)

== Parish status ==
The church is in a joint parish with:

- St Michael with St Mary's Church, Melbourne
- St James' Church, Smisby
- St George's Church, Ticknall

== Organ ==
The church contains a pipe organ by Brindley & Foster. A specification of the organ can be found on the National Pipe Organ Register.

== See also ==
- Grade I listed churches in Derbyshire
- Grade I listed buildings in Derbyshire
- Listed buildings in Stanton by Bridge
