= St Michael's Church, Kirk Langley =

St Michael’s Church, Kirk Langley
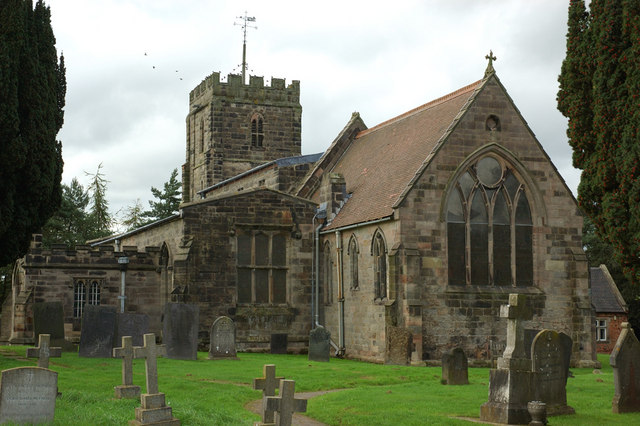
- St Michael’s Church, Kirk Langley
- St Michael’s Church, Kirk Langley
- 52°56′46.7″N 1°34′30.6″W
- Location: Kirk Langley
- Country: England
- Denomination: Church of England

History
- Dedication: St Michael

Architecture
- Heritage designation: Grade I listed

Administration
- Diocese: Diocese of Derby
- Archdeaconry: Derby
- Deanery: Duffield
- Parish: Kirk Langley

St Michael's Church, Kirk Langley is a Grade I listed parish church in the Church of England in Kirk Langley, Derbyshire.

== History ==
The church dates from the 14th century. It was restored in 1839 and again in 1885 by George Frederick Bodley and Thomas Garner. New choir stalls were added in 1914 to the designs of George Frederick Bodley and made by Robert Bridgeman of Lichfield.

== Memorials ==
- Godfrey Meynell (d. 1854)
- Alice Beresford (d. 1511)
- Henry Role (d. 1559) and his wife
- Charles Wilmot (d. 1724)

== Organ ==
The pipe organ dates from 1894 and was built by Wadsworth. A specification of the organ can be found on the National Pipe Organ Register.

== See also ==
- Grade I listed churches in Derbyshire
- Grade I listed buildings in Derbyshire
- Listed buildings in Kirk Langley
