= Listed buildings in Marston on Dove =

Marston on Dove is a civil parish in the South Derbyshire district of Derbyshire, England. The parish contains three listed buildings that are recorded in the National Heritage List for England. Of these, one is listed at Grade I, the highest of the three grades, and the others are at Grade II, the lowest grade. The parish contains the village of Marston on Dove and the surrounding area. The listed buildings consist of a church, its lychgate, and a small country house.

== Key ==
Grade	Criteria
I	Buildings of exceptional interest, sometimes considered to be internationally important
II	Buildings of national importance and special interest

== Buildings ==
Name and location	Photograph	Date	Notes	Grade
St Mary's Church; 52.86371°N 1.65512°W		13th century	The church has been altered and extended through the centuries. It is in sandstone with Welsh slate roofs, and consists of a nave, north and south aisles, a south porch, a chancel and a west steeple. The steeple has a tower with two stages, angle buttresses, and a two-light west window in the lower stage. The upper stage contains two-light bell openings, a clock face on the east side, and a plain parapet, and it is surmounted by a recessed octagonal spire with three tiers of lucarnes.	I
The Hall; 52.86298°N 1.65051°W		Late 18th century	A small country house that was altered in 1837, and greatly enlarged in 1887. It is in brick, mostly rendered, with a sill band, and hipped Welsh slate roofs. There are two storeys, a west front of seven bays, the middle two bays projecting, and a south front of three bays. On the front are French doors, and the windows are sashes.	II
Lychgate, St Mary's Church; 52.86391°N 1.65469°W		Early 20th century	The lychgate at the entrance to the churchyard has low sandstone walls, an openwork timber superstructure with arched braces, and a gableted Welsh slate roof.	II
