= Listed buildings in Mackworth, Amber Valley =

Mackworth is a civil parish in the Amber Valley district of Derbyshire, England. The parish contains 14 listed buildings that are recorded in the National Heritage List for England. Of these, two are listed at Grade I, the highest of the three grades, and the others are at Grade II, the lowest grade. The parish consists of the village of Mackworth and the surrounding area, The listed buildings consist of a church with associated structures, a ruined gatehouse, houses, cottages and farmhouses, a boundary post and a milepost, and a school.

== Key ==
Grade	Criteria
I	Buildings of exceptional interest, sometimes considered to be internationally important
II	Buildings of national importance and special interest

== Buildings ==
Name and location	Photograph	Date	Notes	Grade
All Saints' Church; 52.93625°N 1.52497°W		Early 14th century	The church has been altered and extended through the centuries, and was restored in 1851. It is in sandstone with Welsh slate roofs, and consists of a nave, north and south aisles, a south porch, a chancel with a north vestry, and a west steeple. The steeple has a tower with two stages, a chamfered string course, angle buttresses, arrow slits, and a clock face in the south side of the lower stage. The upper stage contains two-light bell openings and an embattled parapet, and it is surmounted by a recessed spire with lucarnes.	I
Gatehouse to Mackworth Castle; 52.93695°N 1.53521°W		c. 1495–1500	The remains of the gatehouse to probably a former manor house, it is in sandstone, with repairs and additions in red brick. Only the front and side walls remain. There are two storeys, a front of three bays, a chamfered plinth, a moulded string course with gargoyles, and an embattled parapet. In the centre is a four-centred arch with a depressed crocketed ogee hood mould, flanked by buttresses. At the angles are corbelled-out circular turrets.	I
The Thatched Cottage; 52.93652°N 1.53434°W		Late 17th century	The original part of the cottage is timber framed with lath and plaster infill, and is roughcast, the later part is in roughcast red brick, and the roof is thatched. The original part has two storeys and attics, and two bays, an open porch with a thatched roof, casement windows, and eyebrow dormers. The later part has two storeys, and the windows have segmental heads. Inside the house is exposed timber framing.	II
Bowbridge House; 52.93987°N 1.55180°W	—	Early 18th century	The house, which was later extended, is in red brick with sandstone dressings, a tile roof, hipped to the southeast, and two storeys. The east front has three bays, and a later bay on the right. The middle bay of the original part projects under a pediment, and has a moulded eaves cornice. In the ground floor is a recessed porch flanked by bay windows with parapets. In the porch is a Venetian-style doorway, and above it is a Venetian window with voussoirs and pieces of entablature. The other windows are sashes with channelled lintels and keystones. In the south front is a two-storey canted bay window and a conservatory.	II
Home Farmhouse; 52.93814°N 1.53844°W		Early 18th century	The farmhouse was doubled in size in the 19th century by the addition of a parallel range. It is in red brick on a chamfered plinth, with dentilled floor bands, and a tile roof. There are two storeys and attics and a double-depth plan, with a front of two gabled bays. In the centre of the front is a doorway with a rectangular fanlight, and the windows are casements.	II
Lower Vicarwood Farmhouse; 52.94835°N 1.53002°W		Early 18th century	The farmhouse is in red brick with stone dressings, on a stone plinth, with chamfered quoins, a floor band, a dentilled eaves cornice, and a tile roof. There are three storeys, a double range plan, and a symmetrical front of two bays. The central doorway has a rectangular fanlight, and the windows are sashes.	II
Old School House; 52.93345°N 1.51961°W		Early 18th century	A school and a house, later two houses, they are in red brick with a tile roof, half-hipped to the east. There are two storeys and four bays. In the centre is a gabled porch and a doorway with a segmental head. The windows are casements, those on the ground floor with segmental heads.	II
Tomb, All Saints' Church; 52.93606°N 1.52549°W	—	18th century	The tomb in the churchyard is in sandstone, and consists of a square chest tomb with a moulded base and sunk panels. On the south face is an inscription and a moulded cornice. On each face is a squat concave-sided obelisk carved with a flaming urn in high relief.	II
Bowbridgefields Farmhouse; 52.94347°N 1.54940°W		Mid 18th century	The farmhouse is in red brick with floor bands, a dentilled eaves cornice, and a double-range hipped tile roof. There are three storeys and a symmetrical front of three bays. The central doorway has a moulded surround and a semicircular fanlight, and most of the windows are sashes with cambered heads.	II
Castle Cottages; 52.93690°N 1.53494°W		18th century	A row of four cottages, later raised and combined into two cottages, they are in gritstone and red brick on a chamfered stone plinth, with a slate roof. There are two storeys and four bays. On the front are four doorways with segmental arches, two blocked. The windows are casements, those in the lower floor with segmental arches.	II
Boundary post 52.94201°N 1.55437°W	—	Early 19th century	The boundary post is on the southwest side of Ashbourne Road (A52 road), and is in cast iron. It has a triangular plan, with a sloping upper part rising to a back plate with a curved top. The post is inscribed with the names of the county, the parishes, and the manufacturer.	II
Milepost; 52.93901°N 1.54557°W	—	Early 19th century	The milepost is on the southwest side of Ashbourne Road (A52 road), and is in cast iron. It has a triangular plan, with a sloping upper part rising to a back plate with a curved top. The post is inscribed with the name of the parish, and the distances to London, Buxton, Ashbourne, and Derby.	II
The Old School and wall 52.93586°N 1.52923°W		c. 1868	The school is in red brick with blue brick decoration and stone dressings, and has a roof of red and blue tile with dentilled verges. It is in Gothic style, and consists of a main range of three bays, a lower wing on the front with a hipped roof, and a T-shaped service wing at the rear. The windows and the doorways in the main range have pointed heads, and in the wing the windows are mullioned. The attached boundary wall is coped, about 1 metre (3 ft 3 in) high, and contains square gate piers with gabled tops, and a gate.	II
Gateway and walls, All Saints' Church; 52.93591°N 1.52517°W		Late 19th century	The walls enclosing the churchyard on all four sides are in sandstone. On the south side is a gateway flanked by piers with pyramidal caps and wrought iron finials, and rising from them is a gabled arch. The gates are in timber with circular wrought iron panels and cresting.	II
