= All Saints' Church, Kirk Hallam =

Church in Kirk Hallam, Derbyshire

Coordinates: 52°57′36.66″N 1°19′5.85″W

All Saints’ Church, Kirk Hallam
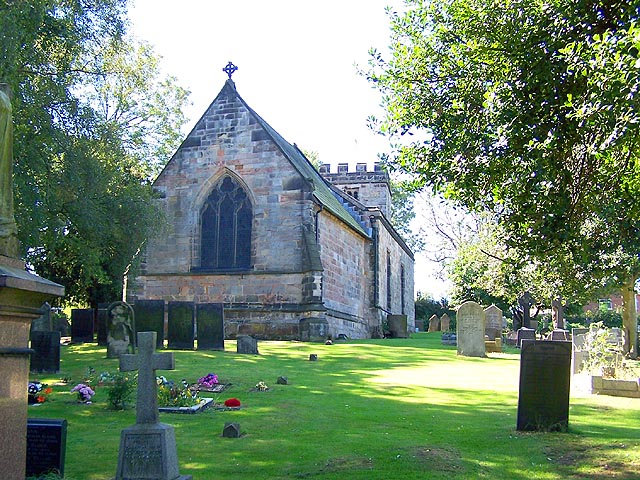
- All Saints’ Church, Kirk Hallam
- All Saints’ Church, Kirk Hallam
- Location: Kirk Hallam
- Country: England
- Denomination: Church of England

History
- Dedication: All Saints

Architecture
- Heritage designation: Grade I listed

Administration
- Diocese: Diocese of Derby
- Archdeaconry: Derby
- Deanery: Erewash
- Parish: Kirk Hallam

All Saints’ Church, Kirk Hallam is a Grade I listed parish church in the Church of England in Kirk Hallam, Derbyshire.

== History ==
The church dates from the 14th century. The nave was restored by George Edmund Street when new buttresses were added, a new porch constructed, the south wall was underpinned, the pews removed and replaced with open seating, the tower arch opened up, and the floor paved with Minton tiles. The church reopened on 21 August 1859.

== Organ ==
The pipe organ was built by Charles Lloyd and Co and dedicated by the Bishop of Derby on 7 May 1904. A specification of the organ can be found on the National Pipe Organ Register.

== See also ==
- Grade I listed churches in Derbyshire
- Grade I listed buildings in Derbyshire
- Listed buildings in Ilkeston
