= Smisby lock-up =

Village lock-up in Derbyshire, England

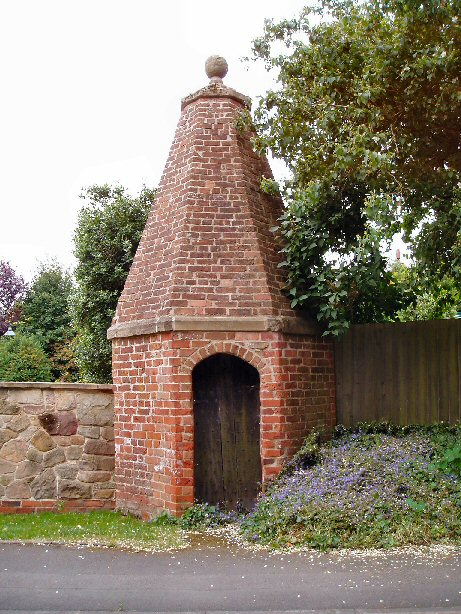
- “the most typical survival in the county”

- Location within Derbyshire
- 52.7682°N 1.4846°W
- Type: Village lock-up
- Location: Smisby, Derbyshire

History
- Built: late 18th century

Listed Building – Grade II*
- Official name: The Lock Up (Round House)
- Designated: 19 January 1967
- Reference no.: 1281737

The lock-up (or roundhouse) in Smisby, Derbyshire, England, is a village lock-up dating from the late 18th century. Such lock-ups were fairly common in England at that time and were used to hold miscreants, often drunkards, or other low-level offenders awaiting transportation to the local assizes, for short periods of time. The Smisby lock-up is built of brick and is a Grade II* listed building.

== History ==
Village lock-ups date from the mediaeval period. They were commonly constructed in rural areas, some distance from local courts, prisons or police stations, where there was a need for a structure for the temporary confinement of wrongdoers. They were frequently used to house drunkards, often overnight, in order to allow them time to sober up. It is estimated that around 200 lock-ups survive in England. (Note: The Prison History Project, run by the Centre for the History of Crime, Policing and Justice at the Open University, maintains an online database recording lock-ups in Great Britain.)

The Smisby lock-up dates from around 1790. It was built in response to an order from the Derbyshire Court of quarter sessions, dated January 1790, which required that, "all parishes in the county where there is not already a Round House, House of Correction, or Gaol, shall provide a place of temporary confinement for the reception of vagrants, paupers, felons and the like." The lock-up at Smisby, known locally as “The Jug”, is considered the best exemplar of the type now surviving in Derbyshire. (Note: Derbyshire Heritage describes it as “the most typical survival in the county”.)

== Architecture and description ==
Historic England dates the Smisby lock-up to the late 18th century. It is built of red brick with sandstone dressings. Clare Hartwell, in her 2016 revised volume, Derbyshire, of the Pevsner Buildings of England series, notes the pyramidal roof, topped by a ball finial. The lock-up is a Grade II* listed building.

== See also ==
- Listed buildings in Smisby

== Sources ==
- Hartwell, Clare; Pevsner, Nikolaus; Williamson, Elizabeth (2016). Derbyshire. The Buildings of England. New Haven, US and London: Yale University Press. ISBN 978-0-300-21559-5.
