= St Michael and All Angels' Church, Kniveton =

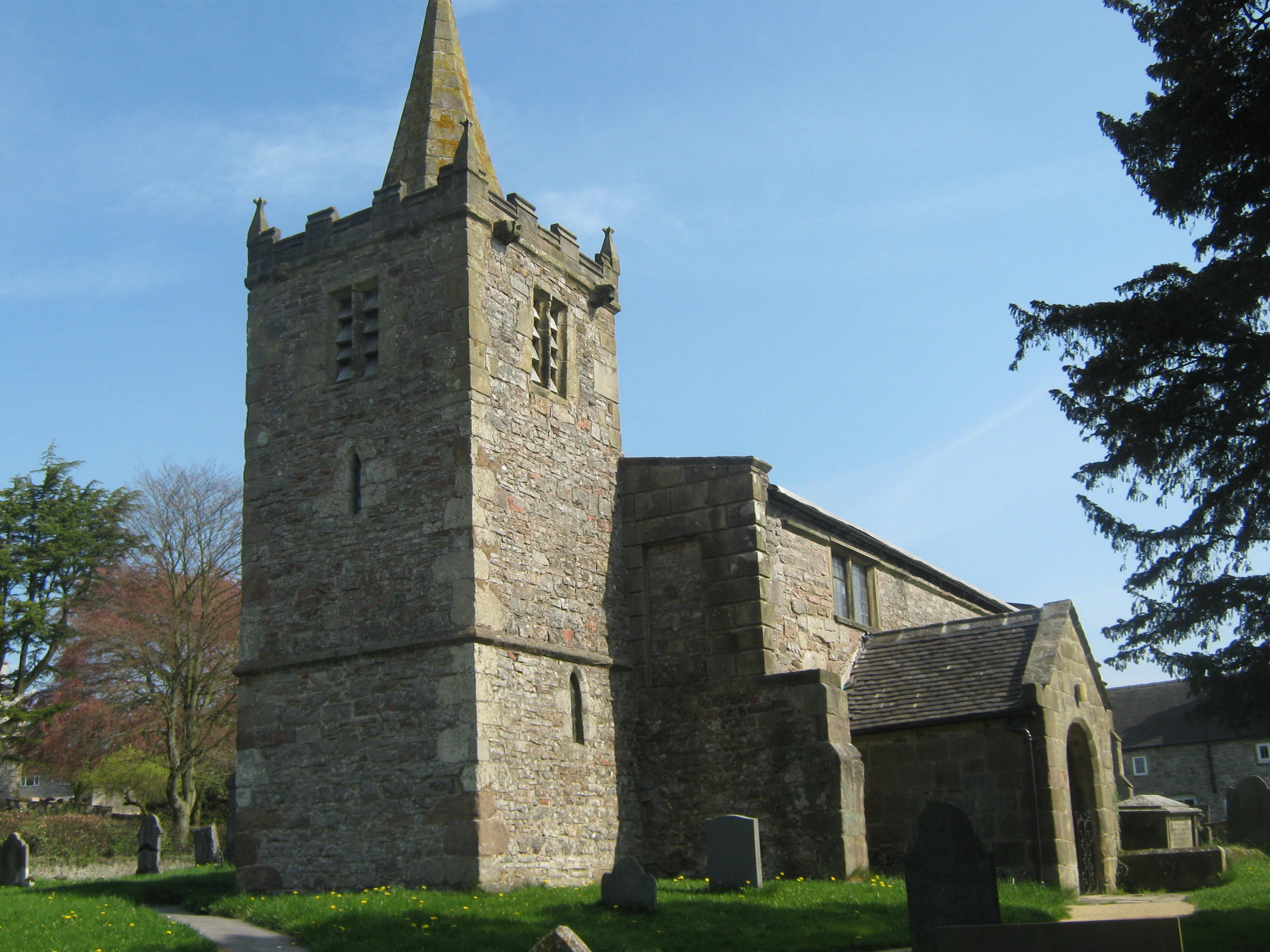
- St Michael and All Angels' Church, Kniveton
- St Michael and All Angels' Church, Kniveton
- 53°2′59.69″N 1°41′18.52″W
- Location: Kniveton
- Country: England
- Denomination: Church of England

History
- Dedication: St Michael and All Angels

Architecture
- Heritage designation: Grade I listed

Administration
- Province: Province of Canterbury
- Diocese: Diocese of Derby
- Archdeaconry: Derby
- Deanery: Ashbourne
- Parish: Kniveton

St Michael and All Angels’ Church, Kniveton is a Grade I listed parish church in the Church of England in Kniveton, Derbyshire.

== History ==
The church was originally a chapelry to St Oswald's church in Ashbourne and was dedicated to St John the Baptist.

It has Norman origins as evidenced in the plain semi-circular arch of the porch. It is sited on a small hill, built of coursed rubble gritstone with ashlar dressings in the Early English style and dates from the 13th century; it consists of chancel, nave, south porch and a low embattled western tower with a short spire. At some point in its history the dedication changed to St Michael and All Angels.

The church was repewed in 1842. In 1901, the Rev. E. E. Morris, rural dean of Ashbourne, remarked that only Kniveton Church required attention in the locality, and in 1907 it was restored by Currey and Thompson, the work being carried out by W. Smith and Son of Ashbourne.

== Bells ==
The tower has two 17th-century bells, one dated 1665 inscribed “God save the King, 1665” and has the mark of George Oldfield. The second has round the hanuch three Lambaric capital S's alternating with three cross fleurys, and the bellmark generally attributed to Richard Mellour of Nottingham.

== Parish status ==
The church is in a joint parish with

- St Philip & St James' Church, Atlow
- All Saints' Church, Bradley
- St Bartholomew's Church, Hognaston
- Christ Church, Hulland Ward

== See also ==
- Grade I listed churches in Derbyshire
- Grade I listed buildings in Derbyshire
- Listed buildings in Kniveton
