= Listed buildings in Weston Underwood, Derbyshire =

Weston Underwood is a civil parish in the Amber Valley district of Derbyshire, England. The parish contains 16 listed buildings that are recorded in the National Heritage List for England. Of these, two are listed at Grade I, the highest of the three grades, one is at Grade II*, the middle grade, and the others are at Grade II, the lowest grade. The parish contains the villages of Weston Underwood and Mugginton and the surrounding area, including part of Kedleston Park. The listed buildings in the park are a bridge and a cascade, a Gothic temple, and a sawmill and engine houses. Elsewhere, they include houses, cottages and associated structures, farmhouses and farm buildings, a church and two mileposts.

== Key ==
| Grade | Criteria |
|---|---|
| I | Buildings of exceptional interest, sometimes considered to be internationally important |
| II* | Particularly important buildings of more than special interest |
| II | Buildings of national importance and special interest |

== Buildings ==
| Name and location | Photograph | Date | Notes | Grade |
|---|---|---|---|---|
| All Saints' Church, Mugginton; 52.98250°N 1.57948°W | | 11th century | The church, which has been altered and extended through the centuries, is in sandstone with a lead roof to the body of the church and a tile roof to the porch. It consists of a nave, a south aisle, a south porch, a chancel, and a west tower. The tower has three stages with string courses, and the lower part is Norman. On the west side is a massive central buttress, and on the south side is a round-arched doorway. The bell openings have two lights and flat heads, and above are four gargoyles and embattled parapets. | I |
| Wilmot Cottage and Stores Cottage; 52.97980°N 1.56626°W | — | Early 18th century | A house, later three cottages, in red brick with floor bands and tile roofs. There are two storeys and an L-shaped plan, with a front of two bays. It contains bow windows, a bay window, casement windows and doorways with segmental heads. | II |
| Hollybush Cottages; 52.98922°N 1.55509°W | | Mid 18th century | A house and a cottage in red brick with a dentilled eaves cornice, and a tile roof with stone coped gables. There are two storeys and a front of three bays. The house on the left has three bays, the middle bay projecting, and containing a doorway with a segmental head. The windows are casements, in the ground floor under segmental arches, and in the upper floor with wedge brick lintels. | II |
| Gothic Temple, Kedleston Park; 52.97254°N 1.52675°W | | c. 1758–59 | A folly, later a house, in red brick faced in sandstone, with parapets, and in Gothic style. There is a single storey and three bays. Between the bays are triple-shafted columns with stiff leaf capitals. Each bay has a three-light pointed window with a crocketed ogee hood mould. In the spandrels and under the sill are blank shields, and above is a moulded cornice and parapet. Above the middle bay is a second parapet with a blind cross arrow slit, a lozenge frieze, and four crocketed pinnacles. | II* |
| Ireton Farmhouse and outbuildings 52.97089°N 1.53483°W | — | c. 1758–59 | The farmhouse and outbuildings are in red brick, partly rendered and painted, with roofs of Welsh slate and tile. They have an L-shaped plan, with two parallel north ranges, the rear range taller, and the farmhouse occupying three bays at the east end. The west range has a central block of three bays, single-bay pavilions at the ends and lower linking ranges. The pavilions have pyramidal roofs, and the north pavilion has an open cart entrance and a square turret with a weathervane. | II |
| Walls, Ireton Gardens; 52.97138°N 1.53709°W | — | c. 1761–63 | The walls enclosing the former garden are in red brick with sandstone copings. The enclosure is roughly square with two cross walls, and the north wall is a forcing wall with ten segmental curved projections. The walls contain doorways with segmental heads, and a cart entrance with a segmental head and a keystone. | II |
| The Bridge and Cascade, Kedleston Park; 52.96292°N 1.53597°W | | 1769–70 | The bridge is in stone, and consists of three round arches with moulded hood moulds, and fluted roundels in the spandrels. The piers project, and have apsed niches and a moulded sill band, and at the top are swags. Above is a fluted frieze, a dentilled cornice, and a balustraded parapet with cast iron balusters. The end walls curve outward and terminate in piers, and to the east is a rubblestone cascade. | I |
| Hall Close Farmhouse; 52.97537°N 1.54462°W | — | Late 18th century | The farmhouse is in red brick with a stone eaves band and a hipped Welsh slate roof. There are three storeys and an L-shaped plan, with a front range of three bays. The doorway and the windows, which are casements, in the lower two floor have wedge brick lintels, and in the top floor they have stone lintels. | II |
| Old Rectory Farmhouse; 52.98281°N 1.57915°W | | Late 18th century | The farmhouse is in red brick with a sawtooth eaves cornice and a Welsh slate roof. There is an L-shaped plan, with a front range of three storeys and three bays and a two-storey rear wing. In the centre of the front is a doorway, flanked by casement windows, all with wedge brick lintels. The upper floors contain casement windows, and at the rear is a full height staircase window. | II |
| The Old Beeches; 52.98479°N 1.57809°W | | Late 18th century | The house is in red brick at the front and in stone at the rear, and has stone dressings, a moulded eaves cornice, and a Welsh slate roof with stone coped gables and moulded and plain kneelers. There is an L-shaped plan, with a front range of three storeys and a north range of two storeys. The front range is symmetrical with three bays, and has a central porch on four chamfered wooden posts, with a fretwork frieze and an ogee roof. To the right is a blocked doorway, and the windows are sashes; all the openings have wedge brick lintels. Inside the rear range is an inglenook fireplace. | II |
| Church Farmhouse; 52.98213°N 1.57947°W | | 1784 | The farmhouse is in red brick, and has a tile roof with stone coped gables and plain kneelers. There are two storeys and a south front of four bays. The doorway has fluted pilasters, and the windows are casements, all the openings with a wedge brick lintel. | II |
| Inn Farmhouse; 52.97925°N 1.56666°W | | Early 19th century | A coaching inn, later a farmhouse, in red brick with stone dressings, a sill band, a moulded eaves cornice, and a hipped Welsh slate roof. There are two storeys, a front of five bays, and a lower rear wing. The doorway and the windows, which are sashes, have channelled stone lintels. | II |
| Mile Post at OS 293 425; 52.97905°N 1.56437°W | | Early 19th century | The milepost on the south side of Bullhurst Lane is in cast iron. It has a triangular plan with a sloping upper part and a back plate with a gabled top. On the top is inscribed the distance to London, and on the sides are the distances to Hulland Ward and Derby. | II |
| Mile Post at OS 287 438; 52.99179°N 1.57369°W | | Early 19th century | The milepost on the west side of Bullhurst Lane is in cast iron. It has a triangular plan with a sloping upper part and a back plate with a gabled top. On the top is inscribed the distance to London, and on the sides are the distances to Hulland Ward and Derby. | II |
| Saw Mill and attached Engine House, Kedleston Park; 52.96769°N 1.53171°W | — | Early 19th century | The saw mill and engine house are in red brick with tile roofs. There are two storeys and a T-shaped plan, the saw mill at the front with seven bays, the engine house on the right, and a lean-to cart shed at the rear. In the ground floor are three doorways, one with a timber lintel, one in Gothick style, and the other with a segmental head, and five Gothick windows, and in the upper floor are a doorway and five horizontally-sliding sash windows. To the right is a free-standing chimney. | II |
| Engine house by the Saw Mill, Kedleston Park; 52.96752°N 1.53150°W | — | Late 19th century | The engine house is in red brick, and has a tile roof with a raised ridge ventilator. The north front is gabled, it has a cart entrance flanked by doorways, and above is a single window. Adjacent to it is a tapering free-standing chimney stack. | II |
