= Listed buildings in Smisby =

Smisby is a civil parish in the South Derbyshire district of Derbyshire, England. The parish contains nine listed buildings that are recorded in the National Heritage List for England. Of these, one is listed at Grade I, the highest of the three grades, one is at Grade II*, the middle grade, and the others are at Grade II, the lowest grade. The parish contains the village of Smisby and the surrounding countryside, and the listed buildings consist of houses, farmhouses, a church with associated structures, a village lock-up and a war memorial.

== Key ==
Grade	Criteria
I	Buildings of exceptional interest, sometimes considered to be internationally important
II*	Particularly important buildings of more than special interest
II	Buildings of national importance and special interest

== Buildings ==
Name and location	Photograph	Date	Notes	Grade
St James' Church; 52.76870°N 1.48568°W		13th century	The church has been altered and extended through the centuries, and is built in sandstone. It consists of a nave and chancel in one cell with a clerestory, a south aisle, a south porch, a chancel, a north vestry, and a west tower. The tower has two stages, a chamfered string course, diagonal and angle buttresses, on the west front is a three-light window with a four-centred arch, and the south front contains a clock face. At the top are two-light bell openings, and an embattled parapet with corner obelisk finials. There are also embattled parapets along the nave and chancel.	I
Smisby Manor; 52.76831°N 1.48655°W	—	16th century	The house, which has been altered, is in sandstone and red brick on a chamfered plinth, with tile roofs. There is a south front of seven irregular bays. Towards the centre are two three-storey gabled bays, with sash windows in the ground floor, two cross windows in the middle floor, two casement windows in the top floor, and blocked single lights in the gable. To the right is a lower bay containing a French window and an open porch with four-centred arches. To the left are four two-storey bays containing casement windows, those in the upper floor in eyebrow dormers.	II
Daniel Hay Farmhouse; 52.78266°N 1.49110°W		Early 18th century	The farmhouse is in red brick on a chamfered blue brick plinth, with floor bands, a dentilled eaves cornice, and a tile roof. There are two storeys and attics, a T-shaped plan, and a front of two bays. On the front is a segmental-headed doorway, to its right is a canted bay window, and the other windows are casements with segmental heads.	II
Hillside Farmhouse; 52.76840°N 1.48200°W	—	Early 18th century	The farmhouse is in rendered brick on a chamfered plinth, with a floor band and a tile roof. There are two storeys and a symmetrical front of five bays. Four steps lead up to a central doorway that has a plain surround and a rectangular fanlight, and the windows are sashes.	II
Ivanhoe House; 52.76819°N 1.48235°W	—	Early 18th century	A house in rendered brick, with floor bands, a dentilled eaves cornice, and a tile roof with stone coped gables and plain kneelers. There are two storeys and a symmetrical north front of two bays. Two steps lead up to a central doorway with a flat hood, and the windows are casements. At the rear are three-light horizontally-sliding sash windows with segmental heads, and a tall staircase window.	II
Pitt's Farmhouse; 52.76840°N 1.48441°W	—	Early 18th century	The farmhouse is in red brick on a chamfered plinth, with floor bands and a tile roof. There are two storeys and a south front of two bays. The doorway and the windows have segmental heads, and there is a staircase window. Inside, there is an inglenook fireplace.	II
The Lock-up; 52.76827°N 1.48459°W		Late 18th century	The village lock-up is in red brick with sandstone dressings. It has a polygonal plan, and contains a doorway with a four-centred arch. The upper part is octagonal, with stone bands at the base and the top, and it is surmounted by a ball finial.	II*
Steps, gates and railings, St James' Church; 52.76851°N 1.48515°W		Mid 19th century	At the entrance to the churchyard are five sandstone steps leading to a gateway. The gate and gableted gate piers are in wrought iron, and over the gates is an arch with a lantern. The gates are flanked by low coped walls with spike railings, ending in gableted polygonal stone piers.	II
War memorial 52.76851°N 1.48502°W		1920	The war memorial stands in a triangular grassed area at a road junction in front of St James' Church, and is in marble. It consists of a Latin cross on a tapering plinth on a base of two steps. On the cross head is a carved wreath of flowers, and on the plinth is an inscription and the names of those lost in the First World War. The area is enclosed by iron railings.	II
