= Mackworth, Amber Valley =

Village in Amber Valley, Derbyshire, England

Coordinates: 52.935°N 1.535°W

Mackworth
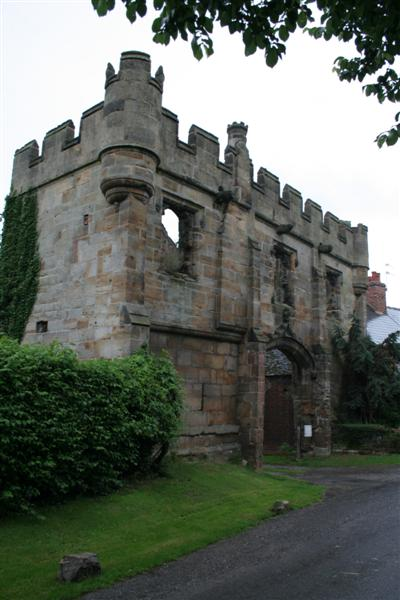
- Mackworth Castle.

- Location within Derbyshire
- Population: 229 (Including Kedleston. 2011)
- OS grid reference: SK313376
- District: Amber Valley
- Shire county: Derbyshire
- Region: East Midlands
- Country: England
- Sovereign state: United Kingdom
- Post town: DERBY
- Postcode district: DE22
- Police: Derbyshire
- Fire: Derbyshire
- Ambulance: East Midlands
- UK Parliament: Mid Derbyshire

Mackworth is a village and civil parish in the borough of Amber Valley, in Derbyshire, England. The 2011 Census recorded a population for the parish of 229. Mackworth is about two miles (3.2 km) from Derby and ten miles (16 km) from Ashbourne. It shares its name with the nearby Mackworth Estate in Derby.

== Heritage ==
Mackworth, a conservation village, is mentioned in the Domesday Book and has evidence of Roman occupation. The site of the original medieval village can still be seen in the slopes of the hillside. Historically, the parish also contained the neighbouring village of Markeaton, now within the Derby city boundary. In 1881 the population of Mackworth village was given as 253, whilst Markeaton was given as 758, making a total of 1,011 in the parish of Mackworth.

The village shares its stone-built All Saints' Church with Markeaton. The church has memorials to the Mundy family of Markeaton, whose arms date back to the reign of Edward the Confessor.

Close by is Mackworth Castle, seat of the Mackworth family until the death of Sir Thomas Mackworth in 1640. The castle estate was later the property of Lord Scarsdale.

== Notable residents ==
- Samuel Richardson (1689–1761), "father of the English novel", was baptised here in 1689.
- William Emes (c. 1729–1803), landscape gardener, moved to a farmhouse at Bowbridge House.
- Geoffrey S. Dawes (1918–1996), physiologist, foremost international authority on fetal and neonatal physiology.

== See also ==
- Listed buildings in Mackworth, Amber Valley
