= Smisby =

Village in Derbyshire, England

Coordinates: 52.77°N 1.49°W

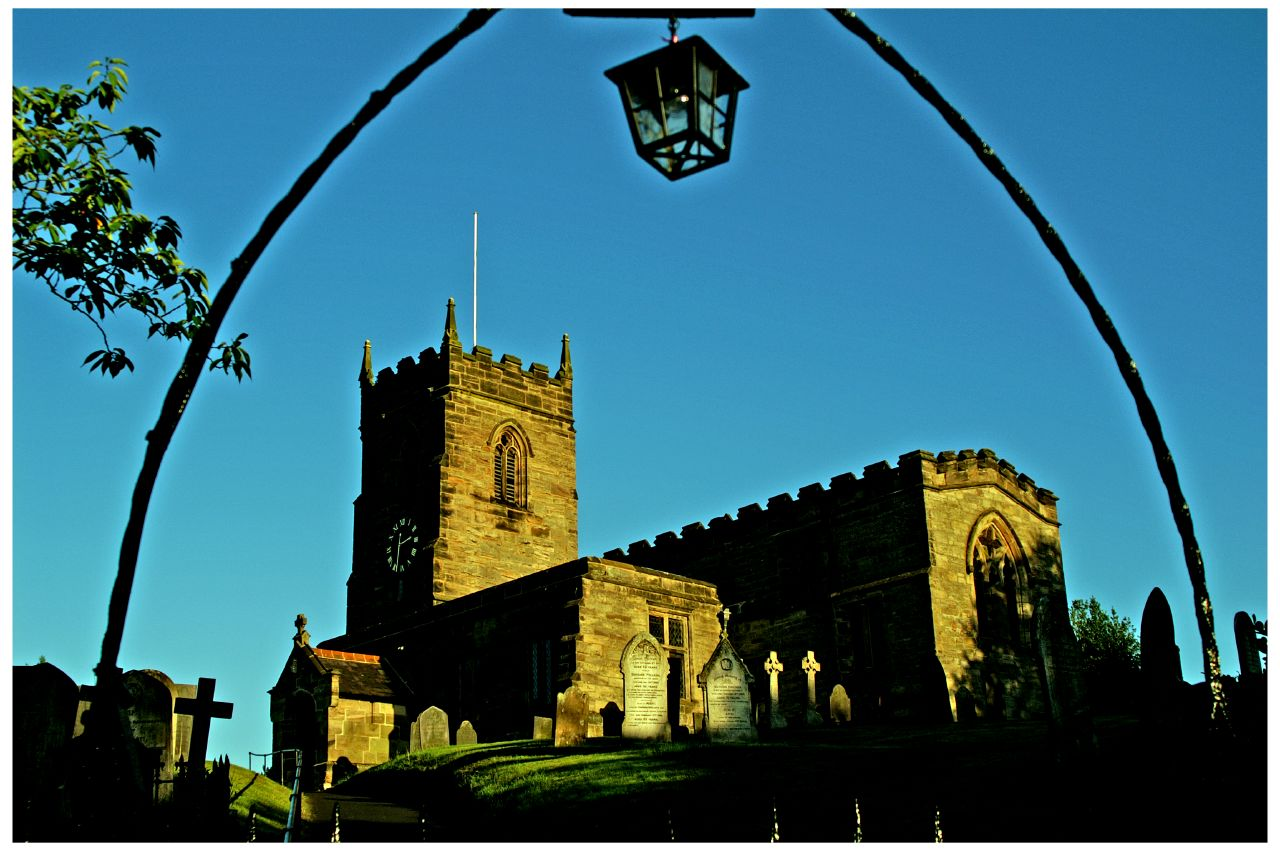
- Smisby's church of St. James. The church was originally dedicated to Saint Wystan of Repton and is mentioned in a charter of 1271.

- Location within Derbyshire
- Population: 270 (2011)
- OS grid reference: SK3419
- Civil parish: Smisby
- District: South Derbyshire
- Shire county: Derbyshire
- Region: East Midlands
- Country: England
- Sovereign state: United Kingdom
- Post town: ASHBY-DE-LA-ZOUCH
- Postcode district: LE65
- Dialling code: 01530
- Police: Derbyshire
- Fire: Derbyshire
- Ambulance: East Midlands
- UK Parliament: South Derbyshire

Smisby is an ancient manor, civil parish and small village in South Derbyshire, England. It is 4 miles (6.4 km) from Melbourne and near the Leicestershire border and the town of Ashby-de-la-Zouch. The village including the outlying farms and houses has a population just over 200 that occupies some 110 properties. The population at the 2011 Census had increased to 260.

== Early history ==
Smisby (Old Norse Smith's farm or settlement) is mentioned as Smidesbi in 1086 in the Domesday Book, which states under the title of "The lands of Nigel of Stafford":

In Smisby, Edwin had two carucates of land to the geld. There is land for 2 ploughs. There is now one plough in demesne and three villans have one plough. There is woodland pasture half a league long and six leagues broad. TRE worth 40 shillings now twenty shillings.

The Smisby lock-up is a village lock-up dating from the 18th century. Considered the best exemplar of the type in the county, it is a Grade II* listed building.

== Notable residents ==
- Hannah Bailey, an early emigrant to New Zealand, was born here on 2 February 1802. She married Charles Baker [later Rev.] of Packington on 11 May 1827 at St Mary's Church Islington, London, before leaving for the Mission fields in Bay of Islands, New Zealand, where they served as Missionaries to the Māori from 1828 until their deaths in 1875.
- Reuben Bosworth the clockmaker was born here around 1797.

== Ivanhoe ==
Within 200 metres of the village is a spot where a tournament was held that was described by Sir Walter Scott in his 1819 novel Ivanhoe. In chapter seven the text reads

The scene was singularly romantic. On the verge of a wood, which approached to within a mile of the town of Ashby, was an extensive meadow, of the finest and most beautiful green turf, surrounded on one side by the forest, and fringed on the other by straggling oak-trees, some of which had grown to an immense size.

This quotation is attributed to a visit Scott made to Coleorton Hall to visit Sir George Beaumont. They visited Smisby and climbed a now-demolished watchtower. Scott noted that a flat area towards Ashby Castle, but within Derbyshire, was reputed to be the place where ancient jousting tournaments had taken place.

== Gallery ==
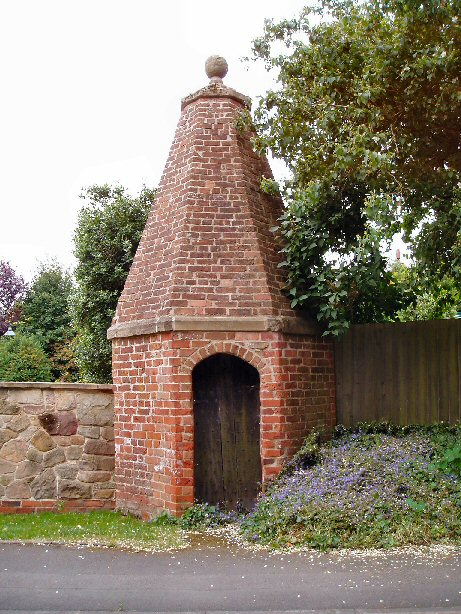
The Smisby lock-up

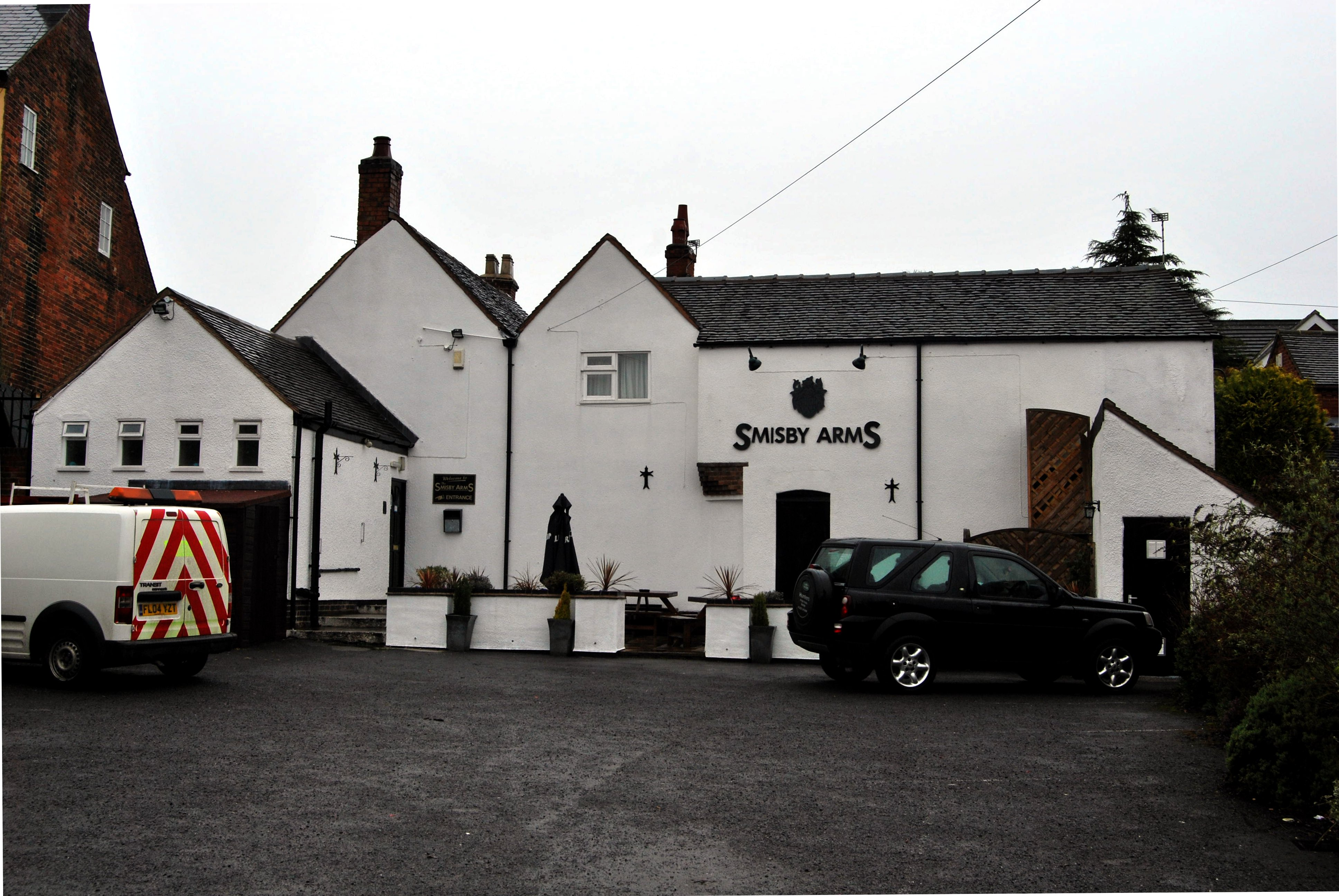
Smisby Arms

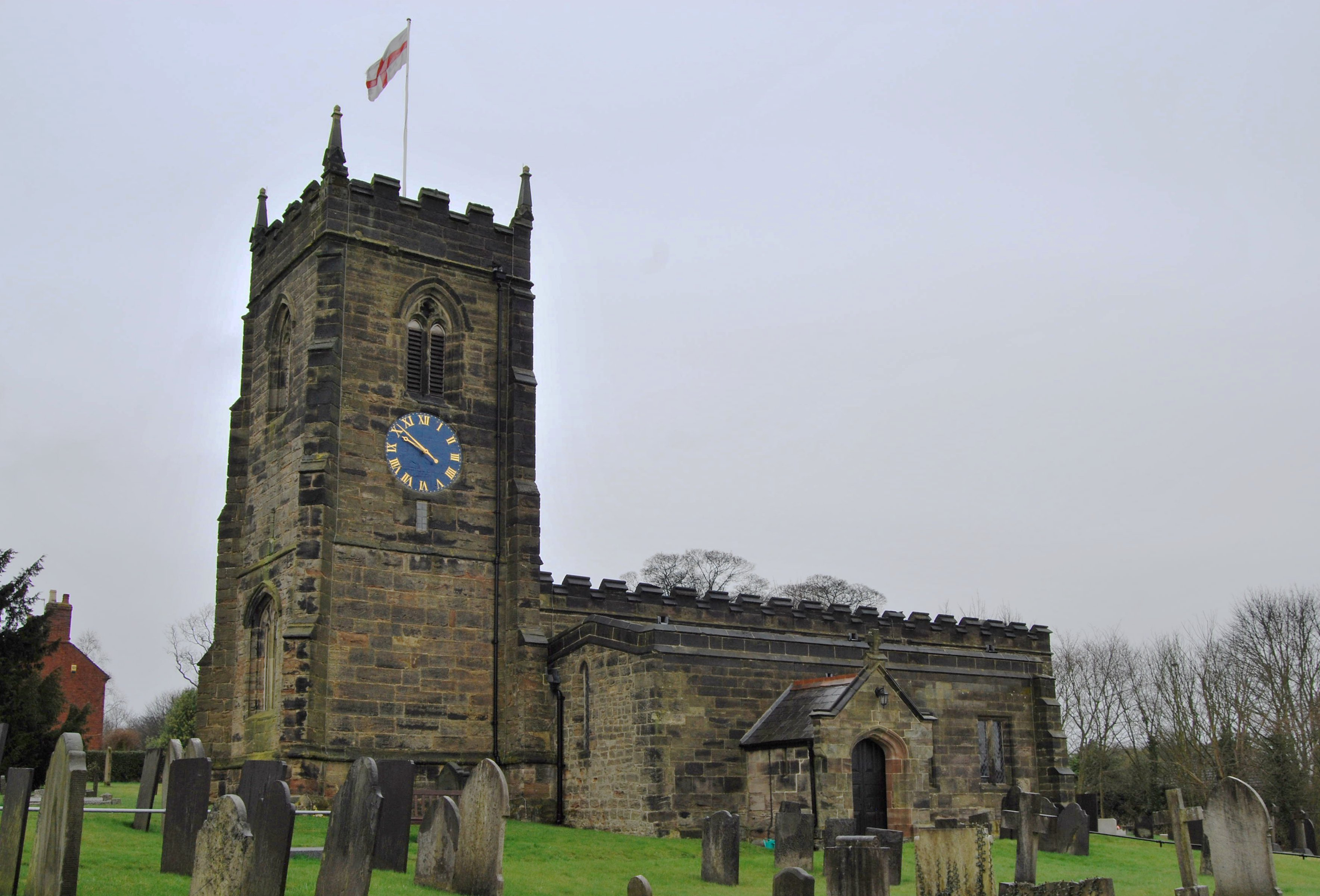
St James Smisby

== See also ==
- Listed buildings in Smisby
