= Marston on Dove =

Village in Derbyshire, England

Coordinates: 52.865°N 1.652°W

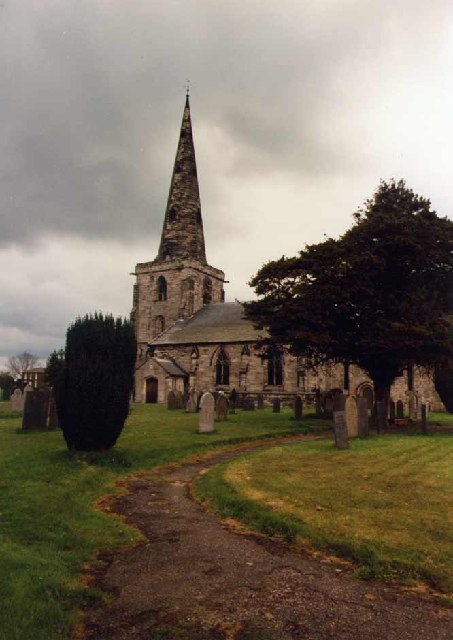
- The 13th-century church of St Mary

- Location within Derbyshire
- OS grid reference: SK235297
- District: South Derbyshire
- Shire county: Derbyshire
- Region: East Midlands
- Country: England
- Sovereign state: United Kingdom
- Post town: DERBY
- Postcode district: DE65
- Police: Derbyshire
- Fire: Derbyshire
- Ambulance: East Midlands

Marston on Dove (historically Marston Upon Dove) is a village and civil parish in South Derbyshire, nine miles (14 km) south west of Derby and two miles (3.2 km) east of Tutbury. The Church of St Mary at Marston has the oldest bell in Derbyshire, which was cast in Leicester in 1366 and inscribed with the words "Hail Mary" by John de Stafford.

== History ==
The village is mentioned the Domesday Book as being in the Hundred of Appletree and the County of Derbyshire, with 18 villagers, meadows, woodlands and a church. At the time of the Domesday survey, the village and surrounding land were held by the monks from the Priory of Tutbury, "a dependency of the Benedictine abbey of St. Pierresur-Dives in Normandy." The name of the village derives from Old English Mersc-tūn - a "marsh farm/settlement" (on the River Dove). The village lies on the River Dove and is six miles (9.7 km) north west of Burton on Trent, close to the Staffordshire border. Historically referred to as Marston upon Dove, the village was the largest in the parish which contained Hilton and Hatton.

The grade I listed Church of St Mary was built in the 13th century, but before this a church stood on the same site, as mentioned in the Domesday Book. It is believed to have the oldest bell in the Diocese of Derby. The churchyard has some Commonwealth War Graves from both the First and Second World Wars.

The River Dove used to run right to the south of the village, but at some time the meander was cut off and the river now passes further south. The Old River Dove site in the village is now a SSSI.

The village is not served by public transport, despite being close to the Crewe–Derby line. However, Tutbury and Hatton railway station is only 1.2 miles (2 km) to the west. National Cycle Network route number 549 runs through the village between Hurdlow and Waterhouses.

The population statistics are included in those for Hilton parish, which in the 2001 Census had 3,909, and in the 2011 Census had 7,714.

== See also ==
- Listed buildings in Marston on Dove
