= Kniveton =

Village in Derbyshire, England

Coordinates: 53.048°N 1.692°W

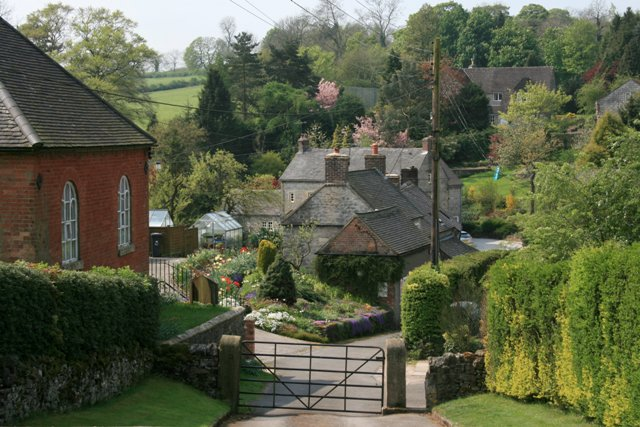

- Location within Derbyshire
- OS grid reference: SK207501
- District: Derbyshire Dales
- Shire county: Derbyshire
- Region: East Midlands
- Country: England
- Sovereign state: United Kingdom
- Post town: ASHBOURNE
- Postcode district: DE6
- Police: Derbyshire
- Fire: Derbyshire
- Ambulance: East Midlands
- UK Parliament: Derbyshire Dales

Kniveton is a village and civil parish in Derbyshire, England. It is in the Peak District, 3 miles (4.8 km) north east of Ashbourne and 6 miles (9.7 km) south west of Wirksworth. It is close to the reservoir at Carsington Water.

== History ==
=== Toponymy ===
The name Kniveton derives from Cengifu and tun, meaning the farmstead of a woman named Cengifu, an Old English personal name.

=== Early history ===
There are two scheduled barrows in Kniveton; Thomas Bateman excavated one in 1845. A later excavation revealed a riveted bronze dagger with an ivory pommel, an urn or food vessel, a perforated stone axe and an amber ring.

Kniveton is mentioned in Domesday, where it is recorded as Cheniveton. The manor belonged to the Kniveton family. The manor was sold after 1660 to the Lowe family and afterwards to the Pegge family who sold it to the Meynells.

During the 19th century the inhabitants worked in the cotton mills. Lime-burning and agriculture were other occupations.

== Governance ==
Historically Kniveton was a township, parish and village in the Western division of the county, part of the ancient Wirksworth hundred, and part of the Ashbourne Poor Law Union which came into existence in January 1845. The coat of arms on display in the church's stained glass window is that of the Kniveton family.

== Geography ==
Kniveton covers 1,974 acres (7.99 km^{2}). The underlying rock is limestone and the soil is heavy, much of it pastureland.

== Radio navigation beacon ==
Kniveton also has a VOR/DME Beacon used for air traffic control to the north of the village centre.

== Demography ==
=== Population change ===
Population growth in Kniveton from 1881–1961
Year	1881	1891	1901	1911	1921	1931	1951	1961
Population	272	269	266	268	260	253	265	276
Kniveton Ch/CP/AP

== Education ==
In 1715 John Hurd gave land for the endowment of a school at Kniveton. A church school was built in 1861. Today Kniveton CE Primary School serves the village and the surrounding rural community.

School	Type	Ofsted	Website
Kniveton Primary School	Primary school	112834	website

== Religion ==
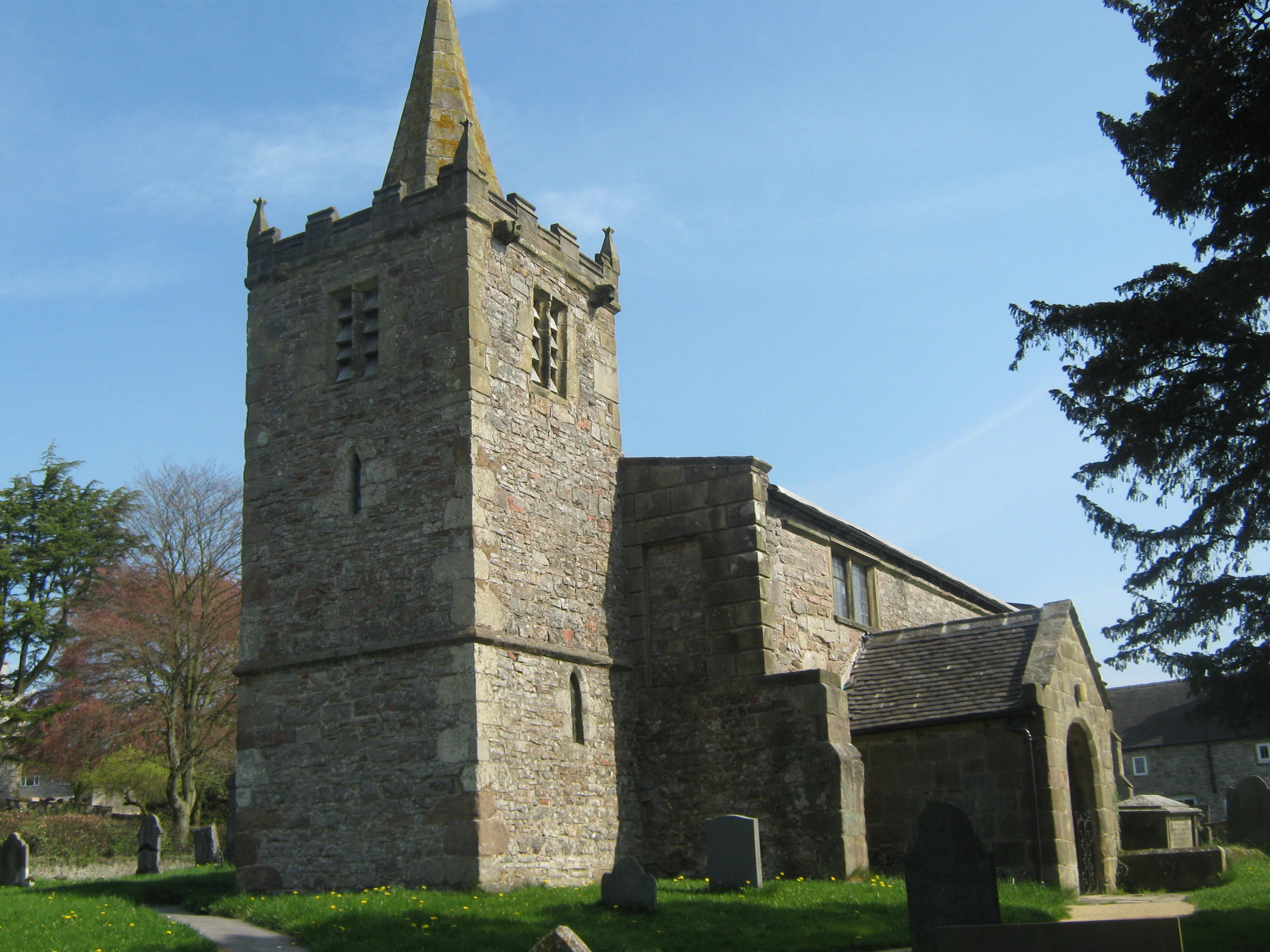
St. Michael's Church, Kniveton

The church in Kniveton was originally a chapelry to St Oswald's church in Ashbourne. St Michael and All Angels' Church has Norman origins as evidenced in the plain semi-circular arch of the porch. It is on a small hill and built of coursed rubble gritstone with ashlar dressings in the Early English style. It dates from the 13th century and consists of chancel, nave, south porch and a low embattled western tower with a short spire. The tower has two 17th-century bells, one dated 1665. St Michael's Church is a Grade I listed building.

The former Kniveton Methodist Church dates from 1832. It is built of red brick on a stone plinth with a tiled roof. It is a Grade II listed building.

== See also ==
- Listed buildings in Kniveton
