= Kirk Langley =

Village in Derbyshire, England

Coordinates: 52.946°N 1.572°W

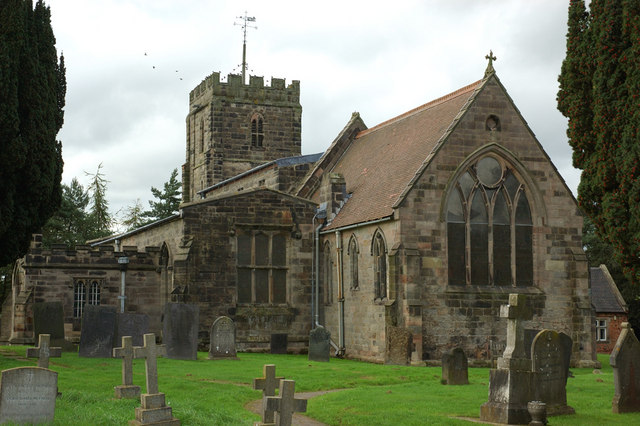
- Kirk Langley church.

- Location within Derbyshire
- Population: 686 (2011)
- OS grid reference: SK288388
- District: Amber Valley
- Shire county: Derbyshire
- Region: East Midlands
- Country: England
- Sovereign state: United Kingdom
- Post town: ASHBOURNE
- Postcode district: DE6
- Police: Derbyshire
- Fire: Derbyshire
- Ambulance: East Midlands
- UK Parliament: Mid Derbyshire

Kirk Langley is a village and civil parish in Derbyshire. The village is 4 miles (6.4 km) northwest of Derby and 2 miles (3.2 km) south east of Brailsford on the A52 road. The population of the civil parish taken at the 2011 Census (including Meynell Langley) was 686.

The Meynell family have held land at Kirk Langley since the reign of Henry I, and the village consists of two parts, Kirk Langley with the parish church, and Meynell Langley. The former Meynell Arms Hotel, now a private house, dates from the Georgian period. The Poles of Radbourne have also had landed interests in this area for many years. In the late 1940s a small council estate was built at Kirk Langley, close to the A52.

The Church of St Michael was built in the early 14th century on the site of a much older one, for which traces of a Saxon wall near the west door provides some evidence. It has a Perpendicular tower and contains heraldic glass and tiles. The screen under the tower is one of the oldest timber screens in Derbyshire. There are monuments to the Meynell and Pole families, including a large marble altar tomb commemorating Henry Poole, a prominent local politician who died in 1559, and his wife Dorothy, an elaborate memorial to Lieutenant William Meynell who was killed at Giurgiu on the Danube in 1854 when fighting with the Turks against the Russians, and an early Victorian memorial to a Meynell 'who was deprived of his life in a collision of carriages' in Clay Cross tunnel.

Leeke Memorial Hall was the village school until 1879. It is now the centre of many village activities, accommodating many of the village's societies. It is named after the Rev W. M. Leeke. Until 1952, when mains water reached the village, the ancient Maple Well provided the water supply. The village has a Church of England primary school in Moor Lane, which has about ninety pupils.

== Notable residents ==
- George Barrington, cricketer, died here.

== See also ==
- Listed buildings in Kirk Langley
