= Stanton by Bridge =

Village in Derbyshire, England

Coordinates: 52.842°N 1.448°W

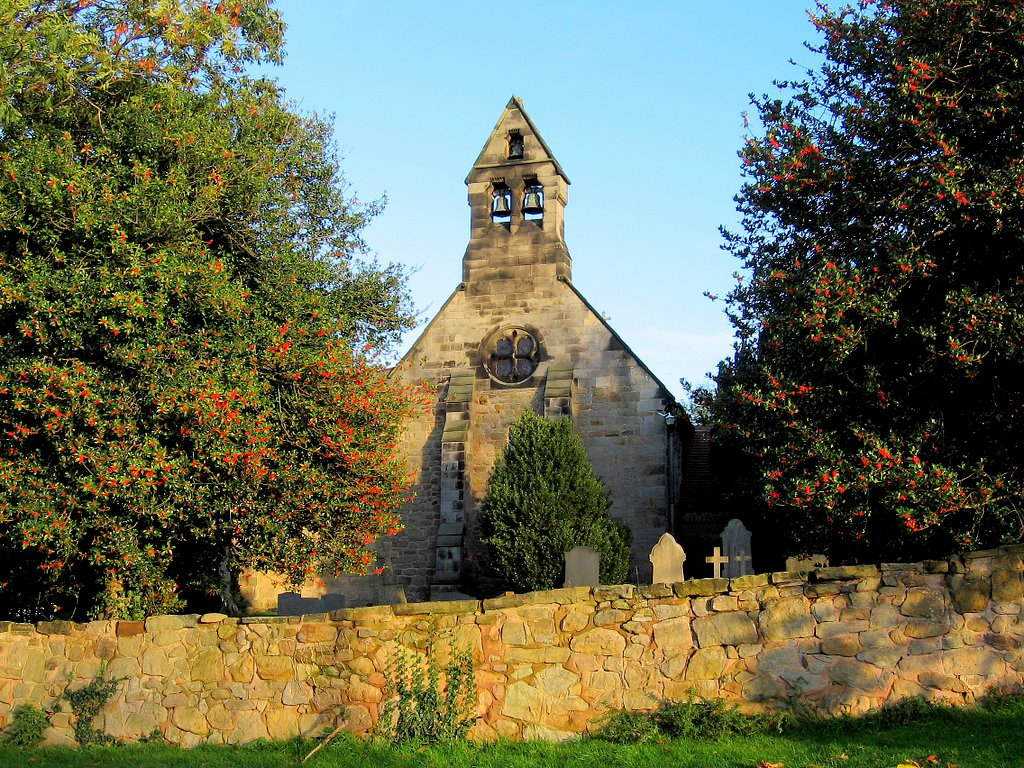
- St Michael's Church is on high ground

- Location within Derbyshire
- Population: 246 (2011)
- OS grid reference: SK372273
- District: South Derbyshire
- Shire county: Derbyshire
- Region: East Midlands
- Country: England
- Sovereign state: United Kingdom
- Post town: DERBY
- Postcode district: DE73
- Police: Derbyshire
- Fire: Derbyshire
- Ambulance: East Midlands

Stanton by Bridge is a village and civil parish in the English county of Derbyshire. The population of the civil parish at the 2011 census was 246.

== Description ==
St Michael's Church is on some of the highest ground. The church mostly dates from the 13th and 14th centuries, though with some Norman stonework. The porches and roofs of the church were rebuilt in 1860.

As its name suggests Stanton by Bridge is located next to a major bridge: the ancient Swarkestone Bridge, which carries the main A514 road over the River Trent.

Administratively, Stanton by Bridge forms part of the district of South Derbyshire.

== See also ==
- Listed buildings in Stanton by Bridge
