= Weston Underwood, Derbyshire =

Village in Derbyshire, England

Coordinates: 52.979°N 1.566°W

Weston Underwood
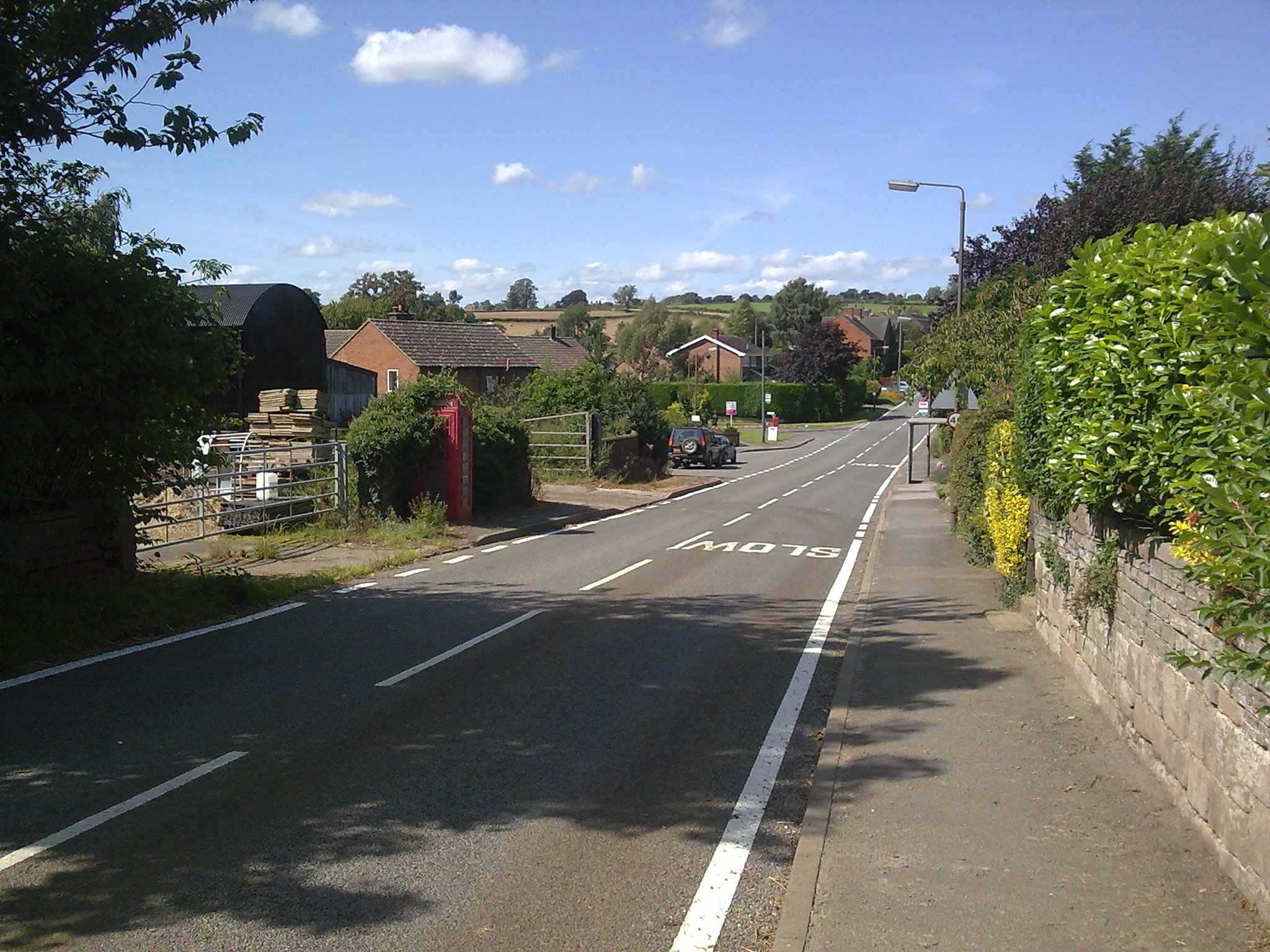
- Weston Underwood

- Location within Derbyshire
- Population: 374 (2011)_
- OS grid reference: SK2942
- Civil parish: Weston Underwood
- District: Amber Valley
- Shire county: Derbyshire
- Region: East Midlands
- Country: England
- Sovereign state: United Kingdom
- Post town: Ashbourne
- Postcode district: DE6
- Dialling code: 01335
- Police: Derbyshire
- Fire: Derbyshire
- Ambulance: East Midlands
- UK Parliament: Mid Derbyshire

Weston Underwood is an agricultural village and civil parish in the Amber Valley district of Derbyshire. The population of the civil parish (comprising the villages of Weston Underwood, Mugginton and Mugginton Lane End) as taken at the 2011 Census was 374. It is just over five miles (8 km) from Derby. Nearby places are Mugginton, Kedleston Hall and Carsington Water.

== History ==
Weston Underwood is mentioned in the Domesday Book.

In 1086, the book notes that

"In Weston Underwood, Wolfsige had 1 carucate of land to the geld. There is land for one plough. There is now one ploughs in demesne and six villans and six bordars have two ploughs.Therebare six acres of pasture and woodland pasture a league long and half a league broad. Value was 40 shillings now twenty shillings. Gulbert holds it for Ralph de Buron."

== See also ==
- Listed buildings in Weston Underwood, Derbyshire
