= Denby railway station =

Former railway station in Derbyshire, England

Denby
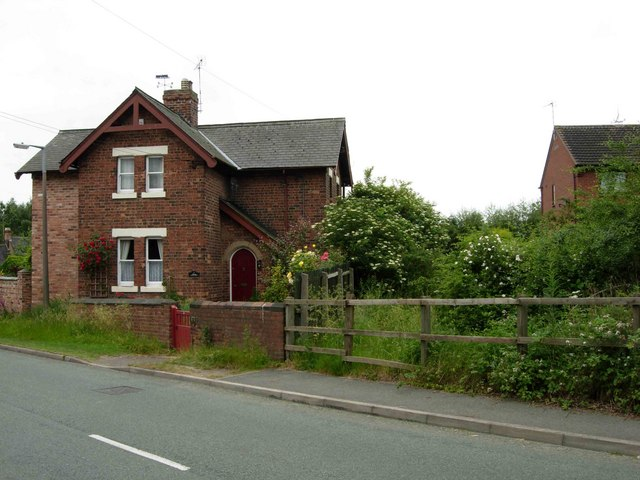
- The station house in 2006

General information
- Location: Denby, Amber Valley; England
- Coordinates: 53.0211°N 1.4256°W

Other information
- Status: Disused

History
- Pre-grouping: Midland Railway
- Post-grouping: London Midland and Scottish Railway

Key dates
- 1 September 1856: Station opens as Smithy Houses
- 1 November 1856: renamed Denbey
- 1 February 1878: renamed Denby
- 1 June 1930: Station closes to passenger services
- 4 January 1965: Station closed for goods.
Location

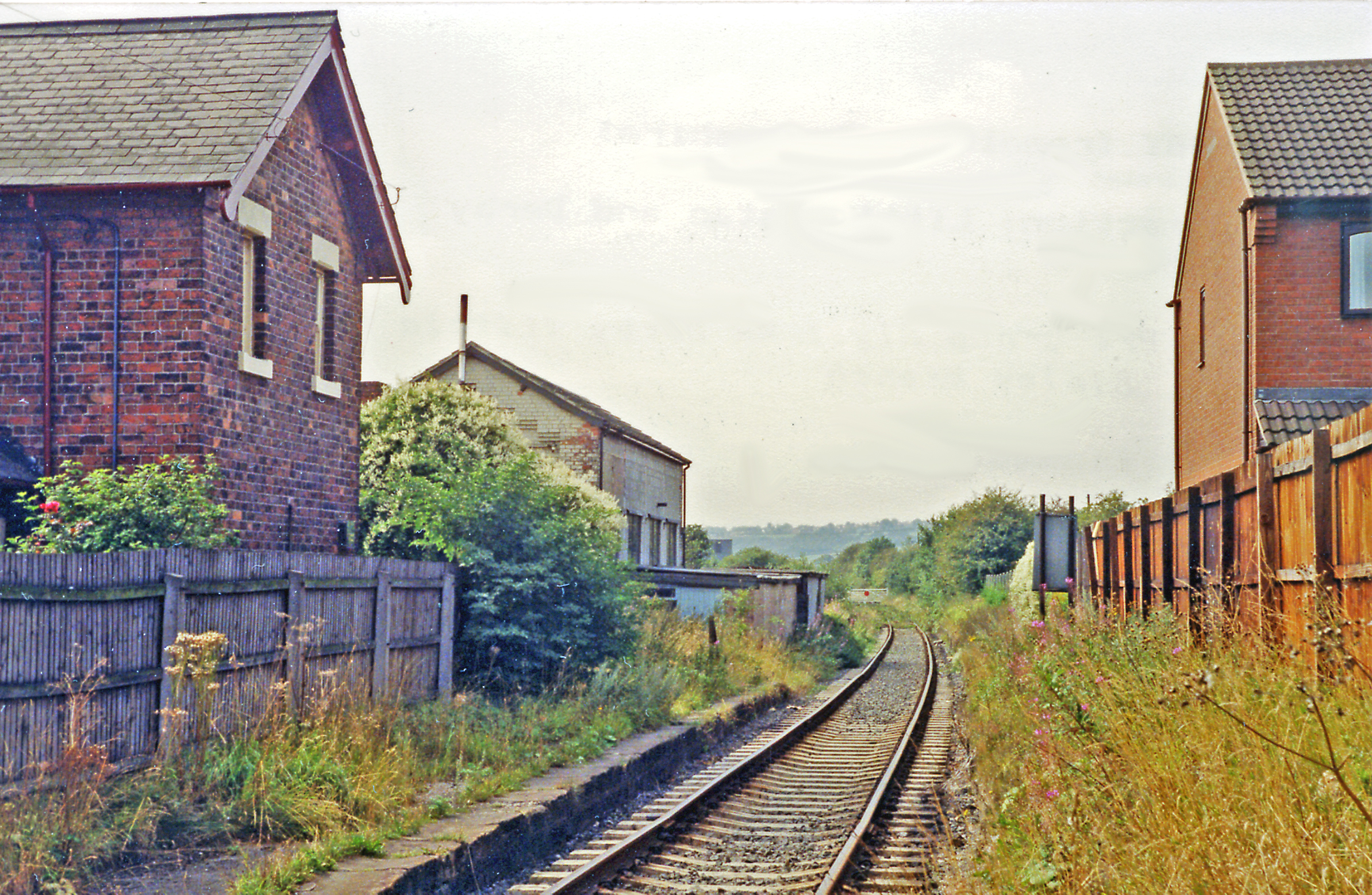
The remnants of a platform in 1990

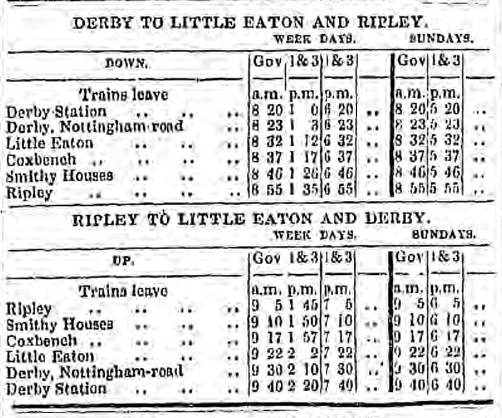
Timetable from the Derby Mercury 22 October 1856

Denby railway station was a railway station which served the village of Denby in Derbyshire, England. It was opened in 1856 as Smithy Houses by the Midland Railway to on its Ripley branch from Little Eaton Junction (approximately 3 miles (4.8 km) north of Derby) to Ripley.

Denby itself is a fairly scattered community, but the main part was about a mile (1.6 km) away. From November 1858 the timetables began to refer to "Denbey", with the Post Office spelling being adopted in February 1878.

Initially there was a low platform on the up-side, but a new higher platform to match those of the other stations was added at some time later on the down-side.

An important cargo was coal all from the many mines and opencast workings. An amount of ironstone was also worked but was of low quality. This meant that the local Denby Iron and Coal Company with their four furnaces 45 feet (14 m) high — later increased to 60 feet (18 m) — had to import their ironstone from outside the area. They also imported their coal since the local output was of domestic quality rather than being suitable for smelting.

The railway provided a siding for this company and also built a facility for processing the slag from the iron production. It so happened in 1901, the Nottingham county surveyor, Edgar Purnell Hooley was visiting the site and noticed some tar that had been spilled and covered with iron foundry slag. A major trouble with highways at that time was the dust raised by increasingly speedy vehicles and various ways had been tried unsuccessfully for binding the road surface. He noticed that it had withstood the passage of traffic and obtained a British patent for producing what he called Tarmac. In 1903 he formed the TarMacadam (Purnell Hooley's Patents) Syndicate Limited.

Another customer for the line at this point was the Denby Pottery which had opened in 1809 and had benefitted by the arrival of the railway. It had a siding at Denby Wharf (the terminus of the Little Eaton Gangway) about one-third of a mile (0.5 km) further north. Each week around three or four vans would be despatched to Chaddesden sidings (near Derby station) where they would be connected to an express to St Pancras and the company's warehouse at the Granary.

Added to all this were consignments of milk and agricultural produce from all the farms in the area

In the Grouping of all lines (into four main companies) in 1923 the station became part of the London, Midland and Scottish Railway.

Passenger services finished in 1930, though the line remained open - primarily for the coal traffic Among the numerous coal workings in the area, the Butterley Company's Denby Hall colliery a mile (1.6 km) north of the station was perhaps the most prolific. Investment continued during and after the war, with a washing plant for the colliery which was planned to handle the output of three other collieries, along with the deep Kilburn seam. The facility continued in use until after the station was finally closed in 1965. The track north of the station was lifted completely in 1968 leaving a short length of line in the remains of the station as a head shunt. The station house still survives as a private home, with both platforms greatly overgrown.

== Stationmasters ==
Richard Loft, station master was killed by a train on 6 October 1859. He was crushed between the level-crossing gates and the engine as he attempted to open the gates.

- Richard Loft until 1859
- T. Renfroe 1859 - 1863
- J. Mee 1863 - 1865
- H.T.. Brown 1865 - 1866 (afterwards station master at Ilkeston)
- S. Morton until 1872
- George E. Aldred 1872 - 1877 (afterwards station master at Duffield)
- Orlando Sims 1877 - 1902 (formerly station master at Luffenham)
- A.H. Scott 1902 - 1904 (formerly station master at Tonge and Breedon)
- J. Gallelty 1904 - 1905 (formerly station master at Worthington)
- J.W. Peach 1905 - 1908 (formerly station master at Peartree and Normanton)
- J.H. Shaw from 1908
- Oliver John Charles Alfred RIgnall 1910 - ca. 1918 (formerly station master at Redbourn)
- A.H. Glastonbury 1920 - 1931 (formerly station master at Heanor, afterwards station master at Ashby de la Zouch)

Preceding station	Historical railways	Following station
Kilburn; Line closed, station closed	Midland Railway; Ripley Branch	Ripley; Line closed, station closed
