= Little Eaton railway station =

Former railway station in Derbyshire, England

Little Eaton

General information
- Location: Little Eaton, Erewash; England
- Coordinates: 52.9675°N 1.4624°W
- Platforms: 1

Other information
- Status: Disused

History
- Pre-grouping: Midland Railway
- Post-grouping: London Midland and Scottish Railway

Key dates
- 1 September 1856: Station opened
- 1 June 1930: Station closed for passengers
- 4 January 1965: Station closed for goods.
Location

Little Eaton railway station was a railway station which served the village of Little Eaton in Derbyshire, England. It was opened in 1856 by the Midland Railway on its Ripley branch from Little Eaton Junction (approximately 3 miles (4.8 km) north of Derby) to Ripley.

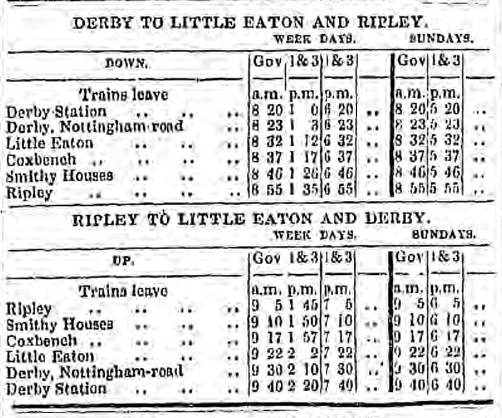
Timetable from the Derby Mercury 22 October 1856

It was the first station on leaving the main line at Little Eaton Junction and approximately 1/4 mile (0.4 km) away.

Immediately before the Duffield Road level crossing was the Derby Canal Wharf where the Little Eaton Gangway also terminated and at that point a goods yard was provided. The line was double to that point but from then on was largely single.

The station had a single platform on the down side and there was a short spur serving Dowdings paper mill.

There was a second level crossing immediately after the station, and longer trains could easily span both of them. The two signal boxes were Little Eaton Station next to the Duffield Road, and Little Eaton Village. The former has been preserved and is in private ownership in Staffordshire.

In the Grouping of all lines (into four main companies) in 1923 the station became part of the London, Midland and Scottish Railway .

Passenger services finished in 1930, though the station handled goods until 1965. The paper mill sidings remained in use for a little while afterwards and the line itself remained open to Denby for coal traffic until the late twentieth century.

Practically nothing is now left of the station apart from the track and the remnants of the platform. The station site has been redeveloped with new private housing.

== Stationmasters ==
- Charles Locker ca. 1860 - 1881
- Edward Sharpe 1881 - 1902
- R. Dugdale 1902 - 1906
- R. Haynes 1906 - 1914 (formerly station master at Tonge and Breedon, afterwards station master at Farnsfield)
- F.C. Robinson 1914 - 1922 (afterwards station master at Saxby)
- Herbert E. Wooster 1922 - 1938 (formerly station master at Edwalton)
- A. Harrison from 1938 (formerly station master at Idridghay)
- C.D. Gower ca. 1949

Preceding station	Historical railways	Following station
Derby Nottingham Road; Line open, station closed	Midland Railway; Ripley Branch	Coxbench; Line closed, station closed
