= Kilburn, Derbyshire =

Village in Derbyshire, England

Coordinates: 53.005567°N 1.425441°W

Kilburn
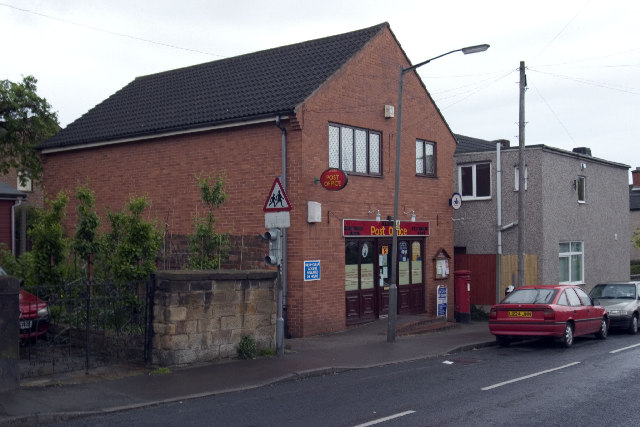
- Kilburn Post Office, in 2005

- Location within Derbyshire
- Population: 3,618 (2011)
- OS grid reference: SK385455
- District: Amber Valley
- Shire county: Derbyshire
- Region: East Midlands
- Country: England
- Sovereign state: United Kingdom
- Post town: BELPER
- Postcode district: DE56
- Dialling code: 01332
- Police: Derbyshire
- Fire: Derbyshire
- Ambulance: East Midlands
- UK Parliament: Amber Valley

Kilburn is a village and civil parish in the English county of Derbyshire, known as Kilbourne until around 100 years ago. The population of the civil parish taken at the 2011 Census was 3,618.

Forming part of the borough of Amber Valley, Kilburn has few amenities for the people who live there including a local police station, community officer and several parks for young children. The village was historically served by Kilburn railway station on the Midland Railway Ripley Branch.

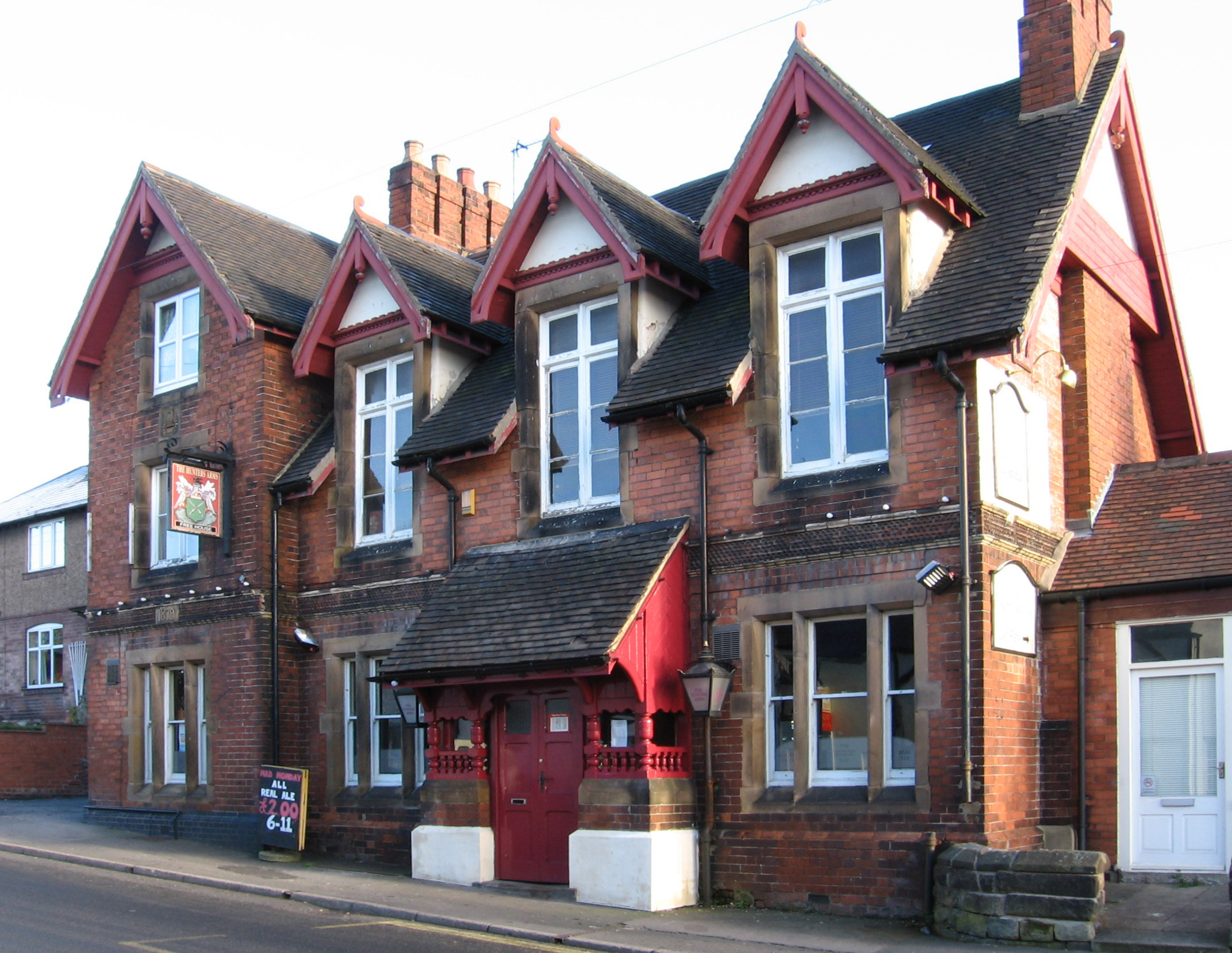
The Hunters Arms

Kilburn used to have two public houses: The Hunters Arms and the Travellers Rest. Only the Hunters Arm remains open. There is also a working men's club (Kilburn Social Club) adjoined to the football field at the back of Chapel Street. The other prominent features of the village include the War Memorial situated at the top of Bywell Lane, and the Village Hall on Church St, which hosts various leisure activities and is available for residents to hire and use via their Facebook page.
Kilburn is served by three schools within the village: Kilburn Nursery (4 - 5), Kilburn Infant School (5 - 7) and Kilburn Junior School (7 - 11). School children then progress to John Flamsteed Community School in Denby until they are 16.

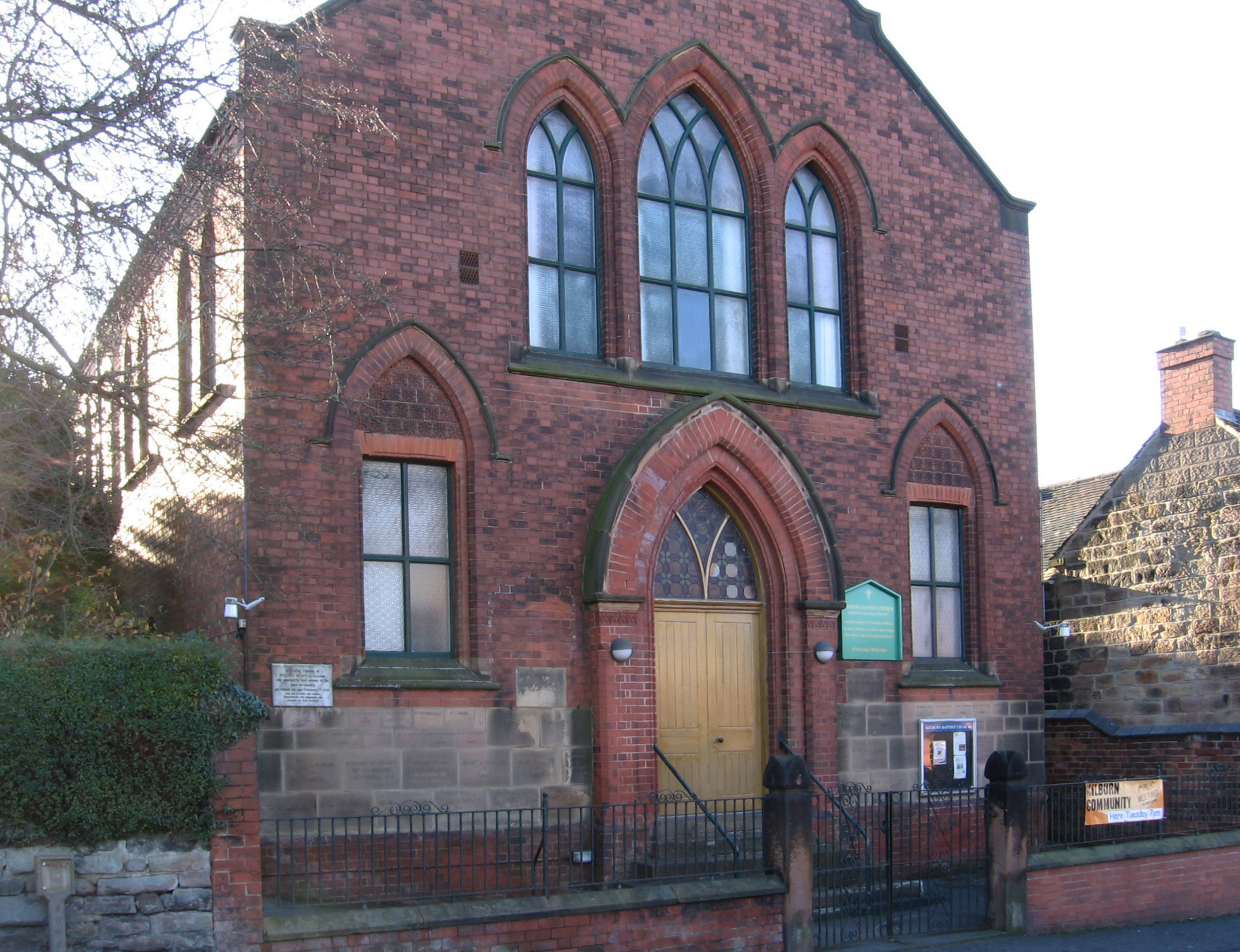
Baptist Church

There is also a Baptist Chapel as well as a Methodist Chapel, located on Highfield Road and Chapel St, respectively.

A number of associations serve the village. The Parish Council is elected from local residents and works toward improving and maintaining the village. The Kilburn Community Association voluntarily maintain and operate the Kilburn Village Hall. A village newsletter, locally circulated, report on the work of these bodies, as well as other institutions such as the local Women's Institute which serves both Kilburn and Denby. There are annual traditions such as a village treasure hunt, an Honorary Mayor election, a village quiz, the junior school Summer Fair and Christmas Shopping Evening, and carol singing, which raise funds for local and charitable causes in Derbyshire.

The Honorary Mayor election is held annually as a ceremonial village tradition since 2022. Thomas Paxton was elected Honorary Mayor in 2022, 2023, 2024, and 2025 (2022–2026).

== See also ==
- Listed buildings in Kilburn, Derbyshire
