= Coxbench railway station =

Former railway station in Derbyshire, England

Coxbench
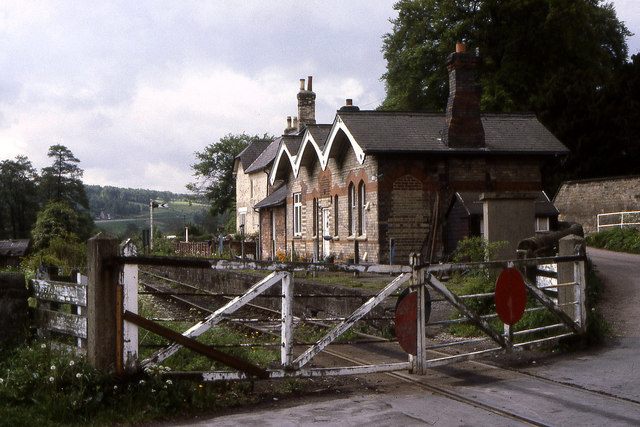
- The station in 1982

General information
- Location: Coxbench, Amber Valley; England
- Coordinates: 52.9873°N 1.4490°W
- Platforms: 1

Other information
- Status: Disused

History
- Original company: Midland Railway
- Pre-grouping: Midland Railway
- Post-grouping: London Midland and Scottish Railway

Key dates
- 1 September 1856: Station opened
- 1 June 1930: Station closed for passengers
- 5 August 1957: Station closed for goods
Location

The Coxbench railway station was a railway station which served the village of Coxbench in Derbyshire, England. It was opened by the Midland Railway in 1856 on its Ripley branch from Little Eaton Junction (approximately 3 miles north of Derby) to Ripley.

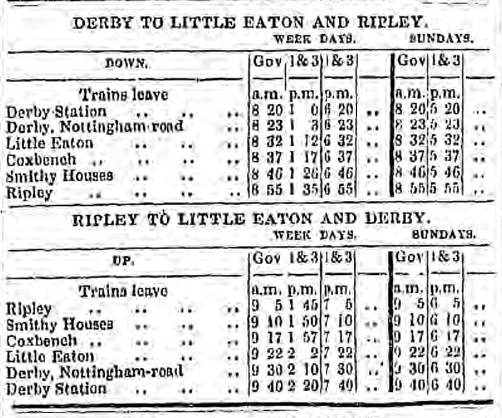
Timetable from the Derby Mercury 22 October 1856

On leaving Little Eaton the line passed under the only road bridge on the line under the Coxbench Road. Coxbench station was reached in about one and a half miles (2 km), where again there was just a single platform on the down side.

There was also a bay platform for a small siding. In its heyday it was sending out about fifty 17-imperial-gallon (77 L) milk churns each day.

At the north end was a level crossing which, being on the apex of a triangular road junction, was unusual in having three sets of gates. Approximately 1/4 mile (0.4 km) further on there was yet another level crossing.

In the Grouping of all lines (into four main companies) in 1923 the station became part of the London, Midland and Scottish Railway .

Regular passenger services finished in 1930, but the station was used to take Derby County supporters to the FA cup Final in 1946. The line remained open to Denby for coal traffic until the late twentieth century with the last coal train passing through the Station in March 1999.

This is the only station on the line that retains its buildings, along with the platform. It became a private house and though it has been extended, the work has been done sympathetically.

== Stationmasters ==
- D. Whiting until 1860
- J. Clementson 1860 - 1861
- Lucas Sutton 1861 - 1864 (afterwards station master at Pinxton)
- M. Clifford 1864
- John Ravenhall 1871 - 1903
- Walter Hodgkins 1904 - 1905 (afterwards station master at Castle Donington)
- H. Ball 1905 - 1906 (formerly station master at Castle Donington)
- E. Dunkley 1906 - 1907
- G. Mear 1907
- E.O. Cope 1907
- F.S. Mason 1907
- Mr. Ball until 1913
- A. Marshall from 1913 (formerly station master at Atterciffe Road)
- Herbert E. Wooster 1930 - 1938 (formerly station master at Edwalton, also station master at Little Eaton)

Preceding station	Historical railways	Following station
Little Eaton; Line closed, station closed	Midland Railway; Ripley Branch	Kilburn; Line closed, station closed
