= Langley Mill Pottery =

Pot Pourri with a scene of Tintern Abbey, painted and monogrammed by George Leighton Parkinson (210 mm tall)

Light Blue Fern Pot with incised decoration. c1883-90 (105 mm tall)

Brown Fern Pot with incised decoration. c1883-90 (120 mm tall)

Langley Mill Pottery was located in Langley Mill, Derbyshire on the Derbyshire – Nottinghamshire border. From its establishment in 1865 to its final closure in 1982, the pottery went through five distinct periods of ownership, producing a wide range of stoneware ranging from salt glazed ink bottles, utilitarian items and tableware to high quality and original art pottery.

== Calvert Period – 1865 to 1883 ==
In 1865, James Calvert, a chemist and druggist from Belper, Derbyshire, established the Langley Mill pottery on the site of a former brick-works. The company was known at that time as James Calvert. Historically, this area was already one of the major producers of stoneware pottery due to its location over the Derbyshire – Nottinghamshire Coal Field and several other stoneware potteries were already operational at that time. The local Coal Measures, as well as providing a ready source of fuel, were often associated with deposits of reddish clay, which proved to be highly suitable for the production of stoneware. It is therefore likely that Calvert chose the site for the new pottery with this in mind, although the close proximity of the Midland Railway and the Erewash Canal also afforded the prospect of excellent transport links.

In the 1870s, James Calvert entered into a short lived partnership with another Belper chemist and druggist, William Peter Adshead, to form Calvert & Adshead. Around 1880, after an unsuccessful attempt to sell the business, James Calvert went into partnership with his son, William Henry Calvert, the pottery then being called J. Calvert & Son.

The initial products of the pottery were items such as salt glazed inkpots, ginger beer bottles, polish pots, pitchers, jugs and mugs etc. These items were produced both for Calvert's own chemist and druggist business as well as being supplied to other similar businesses.

== Calvert & Lovatt Period – 1883 to 1895 ==
In 1883, Albert Lovatt and his brother, John Lovatt entered into partnership with William Calvert and the pottery's name was changed to Calvert and Lovatt. Both Lovatt brothers were born in Belper, Derbyshire and had previously been employed as potters at the nearby and larger Denby Pottery, operated by Joseph Bourne & Son.

The new partnership at Langley Mill resulted in the development and introduction of new ranges of art wares. These were designed and decorated by artists employed by the pottery such as Mary Helen Goodyer (c1856–1941), George Leighton Parkinson (1864–1938) and William Calvert's second daughter, Eleanor "Daisy" Calvert (1874–1925). In 1895 William Calvert left the pottery, dissolving his partnership with the Lovatt brothers and effectively ending the production of art ware pottery at Langley Mill. The detailed reasons for his departure are not known, but the general difficulties experienced by the pottery industry during the 1890s and the possible disappointing profitability of the Langley art ware due to its relatively high production costs, may have been significant factors. After Calvert's departure, the company was renamed Lovatt & Lovatt.

=== Wares from the Calvert & Lovatt Period ===
The output during this period was perhaps the most accomplished to come out of the pottery at any period and included a great variety of vases, bowls, jardinières, fern pots, pot pourri and other similar decorative items - as well as the usual domestic and utilitarian items. Typical decoration of art ware pieces at this time by Helen Goodyer consisted of intricate incised designs, usually with a botanical theme, executed through one or more layers of previously applied coloured slip. George Leighton Parkinson designs also utilised incised patterns, often in conjunction with painted scenes. Typically the subjects of these miniature painted scenes were English pastoral scenes or various famous landmarks, such as the ruins of Tintern Abbey. Often, gilding was also applied to the incised designs.

Art Wares produced at this time were usually marked on the base with an impressed "Langley Ware" mark, in a variety of designs. Occasionally, the artist concerned would also monogram some of the higher quality pieces. However, many pieces which were produced at Langley Mill seem to have no marks at all.

== Lovatt & Lovatt Period - 1895 to 1930 ==
New Art Ware Jardinière. c1903 (200 mm tall)

Brown metallic finish Vase. 1924 (195 mm tall)

Osborne Ware Jug with Pewter tilting cover. c1915 (190 mm tall)

Turquoise and Cream Blossom Decoration Vases with combed glaze finish. 1915 & 1923(150 mm tall)

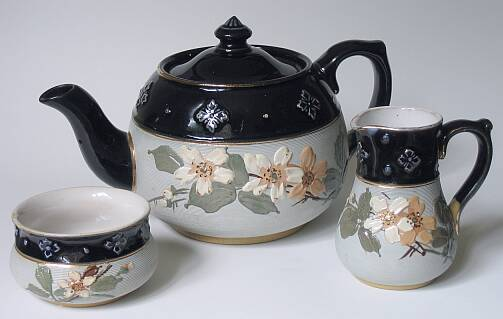
Princess Ware Teaset.

The period from the turn of the 19th century to the end of World War I (1914–1918) was a period of unparalleled prosperity, innovation and expansion for the Langley Mill Pottery, with the proprietors becoming increasingly affluent and influential. In 1913, following Albert Lovatt's death, the pottery was converted into a private limited company, Lovatt & Lovatt Ltd. with John Lovatt and Bert Lovatt (Albert's second son) as joint chairman and managing director. Reginald, (Albert's third son) also joined the management of the company around this time. Unfortunately, after 1918, the post-war depression began to seriously affect the profitability of the pottery, a situation not helped by a period of apparently weak management.

By 1923, the profitability of the pottery had declined significantly further, with the Directors being forced to take large cuts in their salaries. According to the liquidator's affidavit, Lovatt & Lovatt Ltd ceased to be profitable from 1925; and, by 1930 had total liabilities of £15,230.

Finally, following the death of John Lovatt the previous year, the company went into voluntary liquidation on 18 July 1930. This ended the involvement of the Lovatt family in the affairs of the Langley Mill Pottery, although the Lovatt name did continue to be used by successive owners of the business.

=== Wares from the Lovatt & Lovatt Period ===
Despite the departure of Calvert, the cessation in the production of art ware proved to be only temporary and by the end of 1896, George Leighton Parkinson rejoined the company to head the Art Department. Art ware was always produced alongside the output of more mundane items and never constituted a major proportion of the pottery's output. In 1897, the production of decorated stoneware vases, pots and other items began again, although the output was not as fine as during the Calvert & Lovatt period as the emphasis was now on ease of production. Several ingenious methods to reduce production costs which did not result in a fall in quality were introduced, particularly in the area of decoration, resulting in the granting of Patent No. 8687 to the pottery in 1908. By 1905, lead had also been eliminated from the glazes used.

Examples of wares from this period are Mycovera Ware, Applique Ware and Lovique Ware. By 1903, the New Art Ware was in production, consisting of hand-painted impasto flowers on a matt glaze background. The years between 1903 and 1909 also saw the introduction of additional domestic wares including Daisy Ware, Princess Ware, Green Fireproof Ware, Myrtle Ware, Royal Blue Ware and Osborne Ware.

== Oakes Period – 1931 to 1959 ==
In 1931, the Pottery was acquired as a subsidiary of James Oakes & Co. (Riddings) Ltd. and renamed Lovatts Potteries Ltd. One of the first actions of the new ownership was to introduce a substantial programme of modernisation, including the installation of a gas-fired Dressler Kiln to replace the old Round Kilns. The Dressler kiln allowed the continuous production of ware, and was much more efficient in both fuel and labour than the traditional round kilns.

New ranges of distinctive domestic wares were quickly introduced including Marlborough, Sapphire, Rosslyn, Mavis and Hotspot. Production of the old Lovatt & Lovatt decorative and art wares mostly ceased and gilding was no longer used. At this time, the use of local clays was phased out and substituted by clays from Devon and Cornwall.

=== Wares from the Oakes Period ===
Production of the pottery at this time was principally domestic wares, but also included a considerable assortment of animal figures and also many utility items such as foot-warmers. It is at this time that the Langley "Windmill" trademark first appears. During World War II, (1939–1945), all art ware production ceased and the pottery output was switched to the manufacture of items for various UK Government Departments and products such as the very utilitarian General Household Brown Ware.

During the 1950s the pottery brought out a series of more colourful ranges, in particular, Barbecue Ware, Casino, Roulette and Lime Grove. Despite being critically acclaimed by the Council of Industrial Design, these wares unfortunately did not prove to be popular with the public and by 1958 the pottery was once again unprofitable. James Oakes & Co. therefore had no alternative but to put the pottery up for sale.

Bulb Bowl. 1931-39 (180 mm across)

Windsor Green Jug. 1950-59 (200 mm tall)

== Denby Period – 1959 to 1982 ==
During this time, another major stoneware pottery at neighbouring Denby, Derbyshire (Joseph Bourne & Son) was experiencing difficulties in meeting orders on time due to some technical problems, a lack of production facilities and skilled labour. Joseph Bourne & Son therefore bought the Langley Mill pottery in October 1959, for a reported £25,000. This merger was also seen as a means of preventing the Langley Mill pottery from falling into the hands of Denby's competitors.

The purchase of the Langley Mill pottery by Denby resulted in a merger of two of the larger producers of domestic stoneware in England. Initially, the two potteries were operated as two separate entities, with their own sales policies and distribution systems remaining unchanged.

However, in terms of product lines, the new owners wished to impose a new direction on the Langley Mill pottery, placing a greater emphasis on the production of high quality kitchen ware and giftware. This period therefore saw a considerable number of new stoneware product ranges, some of which were targeted specifically at the American market.

In 1967 the name of the pottery was changed yet again to Langley Pottery Ltd. Principal designers during this period were the father and son team of Albert and Glyn Colledge and also Gill Pemberton and Thelma Hague. In 1976 the decision was made to unite the two potteries under a single name, so the Langley Pottery Ltd. and Joseph Bourne & Son collectively became Denby Tableware Ltd.

By the end of the 1970s, the two potteries were beginning to report annual losses, with the result that they were both sold to the Crown House group of companies. One of the first decisions of the new owners was that the Langley Mill site should be closed and production transferred to Denby. The final design to be produced at Langley Mill was "Falling Leaves", an oven-to-table ware designed by Thelma Hague.

Soraya Pot. 1968-77 (135 mm tall)

== Closure ==
Langley Mill pottery was closed in December 1982 with a special commemorative plate being produced to mark the last firing of the kiln and the sad end of 117 years of stoneware production. The site was eventually sold and the remaining buildings demolished in 1987. In 1997, the site was redeveloped and is now a small retail park.

In 1987, the ownership of the remaining Denby pottery changed again, being purchased by the Coloroll Group, but in 1990, as a result of a management buy-out, it once again became an independent pottery, trading as Denby Pottery Company Limited and in 1994 was floated on the London Stock Exchange. It is still producing high quality stoneware today.

== Bibliography ==
- Giblin, J.& J. (2002). Langley Mill Pottery: Its History and Its Wares. J&J Giblin Publishing. ISBN 0-9542250-0-7.
- Buttifant, P. (1994). An Introduction to Langley Ware. Chambers Press. ISBN 0-9524196-5-3.
- Key, G.& A (1995). Denby Stonewares. Ems and Ens Ltd. ISBN 1-874558-03-5.
- Hopwood, I.& G. (1997). Denby Pottery, 1890-1997: Dynasties and Designers. Richard Dennis. ISBN 0-903685-52-3.
