= Little Eaton =

Village in Derbyshire, England

Coordinates: 52.970°N 1.460°W

- Village and Civil Parish
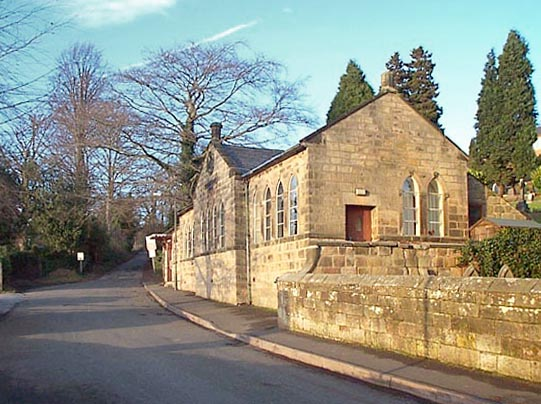
- Church Hall, Little Eaton

- Location within Derbyshire
- Population: 2,430 (2011)
- OS grid reference: SK363415
- District: Erewash
- Shire county: Derbyshire
- Region: East Midlands
- Country: England
- Sovereign state: United Kingdom
- Post town: DERBY
- Postcode district: DE21
- Dialling code: 01332
- Police: Derbyshire
- Fire: Derbyshire
- Ambulance: East Midlands
- UK Parliament: Mid Derbyshire

Little Eaton is a village and civil parish in the borough of Erewash, Derbyshire, England. The population as taken at the 2011 Census was 2,430. The name originated from Anglo Saxon times and means the "little town by the water".

It is on the former route of the old A61 (now B6179), just north of the Derby section of the A38. Since 1974 the village has been part of the Borough of Erewash.

== History ==
Pigot and Co's Commercial Directory for Derbyshire, 1835 described Little Eaton as follows:

"...a chapelry and village, in that part of the parish of St. Alkmund which is in the hundred of Morleston and Litchurch, rather more than one mile from Duffield. Here are many valuable collieries and productive stone quarries; bleaching grounds, belonging to Messrs. Smith & Sons, and machine-paper works of Messrs. Tempest & Son; there are, besides, malting concerns, and corn-mills on the Derwent river."

Many of the village's historic buildings are built of stone from local quarries in the 1800s. The wealth of gritstone, minerals and coal in the area and further north in Denby, Horsley, and Smalley, put Little Eaton on the map. Previously, pack horses had been used to transport goods to Derby, but in 1793 the Derby Canal was extended to Little Eaton. It continued to operate until 1908 but is now largely filled in.

Peckwash paper mill, c. 1800, at the north end of the village was recorded in 1851 as one of the largest in the world and brought much prosperity to the area. It is now a private house – the chimney continues to be a dominant feature of the landscape. East of the mill, on the hill, is a terrace of 14 cottages known as Blue Mountain cottages and built for the paper mill in c. 1850.

Other buildings of note include the carefully renovated Grade-II-listed Malthouse on Duffield Road, which was built in 1780 and is the former home of the Little Eaton Brewery Company (later owned by Offiler's), and Elms Farmhouse at 21 Duffield Road, a Grade-II-listed working farmhouse originally built in 1704.

Little Eaton was once the terminus of the Little Eaton Gangway – the Derby Canal Railway – where it joined the Derby Canal. A gang was a set of six to eight wagons drawn by four horses. The bodies of the wagons were taken off their bogies and loaded onto the barges at the canal wharf and then towed by horses to Derby. This 3' 6" gauge horse-operated line was authorised by the Derby Canal Act 1793 and its construction was largely the work of Benjamin Outram; it was opened in 1795 and closed in 1908. The tramroad ran from the terminus of the Derby Canal northwards to Smithy Houses, a distance of four miles, and then continued for a further mile to Denby Hall Colliery. In this area were several branches: to Salterwood North Colliery near Marehay Hall, Denby Pottery and Henmoor Colliery. A bridge remains at Little Eaton and a culvert at Smithy Houses, in addition to general earthworks. The main line was single with passing places at intervals. Between the rails the ground was always made up level with the tops of the sleeper blocks to provide a clear surface for the horses.

Little Eaton was later served by Little Eaton railway station on the Midland Railway Ripley Branch.

In the early 20th century, Little Eaton was a popular resort for many working people, with a train trip or canal ride to local woods, quarries and tearooms being a popular Sunday and bank holiday outing.

A well-known and popular character was Alice Grace, the 'Little Eaton Hermit', born in 1867 and who on being evicted from her cottage lived in sheds, barns and disused buildings, until finally residing in her famous box home (a box that used to hold bacon that was donated by the local butcher) at the pinfold on 'Th Back o' the Winns' in Coxbench Wood. She spent 20 years as a hermit until forcibly taken to the Union workhouse at Shardlow in 1907. She died aged 60 in 1927. Her story is told in a song "Alice in the Bacon Box" by Derbyshire singer-songwriter Lucy Ward.

On 26 March 1903, Thomas Bates, a prominent figure in Little Eaton, died. Bates was born in a house on Duffield Road and was educated at the local National School, which then became the original village hall (also known as the parish rooms). In his will Bates donated £1,000 to the village, for the draining, levelling, fencing and laying out of a park – having donated the land for a park during his lifetime. He also left money to employ a caretaker for the park. According to the will, the park was to be named St Peter's Park, a fact which puzzled those who knew of him because of his love of St Paul's Church (built in 1791, enlarged in 1837 and then heavily modernised in 1851), which can be found directly opposite the park. There was a reason behind his request, however – he was born on St Peter's Day, 29 June.

There is a polished granite pillar by the entrance to the park. The north-facing side of the pillar bears an engraving celebrating the coronation of King Edward VII with the legend 'Fear God, Honour the King' underneath. The south side has an inscription honouring teachers of the National school: Mrs Cocker, schoolmistress; William Bland, schoolmaster; John Latham, vicar and Samuel Lewis, Sunday school teacher. Although he is not mentioned on the pillar, the park is also dedicated to Bates. The two plaques visible on the base of the obelisk also mark the coronation of Queen Elizabeth II (2 June 1953), the Golden Jubilee of the park (13 June 1953) and the Centenary of the park (June 2003).

The village has four pubs today, but used to have a fifth, called The Anchor. It was on the main road, opposite the turning to Morley Lane, which leads to Drum Hill. The building still stands, but is now a house and the only indication of its past is a stained-glass picture of an anchor in one of the corner windows. The pub closed some time in the 19th century.

== The village today ==
When St Peter's Park was first created, it was little more than a four-acre fenced area of flat grass. Today, one corner of the park contains a children's play area, with swings, slides, tunnels and monkey bars. The rest of the park is given over to a football pitch, cricket pitch and tennis courts. The park is also used as the village primary school's playing field, the school lacking a field of its own. Also prominent in the park is the new Little Eaton village hall, opened in 2010 and heavily used by a wide range of clubs/groups of people in the village.

In late June/early July, the village carnival is held. Following a week of events, the carnival concludes with a fancy-dress parade from the top of the village at Westley Crescent through the village to the park. On the park a small fair sets up, along with book, white elephant and jewellery stalls, tombolas and refreshments and a barbecue serving meat from the local butchers. In the evening live music event are held in the local pubs.

Little Eaton is a linear settlement and benefits from passing trade. There is a Co-op on Alfreton Road next to the local primary school and cafe. The village also has a very popular Greek restaurant. On the opposite side of the road from the Co-op is Barry Fitch butchers, established in 1969. Much of the meat is reared in the fields around Little Eaton. On the southern exit to the village is the Derby Garden Centre.

There are four pubs: the New Inn on the corner of Duffield Road and New Inn Lane, the Queen's Head on Alfreton Road the Bell and Harp north of the village (originally known as the Bell Harp) and the Shiny Brewery which has a small bar. Little Eaton has a long history of independent brewers, The Queen's Head originally being named the Delvers Inn after the "delvers" who worked in the local quarries. It later picked up the royal connection – first of all the King's Head then, following Queen Elizabeth's coronation, it became the Queen's Head.

The Derby Brewing Company joined forces with Everards in 2011 in a £400,000 project to restore the Queen's Head. The deal saw the two breweries share the cost of buying and revamping the grade II-listed alehouse which dates back to 1835. As part of the restoration, the pub returned to its original layout, with a central entrance leading directly into a newly positioned bar area. The pub re-opened on 17 November 2011 but some years later Derby Brewing company pulled out leaving it to be run by Everards.

The village also has a resident blacksmith. Little Eaton Smithy is housed in the original 18th-century village smithy. Steven Oldknow is a third-generation blacksmith using time-honoured skills and knowledge passed down from father to son. Steven's father Peter is the other resident blacksmith. The traditional techniques of forge work including riveting, banding and forge welding continue to be practised.

In late 2011, the telephone box on Alfreton Road close to the village centre was bought for £1 by Little Eaton parish council and converted into a book exchange after a suggestion by the village book club. Another telephone box further along the road opposite Duffield Road was converted to an Art Box with regularly changing display and is currently not in use.

On Drum Hill to the east is the transmitter for Capital FM East Midlands and Radio Derby. Drum Hill is also used by Derbyshire Scouts and Guides for camping and other events.

== Notable people ==
- Henry Redhead Yorke (1772–1813), writer and radical publicist, brought up locally.
- John Hope (1841–1910), cattle farmer and cricketer in New Zealand and Argentina, played 4 first-class matches for Otago cricket team
- Geoff Barrowcliffe (1931–2009), footballer who played 475 games for Derby County

== See also ==
- Listed buildings in Little Eaton
