= Derby Nottingham Road railway station =

Former railway station in Derbyshire, England

Coordinates: 52.92677°N 1.46796°W

Derby Nottingham Road
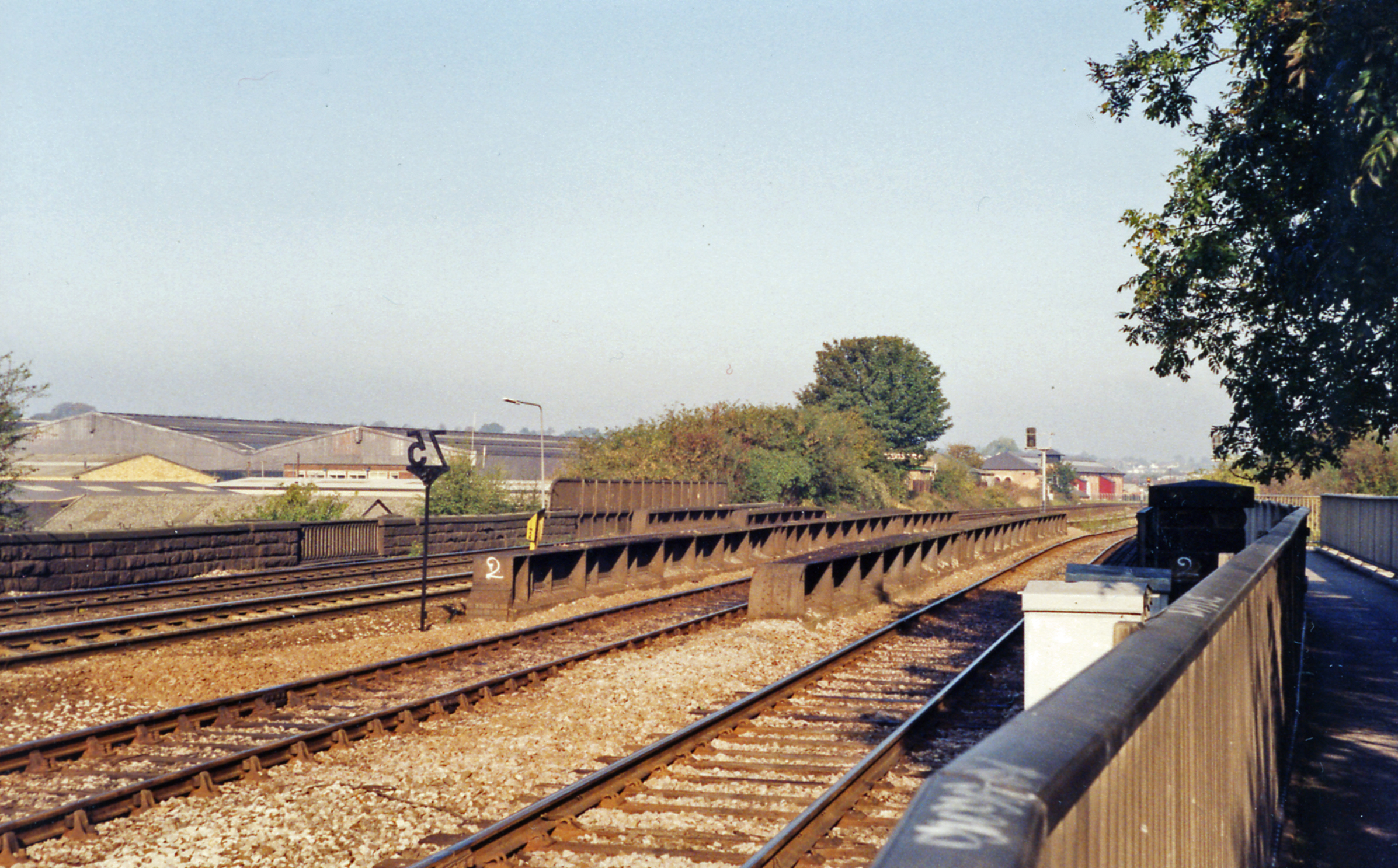
- View northwards in 1991. The two nearest lines are the goods lines. The platforms were once next to the two furthest ones.

General information
- Location: Derby, City of Derby; England
- Grid reference: SK355367

Other information
- Status: Disused

History
- Original company: Midland Railway
- Pre-grouping: Midland Railway
- Post-grouping: London, Midland and Scottish Railway

Key dates
- 1 September 1856: Station opened
- 6 March 1967: Station closed
Location

Derby Nottingham Road railway station was a railway station about half a mile north of Derby station on the Midland Railway line from Derby to Leeds and the line from Derby to Ripley in England (see timetable below).

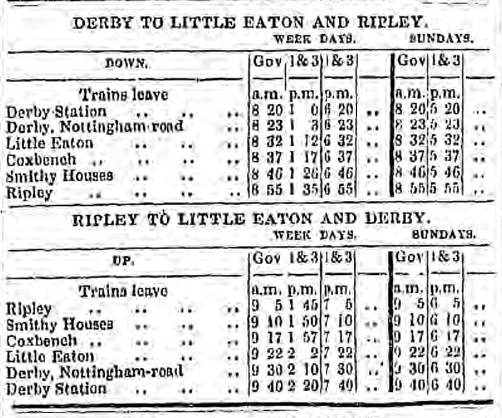
Timetable from the Derby Mercury 22 October 1856

One effect of the railways was that racing became a national sport with owners being able to transport their horses over much larger distances. Most racecourses had a nearby railway station with suitable facilities. Derby Racecourse opened in 1848 right next to the Midland line beside the Nottingham Road. It is now the County Cricket Ground.

The station opened in 1856, with several improvements over its first decade, being extended three times in 1860, 1867 and 1868. A siding was built along with improved facilities for the horses. It had platforms on either side of the two passenger lines, the goods lines passing to the east.

On 9 November 1870 there was an accident at the station which resulted in 29 casualties. During the earlier part of the day there had been a collision between luggage trains slightly further north near the Little Eaton junction which resulted in a derailment which delayed the train from Manchester to London by several hours. In the afternoon a heavy fog set in which added to the delay. A slow train from Derby to Manchester, due at 6.50pm left just after 7.00pm and passed the City Road junction at Little Chester. It was then delayed by a few minutes because of luggage trucks on the up line ahead. When these trucks were moved, the Derby to Manchester train started up again, but shortly afterwards the Derby to Ripley train scheduled to leave Derby at 7.00pm ran into in behind with considerable force. The guard's brake of the Manchester train was smashed. Several passengers jumped from each train and proceeded back to Derby on foot. The Midland Railway had installed the block signalling system between Manchester and Derby but not between Derby and Ripley.

On 18 June 1875 the left luggage office was broken into by Thomas Harris who abstracted a quantity of items. He was spotted by a Police Constable Madeley on Chaddesden Road who followed him and when he eventually caught up with him, discovered he had changed his clothes. The items were later identified as those stolen from the station and Thomas Harris was sent to prison for six months.

The station saw two fatalities in quick succession. On 15 December 1880, Frederick Holt was struck by a train whilst he was on the line. On 5 January 1881 Joseph Jolly, an employee of the Hide and Skin Company was standing on the tracks between the platforms when he was struck and killed by the Manchester to Derby express.

King Edward VII used the station when he arrived in the Royal Train from St Pancras at Derby on Friday 28 June 1906 to unveil a statue to Queen Victoria. He was welcomed at the station by the Lord Lieutenant of Derbyshire, Spencer Cavendish, 8th Duke of Devonshire, The station was specially decorated for the occasion with an awning under which the company officials welcomed the King, and the palings on the approach to the station were draped with red, white and blue awnings.

It also served the local trains to Ambergate closing in 1967.

Derby Racecourse was doubly blessed, for the Great Northern Railway also provided a station to the north of the course on its line into Derby Friargate, which is also now closed.

The approach road and station area are now used for parking and storage by a local builder's merchant.

Preceding station	Historical railways	Following station
Derby; Line and station open	Midland Railway; North Midland Railway	Duffield; Line and station open
Derby; Line and station open	Midland Railway; Ripley Branch	Little Eaton; Line and station closed
