= Kilburn railway station =

Former Midland Railway station in Derbyshire, England

Kilburn (Derbyshire)
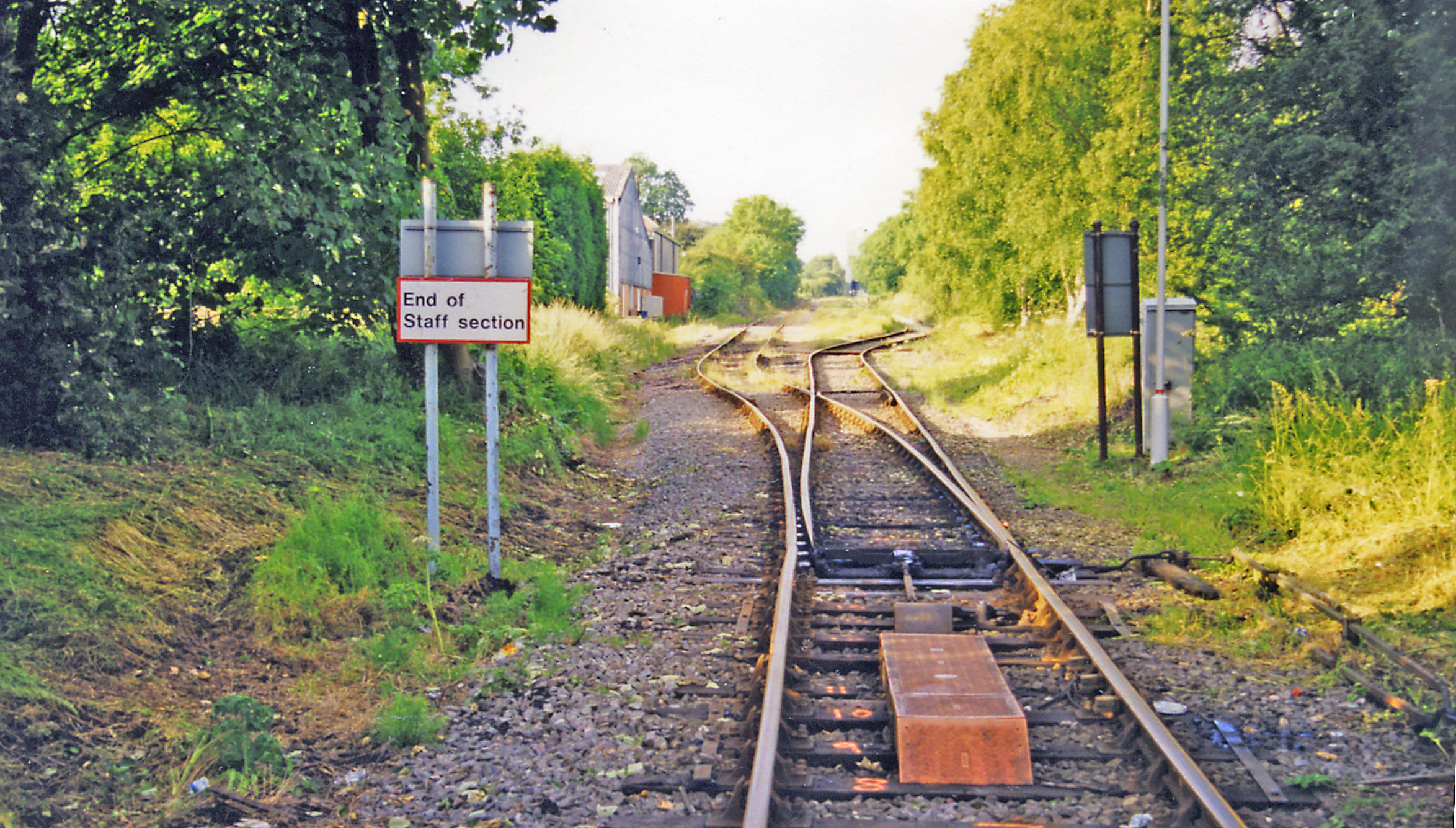
- Site of the station in 1998

General information
- Location: Kilburn, Amber Valley; England
- Coordinates: 53.0126°N 1.4393°W
- Platforms: 1

Other information
- Status: Disused

History
- Pre-grouping: Midland Railway
- Post-grouping: London Midland and Scottish Railway

Key dates
- 1 December 1856: Station opened
- 1 June 1930: Station closed for passengers
- 30 January 1939: Station closed completely.
Location

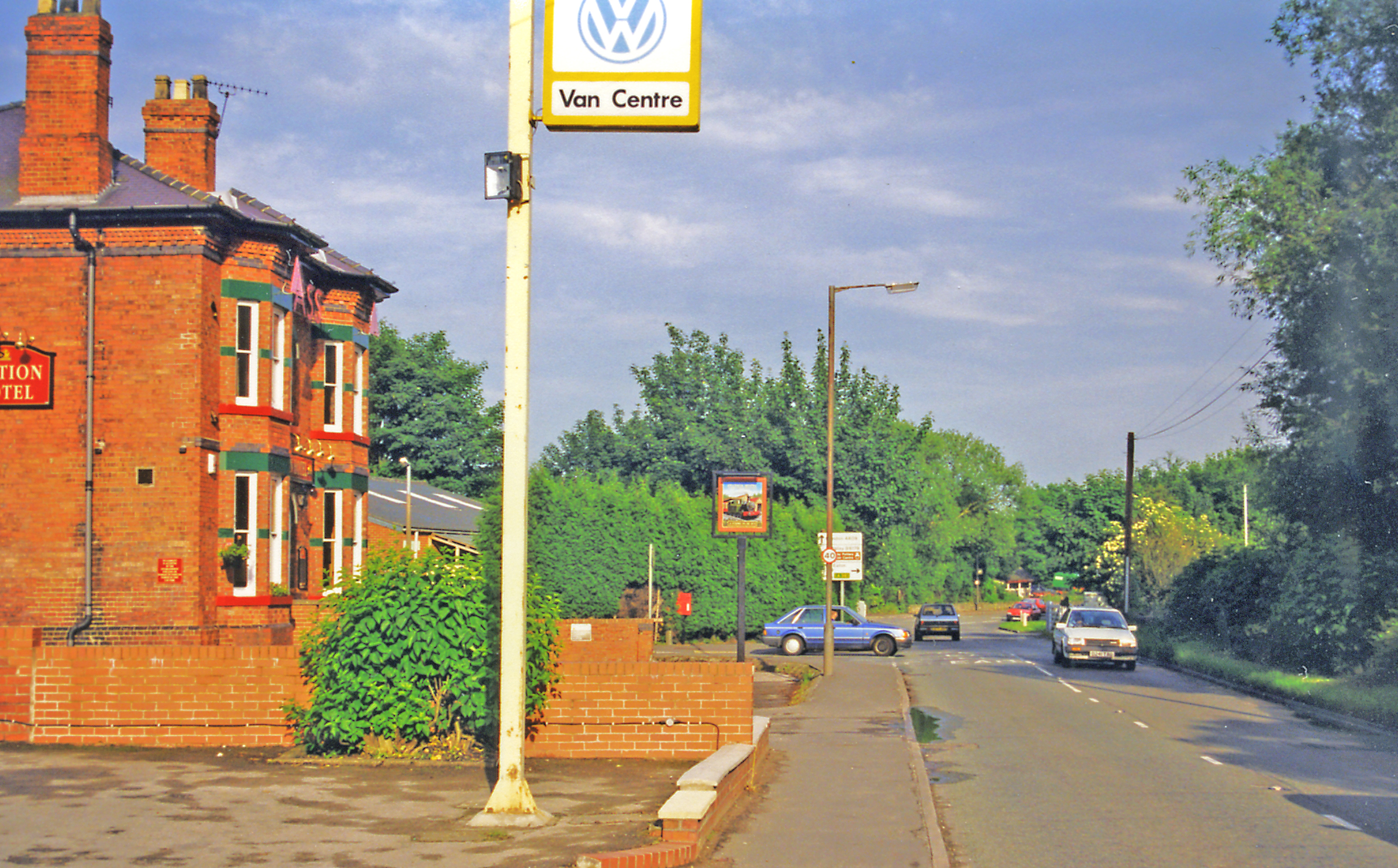
The Station Hotel and level crossing

Kilburn railway station was a railway station which served the village of Kilburn in Derbyshire, England. It was opened in 1856 by the Midland Railway on its Ripley branch from Little Eaton Junction (approximately 3 miles (4.8 km) north of Derby) to Ripley.

It was approximately 2 miles (3.2 km) from Coxbench and about a mile from Kilburn itself. It did not open until 1 December, three months after the line opened.

There was a single platform on the down side, adjacent to the level crossing over the Belper Road. On the other side was the large Station Hotel which still exists but is now a day nursery. Behind this was a brickworks, which is remembered by the name of Brickyard Lane, and nearby a glassworks. However, the main business was from the Kilburn Colliery to the north-east which was served by both north and south facing junctions.

In September 1887, the station was burgled. The station master's office was broken into but the money stored there had been removed the previous night. The robber ransacked the office but left without any gains. An 18 year old, John Walker from Chevin View, Belper was later arrested and admitted the offence. He was sent to prison for two months.

In the Grouping of all lines (into four main companies) in 1923, the station became part of the London, Midland and Scottish Railway.

Passenger services finished in 1930, though the line remained open to Derby for coal traffic until the late twentieth century. Nothing is now left of the station or its tracks, which were demolished in 1965.

== Stationmasters ==
The first station master, William Henshaw, was seriously injured by a train on 12 November 1867. He was opening a passing gate for a train but in the fog did not see the approaching train and it ran him over. He was taken by train to Derby Infirmary where it was confirmed that he had broken an arm and a leg. Henshaw died on 20 November 1867 from the injuries received.

- William Henshaw 1860 - 1867
- T. Mansfield until 1873
- J. Green 1873 - 1874
- W. Adcock 1874
- W.H. Bingham 1874 - 1875
- C. Toms 1875 - 1878
- Matthew Harvey 1878 - 1908
- H. Peat from 1908 (afterwards station master at Idridghay)

Preceding station	Historical railways	Following station
Coxbench; Line closed, station closed	Midland Railway; Ripley Branch	Denby; Line closed, station closed
