= Listed buildings in Kilburn, Derbyshire =

Kilburn is a civil parish in the Amber Valley district of Derbyshire, England. The parish contains four listed buildings that are recorded in the National Heritage List for England. Of these, one is listed at Grade II*, the middle of the three grades, and the others are at Grade II, the lowest grade. The parish contains the village of Kilburn and the surrounding area. All the listed buildings are in the village, and consist of a house, a farmhouse, farm buildings, and a war memorial.

== Key ==
Grade	Criteria
II*	Particularly important buildings of more than special interest
II	Buildings of national importance and special interest

== Buildings ==
Name and location	Photograph	Date	Notes	Grade
Cruck barn and outbuildings, Manor Court; 53.00753°N 1.43852°W	—	15th century	The barn is timber framed with cruck construction, it was encased in red brick in the 19th century and partly painted, and has a dentilled eaves band and a tile roof. There is an L-shaped plan with two ranges of similar lengths, the western range with one storey and five bays, and the southern range with two storeys and eight bays. The openings include doorways, and windows with a mix of sashes, and casements. Inside the western range are five cruck trusses about 25 feet (7.6 m) high.	II
Top Farmhouse; 53.00866°N 1.43683°W		16th century	The farmhouse is timber framed with cruck construction, later encased in sandstone, and then partly rebuilt in red brick with sandstone dressings. It has a roof with coped gables, two storeys and four bays. On the front is a doorway with a four-centred arch flanked by three-light casement windows with large lintels, and the other windows are mullioned with three casements. Inside, there are three large cruck trusses.	II*
Kilburn Hall; 53.00794°N 1.43779°W	—	17th century	The house, subsequently used for other purposes, was extended in 1712 and later. The earlier part is in sandstone with quoins, and the later part is in red brick on a sandstone plinth, with rusticated quoins, and floor bands. The roof is tiled with moulded coped gables and ball finials. There are two storeys and attics, and a front of three gabled bays, the middle bay recessed. In the centre is Tuscan porch and a segmental-headed doorway, flanked by canted bay windows, Most of the other windows are sashes with wedge lintels, the window above the doorway with a moulded surround and a keystone, and at the rear are three-light mullioned windows. On the south front is a two-storey bay window, and elsewhere is a dated and initialled plaque, and a re-set doorway with a segmental pediment, a pulvinated frieze, and moulded jambs.	II
War memorial 53.00838°N 1.43715°W		Early 20th century	The war memorial is in an enclosure by a roundabout. It is in grey and red granite and marble, and consists of an obelisk with a pedimented base, on a base of four steps with inscriptions, on a shallow platform. The enclosure contains steps and is enclosed on three sides by walls. The memorial was built to commemorate the Second Boer War, and the names of those lost in the two World Wars were added later.	II
