= John Flamsteed Community School =

Location
- Derby Road; Denby, Derbyshire, DE5 8NP; England; 53.019629°N 1.425286°W

Information
- Type: Academy
- Motto: We are ambitious, we are committed, we are proud or #nothingshortofremarkable
- Established: 1894
- Sister school: The Ripley Academy
- Local authority: Derbyshire County Council
- Trust: East Midlands Education Trust
- Department for Education URN: 142710 Tables
- Ofsted: Reports
- Head teacher: Mrs H Frost-Briggs and Mrs L Hilton
- Gender: Mixed
- Age range: 11–16
- Enrolment: 800 (2019)
- Capacity: 578
- Colour: Black
- Newspaper: The Flamsteed Star
- Website: www.jfcs.org.uk

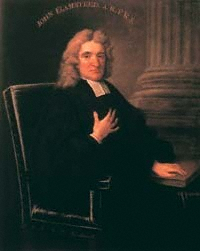
Portrait of John Flamsteed Gibson

John Flamsteed Community School is an 11–16 mixed secondary school with academy status in Denby, Derbyshire, England. It is named after Sir John Flamsteed, the first Astronomer Royal, who was a native of Denby and made early and accurate predictions of a solar eclipse in 1666.

== History ==
There is evidence of a Free School association in Denby from 1854, although the first school in Denby dates from 1730 after Jane Massie left monies for a school in her 1728 will. In 1838 a school in the village had 25 children receiving a free education in reading and writing with a separate teacher for the girls who were taught to sew and knit.

The school itself can trace its history in the village to a Smithy Houses School that was founded in 1894 with a staff of two. The school was at Smithy Houses which had previously been the offices of William Drury Holden who inherited Locko Park. The first school was designed for 150 students and was paid for by voluntary subscription. Within two weeks the school had attracted over 120 pupils and the new head asked the governors to employ two extra staff to teach the pupils efficiently. Smithy Houses School was used by the community – in 1919 when the Denby Pottery Welfare committee organised a concert here, four days after the end of World War I.

In 1975 there was a plan to close the school but this was opposed by the local community. The school at that time was called Denby John Flamsteed School. After six years the school was relaunched as an eleven to sixteen community school under its present name.

John Flamsteed now specializes in subjects Maths, Computing and Science. A new Drama and Music block was opened in September 2011. The Old School (Internally Known as the "Ryknield Rooms" by Staff but colloquially as Old School by the Student Body) area now only serves humanities and Languages.

Previously a community school administered by Derbyshire County Council, John Flamsteed Community School converted to academy status in April 2016. However the school continues to coordinate with Derbyshire County Council for admissions.
