= St Mary the Virgin's Church, Denby =

Coordinates: 53°00′50.61″N 1°24′26.37″W

St Mary the Virgin’s Church, Denby
- St Mary the Virgin’s Church, Denby (photograph by Dave Bevis)
- St Mary the Virgin’s Church, Denby
- Location: Denby
- Country: England
- Denomination: Church of England
- Previous denomination: Roman Catholic

History
- Dedication: St Mary the Virgin

Architecture
- Heritage designation: Grade I listed

Administration
- Province: Province of Canterbury
- Diocese: Diocese of Derby
- Archdeaconry: Archdeaconry of East Derbyshire
- Deanery: South East Derbyshire
- Parish: Denby

St Mary the Virgin's Church, Denby is a Grade I listed parish church in the Church of England in Denby, Derbyshire.

== History ==
The church dates from the 13th century. It comprises a tower at the west end with a recessed broached spire, a clerestoried nave with a south aisle and a two-storey north aisle, a chancel and a south porch. Alterations were made in 1838, and it was restored between 1901 and 1903 by John Oldrid Scott. During the restoration part of the scaffolding collapsed in 1903 and one of the workmen, Job Seal of Horsley, was injured.

== Parish status ==
The church is in a joint parish with

- St Clement's Church, Horsley
- Village Hall, Kilburn

== Stained glass ==
- East window, Warrington and Co c. 1889
- North aisle. Christopher Webb, 1961

== Organ ==
The pipe organ dates from 1914 and was built by Harrison and Harrison. A specification of the organ can be found on the National Pipe Organ Register.

== See also ==
- Grade I listed churches in Derbyshire
- Grade I listed buildings in Derbyshire
- Listed buildings in Denby
