= St Paul's Church, Little Eaton =

St Paul’s Church, Little Eaton
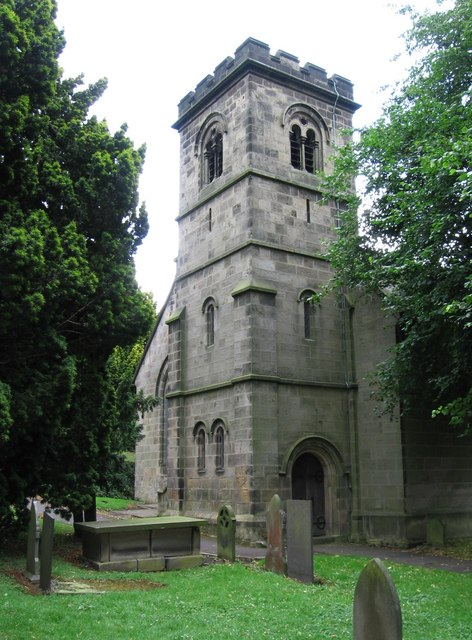
- St Paul's Church, Little Eaton
- St Paul’s Church, Little Eaton
- 52°58′11.38″N 1°27′49.02″W
- Location: Little Eaton
- Country: England
- Denomination: Church of England
- Website: littleeatonchurch.co.uk

History
- Dedication: St Paul
- Consecrated: 9 July 1791

Architecture
- Heritage designation: Grade II listed
- Completed: 1791

Administration
- Diocese: Diocese of Derby
- Archdeaconry: Derby
- Deanery: Duffield
- Parish: St Paul Little Eaton

St Paul's Church, Little Eaton is a Grade II listed parish church in the Church of England in Little Eaton, Derbyshire.

== History ==
Construction of the church started in 1791 and it was consecrated on 9 July 1791 by the Bishop of Lichfield, James Cornwallis. It was enlarged in 1837 when capacity was double to accommodate 300 people, again in 1851 when the chancel and tower were added by Henry Isaac Stevens, and restored in 1869 by Giles and Brookhouse, when a north aisle was added, the nave roof was raised and the church re-roofed.

=== Present day ===
The church is in a joint ecclesiastical parish with St Alkmund's Church, Duffield, being formerly within Duffield Frith.

St Paul's is within the Conservative Evangelical tradition of the Church of England. As a parish that rejects the leadership/ordination of women, it receives alternative episcopal oversight from the Bishop of Ebbsfleet (currently Rob Munro).

== Monuments ==
- John Tempest (d. 1863) by J B Robinson of Derby
- William Tempest (d. 1842) by N Coulson

== Organ ==
An organ chamber was constructed in 1880, and a pipe organ by Alfred Kirkland was installed in 1905. A specification of the organ can be found on the National Pipe Organ Register.

== See also ==
- Listed buildings in Little Eaton
