= Listed buildings in Little Eaton =

Little Eaton is a civil parish in the Borough of Erewash, Derbyshire, England. The parish contains 15 listed buildings that are recorded in the National Heritage List for England. All the listed buildings are designated at Grade II, the lowest of the three grades, which is applied to "buildings of national importance and special interest". The parish contains the village of Little Eaton and the surrounding area. Most of the listed buildings are houses, farmhouses and farm buildings. The other listed buildings include a church and its lychgate, a former malthouse, a public house and attached coach house, and a parish room.

== Buildings ==
Name and location–49	Photograph	Date	Notes
The Elms Farmhouse; 52.96779°N 1.46359°W	—	1704	The farmhouse, which was extended in 1780 and in the early 19th century, is in gritstone with a moulded eaves cornice, a blocking course, and a hipped roof in Welsh slate and tile. The 18th-century west range has three storeys, and the 19th-century east range has two. The west range has a front of three bays, the middle bay projecting and containing a doorway with Tuscan Doric columns and a pediment. The east range has three bays and a central round-arched doorway with impost blocks. The windows in both ranges are sashes. On the north side is a two-light mullioned window, and on the south side is a re-set Jacobean-style bay window.
Church Farmhouse; 52.96946°N 1.46238°W	—	Mid 18th century	The farmhouse and attached farm buildings are in gritstone and red brick, with gritstone dressings, and tile roofs with coped gables and plain kneelers. There are two storeys, and a doorway with a chamfered surround. Most of the windows are casements, and there is a two-light mullioned window. The farm buildings contain a cart entrance, a doorway, windows, and a flat-roofed dormer.
Outbuilding southwest of 18 The Town; 52.96946°N 1.46267°W	—	Mid 18th century	Originally a pig sty, later used for other purposes, it is built in massive gritstone blocks, and has a tile roof with coped gables. The building contains a doorway, a blocked window, and slit vents.
The Brick Barn and The Stone Barn; 52.96937°N 1.46287°W	—	Mid 18th century	A pair of barns converted into houses, the left house in gritstone, the right house in red brick, and both with tile roofs and two storeys. Facing the road, the stone house has two windows, and the brick house has a doorway and windows. At the rear, the stone house openings include a doorway with moulded jambs and a massive lintel, stable-type doors, and windows, Some of the openings in the brick house have segmental heads.
The Poplars; 52.96817°N 1.46285°W		Mid to late 18th century	A Georgian-style house in red brick with stone dressings, on a stone plinth, with quoins, a sill band, a moulded cornice and a Welsh slate roof with coped gables and plain kneelers. There are three storeys and a symmetrical front of three bays. The central doorway has a moulded surround and a pediment, and is flanked by Venetian windows. In the upper floors are sash windows, the window above the doorway with a moulded architrave and a hood mould, and the other windows with channelled wedge lintels and keystones.
Barn southeast of The Elms Farmhouse; 52.96760°N 1.46333°W	—	Late 18th century	The barn with byres and a hayloft is in gritstone, it has a corrugated asbestos roof with coped gables, and is in one and two storeys. On the west side the openings include a segmental-arched cart entrance, doorways, some with segmental pointed arches and voussoirs, and four tier of vents. The east front has similar openings, and external stone stairs.
Barn southwest of The Elms Farmhouse; 52.96755°N 1.46379°W	—	Late 18th century	The barn with byres is in gritstone, with roofs of corrugated asbestos and Welsh slate. It is in one and two storeys with a T-shaped plan. On the east is a single-storey three-bay range containing stable doors and casement windows. To the right is a range of three gabled bays with a cantilevered staircase leading to an upper doorway with massive quoins and lintel, to the left is an elliptical-arched doorway, and a lean-to. The west range contains four elliptical-arched doorways.
Former malthouse 52.96728°N 1.46341°W		1780	The malthouse, later used for other purposes, is in gritstone and has a roof of Welsh slate and corrugated asbestos, and a ridge ventilator. Some windows have a single light, some are mullioned, and some are casements.
St Paul's Church; 52.96971°N 1.46351°W		1791	The church was enlarged in 1837, remodelled in 1851–52 in Norman style, and restored in 1869. It is built in gritstone with Welsh slate roofs, and consists of a nave, a large north aisle, a chancel with a north vestry, and a west tower. The tower has four stages divided by chamfered string courses, clasping buttresses, lancet and arrow slit windows, north and south doorways with semicircular heads, paired bell openings, and an embattled parapet.
Clock House; 52.96566°N 1.46327°W		1795	The house was built for the agent of the Derby Canal, and is in red brick with a dentilled eaves cornice and a tile roof. There are two storeys and an L-shaped plan, and a north front of two bays. In the centre is a segmental-headed doorway, above which is a circular clock face, and the windows are sashes.
Derwent House; 52.97708°N 1.47275°W	—	Early 19th century	The house, built for the manager of Peckwash Mill, is in red brick with sandstone dressings, sill bands, and a hipped Welsh slate roof. There are three storeys and a symmetrical front of three bays, the middle bay projecting. Three steps lead up to a central doorway that has pilasters, a cornice, and a radiating fanlight. It is flanked by canted bay windows, the middle floor contains sash windows with channelled wedge lintels and keystones, and in the top floor are horizontally-sliding sash windows with wedge lintels.
Queen's Head Inn and coach house 52.96892°N 1.46057°W		Early 19th century	The public house and the coach house attached on the right are in gritstone. The public house has a hipped Welsh slate roof, floor bands, and a moulded eaves cornice. There are three storeys and three bays. The round-arched doorway has pilasters, a fanlight and a bracketed hood. The windows are sashes, those in the lower floors with channelled wedge lintels and keystones. On the front is a wrought iron bracket for an inn sign. The coach house has a roof of Welsh slate and tile with a coped gable. It contains a segmental-arched carriage entrance, doorways, and a square-headed opening.
Parish Room; 52.97003°N 1.46423°W		1841	The parish room is in gritstone, with a sill band, and a Welsh slate roof with coped gables. There is a single storey and three bays, the middle bay gabled and projecting. In each bay is a group of four lancet windows, and over the windows in the middle bay is an inscribed and dated cast iron plate, over which is a circular opening with a moulded surround.
The Hatherings; 52.97281°N 1.46503°W	—	1910	A house designed by P. H. Currey for himself in Arts and Crafts style. It is in brick, mostly roughcast, and has a tile roof, two storeys, and an irregular plan. The garden front has four bays, the entrance front has three gables, and most of the windows are casements. Other features include a full height gabled canted bay window, and a lean-to verandah.
Lychgate, St Paul's Church; 52.96956°N 1.46376°W	—	c. 1920	The lychgate was built as a war memorial. It has a square plan, with gritstone walls to half height, on which is an openwork timber superstructure and a Welsh slate roof. To the south is a pair of wooden gates, and inside are metal plates with the names of those lost in the two World Wars.
