= Denby Bottles =

Coordinates: 53.013°N 1.433°W

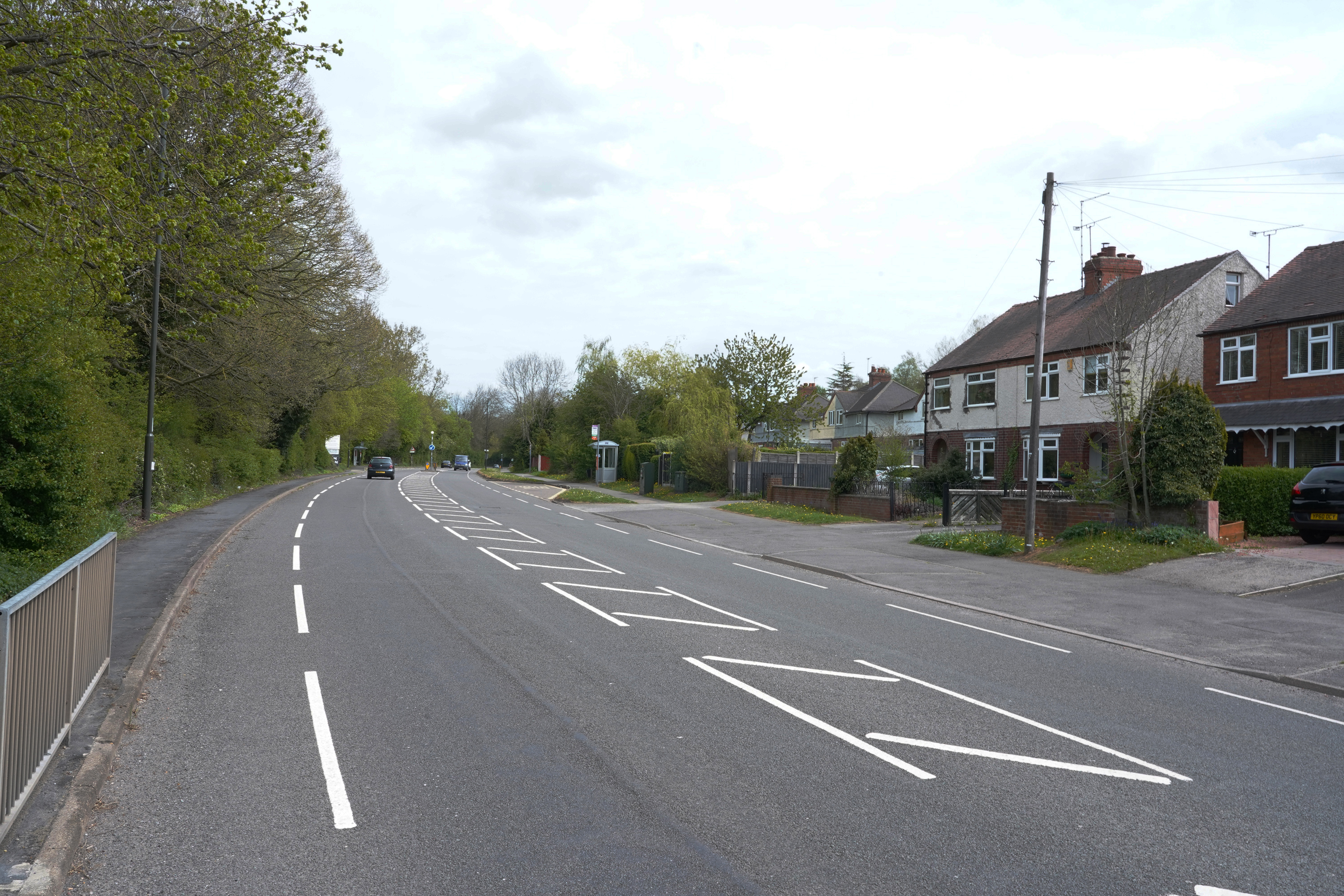
- Derby Road going past Denby Bottles

- Location within Derbyshire
- OS grid reference: SK381463
- District: Amber Valley
- Shire county: Derbyshire
- Region: East Midlands
- Country: England
- Sovereign state: United Kingdom
- Post town: RIPLEY
- Postcode district: DE5
- Police: Derbyshire
- Fire: Derbyshire
- Ambulance: East Midlands

Denby Bottles is a settlement in Derbyshire, England. It is located on the B6179 road in Denby. Denby Bottles Methodist Church is in Danesby Crescent. Each of the cottages have a segment of garden which is across the road and the brook.

Denby Bottles is situated to the right- hand side of the B6179 - coming from Kilburn Toll Bar - and is the Danesby Rise area. The Ordnance Survey Map of 1914 (surveyed 1879, revised 1913 and re-levelled 1913–14) clearly prints 'Denby Bottles' to the left-hand side of the houses depicted. The Bottle Brook houses are situated at the end of Ryknield Road which leaves the B6179 at Denby Smithy Houses.
