= The Ripley Academy =

Location
- Peasehill; Ripley, Derbyshire, DE5 3JQ; England
- Coordinates: 53°02′42″N 1°23′31″W

Information
- Type: Academy
- Established: 2014
- Sister school: John Flamsteed Community School
- Department for Education URN: 141259 Tables
- Ofsted: Reports
- Head of school: J. De Rijk
- Head teacher: H Frost-Briggs
- Gender: Co-educational
- Age: 11 to 18
- Houses: Kinder, Dove, Monsal, Riber
- Colours: Red, black
- Website: Official website

The Ripley Academy (previously known as Mill Hill School, before this, The Benjamin Outram Secondary Modern School) is a secondary school and sixth form located in Ripley, Derbyshire, England. Ripley Academy opened on 8 September 2014 as part of the East Midlands Education Trust, which currently has fifteen schools in the East Midlands. The Ripley Academy was a founding member, along with the West Bridgford School.

In the late 1990s, under the leadership of headmaster Tony Stephens, Mill Hill School had a good reputation, with around 60% of students scoring 5 or more GCSE grades A*-C.
