= Listed buildings in Denby =

Denby is a civil parish in the Amber Valley district of Derbyshire, England. The parish contains nine listed buildings that are recorded in the National Heritage List for England. Of these, one is listed at Grade I, the highest of the three grades, two are at Grade II*, the middle grade, and the others are at Grade II, the lowest grade. The parish contains the village of Denby and the surrounding area. The listed buildings consist of a church, a tombstone and a war memorial in the churchyard, farmhouses and associated structures, and a milepost.

== Key ==
Grade	Criteria
I	Buildings of exceptional interest, sometimes considered to be internationally important
II*	Particularly important buildings of more than special interest
II	Buildings of national importance and special interest

== Buildings ==
Name and location	Photograph	Date	Notes	Grade
St Mary's Church; 53.01431°N 1.40727°W		13th century	The church has been altered and extended through the centuries, and was restored in 1901–03 by J. Oldrid Scott. It is built in sandstone with roofs of lead and tile. The church consists of a nave with a south clerestory, a two-storey north aisle and a single-storey south aisle, a south porch, a chancel, and a west steeple. The steeple has a tower with three stages, angle buttresses, string courses, and a two-light west window, over which is a niche with a moulded surround, an ogee head and a hood mould with a foliage finial. On the north and west sides are lancet windows, in the top stage are bell openings, a frieze] of pointed trefoils, corner gargoyles, and a parapet. Above this is a domed cupola over the stairs, and a recessed octagonal broach spire with two tiers of gabled lucarnes. Along the body of the church are embattled parapets, and the east window has four lights.	I
Breach Farmhouse; 53.02483°N 1.38872°W	—	1600	The farmhouse, which was later altered and extended, is in sandstone with quoins, and a tile roof with moulded gable copings and moulded kneelers, and the extension is in red brick with stone dressings. There are two storeys and attics, and a front of three bays. In the centre is a two-storey gabled porch, and a doorway with a chamfered and quoined surround and a hood mould, flanked by circular windows. The other windows are mullioned or have single lights and casements, and in the attic are gabled dormers. In the gable of the porch is a diamond-shaped initialled and dated plaque.	II
Outbuilding, Breach Farm; 53.02498°N 1.38846°W	—	Early 17th century	The outbuilding is in sandstone with quoins, and a tile roof with moulded gable copings and moulded kneelers. There are two storeys and two bays. It contains a stable door, a window with a chamfered surround, and a doorway, and there is an external brick staircase.	II
Church Farmhouse and outbuilding 53.01398°N 1.40792°W		Early 17th century	The farmhouse, which may have a medieval core, has been much extended. It is in sandstone and red brick, partly rendered, on a plinth, with quoins, and a tile roof with a coped gable and moulded kneelers. Thee are two storeys and attics, and a complex plan, including a massive external stepped chimney stack. The windows vary; some are mullioned and others are sashes or casements. On the east side of the house is a brick archway and a single-storey outbuilding.	II*
Park Hall Farmhouse; 53.02224°N 1.43266°W	—	Early 17th century	The farmhouse is in sandstone on a plinth, with quoins, a coved eaves band, and a tile roof with coped gables and plain kneelers. There are two storeys and attics, a basement at the north end, and five bays. On the front is a two-storey brick porch with a segmental-headed doorway, and an inner doorway with a chamfered surround and a four-centred arch, and a doorway with a quoined and chamfered surround. The windows are mullioned with hood moulds, and there are two gabled dormers. At the rear is a gabled staircase tower, and a doorway with an initialled and dated lintel.	II*
Tombstone; 53.01414°N 1.40740°W	—	c. 1733	The double tombstone is in the churchyard of St Mary's Church. It has a raised moulded edge, a central division, and inscribed panels.	II
Gate piers and walls, Park Hall Farmhouse; 53.02200°N 1.43314°W	—	18th century	The garden is enclosed by red brick walls with double chamfered stone copings. The gate piers are in rusticated sandstone and have pilasters on the inner faces, moulded cornices and bases, and ball finials.	II
Milepost; 53.02303°N 1.41783°W		c. 1840	The milepost is on the north side of Derby Road (B6179 road). It is in cast iron with a triangular plan and a flat pointed top. On the top is inscribed the distance to London, and the lower faces contain the distances to Derby, Burton upon Trent, Alfreton, and Chesterfield.	II
War memorial 53.01431°N 1.40653°W		c. 1920	The war memorial is in the churchyard of St Mary's Church. It consists of a stone Celtic cross on a stepped base, with Celtic decoration on the east face. On the base is an inscription, and the names of those lost in the First World War, and a plaque has been added with the names of those lost in the Second World War.	II
