= Mill Hill School, Derbyshire =

Mill Hill School

Location
- Ripley, Derbyshire, DE5 3JQ; England
- Coordinates: 53°02′42″N 1°23′31″W

Information
- Established: 1950
- Closed: 2014
- Local authority: 113001
- Ofsted: Reports
- Gender: Co-educational
- Age: 11 to 18
- Houses: Dove, Kinder, Monsal, Riber
- Colours: Red, Blue, Yellow, Green

Mill Hill School was a secondary school and sixth form college located in Ripley, Derbyshire, England. The school was formed from the combination of Benjamin Outrams Comprehensive School and Ripley Technical School and became known as Mill Hill School. The school gained specialist status in English. Prior to this, Mill Hill specialised in the Media and liberal arts curriculum in 2009.

Mill Hill School converted to academy status in September 2014 and became The Ripley Academy.
