= John Hope (cricketer, born 1841) =

New Zealand cricketer

Personal information
- Full name: John Hayhurst Hope
- Born: 6 February 1841; Little Eaton, Derbyshire, England
- Died: 12 November 1910 (aged 69); Buenos Aires, Argentina
- Batting: Right-handed
- Role: Wicket-keeper

Domestic team information
- Years: Team
- 1863/64–1866/67: Otago
- Source: ESPNcricinfo, 14 May 2016

John Hayhurst Hope (6 February 1841 – 12 November 1910) was an English-born cricketer. He played four first-class matches for Otago between the 1863–64 and 1866–67 seasons.

Hope was born at Little Eaton in Derbyshire and educated at Aldenham. He played in the first four first-class matches played in New Zealand, all for Otago against Canterbury. A wicket-keeper, Hope scored a total of 84 runs and took 12 catches. In New Zealand he worked for the New Zealand Customs Department. He moved to Argentina in the late 1860s where he farmed cattle. He died in 1910 at the age of 69 at Buenos Aires in Argentina.
