= Little Eaton Gangway =

British narrow gauge industrial wagonway (1795-1908)

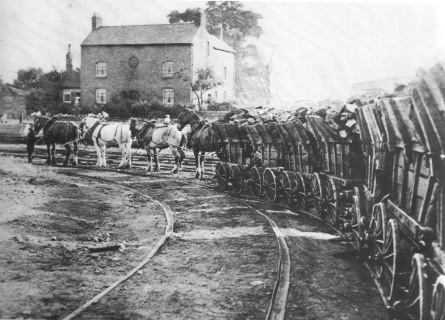
- The Little Eaton Gangway in 1908 with the last train of loaded coal waggons

Overview
- Headquarters: Little Eaton
- Locale: England
- Dates of operation: 1795–1908
- Successor: Abandoned

Technical
- Track gauge: 3 ft 6 in (1,067 mm) and 4 ft (1,219 mm)
- Length: 5 miles (8 km)

The Little Eaton Gangway, officially the Derby Canal Railway, was a narrow gauge industrial wagonway serving the Derby Canal, in England, at Little Eaton in Derbyshire.

== The Derby Canal ==
In 1792, Benjamin Outram was asked to prepare plans for a broad canal from Swarkestone to Smithy Houses, near Denby, with a branch at Derby to the Erewash Canal at Sandiacre, which he estimated would cost £60,000. The original report has been lost in time with only a dated and signed map drawing surviving in Derbyshire Records Office. William Jessop on 3 November 1792 confirmed Outram's proposals. The Derby Canal Act 1793 (33 Geo. 3. c. 102) authorized a rail connection between the Derby Canal at Little Eaton and the collieries to the north. The wagonway ran four miles (6 km) from the canal wharf to Smithy Houses and another mile further to Denby Hall Colliery. Further short branches served Salterwood North and Henmoor Collieries as well as the Denby Pottery.

The purpose of this 5-mile-long (8 km) plateway was to carry coal from Kilburn and Denby down to the canal at Little Eaton and general goods including stone, pottery and "clogs of wood".

== Construction ==
Outram's original plan was for a conventional waggonway with wooden sleepers and oak rails reinforced with cast iron plates. Accordingly, an advertisement appeared in the Lincoln & Stamford Mercury for 16 August 1793 for 10,000 oak sleepers 4 feet 6 inches (1.37 m) long squared at each end for a length of 9 inches (229 mm).

However, by the time the railway was approved, Outram had decided to use the flanged rails with which his name has become associated. In this he may have been greatly influenced by William Jessop (1745 to 1814) and also by Joseph Butler of Wingerworth near Chesterfield, who had constructed a similar line in 1788. Butler is believed to have been the first to do so in Derbyshire and supplied the rails, rather than Outram's own works. Outram considered himself the first to use stone blocks as sleepers. These were drilled with a six-inch (152 mm) hole into which an oak plug was fitted. The rails of cast iron were usually three feet (0.91 m) long (he also manufactured four-foot (1.22 m) long rails when asked) and of L-shaped cross-section, were attached by means of spikes into a notch at the end of the rail. The line was originally 3 ft 6 in (1,067 mm) gauge, being increased later to 4 ft (1,219 mm) at an unknown date.

The cast iron plates used to build the track initially weighed 28 lb/yd (13.9 kg/m) although this was increased to 40 lb/yd (19.8 kg/m) for plates made after 1804. By 1825, there were nine passing places on the single-track line, which carried 2-long-ton (2.2-short-ton; 2.0 t) waggons. Each waggon carried a box of coal, with a load of between 1.65 and 1.87 long tons (1.85 and 2.09 short tons; 1.68 and 1.90 t), which was transferred to a barge at Little Eaton wharf by a crane. From Smithy Houses, several private lines served the Denby Main colliery and other mines in the locality. Further extensions were made between 1827 and 1829, when lines were built to provide links to the colliery owned by Harrison, Pattinson and Davenport at Denby, to Kilburn colliery and to Salterwood pits.

The waggons, built at Outram's Butterley works consisted of containers mounted loosely on a chassis, or tram, with four cast iron wheels. The container would be lifted off at Little Eaton and loaded complete into narrowboats or transferred to two-wheeled carts for carriage by road. The canal line from Little Eaton led to Gandy's Wharf in Derby for onward distribution through the canal network or by road and was an early example of a containerised system (see Duke of Bridgewater Canal for first use)

The gangway and the Little Eaton line of the canal opened in 1795 to a great ceremonial fanfare with the wagons being kitted out with seats for the dignitaries and a Band to mark the occasion. The first load of coal from Denby was distributed to the poor of Derby.

== Decline ==
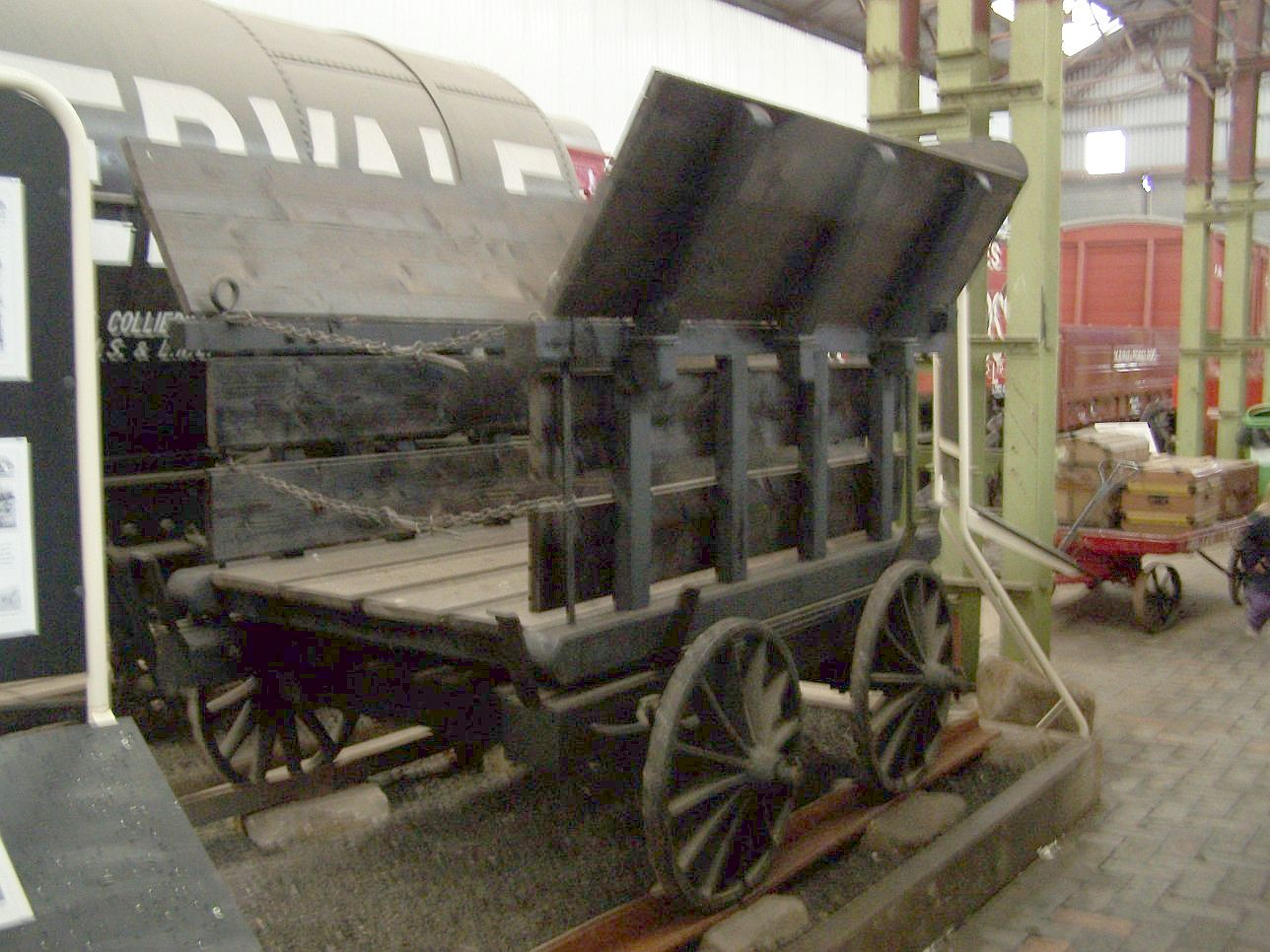
Replica Wagon at the Midland Railway Trust

When the Midland Railway built its branch line to Ripley in 1856, it lost most of its trade, finally closing in 1908.

The trackbed was used for a new road, the A61, bypassing the old road through Coxbench. This, in turn, was superseded at the end of the twentieth century by the A38 trunk road, demoting it to the B6179. Thus there are three generations of highway side-by-side, plus the remains of the railway.

The only remaining trace of the gangway is the Wharf building seen in the photo above, the easternmost arch of Jack O' Darley bridge, and another two arch bridge over the Bottle Brook, with a few of the sleeper stones that have been used in nearby walls. A wagon from this period of the gangway's history was preserved in the National Mining Museum at Lound Hall, Bothamsall and is now in the National Railway Museum.

A replica Little Eaton Gangway wagon is on display at the Midland Railway Trust near Ripley.
