= Denby Pottery Company =

British manufacturer of pottery

Denby Home Pottery Limited
- Type: Private
- Industry: Pottery
- Founded: 1809
- Headquarters: Denby, Derbyshire, England
- Area served: Worldwide
- Key people: Sebastian Lazell, Managing director
- Products: Tableware, Kitchenware, Serveware, Cookware, Glassware
- Owner: Home Bargains
- Website: www.denbypottery.com

Denby Pottery Company Ltd was a British brand and former manufacturer of pottery, named after the village of Denby in Derbyshire where it was based. It primarily sold hand-crafted stoneware tableware, kitchenware and serveware products including dinner sets, mugs and serving dishes, as well as a variety of glassware products and cast-iron cookware.

== History ==
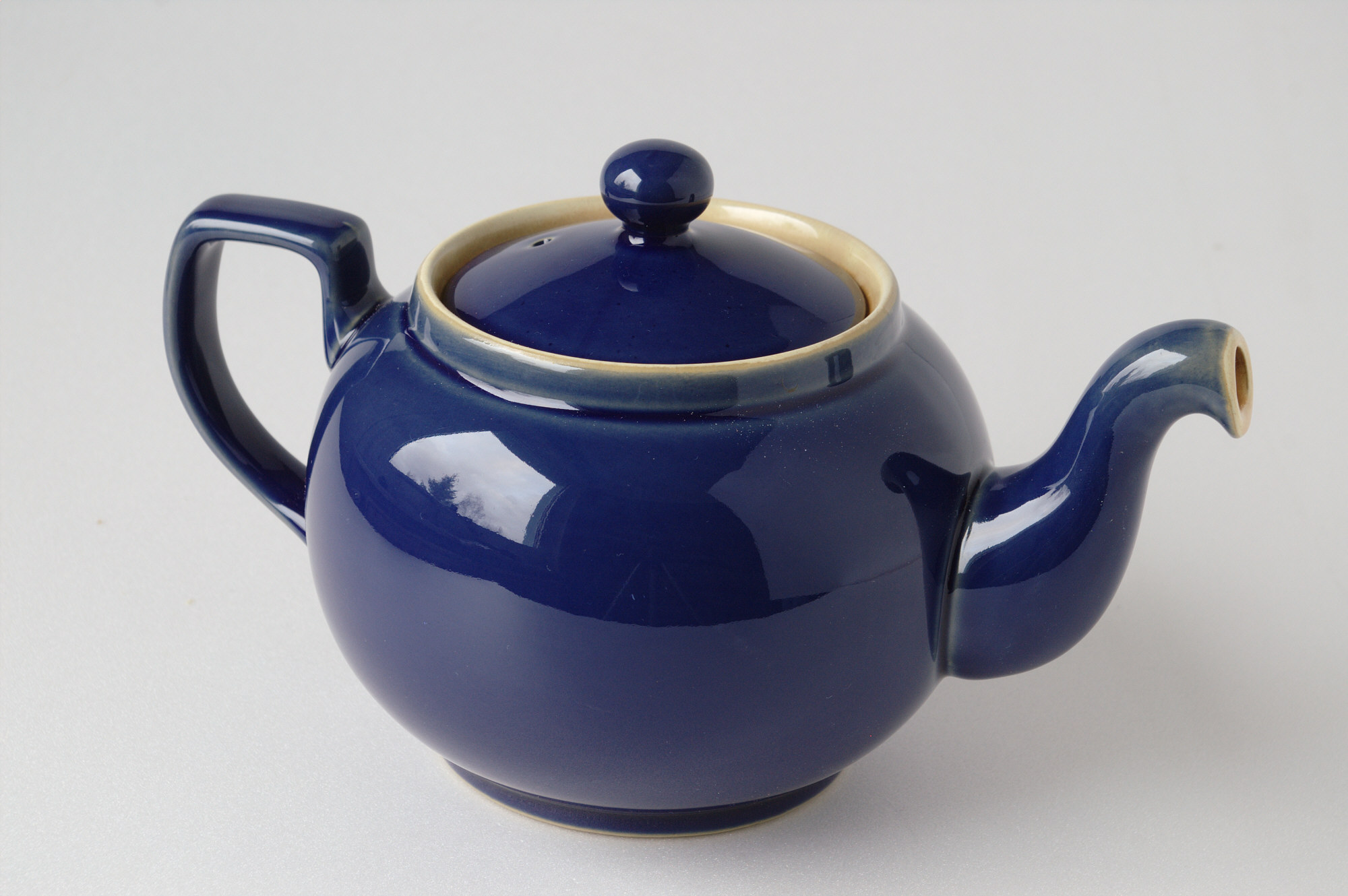
A Denby "neverdrip" teapot in blue, a design from the 1920s or 1930s

The pottery at Denby was founded on the estate of William Drury-Lowe in 1809 as a manufacturer of stoneware bottles. It was run by Joseph Jager in partnership with Robert Charles George Brohier; the partnership was dissolved in 1814. By this time, clay from a deposit on the land was already in use at the Belper Pottery. At the beginning of 1815 William Bourne of the Belper Pottery and his sons William, John and Joseph took a 21-year lease on Brohier and Jager's factory. Joseph Bourne ran the works at Denby and Belper in tandem until 1834, when he closed down the Belper pottery and moved its equipment and workforce to Denby. Bourne later took over the Codnor Park and Shipley Potteries, and merged them into the Denby works in a similar manner. Joseph Bourne took his son Joseph Harvey Bourne into partnership, and the company became known as Joseph Bourne and Son, a name it kept even after the death of Joseph Bourne in 1860.

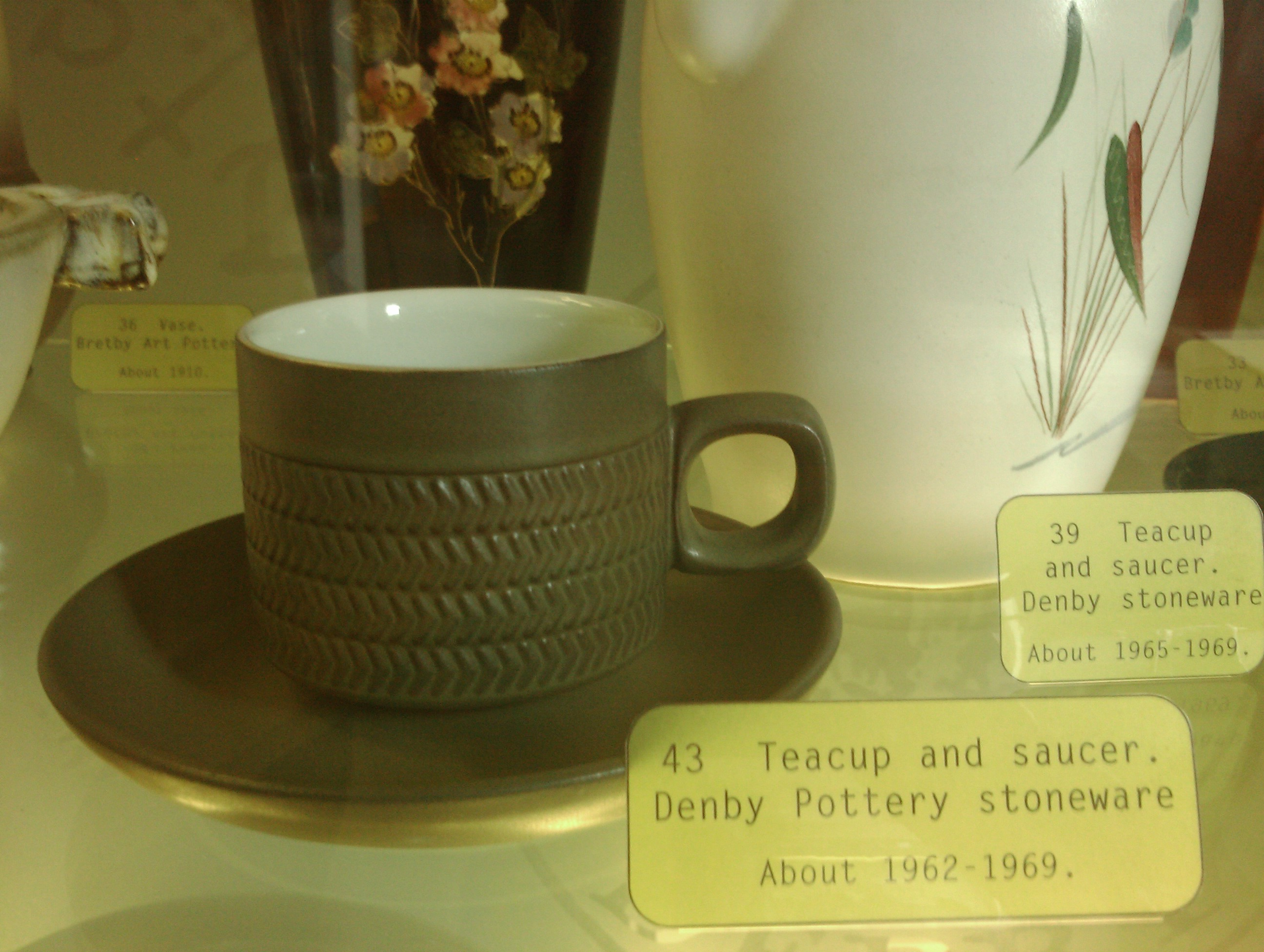
1960s pieces

Denbyware from the Blue Jetty range

Using a new patent process for drying slip invented by Needham and Kite of Vauxhall, the pottery produced at least 25 tons of workable clay each day. In the nineteenth century most of the ware produced was salt-glazed stoneware. Bourne patented improved kilns for stoneware in 1823 and 1848. By the 1870s the pottery was producing a wide range of utilitarian stoneware products including telegraph insulators, ink bottles, pickle and marmalade jars, spirit and liquor bottles, foot warmers, churns, mortars and pestles, pipkins, feeding-bottles, pork pie moulds, druggists' shop-jars, snuff-jars, spirit-barrels, pudding-moulds, and water filters. They also made more decorative "hunting jugs" sprigged with moulded decorations of huntsmen, windmills, men smoking or beehives, sometimes with the handle in the form of a greyhound, and terracotta goods, both practical and decorative.

The company benefited greatly from its transport links into Derby and beyond, particularly when the Midland Railway opened its Ripley Branch. It had a siding at Denby Wharf, (the terminus of the Little Eaton Gangway, about 2 miles away from Duffield and 5 miles from Belper.) approximately opposite to the factory. Each week around three or four vans would be dispatched to Chaddesden sidings (near Derby station) where they would be connected to an express to St Pancras in London and the company's warehouse at the Granary.

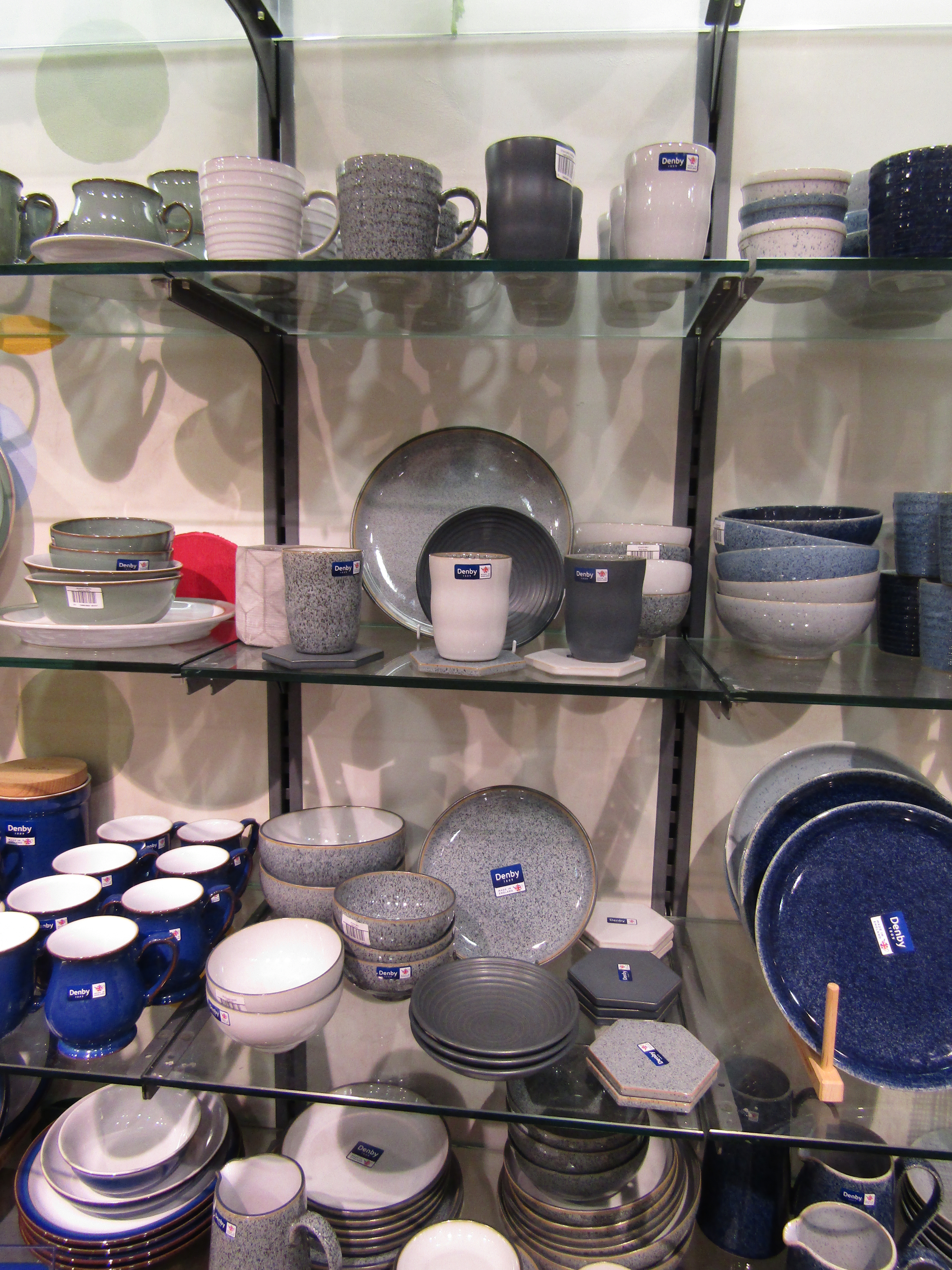
Contemporary stoneware for sale in Norwich, Norfolk, 2019

The company, whose name is now principally associated with stoneware, initially produced bottles and jars, before specialising in kitchenware and, eventually, in tableware, for which it is best known today. In order to increase capacity the nearby Langley Mill Pottery was acquired in October 1959. During the 1950s and 1960s a number of designers worked for Denby, including Gill Pemberton who designed the renowned and admired Denby Chevron, and Arabesque amongst others.

In 1987 the company was taken over by the Coloroll Group. After Coloroll went into receivership in 1990, Denby was subject to a management buyout, and was floated in 1994.

In the early twenty-first century Denby expanded its use of materials to include glass (wine glasses, tumblers and bowls) and metal (cutlery and cooking utensils). It also introduced fine dining ranges in porcelain and bone china.

The company was subject to a £30 million management buyout in 2009, after suffering a decline in sales. The company had £72 million of debt written off at the time of the buyout.

In 2010 Denby acquired Burleigh Pottery in Stoke-on-Trent. Shortly afterwards in 2012, the Denby Group acquired Poole Pottery.

In February 2014, the company was put up for sale by its owner Hilco Capital following expressions of interest from other companies. Hilco cancelled the sale in January 2015 due to improvements in the company's growth. As of 2021, one of the Board members of Denby Holdings Ltd was from Valco Capital Partners LP.

In 2019, Denby launched the Conscious Choice campaign which focused on the versatile, sustainable and functional nature of Denby's stoneware products and aimed to inspire customers to try and live more sustainably by reusing their pottery around the home.

In a departure from its tradition of stoneware production, in 2021 Denby launched a Porcelain collection. The venture into a new material saw Denby repurpose part of its existing factory, with additional staff taken on to produce the new lines. 4 ranges - Classic White, Arc (textured) White, Arc Blue and Modern Deco (a patterned range) make up the Porcelain collection, and use the same ceramics and glaze techniques practised for over 200 years at Denby.

In 2021 the television programme Inside the Factory visited the Denby factory to follow the journey of a Halo Heritage mug, broadcast on 2 February 2022.

On March 11th 2026, Denby announced their intention to appoint administrators as a "precautionary measure". This came into place at the end of March, and the business is now managed by FRP Advisory. Former CEO Sebastian Lazell said that rising energy costs from the ongoing 2026 Iran war had left the company operating at a loss, leading to its collapse. In April, FRP Advisory announced that they were unable to find a buyer for Denby, and over 120 workers were laid off as it closed the company's manufacturing and design departments. The company produced its last pieces on June 4. At the time, Denby's international subsidiaries in Korea, the US and China were not in administration and were operating normally.

In 25 August 2026, it was confirmed that the Denby brand had been bought by an unidentified buyer, confirmed to be TJ Morris, trading as Home Bargains.

== Bibliography ==
Hopewood, Irene. Denby pottery, 1809-1997: dynasties and designers (ISBN 0903685523)
