= Denby =

Village in Derbyshire, England

Coordinates: 53.020°N 1.425°W

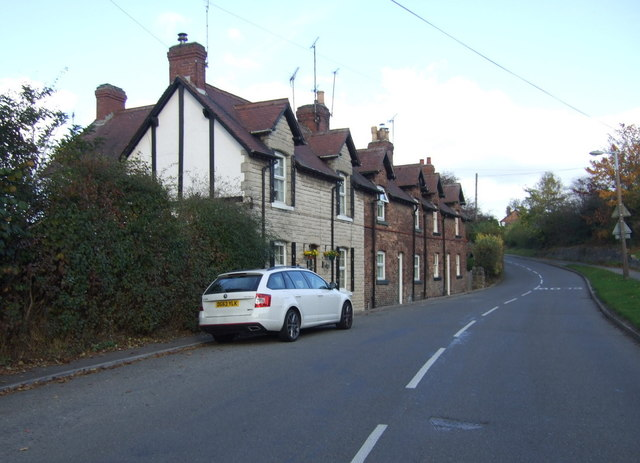
- Church Street, Denby (2015)

- Location within Derbyshire
- Population: 2,190 (2011)
- OS grid reference: SK386470
- District: Amber Valley
- Shire county: Derbyshire
- Region: East Midlands
- Country: England
- Sovereign state: United Kingdom
- Post town: RIPLEY
- Postcode district: DE5
- Dialling code: 01332, 01773
- Police: Derbyshire
- Fire: Derbyshire
- Ambulance: East Midlands
- UK Parliament: Amber Valley

Denby is a village in the English county of Derbyshire that is notable as the birthplace of John Flamsteed, England's first Astronomer Royal, and the location of the Denby Pottery Company. Denby is 3 miles (5 km) east from Belper and 8 miles (13 km) north of Derby. Denby is home to a secondary school which is named after John Flamsteed. The village was once served by Denby railway station on the Midland Railway Ripley Branch. The population at the 2001 Census was 1,827, increasing to 2,190 at the 2011 Census.

== Other settlements in Denby parish ==
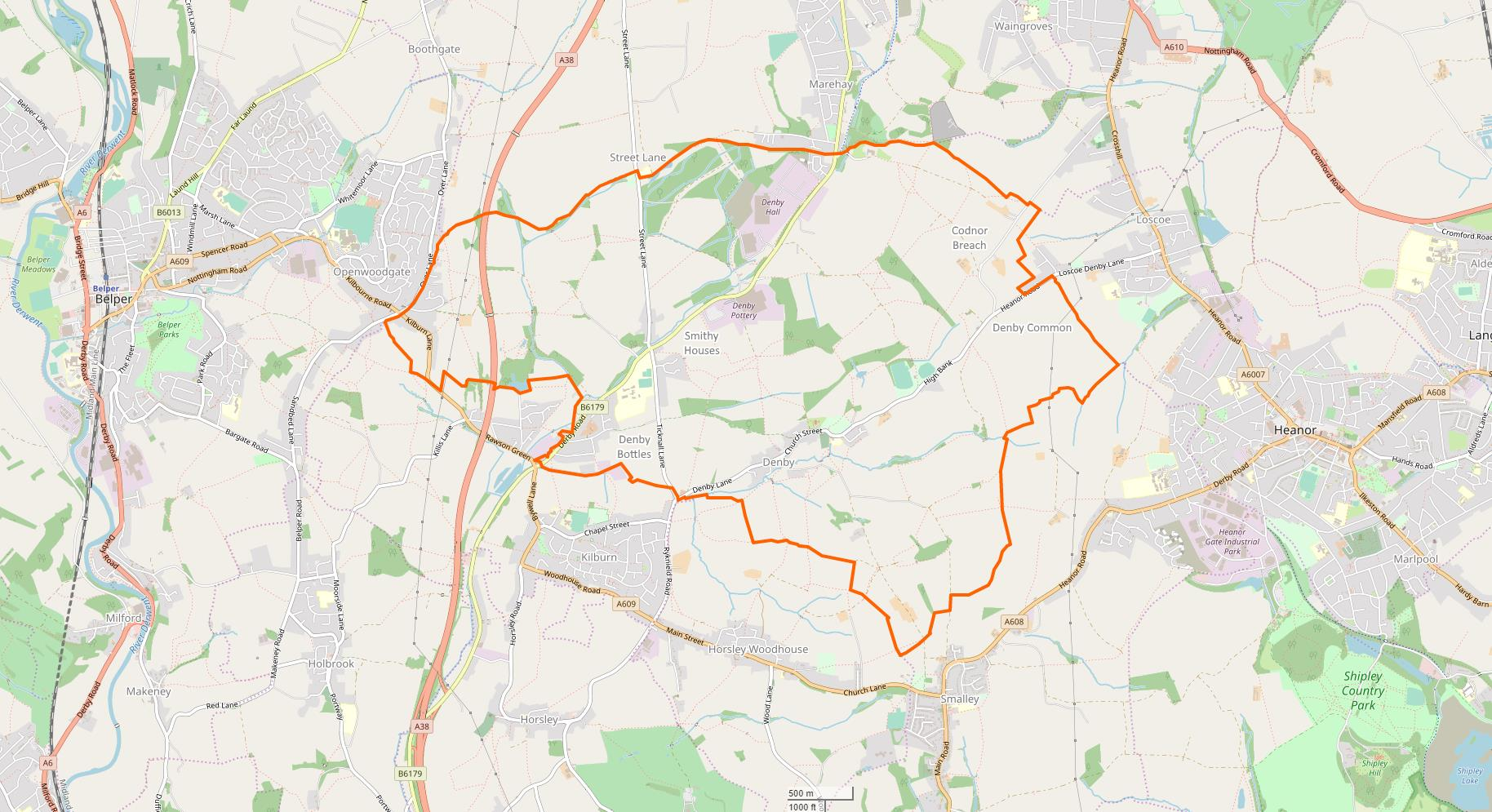
Denby parish boundary and local areas

- Denby Common is a hamlet 1 mile to the north east of Denby village, on the outskirts of Loscoe.
- Codnor Breach, another hamlet, merges into Denby Common.
- Denby Bottles is half a mile to the west of Denby Village.
- Smithy Houses lies north west of Denby Village, along the B6179 road.

All four of these, along with a small southern area of Marehay in Ripley, and a small portion of Openwoodgate near Belper, lie within Denby parish.

== History ==
The settlement was listed in the Domesday Book of 1086 as Denebi, with eight households. By 1334, it was a market town and held an annual fair in September. For over two centuries, ironstone and clay were being mined; coal mining started in the 1200s. Royal astronomer John Flamsteed (1646–1719) was born in Denby.

In 1806, William Bourne leased the clay bed that had been discovered while a road was being built. Three years later, the family began manufacturing salt-glazed pottery under the Bourne name, with son Joseph running the operation. By the time of the Second World War, Denby had switched to producing tableware as well as industrial parts. Brown was the primary colour but the company shifted toward more attractive colours after the war. Ownership of the company remained with the family until 1942; after several owners, Denby was acquired by a consortium that was funded by Valco Capital Partners. The enterprise continues today as the Denby Pottery Company.

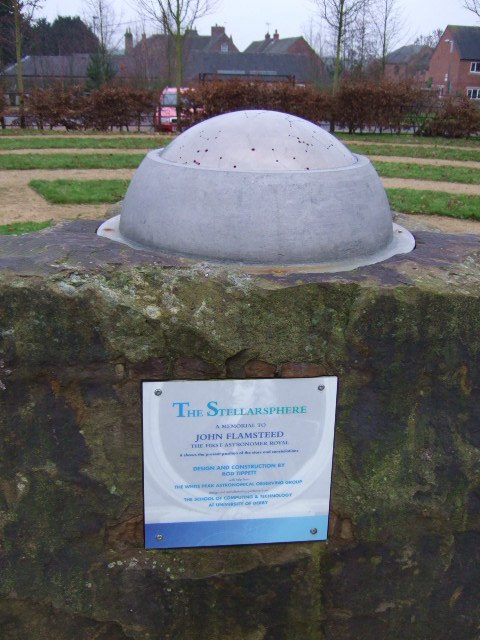
The Stellarsphere in the John Flamsteed Memorial Park (2006)

== The Stellarsphere ==
There is a memorial garden for John Flamsteed, opposite St Mary the Virgin's Church, which features a stellarsphere which shows the position of the stars and planets overhead at the current time.

The village is commemorated in the hymn tune Denby, composed in 1904 by Charles J. Dale.

== Sport and leisure ==
=== Cricket ===
Denby Cricket Club was officially founded in 1865, but recent research has revealed records of activity as far back as 1850. The club is based on The Copper Yard, off High Bank. Denby field five Senior XI teams in the Derbyshire County Cricket League and a long established Junior training section that play competitive cricket in the Notts & Derby Border Youth Cricket League.

=== The Denby Dash ===
The Denby Dash is an annual 5-mile race around the village countryside in late summer.

== Notable people ==
- Henry Draycott (ca.1510 – 1572), judge in Ireland.
- John Flamsteed (1646–1719), astronomer and the first Astronomer Royal.
- Harry Wingfield (1910–2002), illustrator, particularly in the Ladybird Books.

=== Sport ===
- Joseph Cresswell (1865–1932), a cricketer who played 15 first-class cricket games for Warwickshire.
- William Wilmot (1869–1957), a cricketer who played 10 first class games for Derbyshire.

== See also ==
- List of places in Derbyshire
- Listed buildings in Denby
