= Midland Railway Ripley Branch =

Railway in Derbyshire, England

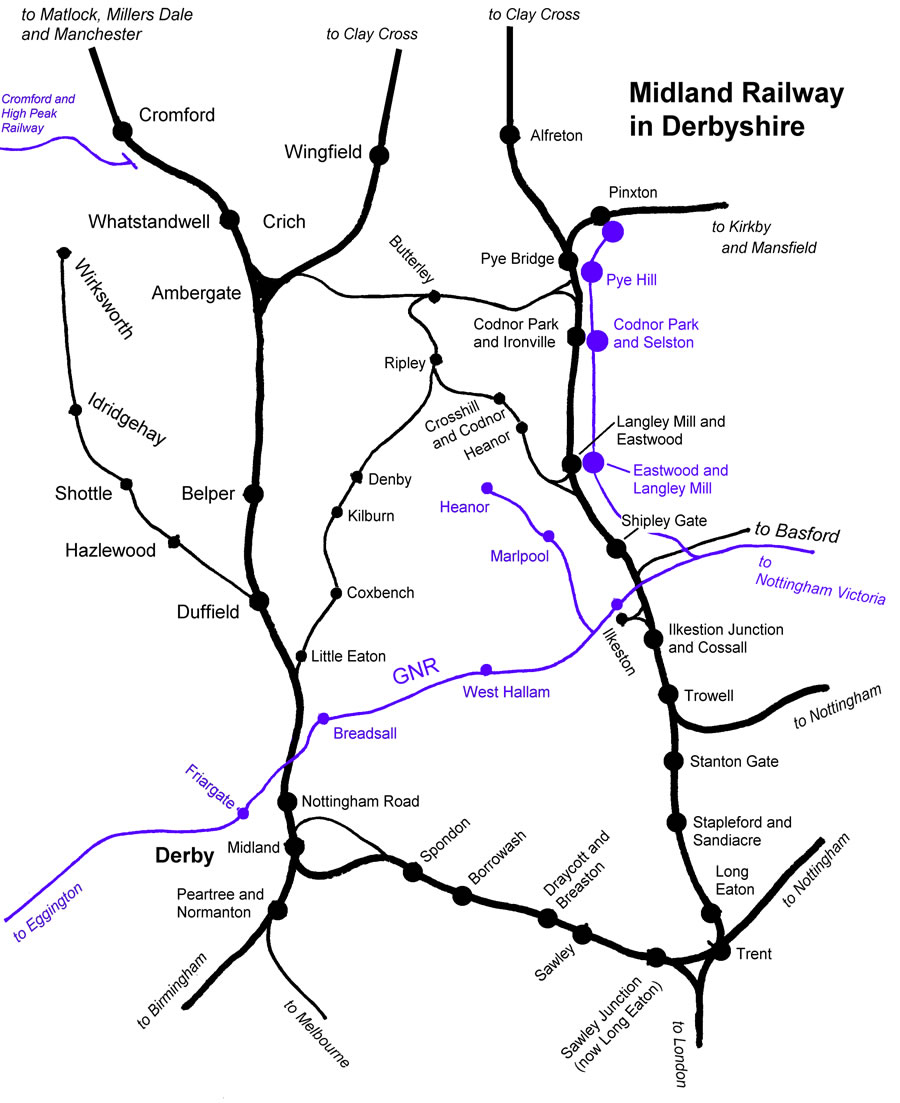

The Midland Railway Ripley Branch connected Derby to Ripley in Derbyshire, England running from Little Eaton Junction on the Midland Railway line to Leeds.

== Origin ==
In the late eighteenth century the valley running from the Derwent Valley to Ripley, had been the site of a number of collieries and ironstone workings. They were situated around Denby particularly, and there were also busy potteries. Improved transport links widened their market. (Note: Improved transport links allowed the expansion of the Denby Pottery Company which was founded in 1809) Those workings to the north of Ripley were catered for, from 1794, by the Cromford Canal. When the Derby Canal was built, it extended northwards to Little Eaton from where was built the Little Eaton Gangway in 1795, to cater for the area to the south, particularly its trade with Derby.

In 1830 the committee overseeing the gangway met to discuss the possibility of upgrading the line to utilise steam engines from Smithy Houses along the track of the gangway and the northern arm of the canal to Chester Green in Derby. George Stephenson reported on the idea but recommended that a completely new line should be built with the original continuing to operate.

Neither plan was adopted, but in 1847 the Midland Railway deposited plans for a branch at Little Eaton from its main line, with feeder lines from collieries at Marehay and White Lee (or Whiteley) to the south of Waingroves.

== Construction ==
Midland Railway (Ripley Branches) Act 1848
- Act of Parliament
- Parliament of the United Kingdom
- Long title: An Act to enable the Midland Railway Company to make certain Branches from and Enlargements of their Railway; and for other Purposes.
- Citation: 11 & 12 Vict. c. lxxxviii

Dates
- Royal assent: 22 July 1848

Text of statute as originally enacted

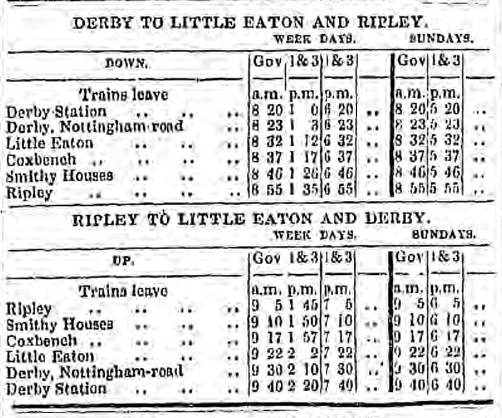
Timetable from the Derby Mercury 22 October 1856

The Midland Railway (Ripley Branches) Act 1848 (11 & 12 Vict. c. lxxxviii) was passed on 22 July 1848 and, by August, a spur from the main line reached the quarries at Little Eaton.

Midland Railway (Extension of Time) Act 1851
- Act of Parliament
- Parliament of the United Kingdom
- Long title: An Act to extend the Time for the Purchase of certain Lands and Completion of Works authorized by the "Midland Railway, Ripley Branches, Act, 1848," and on the Gloucester and Stonehouse Junction Railway.
- Citation: 14 & 15 Vict. c. cxiii

Dates
- Royal assent: 24 July 1851

There then followed a hiatus while work continued, but extended time was needed to complete purchasing land and completing the work, for which permission was granted in the Midland Railway (Extension of Time) Act 1851 (14 & 15 Vict. c. cxiii). The line was finally opened for freight as far as Ripley in September 1855.

However Board of Trade approval was still needed for passenger traffic, and a report was submitted by its inspector, Captain Tyler, in December. Opening to the public was postponed and, on 9 January, another inspector, Colonel Wynn provided a report. Captain Tyler reported again on 7 February and a third time on 4 March. Presumably, all this time, the line was recovering its investment by carrying coal and other minerals. The Midland was clearly aiming to provide the minimum of infrastructure, and the Colonel reported in April, twice in May, in June and July. Finally, on 20 August, the Captain was satisfied, having been told that the line would be worked "one engine in steam." The first passenger train to Ripley ran on 1 September 1856 with a timetable of 3 passenger services each way per day.

The gangway continued to operate until July 1908.

== Operation ==
Around Little Eaton there were a number of manufacturers, such as potteries, Dowding's paper mill and small quarries. Meanwhile, the valley was a prolific agricultural area, exporting its produce to Derby and beyond, particularly from Coxbench.

This area of Derbyshire had been important for ironworking since Norman times, and the use of charcoal for smelting was being superseded by coal. Both of these were very close to the surface and could extracted using drift mines or bell pits. The ruins of two furnaces opened at Morley Park are visible today from the A38. As the market increased deeper pits were dug to exploit what became known as the "Kilburn seam."

Coal traffic was such that, in 1903, Kilburn Colliery siding was extended to form a double track as far as Denby. Here, Kelly's Directory for 1891 notes: "Denby is noted for its extensive collieries, the property of William N. Drury- Lowe esq.; here also are large blast furnaces for the production of pig iron, belonging to the Denby Iron and Coal Co. Limited. There is a large pottery and extensive brick and tile works. The locality produces also ironstone, cement and brick earth."

In fact the ironstone in the area was of low quality, and the coal more suited for domestic use. After a while, therefore, they were imported from elsewhere. Foundry sand was also brought in from Mansfield. Meanwhile, the railway carried exports of house coal, pig iron and pottery from W&J Slater and the Denby Pottery. Towards Ripley, Denby Hall Colliery, the largest of all, was opened by the Butterley Company.

== Later history ==
It would seem that it was freight that provided the Midland's main income from the line. Initially three passenger trains were provided daily (except Sunday) in each direction. By 1903 this had increased to five, and they continued via Langley Mill to Mansfield.

In January 1906, trials were carried out with a railmotor on the Wirksworth Branch. On the first of March, the service was provided both to Melbourne and once a day to Ripley. The railmotors did not prove as successful as expected and the service finished at the beginning of the World War I. However until the end there were five trains a day from Derby to Ripley and six return, with an extra train on Tuesdays and Fridays and Saturdays, plus a return trip on Sunday evening which was also the milk train. Competition came from the Trent buses service number 1, (Note: Not the present service ONE) from Derby to Alfreton which ran near to the line over almost all its length, and the rail passenger service finished in 1930.

The line remained in use to serve a coal washing plant at Denby into the late twentieth century - traffic finally ceasing in 1999. After some time out of use, in early 2011 there was an abortive scheme to reopen it. However, the track between Denby and Holbrook level crossing was lifted in July–August 2011. The section from Holbrook level crossing to just short of the mainline connection near Little Eaton was lifted by contractor Trackwork of Doncaster during the first week of March 2012.

After several years of uncertainty as to the future of the route, the trackbed was converted to a public footpath called the Little Eaton Greenway during 2025.
