= Hodthorpe and Belph =

Civil parish in Derbyshire, England

Coordinates: 53.276°N 1.189°W

- Civil parish
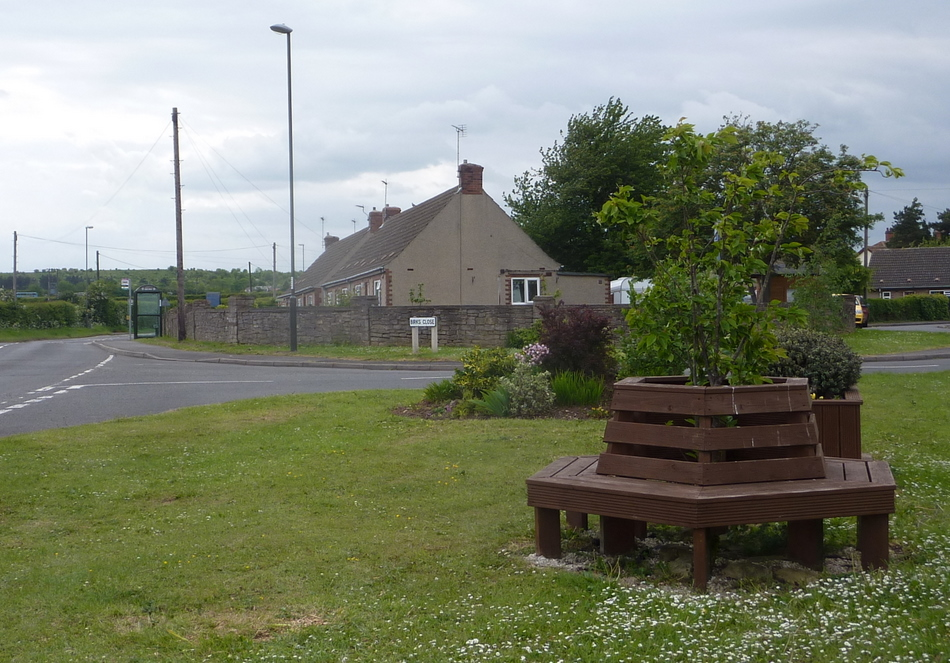
- Hodthorpe from the east

- Location within Derbyshire
- Interactive map of Hodthorpe and Belph
- Area: 2.04 sq mi (5.3 km^{2})
- Population: 663 (2011)
  - Density: 325/sq mi (125/km^{2})
- OS grid reference: SK 5476
  - London: 125 mi (201 km) SE
- District: Bolsover
- Shire county: Derbyshire
- Region: East Midlands
- Country: England
- Sovereign state: United Kingdom
- Settlements: Hodthorpe: Belph
- Post town: WORKSOP
- Postcode district: S80
- Dialling code: 01909
- Police: Derbyshire
- Fire: Derbyshire
- Ambulance: East Midlands
- UK Parliament: Bolsover

Hodthorpe and Belph is a civil parish within the Bolsover district, of the county of Derbyshire, England. The parish includes the village of Hodthorpe and the hamlet of Belph. In 2011 the parish had a population of 663. It is 132 miles north west of London, 27 miles north east of the county city of Derby, and 5 miles north east of the market town of Bolsover. The parish touches Welbeck, Whitwell, Elmton with Creswell and Holbeck, and is the easternmost in Derbyshire. There is one listed building in Hodthorpe and Belph.

== Toponymy ==
Belph: It has been suggested this placename derives from Belge meaning 'roaring river', although only gentle flowing streams are in the vicinity. A further claim is one from the Old English term belg meaning 'bag', used in respect of the geography of the area. Another possible form is of Norman/Saxon origin, le bulgh meaning 'gap', possibly in reference to the gorge by the stream nearby. The nameplace itself was not reported in Domesday however, only being first mentioned in public records from 1179.

Hodthorpe: The hod is derived from the name of a local 19th century landowner, Henry Sweet Hodding who provided housing land for miners and their families at the nearby Whitwell Colliery, with thorpe the Old English for village. Originally known as Hoddingthorpe, by the turn of the 20th century the placename had become shortened to its present-day form.

Hodthorpe and Belph, as a political entity was separated from Whitwell parish in 2011.

== Geography ==
=== Location ===
Hodthorpe and Belph is surrounded by the following local areas:

- Whitwell to the north and west
- Holbeck to the south
- Worksop to the east
- Elmton and Creswell to the west.

=== Settlements ===
The two settlements within the parish are:

- Hodthorpe
- Belph

==== Hodthorpe ====
The larger village of the two areas, it is sited adjacent to the Worksop to Nottingham Robin Hood Line and the route between Whitwell and the A60 road. Hodthorpe's heritage is as a mining village and has been in existence since the beginning of the 20th century. It lies to the central north of the parish, and while primarily residential with few roads, the village maintains some core amenities such as school, village community centre and shop.

==== Belph ====
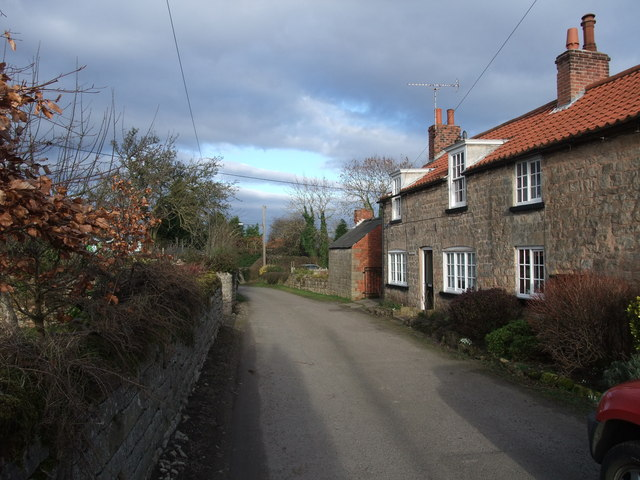
Belph hamlet

This is 1/2 mile (3/4 km) south of Hodthorpe, separated by greenfield land. Belph is a rural hamlet comprising a nucleus of buildings centred around Mill Wood Lane, and a smaller cluster of buildings known as Penny Green which developed primarily from the 19th century onwards around Millash Lane/Station Road. Belph is the easternmost residential settlement within the county of Derbyshire. A large proportion of the land and buildings in Belph are held by the Welbeck Estate.

=== Landscape ===
==== Geology ====
The parish lies on the eastern edge of the Permian Limestone belt - a narrow range of rock running roughly north–south, the western dip-slope of which is characterised by the descent from Barlborough to Renishaw, and whose eastern range dips away from Red Hill to Worksop. To the west lies the Pennine Coal Measures Group, and in the east the New Red Sandstone belt is found. The Permian limestones outcrop in places, most notably at Creswell Crags, but are usually overlain by shallow clay or soils, which lend well to arable cultivation. The stone can be burnt to provide lime and is suitable for building purposes.

==== Woods ====
Primarily farmland throughout the parish outside the villages, there is some small forestry south of Belph surrounding the industrial areas.

==== Water features ====
The Millwood Brook is much of the eastern boundary of the parish, feeding into Crags Pond at its southern extent.

Walling Brook forms part of the north eastern parish boundary, with Dalfoulds Dyke running by the northern parish edge.

==== Land elevation ====
Within the northern and eastern areas, the land level is low-lying and flat, varying between 55–70 metres (180–230 ft).

Belph is at 60 metres (200 ft), Penny Green at 65 metres (213 ft) and Hodthorpe at 70–80 metres (230–260 ft).

To the centre and west of the parish there is a former mining spoil tip rising to 90 metres (300 ft).

The parish peak is also to the west within the quarry at 100 metres (330 ft).

== History ==
=== Prehistoric Age ===
Around 120,000 years ago, Britain was experiencing a warmer period than the present day, known as the Ipswichian Interglacial. The earliest fossils at Creswell Crags date from this time, including those of hippopotamus, narrow-nosed rhinoceros and cave hyena. Around 50,000 years ago, Neanderthals used the caves found there, with the environment being a cool, damp grassland with less taller trees. After the Neanderthals left Creswell Crags, there being a long period before the first member of our own species began to use the caves. Around 29,000 years ago, the area was still a very open grassland. There is only a small amount of evidence in Britain of these early Homo sapiens visitors, with the climate going into a deeper cooling cycle from around 24,000 years ago. Eventually, Britain warmed enough for Ice Age people to return to use the caves as seasonal hunting camps. Evidence of these people date to around 13,000 years ago. Extinct animals remains and fossils found locally include the woolly mammoth, woolly rhinoceros and the scimitar-toothed cat.

=== Belph ===
The more historic of the two locations, Belph was a small dormitory settlement to Whitwell, possibly by 1086 although it was not recorded in the Domesday Book. The surrounding area which today forms the county boundary with Nottinghamshire was a portion of Sherwood Forest and heavily wooded until at least the mid-twelfth century, and Belph was established within a forest clearing. It seems that Belph was populated from Whitwell and was likely a part of that lordship. As the manor of Whitwell was subdivided, the land between Belph and the site of Welbeck Abbey was acquired by Richard le Fleming, the descendant of one of William I's followers. Richard's son Thomas of Cuckney acquired Belph, which is separated from Whitwell by Belph Moor and as a result was possibly sold off by the Lord of Whitwell. Thomas later founded Welbeck Abbey in 1153, after which he bequeathed the abbey, Belph and the land between the two to the canons at Welbeck.

Belph was very small, housing serfs who farmed the surrounding lands which were used primarily for grazing with only sufficient arable land for their own needs. The cottages possibly also housed estate workers such as gardeners and the wood men. It was not until the end of the 16th century that the hamlet was referred to as Belph(e) and is likely to have only referred to the hamlet itself, whereas the surrounding lands particularly around the Grange area, were known as Hirst, derived from the Old English ‘hyrst’, a wooded bank, which was an outlying farm attached to the Abbey. As a tiny settlement, Belph was an integrated part of the Welbeck Estate and so there is little reference to the placename after this period until 1846. Following the dissolution of the monasteries, Belph passed with Welbeck to Richard Whalley who was granted the estate by the Crown in 1539 and later sold Welbeck in 1559. Between the late 16th and early 17th centuries the Welbeck lease passed from Gilbert Talbot, 7th Earl of Shrewsbury to Sir Charles Cavendish, Bess of Hardwick's third son, and remained in the Cavendish family.

The association between Welbeck and the Dukes of Portland began in 1734 when the 2nd Duke acquired the estate with his marriage to Margaret Cavendish Harley. However, Welbeck did not become the main family seat until William Bentinck, 4th Duke of Portland (1809-1854) sold the family's Buckinghamshire estates. The 4th Duke's priority was the management of his estates and it would appear that Belph benefited from this. The 4th Duke was an avid agriculturalist and as such, seems to have played a key role in the enclosure of land in Whitwell and Belph. The enclosure of lands in Whitwell had been taking place since the 16th century and was largely completed in the open fields by 1813 when the Duke of Portland exchanged lands in Great Barlow for lands in the parish of Whitwell owned by the Duke of Rutland. It seems probable that the two Dukes came to an agreement that the parliamentary enclosure of the remaining common and wasteland should take place in the parish, and the following year the Whitwell Enclosure Act was passed. The Whitwell Enclosure Award showed Belph to be an area of early enclosure surrounded by greens. Most of the buildings in the hamlet date from the 18th and early 19th centuries. The Enclosure Award and the 1839 Whitwell Tithe Map show that the Mill Wood Lane area of Belph closely resembles the settlement pattern seen today, as Springfield Farm and several of the cottages appear on the map.

However, it is during the 4th Duke of Portland's time and the post-enclosure period that the smaller settlement at Penny Green took shape. The 4th Duke of Portland's influence in Belph during this period is indicated by the naming of the Portland Arms public house on Belph Road (now Station Road). The Penny Green Cottages date from the mid-19th century. Business directories of the time provide an insight into the development of Belph, in 1857 Belph was described as a scattered hamlet which included a blacksmith's shop, the Portland Arms and three farms, two of which were Springfield Farm and Belph Grange. Only limited development was recorded as taking place in the directories in the late 19th and early 20th centuries. By the late 20th century only one new property had been built, whilst several buildings along Mill Wood Lane had been removed, and the Portland Arms having been converted back to private accommodation. By this period Belph had become a largely residential hamlet as The Portland Arms had closed by 1922 and the decline of the agricultural industry highlighted by Springfield Farm which became unoccupied.

=== Hodthorpe ===
The manor of Whitwell was a portion of the Earl of Rutland's estate until 1813, after which it became associated to the Welbeck Estate owned by the Duke of Portland. Although the Duke owned some land in what would become Hodthorpe, a larger section of approx. 56½ acres, was once part of Birks Farm, then owned by the Duke of Newcastle-under-Lyne and part of the Worksop Manor Estate. There was a major sale of land by auction in the Worksop area by the Duke of Newcastle in 1890, and private sales of some land had taken place several years previously. The railway was built at Whitwell by 1875, its track between Worksop and Whitwell cut through Larpit (Lowpit) Lane, providing a visible boundary, with Whitwell to the west, and the land in which Hodthorpe would be built, to the east. Shireoaks Colliery Company Ltd. who opened their fourth colliery in 1890–91, on an area of land known as Belph Moor, immediately south of Whitwell train station. The company had leased this land from the 6th Duke of Portland, who was then the principal landowner and the Lord of the manor of Whitwell.

Another of the landowners was Henry Sweet Hodding, a local solicitor, who lived at Harness Grove in nearby Darfoulds to the north, and he provided most of the land for the settlement. As the village began to grow it became known as ‘Hoddingthorpe’, a combination of the name ‘Hodding’ and ‘thorpe’ which is a medieval term for village, from which the name of "Hodthorpe" eventually derived. There did not appear to have been any set pattern of housebuilding in Hodthorpe, as some of the earlier properties are found in what was known as "the bottom end". A terrace of four red brick houses called "Bentinck Cottages" and are now 1, 3, 5, and 7 Broad Place were amongst the earliest to be built. Originally a few stone cottages were in the area in which the village would later develop, and these were known as "Stoneycroft", they were however demolished in 1933–35, and was sited immediately opposite the Junior & Infant School. Lowpit (or Larpit) Lane was the main street which ran from Whitwell, it was renamed Queens Road, and straightened as it met Broad Lane near the eastern boundary of the parish and county. Close to this eastern boundary is Birks Farm and Hall Leys Farm. On Queens Road, by the ‘top end’, there is a pair of semi-detached brick houses having a date stone which is inscribed "Daisy Cottages 1897", and by the ‘bottom end’ the ‘Prospect Villas’ were built in 1903.

In 1909 the Hodthorpe Working Mens Club was built. Initially the club allowed men only, until 1955 when the club was enlarged with the creation of a new concert room. From this time onwards, ladies were admitted and able to become full members.

On 22 August 1940 the village was bombed. 20 bombs were dropped causing damage. There were no deaths, but 40 people were left homeless, of which 15 were injured.

=== Industry ===
The key industries throughout the ages have been agriculture, quarrying and subsequently coal mining.

==== Quarrying ====
For many centuries, the wider area contained many small quarries, which have provided stone for building, road making and lime burning. A now unused location was north of Station Lane and south west of Hodthorpe, mining sandstone until the turn of the 20th century. A more recent large site has been in operation along Crags Road since 1958.

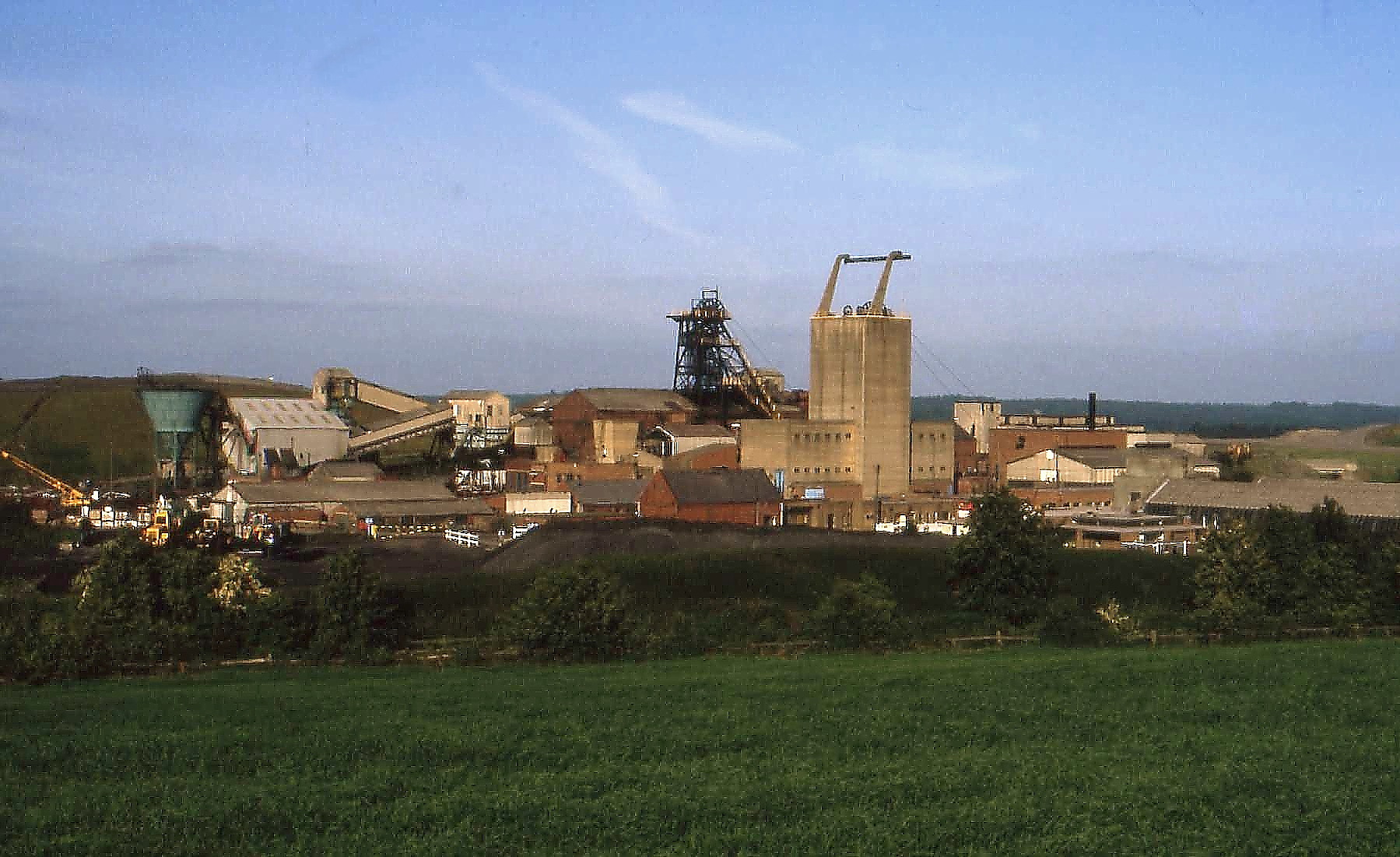
Whitwell Colliery in 1986

==== Whitwell Colliery ====
An area of to the west of Belph called Belph Moor was developed into Whitwell Colliery.

Shireoaks Colliery Company Ltd. obtained the lease to sink the colliery in February 1890 from the 6th Duke of Portland, who lifted the first sod on 24 May 1890. After shaft sinking and development of the mine, coal production started on a regular basis from 15 April 1894. Throughout the life of Whitwell Colliery, coal was produced from four seams: Top Hard, High Hazel, Clowne and Two Foot. The highest production years were in the early 1960s with approximately 600,000 tons per year. On 3 June 1986 an announcement was made that coal production would cease by the end of June. Newspapers of the time reported heavy losses of around £8 million over the previous year. Cost of producing coal at the time was £69 per ton against a selling price of £42. Of the workforce of 750, the number transferring to other collieries was 389, with most of those remaining (50 years old and over) accepting early retirement. The last day of production was 27 June 1986, with the last worker finishing in July 1987.

=== Religious sites ===
Prior to parish separation, the main Church of England sites of worship were St Lawrence's in Whitwell with its sister church All Saints at the nearby hamlet of Steetley. Although no church was ever built at Belph, a Mission Church of St. Martin was built on King Street in the centre of Hodthorpe in 1897. A Primitive Methodist chapel was later also constructed there adjacent to the railway line by King Street in 1903–4, later closing in the early 1950s. A church hall built aside the Mission church was opened in 1955, but both church and hall closed in 1991.

== Governance and demography ==
=== Council administration ===
There are 663 residents recorded within the parish for the 2011 census.

The settlements Hodthorpe, Belph and their surrounding rural areas are combined as one parish for administrative identity. This is managed at the first level of public administration by Hodthorpe and Belph Parish Council. At district level, the wider area is overseen by Bolsover District Council. Derbyshire County Council provides the highest level strategic services locally.

== Education ==
There is a school in the core village, Hodthorpe Primary.

== Community & leisure ==
A community hall is in use at Hodthorpe village.

== Landmarks ==
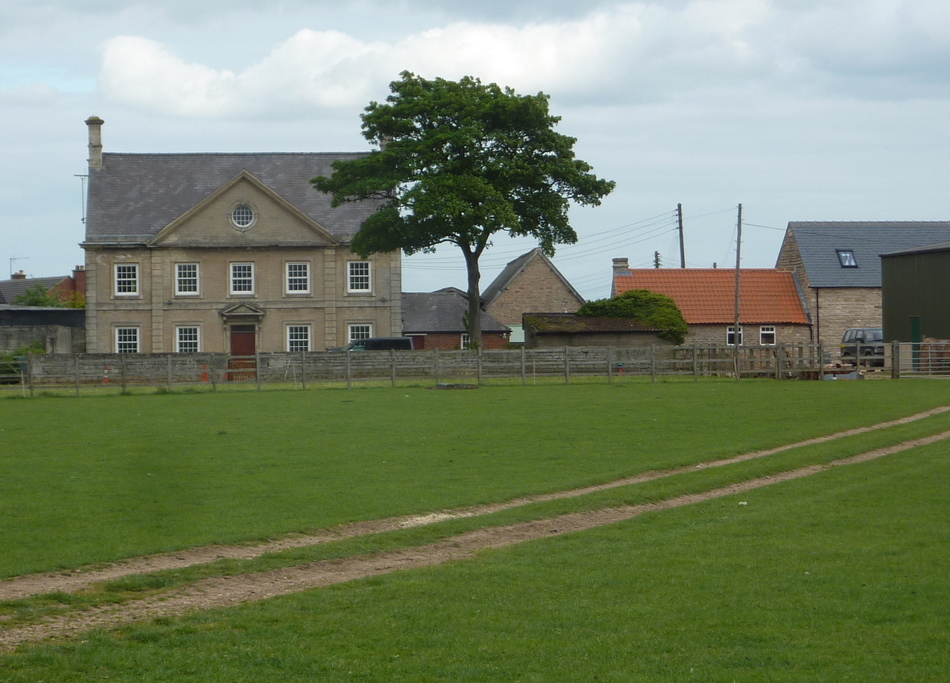
The Birks Farmhouse

=== Listed buildings ===
There is one listed structure in the parish, The Birks Farmhouse northeast of Hodthorpe:

=== Creswell Crags ===
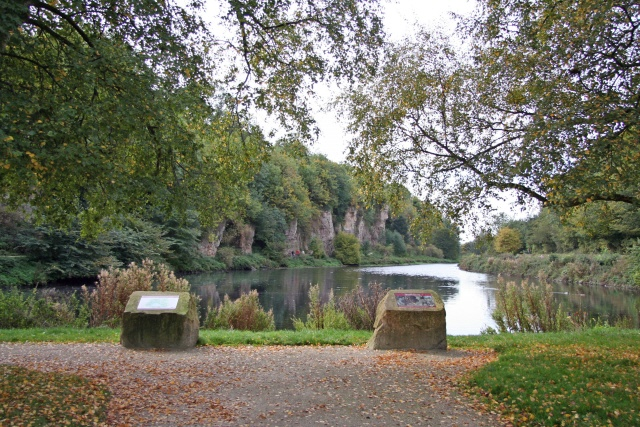
Creswell Crags and Crags Pond

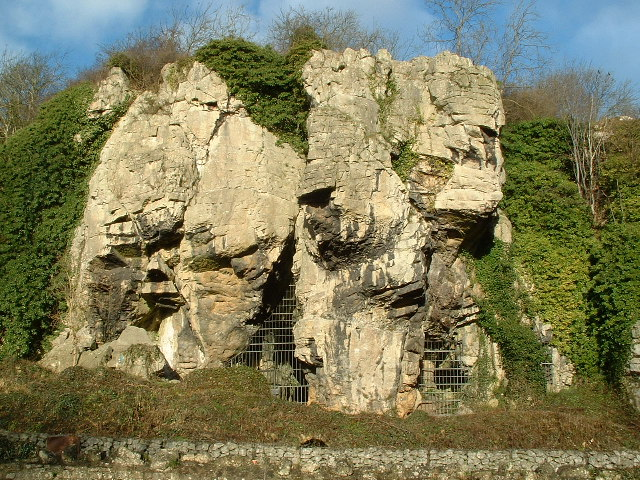
Caves at Creswell Crags

Although named after the nearby village, this is sited on the Derbyshire/Nottinghamshire border within Hodthorpe and Belph parish. Creswell Crags is an enclosed limestone gorge on the southern border of the parish, the cliffs in the ravine containing several caves that were occupied during the last ice age, between around 43,000 and 10,000 years ago. Its caves contain the northernmost cave art in Europe. The evidence of occupation is regarded as internationally unique in demonstrating how prehistoric people managed to live at the extreme northernmost limits of their territory. The area has been designated as a Site of Special Scientific Interest (SSSI).

== Transport ==
The Worksop to Nottingham railway, Robin Hood Line forms the north western boundary of the parish, running from north east to south west.

The nearest train station is at Whitwell.
