= Belph =

Coordinates: 53.276°N 1.172°W

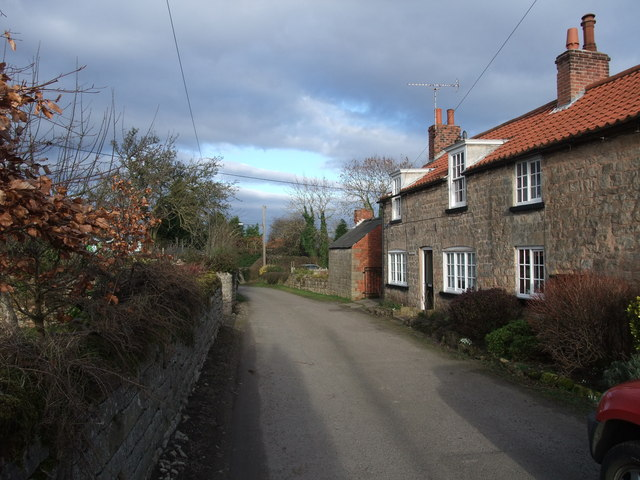
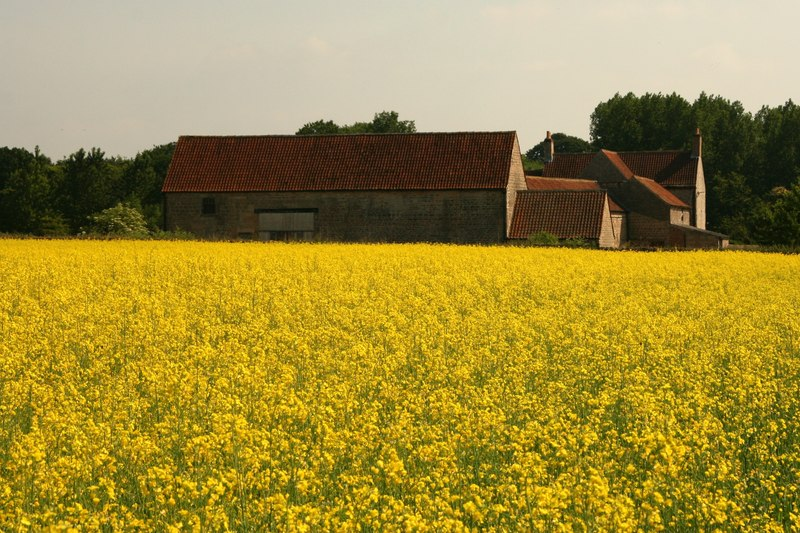
- Mill Wood Lane Belph Grange

- Location within Derbyshire
- OS grid reference: SK553758
- Civil parish: Hodthorpe and Belph
- District: Bolsover
- Shire county: Derbyshire
- Region: East Midlands
- Country: England
- Sovereign state: United Kingdom
- Post town: WORKSOP
- Postcode district: S80
- Police: Derbyshire
- Fire: Derbyshire
- Ambulance: East Midlands

Belph is a hamlet in the parish of Hodthorpe and Belph, within the district of Bolsover, in the county of Derbyshire, England. It is part of the Welbeck Abbey Estate, on the edge of modern-day Sherwood Forest. The village is 1 mile (1.6 km) south-east of Hodthorpe, 1 mile (1.6 km) south-east of Whitwell and 3 miles (4.8 km) south-west of Worksop (where the population is listed). The village is the easternmost settlement in Derbyshire.

The village has two parts, Belph Village and Penny Green. Belph Village consists of about 30 houses either side of a single lane. A number were originally farmhouses; all except Springfield Farm are now private homes.

Penny Green consists of a row of eight labourers' cottages built in the 1900s on the Whitwell Station Road, and a large stone cottage. The latter was once the Portland Arms (a pub). On the Creswell Crags Road are Brook Cottages, three stone-built 19th-century cottages.

An area of the village known as the "Millash" was located where a stream flows from a natural fault. The ruins of two mills survive, the rest of the hamlet being buried under a spoil tip left by the now defunct Whitwell Colliery.

== Etymology ==
It has long been thought that the name Belph is a corruption of the Norman French/Saxon Bulgh, meaning "forest stream".
