= Grade I listed churches in Derbyshire =

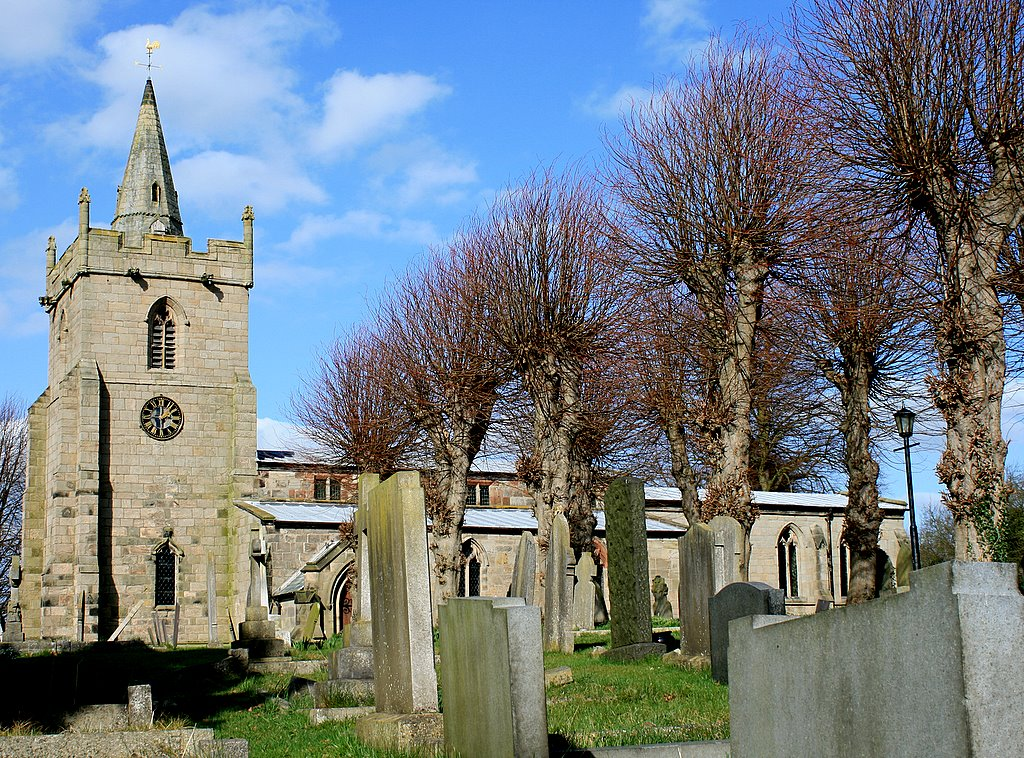
St Michael and All Angels, Church Broughton

Derbyshire is a county in the East Midlands of England. The ceremonial county of Derbyshire includes the unitary authority of the city of Derby. This is a complete list of the Grade I listed churches and chapels in the ceremonial county as recorded in the National Heritage List for England. Buildings are listed by the Secretary of State for Culture, Media and Sport on the recommendation of Historic England. Grade I listed buildings are defined as being of "exceptional interest, sometimes considered to be internationally important"; only 2.5 per cent of listed buildings are included in this grade.

Christian churches have existed in Derbyshire since the Anglo-Saxon era, and some of the Grade I listed churches have retained Saxon features. St. Wystan's Church, Repton, has a complete Anglo-Saxon crypt, and some churches have fragments of Anglo-Saxon stones incorporated in their structure, including All Saints' Church, Aston-upon-Trent, and All Saints, Bakewell. More churches contain elements of Norman architecture. The architectural historian Nikolaus Pevsner identified the two most important Norman churches as St Michael with St Mary's Church, Melbourne, and All Saints' Church, Steetley, the latter being little more than a chapel. Most of the churches in the list date from the 15th century or before, and the predominant architectural style in the list is Gothic. Only three churches in the list originate after 1600, namely St Saviour's Church, Foremark, built in 1662, St Mary's Church, Cromford, the building of which started in 1792, and Church of All Saints, Hassop, built in 1816–17, and the only Neoclassical church in the list.

Derbyshire is a largely rural county, and contains much of the Peak District National Park. Past industries have included coal-mining, and quarrying of stone continues in the county. Industry is located mainly in and around Derby. The bedrock of much of the county is carboniferous limestone, with areas of sandstone and millstone Grit, these stones providing the major building materials for the churches.

== Churches ==
Name	Location	Photograph	Notes
St Oswald	Ashbourne; 53.0150°N 1.7387°W		A church existed on the site in the Saxon era, and the present church has a Norman crypt. The chancel dates from about 1220, and is in Early English style with lancet windows. The church has a cruciform plan with a tower and a spire rising to 215 feet (66 m) at the crossing. Much of the church is in Perpendicular style, with battlements added to the chancel in 1878 by George Gilbert Scott. The north transept forms the Boothby chapel, which contains monuments to the Boothby and Cockayne families.
All Saints	Ashover; 53.1641°N 1.4800°W		A church is recorded in the Domesday Book, but the present church dates mainly from the 15th century, with material remaining from the 13th and 14th centuries. It has a west tower with a recessed spire. Inside the church is a Norman lead font dating from about 1150.
All Saints	Aston-on-Trent; 52.8601°N 1.3852°W		All Saints dates from the 12th century, with alterations and additions in each of the following four centuries. It contains Saxon masonry in the nave. The lower parts of the west tower are Norman, and the upper parts are Perpendicular. The church was restored in 1853 and again in 1873. The font dates from the 13th century, and also in the church is an alabaster tomb chest from the early 15th century.
St John the Baptist	Ault Hucknall; 53.1822°N 1.3020°W		A church originating from the 11th century, it was altered or extended in the 14th and 15th centuries, and was restored in 1885–88 by William Butterfield. It has a tower at the crossing, and contains Norman architecture.
All Saints	Bakewell; 53.2129°N 1.6786°W		This church, with its cruciform plan, is an ancient foundation. There are fragments of Anglo-Saxon and Norman stones incorporated in the walls, and Norman features remain in the west front and the first bay of the arcades. At one period it was a collegiate church. In the middle of the 13th century, parts of the church were rebuilt, and other parts were extended, including the south transept. In the early 19th century the crossing with its spire had become unsafe. The spire was demolished and rebuilt and the transepts were made safer, and there have been later alterations.
St Wilfrid	Barrow upon Trent; 52.8518°N 1.4773°W		The church was initially owned by the Knights Hospitaller. It dates from the middle of the 12th century, the north aisle and the two east bays remaining from that time. The rest of the nave and the south aisle were built in the 14th century, and the clerestory was added in about 1400.
All Saints	Bradbourne; 53.0717°N 1.6909°W		All Saints dates from the 12th century, but was extensively remodelled in the 14th century, and restored in 1846. It has a west tower; the parapets of both the tower and the aisles are battlemented. One of the chancel windows incorporates re-used 14th-century stained glass. The font is square with a circular basin.
All Saints	Brailsford; 52.9683°N 1.6368°W		The church originated in the 12th century, with alterations in the 14th and 15th centuries and, to the south porch, in 1629. A vestry was added in the 19th century. The church has a west tower embraced by the south aisle. The interior has retained some Norman features. The benches, with their finely carved bench ends, were installed in the 1880s.
St Peter and St Paul	Brampton; 53.2433°N 1.4978°W		The church dates mainly from the 14th century with earlier remains, including a Norman window and doorway. The later additions and alterations are in Perpendicular style. The church was restored in 1868, and contains fragments of sculpture dating from about 1300. There is also a 13th-century grave slab.
All Saints	Breadsall; 52.9543°N 1.4491°W		The south doorway is Norman, and there are features of Early English, Decorated, and Perpendicular styles elsewhere. The church was damaged by fire in 1914, and restored by W. D. Caröe. Between the north aisle and the chancel is a squint. Inside the church is a 14th-century alabaster sculpture of the Pietà.
St Michael	Breaston; 52.8970°N 1.3176°W		Dating from the 11th century, alterations were made in the 13th and 14th centuries. The clerestory was added in the 15th century. The church was restored, and a vestry was added in 1895 by Evans and Jolley. The west tower dates from the 13th century, and has a short broached spire. The east window contains Decorated tracery.
St Mary and All Saints	Chesterfield; 53.2361°N 1.4244°W		The church is best known for its twisted spire, which is located at the crossing. This was added to the church in about 1362, and is constructed with a timber frame covered in lead plates. The twist is due to warping of the timber. The spire is 228 feet (69 m) high, leans 9 feet 6 inches (2.9 m) to the southwest, and has a twist of 45°. Another unusual feature is the polygonal apse in the south transept. The church was restored in 1843 by George Gilbert Scott. Inside the church is a Norman font and a Jacobean pulpit.
St Michael and All Angels	Church Broughton; 52.9009°N 1.6962°W		Although most of the church dates from the 14th century, there are Norman features in the north arcade. Other features date from the 15th, 18th and 19th centuries. Inside the church are a 14th-century sedilia and piscina, a Norman font with carvings of zigzags and circles.
St Chad	Church Wilne; 52.8822°N 1.3344°W		St Chad's stands in an isolated position beside St Chad's Water; it was originally the parish church of Draycott. It was built in the 13th, 14th and 15th centuries, with the Willoughby Chapel added to the south in 1822. The chapel is elaborately decorated and contains monuments to members of the Willoughby family. The church was damaged by fire in 1917 and was restored between that year and 1923 by Currey and Thompson.
St Mary	Crich; 53.0880°N 1.4819°W		St Mary's dates from at least 1135 and has a Norman nave. The aisles date from the 13th century, and the chancel from the following century. At the west end is a tower with a recessed octagonal spire; the parapet of the tower consists of a wavy band with trefoils. In the chancel is a plain ogee-headed sedilia, and a built-in stone bible rest. The font is Norman.
St Mary	Cromford; 53.1104°N 1.5538°W		Built for Richard Arkwright near his Cromford Mill, St Mary's was designed by Thomas Gardner. Construction started in 1792, but was not completed until after Arkwright's death. The church was largely rebuilt in 1858 by H. I. Stevens. Later in the 19th century a scheme of wall paintings and stained glass was executed by A. O. Hemming. Also in the church are monuments to members of the Arkwright family.
St Andrew	Cubley; 52.9364°N 1.7561°W		The church dates from the middle of the 11th century, with alterations and additions during the following two centuries, and in the 15th and 17th centuries. It was restored in 1872–74 by J. P. St Aubyn, and the south porch was added in 1909. The font is Norman, and there are fragments of 14th-century glass in the chancel windows. Also in the chancel is an alabaster tomb chest dated 1494.
All Saints	Dale Abbey; 52.9429°N 1.3507°W		This is one of the smallest churches in England, and is attached to a house. It dates from the 12th century, the nave containing Norman masonry. Most of the rest of the church is Perpendicular. Inside the church are box pews, a gallery, a pulpit dated 1634, and 13th-century wall paintings.
St Mary	Denby; 53.0143°N 1.4072°W		The church dates from the early 13th century, with alterations during the following two centuries and in 1838 when the north arcade was removed and replaced by a gallery. The church was restored in 1901–03 by John Oldrid Scott. At the west end is a tower with a recessed broach spire. In the chancel is a 14th-century double sedilia, and there is a small trefoil-headed piscina at the east end of the north aisle.
St Cuthbert	Doveridge; 52.9042°N 1.8322°W		Dating from the 12th century, the church contains Norman fabric in the lower part of the tower. The church stands in the grounds of the former Doveridge Hall. Alterations were made to the church in the 13th, 14th and 15th centuries, and it was restored in 1840 and again in 1869. At the west end is a tower with a recessed spire. Inside the church the north arcade has three bays, and the south arcade has four. One of the windows contains fragments of medieval glass.
St John the Baptist	Dronfield; 53.3015°N 1.4720°W		Dating from the late 13th and the 14th centuries, there has been a succession of later alterations. It has a west tower surmounted by a spire with two tiers of lucarnes, and a two-storey north vestry. Inside the church is a Jacobean pulpit, and a triple sedilia. In two windows in the chancel, and one in the nave, are fragments of 14th-century glass.
St Alkmund	Duffield; 52.9811°N 1.4809°W		Originating in the early 14th century, the church was altered during the 15th and 17th centuries. It was restored in 1847 by J. P. St Aubyn and again in 1896–97 by John Oldrid Scott. The tower dates from the early 14th century, and has a recessed spire. In the church are monuments, the earliest dated 1439.
St Peter and St Paul	Eckington; 53.3132°N 1.3531°W		The church originates from the 12th century, with alterations and additions in each of the following three centuries. There is Norman architecture remaining in the arcades. The tower is from the 13th century, with its recessed spire probably from the next century. The south aisle and south porch were remodelled in 1763 by John Platt. The clerestory is in Perpendicular style and is castellated. There is a squint between the north aisle and the chancel. In the church are monuments to the Sitwell family dating from the 17th century.
St Peter	Edensor; 53.2256°N 1.6260°W		St Peter's is located in a village close to Chatsworth House. Although originating in the 12th century it was largely rebuilt in the late 1860s by George Gilbert Scott for the 7th Duke of Devonshire.
St Wilfrid	Egginton; 52.8475°N 1.6042°W		The church dates from about 1300, replacing earlier churches on the site. Alterations were made in the 15th, 16th and 17th centuries. In 1891 a restoration was carried out by Evans and Jolly. The church has an embattled west tower with gargoyles and plain pinnacles. Both the south aisle and the chancel contain a sedilia, a piscina and an aumbry. Fragments of glass dating from the 13th century and later have been re-set in the east window.
St Bartholomew	Elvaston; 52.8927°N 1.3965°W		The church is located adjacent to Elvaston Castle. It dates from the 13th century, with alterations in the 14th, 15th, and 18th centuries. The chancel was extended and restored in 1903 by G. F. Bodley.
St Helen	Etwall; 52.8847°N 1.6018°W		St Helen's dates from the 12th century, with additions and alterations in the 15th, 15th, and 17th centuries. A north vestry was added early in the 19th century when it was restored. A further restoration was carried out in 1881 by F. J. Robinson. In the chancel is a 13th-century stone lectern built into the north wall, and a small piscina in each side of the altar.
St Saviour	Foremark; 52.8348°N 1.5120°W		The church was built in 1662. It contains 17th-century box pews, and a three-decker pulpit. A screen from the same period has a triple opening, above which is a pediment containing 17th-century stained glass.
St Giles	Great Longstone; 53.2438°N 1.7015°W		The church dates from the 13th century, with later alterations. It was restored in 1871–73 by Norman Shaw. Much of the church is in Perpendicular style.
All Saints	Hassop; 53.2475°N 1.6667°W		Built as a private chapel for the Roman Catholic Eyre family of nearby Hassop Hall, All Saints was designed by Joseph Ireland and constructed in 1816–17. Its architectural style is Neoclassical with a portico in the style of an Etruscan temple. The side windows are Grecian in style, and at the east end are Tuscan pilasters. Inside the church is a coved coffered ceiling, and a large painting of the Crucifixion said to be by Ludovico Carracci.
St Michael and All Angels	Hathersage; 53.3331°N 1.6502°W		Dating mainly from the 14th and 15th centuries, the church was restored in 1851–52 by William Butterfield. Further alterations were carried out in 1949. The west tower is surmounted by a crocketed octagonal spire. The parapets of the tower and body of the church are battlemented. In the chancel are a 14th-century ogee-headed piscina and a triple sedilia. Monuments to the Eyre family date from the 15th century.
St Peter	Hope; 53.3478°N 1.7426°W		The church dates from the 14th and 15th centuries, the tower was rebuilt in 1728, and the chancel in 1881. The chancel incorporates a piscina and sedilia dating from about 1300. The font has a 12th-century bowl. The pulpit is dated 1652, and there are framed paintings from 1733.
St Clement	Horsley; 52.9965°N 1.4422°W		St Clement's dates from the early 14th century. It was altered in the middle of the following century, and restored in 1858–60. At the west end is a tower with a broach spire containing gabled lucarnes. The parapets of the aisles and clerestory are battlemented with crocketed pinnacles. The font dates from the 15th century.
All Saints	Kedleston; 52.9592°N 1.5367°W		All Saints Church stands next to Kedleston Hall, and dates from the 12th century, although the only remaining fabric from that time is the Norman south doorway. Alterations and additions were made in the 13th, 14th and 17th centuries, the church was restored in 1885, and the north aisle was added in 1907–09 by G. F. Bodley. The church contains many monuments to the Curzon family. It is now redundant.
All Saints	Kirk Hallam; 52.9604°N 1.3188°W		Although the church dates from the 14th century, two Norman beakheads have been preserved in the porch. The church was restored in 1859 by G. E. Street. The font has a Norman circular tub set on a 19th-century base. In the chancel are a Decorated sedilia and piscina. A window on the north side of the nave was designed by Bernard Sleigh.
Holy Trinity	Kirk Ireton; 53.0485°N 1.6002°W		Dating from the 12th century with later additions and alterations; the lower part of the tower, the south doorway and the nave arcades are Norman. The church was restored in 1873. The chancel arch is Perpendicular.
St Michael	Kirk Langley; 52.9463°N 1.5752°W		The church was built in the early 14th century, with alterations later in that century and in the 16th century. It was restored in 1839, and again in 1885, this time by Bodley and Garner.
St Michael	Kniveton; 53.0504°N 1.6881°W		This a small church dating from the 12th century, with a Norman south doorway. The church was restored in 1870, and the vestry was added in 1907. Inside the church is a 13th-century font, and a monument dating from 1779.
St Chad	Longford; 52.9419°N 1.6818°W		St Chad's dates from the 12th century, with Norman features remaining in the arcades. The aisles date from the early 14th century, and the clerestory and west tower from the following century. The church contains monuments to the Longford family of nearby Longford Hall, the earliest dating from 1357.
All Saints	Mackworth; 52.9362°N 1.5250°W		The church stands in an isolated position in fields. It dates from the early 14th century, with alterations during the following century, and a restoration in 1851. It has a west tower with a recessed spire containing lucarnes. Much of the architecture is Perpendicular. Inside the church is lavish alabaster decoration dating from the Victorian era and later.
St Mary	Marston on Dove; 52.8637°N 1.6551°W		St Mary's originated in the 13th century, with alterations and additions in the early 14th, and the 15th centuries. The church was restored during the 19th century. It has a west tower with a spire, and north and south aisles. The font is plain, deep and circular, and dates possibly from the 11th century. There are fragments of 15th-century stained glass in the north aisle windows. One of the bells is dated 1366.
St Michael and St Mary	Melbourne; 52.8211°N 1.4243°W		There is evidence of a church on the site in the Domesday Book, but the present church originates from about 1133, and was not completed until the 13th century. There were alterations in the 15th century, and the tower was heightened in 1602. George Gilbert Scott restored the church between 1859 and 1862. It has a cruciform plan with a tower at the crossing. The font consists of a 12th-century circular bowl carried on four columns and a central stem. In the south transept is a 14th-century niche containing an effigy.
St Matthew	Morley; 52.9643°N 1.4109°W		The church dates from the 12th century, and has retained Norman features in the south nave arcade. The chancel and south porch were added in the early 14th century. There were further additions in the late 14th and in the 15th centuries. The church is also notable for its monuments, which date from the 15th century, and for its stained glass, much of which was moved here from Dale Abbey. There are original floor tiles in the north chancel chapel that was built in about 1370.
St Mary and St Barlok	Norbury Hollow; 52.9788°N 1.8147°W		Originating in the 12th century, alterations were made in the 14th and 15th centuries, and the church was restored in 1841 and again in 1899. The tower stands in the centre of the south side of the church, and is flanked by 15th-century chapels. The church is notable for the 14th-century glass in the chancel windows, and its alabaster tombs of the Fitzherbert family dating from the 15th century.
St Lawrence	North Wingfield; 53.1757°N 1.3961°W		The church dates from the 12th century, with some remaining Norman features, in particular the east window in the north transept. The tall west tower is Perpendicular, as are the aisle windows. Alterations were made in the 19th century, including rebuilding the south aisle in 1860, a restoration of the north aisle and clerestory in 1872 by S. Rollinson, and a more general restoration in 1878–80 by R. H. Carpenter. Inside the church are many monuments, the oldest dating from the 13th century.
St Matthew	Pentrich; 53.0690°N 1.4202°W		Dating from the 12th century, additions and amendments were made to St Matthew's in the late 14th and early 15th centuries. The church was restored in 1859. It has a west tower, and contains a Romanesque baptismal font on a pedestal dated 1662.
St Andrew	Radbourne; 52.9206°N 1.5761°W		St Andrew's stands close to the grounds of Radbourne Hall. It dates from the 13th century with later alterations and additions. The battlemented tower is sited at the northwest of the church. In the church are monuments to members of the Pole family of Radbourne Hall, the earliest dating from the 15th century, and the most impressive being dated 1684.
St Wystan	Repton; 52.8412°N 1.5516°W		The major feature of the church is its complete Anglo-Saxon crypt, which dates from the early 8th century. The aisles were built in the 13th century, and widened in the following century. The west tower and spire were completed in 1340. The clerestory and two-storey porch date from the 15th century. In 1854 the church was restored by Arthur Blomfield. Inside the church is the alabaster effigy of a knight dating from about 1400.
St Giles	Sandiacre; 52.9307°N 1.2873°W		This church originated in the 11th century, and has retained a Norman doorway, chancel arch, and two windows. In the 14th century the chancel in Decorated style was added; this is taller than the nave, and almost as long. Between these the west tower, with its broach spire, was added. The church was restored twice in the 19th century. The font dates from the 14th century, and has a 20th-century cover. The oldest monument in the church is a 13th-century gravestone.
All Saints	Sawley; 52.8777°N 1.2995°W		The church dates from the 11th century. It has a Norman chancel arch, and a very wide nave. It was altered in the 13th and 14th centuries, with a clerestory and a steeple with lucarnes were added in the 15th century. The church was restored in 1889. Inside the church are two re-set 13th-century effigies, monuments from the 15th century, and a pulpit with a tester dated 1636.
St James	Smisby; 52.7687°N 1.4857°W		St James originated in 1068 as a chapel of ease; this is now the south aisle. The nave and chancel were added in the 14th century, and the tower in the later part of the following century. The church was restored in the 1890s. Inside the church are monuments, the oldest dating from the 14th century.
St Michael	Stanton by Bridge; 52.8406°N 1.4561°W		The church originated in the 11th century, was partly rebuilt in 1682, and restored in 1865.
All Saints	Steetley, Whitwell; 53.3027°N 1.1858°W		Essentially still a small Norman chapel, All Saints originated in the 12th century, and has been little altered since, other than a restoration by J. Loughborough Pearson in 1876–80. It consists of a nave with a south porch, and a chancel with a semicircular apse, and measures 52 feet (16 m) by 15 feet (5 m). At the east end of the nave is a single gabled bellcote. Inside the church, between the nave and the chancel, is a decorated semicircular arch.
St Andrew	Twyford; 52.8535°N 1.5152°W		Originating in the 12th century, alterations were made in the next two centuries. The nave was rebuilt in the 18th century, using medieval masonry encased in brick. The tower and chancel are in sandstone. The tower has an embattled parapet, and is surmounted by a short octagonal spire with lucarnes. Inside the church, the chancel arch is Norman, and there are traces of painted scenes above it.
St Michael	Taddington; 53.2373°N 1.7898°W		The church dates from the 14th century. It was restored in 1891 by Naylor and Sale of Derby. The church is constructed in limestone with lead roofs. It has a west steeple, and there are remnants of paintings on its west wall.
St Leonard	Thorpe; 53.0485°N 1.7683°W		Dating from the early 12th century, the church has a Norman west tower, Norman masonry in the walls of the nave, and a Norman font. The church is constructed in limestone with sandstone dressings. In the chancel is a tomb chest dating from 1632.
St John the Baptist	Tideswell; 53.2788°N 1.7726°W		St John's dates from the 14th century, and was restored in 1873 by J. D. Sedding. Parts of it are in Decorated style, and other parts are Perpendicular. On the summit of the west tower are smaller octagonal towers at the corners, each of which is surmounted by a crocketed pinnacle. On top of the chancel arch is a bellcote. The stained glass in the east window, by Heaton, Butler and Bayne, depicts the Tree of Jesse.
Padley Chapel	Upper Padley, Grindleford; 53.3070°N 1.6312°W		This was originally a gatehouse chapel to Padley Manor, and dates from the 14th and 15th centuries. After the manor was demolished in the 17th century the gatehouse was used as barn. In the 1930s it was repaired and has since been used as a Roman Catholic chapel. In 2006 the building was damaged by lightning.
St Mary	Weston-on-Trent; 52.8444°N 1.4111°W		The church dates from the 13th century, with alterations and additions during the following two centuries. It was restored in 1876–77 by Jolley and Evans. It has a west tower with a thin octagonal spire containing two tiers of lucarnes. Inside the church is a triple 13th-century sedilia, a 14th-century piscina, an octagonal pulpit from the 17th century, and a font dated 1661. There are also monuments from the 17th century.
All Saints	Weston Underwood; 52.9825°N 1.5795°W		The earliest fabric in the church dates from the 11th century, with alterations and additions in the following four centuries and in the 18th century.
St Lawrence	Whitwell; 53.2858°N 1.2122°W		The church originates from the 12th century, with additions and amendments in the 13th, 14th and 19th centuries.
All Saints	Wingerworth; 53.2028°N 1.4278°W		Dating from the early 12th century, All Saints was altered during each of the following three centuries. An extension was added in 1963–64 comprising a new nave at right angles to the north of the existing north aisle. As previously built the church included a west tower, and a mausoleum to the northeast. Inside the church are 12th-century paintings depicting Christ and four saints, and there are traces of wall painting elsewhere. At the east end of the chancel is the inset effigy of a priest dating from about 1200.
St Mary	Wirksworth; 53.0819°N 1.5723°W		St Mary's is a cruciform church, and has a tower at the crossing with a small spire. The church was restored in 1870 by George Gilbert Scott. Its contents include a Saxon coffin lid. The church has also maintained the annual tradition of clipping the church.
All Saints	Youlgreave; 53.1760°N 1.6842°W		Dating from the 12th century, there were alterations and additions in the 14th, 15th and 16th centuries. The church was restored in 1869–70 by Norman Shaw. Norman features are still present in the aisles. In the church are a number of memorials, the earliest containing the 14th-century effigy of a knight. The font is Norman, and moved here from another church.
