= Smalley, Derbyshire =

Coordinates: 52.998°N 1.394°W

Smalley
- Civil parish
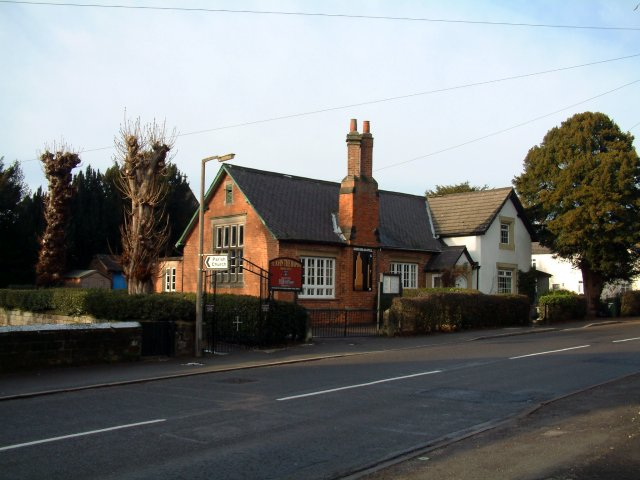
- Church Hall, Smalley.

- Location within Derbyshire
- Interactive map of Smalley
- Area: 2.71 sq mi (7.0 km^{2})
- Population: 2,784 (2011)
  - Density: 1,027/sq mi (397/km^{2})
- OS grid reference: SK407446
- District: Amber Valley
- Shire county: Derbyshire
- Region: East Midlands
- Country: England
- Sovereign state: United Kingdom
- Settlements: Smalley: Heanor Gate; Smalley Green; Woodside
- Post town: ILKESTON
- Postcode district: DE7
- Dialling code: 01332 + 01773
- Police: Derbyshire
- Fire: Derbyshire
- Ambulance: East Midlands
- Website: smalleyparishcouncil.co.uk

Smalley is a village on the main A608 Heanor to Derby road in Derbyshire in the East Midlands of England. The population of the civil parish as of the 2011 census was 2,784.

Smalley is part of the borough of Amber Valley and has its own parish council. Smalley village is central west within the wider parish area which contains other villages - Heanor Gate to the far north which merges into the town of Heanor, Smalley Green south of Smalley and Woodside to the far south. Facilities in the area include a primary school at Smalley, and a college and industrial estate at Heanor Gate.

== History ==
Smalley's name came from the Anglo-Saxon Smæl-lēah = "narrow woodland clearing". It was mentioned in a charter of 1009 by King Æþelræd Unræd ("Ethelred the Unready") relating to a manor known as Westune (modern-day Weston-on-Trent) which land included the areas now known as Shardlow, Great Wilne, Church Wilne, Crich, Smalley, Morley, Weston and Aston-on-Trent. Under this charter Ethelred gave his minister, Morcar, some exemptions from tax.

Smalley's Parish Church of St John the Baptist was built in the late 18th century on the site of a much earlier church, the transepts being added later in 1844. A seventh century Saxon cross forms part of the porch. The bell tower was built in 1911, to the designs of Currey and Thompson, housing five bells donated by the Rev. Charles Kerry. The chime of five bells is said to be the heaviest in England, the largest bell weighing over 2 tons. The parish church hosts occasional street parties for the residents of Smalley.

Its pub, the Bell Inn, was voted "Best Derbyshire Pub of 2006".

== Sport and leisure ==
=== Cricket ===
Stainsby Hall Cricket Club have their ground at the end of St. John's Road in Smalley and have been playing in the Derbyshire County League since the mid-1930s. The club takes its name from the now-demolished Stainsby House just over the parish border in Horsley Woodhouse a few hundred yards from their current ground, and records show that the club played in front of the old house from as early as 1863.

Stainsby Hall Cricket Club currently have three senior teams competing in the Derbyshire County Cricket League and a long-established junior training section that play competitive cricket in the Erewash Young Cricketers League.

== See also ==
- Listed buildings in Smalley, Derbyshire
