= Listed buildings in Horsley, Derbyshire, and Horsley Woodhouse =

Horsley and Horsley Woodhouse are civil parishes in the Amber Valley district of Derbyshire, England. The parishes contain eight listed buildings that are recorded in the National Heritage List for England. Of these, one is listed at Grade I, the highest of the three grades, and the others are at Grade II, the lowest grade. The parishes contain the villages of Horsley and Horsley Woodhouse and the surrounding area. The listed buildings consist of a church, a cottage, a farmhouse and farm buildings, the remains of buildings in the garden of a demolished house, a milepost, a water fountain, and a former post box.

== Key ==
Grade	Criteria
I	Buildings of exceptional interest, sometimes considered to be internationally important
II	Buildings of national importance and special interest

== Buildings ==
Name and location	Photograph	Date	Notes	Grade
St Clement's Church; 52.99654°N 1.44210°W		Early 14th century	The church has been altered and extended through the centuries, and it was restored in 1858–60. It is built in sandstone with lead roofs, and consists of a nave with a clerestory, north and south aisles, a south porch, a chancel, and a west steeple. The steeple has a tower with three stages, angle buttresses with gableted tops, a southwest stair turret, a south doorway, two-light bell openings, a moulded cornice, corner gargoyles, and a broach spire with two tiers of lucarnes. The body of the church has embattled parapets and crocketed pinnacles.	I
Grange Cottage; 52.98952°N 1.44305°W		Mid 18th century	A sandstone house with a coved eaves band, and a tile roof with moulded gable copings. There are two storeys and attics, and two bays. The doorway to the right has a quoined surround, there is another doorway in the left return, and the windows are mullioned with casements.	II
Castle Farmhouse; 52.98420°N 1.44446°W	—	Early 19th century	The farmhouse is in sandstone, the main part has a roof of Welsh slate with overhanging eaves, and the wing has a tile roof. There are two storeys, the main part has three bays, and to the west is a lower single-bay wing. In the centre is a doorway with a porch, most of the windows are sashes with channelled wedge lintels, and there is one casement window.	II
Farm buildings, Castle Farm; 52.98442°N 1.44493°W	—	Early 19th century	The farm buildings are in sandstone with hipped slate roofs. There are two storeys and an L-shaped plan, consisting of two ranges, together with walls enclosing a yard. The buildings contain sliding doors, and windows, and in the upper floor are blocked hayloft openings. At the rear is a wide segmental arch.	II
Garden wall and towers, Stainsby House; 52.99358°N 1.39957°W	—	Early 19th century	The remains of the towers are in red brick with sandstone dressings, dentilled eaves bands, and conical slate roofs. Each tower contains a segmental-headed doorway with a segmental-headed window above. Between the towers is a doorway with a triangular-headed pediment, and attached to the north and south of them are coped garden walls.	II
Milepost; 53.00071°N 1.44402°W		c. 1840	The milepost is on the west side of Derby Road (B6179 road). It is in cast iron, and has a triangular plan and a rounded top plate. The plate is inscribed with the distance to London, and on the side panels are the distances to Derby, Burton upon Trent, Alfreton, and Chesterfield, with some of the names abbreviated.	II
Sophia Water Fountain; 52.99643°N 1.44058°W		1869	The water fountain, which was funded by Sacheverell Sitwell, is in sandstone. It consists of a square pier about 5 feet (1.5 m) high, on a stepped chamfered base, and there is an infilled circular basin on the east side. On each side is a panel with a pointed head with a moulded hood and a foliage finial. In the eastern panel is a lion's head spout and an inscription, the north and south panels have corbels, and in the west panel is a lion rampant. Over each panel is a gabled roof.	II
Old Post Box; 52.99611°N 1.43842°W		1869	The post box is in Coxbench sandstone, and consists of a tall square pillar with a triangular coped top. On the east side is a small opening covered by an inscribed plaque.	II
