= Horsley Woodhouse =

Village in Derbyshire, England

Coordinates: 52.99996°N 1.41139°W

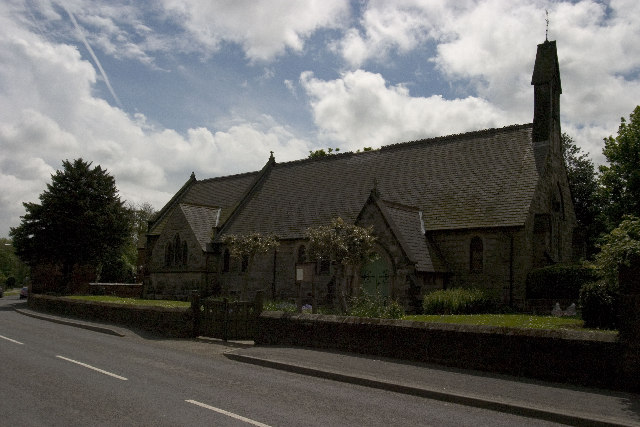
- St Susanna's Church
- Population: 1,219 2011 Census
- OS grid reference: SK396449
- Civil parish: Horsley Woodhouse
- District: Amber Valley
- Shire county: Derbyshire
- Region: East Midlands
- Country: England
- Sovereign state: United Kingdom
- Post town: ILKESTON
- Postcode district: DE7
- Dialling code: 01332
- Police: Derbyshire
- Fire: Derbyshire
- Ambulance: East Midlands
- UK Parliament: Amber Valley
- Website: www.horsley-woodhouse.co.uk

Horsley Woodhouse is a village and civil parish in the Amber Valley district of Derbyshire, in the East Midlands of England. The population of the civil parish taken at the 2011 Census was 1,219. It is situated on the A609 road between the neighbouring villages of Kilburn and Smalley. The nearest towns are Heanor, situated 2.6 miles (4.2 km) northeast, and Belper, 3.2 miles (5.1 km) northwest, while the city of Derby is located about 6 miles (9.7 km) south-southwest.

The name is said to mean "houses in the wood belonging to Horsley", and is often known by its dialect pronunciation "Ossley Woodhus".

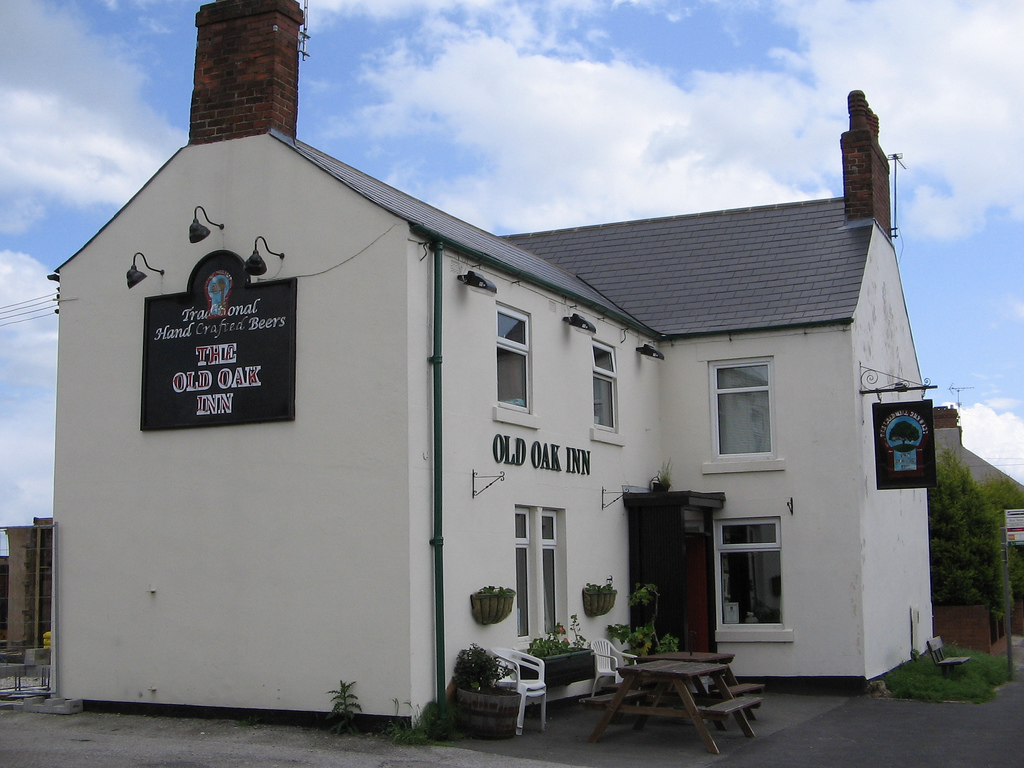
The Old Oak pub

== Carnival ==
Each year in July the village hosts a carnival with a parade of floats from the Medical Centre to the showground at the Sitwell Recreation Ground. A prize, the Twins Cup, is awarded to the best float each year. The winner in 2010 was the Pirate Ship created by the Stainsby Avenue residents. The prize was split in 2011 between the Stainsby Avenue residents' Circus float, and the Pre-School's Royal Wedding float. The carnival showground features rides and sideshows and is also the venue for the Amber Valley Marching Bands Contest.

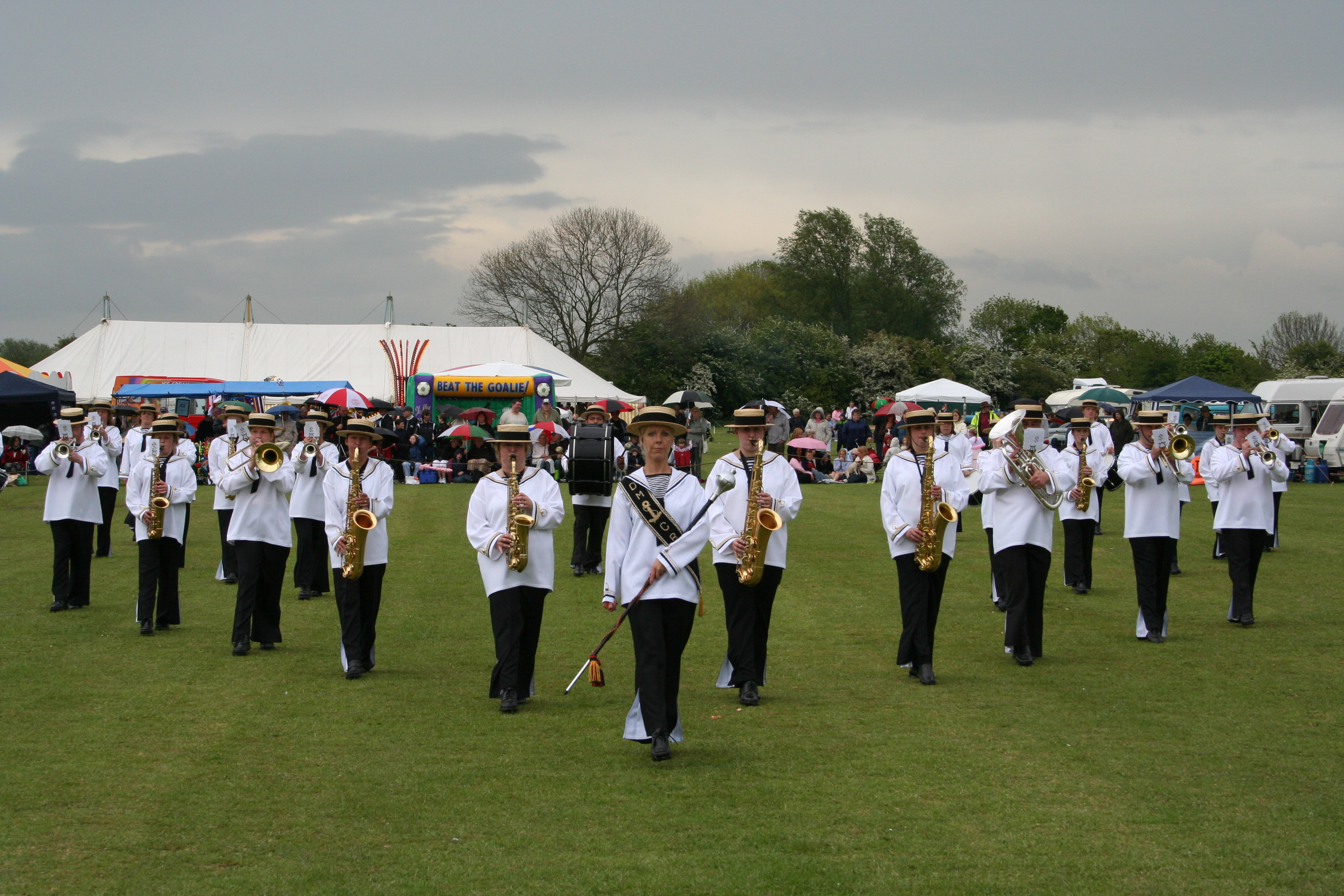
Derby Midshipmen Band

Derby Midshipmen Band

== Amenities ==
The village currently has two operating pubs, The Old Oak Inn on the main village street, and the Sitwell Arms in the hamlet of Woodside. Another pub, The Jolly Colliers, is now closed and was converted into private houses, as was the Knife and Steel pub, which closed several years ago.

Also in the village until 2017 was the Ex-servicemen's and Working Men's Club, a private club which held entertainment such as live bands, discos, quiz nights and bingo, before its demolition and replacement in 2017 with a shop.

== Notable buildings ==
To the south-east of the village, almost in Smalley but still within Horsley Woodhouse parish, was Stainsby House. Built in the 1780s, by the end of the 18th century it had been acquired by the Wilmot-Sitwell family, relatives of the Sitwells of Renishaw Hall through George Sitwell. The Wilmot-Sitwells were benefactors to the villages of Horsley Woodhouse, Horsley, Smalley and Morley: the present Church Hall in Horsley Woodhouse was originally built as a school in 1869 by the family. Once the Wilmot-Sitwell line diminished, the house and lands were sold on. The house was requisitioned to accommodate St Aloysius' RC College until the 1950s, then later became a poultry farm. By the 1970s it had fallen into decay, and was ultimately demolished in 1974, by a wealthy new owner. The historic house was replaced with an aesthetically challenging 'futuristic' construction, which kept the original name of 'Stainsby House' and was completed in 1976. In the 1980s this building featured as a film location for the BBC television production of Life and Loves of a She Devil.

Hollies Farm in the centre of the village was built in the late 17th century and was used as a tannery for many years by the Richardson family. This family later moved the business to Derby and eventually to the Eagle Tannery in Sinfin. Hollies Farm has since been demolished, replaced with a street of houses named Hollies Farm Drive.

St Susanna's church was erected in 1882. A stained-glass window was given by the Wilmot-Sitwells.

== See also ==
- Listed buildings in Horsley, Derbyshire, and Horsley Woodhouse
