= All Saints' Church, Steetley =

Coordinates: 53°18′9.21″N 1°11′9.26″W

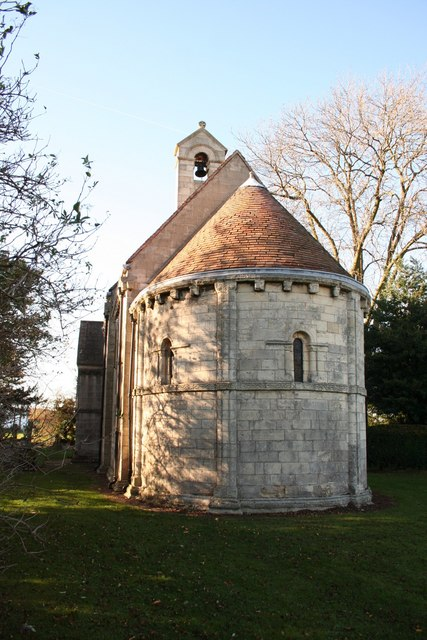
- All Saints' Church, Steetley (photograph by Richard Croft)
- All Saints' Church, Steetley
- Location: Whitwell, Derbyshire
- Country: England
- Denomination: Church of England

History
- Dedication: All Saints

Architecture
- Heritage designation: Grade I listed

Administration
- Diocese: Diocese of Derby
- Archdeaconry: Chesterfield
- Deanery: Bolsover and Staveley
- Parish: Whitwell

All Saints' Church, Steetley is a Grade I listed parish church in the Church of England in Whitwell, Derbyshire.

== History ==
The church dates from the 12th century with elements from the 13th century. It was roofless from the 16th century until 1879 when the Revd. G. E. Mason started a restoration. It was restored in 1879–1880 by John Loughborough Pearson.

== Parish status ==
The church is in a joint parish with

- St Lawrence's Church, Whitwell

== Organ ==
The pipe organ was installed by Cousins in 1973. A specification of the organ can be found on the National Pipe Organ Register. It has now been replaced with an electronic organ.

== See also ==
- Grade I listed churches in Derbyshire
- Grade I listed buildings in Derbyshire
- Listed buildings in Whitwell, Derbyshire
