= Hodthorpe =

Village in Derbyshire, England

Coordinates: 53°17′N 1°11′W

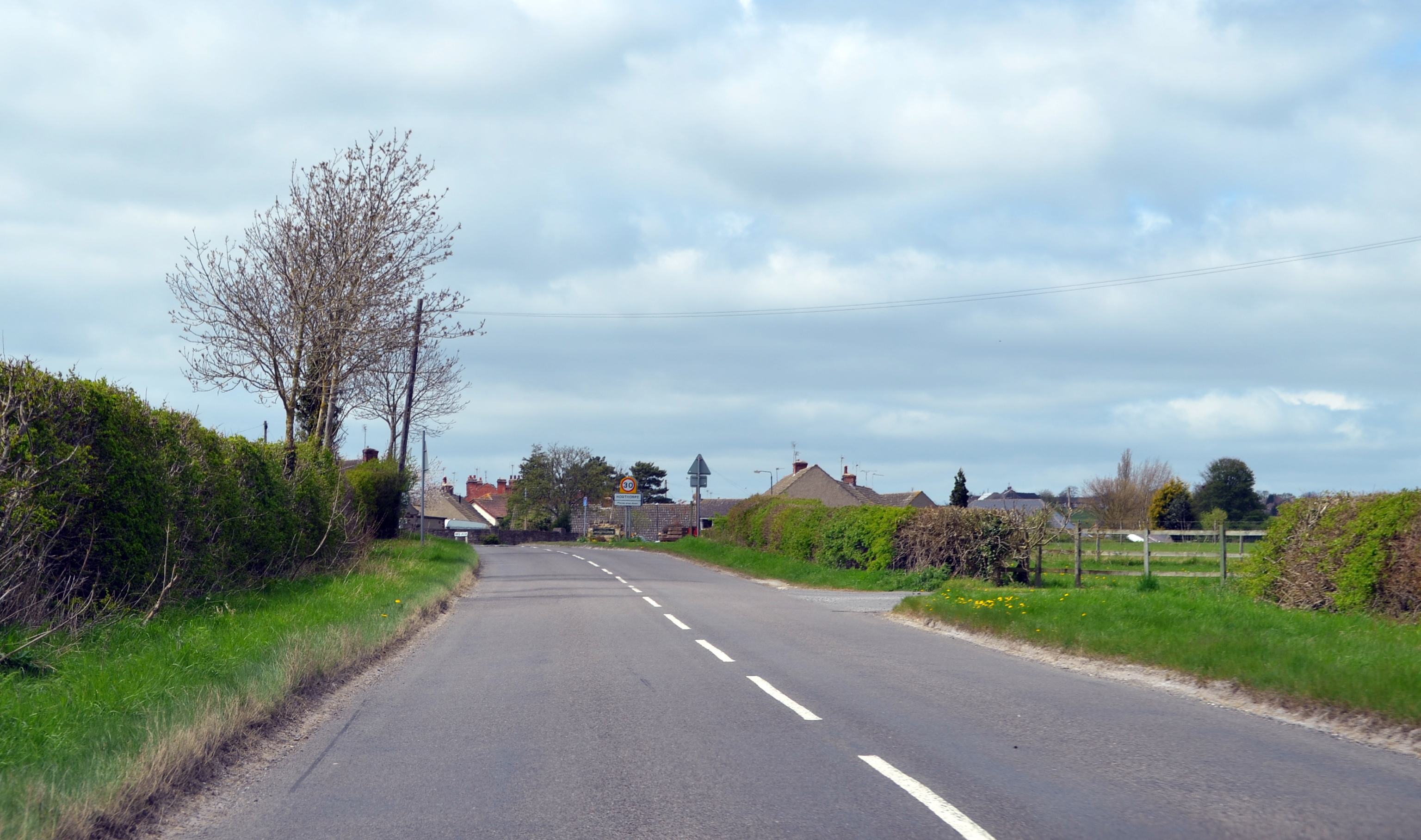
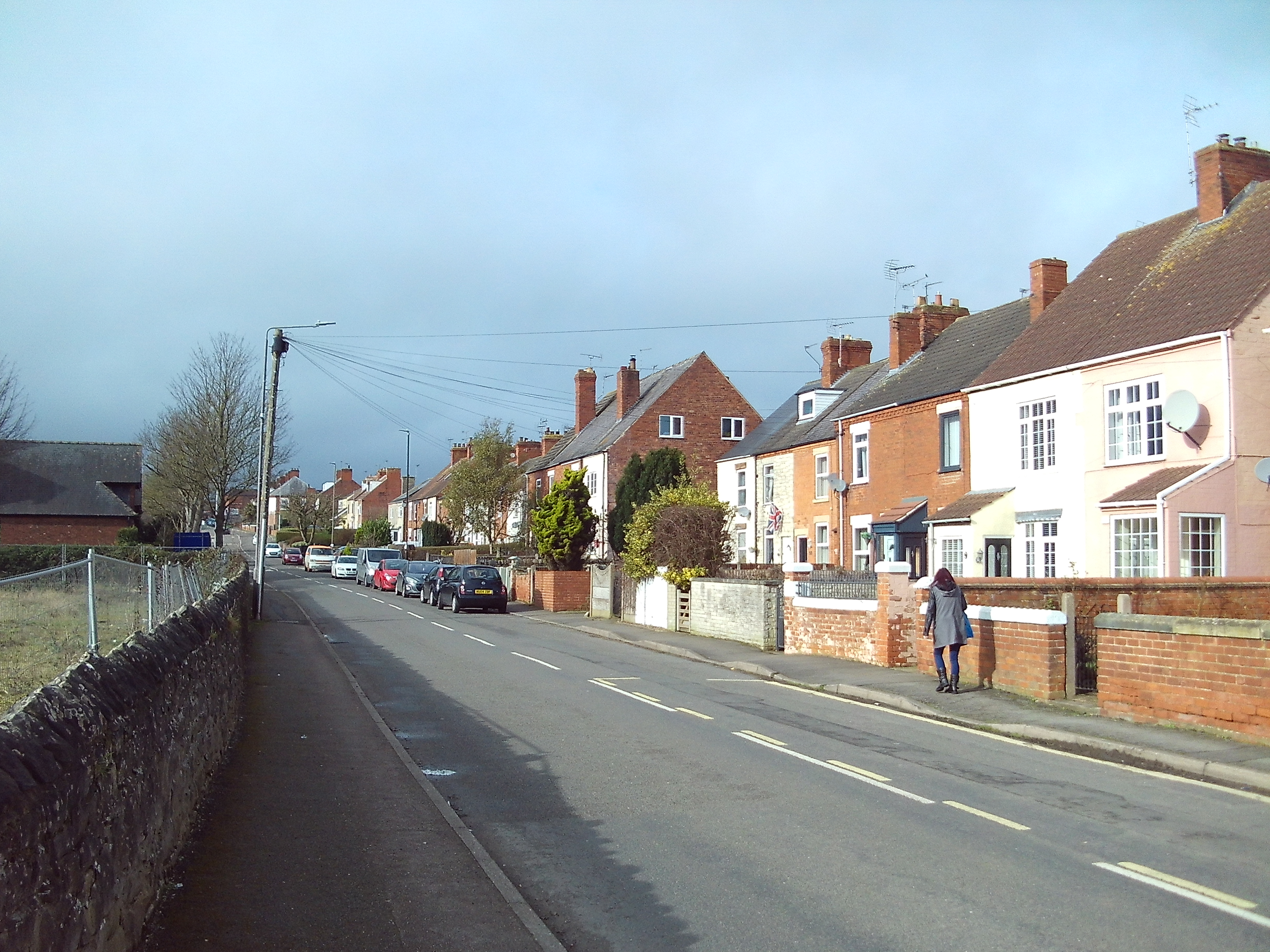
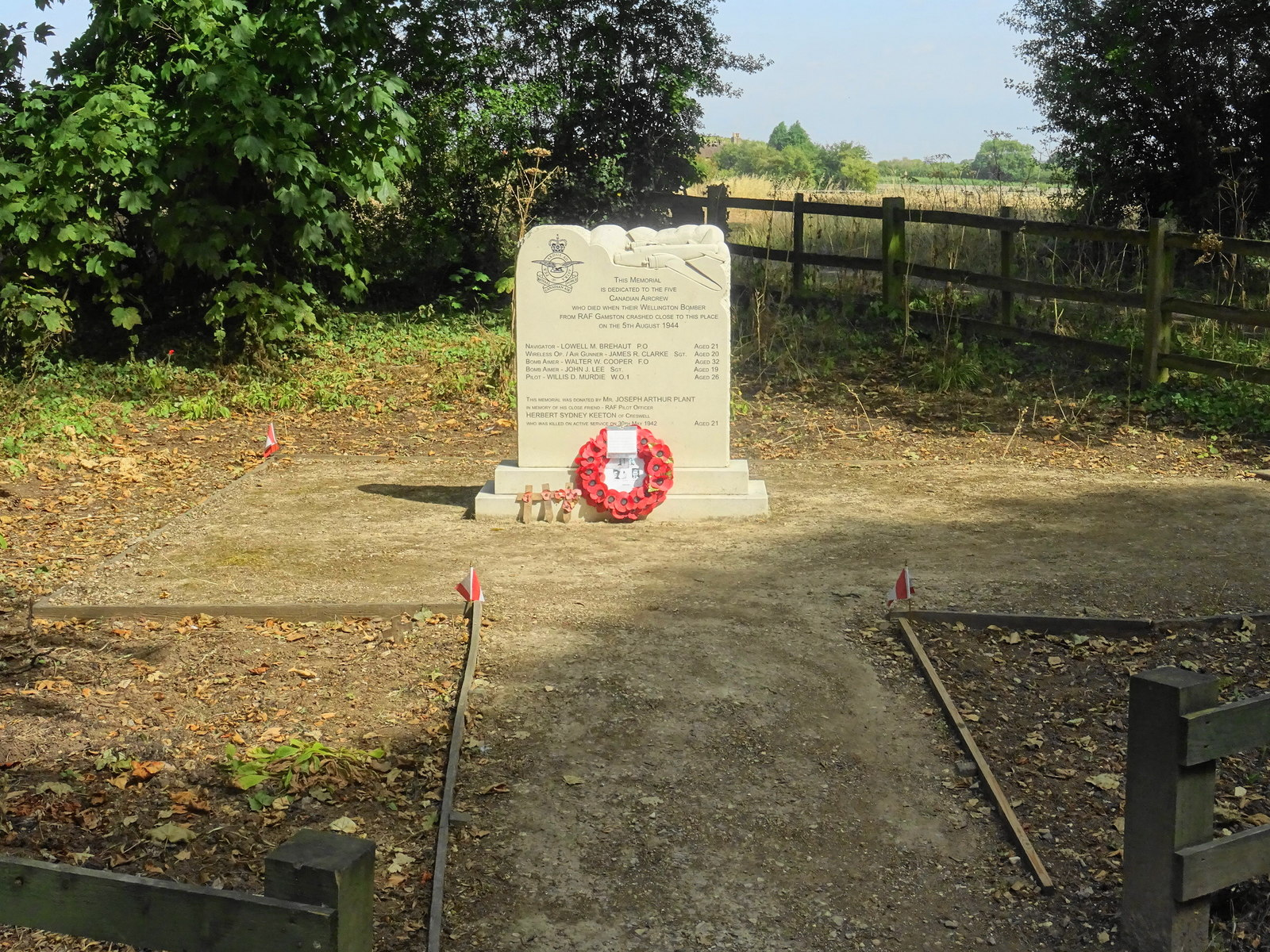
- Broad Lane Queens Road Canadian Aircrew Memorial
- Population: 663 (2011)
- Shire county: Derbyshire
- Region: East Midlands
- Country: England
- Sovereign state: United Kingdom
- Post town: Worksop
- Postcode district: S80
- Police: Derbyshire
- Fire: Derbyshire
- Ambulance: East Midlands

Hodthorpe is an urban village in the parish of Hodthorpe and Belph, Bolsover, Derbyshire, lying close to the Nottinghamshire border and on the edge of Sherwood Forest. The village has two principal streets, Queens Road (the main road running through the village) and Kings Street. It has one shop, a village primary school, and a Working Men's club. There are three parks.

The heritage site of Creswell Crags, famous for its prehistoric cave art, lies close to the village.

== Toponymy and history ==
The village gets its name from John Hoddings, who planned the village, "Hod" coming from "Hoddings", and "thorpe" Anglo-Saxon for village.

The village was founded in 1804, following the first sinking of mine shafts at neighbouring Whitwell. There was great resentment in Whitwell at this time to the influx of coal miners, and so the Welbeck Abbey estate agreed to Hodthorpe's foundation. The village was on the local branch railway line, with its own (now disused) halt.

Until the 1890s the Wesleyan (Methodist) chapel (1834) was the only place of worship in the village. Eventually the local miners raised money to build the Anglican chapel of St. Martin in 1897, known as the ‘Tin Chapel’. These have both since closed. The Methodist chapel, closed circa 1960, has since become a metal-works, while the Anglican chapel and its village hall were demolished in 1995, the land sold off and redeveloped as apartments.

The C.of.E. Junior & Infants School was built on Queens Road, the official opening being carried out by the 6th Duke of Portland on Tuesday, January 17, 1905.

The Cheshire Horse Artillery had stables on the south side of Queens Road, the location being chosen because of the nearby stud farm at Welbeck Abbey. These stables were bombed during the Second World War.
