= Listed buildings in Whitwell, Derbyshire =

Whitwell is a civil parish in the Bolsover District of Derbyshire, England. The parish contains 15 listed buildings that are recorded in the National Heritage List for England. Of these, two are listed at Grade I, the highest of the three grades, one is at Grade II*, the middle grade, and the others are at Grade II, the lowest grade. The parish contains the village of Whitwell and the surrounding area. The listed buildings include churches, houses, farmhouses and farm buildings, a public house, a village pump, and a war memorial.

== Key ==
Grade	Criteria
I	Buildings of exceptional interest, sometimes considered to be internationally important
II*	Particularly important buildings of more than special interest
II	Buildings of national importance and special interest

== Buildings ==
Name and location	Photograph	Date	Notes	Grade
All Saints' Church, Steetley; 53.30268°N 1.18582°W		12th century	The church, which is in Norman style, was restored in 1880 by J. L. Pearson. It is built in sandstone with a tile roof, and consists of a nave with a south porch, a lower chancel, and a semicircular apse. The church has a moulded plinth, a corbel table with carved figures, and a gabled bellcote at the east end of the nave. The gabled porch has four orders of colonnettes, with medallions, foliage scrolls, and zigzag and beakhead decoration.	I
St Lawrence's Church, Whitwell; 53.28585°N 1.21214°W		12th century	The church has been altered and extended during the centuries, and contains Norman and Decorated features. It is built in stone with roofs of lead and Welsh slate, and consists of a nave with a clerestory, north and south aisles, north and south transepts, a chancel with a north vestry, and a west tower. The tower has two stages, diagonal buttresses, a 12th-century west doorway with one order of colonnettes, leaf capitals and zigzag decoration, and above it is a 12th-century round-arched window with a hood mould. On the south side is a clock face, the bell openings have two lights, and at the top is an embattled parapet with crocketed corner pinnacles.	I
North Walls Farmhouse; 53.29401°N 1.24863°W		17th century	The farmhouse is in sandstone with quoins, and a roof partly hipped, and partly with coped gables and plain kneelers. There are two storeys. The south front is symmetrical with four bays, a central doorway with a moulded hood mould, and casement windows. The east front is irregular, with four bays, and contains a doorway with a segmental arch within a moulded square frame, and a keystone. Most of the windows on this front are mullioned.	II
The Old Manor House; 53.28517°N 1.21141°W	—	17th century	The farmhouse is in sandstone on a plinth, with quoins, and a Welsh slate roof with stone coped gables and moulded kneelers. There are two storeys, and a hall range with flanking cross-wings. The central doorway has a moulded surround and half-columns, the windows are sashes with wedge stone lintels, and there is a staircase window. On the garden front is a gabled bay window.	II
Whitwell Hall; 53.28660°N 1.21228°W	—	17th century	A manor house in sandstone on a chamfered plinth, with quoins, and a roof of stone slate and tile with stone coped gables, moulded kneelers and finials. There are two storeys and attics, and most of the windows are mullioned or mullioned and transomed. The garden front has seven irregular bays, and contains a canted oriel window. The east front has five bays, and contains a doorway with a moulded round-arched entrance and a pierced parapet, and gabled half-dormers.	II*
Steetley Farmhouse; 53.30342°N 1.18484°W		18th century	The farmhouse is in sandstone, and has a stone slate roof with coped gables and plain kneelers. There are two storeys and four bays. The doorway has a plain surround and the windows are casements. Attached on the left are outbuildings with a pantile roof, various openings and external steps.	II
The Old George Inn; 53.28539°N 1.21069°W		18th century	A coaching inn, later divided into flats, it is in sandstone on a plinth, with sill bands and a hipped Welsh slate roof. There are two storeys and a symmetrical front of four bays. The central doorway has a moulded surround, a keystone and a hood mould. The windows are a mix of sashes and casements, and in the roof are three flat-roofed dormers.	II
44 High Street; 53.28558°N 1.21077°W		Early 19th century	Originally a farmhouse and barn under a continuous roof, it is in sandstone with a hipped pantile roof. The building is set at right angles to the road, and has two storeys, and a front of four bays. The doorway has a segmental-arched head, to the right is a former cart entrance, and the windows are sliding sashes.	II
Gipsyhill Farmhouse; 53.29486°N 1.23676°W		Early 19th century	The farmhouse is in sandstone with quoins, and a Welsh slate roof with decorative ridge cresting. There are two storeys and a symmetrical front of three bays. The central doorway has a moulded surround and a pedimented hood on moulded brackets, and the windows are sashes.	II
Barn, Steetley Farm; 53.30312°N 1.18486°W	—	Early 19th century	The barn is in sandstone with a pantile roof. It contains a central cart entrance and a doorway with stable-type doors, above are two square openings, and there are two tiers of slit vents.	II
Cart Hovel, Steetley Farm; 53.30311°N 1.18439°W	—	Early 19th century	The cart hovel is in sandstone with a pantile roof. In the centre bay is a pair of doors, and on each side are four bays of open cart entrances supported on square timber columns.	II
Pigeon house, Steetley Farm; 53.30295°N 1.18514°W	—	Early 19th century	The outbuilding containing a dovecote is in sandstone with a pantile roof. The dovecote is towards the left, it has a gabled roof, and contains doorways on three floors, with external steps leading to the middle door. In the gable is a rectangular louvred opening. To the left is a lean-to building with two doorways, and the range to the right contains doorways and windows, some blocked.	II
Village Pump; 53.28423°N 1.20685°W	—	19th century	The base of the pump is in sandstone, and consists of a plinth with two shallow steps. The pump is in cast iron, and is enclosed in a timber box with an overhanging top.	II
The Old Rectory; 53.28576°N 1.21337°W	—	1885	The rectory, later a private house, was designed by J. L. Pearson. It is in sandstone with floor bands, and a hipped, gabled and gambrel tile roof. There are two storeys and attics, and an irregular plan. The porch is gabled and has a Gothic doorway with a chamfered surround and a hood mould. There is a square bay window, and the other windows are mullioned, or mullioned and transomed.	II
War Memorial; 53.28452°N 1.20679°W		1924	The war memorial in the centre of The Square is in limestone. It has a hexagonal four-tiered plinth and a hexagonal pedestal, on which is a faceted column. At the top of the column are Gothic niches and a Celtic cross. On the sides of the pedestal are black marble plaques with inscriptions and the names of those lost in the two World Wars.	II
