= Listed buildings in Smalley, Derbyshire =

Smalley is a civil parish in the Amber Valley district of Derbyshire, England. The parish contains seven listed buildings that are recorded in the National Heritage List for England. Of these, one is listed at Grade II*, the middle of the three grades, and the others are at Grade II, the lowest grade. The parish contains the village of Smalley and the surrounding area, and the listed buildings consist of two large houses and associated structures, and a church.

== Key ==
Grade	Criteria
II*	Particularly important buildings of more than special interest
II	Buildings of national importance and special interest

== Buildings ==
Name and location	Photograph	Date	Notes	Grade
Smalley Hall and conservatory 52.99116°N 1.39459°W	—	18th century	The house was altered and enlarged in the late 19th century and in about 1902, it is in rendered brick with stone dressings, and has slate roofs. The earlier part is on a plinth, and has rusticated quoins and a moulded cornice. There are three storeys and four bays, a doorway with Ionic half-shafts, a pulvinated frieze and a triangular pediment with finials, and the windows are sashes with moulded surrounds. The later part has a floor band and a moulded cornice, two storeys and two bays, and canted bay windows. Beyond it is a conservatory, and the 1902 addition includes a tower.	II
Church of St John the Baptist; 52.99304°N 1.39601°W		1793	The church has been largely rebuilt, with the aisles added in 1844 and the porch in about 1850, the chancel was rebuilt in 1863, and the tower was added in 1912. The church is built in sandstone with a slate roof. It consists of a nave, north and south aisles, a south porch, a chancel, and an almost detached northwest tower. The tower is short, and has a west doorway with a segmental arch, a foundation stone, paired lancet windows with trefoil heads on the north and south fronts, and a splayed pyramidal tile roof.	II
Smalley Lodge; 52.99210°N 1.38157°W		1861	The lodge, designed by W. E. Nesfield, is in red brick, with stone dressings, bands in stone, blue and yellow brick, and a tile roof with stone coped gables, painted moulded kneelers, and ridge finials. There is a single storey and attics, and roughly a T-shaped plan. On the north front is a projecting gabled bay containing a bay window, to its right is a porch, and above it is a two-light casement window with a relieving arch containing decorative brickwork. In the west front is a three-light casement window, a two-light window above, both with relieving arches containing decorative brickwork, that in the ground floor with a plaque carved with a coat of arms. On the east front is a dated and initialled plaque.	II
Wall and well head, Smalley Lodge; 52.99210°N 1.38170°W		1861	The wall and well head were designed by W. E. Nesfield. The wall is in red brick with a stone balustrade consisting of tapered balusters and ridgeback copings. At the north end is an octagonal stone pier with moulded coping. To the east is the well head with a brick base, an oak rail on its top, and a timber superstructure carrying a conical slate roof with a lead finial.	II
Morley Manor; 52.97940°N 1.40499°W	—	1900	A large house, later used for other purposes, designed by G. F. Bodley in Tudor style. It is in sandstone, partly rendered, and has a simulated Cotswold slate roof with moulded stone copings to the gables and embattled parapets, and ball or steeple finials. There are two storeys and a U-shaped plan with a gated courtyard. On the main front is a two-storey gabled porch, the doorway with a moulded surround and a four-centred arch and a hood mould, flanked by pilasters with finials, with a coat of arms above. Outside the porch are embattled bay windows, and the other windows are mullioned and transomed.	II*
Garden steps, Morley Manor; 52.97927°N 1.40468°W	—	c. 1900	The steps in the garden to the south of the house are in sandstone. There are eight steps with Tudor-style balustrades, each ending is a square pier with a moulded base and cornice, and a ball finial.	II
Lodge, Morley Manor; 52.97809°N 1.40694°W	—	c. 1900	The lodge, designed by G. F. Bodley in Tudor style, is in sandstone, on a plinth, with a string course and a tile roof. There is a single storey and attics, and two bays. The doorway has a chamfered surround, and the windows are mullioned, two in gabled dormers.	II
