= St Clement's Church, Horsley =

Coordinates: 52°59′47.13″N 1°26′30.07″W

St Clement’s Church, Horsley
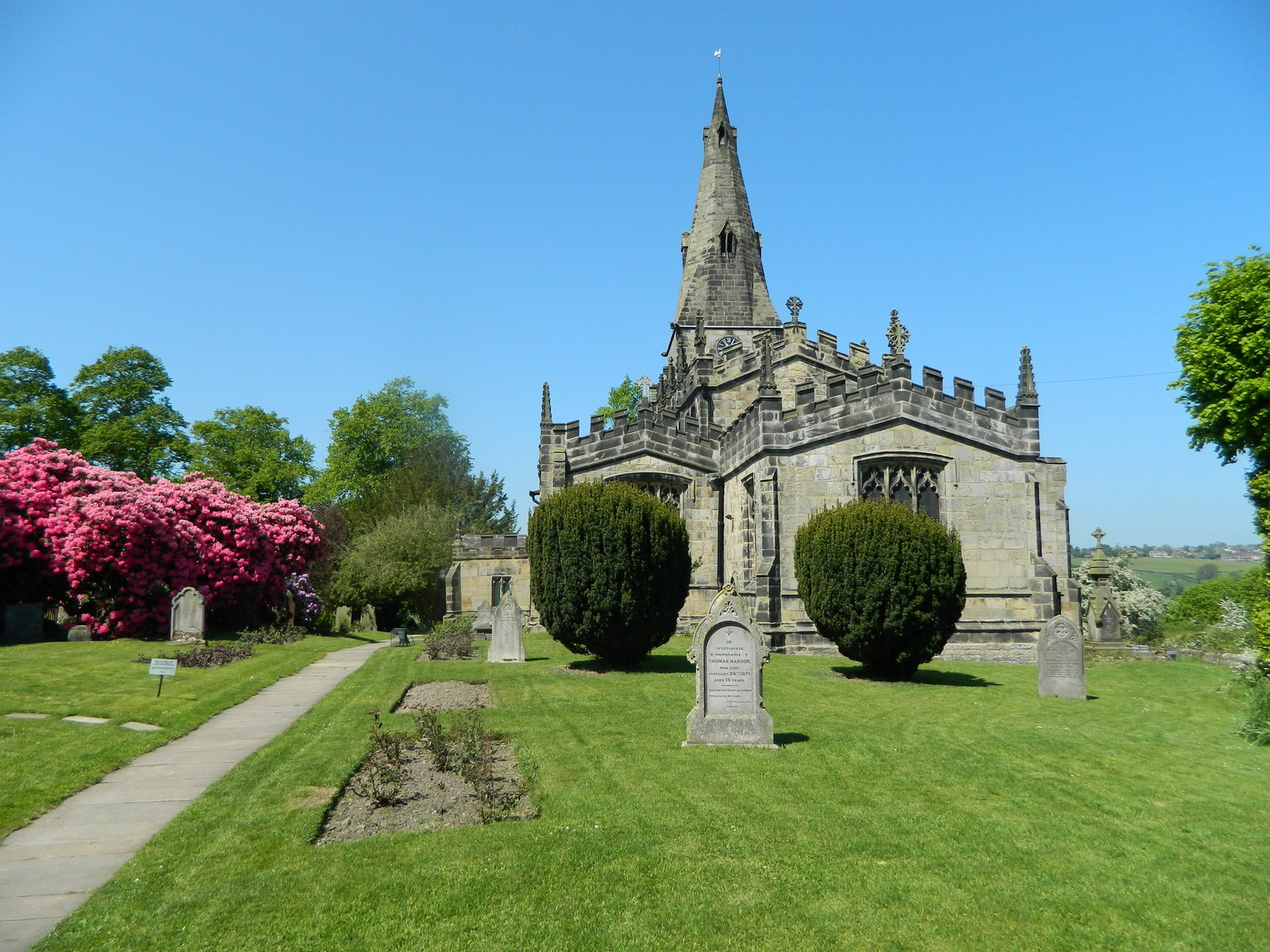
- St Clement’s Church, Horsley
- St Clement’s Church, Horsley
- Location: Horsley, Derbyshire
- Country: England
- Denomination: Church of England

History
- Dedication: St Clement

Architecture
- Heritage designation: Grade I listed

Administration
- Diocese: Diocese of Derby
- Archdeaconry: Derby
- Deanery: Heanor
- Parish: Horsley

St Clement's Church, Horsley is a Grade I listed parish church in the Church of England in Horsley, Derbyshire.

== History ==
The church dates from the 14th century. It was restored between 1858 and 1860 by the contractor Kerry and Allen of Smalley. It re-opened on 11 September 1860. A carved oak reredos was installed in 1928 and choir stalls in similar style were added in 1935.

== Parish status ==
The church is in a joint parish with

- St Mary the Virgin's Church, Denby
- Village Hall, Kilburn

== Organ ==
The pipe organ dates from 1895 and was built by Nicholson and Lord. A specification of the organ can be found on the National Pipe Organ Register.

== See also ==
- Grade I listed churches in Derbyshire
- Grade I listed buildings in Derbyshire
- Listed buildings in Horsley, Derbyshire, and Horsley Woodhouse
