= Roger Manners (died 1632) =

English politician

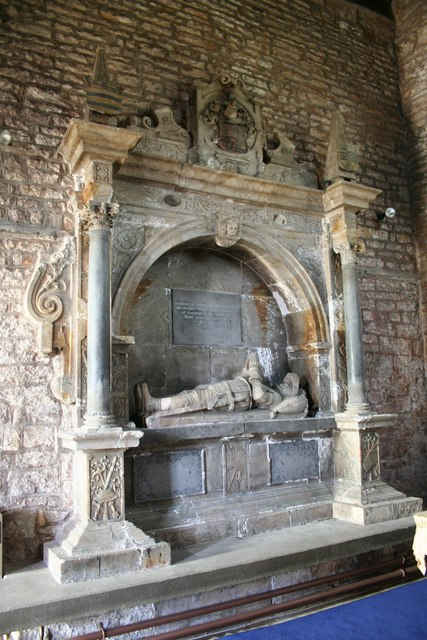
Memorial in St Lawrence's Church, Whitwell

Roger Manners (c. 1575 – 1632) was an English politician.

He was a member (MP) of the parliament of England for East Retford in 1601.

His memorial is in St Lawrence's Church, Whitwell.
