= St Lawrence's Church, Whitwell =

Coordinates: 53°17′9.98″N 1°12′43.9″W

St Lawrence’s Church, Whitwell
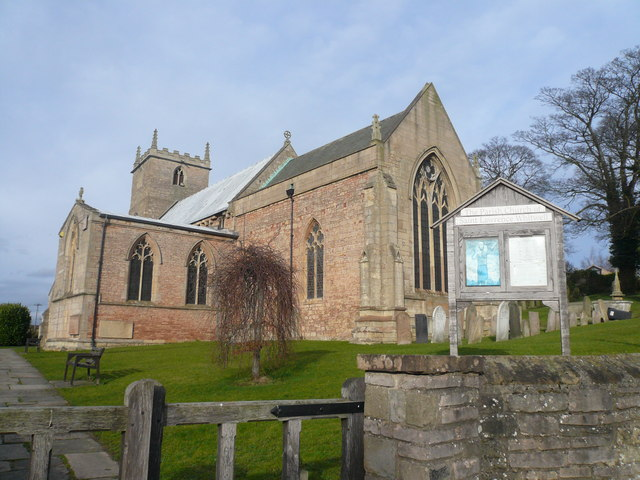
- St Lawrence’s Church, Whitwell (photograph by Alan Heardman)
- St Lawrence’s Church, Whitwell
- Location: Whitwell, Derbyshire
- Country: England
- Denomination: Church of England

History
- Dedication: St Lawrence

Architecture
- Heritage designation: Grade I listed

Administration
- Diocese: Diocese of Derby
- Archdeaconry: Chesterfield
- Deanery: Bolsover and Staveley
- Parish: Whitwell

St Lawrence's Church, Whitwell is a Grade I listed parish church in the Church of England in Whitwell, Derbyshire.

== History ==
The church dates from the 12th century with elements from the 13th and 14th centuries. It was restored in 1885–1886 by John Loughborough Pearson who added a new roof of pitch pine. The stonework was repointed and the walls replastered. The west end gallery was removed and the box pews were replaced with open sittings of pitch pine. The floor was paved with wooden blocks and a new heating apparatus by Bacon and Co of London was installed.

== Parish status ==
The church is in a joint parish with

- All Saints’ Church, Streetly

== Memorials ==
- Roger Manners (d. 1632)

== Organ ==
The organ was installed by Forster and Andrews dating from 1872. A specification of the organ can be found on the National Pipe Organ Register.

== Clock ==
Mr A Stinson was given the contract to install a new clock, and he employed Gillett & Johnston of Croydon. The new clock was started on 26 October 1890.

== See also ==
- Grade I listed churches in Derbyshire
- Grade I listed buildings in Derbyshire
- Listed buildings in Whitwell, Derbyshire
