= Horsley, Derbyshire =

Village in Derbyshire, England

Coordinates: 52.996°N 1.434°W

Horsley
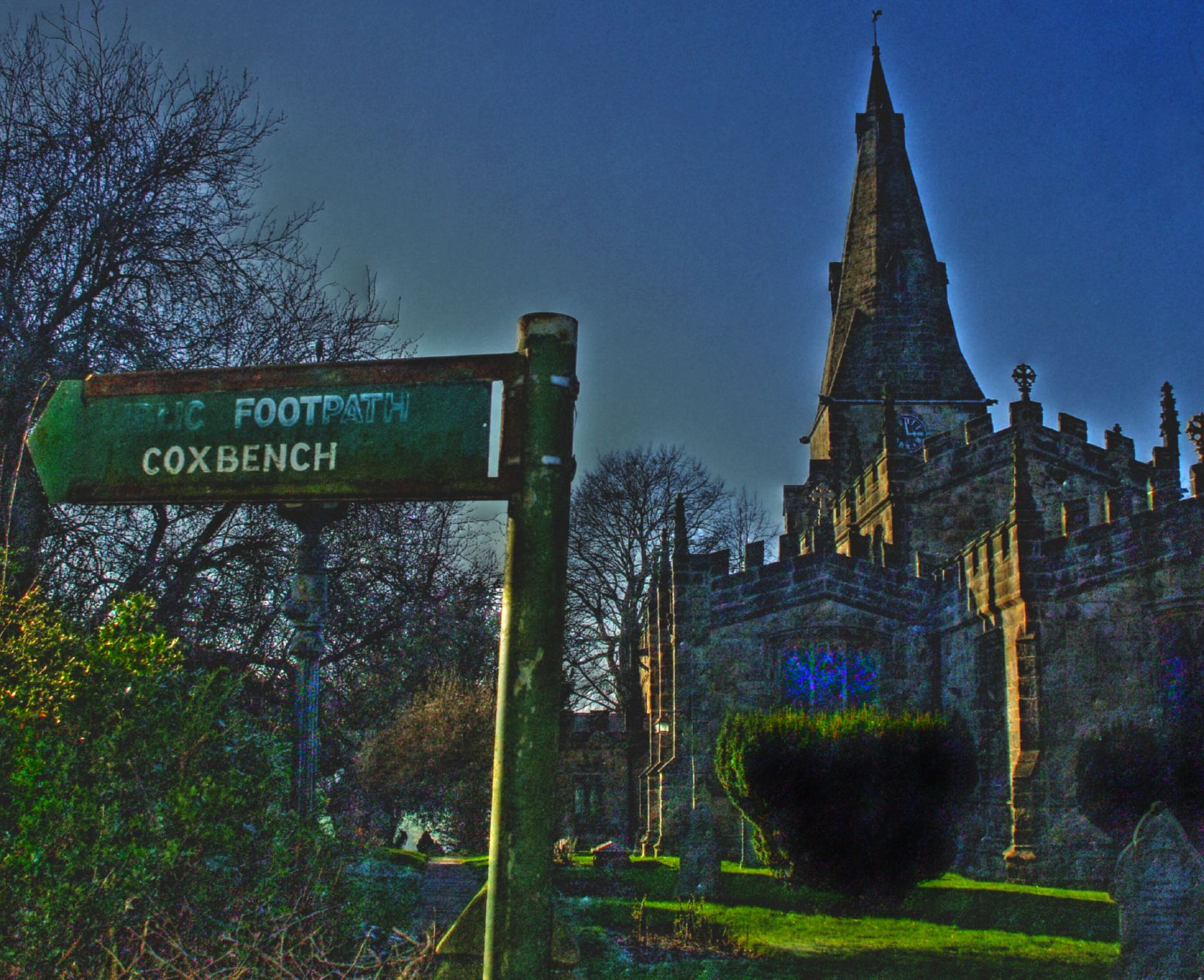
- St. Clements church

- Location within Derbyshire
- Population: 973 (2011)
- OS grid reference: SK380444
- Civil parish: Horsley
- District: Amber Valley
- Shire county: Derbyshire
- Region: East Midlands
- Country: England
- Sovereign state: United Kingdom
- Post town: DERBY
- Postcode district: DE21
- Police: Derbyshire
- Fire: Derbyshire
- Ambulance: East Midlands

Horsley is a small village in the Amber Valley district of Derbyshire, roughly 5 miles north of the City of Derby, England, with a population of 973 at the 2011 Census.

The parish church of St Clement and St John, which dates from the 13th century, was rededicated in 1450. It is noted for its fine peal of bells. The main street is Church Street which runs from east to west through the village.

Horsley has three main focal points: the village green at the West side of the village, the crossroads of The Dovecote, French Lane and Church Street, and the junction of Church Street, Lady Lea Road and Smalley Mill Road (known locally as "the triangle").

Each of these points boasts a fountain, donated to the village in 1864 by Reverend Sitwell. The fountains were named Sophia, Rosamund and Blanche after the Sitwell family's daughters. The Sitwells of Horlsey, Derbyshire, were related to the Sitwell family of Leamington Hastings, Warwickshire, where they had inherited the lordship of the manor on marrying a Wheler family heiress.

The village pub is called the Coach and Horses. Horsley also used to have a second pub called the Ship Inn, but this has been a private house for many years. A recreation ground is situated off French Lane. The rec has a small football pitch and contains the local crown green bowling club. The remains of 12th-century Horsley (Horeston) castle are about a mile away from the village itself.

Driving south from the village on Smalley Mill Road you will see Horsley Lodge and Horsley Lodge Golf Club. Opposite the golf club, Springwood Riding Club holds horse shows, on Sundays in the summer.

Horsley was originally a feudal barony and though all rights and land were separated from the feudal title, the feudal title still exists. The 26th and current Baron of Horsley is American philanthropist Terry A. Perkins.

Coxbench, which is a hamlet in the south of the parish, is supposed to have been the "Herdebi" mentioned in the Domesday Survey, as held under Henry de Ferrers; and the adjoining part of the manor of Horsley is supposed to have been the "Herdebi" held under Ralph de Burun. It was once served by Coxbench railway station on the Midland Railway Ripley Branch.

== See also ==
- Listed buildings in Horsley, Derbyshire, and Horsley Woodhouse
