= Stainsby House =

Former country house in Horsley Woodhouse, Derbyshire, England

Coordinates: 52.9941°N 1.4009°W

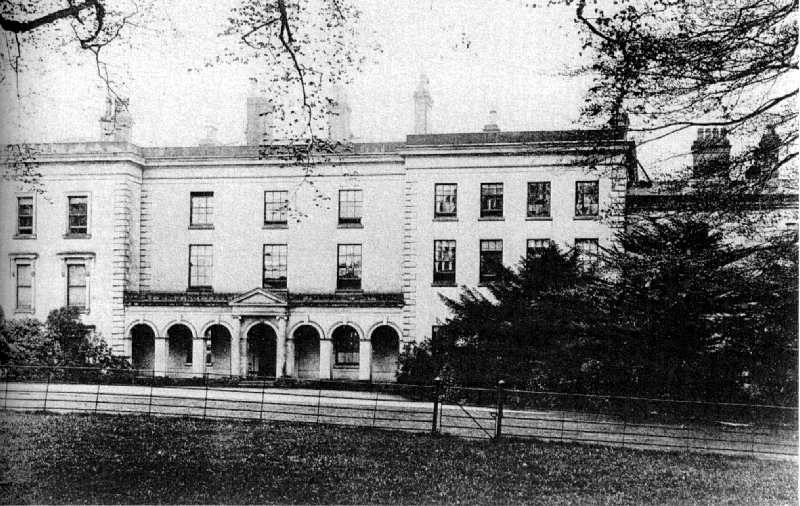
North side of the old Stainsby House, late 1800s.

Stainsby House is an architecturally notable house in Horsley Woodhouse, Derbyshire, England. It was designed by Nottingham architect David Shelley, and built for the businessman Robert Morley, owner of Alida Packaging at Heanor Gate. The house was completed in 1974.

== Old Stainsby House ==
The original Stainsby House was demolished in 1972. Its remains are grade II listed with Historic England.

== See also ==
- Listed buildings in Horsley, Derbyshire, and Horsley Woodhouse
