= Whitwell, Derbyshire =

Village in Derbyshire, England

Coordinates: 53.285°N 1.209°W

Whitwell
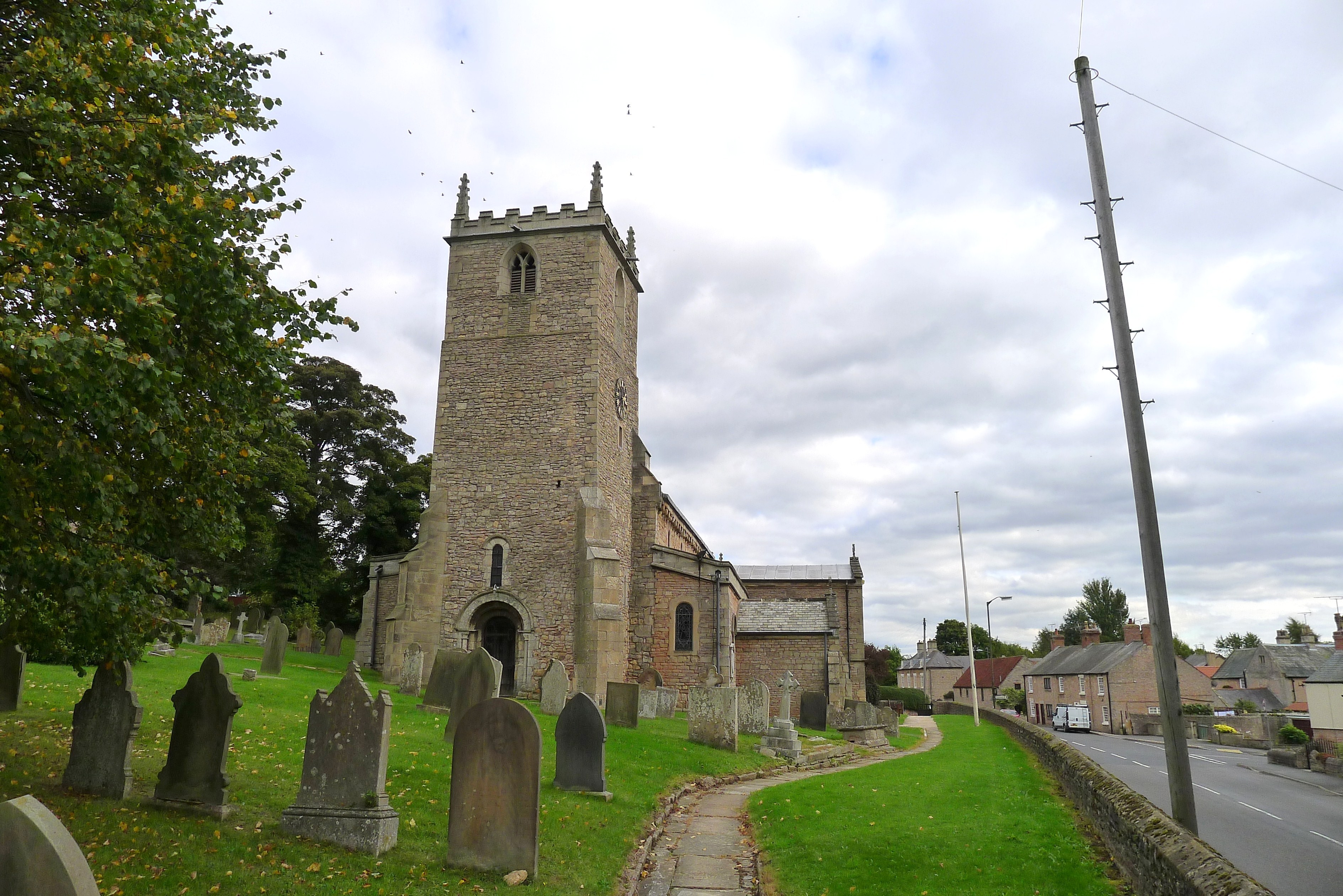
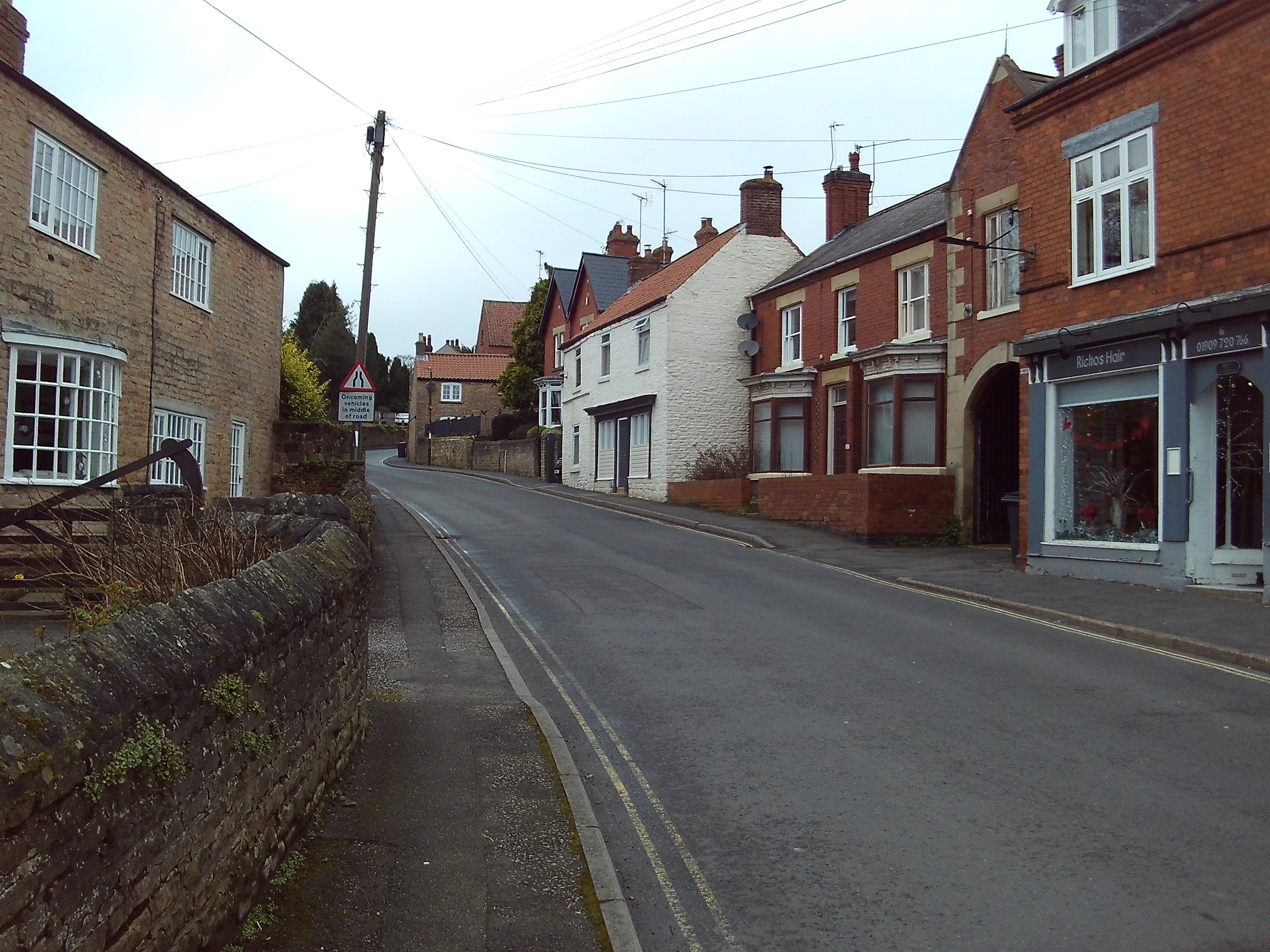
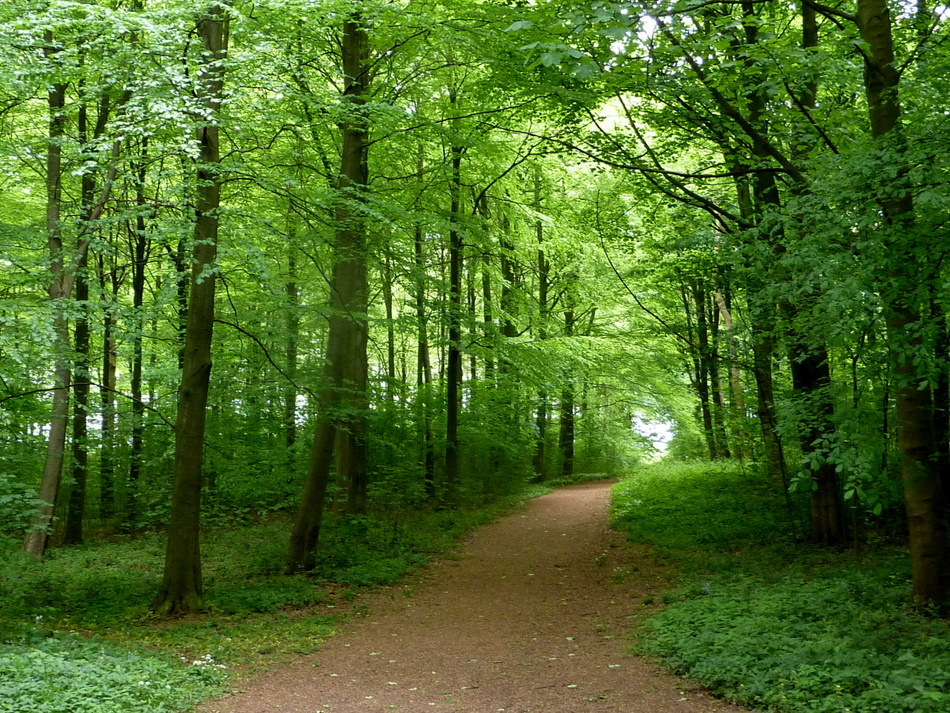
- St Lawrence Church High Street Whitwell Wood

- Location within Derbyshire
- Population: 3,721 (2021)
- OS grid reference: SK528767
- District: Bolsover
- Shire county: Derbyshire
- Region: East Midlands
- Country: England
- Sovereign state: United Kingdom
- Post town: WORKSOP
- Postcode district: S80
- Dialling code: 01909
- Police: Derbyshire
- Fire: Derbyshire
- Ambulance: East Midlands
- UK Parliament: Bolsover

Whitwell is a village in the Bolsover District of Derbyshire, England, which lies close to the border with Nottinghamshire. The population of the civil parish (including Whitwell Common) taken at the 2021 Census was 3,721.

== History ==
Although Whitwell celebrated its 1,000th anniversary in the 'Whitwell 1000' celebrations of 1989, it is much older than this celebration suggests. The earliest written references to Whitwell are from the Anglo-Saxon charters. However, many of its historical sites predate this period. Within the parish are several Iron Age burial mounds, an Iron Age fort and settlement, the remains of a Roman villa, medieval field systems, and both a Norman and Saxon church. Creswell Crags was until recently within the parish. Whitwell Old Hall is a medieval manor house.

=== Whitwell Gap (Hwitan Wylles Geat) ===
Anglo Saxon poets recorded King Alfred's grandson, King Edmund, conquering the 5 Boroughs from the Viking Earls in 942 AD, reaching as far as Dore & "Hwitan Wylles Geat" (the Whitwell Gap). Whitwell Gap would have to be a significant landscape feature to warrant mention in an Anglo Saxon chronicle and be easily identifiable but the current location of this feature is unknown. Various theories as to its location are often discussed locally including Creswell Crags, the valley of Bondhay Dike (being an ancient border) and Markland Grips.

== Amenities ==
The village has many active clubs and societies, including Whitwell Scout and Guide Group, Local History Group, Whitwell Players, Whitwell Brass Band and junior band, C of E, Methodist and Poplar churches, Natural History Group, green bowls club, cricket club and football club.

Whitwell has four public houses. It previously had as many as 11. The current pubs are the Holmefield Arms, The Jack Ups (Whitwell Social Club), The Half Moon and The Royal Oak. The biggest employer of the village is the quarry and works south of the village managed by Tarmac and Lhoist.

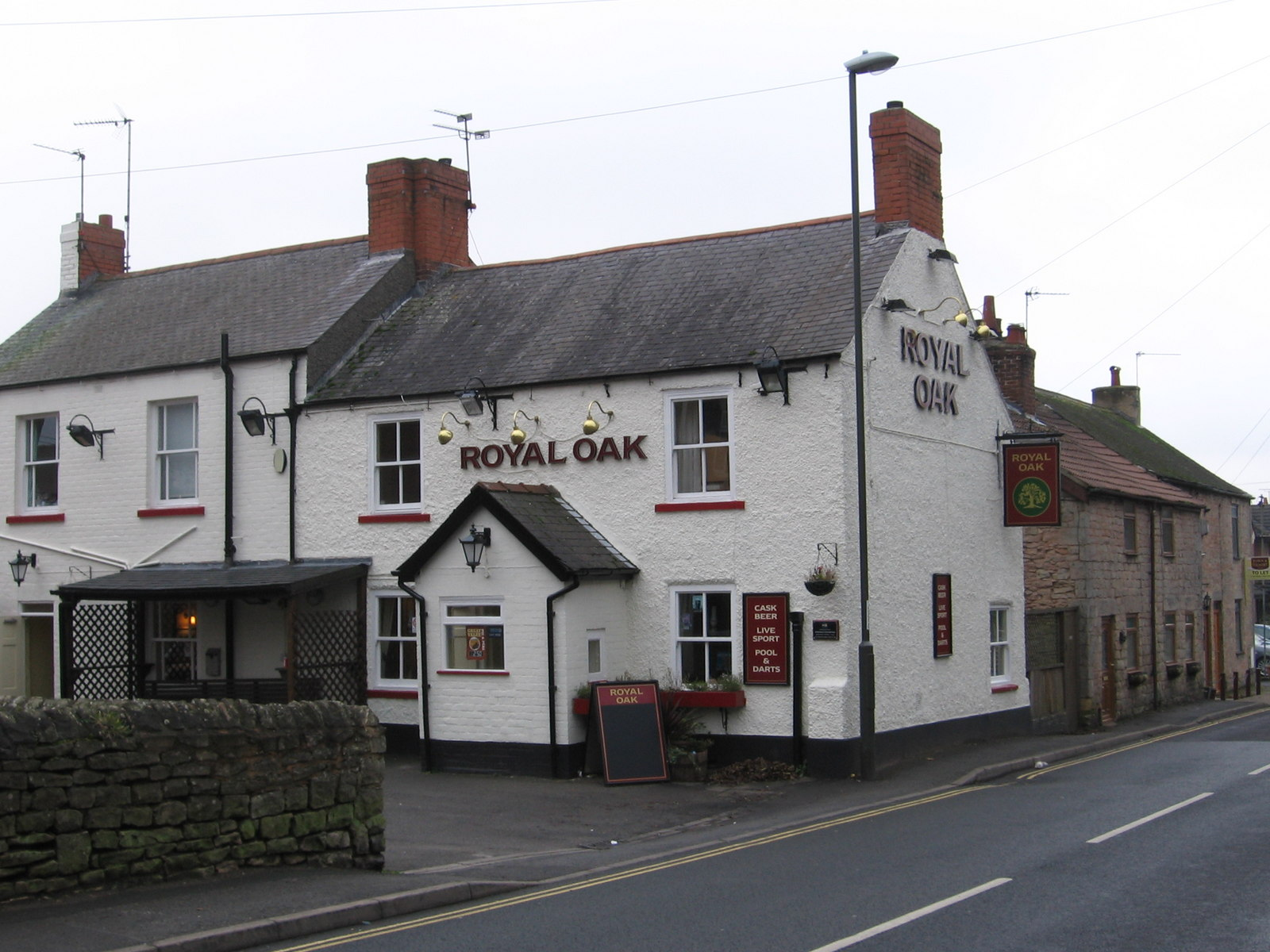
The Royal Oak Public House

== Whitwell Wood ==
Whitwell Wood is a large area of ancient woodland covering approximately 171 hectares. It forms part of the Welbeck Estate, one of the former medieval dukeries of Nottinghamshire. The wood is managed on a long-term lease by the Forestry Commission. It is a predominantly broad-leaved wood with over 20 species of trees indicating ancient woodland, a number of interesting archaeological features and a freshwater spring known as the Ginny Spring. The valley of Bondhay Dike (containing the spring) is designated as a site of special scientific interest (SSSI). This designation is partly due to the varied flora, but also because of a number of species that are rare in the region; particularly rare orchids. As such, the wood has a very high nature conservation status. A Three Shires Oak once stood in a field beside Whitwell Wood, traditionally marking the meeting point of the counties of Derbyshire, Nottinghamshire and Yorkshire; a younger oak has been planted further from the wood close to the new meeting point of the counties.

== Notable people ==
Great War poet Will Streets (1886–1916) was from Whitwell, recorded as living in Oak Terrace, now Portland Street. Streets was recorded wounded and missing on the first day of the Battle of the Somme and later recorded killed in action. His poetry collection The Undying Splendour was published posthumously in 1916.

One of Whitwell's most famous sons was Joe Davis (1901–1978), world snooker and billiards champion from the 1920s to the 1940s. His Whitwell home (on Welbeck Street) bears a plaque commemorating him.

The village is the birthplace and childhood home of J. T. Edson (1928–2014), the author, whose various escapism-adventure series sold over 27 million copies globally; the Edson family lived in Whitwell from Victorian times.

=== Sport ===
- George Glossop Walker (1860–1908), cricketer who played 75 First-class cricket matches for Derbyshire.
- Jack Brown (1899–1962), football goalkeeper, played 465 games for Sheffield Wednesday
- Les Jackson (1921–2007), England cricketer and Wisden Cricketer of the Year in 1959, he played 418 First-class cricket matches and played for Whitwell Cricket Club and came to watch their games on a Saturday afternoon until his death.
- Chris Adams (born 1970), cricketer, played 336 First-class cricket matches and 5 Test cricket matches
- Ian Bennett (born 1971), football goalkeeper, played for 448 games including 287 for Birmingham City

== See also ==
- Listed buildings in Whitwell, Derbyshire
