= Digby, Lincolnshire =

Village in Lincolnshire, England

Coordinates: 53.078353°N 0.391811°W

Digby
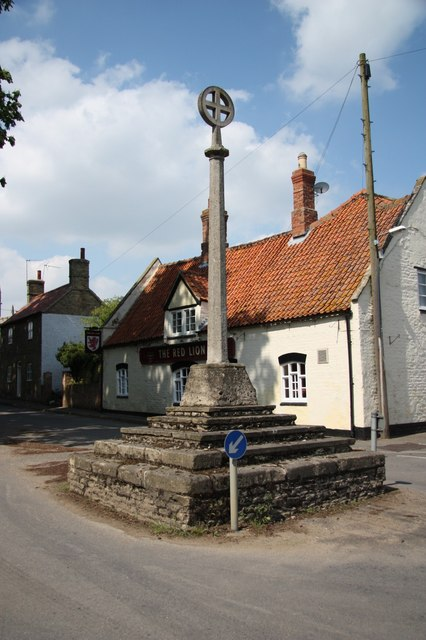
- Digby Cross

- Location within Lincolnshire
- Population: 621 (2011)
- OS grid reference: TF078546
  - London: 105 mi (169 km) S
- District: North Kesteven
- Shire county: Lincolnshire
- Region: East Midlands
- Country: England
- Sovereign state: United Kingdom
- Post town: Lincoln
- Postcode district: LN4
- Police: Lincolnshire
- Fire: Lincolnshire
- Ambulance: East Midlands
- UK Parliament: Sleaford and North Hykeham

Digby is a small village and civil parish in the district of North Kesteven, Lincolnshire, England. The village is in the vale of the Digby Beck watercourse, 6 miles (10 km) north from the town of Sleaford and 12 miles (19 km) south from Lincoln city centre. The village has a population of about 574, increasing to 621 at the 2011 census, and a parish council.

== Etymology ==
The name Digby is of Old English (dic "dyke, ditch") and Old Norse (býr "farm, settlement") origin.

== History and landmarks ==
A Neolithic partly polished axe was found in Digby.

Two Bronze Age stone axes, about 4,000 years old, were also found here, one now in private possession, the other at Lincoln Museum. Also found were two Bronze Age arrowheads, again one in private possession. the other at Lincoln Museum

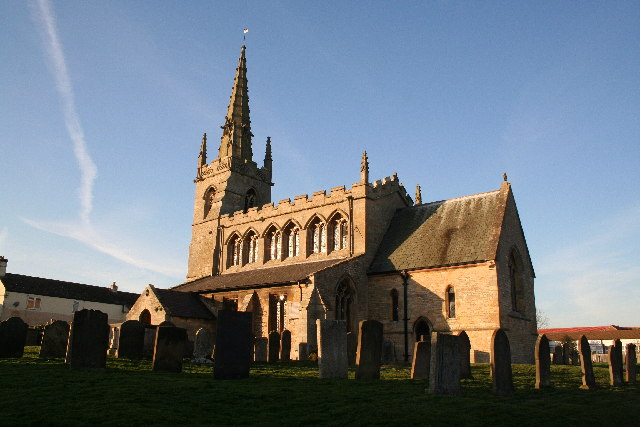
St. Thomas Martyr's church, Digby

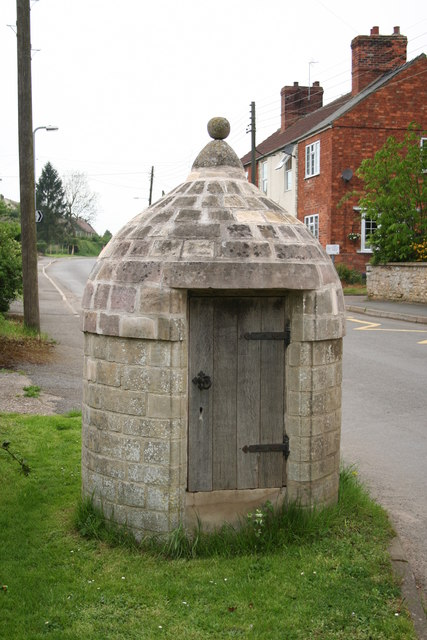
The village lock-up (rarely used)

The church is dedicated to Thomas Becket and has a porch with strong Saxon elements and carvings. Built in the Gothic style, it has a tall spire, and is Grade I listed. There is also a circular village lock-up which is Grade II listed, and a medieval stone buttercross in the centre of the village which is Grade II listed, and a scheduled monument although the top section of the pillar and cross appear to have been renewed, probably during the Victorian period. In the 1930s the churchyard was said to be haunted. The church spire was struck by lightning in August 1907 leading to repairs costing £80.

Near the village is the Royal Air Force grass airfield of RAF Digby (formerly RAF Scopwick). During the Second World War the station was home to Hurricane and Spitfire squadrons and to Douglas Bader, Guy Gibson, and the pilot and poet John Gillespie Magee. The airfield was Canadian later in the war, as RCAF Digby Fighter Station, with the Operations Room and billets at nearby Blankney Hall.

== Community ==
The village has a school, the Digby C of E School for children aged 4 to 11, the Red Lion public house, allotments, and a winery which uses local produce. There is a War Memorial Hall in Church Street.

Beck House on Beck Street is a Grade II listed stone farmhouse dating back several hundred years. There are also examples of 18th- and 19th-century buildings, now private dwellings, including Digby Manor House, a listed building situated on North Street almost opposite a new housing development, Chestnut Close.

During 2009 the Village Hall frontage underwent extensive re-development and now provides seating and new gardens.

The Lincolnshire Wildlife Trust manage Digby Corner as a wildlife sanctuary. In June 2007 Digby Fen was home to a breeding pair of Montagu's harriers, the rarest breeding birds of prey in the British Isles.

== Transport ==
The village is on the north–south B1188 approximately 6 miles (10 km) west from the National Cycle Network's National Route 1. Ruskington railway station is 3 miles (5 km) to the south, on the Sleaford to Lincoln line. Approximately 15 miles (24 km) south-west from Digby is Grantham, which has a regular East Coast Main Line express train to London.
