= Hunmanby lock-up =

Village lock-up in Hunmanby, North Yorkshire, England

Coordinates: 54°10′54″N 0°18′51″W

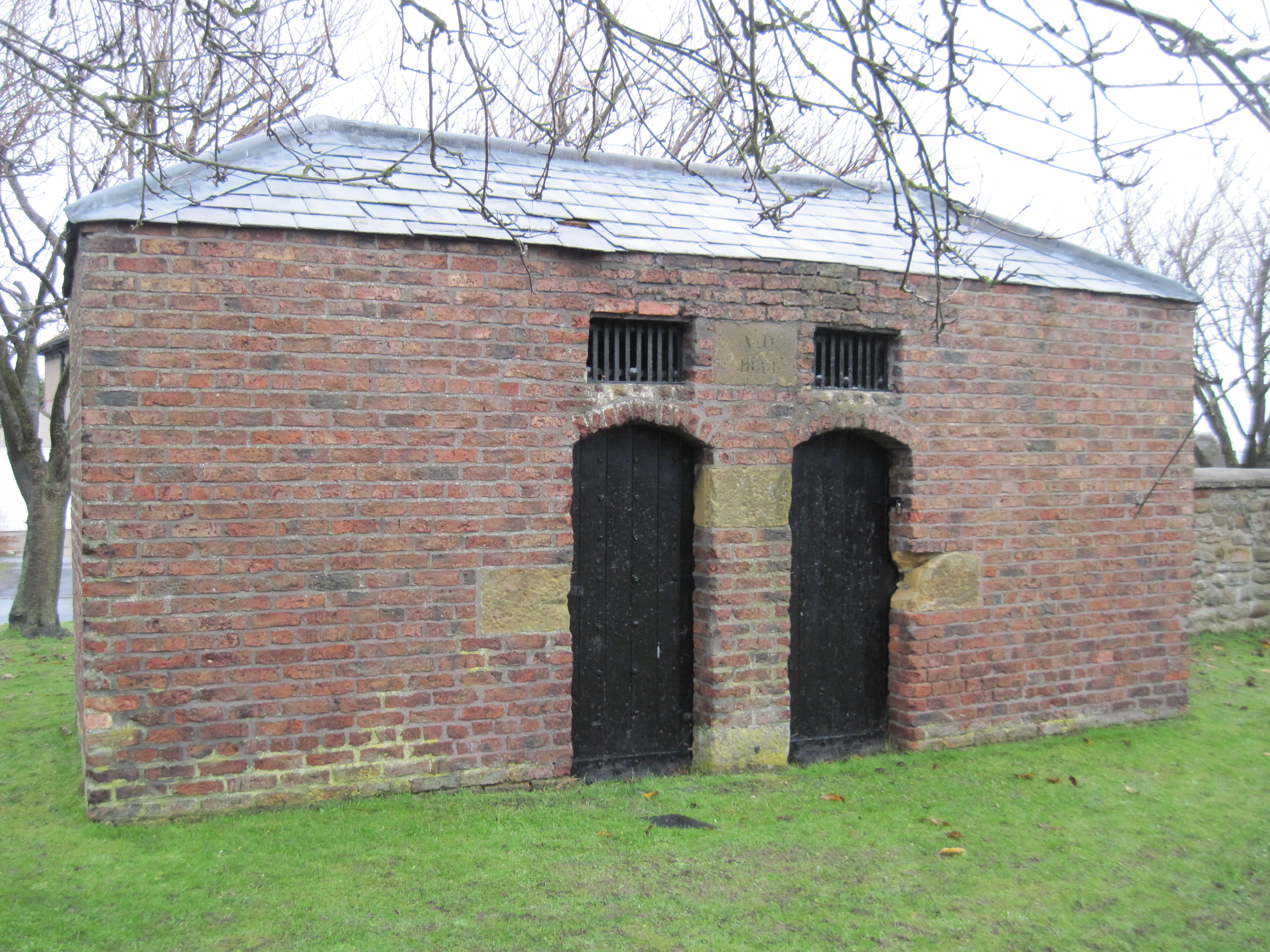
The building, in 2009

Hunmanby lock-up is a historic building in Hunmanby, a village in North Yorkshire, in England.

The building was constructed in 1834 as the village lock-up, for the temporary detention of people. The village's animal pound was in poor condition, so a new pound was constructed, adjoining the lock-up. The lock-up fell out of use in the 1890s, after a police station was constructed in nearby Filey. The building was grade II listed in 1952.

The building is constructed of blue and pink brick with stone dressings and a hipped slate roof. There is a single storey, a rectangular plan, and two bays. In the centre are two segmental-arched doorways of gauged brick, divided by a pier with a stone impost block, and there is a quoin to each outer jamb. Above each doorway is a horizontal iron grille with a datestone between. There are no windows. Inside, it is divided into two cells, in order that two people involved in a fight could be separated.

== See also ==
- Listed buildings in Hunmanby
