= Village lock-up =

Historic building once used for the temporary detention of people

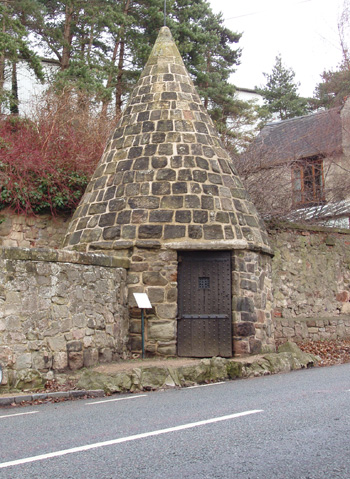
Lock-up in Breedon on the Hill, Leicestershire

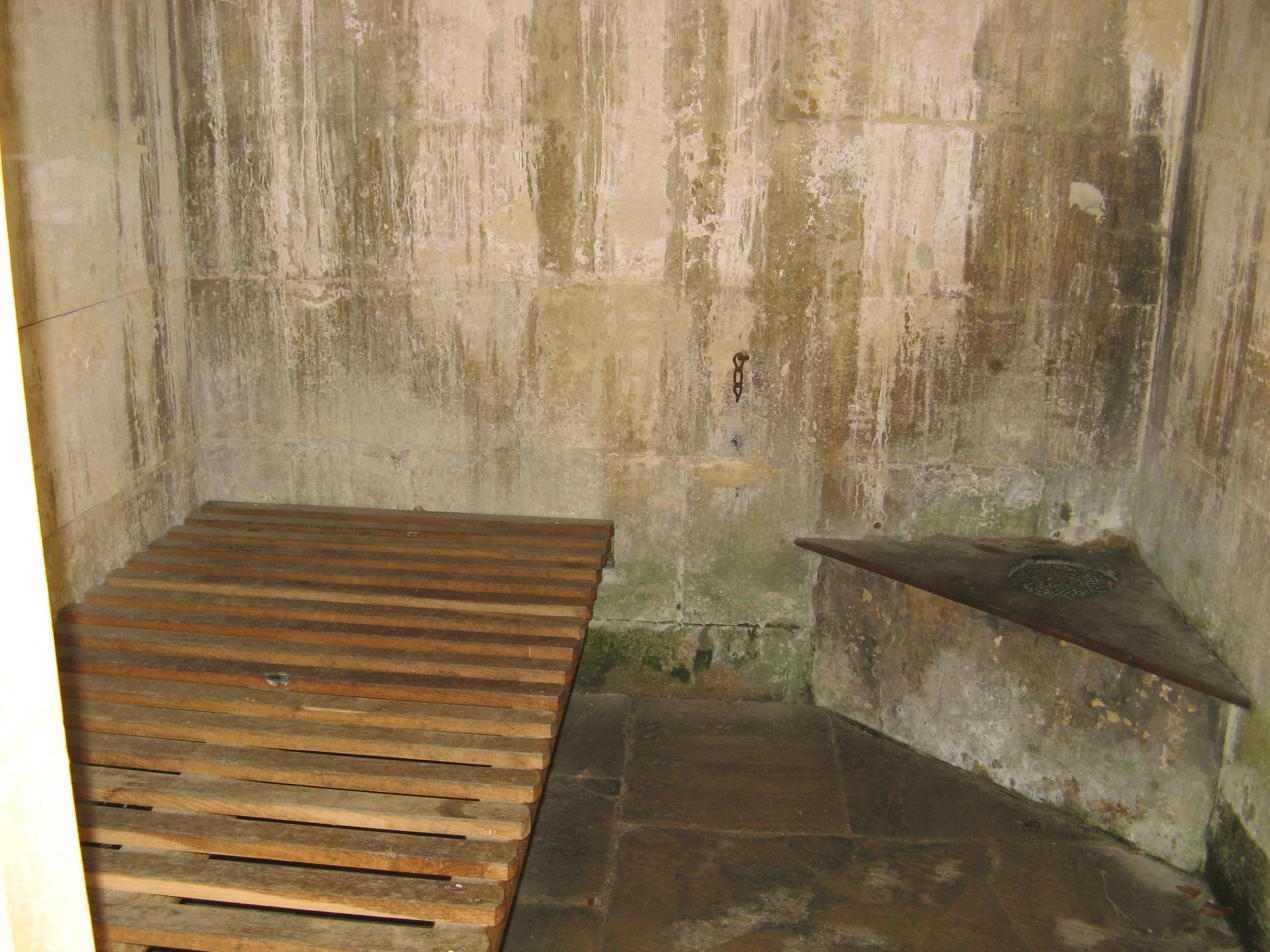
Interior cell of lock-up in Lacock, Wiltshire

A village lock-up is a historic building once used for the temporary detention of people in England and Wales, mostly where official prisons or criminal courts were beyond easy walking distance. Lockups were often used for the confinement of drunks, who were usually released the next day, or to hold people being brought before the local magistrate. The archetypal form comprises a small room with a single door and a narrow slit window, grating or holes. Most lock-ups feature a tiled or stone-built dome or spire as a roof and are built from brick, stone or timber.

Such a room was built in many shapes; many are round, which gives rise to a sub-description: the punishment or village round-house (Welsh: rheinws, rowndws). Village lock-ups, though usually freestanding, were often attached to walls, tall pillar/tower village crosses or incorporated into other buildings. Varying in architectural strength and ornamentation, they were all built to perform the same function.

== Nicknames and forms ==
They have acquired local nicknames and descriptions including blind-house, bone-house, bridewell, village cage, punishment cage, jug, kitty, lobby, guard-house, round-house/roundhouse, tower and watch-house.

== Rise of the village lock-up ==
The majority of surviving village lock-ups date from the 18th and 19th centuries when rural communities struggled to police thefts, burglaries, shootings, drunkenness, the obstruction of watchmen and the stealing of livestock. During this period a number of lock-ups were built, by official decree, as a temporary place of detention for local rogues and miscreants until they could be removed to a town. For example, in 1790 the Derbyshire court of quarter sessions issued an order that required that "all parishes in the county where there is not already a Round House, House of correction, or Gaol, shall provide a place of temporary confinement for the reception of vagrants, paupers, felons and the like". Over time they became synonymous with drunkenness and many references to this coupling can be found in famous works of literature, including Barnaby Rudge (1841) by Charles Dickens, and The Water-Babies (1863) by Charles Kingsley, which contains the line:

Put him in the round house till he gets sober

An 1830 description of a lock-up in Taunton describes "... a hole into which drunken and bleeding men were thrust and allowed to remain until the following day when the constable with his staff of office take the poor, crippled and dirty wretches before a magistrate, followed by half the boys and idle fellows of the town".

Some lock-ups also had stocks, ducking stools, pillories, or pinfolds, alongside them and the origins of the 18th-century village lock-up evolved from much earlier examples of holding cells and devices.

The Oxford English Dictionary refers to a round-house as a place of detention for arrested persons and dates its first written usage to 1589.

== Decline and later uses ==
The rooms fell out of use when the County Police Act 1839 was introduced and more stations were built with their own holding facilities. The Act allowed justices of the peace to set up a paid police force in each county and made it compulsory for that force to be provided with proper police stations and secure cells. The village lock-up became a redundant edifice as a result and only a small fraction have survived.

During World War II many were used by the Home Guard as sentry posts and arms stores.

In recent decades many owners have repaired these structures and/or seen nomination as listed buildings; a presumption of acceptance applies to buildings earlier than 1840. Some are local heritage attractions; others are in a ruinous state; others have been converted into parts of homes, yards or gardens.

A register of these structures, including those which have been lost, is held by the Village Lock-up Association.

== Notable village lock-ups ==
The crest of Everton Football Club features Everton Lock-Up which still stands on Everton Brow, Liverpool.

D. H. Lawrence and his German-born wife Frieda had to report to the lock-up in Wirksworth during the First World War when they lived at Middleton-by-Wirksworth.

In 1281 an analogous building (the Tun) was erected in Cornhill, central London – a two-storey barrel shaped design with a single cell on each floor.

== Surviving lock-ups in England and Wales ==
=== England ===
Bedfordshire

Barton-le-Clay, Clophill, Harrold, Silsoe

Berkshire

Aldermaston, Pangbourne

Bristol

Westbury-on-Trym

Buckinghamshire

Amersham, (Note: Incorporated into other structures such as a church or house.) Great Missenden, Wendover, West Wycombe

Cambridgeshire

Broughton, Burwell, Coveney, Eaton Socon, Fen Drayton, Fenstanton, Litlington, (Holywell-cum-)Needingworth, Parson Drove, Sawtry

Cheshire

Farndon, Farnworth, Kelsall, Winsford

Cumbria

Cartmel

Derbyshire

Alfreton, Ashbourne?, Curbar, Cromford (Derwent Valley Mills), Sandiacre, Smisby, Swarkestone (ruin), Ticknall, Wirksworth

Dorset

Gillingham, Lyme Regis, Swanage

Durham

Barnard Castle, Staindrop

East Sussex

Alfriston, Lewes, Pevensey

Essex

Bradwell-on-Sea, Braintree, Canewdon, Great Bardfield, Great Dunmow, Orsett, Steeple Bumpstead, Thaxted (in Guildhall), Tollesbury

Gloucestershire

Bisley, Bibury, Cirencester, Moreton-in-Marsh, Stroud, Thornbury, Westerleigh

Greater London

Cranford, Hampstead, Petersham

Hampshire

Easton (demolished), Odiham

Herefordshire

Bridstow, Leintwardine, Yarpole

Hertfordshire

Anstey, Ashwell, Barley, Buntingford, Shenley

Kent

Dartford, Lenham, Wateringbury

Lancashire

Bury, North Meols, Poulton le Fylde?, Prescot

Leicestershire

Barrow-upon-Soar, Breedon-on-the-Hill, Castle Donington?, Packington, Worthington

Lincolnshire

Deeping St James, Digby

Merseyside

Everton, Wavertree

Norfolk

Docking, Horsham St Faith, Great Yarmouth, Thetford?, Walsingham?

Northamptonshire

Weldon

Northumberland

Stamfordham

Nottinghamshire

Edwinstowe?, Mansfield Woodhouse?, Tuxford

Oxfordshire

Banbury, Bicester, Burford, Filkins, Stonesfield, Wheatley

Shropshire

Prees

Somerset

Bathford, Buckland Dinham, Castle Cary, Frome, Kelston, Kilmersdon, Kingsbury Episcopi, Mells, Merriott, Monkton Combe, Nunney, Publow in Pensford, Nether Stowey, Watchett, Wells, Wrington

Staffordshire

Alton, Gnosall, Penkridge, Stafford: Forebridge

Suffolk

Sproughton, Stoke by Nayland, Woolpit

Sussex

East Grinstead

Surrey

Charlwood, Ewell, Lingfield

Wiltshire

Box, Bradford-on-Avon, Bromham, Chippenham, Devizes, Great Bedwyn, Heytesbury, Hilperton, Lacock, Luckington, Shrewton, Steeple Ashton, Trowbridge, Warminster

Yorkshire

Addingham?, Fairburn, Illingworth, Heptonstall, Holmfirth (Holm Valley), Hunmanby, Workhouse Farm of Holme upon Spalding Moor Horbury in Wakefield, Kirkheaton, Luddenden, Nether Poppleton?, North Stainley?, Oswaldkirk, Rastrick, Rotherham, Seamer, Snaith, Throp Arch, Topcliffe?, Wath-upon-Dearne

=== Wales ===
Flintshire

Bagillt?, Hawarden

Gwynedd

Barmouth, Clynnog Fawr

Wrexham

Ruabon

== Gallery ==
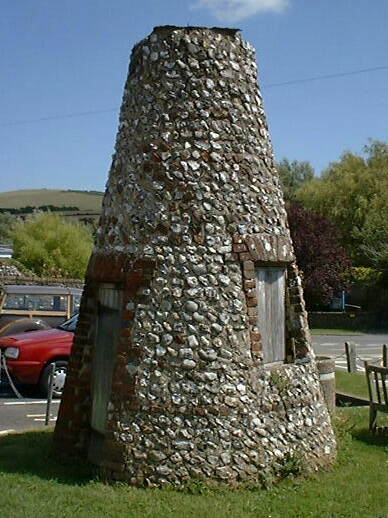
Alfriston lock-up

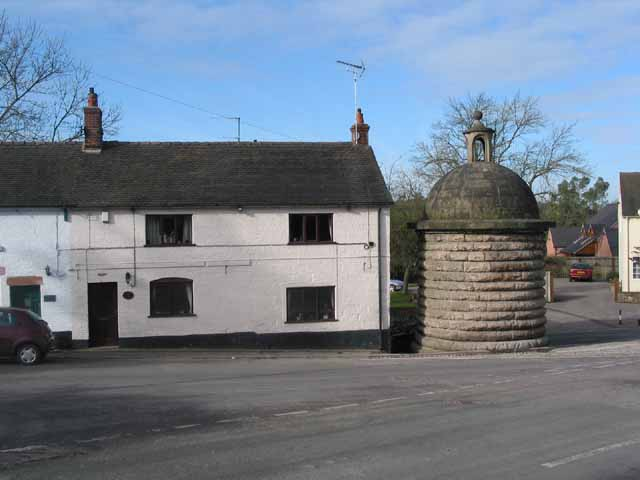
Alton lock-up

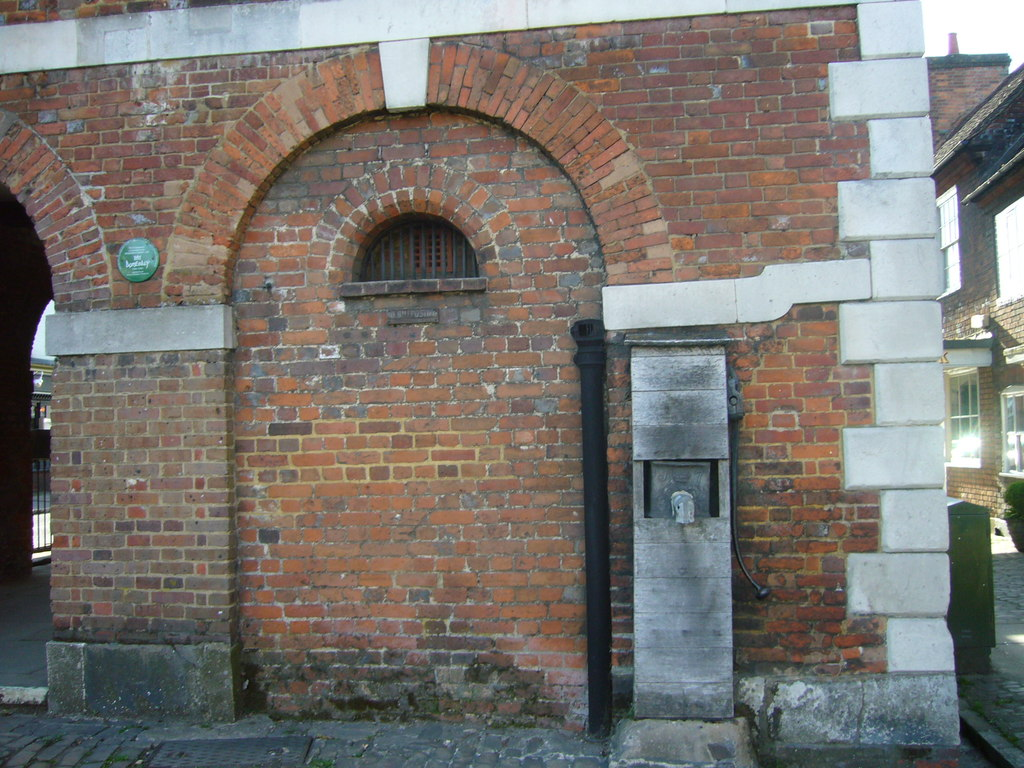
Amersham Lock-up

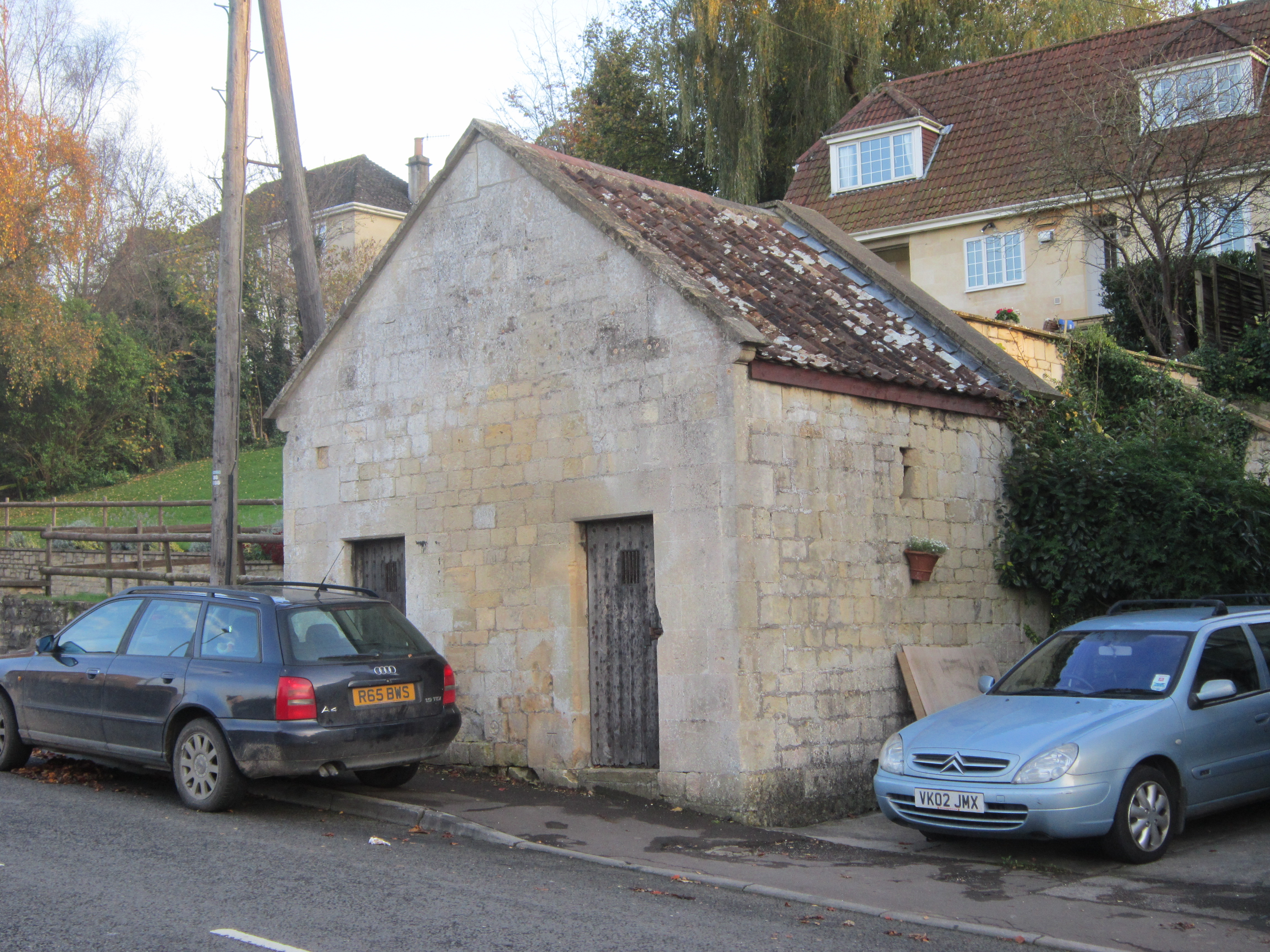
Bathford lock-up

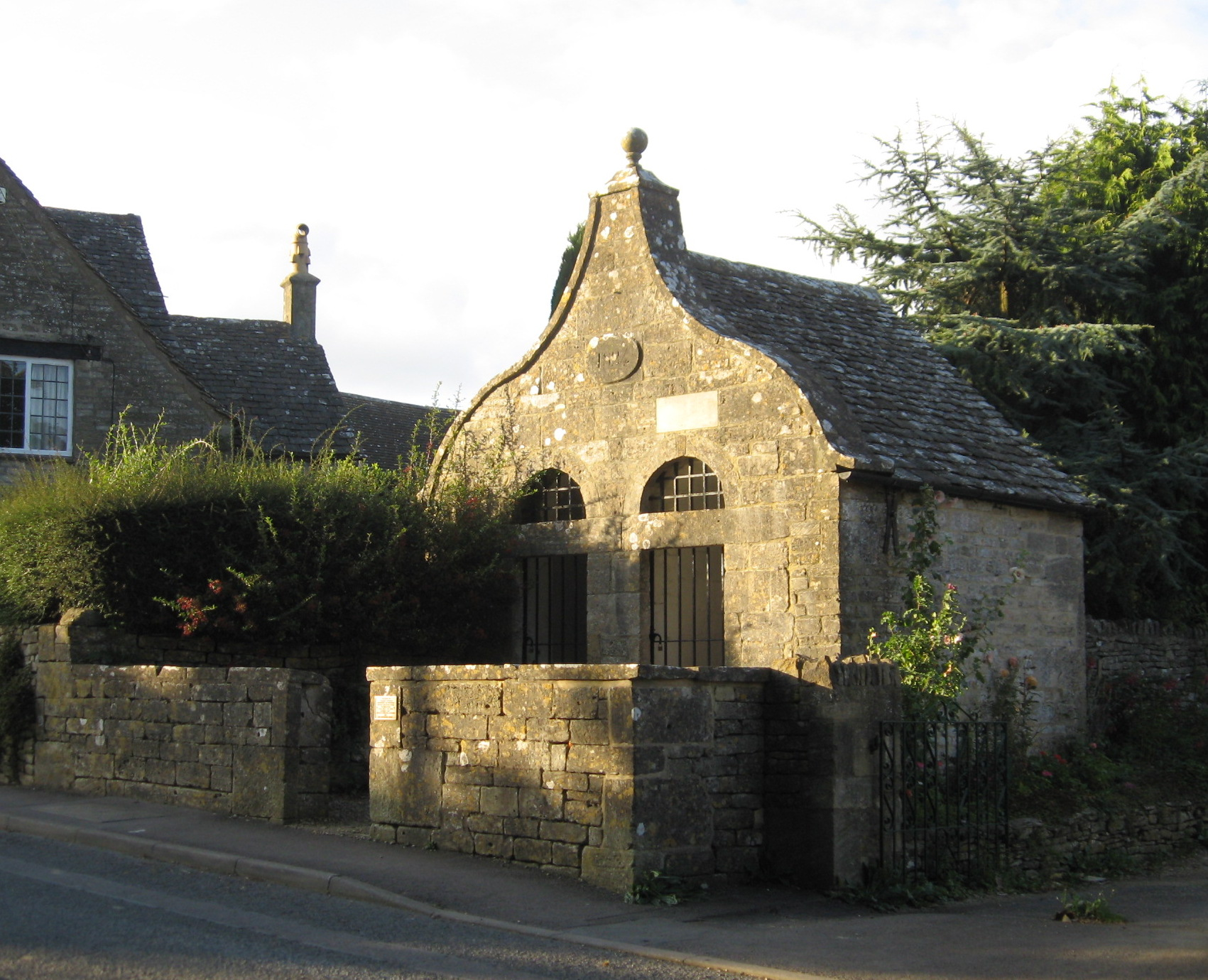
Bisley lock-up

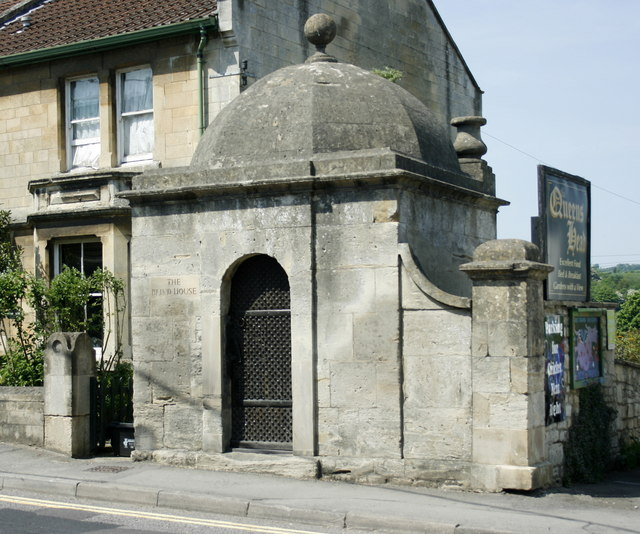
"The Blind House", Box

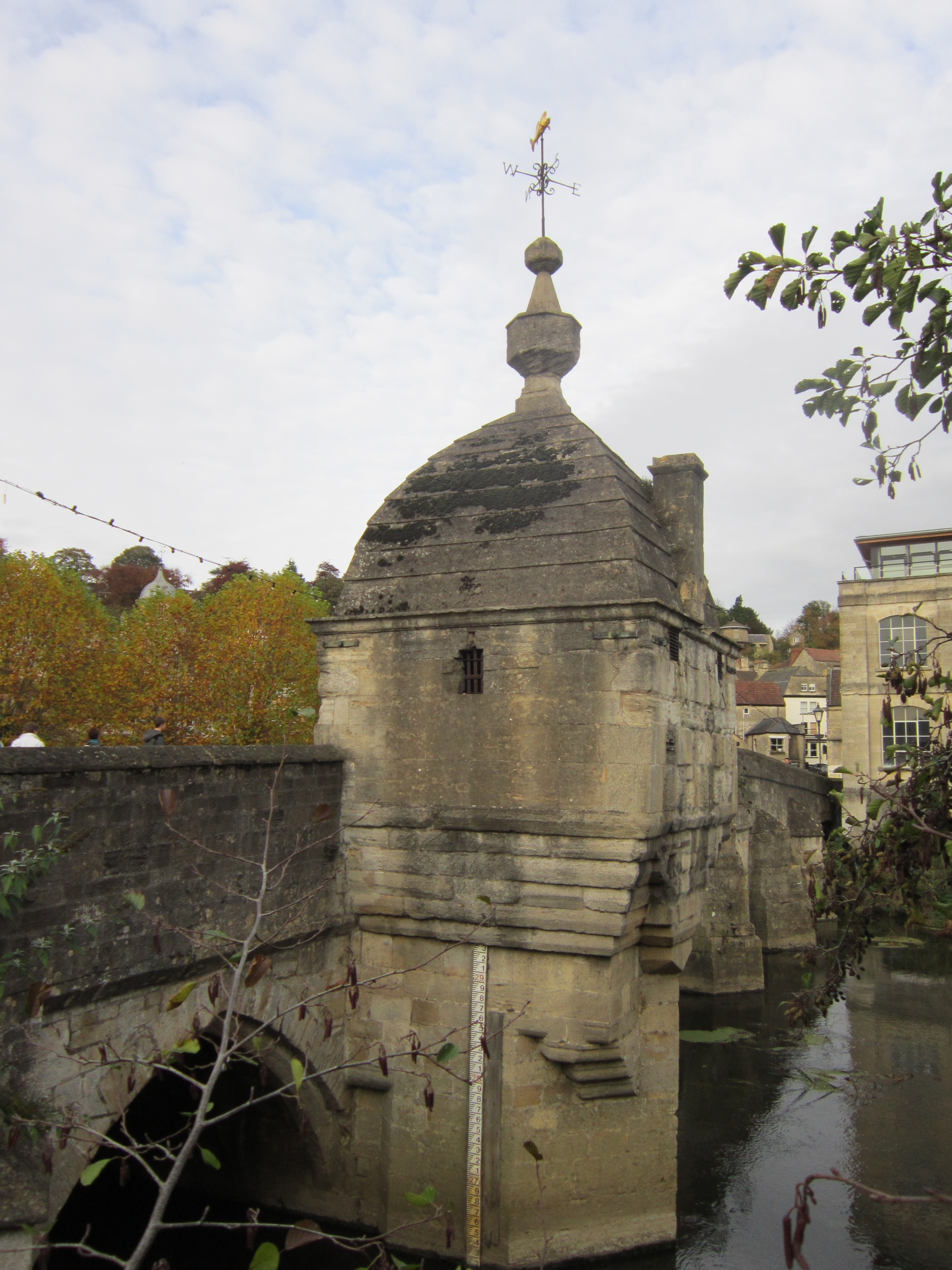
Bradford-on-Avon lock-up

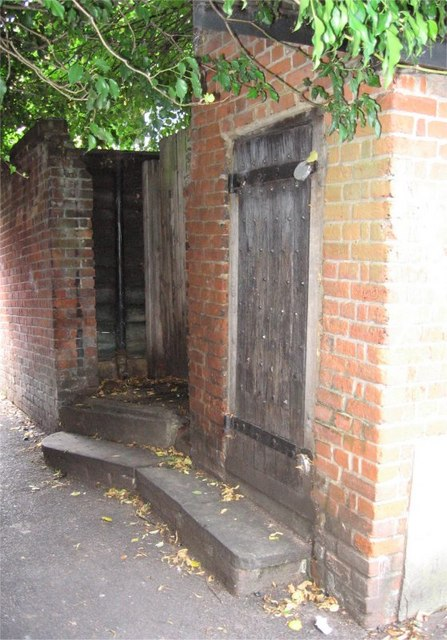
Braintree Cage

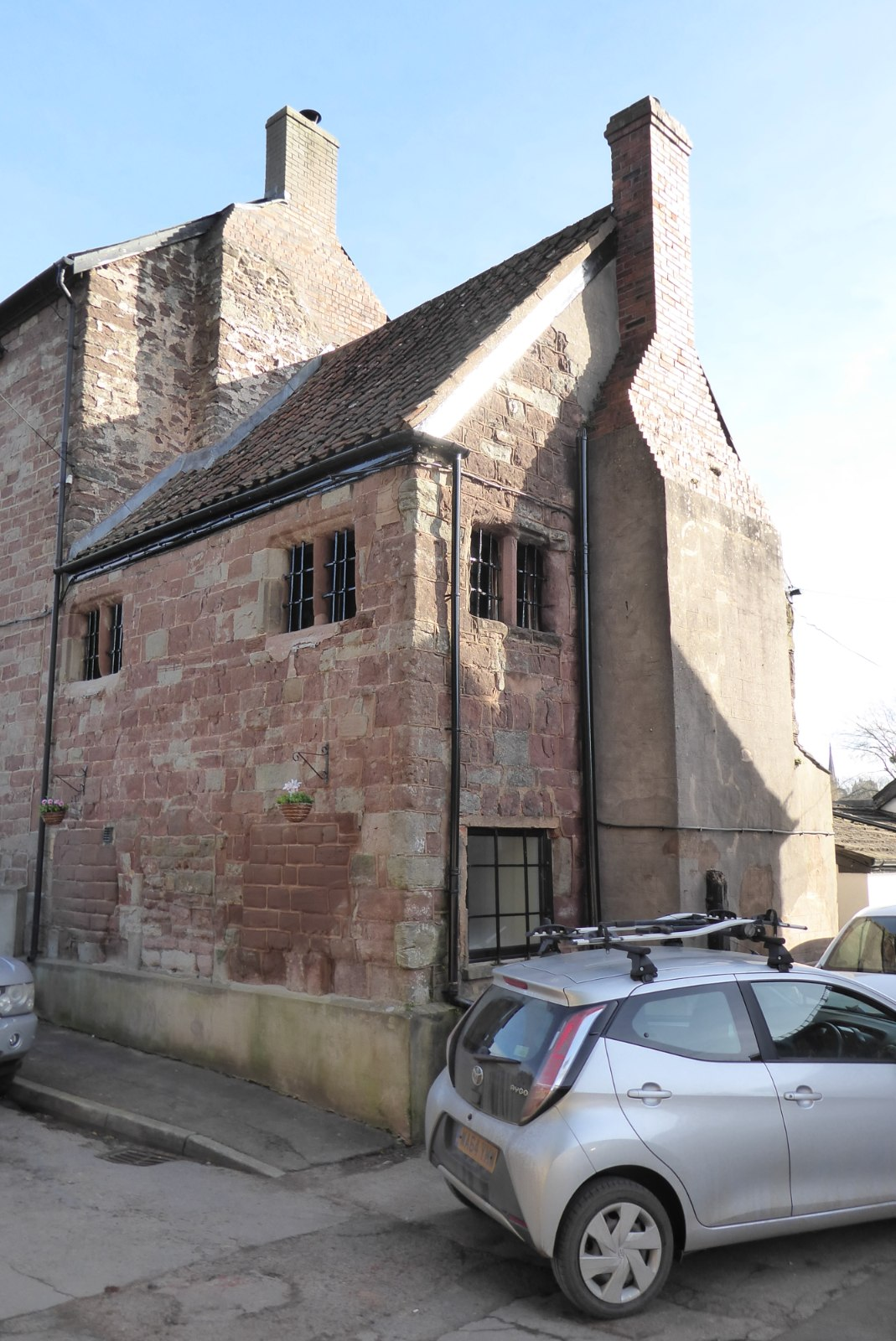
Old Prison, Bridstow

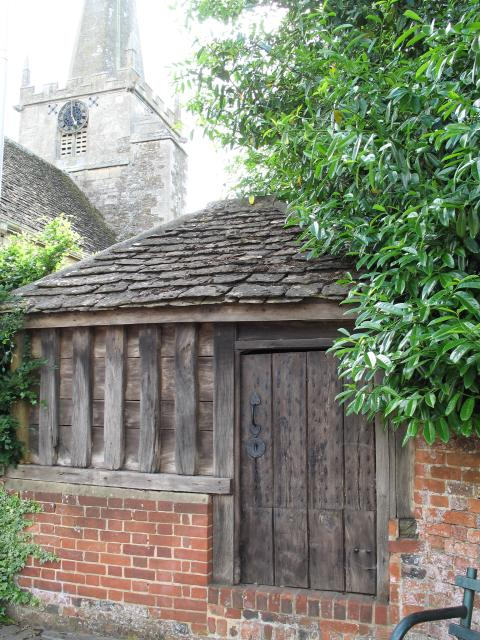
Bromham lock-up

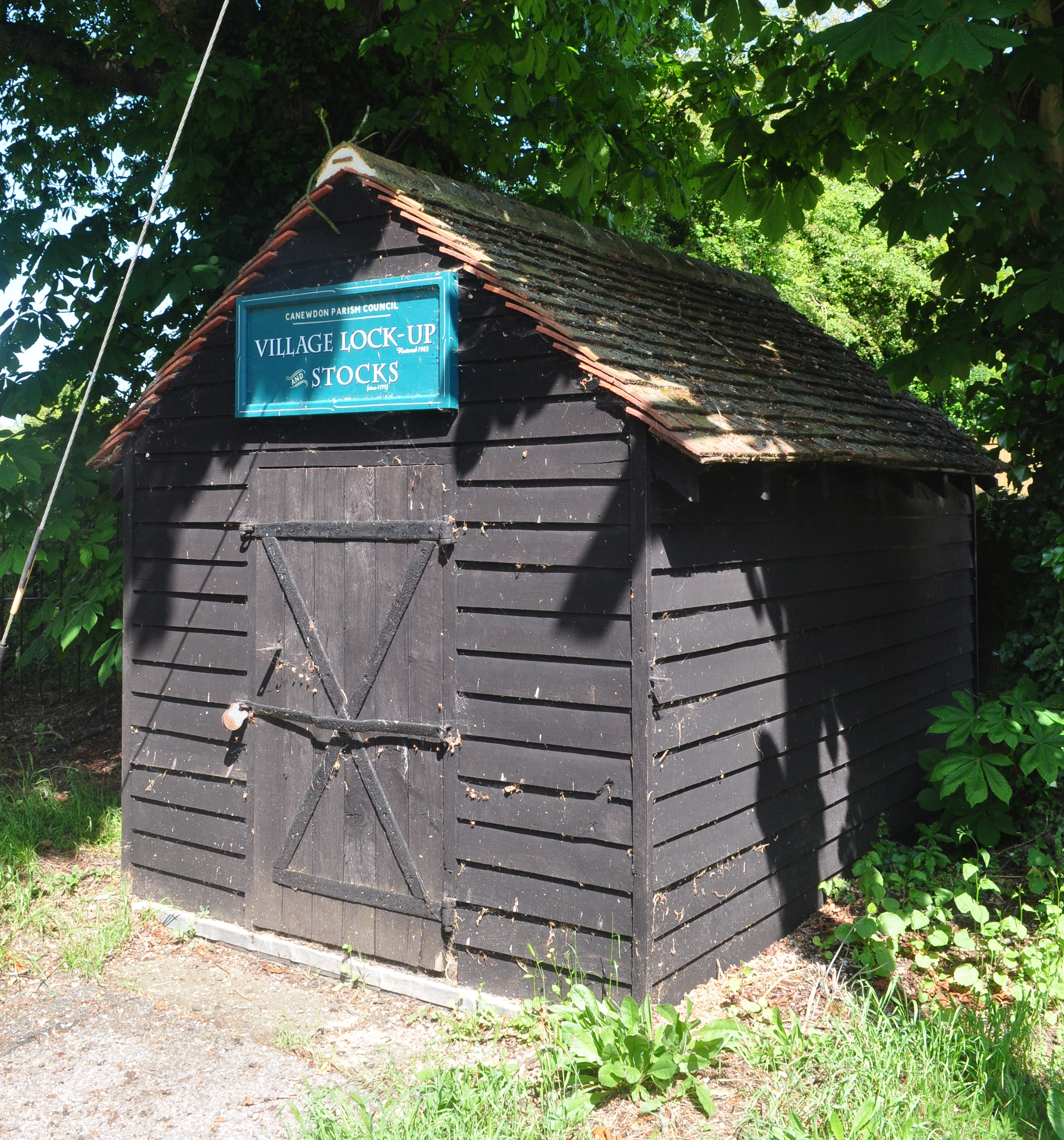
Canewdon lock-up, made circa 1775

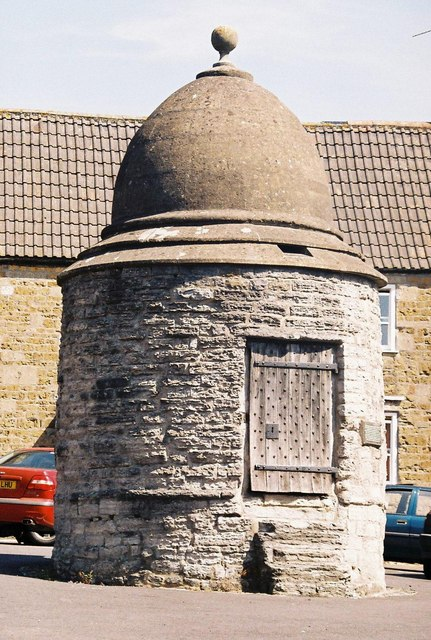
Castle Cary lock-up

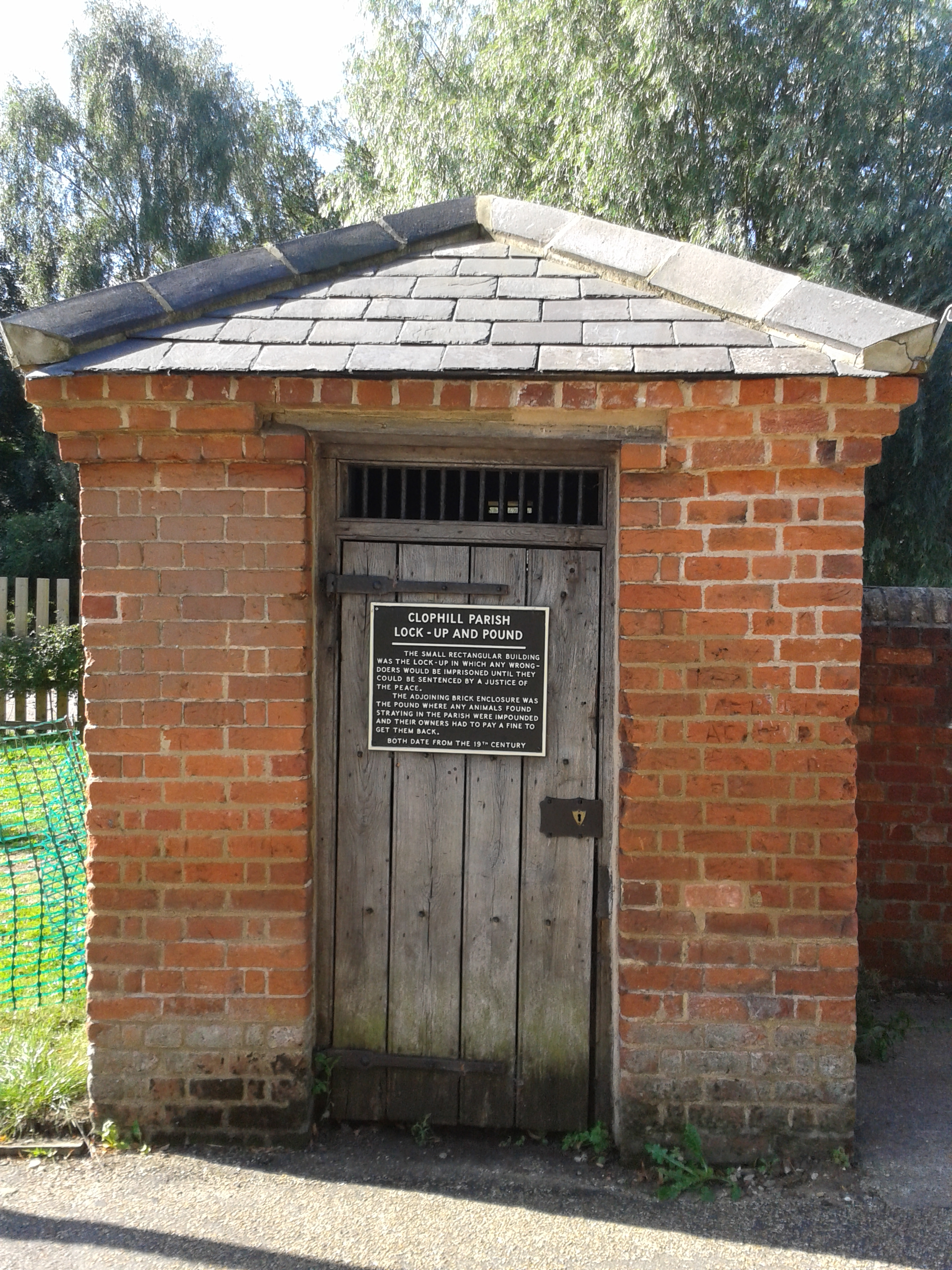
Clophill lock-up

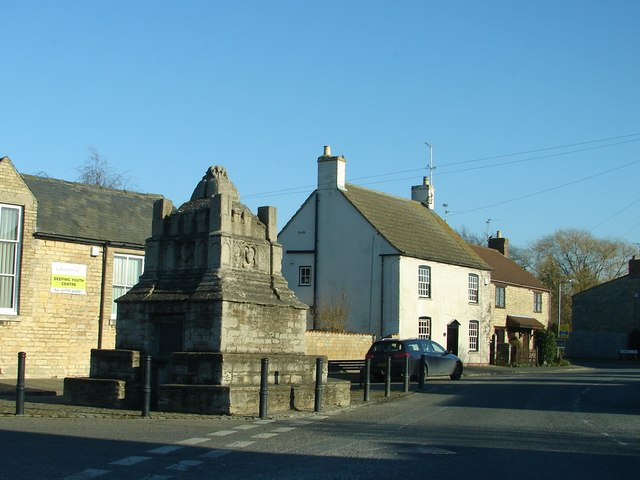
Deeping St James lock-up

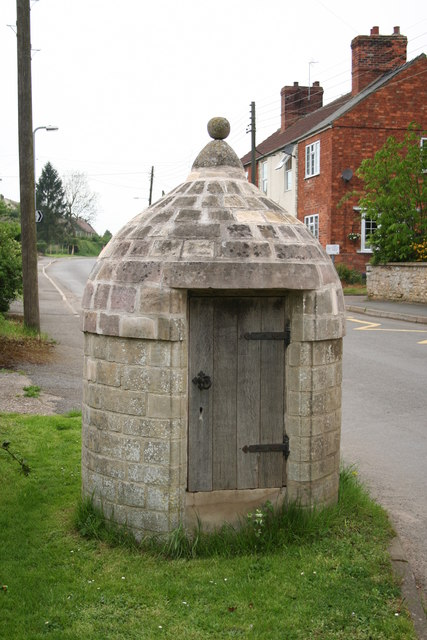
Digby lock-up

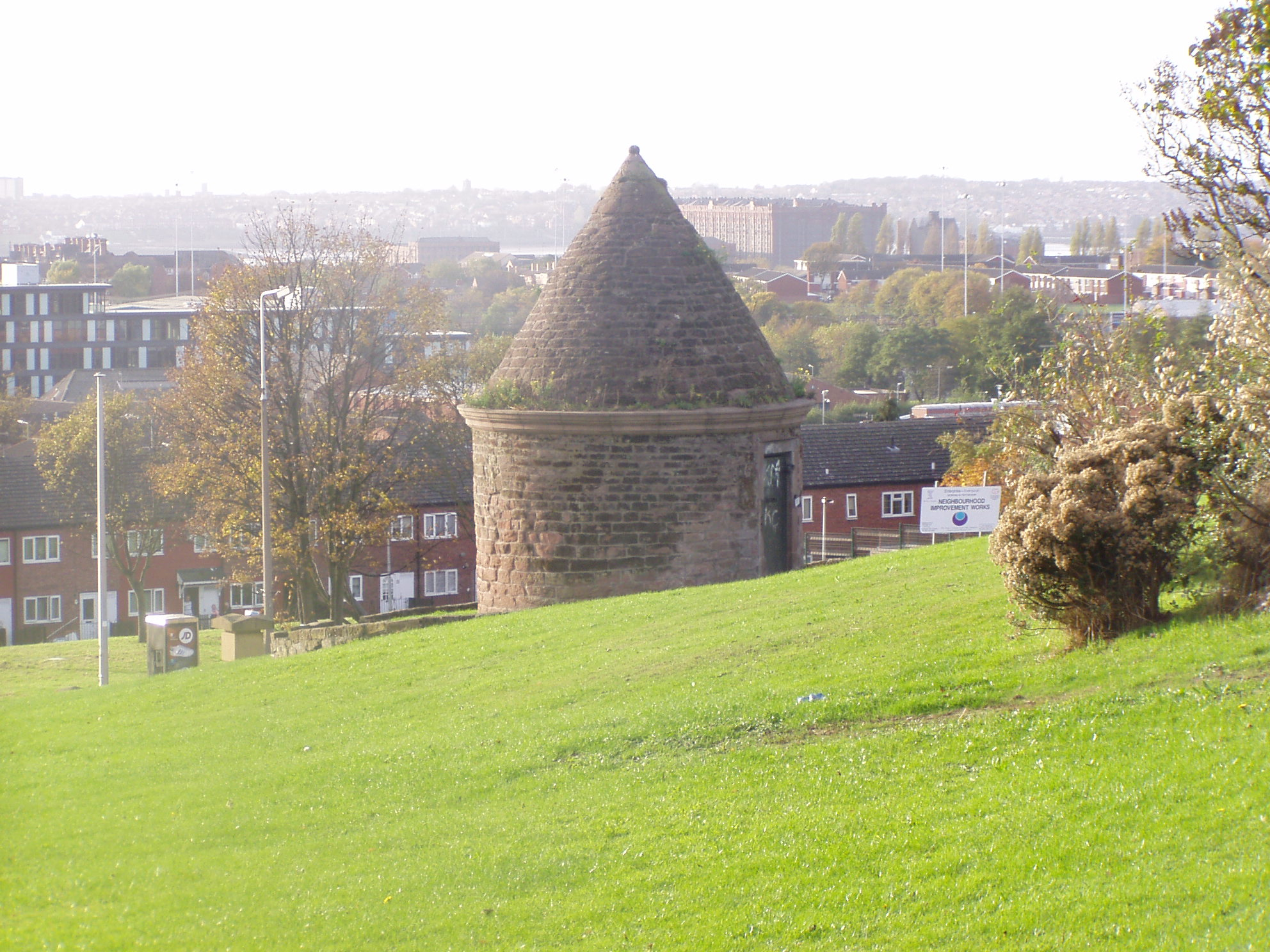
Everton lock-up

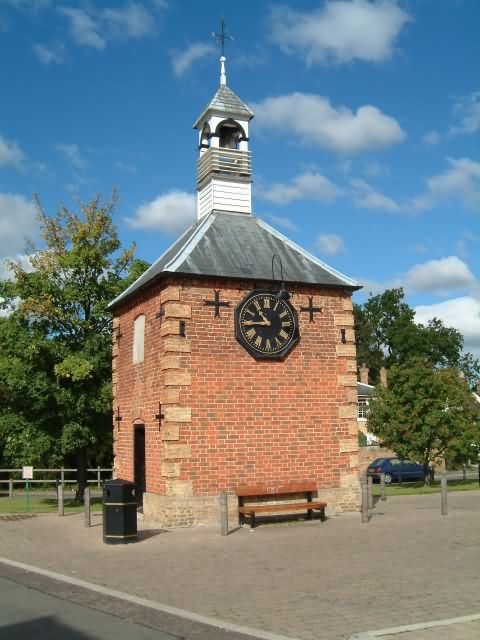
Fenstanton lock-up clock tower

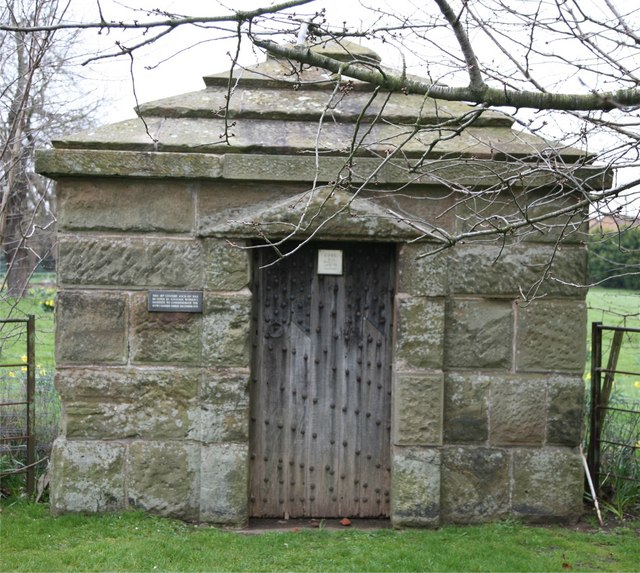
Gnosall lock-up

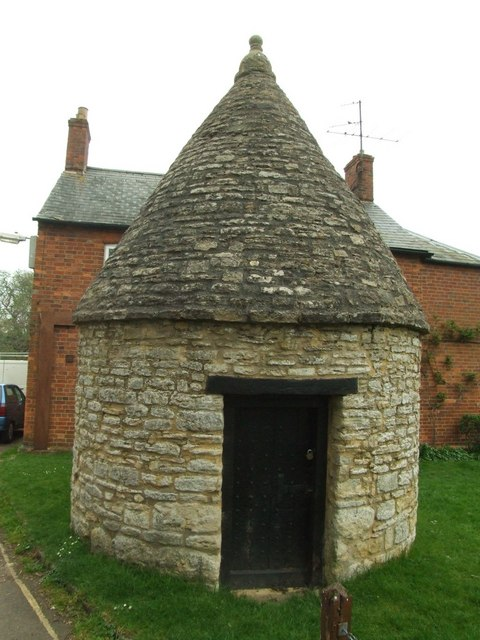
Harrold lock-up

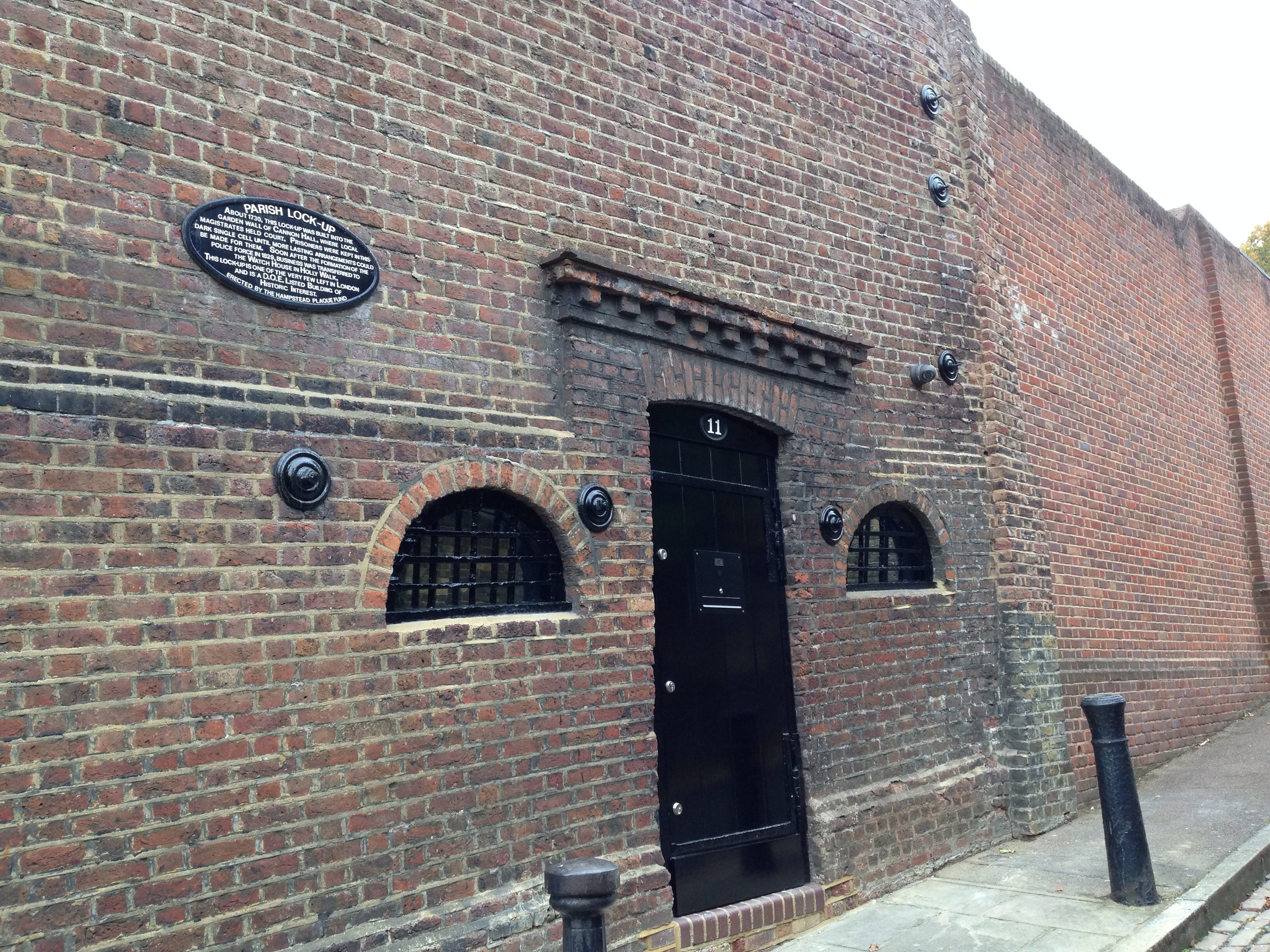
Hampstead lock-up

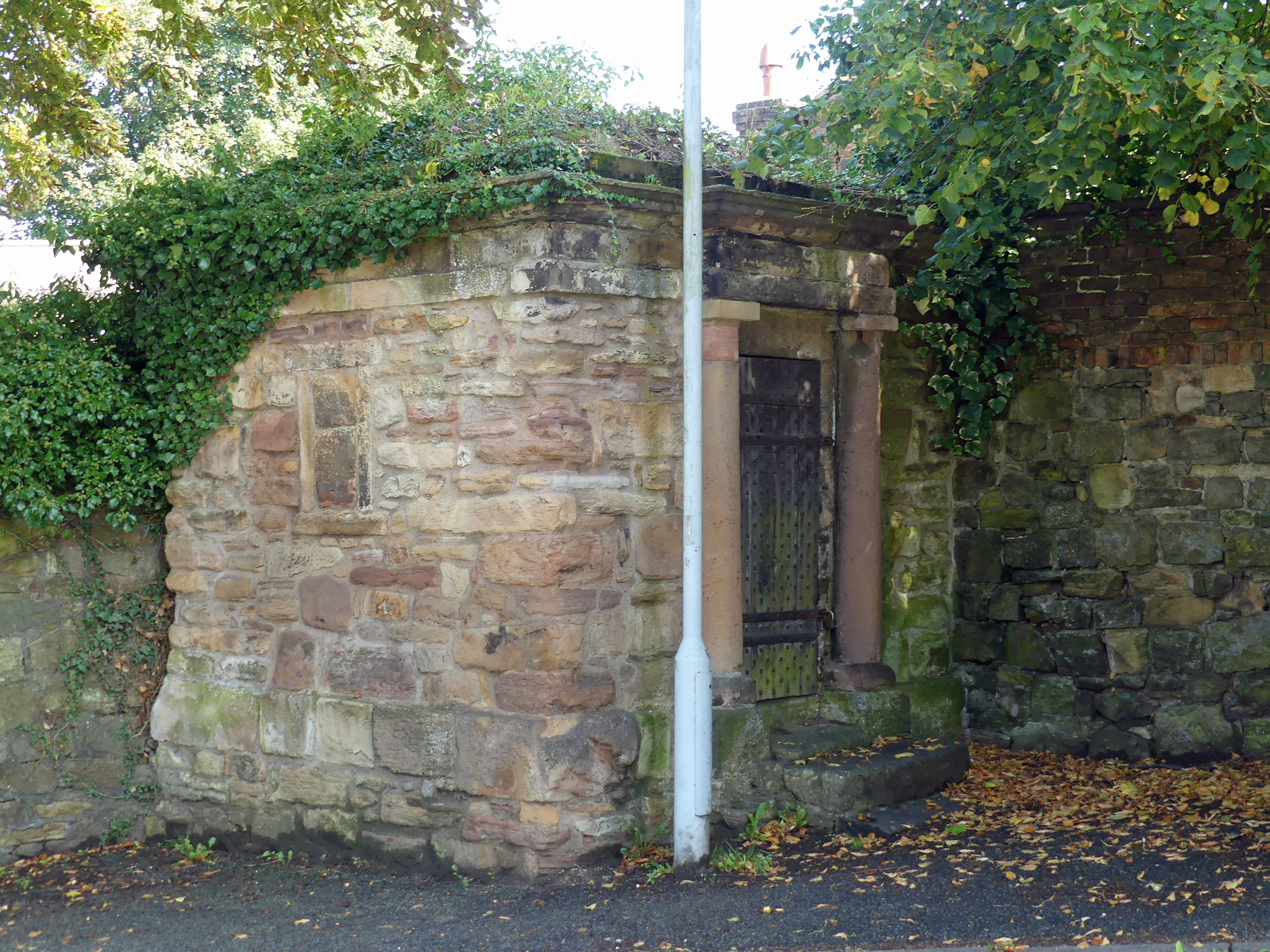
House of Correction, Hawarden

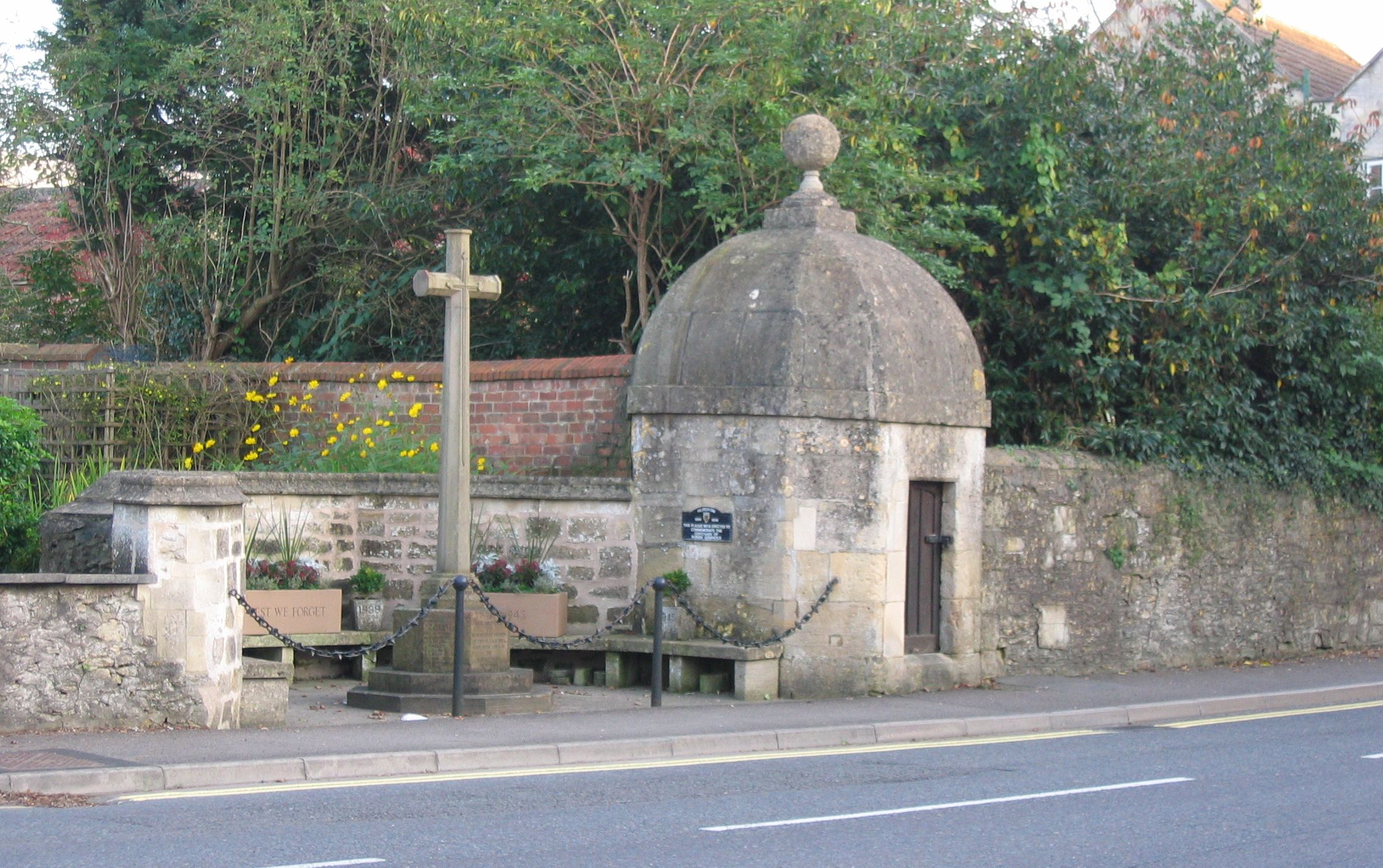
Hilperton lock-up

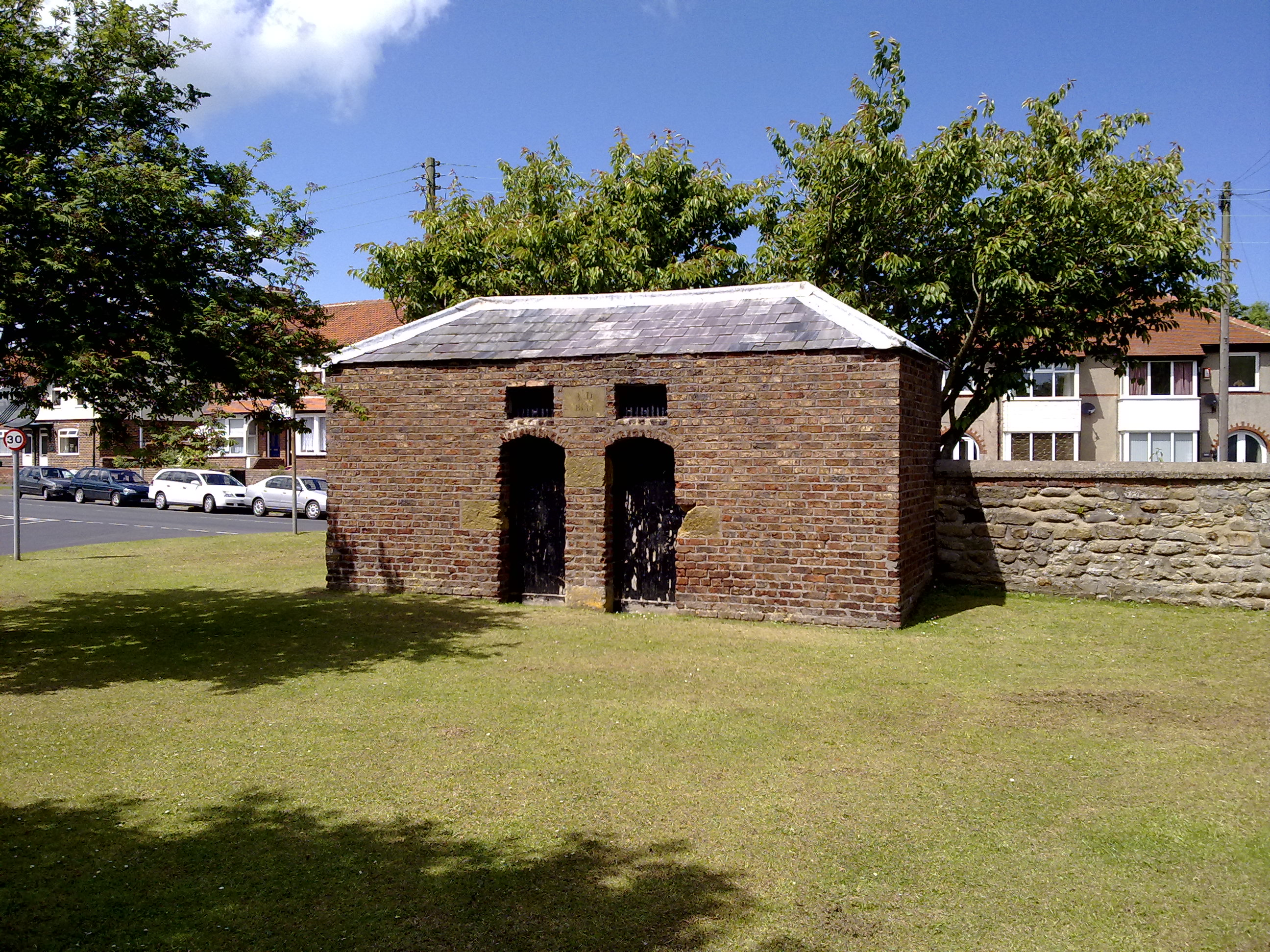
Hunmanby lock-up

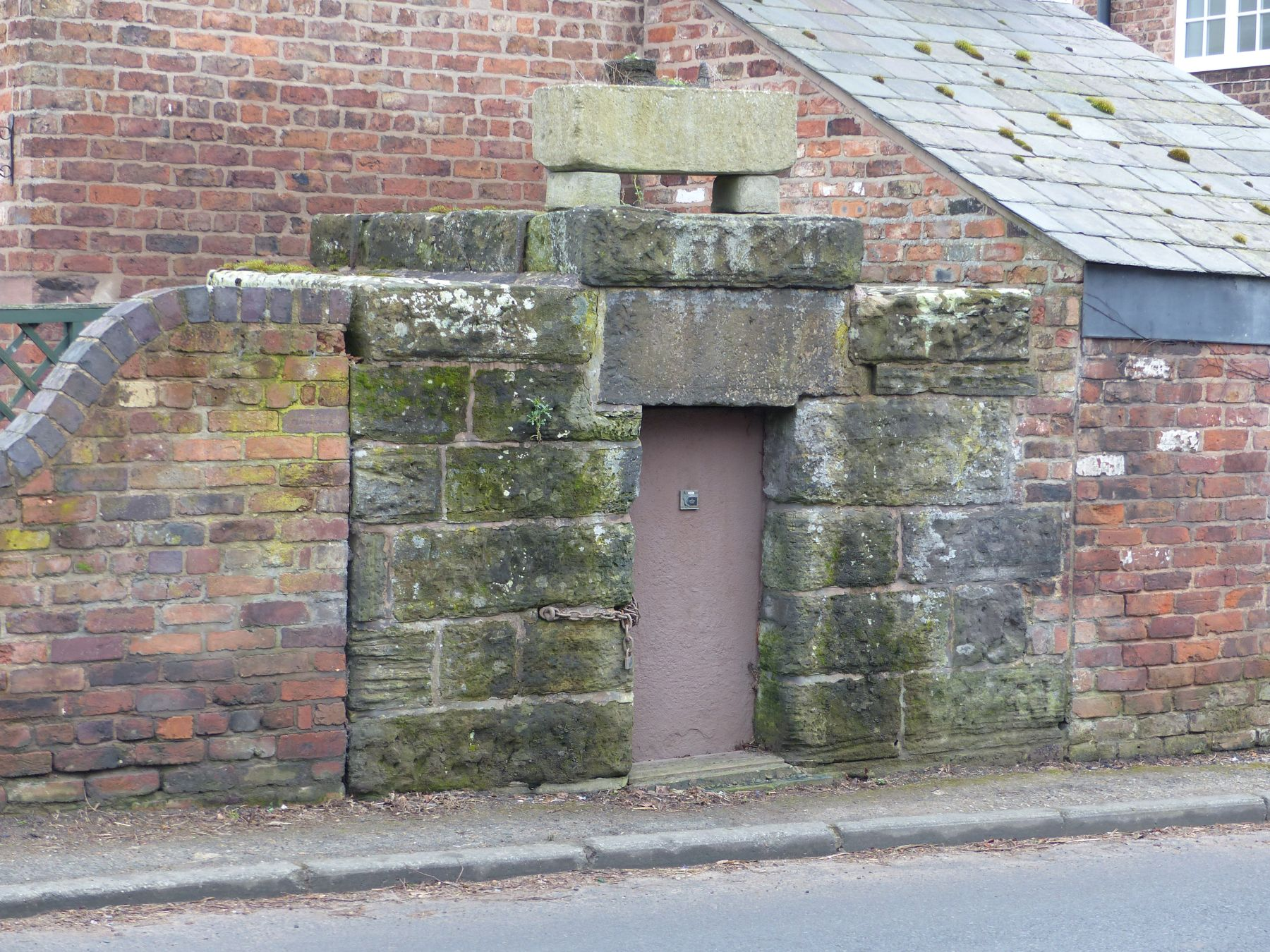
Kelsall lock-up

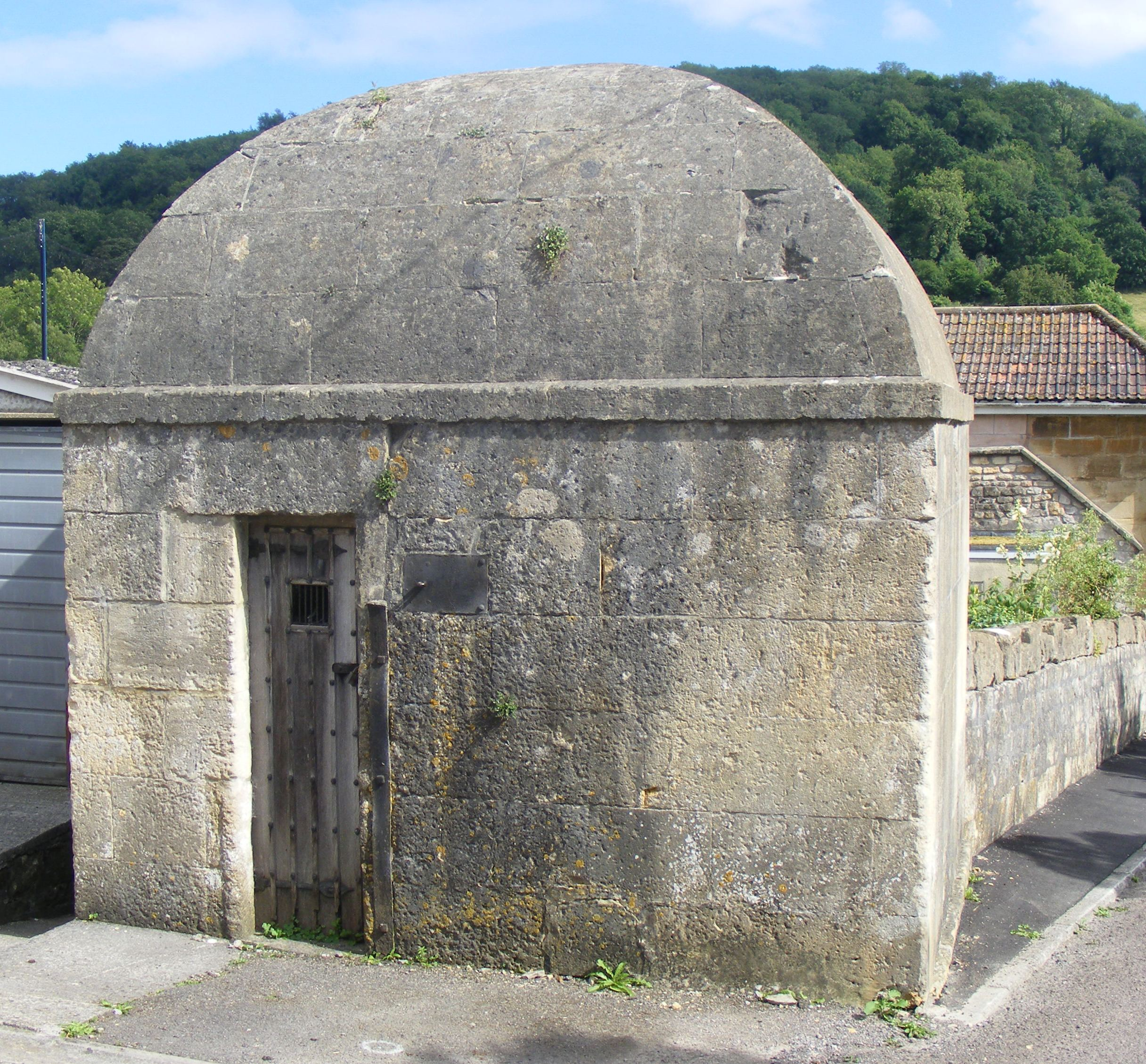
Monkton Combe lock-up

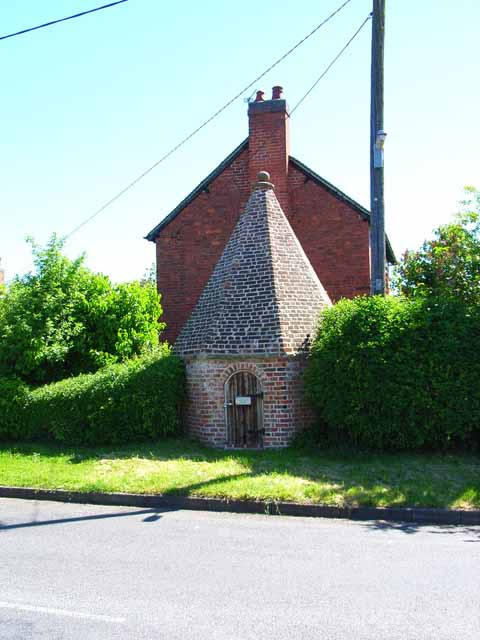
Packington lock-up

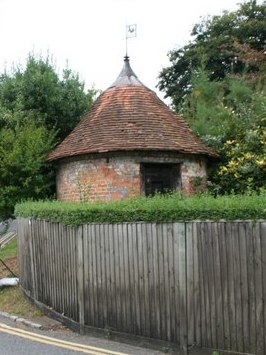
Pangbourne lock-up

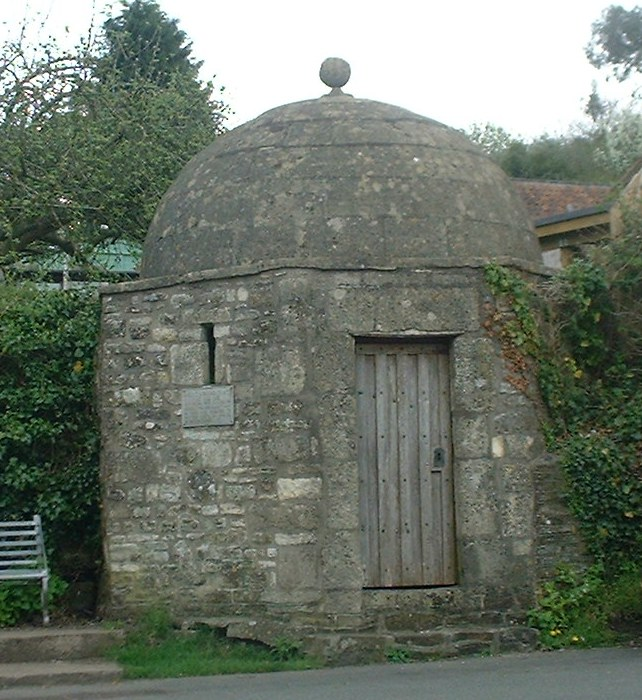
Pensford lock-up

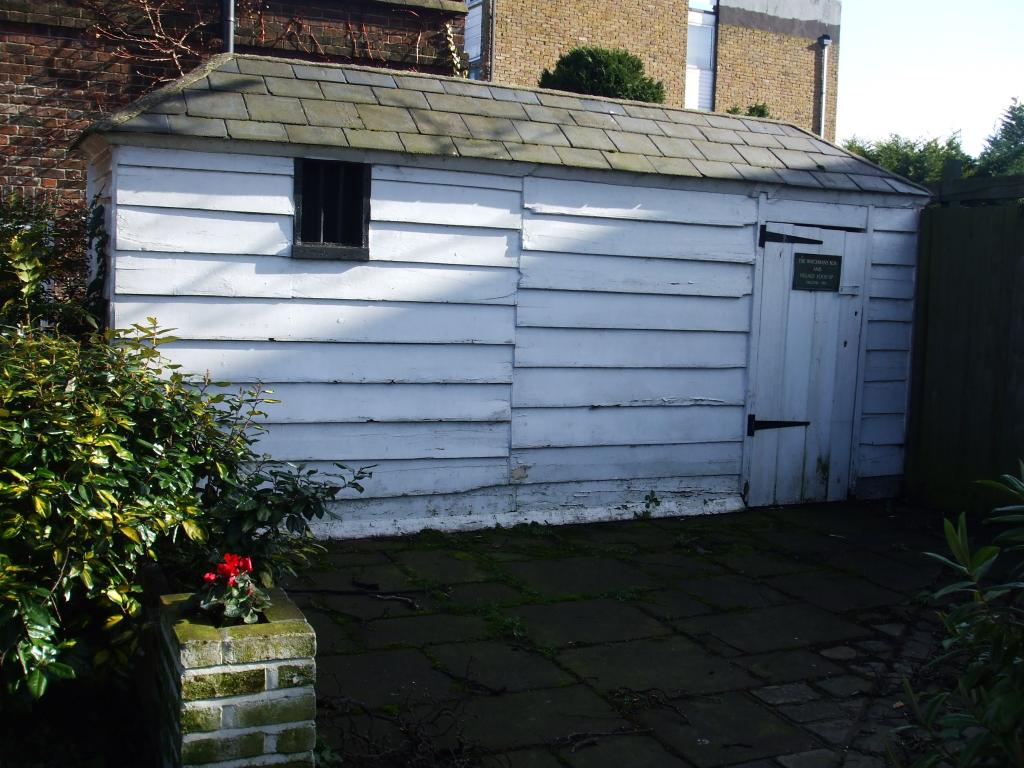
Watchman's hut/lock-up & pound Petersham, London, erected in 1787

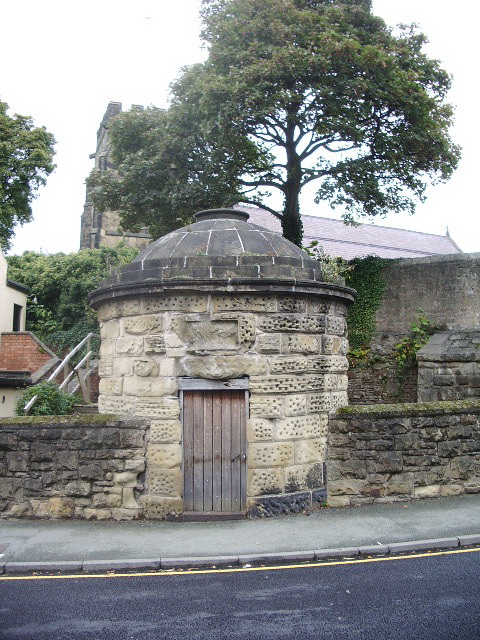
The Roundhouse, Ruabon

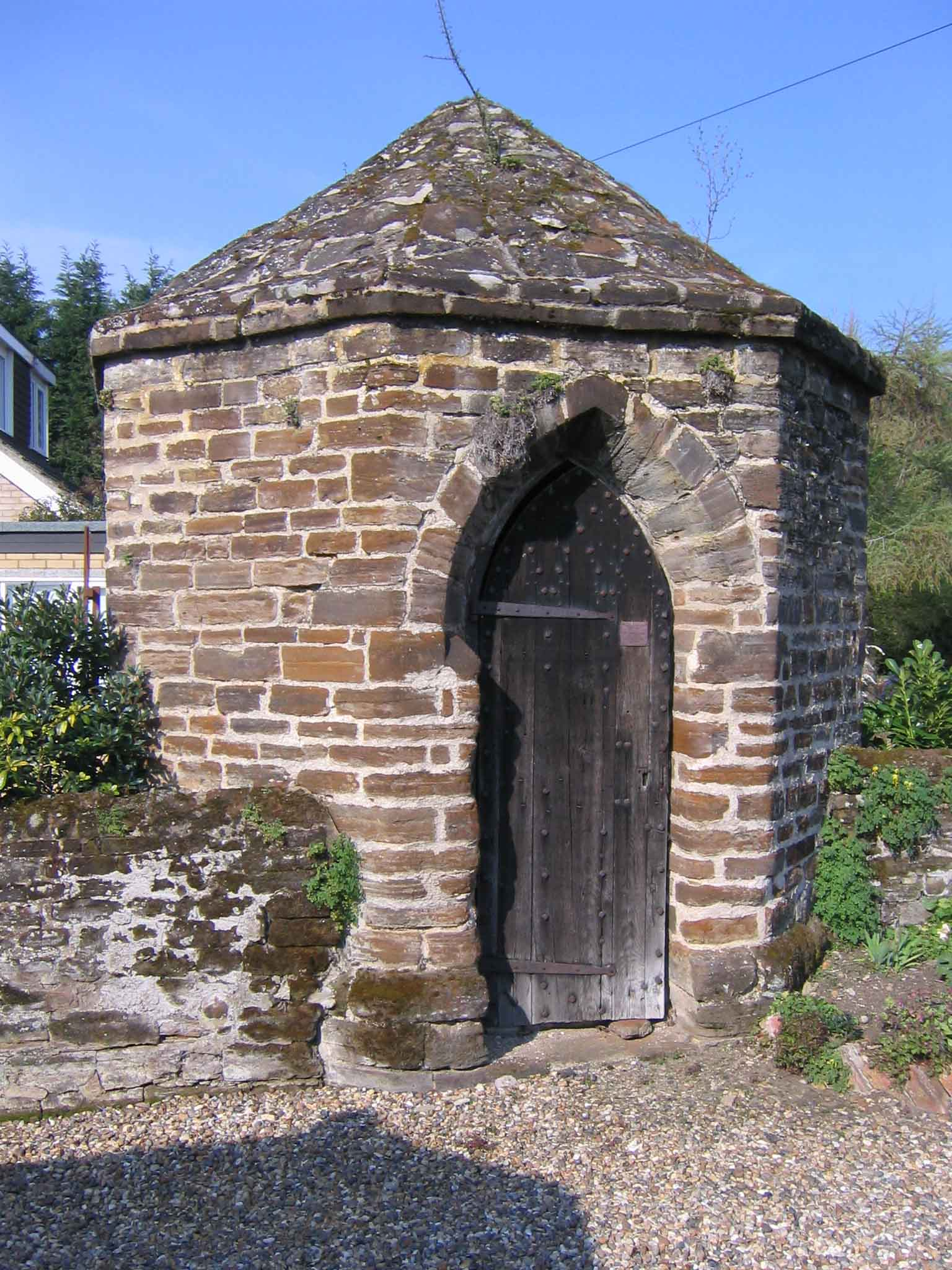
Silsoe lock-up

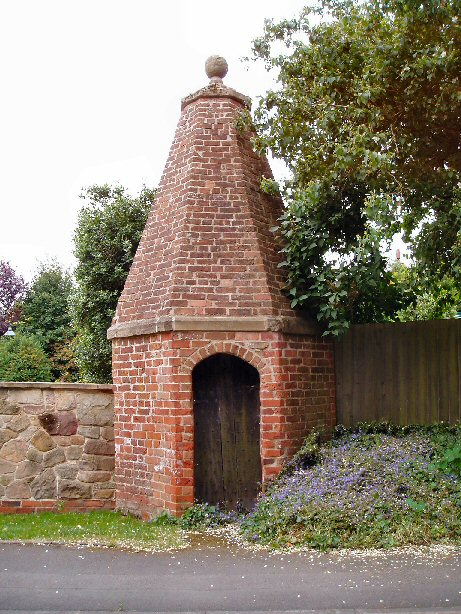
Smisby lock-up

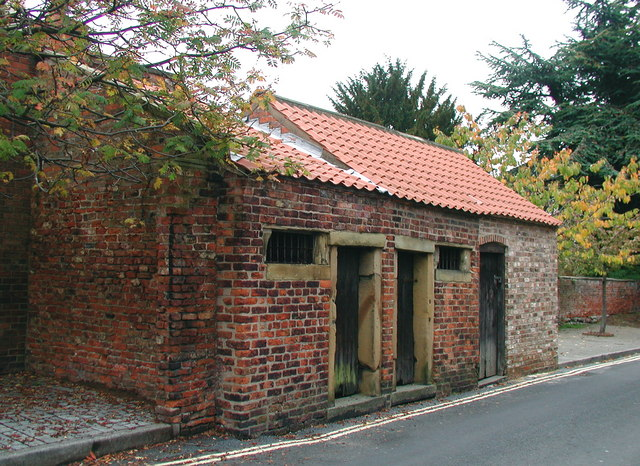
Snaith Town lock-up

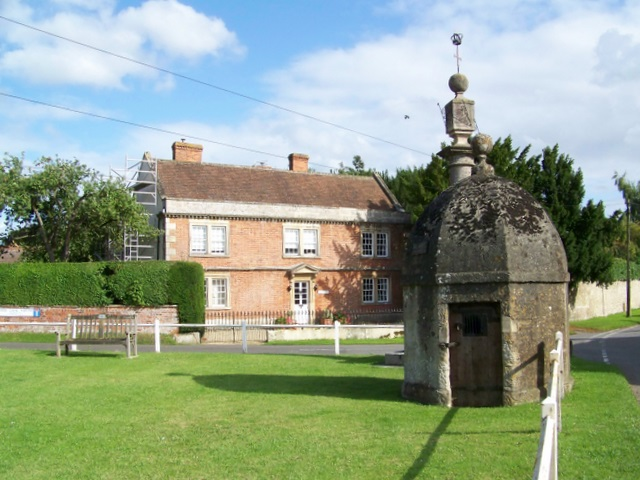
Steeple Ashton lock-up

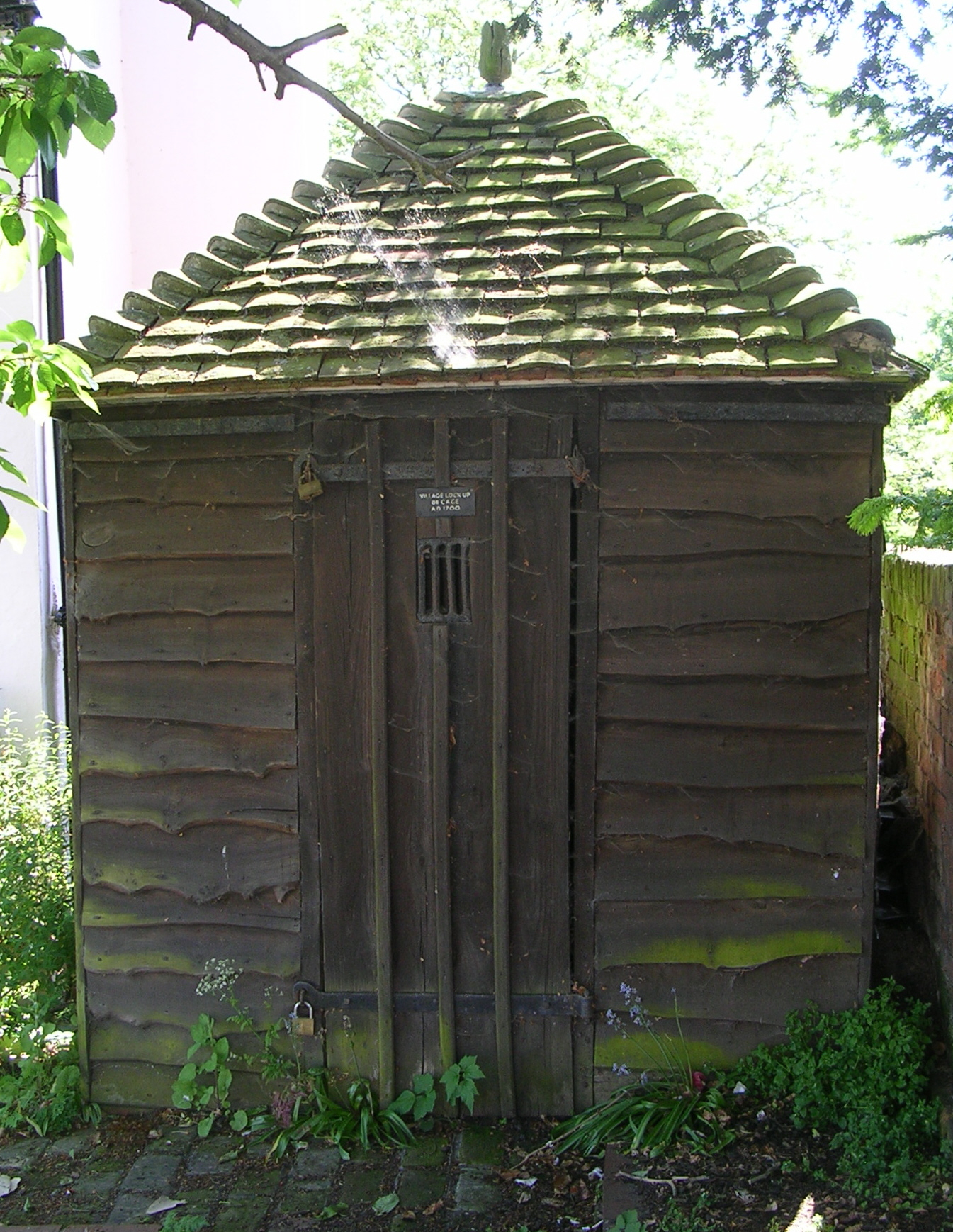
Tollesbury lock-up

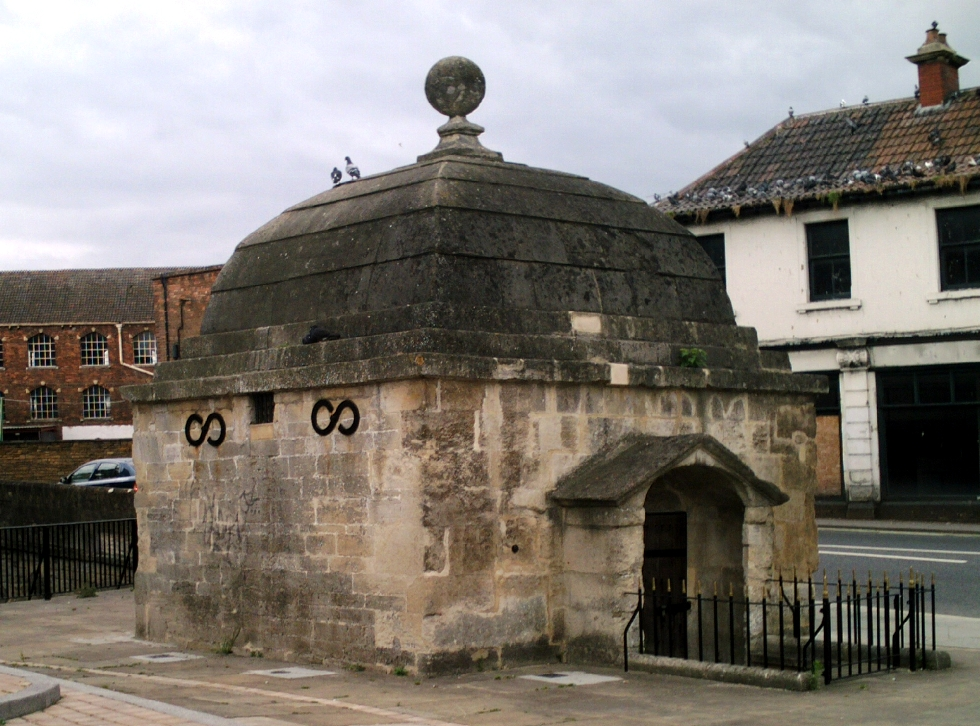
Trowbridge Blind House

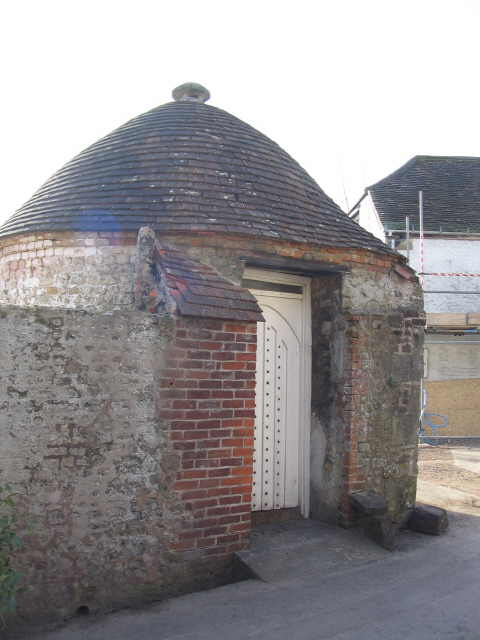
Warminster lock-up

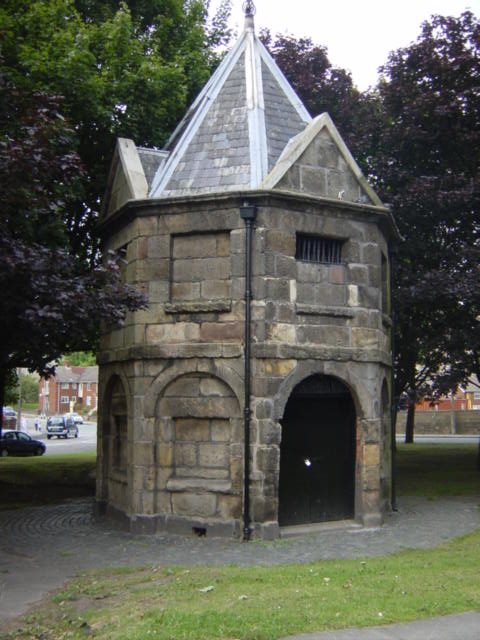
Wavertree lock-up

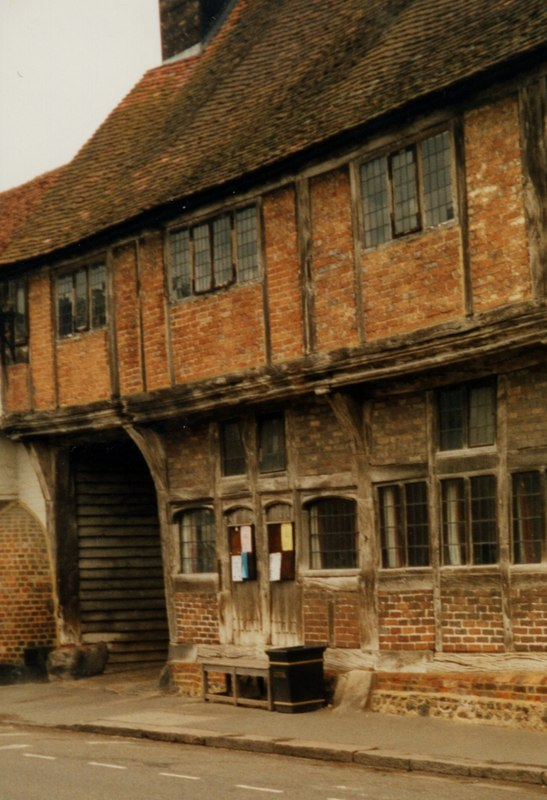
Church Loft, West Wycombe

== See also ==
- Bridewell Palace
- One-room jail
