= List of civil parishes in Derbyshire =

Map of districts: 1. High Peak; 2. Derbyshire Dales; 3. South Derbyshire; 4. Erewash; 5. Amber Valley; 6. North East Derbyshire; 7. Chesterfield; 8. Bolsover; 9. Derby

This is a list of civil parishes in the ceremonial county of Derbyshire, England, divided by district. There are 274 civil parishes.

== Amber Valley ==
Part of the former Alfreton Urban District is unparished.

- Aldercar and Langley Mill (Note: Formerly Heanor Urban District.)
- Alderwasley (Note: Formerly Belper Rural District.)
- Alfreton (town) (Note: Formerly Alfreton Urban District.)
- Ashleyhay
- Belper (town) (Note: Formerly Belper Urban District.)
- Codnor
- Crich
- Denby
- Dethick, Lea and Holloway
- Duffield
- Hazelwood
- Heanor and Loscoe (town)
- Holbrook
- Horsley
- Horsley Woodhouse
- Idridgehay and Alton
- Ironville
- Kedleston
- Kilburn
- Kirk Langley
- Mackworth
- Mapperley
- Pentrich
- Quarndon
- Ravensdale Park
- Ripley (town) (Note: Formerly Ripley Urban District.)
- Shipley
- Shottle and Postern
- Smalley
- Somercotes
- South Wingfield
- Swanwick
- Turnditch
- Weston Underwood
- Windley

== Bolsover District ==
The whole of the district is parished.

- Ault Hucknall (Note: Formerly Blackwell Rural District.)
- Barlborough (Note: Formerly Clowne Rural District.)
- Blackwell
- Clowne
- Elmton with Creswell
- Glapwell
- Hodthorpe and Belph
- Langwith
- Old Bolsover (town) (Note: Formerly Bolsover Urban District.)
- Pinxton
- Pleasley
- Scarcliffe
- Shirebrook (town)
- South Normanton
- Tibshelf
- Whitwell

== Borough of Chesterfield ==
The former Chesterfield Municipal Borough is unparished.

- Brimington (Note: Formerly Chesterfield Rural District.)
- Staveley (town) (Note: Formerly Staveley Urban District.)

== Derby ==
The former Derby County Borough is unparished.

== Derbyshire Dales ==
The whole of the district is parished.

- Abney and Abney Grange (Note: Formerly Bakewell Rural District.)
- Aldwark
- Alkmonton (Note: Formerly Ashbourne Rural District.)
- Ashbourne (town) (Note: Formerly Ashbourne Urban District.)
- Ashford in the Water
- Atlow
- Bakewell (town) (Note: Formerly Bakewell Urban District.)
- Ballidon
- Baslow and Bubnell
- Beeley
- Biggin
- Birchover
- Blackwell in the Peak
- Bonsall (Note: Formerly Matlock Urban District.)
- Boylestone
- Bradbourne
- Bradley
- Bradwell
- Brailsford
- Brassington
- Brushfield
- Callow
- Calver
- Carsington
- Chatsworth
- Chelmorton
- Clifton and Compton
- Cromford
- Cubley
- Curbar
- Darley Dale (town)
- Doveridge
- Eaton and Alsop
- Edensor
- Edlaston and Wyaston
- Elton
- Eyam
- Fenny Bentley
- Flagg
- Foolow
- Frogatt
- Gratton
- Great Hucklow
- Great Longstone
- Grindleford
- Grindlow
- Harthill
- Hartington Middle Quarter
- Hartington Nether Quarter
- Hartington Town Quarter
- Hassop
- Hathersage
- Hazlebadge
- Highlow
- Hognaston
- Hollington
- Hopton
- Hulland
- Hulland Ward
- Hungry Bentley
- Ible
- Ivonbrook Grange
- Kirk Ireton
- Kniveton
- Little Hucklow
- Little Longstone
- Litton
- Longford
- Mapleton
- Marston Montgomery
- Matlock Bath
- Matlock Town (town)
- Mercaston
- Middleton (Note: Formerly Wirksworth Urban District.)
- Middleton and Smerrill
- Monyash
- Nether Haddon
- Newton Grange
- Norbury and Roston
- Northwood and Tinkersley
- Offcote and Underwood
- Offerton
- Osmaston
- Over Haddon
- Parwich
- Pilsley
- Rodsley
- Rowland
- Rowsley
- Sheldon
- Shirley
- Snelston
- Somersal Herbert
- South Darley
- Stanton
- Stoney Middleton
- Sudbury
- Taddington
- Tansley
- Thorpe
- Tideswell
- Tissington and Lea Hall
- Wardlow
- Wheston
- Winster
- Wirksworth (town)
- Yeaveley
- Yeldersley
- Youlgreave

== Borough of Erewash ==
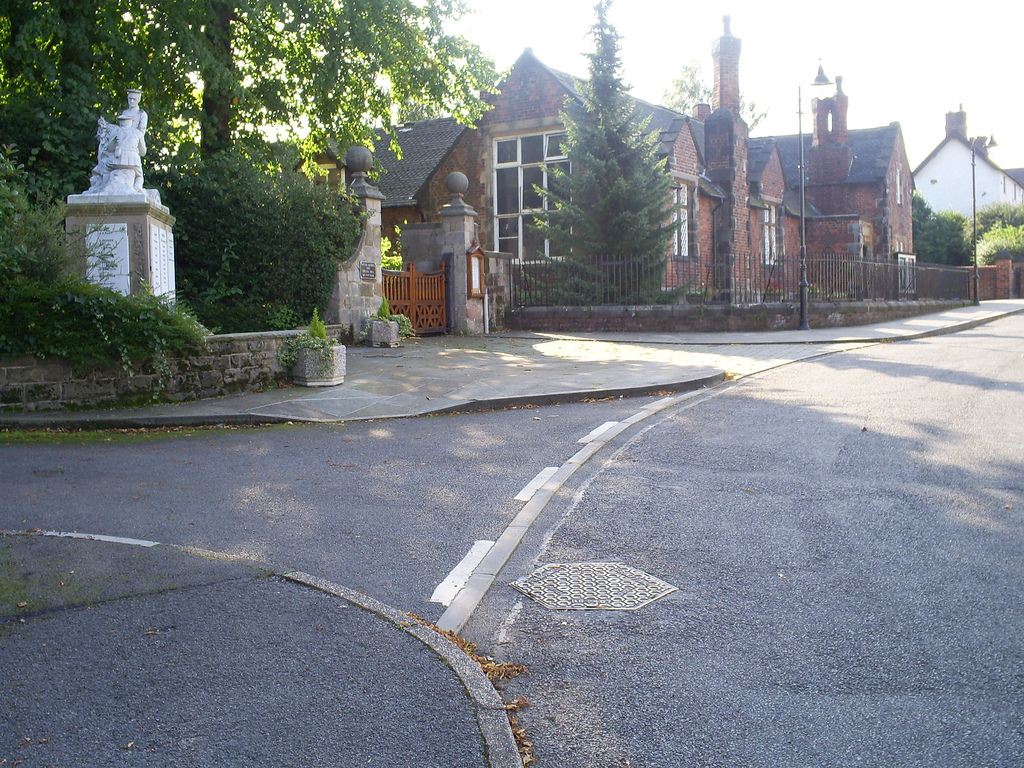
West Hallam

The former Ilkeston Municipal Borough and part of the former Long Eaton Urban District are unparished.

- Breadsall (Note: Formerly South East Derbyshire Rural District.)
- Breaston
- Dale Abbey
- Draycott and Church Wilne
- Hopwell
- Little Eaton
- Morley
- Ockbrook and Borrowash
- Risley
- Sandiacre
- Sawley (Note: Formerly Long Eaton Urban District.)
- Stanley and Stanley Common
- Stanton by Dale
- West Hallam

== High Peak ==
The former Buxton Municipal Borough and Glossop Municipal Borough are unparished.

- Aston (Note: Formerly Chapel en le Frith Rural District.)
- Bamford
- Brough and Shatton
- Castleton
- Chapel-en-le-Frith (town)
- Charlesworth
- Chinley, Buxworth and Brownside
- Chisworth
- Derwent
- Edale
- Green Fairfield
- Hartington Upper Quarter
- Hayfield
- Hope
- Hope Woodlands
- King Sterndale
- New Mills (town) (Note: Formerly New Mills Urban District.)
- Peak Forest
- Thornhill
- Tintwistle (Note: Formerly Tintwistle Rural District.)
- Whaley Bridge (town) (Note: Formerly Whaley Bridge Urban District.)
- Wormhill

== North East Derbyshire ==
The whole of the district is parished.

- Ashover
- Barlow
- Brackenfield
- Brampton
- Calow
- Clay Cross (town) (Note: Formerly Clay Cross Urban District.)
- Dronfield (town) (Note: Formerly Dronfield Urban District.)
- Eckington (town)
- Grassmoor, Hasland and Winsick
- Heath and Holmewood
- Holmesfield
- Holymoorside and Walton
- Killamarsh
- Morton
- North Wingfield
- Pilsley
- Shirland and Higham
- Stretton
- Sutton cum Duckmanton
- Temple Normanton
- Tupton
- Unstone
- Wessington
- Wingerworth

== South Derbyshire ==
The former Swadlincote Urban District is unparished.

- Ash (Note: Formerly Repton Rural District.)
- Aston upon Trent
- Barrow upon Trent
- Barton Blount
- Bearwardcote
- Bretby
- Burnaston
- Calke
- Castle Gresley
- Catton
- Cauldwell
- Church Broughton
- Church Gresley
- Coton in the Elms
- Dalbury Lees
- Drakelow
- Egginton
- Elvaston
- Etwall
- Findern
- Foremark
- Foston and Scropton
- Hartshorne
- Hatton
- Hilton
- Hoon
- Ingleby
- Linton
- Lullington
- Marston on Dove
- Melbourne
- Netherseal
- Newton Solney
- Osleston and Thurvaston
- Overseal
- Radbourne
- Repton
- Rosliston
- Shardlow and Great Wilne
- Smisby
- Stanton by Bridge
- Stenson Fields
- Sutton on the Hill
- Swarkestone
- Ticknall
- Trusley
- Twyford and Stenson
- Walton upon Trent
- Weston-on-Trent
- Willington
- Woodville

== See also ==
- List of civil parishes in England
- List of places in Derbyshire
