= Local boards formed in England and Wales 1848–1894 =

The following is a list of towns in England and Wales which formed local board districts under the Public Health Act 1848 (11 & 12 Vict. c. 63) or local government districts under the Local Government Act 1858.

Note for table:

- 'LBD' stands for local board district
- 'LGD' stands for local government district
- 'RSD' stands for rural sanitary district
- 'UD' stands for urban district
- 'RD' stands for rural district
- 'MB' stands for municipal borough
- 'CB' stands for county borough.

== 1848-58 ==
The districts formed between 1848 and 1858 under the Public Health Act 1848 (11 & 12 Vict. c. 63) were known as local board districts (LBD). Where the territory for a district was not a pre-existing administrative area, such districts were confirmed by local acts of parliament. Districts which were already municipal boroughs where the existing town council was constituted as the local board (e.g. Grimsby) are omitted from this list.

Local board district	County	Created	Abolished	Successor(s)
Luton	Bedfordshire	1850	1877	Luton MB
Brynmawr	Brecknockshire	1851	1894	Brynmawr UD
Aylesbury	Buckinghamshire	1849	1894	Aylesbury UD
Beaconsfield	Buckinghamshire	1850	1894	Beaconsfield UD
Eton	Buckinghamshire	1849	1894	Eton UD
Bangor	Caernarfonshire	1850	1883	Bangor MB
Ely	Cambridgeshire (1850–89); Isle of Ely (1889–94)	1850	1894	Ely UD
March	Cambridgeshire (1851–89); Isle of Ely (1889–94)	1851	1894	March UD
Llanelly (Llanelli)	Carmarthenshire	1850	1894	Llanelly UD
Altrincham	Cheshire	1851	1894	Altrincham UD
Dukinfield	Cheshire	1857	1894	Dukinfield UD
Nantwich	Cheshire	1850	1894	Nantwich UD
Wallasey	Cheshire	1853	1894	Wallasey UD
Redruth	Cornwall	1853	1894	Redruth UD
Keswick	Cumberland	1853	1894	Keswick UD
Penrith	Cumberland	1851	1894	Penrith UD
Llangollen	Denbighshire	1857	1894	Llangollen UD
Alfreton	Derbyshire	1851	1894	Alfreton UD
Alvaston and Boulton	Derbyshire	1851	1894	Alvaston and Boulton UD
Heanor	Derbyshire	1850	1894	Heanor UD
Exmouth	Devon	1850	1894	Exmouth UD
Ilfracombe	Devon	1851	1894	Ilfracombe UD
Ottery St Mary	Devon	1850	1894	Ottery St Mary UD
St Thomas the Apostle	Devon	1849	1894	St Thomas the Apostle UD
Torquay ("Tormoham" 1850–1876)	Devon	1850	1892	Torquay MB
Sherborne	Dorset	1851	1894	Sherborne UD
Barnard Castle	County Durham	1850	1894	Barnard Castle UD
Bishop Auckland	County Durham	1854	1894	Bishop Auckland UD
Darlington	County Durham	1850	1867	Darlington MB
Houghton-le-Spring	County Durham	1854	1894	Houghton-le-Spring UD
Braintree	Essex	1850	1894	Braintree UD
Chelmsford	Essex	1850	1888	Chelmsford MB
Halstead	Essex	1852	1894	Halstead UD
Romford	Essex	1851	1894	Romford UD
Waltham Holy Cross	Essex	1850	1894	Waltham Holy Cross UD
Wanstead	Essex	1854	1894	Wanstead UD
Witham	Essex	1852	1894	Witham UD
Aberdare	Glamorgan	1854	1894	Aberdare UD
Bridgend	Glamorgan	1851	1894	Bridgend UD
Maesteg ("Cwmdu" 1858–1877)	Glamorgan	1858	1894	Maesteg UD
Merthyr Tydfil	Glamorgan	1850	1894	Merthyr Tydfil UD
Stroud	Gloucestershire	1857	1894	Stroud UD
Aldershot	Hampshire	1857	1894	Aldershot UD
West Cowes	Hampshire (1851–1890); Isle of Wight (1890–1894)	1851	1894	West Cowes UD
Fareham	Hampshire	1849	1894	Fareham UD
Havant	Hampshire	1852	1894	Havant UD
Shirley and Freemantle ("Shirley" 1853–1881)	Hampshire	1853	1894	Shirley and Freemantle UD
Cheshunt	Hertfordshire	1850	1894	Cheshunt UD
Hitchin	Hertfordshire	1850	1858	Board became defunct.
Ware	Hertfordshire	1849	1894	Ware UD
Watford	Hertfordshire	1850	1894	Watford UD
Chatham	Kent	1849	1890	Chatham MB
Dartford	Kent	1850	1894	Dartford UD
Margate	Kent	1851	1857	Margate MB
Sandgate	Kent	1850	1894	Sandgate UD
Sheerness	Kent	1849	1894	Sheerness UD
Woolwich	Kent (1852–89); London (1889–1900)	1852	1900	Woolwich MetB
Barton, Eccles, Winton and Monton	Lancashire	1854	1892	Eccles MB
Blackpool ("Layton with Warbreck" 1851–1868)	Lancashire	1851	1876	Blackpool MB
Denton ("Denton and Haughton" 1884–1894)	Lancashire	1857	1894	Denton UD
Garston	Lancashire	1854	1894	Garston UD
Kirkham	Lancashire	1852	1894	Kirkham UD
Morecambe ("Poulton, Bare and Torrisholme" 1852–1889)	Lancashire	1852	1894	Morecambe UD
Moss Side	Lancashire	1856	1894	Moss Side UD
Ormskirk	Lancashire	1850	1894	Ormskirk UD
Waterloo with Seaforth	Lancashire	1856	1894	Waterloo with Seaforth UD
Wavertree	Lancashire	1851	1894	Wavertree UD
Ashby-de-la-Zouch	Leicestershire	1850	1894	Ashby-de-la-Zouch UD
Loughborough	Leicestershire	1850	1888	Loughborough MB
Thurmaston	Leicestershire	1851	1894	Thurmaston UD
Holbeach	Lincolnshire (1850–89); Holland (1889–94)	1850	1894	Holbeach UD
Gainsborough	Lincolnshire (1852–89); Lindsey (1889–94)	1852	1894	Gainsborough UD
New Sleaford	Lincolnshire (1850–89); Kesteven (1889–94)	1850	1894	New Sleaford UD
Towyn (Tywyn)	Merioneth	1851	1894	Towyn UD
Edmonton	Middlesex	1850	1894	Edmonton UD
Enfield	Middlesex	1850	1894	Enfield UD
Harrow on the Hill	Middlesex	1850	1894	Harrow on the Hill UD
Tottenham	Middlesex	1850	1894	Tottenham UD
Uxbridge	Middlesex	1849	1894	Uxbridge UD
Diss	Norfolk	1850	1894	Diss UD
Walsoken	Norfolk	1852	1894	Walsoken UD
Wellingborough	Northamptonshire	1855	1894	Wellingborough UD
Alnwick and Canongate	Northumberland	1850	1894	Alnwick and Canongate UD
Hexham	Northumberland	1853	1894	Hexham UD
Arnold	Nottinghamshire	1854	1894	Arnold UD
Worksop	Nottinghamshire	1852	1894	Worksop UD
Wheatley	Oxfordshire	1857	1894	Wheatley UD
Knighton	Radnorshire	1850	1894	Knighton UD
Burnham	Somerset	1850	1894	Burnham UD
Clevedon	Somerset	1853	1894	Clevedon UD
Street	Somerset	1853	1894	Street UD
Taunton	Somerset	1849	1885	Taunton MB
Burslem	Staffordshire	1850	1878	Burslem MB
Smethwick	Staffordshire	1856	1894	Smethwick UD
Tipton	Staffordshire	1855	1894	Tipton UD
Tunstall	Staffordshire	1855	1894	Tunstall UD
Wednesbury	Staffordshire	1851	1886	Wednesbury MB
Willenhall	Staffordshire	1854	1894	Willenhall UD
Newmarket	Suffolk and Cambridgeshire (1851–89); West Suffolk (1889–1894)	1851	1894	Newmarket UD
Croydon	Surrey	1849	1883	Croydon MB
Epsom	Surrey	1850	1894	Epsom UD
Battle	Sussex (1851–89); East Sussex (1889–94)	1851	1894	Battle UD
Worthing	Sussex (1852–89); West Sussex (1889–90)	1852	1890	Worthing MB
Littlehampton	Sussex (1853–89); West Sussex (1889–94)	1853	1894	Littlehampton UD
Bulkington	Warwickshire	1850	1894	Bulkington UD
Chilvers Coton	Warwickshire	1850	1893	Nuneaton and Chilvers Coton LBD
Nuneaton ("Nuneaton and Chilvers Coton" 1893–1894)	Warwickshire	1850	1893	Nuneaton and Chilvers Coton UD
Royal Leamington Spa	Warwickshire	1852	1875	Royal Leamington Spa MB
Rugby	Warwickshire	1849	1894	Rugby UD
Oldbury	Worcestershire	1857	1894	Oldbury UD
Malton	Yorkshire (1854–89); North Riding of Yorkshire (1889–94)	1854	1894	Malton UD
Northallerton	Yorkshire (1851–89); North Riding of Yorkshire (1889–94)	1851	1894	Northallerton UD
Redcar	Yorkshire (1855–89); North Riding of Yorkshire (1889–94)	1855	1894	Redcar UD
Baildon	Yorkshire (1852–89); West Riding of Yorkshire (1889–94)	1852	1894	Baildon UD
Batley	Yorkshire	1853	1868	Batley MB
Burley in Wharfedale	Yorkshire (1854–89); West Riding of Yorkshire (1889–94)	1854	1894	Burley in Wharfedale UD
Castleford	Yorkshire (1851–89); West Riding of Yorkshire (1889–94)	1851	1894	Castleford UD
Eccleshill	Yorkshire (1855–89); West Riding of Yorkshire (1889–94)	1851	1894	Eccleshill UD
Elland	Yorkshire (1853–89); West Riding of Yorkshire (1889–94)	1853	1894	Elland UD
Haworth	Yorkshire (1851–89); West Riding of Yorkshire (1889–94)	1851	1894	Haworth UD
Heckmondwike	Yorkshire (1853–89); West Riding of Yorkshire (1889–94)	1853	1894	Heckmondwike UD
Selby	Yorkshire (1851–89); West Riding of Yorkshire (1889–94)	1851	1894	Selby UD
Shipley	Yorkshire (1853–89); West Riding of Yorkshire (1889–94)	1853	1894	Shipley UD

== 1858-69 ==
Local government district	County	Created	Abolished	Successor(s)
East Vale LGD	Staffordshire	1858	1883	absorbed by Longton MB
Fairfield LGD	Derbyshire	1858	1894	Fairfield UD
Lindfield LGD	Sussex	1858	1884	absorbed by Cuckfield RSD
Crewe ("Monks Coppenhall" 1859–1869)	Cheshire	1859	1877	Crewe MB
Dunstable LGD	Bedfordshire	1863	1864	Dunstable MB
Redditch LGD	Worcestershire and Warwickshire (1858–89), Worcestershire (1889–94)	1858	1894	Redditch UD
Bicester King's End LGD	Oxfordshire	1859	1875	Bicester LGD
Bideford LGD	Devon	1859	18??	merged with Bideford MB
Boston LGD	Lincolnshire	1859	18??	merged with Boston MB
East Cowes LGD	Hampshire (1859–89), Isle of Wight (1889–94)	1859	1894	East Cowes UD
Ellesmere LGD	Shropshire	1859	1894	Ellesmere UD
Hanley LGD	Staffordshire	1859	18??	merged with Hanley MB
Higher Bebington LGD	Cheshire	1859	1894	Higher Bebington UD
Marlborough LGD†	Wiltshire	1859	18??	merged with Marlborough MB
Sutton Bridge LGD	Lincolnshire (1859–89), Lincolnshire, Parts of Holland (1889–94)	1859	1894	Sutton Bridge UD
Teignmouth LGD	Devon	1859	1894	Teignmouth UD
Tring LGD	Hertfordshire	1859	1894	Tring UD
Uckfield LGD	Sussex (1859–89), East Sussex (1889–94)	1859	1894	Uckfield UD
Weston-super-Mare LGD	Somerset	1859	1894	Weston-super-Mare UD
Wiveliscombe LGD	Somerset	1859	1894	Wiveliscombe UD
Alton LGD	Hampshire	1860	1894	Alton UD
Cuckfield LGD	Sussex (1860–89), East Sussex (1889–94)	1860	1894	Cuckfield UD
Dawlish LGD	Devon	1860	1894	Dawlish UD
Long Sutton LGD	Lincolnshire (1860–89), Lincolnshire, Parts of Holland (1889–94)	1860	1894	Long Sutton UD
Melton Mowbray LGD	Leicestershire	1860	1894	Melton Mowbray UD
Tunbridge Wells LGD	Kent and Sussex	1860	1889	Tunbridge Wells MB
Whitchurch and Dodington LGD	Shropshire	1860	1894	Whitchurch and Dodington UD
Bedlingtonshire LGD	Northumberland	1861	1894	Bedlingtonshire UD
Blaydon LGD	County Durham	1861	1894	Blaydon UD
Bromsgrove Town LGD	Worcestershire	1861	1894	Bromsgrove Town UD
Dronfield LGD	Derbyshire	1861	1894	Dronfield UD
Whittington LGD	Derbyshire	1861	1894	Whittington UD
Balsall Heath LGD	Worcestershire	1862	1891	absorbed by Birmingham CB, Warks.
Bicester Market End LGD	Oxfordshire	1862	1875	Bicester LGD
Bollington LGD	Cheshire	1862	1894	Bollington UD
Chorley LGD	Cheshire	1862	1894	Alderley Edge UD
Kirklington with Upsland LGD	Yorkshire (1862–89), North Riding of Yorkshire (1889–94)	1862	1894	Kirklington cum Upsland UD
Lower Brixham LGD	Devon	1862	1894	Lower Brixham UD
Sandbach LGD	Cheshire	1862	1894	Sandbach UD
Ashford LGD	Kent	1863	1894	Ashford UD
Awre LGD	Gloucestershire	1863	1894	Awre UD
Bakewell LGD	Derbyshire	1863	1894	Bakewell UD
Barnet LGD	Hertfordshire and Middlesex (1863–89), Hertfordshire (1889–94)	1863	1894	Barnet UD
Barton St Mary LGD	Gloucestershire	1863	1874	absorbed by Gloucester MB
Barton St Michael LGD	Gloucestershire	1863	1874	absorbed by Gloucester MB
Barton-upon-Humber LGD	Lincolnshire (1863–89), Lincolnshire, Parts of Lindsey (1889–94)	1863	1894	Barton-upon-Humber UD
Baslow LGD	Derbyshire	1863	1894	Baslow and Bubnell UD
Bonsall LGD	Derbyshire	1863	1894	Bonsall UD
Bridlington LGD	Yorkshire (1863–89), East Riding of Yorkshire (1889–94)	1863	1894	Bridlington UD
Bromsgrove Country LGD	Worcestershire	1863	1894	Bromsgrove Country UD
Buglawton LGD	Cheshire	1863	1894	Buglawton UD
Cockermouth LGD	Cumberland	1863	1894	Cockermouth UD
Cottingham LGD	Yorkshire (1863–89), East Riding of Yorkshire (1889–94)	1863	1894	Cottingham UD
Dresden LGD	Staffordshire	1863	1884	absorbed by Longton MB
Ealing LGD	Middlesex	1863	1894	Ealing UD
Fenton LGD	Staffordshire	1863	1894	Fenton UD
Hampton Wick LGD	Middlesex	1863	1894	Hampton Wick UD
Heage LGD	Derbyshire	1863	1894	Heage UD
Hollingworth LGD	Cheshire	1863	1894	Hollingworth UD
Holme Cultram LGD	Cumberland	1863	1894	Holme Cultram UD
Lower Bebington LGD	Cheshire	1863	1894	Lower Bebington UD
Stourport ("Lower Mitton" 1863–1889)	Worcestershire	1863	1894	Stourport UD
Lymm LGD	Cheshire	1863	1894	Lymm UD
Madron LGD	Cornwall	1863	1894	Madron UD
Masham LGD	Yorkshire (1863–89), North Riding of Yorkshire (1889–94)	1863	1894	Masham UD
Newnham LGD	Gloucestershire	1863	1894	Newnham UD
North Darley (Darley Dale) LGD	Derbyshire	1863	1894	North Darley UD
Northwich LGD	Cheshire	1863	1894	Northwich UD
Oswestry LGD	Shropshire	1863	18??	merged with Oswestry MB
Paignton LGD	Devon	1863	1894	Paignton UD
Pickering LGD	Yorkshire (1863–89), North Riding of Yorkshire (1889–94)	1863	1894	Pickering UD
Roxby cum Risby LGD	Lincolnshire (1863–89), Lincolnshire, Parts of Lindsey (1889–94)	1863	1894	Roxby cum Risby UD
Ryton LGD	County Durham	1863	1894	Ryton UD
Seghill LGD	Northumberland	1863	1894	Seghill UD
Shanklin LGD	Hampshire (1863–89), Isle of Wight (1889–94)	1863	1894	Shanklin UD
Sidmouth LGD	Devon	1863	1894	Sidmouth UD
Sittingbourne LGD	Kent	1863	1894	Sittingbourne UD
South Blyth LGD	Northumberland	1863	1894	Blyth UD
South Darley LGD	Derbyshire	1863	1894	South Darley UD
South Hornsey LGD	Middlesex	1863	1894	South Hornsey UD
Southwick on Wear LGD	County Durham	1863	1894	Southwick on Wear UD
Slough LGD	Buckinghamshire	1863	1894	Slough UD
Tow Law LGD	County Durham	1863	1894	Tow Law UD
Warsop LGD	Nottinghamshire	1863	1894	Warsop UD
Wednesfield LGD	Staffordshire	1863	1894	Wednesfield UD
Westbury on Severn LGD	Gloucestershire	1863	1894	Westbury on Severn UD
Willington Quay LGD	Northumberland	1863	1894	Willington Quay UD
Winterton LGD	Lincolnshire (1863–89), Lincolnshire, Parts of Lindsey (1889–94)	1863	1894	Winterton UD
Witney LGD	Oxfordshire	1863	1894	Witney UD
Wrotham LGD	Kent	1863	1894	Wrotham UD
Bisley LGD	Gloucestershire	1864	1894	Stroud RD
Bowdon LGD	Cheshire	1864	1894	Bowdon UD
Brigg (Glanford Brigg) LGD	Lincolnshire (1864–89), Lincolnshire, Parts of Lindsey (1889–94)	1864	1894	Brigg UD
Broughton LGD	Lincolnshire (1864–89), Lincolnshire, Parts of Lindsey (1889–94)	1864	1894	Broughton UD
Cleator Moor LGD	Cumberland	1864	1894	Cleator Moor UD
Cowpen LGD	Northumberland	1864	1894	Cowpen UD
Grantham LGD	Lincolnshire	1864	18??	merged with Grantham MB
Harborne LGD	Staffordshire	1864	1891	absorbed by Birmingham CB, Warks.
Hoole LGD	Cheshire	1864	1894	Hoole UD
Howden Panns LGD	Northumberland	1864	1894	absorbed by Willington Quay UD
Ludgvan LGD	Cornwall	1864	1894	Ludgvan UD
New Swindon LGD	Wiltshire	1864	1894	Swindon New Town UD
Old Swindon LGD	Wiltshire	1864	1894	Old Swindon UD
Oxford LGD	Oxfordshire and Berkshire	1864	1889	absorbed by Oxford CB
Padstow LGD	Cornwall	1866	1894	Padstow UD
Quorndon LGD	Leicestershire	1864	1894	Quorndon UD
Ruskington LGD	Lincolnshire (1864–89), Lincolnshire, Parts of Kesteven (1889–94)	1864	1894	Ruskington UD
Smallthorne LGD	Staffordshire	1864	1894	Smallthorne UD
Spennymoor LGD	County Durham	1864	1894	Spennymoor UD
St Austell LGD	Cornwall	1864	1894	St Austell UD
Trowbridge LGD	Wiltshire	1864	1894	Trowbridge UD
Whitwick LGD	Leicestershire	1864	1892	Absorbed into Coalville UD
Wolborough LGD	Devon	1864	1894	Newton Abbot UD
Acton LGD	Middlesex	1865	1894	Acton UD
Bredbury and Romiley ("Bredbury" 1865–1880)	Cheshire	1865	1894	Bredbury and Romiley UD
Consett LGD	County Durham	1865	1894	Consett UD
Cramlington LGD	Northumberland	1865	1894	Cramlington UD
Crowle LGD	Lincolnshire and Yorkshire (1865–89), Lincolnshire, Parts of Lindsey (1889–94)	1865	1894	Crowle UD
Frome LGD	Somerset	1865	1894	Frome UD
Guisborough LGD	Yorkshire (1865–89), North Riding of Yorkshire (1889–94)	1865	1894	Guisborough UD
Hornsea LGD	Yorkshire (1865–89), East Riding of Yorkshire (1889–94)	1865	1894	Hornsea UD
Kingsholm St Catherine LGD	Gloucestershire	1865	1874	absorbed by Gloucester MB
Matlock Bath and Scarthin Nick LGD	Derbyshire	1865	1894	Matlock Bath and Scarthin Nick UD
New Shoreham LGD	Sussex (1865–89), West Sussex (1889–94)	1865	1894	New Shoreham UD
Normanby LGD	Yorkshire (1865–89), North Riding of Yorkshire (1889–94)	1865	1894	South Bank in Normanby UD
Ormesby LGD	Yorkshire (1865–89), North Riding of Yorkshire (1889–94)	1865	1894	Ormesby UD
Rugeley LGD	Staffordshire	1865	1894	Rugeley UD
St Columb Major LGD	Cornwall	1865	1878	absorbed by St Columb Major RSD
Walmer LGD	Kent	1865	1894	Walmer UD
Windermere LGD	Westmorland	1865	1894	Windermere UD
Benfieldside LGD	County Durham	1866	1894	Benfieldside UD
Bishop's Stortford LGD	Hertfordshire	1866	1894	Bishop's Stortford UD
Bognor LGD	Sussex (1866–89), West Sussex (1889–94)	1866	1894	Bognor UD
Devonport LGD	Devon	1866	18??	merged with Devonport MB
Farnham LGD	Surrey	1866	1894	Farnham UD
Hayle LGD	Cornwall	1866	1894	Hayle UD
Heath Town (Wednesfield Heath) LGD	Staffordshire	1866	1894	Wednesfield Heath UD
Horncastle LGD	Lincolnshire (1866–89), Lincolnshire, Parts of Lindsey (1889–94)	1866	1894	Horncastle UD
Leadgate LGD	County Durham	1866	1894	Leadgate UD
Lymington LGD	Hampshire	1866	1889	absorbed by Lymington MB
Lynton LGD	Devon	1866	1894	Lynton UD
Newtown and Llanllwchaiarn LGD	Montgomeryshire	1866	1894	Newtown and Llanllwchaiarn UD
Phillack LGD	Cornwall	1866	1894	Phillack UD
Sandown LGD	Hampshire (1866–89), Isle of Wight (1889–94)	1866	1894	Sandown UD
Seaton Carew LGD	County Durham	1866	1883	absorbed by West Hartlepool
Skelton LGD	Yorkshire (1866–89), North Riding of Yorkshire (1889–94)	1866	1894	Skelton and Brotton UD
St Mary Church LGD	Devon	1866	1894	St Mary Church UD
Stowmarket LGD	Suffolk (1866–89), East Suffolk (1889–94)	1866	1894	Stowmarket UD
Sutton in Ashfield LGD	Nottinghamshire	1866	1894	Sutton in Ashfield UD
Ventnor LGD	Hampshire (1866–89), Isle of Wight (1889–94)	1866	1894	Ventnor UD
Walker LGD	Northumberland	1866	1894	Walker UD
Wallsend LGD	Northumberland	1866	1894	Wallsend UD
Wimbledon LGD	Surrey	1866	1894	Wimbledon UD
Bampton LGD	Devon	1867	1894	Bampton UD
Bowness LGD	Westmorland	1867	1894	Bowness-on-Windermere UD
Brierley Hill LGD	Staffordshire	1867	1894	Brierley Hill UD
Bromley LGD	Kent	1867	1894	Bromley UD
East Dean LGD	Gloucestershire	1867	1870	N/A
East Molesey LGD	Surrey	1867	1894	East Molesey UD
Great Malvern LGD	Worcestershire	1867	1894	Great Malvern UD
Hornsey LGD	Middlesex	1867	1894	Hornsey UD
Hinckley LGD	Leicestershire and Warwickshire (1867–89), Leicestershire (1889–94)	1867	1894	Hinckley UD
Hucknall Torkard LGD	Nottinghamshire	1867	1894	Hucknall Torkard UD
Neston and Parkgate LGD	Cheshire	1867	1894	Neston and Parkgate UD
New Malden LGD	Surrey	1867	1894	New Malden UD
Northam LGD	Devon	1867	1894	Northam UD
Portland LGD	Dorset	1867	1894	Portland UD
Quarry Bank LGD	Staffordshire	1867	1894	Quarry Bank UD
Ripley LGD	Derbyshire	1867	1894	Ripley UD
Sale LGD	Cheshire	1867	1894	Sale UD
Sedgley LGD	Staffordshire	1867	1894	Sedgley UD
Teddington LGD	Middlesex	1867	1894	Teddington UD
Warminster LGD	Wiltshire	1867	1894	Warminster UD
Ashbourne LGD	Derbyshire	1868	1894	Ashbourne UD
Chepping Wycombe LGD	Buckinghamshire	1868	1880	split between High Wycombe MB and Wycombe RSD
Felling LGD	County Durham	1868	1894	Felling UD
Filey LGD	Yorkshire (1868–89), East Riding of Yorkshire (1889–94)	1868	1894	Filey UD
Kidsgrove LGD	Staffordshire	1868	1894	Kidsgrove UD
Kirkby Lonsdale LGD	Westmorland	1868	1894	Kirkby Lonsdale UD
Mansfield Woodhouse LGD	Nottinghamshire	1868	1894	Mansfield Woodhouse UD
Midsomer Norton LGD	Somerset	1868	1894	Midsomer Norton UD
Newquay LGD	Cornwall	1868	1894	Newquay UD
Stayley LGD	Cheshire	1868	1881	Stalybridge MB
Twickenham LGD	Middlesex	1868	1894	Twickenham UD
Darlaston LGD	Staffordshire	1869	1894	Darlaston UD
Hadleigh LGD	Suffolk (1869–89), West Suffolk (1889–94)	1869	1894	Hadleigh UD
Middlewich LGD	Cheshire	1869	1894	Middlewich UD
Rowley Regis LGD	Staffordshire	1869	1894	Rowley Regis UD

†Not put into practical operation until 1866.

== 1870-79 ==
When the Public Health Act 1875 (38 & 39 Vict. c. 55) came into force in 1875, all local board districts and local government districts were designated urban sanitary districts, alongside the newly created rural sanitary districts; see list: Rural sanitary districts formed in England and Wales 1875–94.

Local government district	County	Created	Abolished	Successor(s)
Hinderwell LGD	Yorkshire (1870–89), North Riding of Yorkshire (1889–94)	1870	1894	Hinderwell UD
Newbiggin LGD	Northumberland	1870	1894	Newbiggin-by-the-Sea UD
Coleford LGD	Gloucestershire	1871	1894	Coleford UD
Heworth LGD	County Durham	1871	18??	Felling LGD
Horfield LGD†	Gloucestershire	1871	1894	Horfield UD
Sevenoaks LGD	Kent	1871	1894	Sevenoaks UD
Southborough LGD	Kent	1871	1894	Southborough UD
South Cave and Wallingfen ("Wallingfen" 1871–1879)	Yorkshire (1871–89), East Riding of Yorkshire (1889–94)	1871	1894	absorbed by Howden RD and Beverley RD
Swadlincote LGD	Derbyshire	1871	1894	Swadlincote UD
Ashby Woulds LGD	Leicestershire	1872	1894	Ashby Woulds UD
Baldock LGD	Hertfordshire	1872	1894	Baldock UD
Billinge LGD	Lancashire	1872	1894	Billinge UD
East Stonehouse LGD	Devon	1872	1894	East Stonehouse UD
Grasmere LGD	Westmorland	1872	1894	Grasmere UD
Haywards Heath (St Wilfrid's) LGD	Sussex (1872–89), East Sussex (1889–94)	1872	1894	Haywards Heath UD
Malvern Link LGD	Worcestershire	1872	1894	Malvern Link UD
Ramsey LGD	Huntingdonshire	1872	1894	Ramsey UD
Short Heath LGD	Staffordshire	1872	1894	Short Heath UD
South Gosforth LGD	Northumberland	1872	1894	South Gosforth UD
Staines LGD	Middlesex	1872	1894	Staines UD
St Helens LGD	Hampshire (1872–89), Isle of Wight (1889–94)	1872	1894	St Helens UD
Stow on the Wold LGD	Gloucestershire	1872	1894	Stow on the Wold UD
Thame LGD	Oxfordshire	1871	1894	Thame UD
Whitby LGD	Yorkshire (1872–89), North Riding of Yorkshire (1889–94)	1872	1894	Whitby UD
Audley LGD	Staffordshire	1873	1894	Audley UD
Bromborough LGD	Cheshire	1873	1894	Bromborough UD
Buxton LGD	Derbyshire	1873	1894	Buxton UD
Camborne LGD	Cornwall	1873	1894	Camborne UD
Chatham LGD	Kent	1873	1890	Chatham MB
Chatteris LGD	Cambridgeshire (1873–89), Isle of Ely (1889–94)	1873	1894	Chatteris UD
Hebburn LGD	County Durham	1873	1894	Hebburn UD
Hitchin LGD	Hertfordshire	1873	1894	Hitchin UD
Hucknall Huthwaite LGD	Nottinghamshire	1873	1894	Hucknall under Huthwaite UD
Kettering LGD	Northamptonshire	1873	1894	Kettering UD
Mottram in Longdendale LGD	Cheshire	1873	1894	Mottram in Longdendale UD
Newbold-cum-Dunston LGD	Derbyshire	1873	1894	Newbold and Dunston UD
Stevenage LGD	Hertfordshire	1873	1894	Stevenage UD
St George LGD	Gloucestershire	1873	1894	St George UD
Swanage LGD	Dorset	1873	1894	Swanage UD
Wellington LGD	Somerset	1873	1894	Wellington UD
Whitley and Monkseaton LGD	Northumberland	1873	1894	Whitley and Monkseaton UD
Woodford LGD	Essex	1873	1894	Woodford UD
Beeston LGD	Nottinghamshire	1874	1894	Beeston UD
Brentford LGD	Middlesex	1874	1894	Brentford UD
Cleethorpe LGD	Lincolnshire (1874–89), Lincolnshire, Parts of Lindsey (1889–94)	1874	1894	Cleethorpes with Thrunscoe UD
East Barnet Valley LGD	Hertfordshire and Middlesex (1874–89), Hertfordshire (1889–94)	1874	1894	East Barnet Valley UD
Great Driffield LGD	Yorkshire (1874–89), East Riding of Yorkshire (1889–94)	1874	1894	Great Driffield UD
Handsworth LGD	Staffordshire	1874	1894	Handsworth UD
Northfleet LGD	Kent	1874	1894	Northfleet UD
Radstock LGD	Somerset	1874	1894	Radstock UD
Stanhope LGD	County Durham	1874	1894	Stanhope UD
Willesden LGD	Middlesex	1874	1894	Willesden UD
Bicester LGD	Oxfordshire	1875	1894	Bicester UD
Brampton and Walton LGD	Derbyshire	1875	1894	Brampton and Walton UD
Charlton Kings LGD††	Gloucestershire	1875	1894	Charlton Kings UD
Clay Lane LGD	Derbyshire	1875	1894	Clay Cross UD
Heston and Isleworth LGD	Middlesex	1875	1894	Heston and Isleworth UD
Horsham LGD	Sussex (1875–89), West Sussex (1889–94)	1875	1894	Horsham UD
Long Eaton LGD	Derbyshire	1875	1894	Long Eaton UD
Marple LGD	Cheshire	1875	1894	Marple UD
Millom LGD	Cumberland	1875	1894	Millom UD
New Mills LGD	Derbyshire and Cheshire (1875–89), Derbyshire (1889–94)	1875	1894	New Mills UD
North Walsham LGD	Norfolk	1875	1894	North Walsham UD
Whickham LGD	County Durham	1875	1894	Whickham UD
Wigton LGD	Cumberland	1875	1894	Wigton UD
Winsford LGD	Cheshire	1875	1894	Winsford UD
Cirencester LGD	Gloucestershire	1876	1894	Cirencester UD
Dawley Magna LGD	Shropshire	1876	1894	Dawley UD
Erith LGD	Kent	1876	1894	Erith UD
Lofthouse LGD	Yorkshire (1876–89), North Riding of Yorkshire (1889–94)	1876	1894	Loftus UD
Shepton Mallet LGD	Somerset	1876	1894	Shepton Mallet UD
St Neots LGD	Huntingdonshire	1876	1894	St Neots UD
Belper LGD	Derbyshire	1877	1894	Belper UD
Brandon and Byshottles LGD	County Durham	1877	1894	Brandon and Byshottles UD
Brown Hills LGD	Staffordshire	1877	1894	Brownhills UD
Cannock LGD	Staffordshire	1877	1894	Cannock UD
East Dereham LGD	Norfolk	1877	1894	East Dereham UD
Kenilworth LGD	Warwickshire	1877	1894	Kenilworth UD
Kirkleatham LGD	Yorkshire (1877–89), North Riding of Yorkshire (1889–94)	1877	1894	Kirkleatham UD
Shildon and Thickley LGD	County Durham	1877	1894	Shildon UD
Tetbury LGD	Gloucestershire	1877	1894	Tetbury UD
Wirksworth LGD	Derbyshire	1877	1894	Wirksworth UD
Beckenham LGD	Kent	1878	1894	Beckenham UD
Benwell and Fenham LGD	Northumberland	1878	1894	Benwell and Fenham UD
Budleigh Salterton LGD	Devon	1878	1894	Budleigh Salterton UD
East Ham LGD	Essex	1878	1894	East Ham UD
Finchley LGD	Middlesex	1878	1894	Finchley UD
Haverhill LGD	Suffolk and Essex (1878–89), West Suffolk (1889–94)	1878	1894	Haverhill UD
Market Rasen LGD	Lincolnshire (1878–89), Lincolnshire, Parts of Lindsey (1889–94)	1878	1894	Market Rasen UD
Melksham LGD	Wiltshire	1878	1894	Melksham UD
Seaton and Beer LGD	Devon	1878	1894	Seaton UD
Stone LGD	Staffordshire	1878	1894	Stone UD
Wilmslow LGD	Cheshire	1878	1894	Wilmslow UD
Amble LGD	Northumberland	1879	1894	Amble UD
Broadstairs and St Peter's LGD	Kent	1879	1894	Broadstairs and St Peter's UD
Burgess Hill LGD	Sussex (1879–89), East Sussex (1889–94)	1879	1894	Burgess Hill UD
Egremont LGD	Cumberland	1879	1894	Egremont UD
Hendon LGD	Middlesex	1879	1894	Hendon UD
Market Harborough LGD	Leicestershire	1879	1894	Market Harborough UD
Saltburn by the Sea LGD	Yorkshire (1879–89), North Riding of Yorkshire (1889–94)	1879	1894	Saltburn by the Sea UD
Stapleton LGD	Gloucestershire	1879	1894	Stapleton UD

†Had adopted the Act in 1866. ††Had adopted the Act in 1861.

== 1880-89 ==
Local Government District	County	Created	Abolished	Successor(s)
Bexley LGD	Kent	1880	1894	Bexley UD
Chesterton LGD	Cambridgeshire	1880	1894	Chesterton UD
Salcombe LGD	Devon	1880	1894	Salcombe UD
Carlton LGD	Nottinghamshire	1881	1894	Carlton UD
Compton Gifford LGD	Devon	1881	1894	Compton Gifford UD
Dorking LGD	Surrey	1881	1894	Dorking UD
Newhaven LGD	Sussex (1881–89), East Sussex (1889–94)	1881	1894	Newhaven UD
Southgate LGD	Middlesex	1881	1894	Southgate UD
Willington LGD	County Durham	1881	1894	Willington UD
Arlecdon and Frizington LGD	Cumberland	1882	1894	Arlecdon and Frizington UD
Barking Town LGD	Essex	1882	1894	Barking Town UD
Biddulph LGD	Staffordshire	1882	1894	Biddulph UD
Sutton LGD	Surrey	1882	1894	Sutton UD
Carshalton LGD	Surrey	1883	1894	Carshalton UD
Friern Barnet LGD	Middlesex	1883	1894	Friern Barnet UD
Seaford LGD	Sussex (1883–89), East Sussex (1889–94)	1883	1894	Seaford UD
Tettenhall LGD	Staffordshire	1883	1894	Tettenhall UD
Bexhill LGD	Sussex (1884–89), East Sussex (1889–94)	1884	1894	Bexhill UD
Chesham LGD	Buckinghamshire	1884	1894	Chesham UD
East Grinstead LGD	Sussex (1884–89), East Sussex (1889–94)	1884	1894	East Grinstead UD
Eston LGD	Yorkshire (1884–89), North Riding of Yorkshire (1889–94)	1884	1894	Eston UD
Ambleside LGD	Westmorland	1885	1894	Ambleside UD
Cromer LGD	Norfolk	1885	1894	Cromer UD
Hanwell LGD	Middlesex	1885	1894	Hanwell UD
Skegness LGD	Lincolnshire (1885–89), Lincolnshire, Parts of Lindsey (1889–94)	1885	1894	Skegness UD
Cheadle and Gatley LGD	Cheshire	1886	1894	Cheadle and Gatley UD
Grays Thurrock LGD	Essex	1886	1894	Grays Thurrock UD
Felixstowe and Walton LGD	Suffolk (1887–89), East Suffolk (1889–94)	1887	1894	Felixstowe UD
Shepshed LGD	Leicestershire	1887	1894	Shepshed UD
Wood Green LGD	Middlesex	1888	1894	Wood Green UD

== 1890-94 ==
Local government district	County	Created	Abolished	Successor(s)
Hampton LGD	Middlesex	1890	1894	Hampton UD
Ilford LGD	Essex	1890	1894	Ilford UD
Kingswood LGD	Gloucestershire	1890	1894	Kingswood UD
Scunthorpe LGD	Lincolnshire, Parts of Lindsey	1890	1894	Scunthorpe UD
Bedwellty LGD	Monmouthshire	1891	1894	Bedwellty UD
Caversham LGD	Oxfordshire	1891	1894	Caversham UD
Desborough LGD	Northamptonshire	1891	1894	Desborough UD
Great Clacton LGD	Essex	1891	1894	Clacton UD
Harrington LGD	Cumberland	1891	1894	Harrington UD
Leighton Buzzard LGD	Bedfordshire	1891	1894	Leighton Buzzard UD
Minehead LGD	Somerset	1891	1894	Minehead UD
Norwood LGD	Middlesex	1891	1894	Southall Norwood UD
Paul LGD	Cornwall	1891	1894	Paul UD
Rothwell LGD	Northamptonshire	1891	1894	Rothwell UD
Rushden LGD	Northamptonshire	1891	1894	Rushden UD
West Bridgford LGD	Nottinghamshire	1891	1894	West Bridgford UD
West Kirby and Hoylake LGD	Cheshire	1891	1894	West Kirby and Hoylake UD
Aspatria LGD	Cumberland	1892	1894	Aspatria UD
Biggleswade LGD	Bedfordshire	1892	1894	Biggleswade UD
Branksome LGD	Dorset	1892	1894	Branksome UD
Coalville LGD	Leicestershire	1892	1894	Coalville UD
Hunstanton LGD	Norfolk	1892	1894	Hunstanton UD
Portishead LGD	Somerset	1892	1894	Portishead UD
Stanley LGD	County Durham	1892	1894	Stanley UD
Wimborne LGD	Dorset	1892	1894	Wimborne Minster UD
Ampthill LGD	Bedfordshire	1893	1895	Ampthill UD
Barnes LGD	Surrey	1893	1894	Barnes UD
Bolsover LGD	Derbyshire	1893	1894	Bolsover UD
Caerphilly LGD	Glamorgan	1893	1894	Caerphilly UD
Eastleigh LGD	Hampshire	1893	1894	Eastleigh UD
Kingsbridge and Dodbrooke LGD (1893), Kingsbridge LGD (1893–94)	Devon	1893	1894	Kingsbridge UD
Newburn LGD	Northumberland	1893	1894	Newburn UD
Nuneaton and Chilvers Cotton LGD	Warwickshire	1893	1894	Nuneaton and Chilvers Cotton UD
Petersfield LGD	Hampshire	1893	1894	Petersfield UD
Pockington LGD	East Riding of Yorkshire	1893	1894	Pockington UD
Woking LGD	Surrey	1893	1894	Woking UD
