= Ripley Urban District =

Former urban district in Derbyshire, England (1894-1974)

Coordinates: 53.367°N 2.007°W

Ripley
- Area
  - 1911: 2,815 acres (11.39 km^{2})
  - 1961: 5,415 acres (21.91 km^{2})
- Population
  - 1911: 11,848
  - 1961: 17,617
- History
  - Created: 1894
  - Abolished: 1974
  - Succeeded by: Amber Valley
- Status: Urban District
- Government: Ripley Urban District Council
  - HQ: Ripley

Ripley was an urban district in Derbyshire, England, from 1894 to 1974. It was created under the Local Government Act 1894.

The district was abolished in 1974 under the Local Government Act 1972 and combined with the Alfreton, Belper and Heanor Urban Districts and the Belper Rural District to form the new Amber Valley district.
