= 2023 Amber Valley Borough Council election =

2023 English local election

2023 Amber Valley Borough Council Election
- 4 May 2023

All 42 seats for Amber Valley Borough Council 22 seats needed for a majority

	First party	Second party	Third party
Leader	Chris Emmas-Williams	Kevin Buttery	Dave Wells
Party	Labour	Conservative	Green
Last election	11 seats,	30 seats	3 seats
Seats before	9	25	3
Seats won	26	7	6
Seat change	▲15	▼21	▲3
Popular vote	27,253	24,644	11,762
Percentage	34.7%	31.3%	15.0%
	Fourth party	Fifth party	Sixth party
Leader	Ben Bellamy	Kate Smith	Alexander Stevenson
Party	Independent	Liberal Democrats	Reform
Last election	0 seats	0 seats	New party
Seats before	3	0	5
Seats won	2	1	0
Seat change	▲2	▲1	Steady
Popular vote	3,712	3,833	7,312
Percentage	4.7%	4.9%	9.3%
- Winner of each seat at the 2023 Amber Valley Borough Council election
Leader before election
Kevin Buttery
Conservative
Leader after election
Chris Emmas-Williams
Labour

The 2023 Amber Valley Borough Council election took place on 4 May 2023 to elect all 42 councillors for Amber Valley Borough Council. This was on the same day as other local elections in England.

Following the boundary review by the Local Government Boundary Commission, this was the first election under the new boundaries. In addition to the new ward boundaries the council was no longer elected by thirds, with the whole council elected once every 4 years. Along with Derby City Council, who also changed to whole council elections in 2023, Amber Valley was the last authority in Derbyshire to switch to whole council elections. The last election where all members were elected was at the 2000 election.

Under the boundary review, the number of councillors elected was reduced from 45 to 42. Prior to the election the council was led by Conservative councillor Kevin Buttery, who had been leader since May 2021. He chose not to stand for re-election.

Labour won a majority at the election, winning several seats from the Conservatives. The Labour leader, Chris Emmas-Williams, was appointed leader of the council at the subsequent annual council meeting on 24 May 2023.

== Summary ==
=== Election result ===
2023 Amber Valley Borough Council election
Party	Candidates	Seats	Gains	Losses	Net gain/loss	Seats %	Votes %	Votes	+/−
Labour	42	26	18	3	▲15	61.9	34.7	27,253	–1.7
Conservative	42	7	0	21	▼21	16.7	31.3	24,644	–11.3
Green	28	6	3	0	▲3	14.3	15.0	11,762	–1.3
Independent	7	2	2	0	▲2	4.8	4.7	3,712	N/A
Liberal Democrats	25	1	1	0	▲1	2.4	4.9	3,833	+0.4
Reform	28	0	0	0	Steady	0.0	9.3	7,312	N/A
SDP	1	0	0	0	Steady	0.0	0.1	69	+0.1
National Front	1	0	0	0	Steady	0.0	0.1	40	+0.1

== Council composition ==
After the 2022 election, the composition of the council was:

↓
30	11	3	1
Conservative	Labour	Green	Ind

Prior to the 2023 election, through a number of suspensions and defections, the composition of the council was:

↓
25	9	5	3	3
Conservative	Labour	Reform UK	Green	Ind

After the 2023 election, the composition of the council was:

↓
26	7	6	2	1
Labour	Conservative	Green	Ind	Lib Dem

== Ward results ==
=== Alfreton ===
Alfreton
Party	Candidate	Votes	%	±%
Labour	Steve Marshall-Clarke	828	50.6	
Labour	Gail Dolman	809	49.4	
Labour	Keith Michael Wood	763	46.6	
Conservative	Colin Boyce	443	27.1	
Conservative	Brian David Cantrill	403	24.6	
Conservative	Frances Mary Cantrill	402	24.6	
Green	Russ Hubber	157	9.6	
Reform	Billy Bowles	143	8.7	
Reform	Helen Rachael Gent	131	8.0	
Reform	Paul Price	123	7.5	
Liberal Democrats	Jeremy Quentin Miles	104	6.4	
Liberal Democrats	Paul Robin Gibbons	100	6.1	
Liberal Democrats	Judith Marguerite Nilsen	92	5.6	
Turnout		1,645	25	
Labour hold		Swing		
Labour gain from Conservative		Swing		
Labour hold		Swing		

=== Alport & South West Parishes ===
Previously two single member wards of Alport and South West Parishes

Alport & South West Parishes
Party	Candidate	Votes	%	±%
Conservative	David Harry Taylor	868	45.4	
Conservative	Jane Orton	846	44.3	
Green	Godfrey Meynell	496	26.0	
Labour	Diana Hancock	455	23.8	
Labour	Mary Patricia Dwyer	450	23.5	
Liberal Democrats	Michael John Heap	165	8.6	
Liberal Democrats	Peter Roy Stanton	143	7.5	
Reform	Freddie Theobald	100	5.2	
Turnout		1,914	42	
Conservative hold		Swing		
Conservative hold		Swing		

=== Belper East ===
Belper East
Party	Candidate	Votes	%	±%
Labour	Tracey Hill	978	30.6	
Labour	John Christopher Porter	928	29.1	
Belper Independents	Fay Atkinson (Note: Stood under the description Belper Independents)	890	27.9	
Conservative	John Nelson	867	27.1	
Belper Independents	Ruth Frances Bellamy	852	26.7	
Labour	Sally Mary Orman-Chan	816	25.5	
Conservative	Michael Greatbatch	787	24.6	
Belper Independents	Jonni Bishop (Note: Stood under the description Belper Independents)	729	22.8	
Conservative	John Crawley	673	21.1	
Green	Sue Devine	469	14.7	
Green	Julie Christine Wozniczka	372	11.6	
Green	Mark Andrew Simmons	329	10.3	
Liberal Democrats	John Morrissey	234	7.3	
Liberal Democrats	Richard Alan Salmon	124	3.9	
Liberal Democrats	Ian Martin Scrase	73	2.3	
Turnout		3,225	40	
Labour hold		Swing		
Belper Independents hold		Swing		
Labour win (new seat)				

=== Belper North ===
Belper North
Party	Candidate	Votes	%	±%
Labour Co-op	Emma Louise Monkman	783	36.5	
Belper Independents	Ben Rupert Edward Bellamy (Note: Stood under the description Belper Independents)	663	30.9	
Labour Co-op	James Butler	600	28.0	
Conservative	Gary John Spendlove	570	26.6	
Conservative	James Daniel Kerry	481	22.4	
Belper Independents	Jyoti Michael Wilkinson (Note: Stood under the description Belper Independents)	378	17.6	
Green	Jane Ellen Margaret Harlow	340	15.9	
Green	Rachael Sarah Willshaw	318	14.8	
Turnout		2,155	45	
Labour Co-op hold		Swing		
Belper Independents hold		Swing		

=== Belper South ===
Belper South
Party	Candidate	Votes	%	±%
Green	Gez Kinsella	826	47.8	
Green	Jamie Alexander Walls	790	45.7	
Conservative	Ben Miller	268	15.5	
Conservative	David Smith	218	12.6	
Labour Co-op	Lyndy Urquhart	207	12.0	
Labour Co-op	Patrick William Mountain	191	11.0	
Belper Independents	Luke Dale Clayton Ploughman (Note: Stood under the description Belper Independents)	121	7.0	
Belper Independents	Neil Ploughman (Note: Stood under the description Belper Independents)	79	4.6	
Reform	Laura Jane Brunelleschi	46	2.7	
Turnout		1,737	40	
Green hold		Swing		
Green gain from Labour		Swing		

=== Codnor, Langley Mill & Aldercar ===
Codnor, Langley Mill & Aldercar
Party	Candidate	Votes	%	±%
Labour	Chris Emmas-Williams	871	42.5	
Labour	Eileen Hamilton	702	34.3	
Labour	David Edward Moon	684	33.4	
Conservative	David John Cattermole	552	27.0	
Reform	Sam Goodrum	470	22.9	
Conservative	Sally Margaret Cresswell	430	21.0	
Reform	Sheena Edith Trower	427	20.8	
Reform	Alan George Abernethy	404	19.7	
Conservative	Amy Donohue	401	19.6	
Green	Vicky Anne Marie Powers	250	12.2	
National Front	Timothy Knowles	40	2.0	
Turnout		2,052	28	
Labour gain from Reform		Swing		
Labour gain from Reform		Swing		
Labour win (new seat)				

=== Crich & South Wingfield ===
Previously two single member wards of Crich and Wingfield

Crich & South Wingfield
Party	Candidate	Votes	%	±%
Conservative	Dawn Margaret Harper	710	38.3	
Liberal Democrats	Kate Smith	690	37.3	
Conservative	Tony Harper	668	36.1	
Liberal Democrats	Marcus Walter Johnson	570	30.8	
Labour	Tim Benson	257	13.9	
Green	Fiona Horton	238	12.9	
Labour	John Cowings	216	11.7	
Green	Sally Elizabeth Lowick	174	9.4	
Reform	Edward Hudson Oakenfull	89	4.8	
Turnout		1,856	44	
Conservative hold		Swing		
Liberal Democrats gain from Conservative		Swing		

=== Duffield & Quarndon ===
Duffield & Quarndon
Party	Candidate	Votes	%	±%
Green	Alison McDermott	1,685	67.9	
Green	Eva Long	1,580	63.7	
Conservative	Steven Knee	684	27.6	
Conservative	Martin Bettridge	663	26.7	
Labour	Mark Spilsbury	168	6.8	
Labour	Maurice Neville	91	3.7	
Turnout		2,484	52	
Green hold		Swing		
Green hold		Swing		

=== Heage & Ambergate ===
Heage & Ambergate
Party	Candidate	Votes	%	±%
Labour	Paul Edwin Lobley	746	49.0	
Labour	Amina Sabeah Deens Burslem	547	36.0	
Conservative	Angela Susan Ward	524	34.5	
Conservative	Valerie Joan Taylor	391	25.7	
Green	David Martin Hatchett	228	15.0	
Green	Clare Elizabeth Hartwell	222	14.6	
Reform	Karl Martin Chatburn	139	9.1	
Turnout		1,536	38	
Labour hold		Swing		
Labour gain from Conservative		Swing		

=== Heanor East ===
Heanor East
Party	Candidate	Votes	%	±%
Labour	Trevor Holmes	524	32.0	
Labour	Janet Irene Ward	524	32.0	
Reform	Joanne Gent	505	30.8	
Reform	Mark Anthony Burrell	496	30.3	
Conservative	Linda Edwards-Milson	393	24.0	
Conservative	Jake William Gilbert	381	23.3	
Green	Cathie Hallsworth	219	13.4	
Turnout		1,653	31	
Labour gain from Conservative		Swing		
Labour gain from Reform		Swing		

=== Heanor West & Loscoe ===
Heanor West & Loscoe
Party	Candidate	Votes	%	±%
Labour	Steven Bower	873	36.4	
Labour	Nicholas Arron Beswick	858	35.8	
Labour	Matthew Gareth Jones	786	32.8	
Conservative	Steven Grainger	642	26.8	
Reform	Jackie Stones	640	26.7	
Reform	Rob Booth	605	25.2	
Conservative	Nikki Savage	580	24.2	
Reform	Billy Weston	555	23.1	
Conservative	Dale Christopher Wright	513	21.4	
Green	James Major John Brooks	251	10.5	
Liberal Democrats	Sybille Elisabeth Stephenson	126	5.3	
Liberal Democrats	Jerry Marler	117	4.9	
Liberal Democrats	Barry Ian Holliday	111	4.6	
Turnout		2,426	30	
Labour gain from Conservative		Swing		
Labour gain from Conservative		Swing		
Labour win (new seat)				

=== Ironville and Riddings ===
Ironville and Riddings
Party	Candidate	Votes	%	±%
Labour	Kieron Cox	645	44.4	
Labour	Rebecca Louise Grundy	645	44.4	
Conservative	Peter Maurice Clark	444	30.6	
Conservative	Sarah Jane Turner	372	25.6	
Reform	Phil Rose	235	16.2	
Reform	Matt Gent	214	14.7	
Green	Rachael Mary Hatchett	108	7.4	
Liberal Democrats	Joanna Elizabeth Karpasea	50	3.4	
Liberal Democrats	Kate Mary Kift	28	1.9	
Turnout		1,455	31	
Labour gain from Conservative		Swing		
Labour gain from Conservative		Swing		

=== Kilburn, Denby, Holbrook & Horsley ===
Kilburn, Denby, Holbrook & Horsley
Party	Candidate	Votes	%	±%
Labour Co-op	Linsey Farnsworth	1,158	41.8	
Conservative	Trevor Mark Ainsworth	1,065	38.4	
Conservative	Julie Whitmore	981	35.4	
Conservative	Matt Murray	930	33.6	
Labour Co-op	Michael John Missett	885	31.9	
Labour Co-op	Dean Watson	856	30.9	
Green	Matt McGuinness	376	13.6	
Green	Kathy Gorman	373	13.5	
Reform	Matt Waterfall	331	11.9	
Reform	Adrian William Nathan	250	9.0	
Liberal Democrats	Gareth Joseph Alwyne Cresswell	189	6.8	
Liberal Democrats	Sarah Denise Gent	171	6.2	
Liberal Democrats	Chris Gent	150	5.4	
Turnout		2,775	40	
Labour gain from Conservative		Swing		
Conservative hold		Swing		
Conservative hold		Swing		

=== Ripley ===
Ripley
Party	Candidate	Votes	%	±%
Labour Co-op	Tony Holmes	1,192	48.4	
Labour Co-op	David Alan Williams	1,062	43.1	
Labour Co-op	Matthew Robert Allwood	1,022	41.5	
Conservative	Sean David Carter	902	36.6	
Conservative	Paul Colin Moss	830	33.7	
Conservative	Lorna Dorothy Tassi	798	32.4	
Green	Hillie Fender	188	7.6	
Green	Kendal Tanya Greaves	175	7.1	
Reform	Becki Booth	169	6.9	
Reform	Sean Hind	145	5.9	
Liberal Democrats	Paul Arthur Gillians	105	4.3	
Liberal Democrats	Jacob Gent	69	2.8	
SDP	Edwin George Dale Taylor	69	2.8	
Liberal Democrats	Paul Andrew Smith	60	2.4	
Turnout		2,473	33	
Labour gain from Conservative		Swing		
Labour gain from Conservative		Swing		
Labour gain from Conservative		Swing		

=== Ripley & Marehay ===
Ripley & Marehay
Party	Candidate	Votes	%	±%
Labour Co-op	Lyndsay Delyth Cox	694	41.8	
Labour Co-op	Mick Wilson	684	41.2	
Conservative	Ron Ashton	665	40.0	
Conservative	Trevor Spencer	460	27.7	
Green	Michael Peter Bedford	176	10.6	
Reform	Marie Cresswell	162	9.7	
Reform	Tracy Rochelle Smith	141	8.5	
Turnout		1,666	34	
Labour gain from Conservative		Swing		
Labour gain from Conservative		Swing		

=== Smalley, Shipley & Horsley Woodhouse ===
Smalley, Shipley & Horsley Woodhouse
Party	Candidate	Votes	%	±%
Green	Amanda Louise Paget	748	40.4	
Green	Lian Pizzey	672	36.3	
Conservative	Richard Henry Iliffe	592	32.0	
Conservative	Christopher Darko Perko	455	24.6	
Labour Co-op	Christine Elizabeth Jordan	270	14.6	
Reform	Alex Stevenson	268	14.5	
Reform	Vikki Harvey	240	13.0	
Labour Co-op	Keith Lisle Venables	228	12.3	
Liberal Democrats	Adrian James Miller	67	3.6	
Turnout		1,856	41	
Green gain from Conservative		Swing		
Green gain from Reform		Swing		

=== Somercotes ===
Somercotes
Party	Candidate	Votes	%	±%
Labour	John McCabe	653	62.8	
Labour	Elaine Stephanie Sherman	519	49.9	
Conservative	Jennifer Lynne Ainsworth	207	19.9	
Conservative	Jill Hayes	193	18.6	
Reform	Simon Gent	92	8.8	
Reform	Caroline Susan Gent	88	8.5	
Liberal Democrats	Tracey Anne Pearson	65	6.3	
Liberal Democrats	Paul Slater	61	5.9	
Green	Richard Sewell	55	5.3	
Turnout		1,040	23	
Labour hold		Swing		
Labour hold		Swing		

=== Swanwick ===
Swanwick
Party	Candidate	Votes	%	±%
Conservative	Steve Hayes	733	44.1	
Conservative	Jonty Powis	659	39.7	
Labour	Gareth Trewick	597	35.9	
Labour	Axl Nicholls	488	29.4	
Green	Steve Elliott	265	16.0	
Liberal Democrats	Malvin Leslie Trigg	170	10.2	
Reform	Malc Hibbard	150	9.0	
Turnout		1,661	39	
Conservative hold		Swing		
Conservative hold		Swing		

== By-elections ==
=== Crich & South Wingfield ===
Crich & South Wingfield by-election, 2 May 2024
Party	Candidate	Votes	%	±%
Conservative	Tony Harper	617	35.9	−2.4
Liberal Democrats	Marcus Johnson	434	25.2	−12.1
Labour	Amy Trewick	428	24.9	+11.0
Green	Fiona Horton	240	14.0	+1.1
Majority		183	10.7	
Rejected ballots		16		
Turnout		1735	41.1	
Conservative hold		Swing		

The Crich & South Wingfield by-election was triggered by the resignation of councillor Dawn Harper.

=== Kilburn, Denby, Holbrook & Horsley ===
Kilburn, Denby, Holbrook & Horsley by-election, 1 May 2025
Party	Candidate	Votes	%	±%
Conservative	Matt Murray	854	32.1	−2.0
Green	Nicola Perry	676	25.4	+13.3
Labour	John Cowings	585	22.0	−15.1
Independent	Alex Stevenson	375	14.1	New
Liberal Democrats	Sarah Denise Gent	169	6.4	+0.3
Majority		178	6.7	
Rejected ballots		31		
Turnout		2690	39.9	
Conservative gain from Labour		Swing		

The Kilburn, Denby, Holbrook & Horsley by-election was triggered by the resignation of Labour councillor Linsey Farnsworth, who was by then the Member of Parliament for Amber Valley.

=== Ironville & Riddings ===
Ironville & Riddings by-election, 1 May 2025
Party	Candidate	Votes	%	±%
Independent	Philip Rose	463	31.0	New
Conservative	Sarah Jane Tucker	442	29.6	−0.4
Labour	James Earl Whitmore	340	22.8	−20.7
Green	Dave Hatchett	147	9.9	+1.6
Liberal Democrats	Paul Slater	100	6.7	+3.3
Majority		21	1.4	
Rejected ballots		39		
Turnout		1532	33.6	
Independent gain from Labour		Swing		

The Ironville & Riddings by-election was triggered by the resignation of Labour councillor Rebecca Grundy.

=== Somercotes ===
Somercotes by-election, 5 June 2025
Party	Candidate	Votes	%	±%
Reform	James Kerry	396	45.3	+36.7
Labour	Sian Harper	346	39.6	−21.3
Conservative	Jake Gilbert	53	6.1	−13.2
Liberal Democrats	Paul Slater	48	5.5	−0.6
Green	Russ Hubber	20	2.3	−2.8
Independent	Alex Stevenson	11	1.3	New
Majority		50	5.7	
Rejected ballots		1		
Turnout		875	19.4	
Reform gain from Labour		Swing		

The Somercotes by-election was triggered by the death of councillor John McCabe, who had represented the ward since 1986.

=== Codnor, Langley Mill & Aldercar ===
Codnor, Langley Mill & Aldercar by-election, 20 January 2026
Party	Candidate	Votes	%	±%
Reform	Dave Chambers	595	45.6	+24.1
Labour	Mark Howard	249	19.1	−20.8
Advance UK	Alex Stevenson	161	12.3	New
Conservative	Jake Gilbert	130	10.0	−15.3
Green	Bess Saunders	77	5.9	−5.5
Derbyshire Community Party	Rob Marshall	50	3.8	New
Liberal Democrats	Gemma Davey	42	3.2	New
Majority		346	26.5	
Turnout		1304	18.3	
Reform gain from Labour		Swing		

The Codnor, Langley Mill & Aldercar by-election was triggered by the resignation of councillor David Moon.

=== Kilburn, Denby, Holbrook & Horsley ===
Kilburn, Denby, Holbrook & Horsley by-election, 8 October 2026
Party	Candidate	Votes	%	±%
Green	Bess Saunders	674	29.5	+4.1
Reform	Juliette Stevens	617	27.0	New
Conservative	Paul Moss	386	16.9	−15.2
Labour	Andrew Bayton	364	15.9	−6.1
Restore	Edward Oakenfull	246	10.8	New
Majority		57	2.5	
Turnout			34.3	
Green gain from Conservative		Swing		

The Kilburn, Denby, Holbrook & Horsley by-election was triggered by the resignation of Conservative councillor Julie Whitmore.

=== Alport & South West Parishes ===
Alport & South West Parishes by-election: 17 December 2026
Party	Candidate	Votes	%	±%
Conservative	David Coates			
Green	Rachael Hatchett			
Majority				
Turnout				
		Swing		

== Changes of allegiance ==
- Amanda Paget, elected for the Green Party, moved to Conservative in March 2024, then moved again to Reform UK in April 2026.
- Steven Bower, elected for Labour, left the party to sit as an independent - announced May 2025.
- Trevor Holmes, elected for Labour, left the party to sit as an independent - announced December 2025. Labour lost its majority on the council at this point.
- Emma Monkman, elected for Labour, left the party to sit as an independent in May 2026.
