= 2000 Amber Valley Borough Council election =

2000 UK local government election

Map of the results of the 2000 Amber Valley council election. Conservatives in blue, Labour in red and Independent in grey.

The 2000 Amber Valley Borough Council election took place on 4 May 2000 to elect members of Amber Valley Borough Council in Derbyshire, England. The whole council was up for election with boundary changes since the last election in 1999 increasing the number of seats by 2. The Conservative Party gained control of the council from the Labour Party.

== Election result ==
Overall turnout in the election was 31.6%, with a trial in 2 wards seeing a 115% increase in postal voting after anyone was allowed to apply.

Amber Valley local election result 2000
Party	Seats	Gains	Losses	Net gain/loss	Seats %	Votes %	Votes	+/−
Conservative	32			+21	71.1	50.7	27,044	
Labour	12			-20	26.7	42.4	22,604	
Independent	1			+1	2.2	2.0	1,041	
Liberal Democrats	0			0	0	4.9	2,604	

== Ward results ==
Alfreton (3)
Party	Candidate	Votes	%	±%
Labour	Kathryn Salt	692		
Labour	Gillian Dolman	676		
Independent	Colin Thornton	657		
Labour	Steven Daley	546		
Conservative	Jill Ratcliffe	359		
Conservative	Simon Hitchcock	346		
Liberal Democrats	Paul Gibbons	297		
Turnout		3,573	22.0	

Alport
Party	Candidate	Votes	%	±%
Conservative	Mary Fletcher	553	67.4	
Labour	Keith Wharam	137	16.7	
Liberal Democrats	Peter Handscombe	131	16.0	
Majority		416	50.7	
Turnout		821	39.4	

Belper Central (2)
Party	Candidate	Votes	%	±%
Conservative	John Nelson	805		
Conservative	Robert Hailsworth	722		
Labour	Joyce Sanders	502		
Labour	Alan Broughton	495		
Liberal Democrats	Fiona Read	88		
Liberal Democrats	Colin Thompson	73		
Turnout		2,685	35.5	

Belper East (2)
Party	Candidate	Votes	%	±%
Conservative	Michael Handley	546		
Conservative	Martin Thomlinson	530		
Labour	Nalda Boyes-Jackson	441		
Labour	Ashley Welch	421		
Turnout		1,938	22.6	

Belper North (2)
Party	Candidate	Votes	%	±%
Conservative	Alan Cox	882		
Conservative	Benjamin Miller	847		
Labour	Robert Janes	398		
Labour	Kenneth Armstrong	299		
Turnout		2,426	33.5	

Belper South (2)
Party	Candidate	Votes	%	±%
Conservative	Peter Arnold	673		
Conservative	Chris Short	638		
Labour	Ronald Buzzard	514		
Labour	Peter Sheperd	502		
Turnout		2,327	31.0	

Codnor & Waingroves (2)
Party	Candidate	Votes	%	±%
Labour	Christopher Emmas-Williams	558		
Conservative	David Cattermole	529		
Conservative	Michael Mumby	483		
Labour	Ian Fisher	480		
Turnout		2,050	27.7	

Crich
Party	Candidate	Votes	%	±%
Conservative	Glyn Hartshorne	459	51.3	
Labour	Philip Whitney	306	34.2	
Liberal Democrats	Roger Shelley	130	14.5	
Majority		153	17.1	
Turnout		895	47.0	

Duffield (2)
Party	Candidate	Votes	%	±%
Conservative	Anthony Woodings	897		
Conservative	Murray Charmichael-Smith	858		
Labour	Diana Hancock	341		
Labour	Jean Minion	293		
Liberal Democrats	Deena Gillat	275		
Liberal Democrats	Jeremy Benson	191		
Turnout		2,855	39.0	

Heage & Ambergate (2)
Party	Candidate	Votes	%	±%
Conservative	Albert Wilde	711		
Conservative	June Emmott	709		
Labour	Maurice Gent	699		
Labour	Michael Missett	475		
Liberal Democrats	Anthony Cooper	183		
Turnout		2,777	38.3	

Heanor & Loscoe (2)
Party	Candidate	Votes	%	±%
Labour	Peter Bailey	514		
Labour	John Moon	484		
Conservative	Christine Storr	423		
Conservative	Sally West	387		
Turnout		1,808	23.7	

Heanor East (2)
Party	Candidate	Votes	%	±%
Conservative	Francis Bulkeley-Kirkham	459		
Labour	Glynne Cato	451		
Labour	Harry Soar	438		
Conservative	Enid Trusswell	431		
Turnout		1,779	23.7	

Heanor West (2)
Party	Candidate	Votes	%	±%
Labour	Celia Cox	477		
Labour	Paul Jones	451		
Conservative	Janet MacDonald	384		
Conservative	Linda Edwards-Milsom	379		
Liberal Democrats	Andrew Healy	323		
Liberal Democrats	Judith Woolley	323		
Turnout		2,337	28.1	

Ironville & Riddings (2)
Party	Candidate	Votes	%	±%
Conservative	Jack Brown	788		
Conservative	George Cope	614		
Labour	David Griffiths	552		
Labour	Pamela Cope	535		
Liberal Democrats	Keith Falconbridge	101		
Turnout		2,590	32.7	

Kilburn, Denby & Holbrook (3)
Party	Candidate	Votes	%	±%
Conservative	Charles Bull	870		
Conservative	Albert Hall	846		
Conservative	Alan Warner	788		
Labour	Richard Massey	749		
Labour	Timothy Benson	710		
Labour	Brenda Remington	704		
Liberal Democrats	Jane Benson	249		
Turnout		4,916	29.9	

Langley Mill & Aldercar (2)
Party	Candidate	Votes	%	±%
Labour	Wendy Grace	524		
Labour	Stephanie Ward	485		
Independent	Denis Woolley	210		
Conservative	Terrence Thorpe	206		
Turnout		1,425	21.3	

Ripley (3)
Party	Candidate	Votes	%	±%
Conservative	Patricia Parkin	875		
Conservative	Patricia Turner	858		
Conservative	Kathleen Brown	774		
Labour	Charles Cutting	704		
Labour	David Neilson	665		
Labour	Stephen Freeborn	634		
Liberal Democrats	Janet Thompson	240		
Turnout		4,750	26.9	

Ripley & Marehay (2)
Party	Candidate	Votes	%	±%
Conservative	Linda Cope	562		
Conservative	Patricia Bowmar	559		
Labour	Geoffrey Carlile	549		
Labour	Janis Gregory	491		
Turnout		2,161	33.0	

Shipley Park, Horsley & Horsley Woodhouse (2)
Party	Candidate	Votes	%	±%
Conservative	John Jeffery	682		
Conservative	Gregory MacDonald	676		
Labour	Eric Lancashire	611		
Labour	Owen Gray	481		
Independent	Leslie Foster	174		
Turnout		2,624	33.0	

Somercotes (2)
Party	Candidate	Votes	%	±%
Labour	John McCabe	690		
Labour	Alan Stringer	648		
Conservative	Geoffrey Brailsford	468		
Conservative	David Beeston	412		
Turnout		2,218	26.4	

South West Parishes
Party	Candidate	Votes	%	±%
Conservative	John Cunningham	709	82.0	
Labour	Patrick Mountain	156	18.0	
Majority		553	64.0	
Turnout		865	40.0	

Swanwick (2)
Party	Candidate	Votes	%	±%
Conservative	Stephen Hayes	885		
Conservative	Allen King	792		
Labour	David Harry	476		
Labour	Pauline Griffiths	461		
Turnout		2,614	32.2	

Wingfield
Party	Candidate	Votes	%	±%
Conservative	Valerie Thorpe	670	78.0	
Labour	Peter Hare	189	22.0	
Majority		481	56.0	
Turnout		859	46.0	
