= Mallaber =

Mallaber is a surname. Notable people with the surname include:

- Gary Mallaber (born 1946), American musician
- Judy Mallaber (born 1951), English politician
