= 1894 Harrow on the Hill Urban District Council election =

1894 English local government election

The 1894 Harrow on the Hill Urban District Council election took place on 17 December 1894 to elect members of Harrow on the Hill Urban District Council in London, England. The council had been created under the Local Government Act 1894, and the whole council was up for election.

== Election result ==
Harrow on the Hill Urban District Council 9 seats Electorate: 1,183
Party	Candidate	Votes	%	±%
Independent	William J. Overhead	321	50.3	
Independent	Dr. Alfred H. Williams	312	48.9	
Independent	William W. Clowes	296	46.4	
Independent	Oliver A. Saunders	263	41.2	
Independent	John B. Smith	240	37.6	
Independent	Henry J. Strickland	234	36.7	
Independent	Joseph Hawkins	219	34.3	
Independent	Thomas Dell	215	33.7	
Independent	Joseph W. Strange	206	32.3	
Independent	Charles E.G. Webb	196	30.7	
Independent	Herbert W. Bryans	171	26.8	
Harrow Progressive Union	John Short	162	25.4	
Independent	Robert C. Gilson	144	22.6	
Independent	Dr. Reginald R.T. Risk	139	21.8	
Independent	David Pitcairn	129	20.2	
Harrow Progressive Union	Henry W. Dunmore	66	10.3	
Turnout		638		
Independent gain from		Swing		
Independent gain from		Swing		
