= Nigel Mills =

British politician (born 1974)

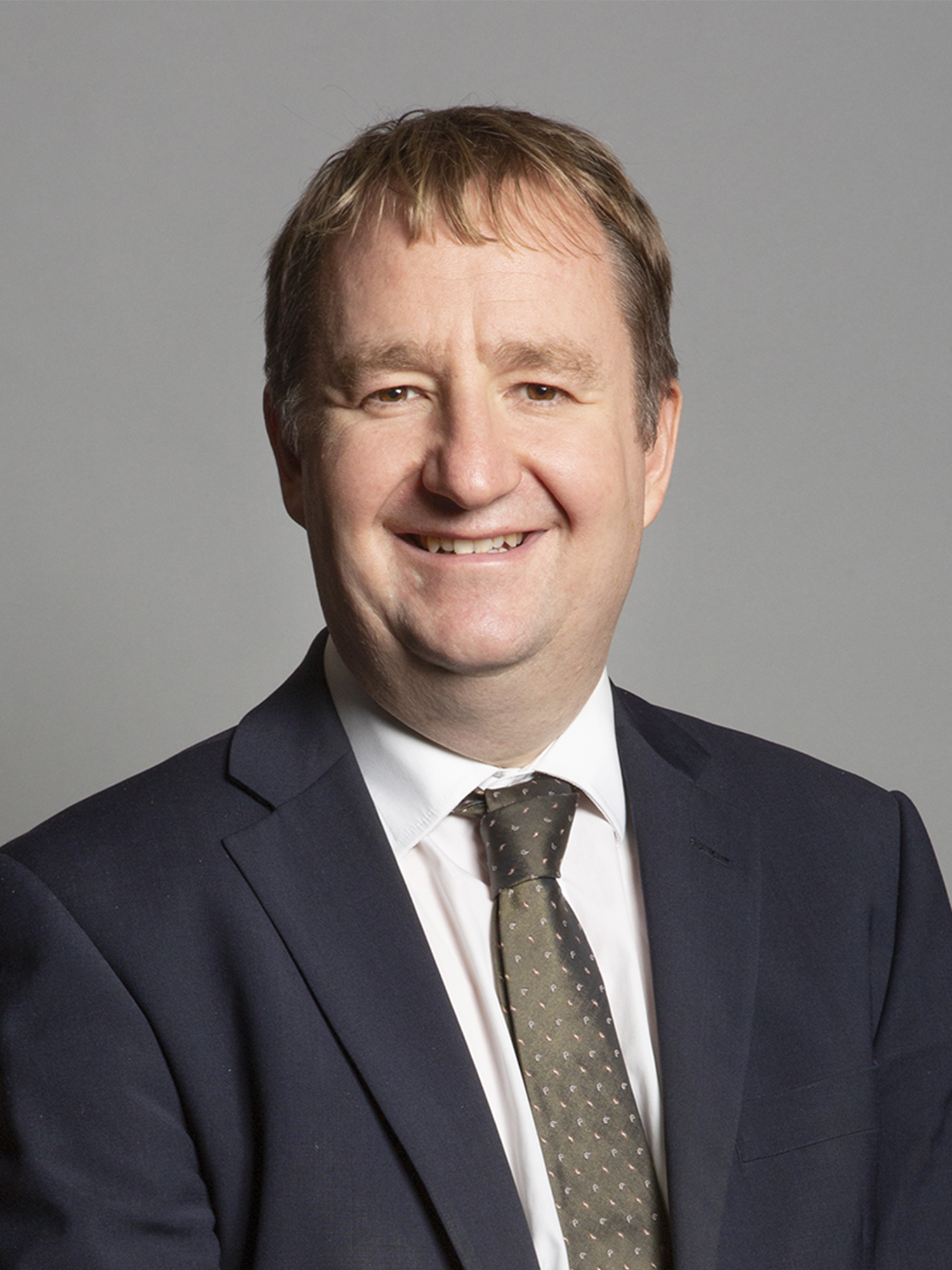
- Official portrait, 2019

Member of Parliament for Amber Valley
- In office 6 May 2010 – 30 May 2024
- Preceded by: Judy Mallaber
- Succeeded by: Linsey Farnsworth

Personal details
- Born: 1974 (age 51–52) Jacksdale, Nottinghamshire, England
- Party: Conservative
- Education: Newcastle University

Nigel John Mills (born 1974) is a British politician and former chartered accountant who was the Member of Parliament (MP) for Amber Valley in Derbyshire from the 2010 general election until he lost his seat in the 2024 general election. A member of the Conservative Party, he has campaigned for the pro-Brexit, Eurosceptic Leave Means Leave group following the 2016 European Union membership referendum.

== Early life and career ==
Mills was born in Jacksdale, Nottinghamshire, in 1974 and was privately educated at Loughborough Grammar School in Leicestershire. He went on to study Classics at Newcastle University.

Mills qualified as a Chartered accountant in 1999, working for PricewaterhouseCoopers until early 2010, moving on to Deloitte working as a Tax adviser to businesses, specialising in transfer pricing.

== Political career ==
Mills was first elected as a Conservative Councillor for Amber Valley Borough Council in 2004 when he won in Shipley Park, Horsley and Horsley Woodhouse ward. He was re-elected in 2008, but resigned the role after he became an MP. He was also a Heanor and Loscoe Town Councillor.

He was first elected as the Member of Parliament (MP) for Amber Valley in Derbyshire at the 2010 general election, when he won the seat with a majority of 536.

During Parliamentary recess in 2011, Mills volunteered with Voluntary Service Overseas in Tajikistan in a placement designed to improve the business environment and therefore stimulate the creation of jobs for more economically and socially vulnerable groups in the country. In 2012 Mills volunteered again in Tajikistan with VSO, advising the government on how to improve the business environment to attract investment and create jobs.

In October 2011, Mills voted for a referendum on Britain's membership of the European Union. In August 2013, he voted against the Government's motion calling for support of possible British intervention in Syria.

Mills attracted media attention in December 2014 after being caught playing Candy Crush on his iPad during a Work and Pensions Committee meeting, reportedly over a two and a half hour period. Mills said: "There was a bit of the meeting that I wasn't focusing on and I probably had a game or two.". He initially said to The Sun that he had been playing the game and told the newspaper that he would "try not do it again". He later apologised "unreservedly" for his behaviour.

He retained his seat at the 2015 general election and 2017 general election.

In May 2016, it was reported that Mills was one of a number of Conservative MPs being investigated by police in the 2015 party spending investigation, for allegedly spending more than the legal limit on constituency election campaign expenses. In May 2017, the Crown Prosecution Service said that while there was evidence of inaccurate spending returns, it did not "meet the test" for further action.

In September 2017, Mills was criticised in local media for claiming expenses for first class tickets when he travelled by rail, despite official guidance from parliamentary watchdog IPSA – set up in the wake of the 2009 expenses scandal – saying politicians should "consider value for money" when booking tickets. Mills stated that his claims were permissible within the expenses rules and that the first class tickets were cheaper than some standard class tickets available.

Mills was a member of the Work and Pensions Select Committee, Northern Ireland Affairs Select Committee, and the Immigration Bill Committee, having previously sat on the Administration Committee.

At the 2019 general election, Mills increased his vote share by over 7%, and retained Amber Valley with a majority of 16,886 votes.

In the 2024 United Kingdom general election he lost his seat to Labour’s Linsey Farnsworth with his vote share dropping by 38.6%.

== Personal life ==
Mills was the partner of Gillian Shaw, the Conservative candidate for Amber Valley in the general elections of 2001 and 2005; she died of cancer in 2006. He became engaged to Alice Elizabeth Ward in January 2013; they married in September 2013.

He lives in Oakerthorpe in Derbyshire and London. He is a season ticket holder at Notts County F.C. and is a member of Nottinghamshire County Cricket Club.

== Award ==
In November 2013, Mills shared The Spectator's Parliamentarian of the Year Award along with 14 other MPs for voting against tighter regulation of the press, which had been proposed following developments such as the News International phone hacking scandal. The group of 15 rebels lost the vote as 531 MPs voted for the bill in question, with their vote being on the grounds of protecting press freedom.

Parliament of the United Kingdom
Preceded by Judy Mallaber	Member of Parliament for Amber Valley; 2010–2024	Succeeded by Linsey Farnsworth
