= Ripley Town Hall =

Municipal building in Ripley, Derbyshire, England

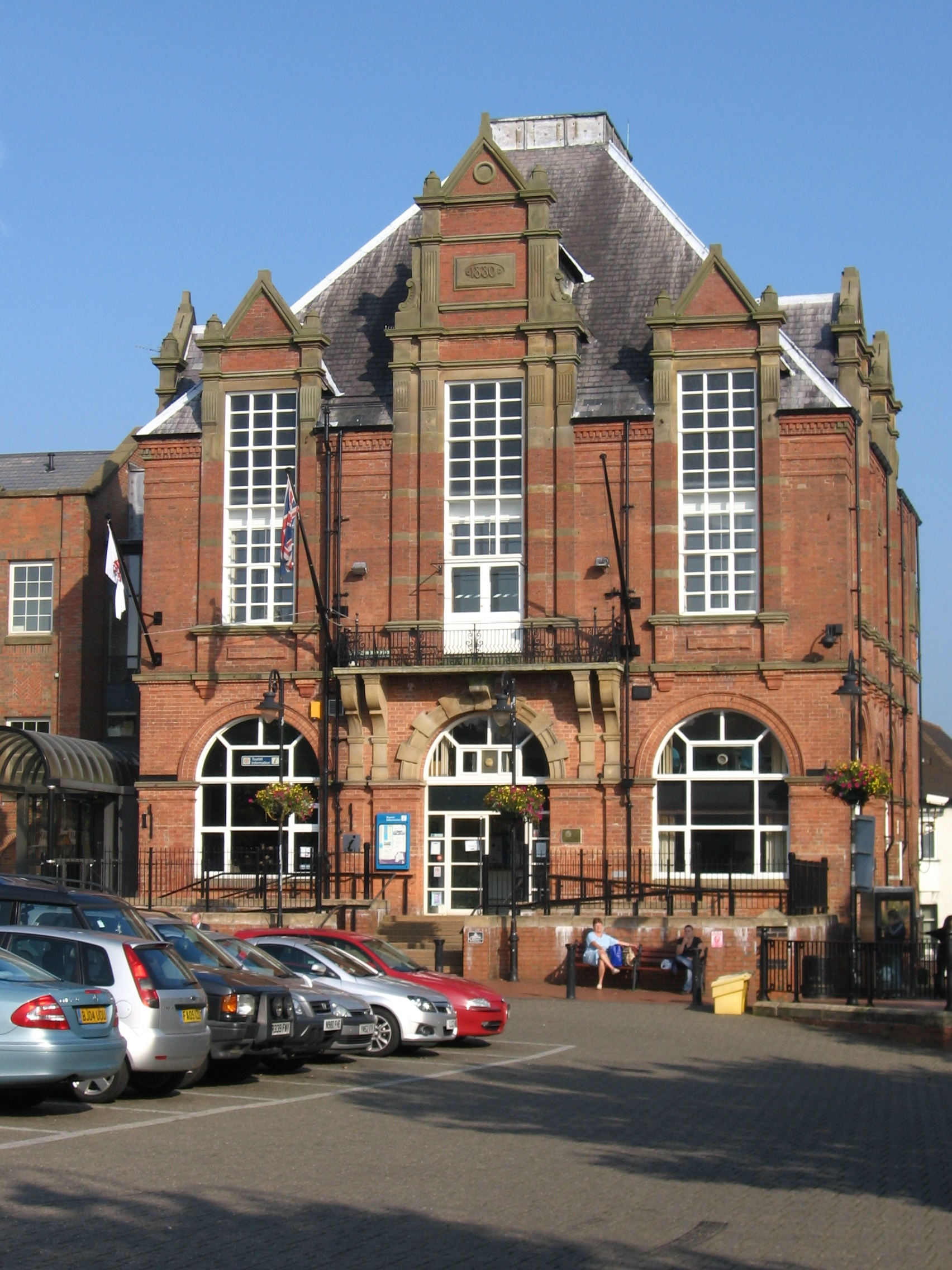
- Ripley Town Hall in 2008

- Shown in Derbyshire
- 53.0506°N 1.4076°W
- Location: Market Place, Ripley

History
- Built: 1881

Site notes
- Architect: George Eyre
- Architectural style: Victorian style

Ripley Town Hall is a municipal building in the Market Place, Ripley, Derbyshire, England. The town hall is the headquarters of Amber Valley Borough Council.

== History ==
King Henry III awarded the town the right to hold markets twice a year in 1251. In the early 19th century, civic leaders decided to erect a market hall to provide shelter for the markets: the site they selected on the north side of the Market Place had originally been occupied by a small cottage known as the "White House". The cottage was duly demolished and the market hall was erected and fully functioning by 1835.

After the first market hall became dilapidated, the local board of health decided, in 1880, to demolish it and to procure a new structure. The new building, which was designed by George Eyre in the Victorian style, was built in red brick with stone dressings and was officially opened on 2 March 1881. The design involved a symmetrical main frontage with three bays facing onto the Market Place; the central bay featured a doorway with a fanlight and a segmental stone surround: it was flanked by brackets supporting a stone balcony with iron railings; there was a tall French door on the first floor with a date stone and gable above. The other two bays contained round headed windows on the ground floor, tall windows on the first floor and gables above.

After the area became an urban district in 1894, an extensive programme of works was initiated in December 1906 to convert the market hall into a town hall: the works, which involved a council chamber and offices being created on the ground floor, a public hall being established on the first floor and offices for council officers and their departments being built on the second floor, were completed in 1907.

The building continued to serve as a meeting place for Ripley Urban District Council for much of the 20th century and remained the local seat of government after the enlarged Amber Valley Borough Council was formed in 1974. The building was extended to the west in the 1990s to create a bridge across the road to the new district council offices. A mezzanine floor was also created in the town hall at that time.

A request for planning permission to demolish the town hall and erect a drive-through restaurant was considered by the council in the early 1990s but never progressed. Amber Valley Borough Council tried to market the building in June 2011. In that connection the borough council asked English Heritage to advise whether the building was a possible candidate for listing. English Heritage assessed the building as in September 2011 but decided, on account of all the alterations that had taken place, that the town hall should not be listed. A local campaign group organised a petition to retain the town hall and the proposed disposal ultimately did not proceed.

The building also remains the meeting place of Ripley Town Council.
