= 1999 Amber Valley Borough Council election =

1999 UK local government election

The 1999 Amber Valley Borough Council election took place on 6 May 1999 to elect members of Amber Valley Borough Council in Derbyshire, England. One third of the council was up for election and the Labour Party stayed in overall control of the council.

After the election, the composition of the council was

- Labour 32
- Conservative 11

== Election result ==
Amber Valley local election result 1999
Party	Seats	Gains	Losses	Net gain/loss	Seats %	Votes %	Votes	+/−
Labour	8			-3	53.3			
Conservative	7			+3	46.7			
