= Linsey Farnsworth =

British politician (elected 2024)

Linsey Farnsworth MP
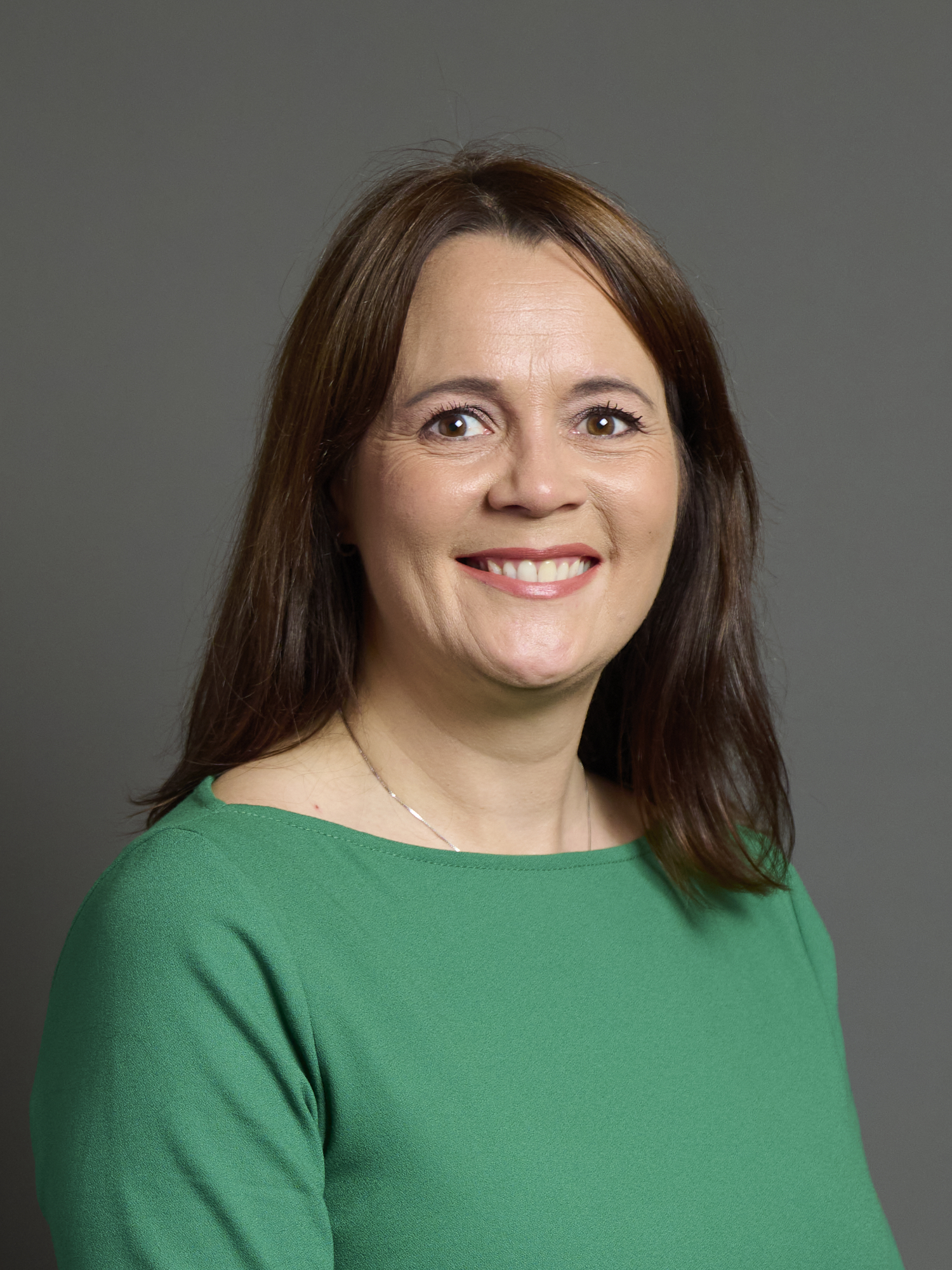
- Official portrait, 2024

Member of Parliament for Amber Valley
- Incumbent
- Assumed office 4 July 2024
- Preceded by: Nigel Mills
- Majority: 3,554 (8.3%)

Member of Amber Valley Borough Council for Kilburn, Denby, Holbrook and Horsley
- In office 4 May 2023 – 19 March 2025

Personal details
- Party: Labour
- Profession: Solicitor
- Website: Official website

Linsey Jayne Farnsworth is a Labour politician and lawyer who has served as Member of Parliament (MP) for Amber Valley since 2024.

== Early life and career ==
Farnsworth was raised in Erewash, Derbyshire. Her father was a coal miner who, following mine closures, retrained as a bricklayer and her stepmother was a nurse.

Qualifying as a solicitor in 2001, Farnsworth worked as a criminal solicitor for the Crown Prosecution Service (CPS) for over two decades. During her tenure at the CPS, she prosecuted serious and organised crime as an international liaison prosecutor.

== Political career ==
In 2023, Farnsworth was elected as a Member of Amber Valley Borough Council for Kilburn, Denby, Holbrook and Horsley. She became the first Labour councillor to represent the ward in over 20 years, and was also elected to the Parish Councils in Horsley and Kilburn.

Farnsworth was elected as MP for Amber Valley at the 2024 general election, defeating incumbent Conservative Nigel Mills. Since October 2024, Farnsworth has sat as a member of the Justice Select Committee. On 11 May 2026, Farnsworth was appointed Parliamentary Private Secretary (PPS) to the Justice Secretary.

In March 2026, Linsey Farnsworth's Private Members' Bill, Unauthorised Entry to Football Matches Act 2026, became law. The Act makes it illegal to enter a football match without a ticket, to knowingly attempt to gain entry using forged tickets and passes, or by posing as a member of stadium or playing staff. Offenders will be arrested and could face a football banning order of up to five years and a fine of up to £1,000.

In May 2026, she replaced Melanie Ward as parliamentary private secretary to the Ministry of Justice.

== Personal life ==
Farnsworth is married with children.

Parliament of the United Kingdom
Preceded by Nigel Mills	Member of Parliament for Amber Valley; 2024–present	Incumbent
