= Judy Mallaber =

British politician (born 1951)

Member of Parliament for Amber Valley
- In office 1 May 1997 – 12 April 2010
- Preceded by: Phillip Oppenheim
- Succeeded by: Nigel Mills

Personal details
- Born: 10 July 1951 (age 75) Colindale, Middlesex, England, UK
- Party: Labour
- Education: St Anne's College, Oxford

Clare Judith Mallaber (born 10 July 1951) is a British Labour Party politician, who was the Member of Parliament for Amber Valley from 1997 to 2010, when she lost her seat to the Conservative Party's Nigel Mills.

== Early life ==
She was educated at the North London Collegiate School and St Anne's College, Oxford, gaining a BA Honours degree. From 1975–85 she was a research officer for National Union of Public Employees (NUPE), becoming Head of Research. In the 1970s, she was a member of the Communist Party of Great Britain. From 1987–96, she was the Director of the Local Government Information Unit. She was a member of the Hornsey and Wood Green CLP.

== Political career ==
Mallaber was selected to stand for election for Labour through an all-women shortlist. She was elected for the seat of Amber Valley at the 1997 general election defeating the Conservative incumbent Phillip Oppenheim.

She sat on the Treasury Committee and on the Trade and Industry Committee (from 2003). Having worked for NUPE, she has interests in employment rights, as well as animal welfare, the feminist movement and the textile industry. She chaired the Clothing, Textiles & Footwear Group (APPG) from July 1999, and was a member of the Education & Skills Select Committee (from 1997 to 2001). She was the Chair of the Labour Research Department.

She is a member of UNISON and the Liberty and Socialist Education Association. For the year ending April 2006, she claimed £5,649 in travel expenses. In 2006, she went twice to the Democratic Republic of Congo as an election observer.

She lost her seat in 2010 to the Conservative Party's Nigel Mills by 538 votes. Amber Valley was the 24th most marginal seat in the country in the 2010 general election. Mallaber did not contest the 2015 general election.

Parliament of the United Kingdom
Preceded by Phillip Oppenheim	Member of Parliament for Amber Valley; 1997–2010	Succeeded by Nigel Mills
