= Amber Sound FM =

Coordinates: 53.048814°N 1.403943°W

England
- Broadcast area: Amber Valley, Derbyshire
- Frequencies: 107.2 and 98.4 FM

Programming
- Format: Pop Music

Ownership
- Owner: Amber Valley Broadcasting

History
- First air date: 4 October 2008

Links
- Website: AmberSoundFM.com

Amber Sound FM is a Community Radio station based in the Amber Valley, Derbyshire, England. It was awarded a five-year community licence by OFCOM in 2008 after several Restricted Service Licence broadcasts. Amber Sound said it would "encourage local people, young and old, to become part of the station".

The station is on 107.2 and 98.4 FM in the Amber Valley, on DAB across the UK, and online via their website.

== History ==
Local radio first appeared in Amber Valley in 1994 when Glyn Williams began Valley Radio. Backed by the local MP the station broadcast from a railway carriage at the Midland Railway Centre (now Midland Railway - Butterley) in Ripley, Derbyshire. This was followed by three FM licences broadcast from office space located in Oxford St, Ripley.

Following the group's second broadcast, musical differences caused a split. Amber Sound FM was born and ran alongside Valley Radio. Run by local DJ Chris Smelt and local businessman Alan Farrar, Amber Sound FM held two restricted service licences in October 1995 and August 1996.

Both stations felt that Amber Valley was underserved by other local stations in the area. The team went to work to give Amber Valley a station of its own. The two groups ceased in 1996 when it seemed the Radio Authority were not willing to grant licences in the area.

Meanwhile the first rounds of community licences had been awarded to stations around the UK when in 2006 another station 'Amber FM' started. The station, run by Eddie Fowler, prompted Chris Knight to get interested again and Eddie and Chris reformed under the name of Amber Sound FM in 2007 and performed two further RSL broadcasts. During these broadcasts Glyn Williams joined the group and so all three radio groups were now united under one banner.

In late 2007 Ofcom the new licensing authority advertised for applicants for a new tier of community radio in the East Midlands. Amber Sound FM got their licence in May 2008. In October 2008 the station began broadcasting. The first ever song to be played on Amber Sound was "Easy" by Commodores.

The station also ran a fortnightly show produced by local students of Mill Hill School, Ripley and Alfreton Grange, Alfreton. This was known as the "Teatime Takeover" and ran on Sundays from 17:00-19:00. The show ran for approximately seven months until it was replaced by AT40 with Ryan Seacrest.
