= Amber Valley (constituency) =

UK Parliament constituency (since 1983)

Coordinates: 53.03°N 1.40°W

- County constituency for the House of Commons
- Interactive map of boundaries since 2010
- Location within the East Midlands
- County: Derbyshire
- Population: 87,883 (2011 census)
- Electorate: 70,625 (March 2020)
- Major settlements: Ripley, Alfreton, Heanor

Current constituency
- Created: 1983
- Member of Parliament: Linsey Farnsworth (Labour)
- Seats: One
- Created from: Belper, Derbyshire South East and Ilkeston

Amber Valley is a constituency (Note: A county constituency (for the purposes of election expenses and type of returning officer)) in Derbyshire, represented in the House of Commons of the UK Parliament. (Note: As with all constituencies, the constituency elects one Member of Parliament (MP) by the first past the post system of election at least every five years.) It has been represented in Parliament by Linsey Farnsworth, a Labour politician, since the 2024 general election.

== Constituency profile ==
The Amber Valley constituency is located in the east of Derbyshire, covering the eastern half of the Amber Valley local government district. The constituency includes the market and manufacturing towns of Alfreton, Heanor and Ripley, as well as a number of nearby villages.

The area has a history of coal mining, ironworking and manufacturing. On average, residents of the constituency are older, have a lower household income and are less likely to be degree-educated than the country as a whole. The constituency has few ethnic-minority residents, with 98% of the population being white.

The local borough council has historically often switched between Labour and Conservative control. The constituency's three towns elected Labour councillors at most recent borough council election in 2023, but elected Conservative councillors at the most recent county council election in 2021. Voters in the constituency strongly supported leaving the European Union in the 2016 referendum.

== History ==
The constituency was created in 1983, and was held by Phillip Oppenheim of the Conservative Party from its creation until Judy Mallaber of the Labour Party won the seat in 1997. She was narrowly defeated in 2010 by Nigel Mills, a Conservative, who increased his majority in 2015 and 2017. Amber Valley has been a bellwether seat in having been won by the winning party at each general election, since its creation.

== Boundaries ==
=== Historic ===
Boundaries of Amber Valley from 1997 to 2010

1983–1997: The District of Amber Valley wards of Aldercar, Alfreton East, Alfreton West, Codnor, Denby and Horsley Woodhouse, Heage and Ambergate, Heanor and Loscoe, Heanor East, Heanor West, Holbrook and Horsley, Kilburn, Riddings, Ripley, Ripley and Marehay, Shipley Park, Somercotes, Swanwick, and Wingfield, and the Borough of Erewash wards of Breadsall and Morley, Little Eaton, and Stanley.

1997–2010: The Borough of Amber Valley wards of Aldercar, Alfreton East, Alfreton West, Codnor, Crich, Denby and Horsley Woodhouse, Heage and Ambergate, Heanor and Loscoe, Heanor East, Heanor West, Holbrook and Horsley, Kilburn, Riddings, Ripley, Ripley and Marehay, Shipley Park, Somercotes, Swanwick, and Wingfield, and the Borough of Erewash wards of Breadsall and Morley, Little Eaton, and Stanley.

2010–2023: The Borough of Amber Valley wards of Alfreton, Codnor and Waingroves, Heage and Ambergate, Heanor and Loscoe, Heanor East, Heanor West, Ironville and Riddings, Kilburn, Denby and Holbrook, Langley Mill and Aldercar, Ripley, Ripley and Marehay, Shipley Park, Horsley and Horsley Woodhouse, Somercotes, Swanwick, and Wingfield.

=== Current ===
Further to a local government boundary review which came into effect in May 2023, the constituency now comprises the following wards of the Borough of Amber Valley:

- Alfreton; Codnor, Langley Mill & Aldercar; South Wingfield from Crich & South Wingfield ward; Heage & Ambergate; Heanor East; Heanor West & Loscoe; Ironville & Riddings; Kilburn, Denby, Holbrook & Horsley; Ripley; Ripley & Marehay; Smalley, Shipley & Horsley Woodhouse; Somercotes; Swanwick.

The 2023 review of Westminster constituencies, which was based on the ward structure in place at 1 December 2020, left the boundaries unchanged.

== Members of Parliament ==
Belper, Derbyshire South East and Ilkeston prior to 1983

Election	Member	Party
1983	Phillip Oppenheim	Conservative
1997	Judy Mallaber	Labour
2010	Nigel Mills	Conservative
2024	Linsey Farnsworth	Labour

== Elections ==
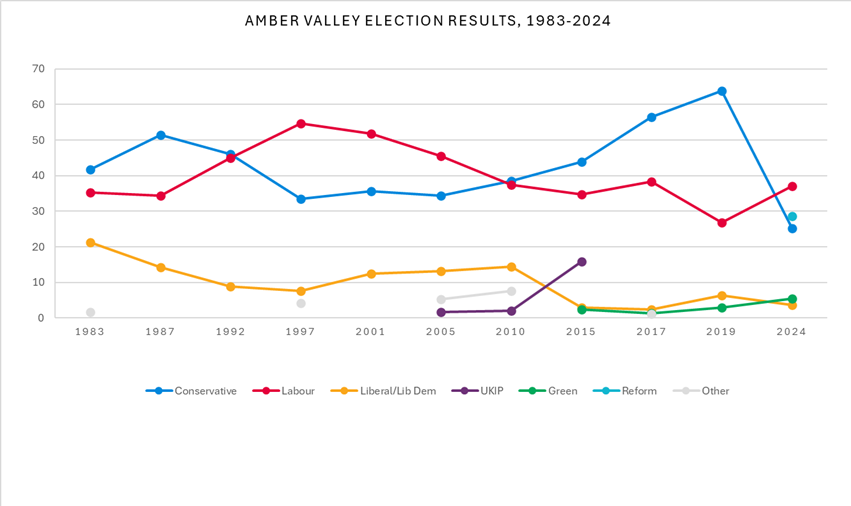
Amber Valley election results

=== Elections in the 2020s ===
General election 2024: Amber Valley
Party	Candidate	Votes	%	±%
Labour	Linsey Farnsworth	15,746	37.0	▲10.2
Reform	Alex Stevenson	12,192	28.7	new
Conservative	Nigel Mills	10,725	25.2	▼38.6
Green	Matt McGuinness	2,278	5.4	▲2.4
Liberal Democrats	Kate Smith	1,590	3.7	▼2.6
Majority		3,554	8.3	
Turnout		42,531	59.4	▼5.6
Registered electors		71,546		
Labour gain from Conservative		Swing	▲24.4	

=== Elections in the 2010s ===
2019 notional result
Party	Vote	%
Conservative	29,118	63.8
Labour	12,227	26.8
Liberal Democrats	2,875	6.3
Green Party	1,389	3.0
Majority	16,891	37.0
Turnout	45,609	64.6
Electorate	70,625	

General election 2019: Amber Valley
Party	Candidate	Votes	%	±%
Conservative	Nigel Mills	29,096	63.8	▲7.3
Labour	Adam Thompson	12,210	26.8	▼11.6
Liberal Democrats	Kate Smith	2,873	6.3	▲3.9
Green	Lian Pizzey	1,388	3.0	▲1.6
Majority		16,886	37.0	▲18.9
Turnout		45,567	65.1	▼2.2
Registered electors		69,976		
Conservative hold		Swing	▲9.5	

General election 2017: Amber Valley
Party	Candidate	Votes	%	±%
Conservative	Nigel Mills	25,905	56.5	▲12.5
Labour	James Dawson	17,605	38.4	▲3.6
Liberal Democrats	Kate Smith	1,100	2.4	▼0.6
Green	Matt McGuinness	650	1.4	▼1.0
Independent	Daniel Bamford	551	1.2	New
Majority		8,300	18.1	▲8.9
Turnout		45,811	67.3	▲1.5
Registered electors		68,065		
Conservative hold		Swing	▲4.5	

General election 2015: Amber Valley
Party	Candidate	Votes	%	±%
Conservative	Nigel Mills	20,106	44.0	▲5.4
Labour	Kevin Gillott	15,901	34.8	▼2.6
UKIP	Stuart Bent	7,263	15.9	▲13.9
Liberal Democrats	Kate Smith	1,360	3.0	▼11.4
Green	John Devine	1,087	2.4	New
Majority		4,205	9.2	▲8.0
Turnout		45,717	65.8	▲0.3
Registered electors		69,510		
Conservative hold		Swing	▲4.0	

Going into the 2015 general election, this was the 24th most marginal constituency in Great Britain, Labour requiring a swing from the Conservatives of 0.6% to take the seat (based on the result of the 2010 general election).

General election 2010: Amber Valley
Party	Candidate	Votes	%	±%
Conservative	Nigel Mills	17,746	38.6	▲4.7
Labour	Judy Mallaber	17,210	37.4	▼9.0
Liberal Democrats	Tom Snowdon	6,636	14.4	▲2.1
BNP	Michael Clarke	3,195	7.0	▲4.4
UKIP	Sue Ransome	906	2.0	▲0.3
Monster Raving Loony	Sam Thing	265	0.6	New
Majority		536	1.2	▼10.0
Turnout		45,958	65.5	▲1.5
Registered electors		70,171		
Conservative gain from Labour		Swing	▲6.9	

=== Elections in the 2000s ===
General election 2005: Amber Valley
Party	Candidate	Votes	%	±%
Labour	Judy Mallaber	21,593	45.6	▼6.3
Conservative	Gillian Shaw	16,318	34.4	▼1.3
Liberal Democrats	Kate Smith	6,225	13.1	▲0.7
BNP	Paul Snell	1,243	2.6	New
Veritas	Alex Stevenson	1,224	2.6	New
UKIP	Hugh Price	788	1.7	New
Majority		5,275	11.2	▼5.0
Turnout		47,391	62.9	▲2.6
Registered electors		75,269		
Labour hold		Swing	▼3.8	

General election 2001: Amber Valley
Party	Candidate	Votes	%	±%
Labour	Judy Mallaber	23,101	51.9	▼2.8
Conservative	Gillian Shaw	15,874	35.7	▲2.3
Liberal Democrats	Kate Smith	5,538	12.4	▲4.7
Majority		7,227	16.2	▼5.1
Turnout		44,513	60.3	▼15.7
Registered electors		73,798		
Labour hold		Swing	▼2.5	

=== Elections in the 1990s ===
General election 1997: Amber Valley
Party	Candidate	Votes	%	±%
Labour	Judy Mallaber	29,943	54.7	▲10.3
Conservative	Phillip Oppenheim	18,330	33.4	▼13.0
Liberal Democrats	Roger Shelley	4,219	7.7	▼1.4
Referendum	Irene McGibbon	2,283	4.2	New
Majority		11,613	21.3	N/A
Turnout		54,775	76.0	▼8.7
Registered electors		72,116		
Labour gain from Conservative		Swing	▲11.7	

General election 1992: Amber Valley
Party	Candidate	Votes	%	±%
Conservative	Phillip Oppenheim	27,418	46.1	▼5.3
Labour	John Cooper	26,706	44.9	▲10.5
Liberal Democrats	Graham Brocklebank	5,294	8.9	▼5.3
Majority		712	1.2	▼15.8
Turnout		59,418	84.7	▲3.5
Registered electors		70,155		
Conservative hold		Swing	▼7.9	

=== Elections in the 1980s ===
General election 1987: Amber Valley
Party	Candidate	Votes	%	±%
Conservative	Phillip Oppenheim	28,603	51.4	▲9.7
Labour	David Bookbinder	19,103	34.4	▼0.9
Liberal	Stewart Reynolds	7,904	14.2	▼7.1
Majority		9,500	17.0	▲10.6
Turnout		55,610	81.2	▲4.0
Registered electors		68,478		
Conservative hold		Swing	▲5.3	

General election 1983: Amber Valley
Party	Candidate	Votes	%	±%
Conservative	Phillip Oppenheim	21,502	41.7	
Labour	David Bookbinder	18,184	35.3	
Liberal	Brian Johnson	10,989	21.3	
Independent	Peter Griffiths	856	1.7	
Majority		3,318	6.4	
Turnout		51,531	77.2	
Registered electors		66,720		
Conservative win (new seat)				

== See also ==
- Parliamentary constituencies in Derbyshire
