= Bakewell Urban District =

Former local government area in the UK

Coordinates: 53.213°N 1.6759°W

Bakewell
- Bakewell Urban District shown within Derbyshire in 1970
- Area
  - 1911: 3,061 acres (12.39 km^{2})
  - 1961: 3,061 acres (12.39 km^{2})
- Population
  - 1911: 3,078
  - 1961: 3,606
- History
  - Created: 1894
  - Abolished: 1974
  - Succeeded by: West Derbyshire
- Status: Urban District
- Government: Bakewell Urban District Council
  - HQ: Bakewell

Bakewell was an Urban District in Derbyshire, England, from 1894 to 1974. It was created under the Local Government Act 1894.

The district was abolished in 1974 under the Local Government Act 1972 and combined with various other local government districts in western Derbyshire to form the new West Derbyshire district.
