= Bolsover Urban District =

Historical administrative district in Derbyshire, England

Coordinates: 53.2304°N 1.2875°W

Bolsover
- Bolsover Urban District shown within Derbyshire in 1970
- Area
  - 1911: 4,955 acres (20.05 km^{2})
  - 1961: 4,526 acres (18.32 km^{2})
- Population
  - 1911: 11,214
  - 1961: 11,772
- History
  - Created: 1894
  - Abolished: 1974
  - Succeeded by: Bolsover district
- Status: Urban District
- Government: Bolsover Urban District Council
  - HQ: Bolsover

Bolsover was an Urban District in Derbyshire, England, from 1894 to 1974. It was created under the Local Government Act 1894.

The district was abolished in 1974 under the Local Government Act 1972 and combined with Blackwell Rural District and Clowne Rural District to form the new Bolsover district.
