= Harrow on the Hill Urban District =

Former local government area in the UK

Coordinates: 51.57°N 0.34°W

Harrow on the Hill
- Area
  - 1911: 2,028 acres (8.21 km^{2})
  - 1931: 2,129 acres (8.62 km^{2})
- Population
  - 1911: 19,637
  - 1931: 26,380
- History
  - Created: 1894
  - Abolished: 1934
  - Succeeded by: Harrow Urban District
- Status: Urban district

Harrow on the Hill was an urban district in Middlesex, England from 1894 to 1934.

It was created under the Local Government Act 1894. This Act split the historic parish of Harrow on the Hill several ways, with parts becoming the new parishes of Harrow Weald, Wealdstone and Wembley. The remaining part of the parish formed Harrow on the Hill urban district.

It took in 101 acres (0.41 km^{2}) from the disbanded parish of Northolt in 1928.

In 1934 the district was abolished by a County Review Order, becoming part of the new Harrow Urban District; a precursor of the London Borough of Harrow.
