= Belper Urban District =

Government district in Derbyshire, England

Coordinates: 53.029°N 1.475°W

Belper
- Belper Urban District shown within Derbyshire in 1970
- Area
  - 1911: 3,183 acres (12.88 km^{2})
  - 1961: 4,294 acres (17.38 km^{2})
- Population
  - 1911: 11,640
  - 1961: 15,552
- History
  - Created: 1894
  - Abolished: 1974
  - Succeeded by: Amber Valley
- Status: Urban District
- Government: Belper Urban District Council
  - HQ: Belper

Belper was an urban district in Derbyshire, England, from 1894 to 1974. It was created under the Local Government Act 1894.

It was enlarged in 1934 when part of the civil parish of Milford was transferred to the district from Belper Rural District.

The district was abolished in 1974 under the Local Government Act 1972 and combined with various other local government districts in central and eastern Derbyshire to form the new Amber Valley district.
