= Ravensdale Park =

Coordinates: 52.991°N 1.591°W

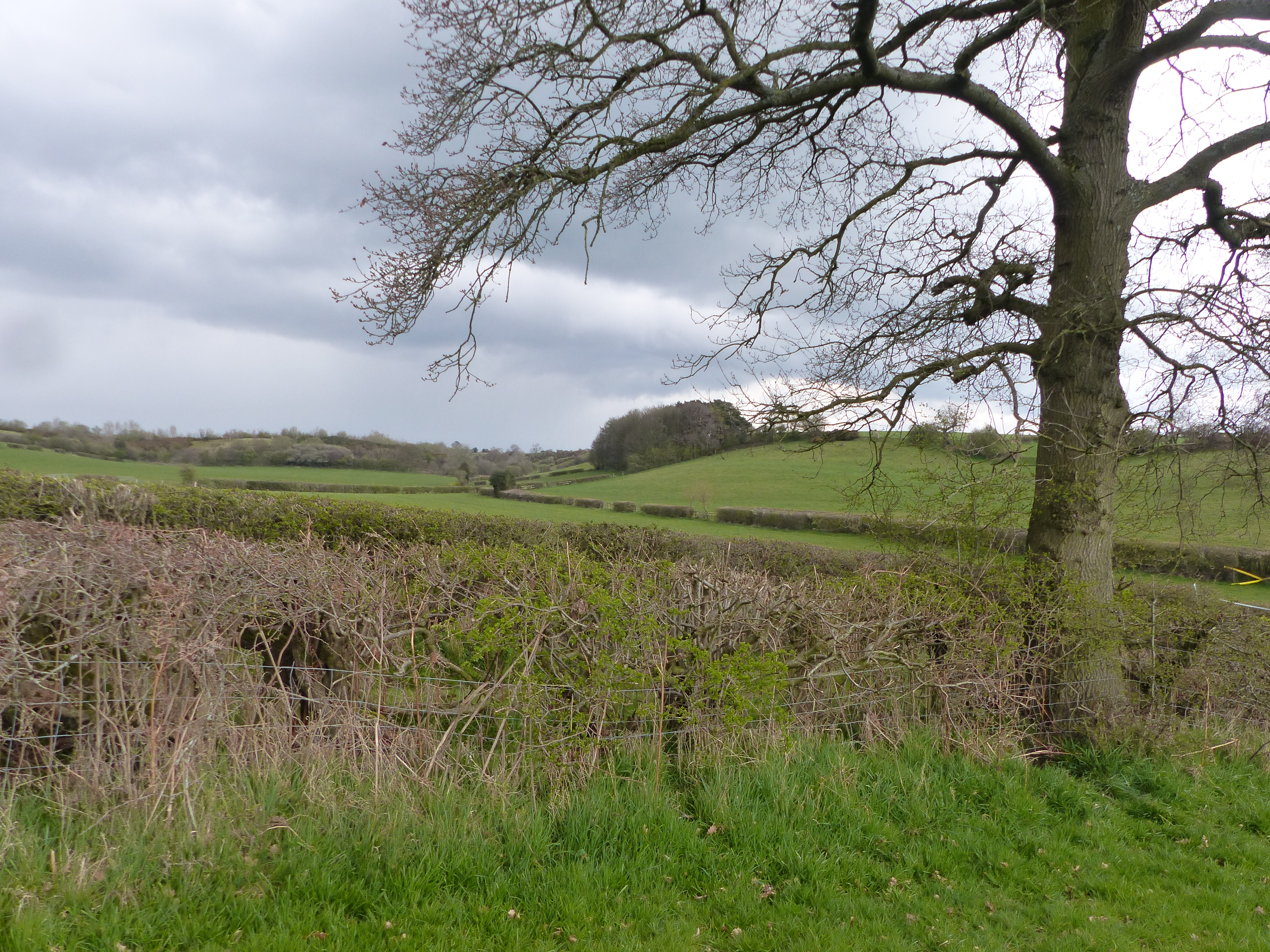
- The site of the deer course in Ravensdale Park, where dogs were raced in pursuit of live deer. Historic England calls this "by far the best and at present the earliest known example of a nationally rare deer park feature".

- Location within Derbyshire
- OS grid reference: SK275438
- District: Derbyshire Dales
- Shire county: Derbyshire
- Region: East Midlands
- Country: England
- Sovereign state: United Kingdom
- Post town: ASHBOURNE
- Postcode district: DE6
- Police: Derbyshire
- Fire: Derbyshire
- Ambulance: East Midlands

Ravensdale Park is a civil parish in the Derbyshire Dales district of Derbyshire roughly 3 miles (5 km) WSW of Belper, Derbyshire, England, midway between Turnditch and Brailsford. The population of the civil parish as taken at the 2011 Census was less than 100. Details are included in the South Derbyshire civil parish of Dalbury Lees.

It originated as one of the seven royal parks within Duffield Frith. In time it was the location of the chief hunting lodge for the Frith, and there are frequent entries in the records of the Duchy of Lancaster referring to it. John of Gaunt visited frequently. Parts of the former deer park are designated as a scheduled monument.

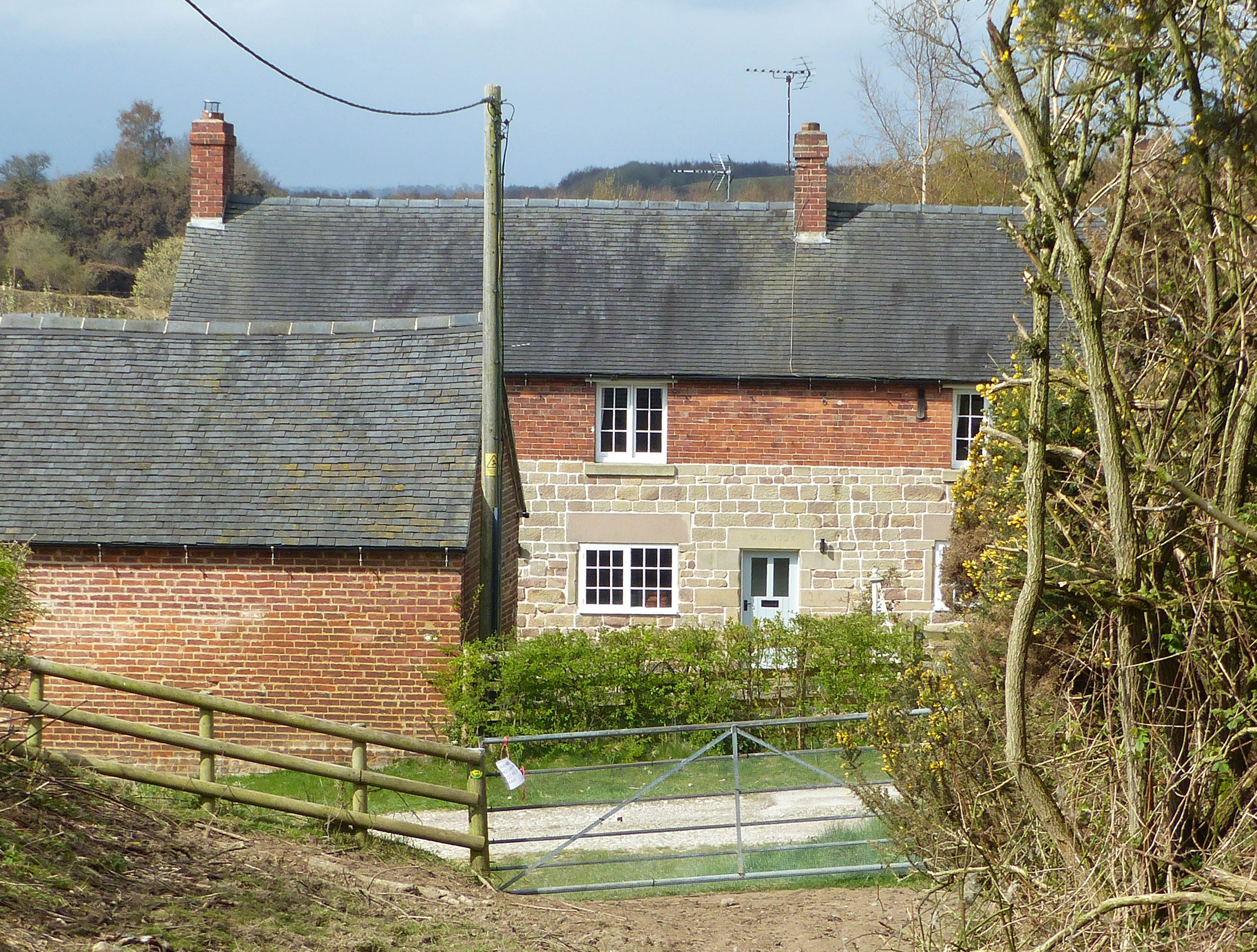
Park Farmhouse

There is one Grade II listed building in the parish, the farmhouse at Park Farm, a two-storey building dated 1728 with coursed squared sandstone walls to the ground floor and red brick on the upper storey.
