= Heanor Urban District =

Former local government area in Derbyshire, England

Coordinates: 53°00′49″N 1°21′14″W

Heanor
- Area
  - 1911: 3,509 acres (14.20 km^{2})
  - 1961: 4,419 acres (17.88 km^{2})
- Population
  - 1911: 19,851
  - 1961: 23,870
- History
  - Created: 1894
  - Abolished: 1974
  - Succeeded by: Amber Valley
- Status: Urban District
- Government: Heanor Urban District Council
  - HQ: Heanor

Heanor was an urban district in Derbyshire, England, from 1894 to 1974. It was created under the Local Government Act 1894.

The district was abolished in 1974 under the Local Government Act 1972 and combined with the Alfreton, Belper, Heanor and Ripley urban districts and Belper Rural District to form the new Amber Valley district.
