= Alfreton Urban District =

Former local government area of Derbyshire, England

Coordinates: 53.097°N 1.380°W

Alfreton
- Alfreton Urban District shown within Derbyshire in 1970
- Area
  - 1911: 4,626 acres (18.72 km^{2})
  - 1961: 5,176 acres (20.95 km^{2})
- Population
  - 1911: 19,046
  - 1961: 22,999
- History
  - Created: 1894
  - Abolished: 1974
  - Succeeded by: Amber Valley
- Status: Urban District
- Government: Alfreton Urban District Council
  - HQ: Alfreton

Alfreton was an urban district in Derbyshire, England, from 1894 to 1974. It was created under the Local Government Act 1894.

It was enlarged in 1935 when part of the Codnor Park civil parish was transferred to the district.

The district was abolished in 1974 under the Local Government Act 1972 and combined with various other local government districts in eastern and central Derbyshire to form the new Amber Valley district.
