= Amber Valley =

Coordinates: 53.00°N 1.40°W

Borough of Amber Valley
- Non-metropolitan district and borough
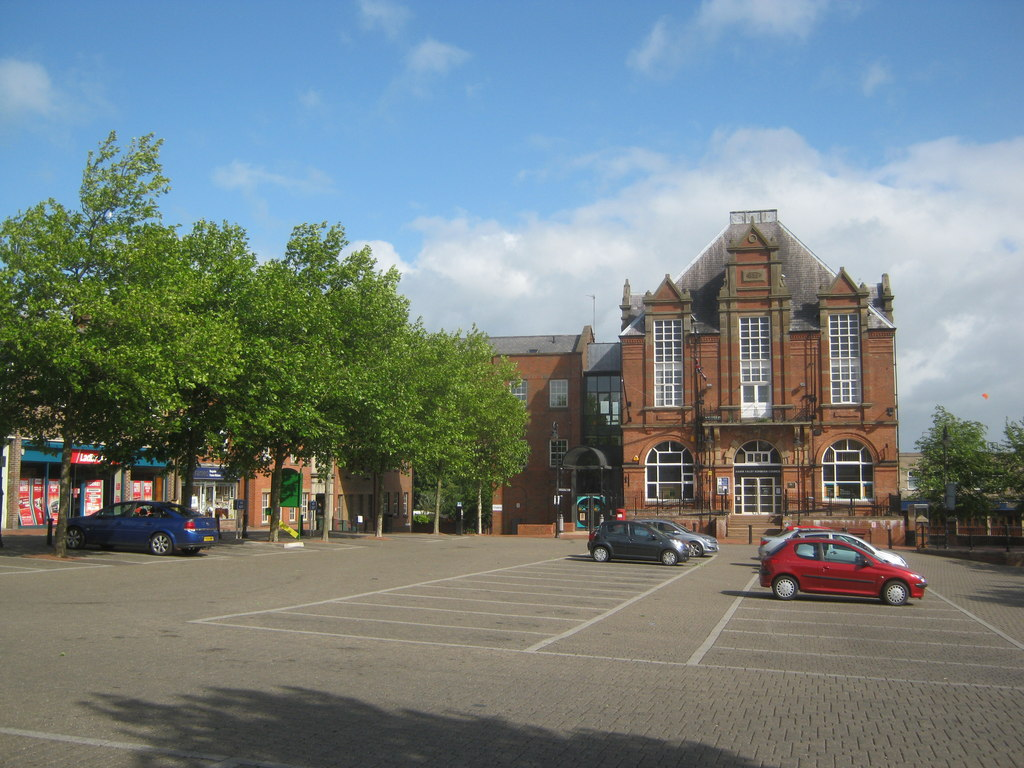
- Ripley, the administrative centre of Amber Valley and the second largest settlement in the borough

- Coat of arms

- Shown within Derbyshire
- Sovereign state: United Kingdom
- Constituent country: England
- Region: East Midlands
- Ceremonial county: Derbyshire
- Admin. HQ: Ripley

Government
  - Type: Amber Valley Borough Council
  - Leadership: Leader & Cabinet
  - MPs: Linsey Farnsworth (Lab, Amber Valley); Jonathan Davies (Lab, Mid Derbyshire); John Whitby (Lab, Derbyshire Dales)

Area
  - Total: 102 sq mi (265 km^{2})
  - Rank: 132nd

Population (2025)
  - Total: 131,894
  - Rank: Ranked 186th
  - Density: 1,290/sq mi (498/km^{2})

Ethnicity (2021)
  - Ethnic groups: List: 97.3% White; 1.2% Mixed; 1% Asian; 0.3% Black; 0.2% other

Religion (2021)
  - Religion: List: 50.2% no religion; 48.2% Christianity; 1.3% other; 0.3% Islam
- Time zone: UTC+0 (Greenwich Mean Time)
  - Summer (DST): UTC+1 (British Summer Time)
- Postcode: DE, NG
- ONS code: 17UB (ONS) E07000032 (GSS)

Amber Valley is a local government district with borough status in the east of Derbyshire, England, taking its name from the River Amber. Its council is based in Ripley. The district covers a semi-rural area lying to the north of the city of Derby. The district contains four main towns whose economy was based on coal mining and remains to some extent influenced by engineering, distribution and manufacturing, holding for instance the headquarters and production site of Thorntons confectionery.

The House of Commons constituency of Amber Valley is of smaller scope.

The village of Crich and other parts of the district were the setting for ITV drama series Peak Practice (1993–2002).

== History ==
The district was formed on 1 April 1974 under the Local Government Act 1972 as one of nine districts within Derbyshire. The new district covered the area of five former districts, which were all abolished at the same time:

- Alfreton Urban District
- Belper Rural District
- Belper Urban District
- Heanor Urban District
- Ripley Urban District

The new district was named Amber Valley, after the River Amber. Amber Valley was granted borough status in 1989, allowing the chair of the council to take the title of mayor.

Under current local government restructuring plans it is planned that the district will be abolished in 2028. Its area will be split between two new unitary authorities, one for Derbyshire North and another for Derbyshire South, including Derby.

== Governance ==
Amber Valley Borough Council

Type
- Type: Non-metropolitan district council

Leadership
- Mayor: Tony Holmes, Labour since 13 May 2026
- Leader: Chris Emmas-Williams, Labour since 24 May 2023
- Chief Executive: Simon Gladwin since December 2023

Structure
- Seats: 42 councillors
- Graph of the party split among 42 seats.
- Political groups: Administration (19) Labour (19) Other parties (23) Conservative (7) Green (6) Reform (3) Derbyshire Community Party (2) Liberal Democrats (1) Independent (4)

Elections
- Last election: 4 May 2023
- Next election: 6 May 2027

Meeting place
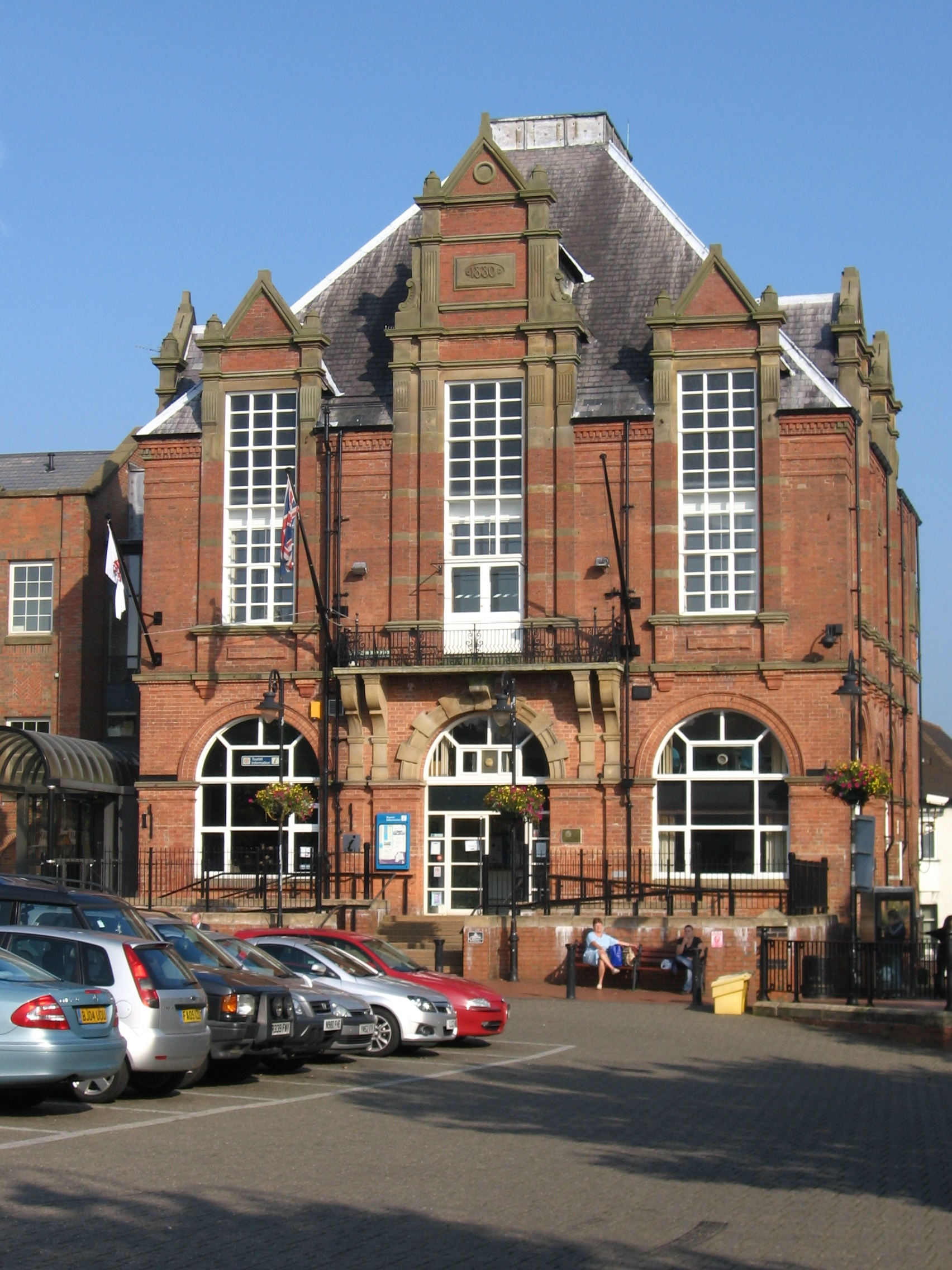
- Town Hall, Market Place, Ripley, DE5 3BT

Website
- ambervalley.gov.uk

Amber Valley Borough Council provides district-level services. County-level services are provided by Derbyshire County Council. Most of the district is also covered by civil parishes, which form a third tier of local government.

=== Political control ===
Labour won a majority on the council at the 2023 election, taking control from the Conservatives. Following a number of by-elections and changes of allegiance, the party lost its majority in December 2025, since when the council has been under no overall control. Labour remains the largest party on the council and runs it as a minority administration.

The first election to the council was held in 1973, initially operating as a shadow authority alongside the outgoing authorities until the new arrangements came into effect on 1 April 1974. Political control of the council since 1974 has been as follows:

Party in control	Years
Labour	1974–1976
No overall control	1976–1980
Labour	1980–1987
No overall control	1987–1988
Conservative	1988–1991
Labour	1991–2000
Conservative	2000–2014
Labour	2014–2015
Conservative	2015–2019
Labour	2019–2021
Conservative	2021–2023
Labour	2023–2025
No overall control	2025–present

=== Leadership ===
The role of mayor is largely ceremonial in Amber Valley. Political leadership is instead provided by the leader of the council. The leaders since 2002 have been:

Councillor	Party	From	To
Alan Cox	Conservative	May 2002	17 Dec 2007
Stuart Bradford	Conservative	17 Dec 2007	11 Jun 2014
Paul Jones	Labour	11 Jun 2014	May 2015
Alan Cox	Conservative	20 May 2015	May 2016
Kevin Buttery	Conservative	25 May 2016	May 2019
Chris Emmas-Williams	Labour	22 May 2019	May 2021
Kevin Buttery	Conservative	19 May 2021	May 2023
Chris Emmas-Williams	Labour	24 May 2023	

=== Composition ===
Following the 2023 election, and subsequent changes of allegiance and by-elections up to October 2026, the composition of the council was:

Party	Seats
Labour	19
Conservative	7
Green	6
Reform	3
Derbyshire Community Party	2
Liberal Democrats	1
Independent	4
Total	42

Two of the independent councillors sit together as the "Amber Valley Independents" group. The next election is due in 2027.

=== Premises ===
The council is based at Ripley Town Hall, which had been built in 1881 as a market hall and converted to a town hall for the former Ripley Urban District Council in 1907. A modern extension to the west of the building was added in the 1990s.

== Elections ==
Since the last boundary changes in 2023 the council has comprised 42 councillors elected from 18 wards, with each ward electing two or three councillors. Elections are held every four years.

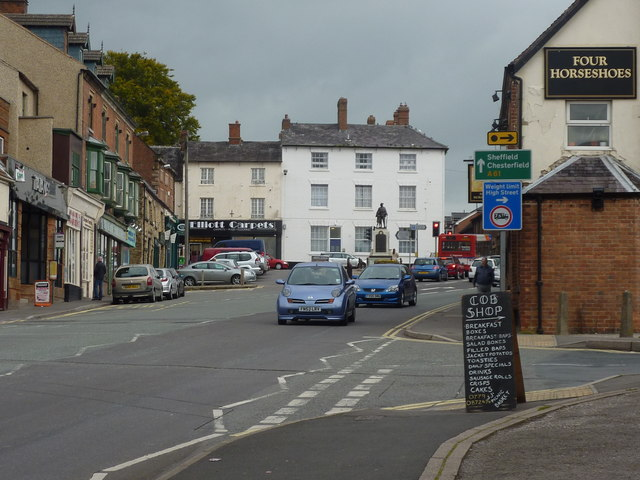
Alfreton, the largest settlement in the Amber Valley district, 2010

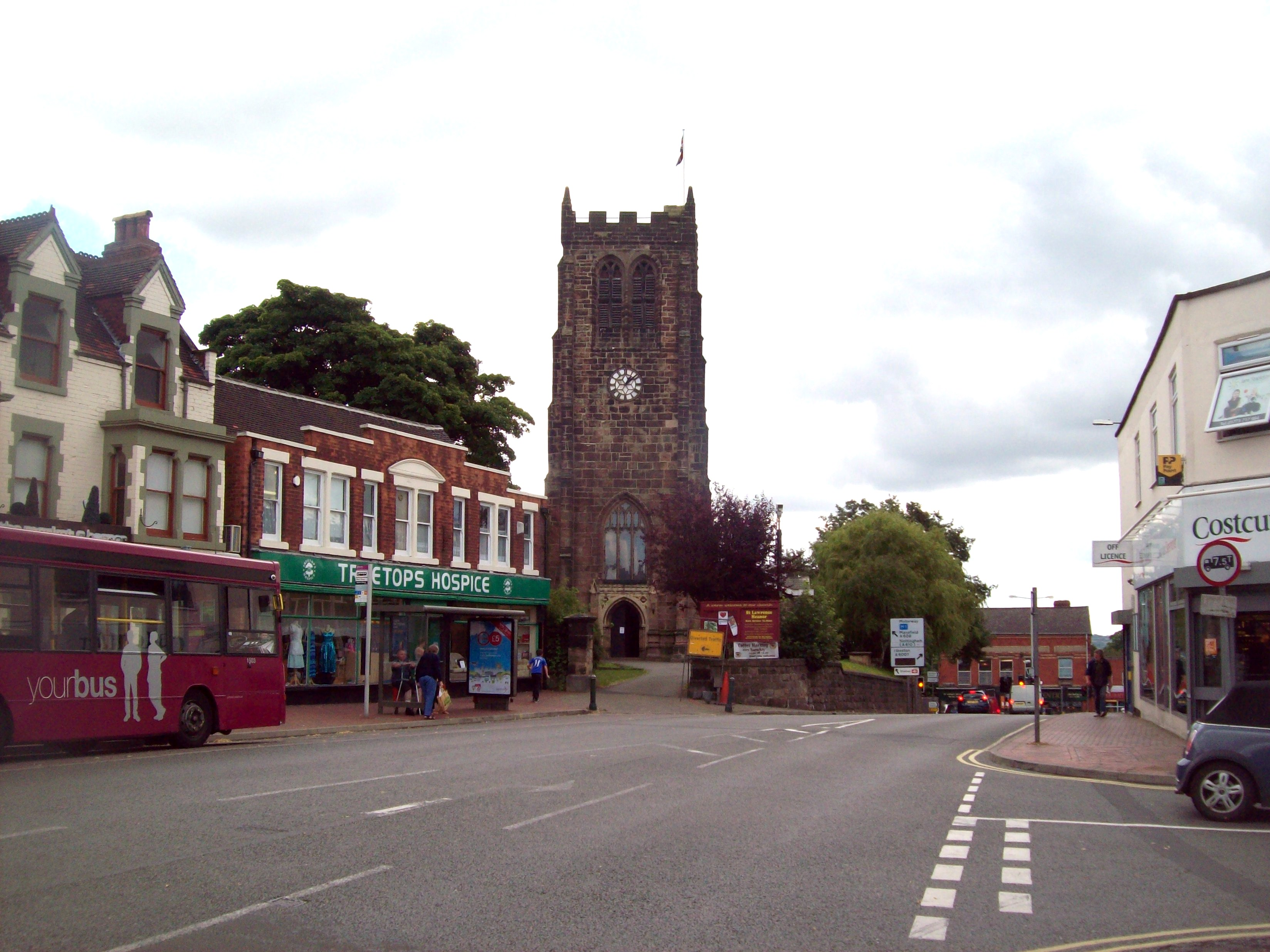
Heanor, the third-largest settlement in Amber Valley, 2012

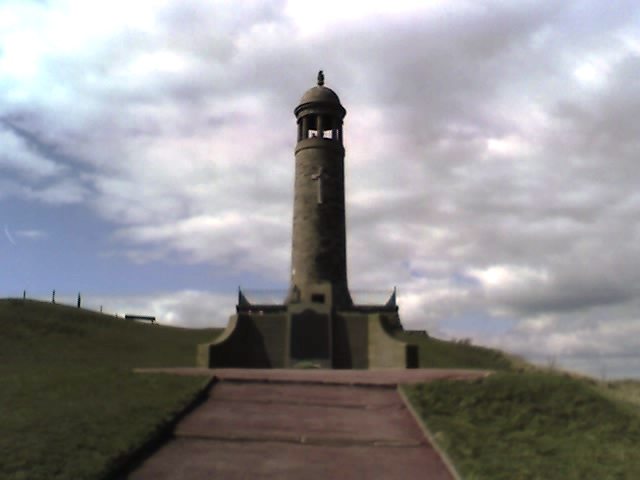
Crich Stand in 2007

== Towns of Amber Valley ==
- Alfreton
- Belper
- Heanor
- Ripley

== Main villages of Amber Valley ==
- Ambergate
- Codnor
- Crich
- Denby
- Duffield
- Heage
- Holbrook
- Horsley
- Horsley Woodhouse
- Kedleston
- Kilburn
- Langley Mill
- Dethick, Lea and Holloway
- Mackworth
- Milford
- Quarndon
- Riddings
- Smalley
- Somercotes
- Swanwick
- Whatstandwell

== Parishes ==
Map of Amber Valley district

There are 35 civil parishes in the borough, covering almost the whole area. The exception is Riddings, which is an unparished area, being the only part of the former Alfreton Urban District not to have been subsequently added to a parish.

- Aldercar and Langley Mill
- Alderwasley
- Alfreton
- Ashleyhay
- Belper
- Codnor
- Crich
- Denby
- Dethick, Lea and Holloway
- Duffield
- Hazelwood
- Heanor and Loscoe
- Holbrook
- Horsley
- Horsley Woodhouse
- Idridgehay and Alton
- Ironville
- Kedleston
- Kilburn
- Kirk Langley
- Mackworth
- Mapperley
- Pentrich
- Quarndon
- Ravensdale Park
- Ripley
- Shipley
- Shottle and Postern
- Smalley
- Somercotes
- South Wingfield
- Swanwick
- Turnditch
- Weston Underwood
- Windley

== Arms ==
Coat of arms of Amber Valley

Notes
Granted 18 October 1989
Crest
On a wreath of the colours the battlements of a tower Proper issuant therefrom between two abbatical crosiers Or an oak tree Proper fructed and ensigned by a crown of fleurs-de-lys Gold.
Escutcheon
Vert a pale wavy Or a bordure Argent charged with five horseshoes Sable on a chief of the second between two lozenges a cresset Sable fired Proper.
Supporters
On the dexter side a unicorn Argent armed and crined Or gorged with a collar pendent therefrom a cross flory Gules and on the sinister side a leopard Proper gorged with a collar Gules pendent therefrom a fleur-de-lys Or.
Motto
Per Laborem Progedimur (We Make Progress Through Hard Work)

== Media ==
In terms of television, the Amber Valley is served by BBC East Midlands and ITV Central broadcasting from the Waltham transmitter.

Radio stations that broadcast to the area are:

- BBC Radio Derby
- Smooth East Midlands
- Capital Midlands
- Greatest Hits Radio Midlands
- Greatest Hits Radio Yorkshire (formerly Peak FM)
- Amber Sound FM, a community station that broadcasts from its studios in Ripley.

The local newspapers are the Ripley & Heanor News, Belper News and Derbyshire Times.

== See also ==
- List of places in Derbyshire
