= Belper Rural District =

Former district in Derbyshire, England

Belper
- Belper Rural District shown within Derbyshire in 1970.
- Area
  - 1911: 50,357 acres (203.79 km^{2})
  - 1961: 48,074 acres (194.55 km^{2})
- Population
  - 1911: 23,586
  - 1961: 33,362
- History
  - Created: 1894
  - Abolished: 1974
  - Succeeded by: Amber Valley
- Status: Rural district
- Government: Belper Rural District Council

Belper was a rural district in Derbyshire, England from 1894 to 1974. It was created under the Local Government Act 1894.

The district was abolished in 1974 under the Local Government Act 1972 and combined with various other local government districts in eastern and central Derbyshire to form the new Amber Valley district.
