= Shirley Abbott =

Shirley Abbott may refer to:

- Shirley Abbott (ambassador) (1924–2013), American diplomat
- Shirley Abbott (author) (1934–2019), American writer and magazine editor
- Shirley Abbott (footballer) (1889–1947), English footballer
