= Alfreton War Memorial =

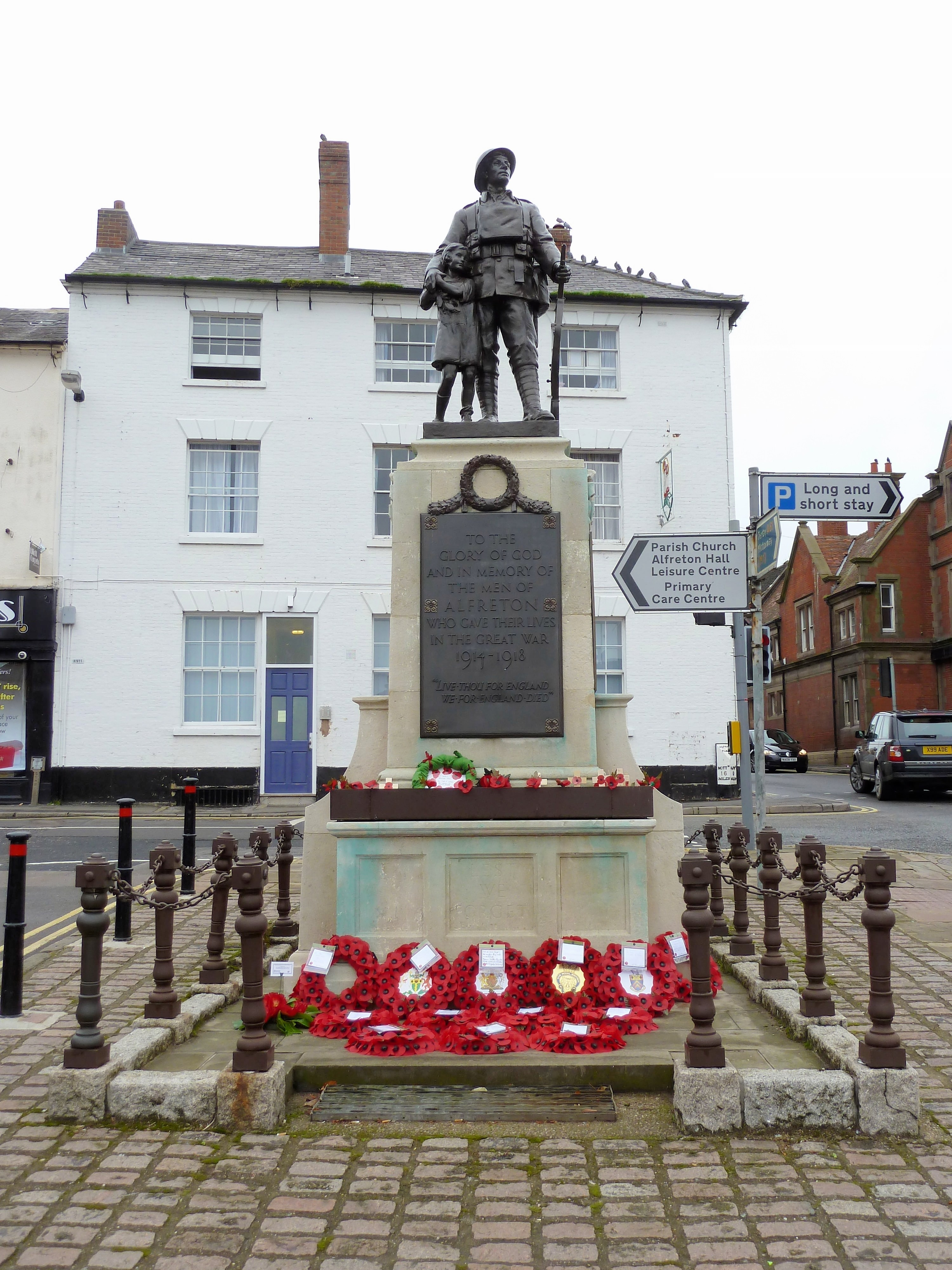
- The war memorial in 2010

- Location in Derbyshire
- 53°05′51″N 1°23′25″W
- Location: Alfreton, Amber Valley, Derbyshire, England

Listed Building – Grade II
- Official name: War Memorial
- Designated: 25 May 1988
- Reference no.: 1109034

Alfreton War Memorial is a 20th century Grade II listed war memorial in the town and civil parish of Alfreton, in the Amber Valley district of Derbyshire, England.

== History ==
The war memorial was unveiled on 31 July 1927, with General Sir Horace Smith-Dorrien in attendance, three years before his passing.

The memorial and the surrounding railings have been Grade II listed since 25 May 1988.

== Description ==
The memorial consists of a bronze statue of a First World War soldier in battle dress protecting a child standing against him. The statue is mounted on a plinth on which there are bronze plaques bearing the dedicatory inscription and list of names of the fallen.

== See also ==
- Listed buildings in Alfreton
