= Ellen Morewood =

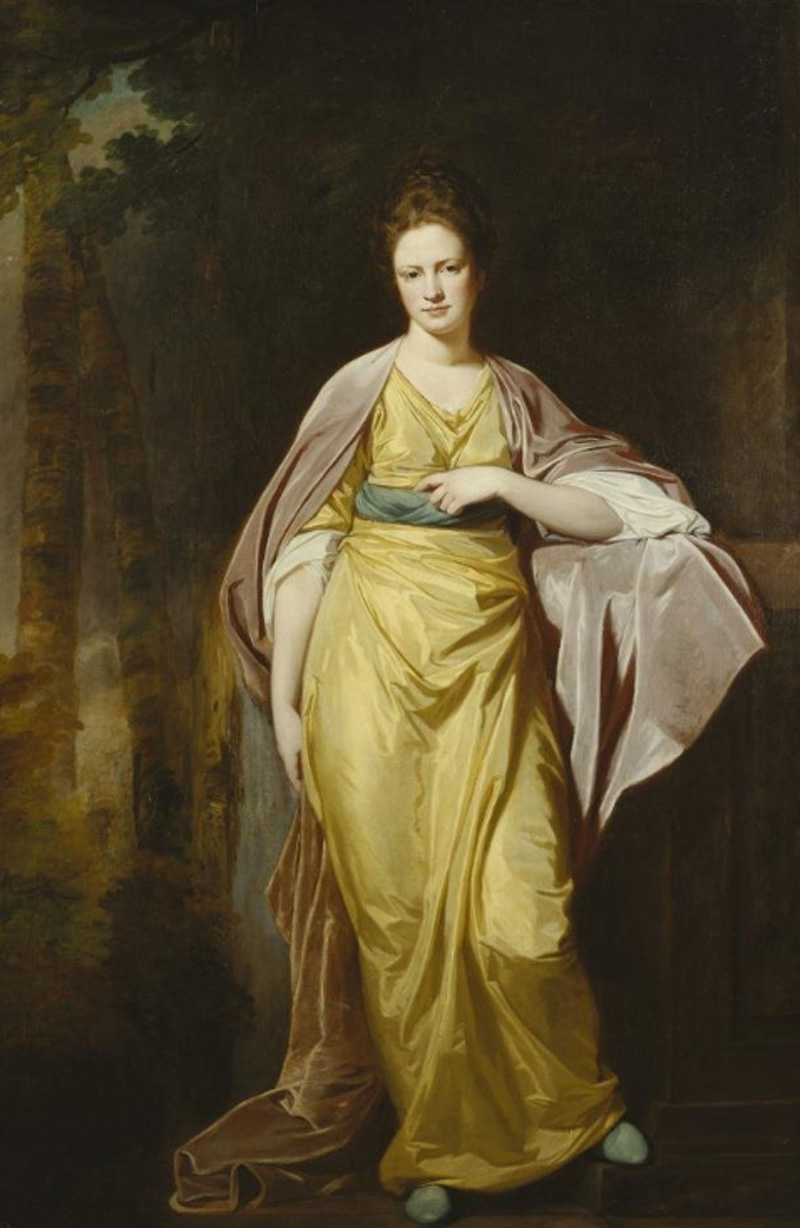
- by George Romney
- Born: Ellen Goodwin; 1740
- Died: 1824 (aged 83–84)
- Other names: Mrs. Henry Case-Morewood
- Occupation: landowner
- Known for: mine owner who lost legal case
- Spouse: Richard Goodwin
- Children: one

Ellen Morewood or Ellen Goodwin; Ellen Goodwyn; Mrs. George Morewood; Mrs. Henry Case-Morewood (1740 – 1824) was an English colliery owner based at Alfreton Hall in Derbyshire. She unsuccessfully defended her right to mine under land adjacent to hers and she carried forward the Morewood name.

== Life ==
Ellen was baptised on New Years Day 1741. Her father, Richard Goodwin, was an attorney based at Mapleton in Derbyshire.

When she was 27 years old she married the 49 year old George Morewood who lived at Alfreton Hall in Derbyshire on 27 February 1768. They had one child in 1769, Rowland, who died soon after birth. They were both painted by the artist George Romney again 1769. These paintings hung in the dining room of Alfreton Hall.

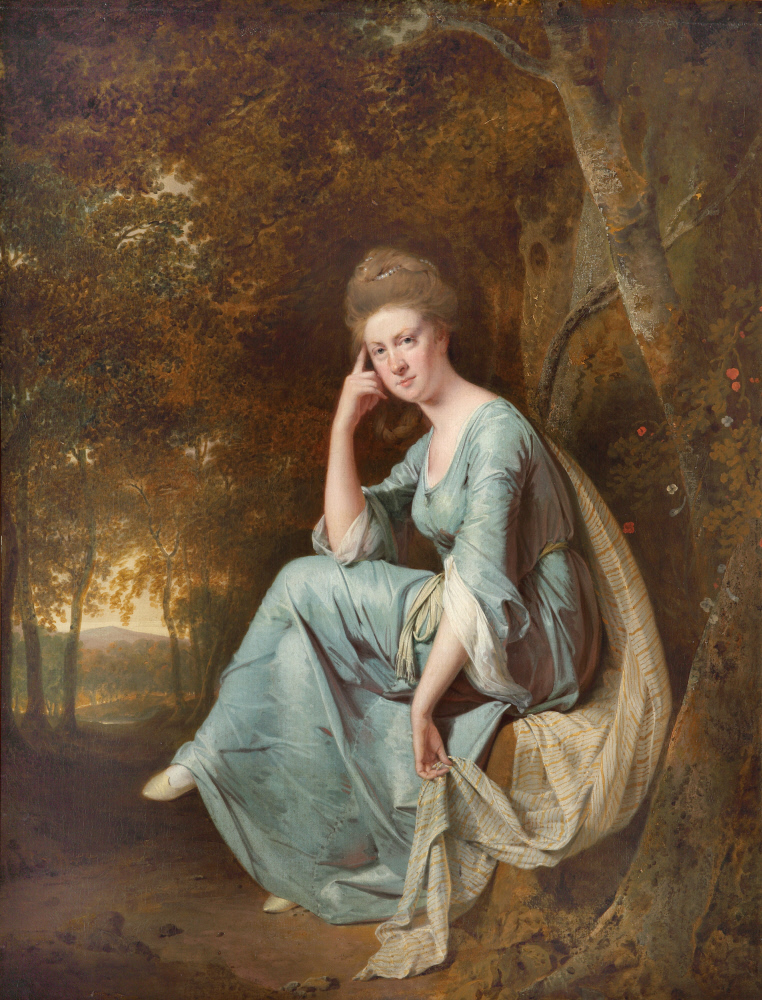
Ellen Morewood

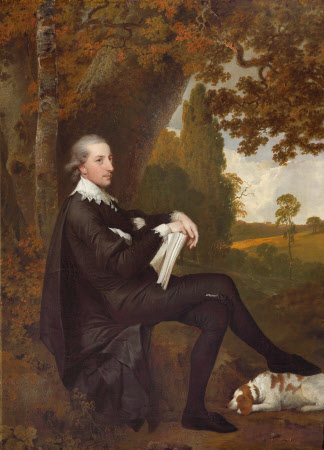
The Reverend Henry Case

In 1782 she had another portrait painted, this time by Joseph Wright of Derby. That same year Joseph Wright also painted a portrait of the Reverend Henry Case. He would, in time, be her second husband, but she did not become a widow for another ten years.

In 1792 George died and left Alfreton Hall and other his estates to Ellen. She owned a brickworks, a colliery, farms and ironstone sources. Over the next nine years she was engaged in a legal battle with her neighbours the Outrams. Land had been sold to them but Ellen believed that she had the rights to the coal and ironstone beneath them. James and Benjamin Outram disagreed and they appealed and in 1803 the Lord Chief Justice of the King's Bench, Lord Ellenborough agreed with them.

Ellen later married Reverend Henry Case who took the name Morewood. They both lived at Alfreton Hall for the next 30 years. An interesting description is given of the house in 1812 at the time they were in residence:

== Death and legacy ==
Ellen died in 1824 and Henry died a year later. As they had no heirs the property was left to Ellen's nephew William Palmer of Ladbroke Hall. He took the name Morewood and became William Palmer-Morewood.

In 1841 a man presented himself as John William Morewood saying that he had been stolen from his mother (Ellen) when a child and had returned from sea to gain his inheritance. He was thrown out of the town.
