= Slimming World =

Weight loss products and services company

- Company type: Private
- Founded: 1969
- Founder: Margaret Miles-Bramwell
- Headquarters: Alfreton, Derbyshire; England
- Key people: Margaret Miles-Bramwell (Founder, Chairperson until 2025); David Rathbone
- Products: Weight loss
- Number of employees: 400 (head office/field management), 3,500 (consultants)
- Website: slimmingworld.co.uk

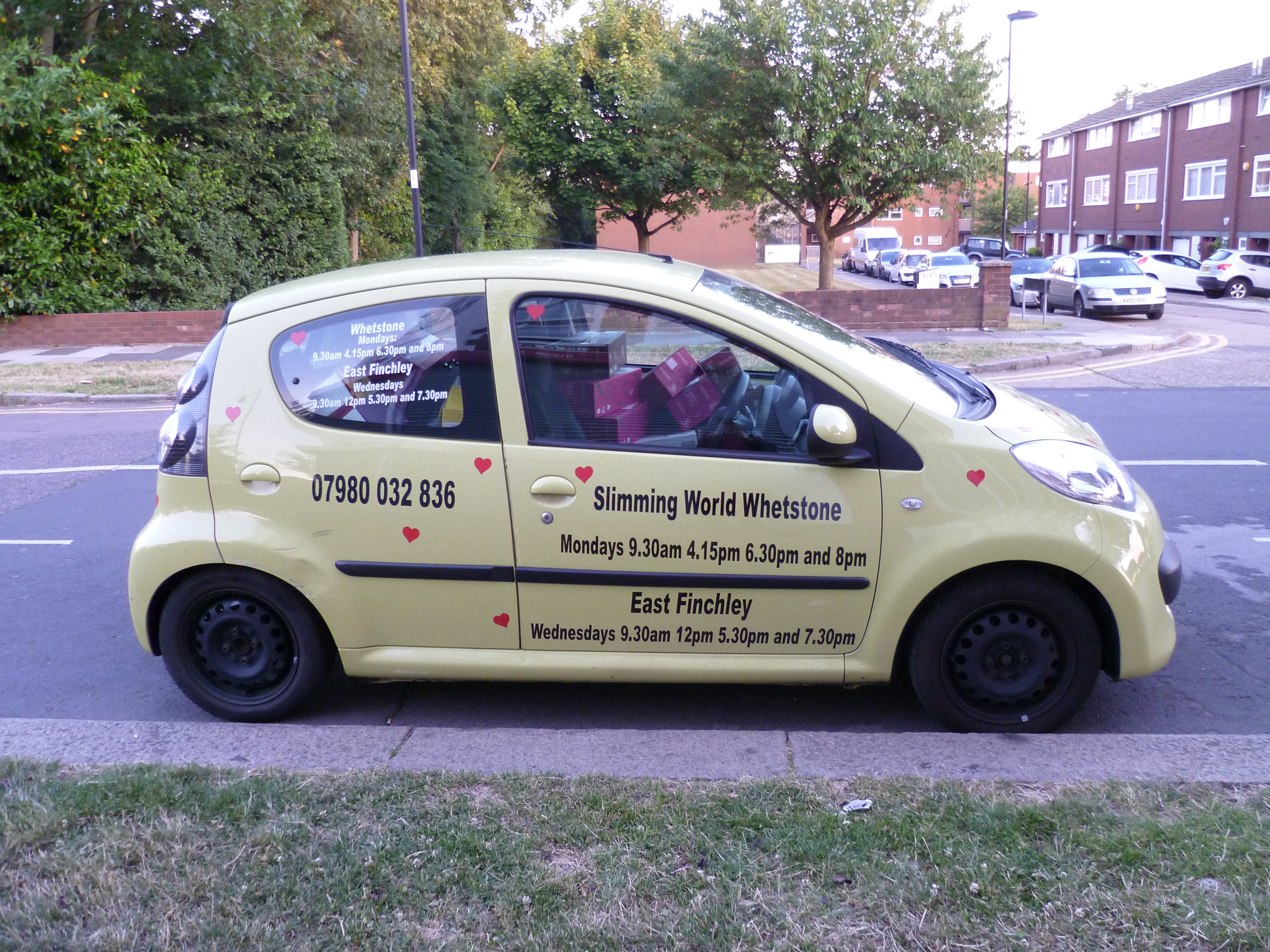
A Slimming World branded car in London

Slimming World is an English weight loss organisation. It was founded in Derbyshire in 1969 by Margaret Miles-Bramwell, who remained its chairperson until her death on 2 February 2025.

Its focus is predominantly weight loss although it supports members to maintain a healthy weight. It operates through a network of 3,500 consultants.

Slimming World offers an eating plan based on food satiety and energy density as well as a group support service called IMAGE Therapy.

== Company history ==
Previous logo, 2007–2009

The company began in 1969 with a handful of groups in Derbyshire before expanding into Yorkshire.

Slimming World launched its charity SMILES (Slimmers Making It a Little Easier for Someone) in 1997.

Slimming World publishes recipe books and directories for group members and launched Slimming World magazine in 1998.

In 2001, the company launched a referral scheme in which GPs could prescribe 12 weeks' attendance to patients wishing to lose weight. In 2011, an academic paper showed patients attending at least ten sessions achieved a loss of 5% of their body weight.

== Diet ==
In its 2014 guidance, the National Institute for Health and Care Excellence lists Slimming World alongside the Rosemary Conley and Weight Watchers programmes as being "effective at 12 to 18 months".

Slimming World encourages members to introduce physical activity into their everyday routines. It introduces this gently with activities such as walking up stairs instead of taking the lift. Members get bronze, silver, gold and platinum awards as their activity levels increase, achieving platinum when they routinely exercise or undertake 30 minutes' activity five times weekly.

Slimming World works in partnership with the Royal College of Midwives and is the first national slimming organisation to support pregnant women and breastfeeding mothers to manage their weight healthily during pregnancy. Its policy was written in collaboration with the college and mothers take part with the consent of their midwife.

== See also ==
- Dieting
- List of diets
