= Norman Whitehead =

English painter

Norman Whitehead (1915–1983) was a landscape painter, working chiefly around his hometown Alfreton, Derbyshire. Active mainly in the 1930s he was greatly influenced by the works of Paul Nash and the Vorticism movement, experimenting with form and developing a style which was very much his own.

== Biography ==
Whitehead was encouraged in art by teachers at school, and at the age of 15 joined Alfreton Art Club. However, on leaving school he joined the family haulage business, becoming a driver for the firm, which widened his horizons as he drove around the countryside. He also became the firm's bookkeeper, but lacking training for the task, he made errors, leading to an investigation in 1935 by the Inland Revenue. His mother blamed him, and banished him to the coal-house, where he lived for years.

In the meantime he had started to paint, and through this began to mix with socially liberal people, through whom he became aware of the growing pacifist movement, to which he was attracted. In 1938 Whitehead visited London for the first time, to attend a Peace Pledge Union (PPU) rally at Friends' House, Euston Road. The following year he went to London again, to seek advice from the PPU about registering as a conscientious objector in the likely event of war. While there, he met Mrs Jan Gordon, art critic of The Observer, who illustrated her article in the newspaper with his paintings, describing his work as 'touched by genius'.

Whitehead's pacifism was now confirmed, and in World War II he was registered by the Local Tribunal as a conscientious objector, conditional upon driving an ambulance in Derbyshire. He later regretted his decision not to "stand up to Fascism". This perceived lack of action and the rift with his mother, during which a number of his paintings were destroyed, conspired to frustrate his ambition to become a professional artist and perhaps prevented his being recognised in British Modernist art. After 1947 he never painted again.

The majority of Whitehead's paintings were stored in the loft of the family home until shortly before his death, when he attempted to catalogue them. In 1998 his widow donated his work (1933–1939), a few hundred paintings, to local museums.

Norman Whitehead's paintings are now on permanent display in a dedicated gallery of the Ilkeston Erewash Museum.
