= Sammy Lamb =

English footballer

Personal information
- Full name: Sam Lamb
- Date of birth: 27 November 1885
- Place of birth: Alfreton, England
- Date of death: 1960 (aged 74–75)
- Position: Winger

Senior career*
Years	Team	Apps	(Gls)
1904–1905	Alfreton Town		
1905–1907	Derby County	30	(1)
1907	Alfreton Town		
1907–1908	Sutton Town		
1909–1910	Plymouth Argyle	30	(5)
1910–1913	Swindon Town	79	(13)
1913	Millwall Athletic		
1919–1920	Rotherham County	35	(2)
1920–1923	Caerphilly		
1923	Penrhiwceiber		
Total		174	(21)
- * Club domestic league appearances and goals

Sam Lamb (5 July 1879–1960) was an English footballer who played in the Football League for Derby County and Rotherham County.
