= Listed buildings in Alfreton =

Alfreton is a civil parish and a town in the Amber Valley district of Derbyshire, England. The parish contains 18 listed buildings that are recorded in the National Heritage List for England. Of these, one is listed at Grade II*, the middle of the three grades, and the others are at Grade II, the lowest grade. The listed buildings include two churches, a chest tomb and a sundial in a churchyard, houses and associated structures, a former village lock-up, a hotel, a milepost, a school and a war memorial.

== Key ==
Grade	Criteria
II*	Particularly important buildings of more than special interest
II	Buildings of national importance and special interest

== Buildings ==
Name and location	Photograph	Date	Notes	Grade
St Martin's Church; 53.09868°N 1.39320°W		13th century	The church has been altered and extended through the centuries, including an extension in 1868–69, and an enlargement of the chancel in 1899–1901 by C. Hodgson Fowler. The church is built in stone with roofs of lead, tile and slate, and consists of a nave with a clerestory, north and south aisles, a south porch, a chancel with a north vestry, a later north hall, and a west tower. The tower has three stages, diagonal stepped buttresses, string courses, a west doorway with a pointed arch, a three-light west window, a clock face on the south, two-light bell openings, and an embattled parapet with central gargoyles and corner crocketed pinnacles.	II*
Alfreton House; 53.09779°N 1.38503°W		Mid 17th century	A house later extended and used for other purposes, it is in stone, with quoins, extensions in red brick, and a tile roof with stone copings. There are two storeys and attics, a front of five bays, and extensions to the north. On the front is a projecting three-storey porch containing a doorway with a quoined chamfered surround, above which are two two-light mullioned windows with hood moulds. Most of the other windows are 20th-century replacements, and in the upper floor is a sundial.	II
Barn adjoining 16 Church Street; 53.09795°N 1.39109°W	—	Early 18th century	The barn is in red brick on a stone plinth, with stone dressings and a tile roof. There are two storeys and four bays. In the centre is an opening with a quoined surround, there are two doorways with quoined and chamfered surrounds, and other openings including a mullioned window, and two hayloft openings.	II
17 Church Street; 53.09775°N 1.39085°W		Early 18th century	A house, later offices, in red brick on a plinth, with stone dressings, quoins, and a slate roof with stone copings on moulded kneelers. There are three storeys and three bays. The central doorway has a moulded surround, and the windows are sashes, those in the outer bays of the ground floor are tripartite.	II
2 King Street; 53.09762°N 1.39075°W	—	Early 18th century	A house, later offices, on a corner site, in red brick on a plinth, with stone dressings, rusticated quoins, and a tile roof, hipped on the corner, and with coped gables and moulded kneelers, on the south and west. There are three storeys and an L-shaped plan, with fronts of three and five bays. In each front is a shop window, and a doorway with pilasters, a plain lintel, and a hood mould. The windows in the lower two floors are mullioned and transomed, and those in the top floor are smaller and mullioned.	II
1 Raglan Street; 53.09698°N 1.38268°W	—	Early 18th century	A house in red brick with dressings in brick and painted stone, quoins, and a slate roof with shaped kneelers. There are two storeys and two bays. The doorway has a chamfered edge, a large lintel, jambs, and impost blocks, and the windows are horizontally-sliding sashes in cambered arches.	II
Chest tomb 53.09870°N 1.39295°W	—	Mid 18th century	The chest tomb is in the churchyard of St Martin's Church, to the north of the chancel. It is in gritstone with a rectangular plan, and is about 3 feet (0.91 m) high. The sides have raised and fielded panels, the top slab has a moulded edge, and there are inscriptions on the north and south sides.	II
Sundial; 53.09850°N 1.39303°W		18th century	The sundial is in the churchyard of St Martin's Church, southeast of the porch. It is in stone, and consists of a square three-stepped plinth, on which is a plain column with a cornice and a copper dial.	II
House of Confinement; 53.09424°N 1.39181°W		1820	A village lock-up in stone with a roof of stone slabs. There is a single storey and two bays. The front facing the street is gabled, and contains a semicircular-headed doorway with a keystone. Above it is an inscribed plaque flanked by circular openings.	II
12 Church Street; 53.09806°N 1.39215°W		Early 19th century	Originally a lodge to Alfreton Hall, the house is in painted red brick with stone dressings and a hipped slate roof. There are two storeys and two bays. In the centre is a doorway, and the windows are casements. Over the ground floor is a continuous band that forms a semicircular arch over each opening.	II
Former stable block, Alfreton Hall; 53.09806°N 1.39386°W		Early 19th century	The former stable block and coach house are in stone, with a string course, a moulded eaves cornice, and a hipped slate roof. There are two storeys, a U-shaped plan, a three-bay central block, and flanking L-shaped single-storey wings. In the central block are three segmental-headed arches with tooled voussoirs and impost bands, and above are three two-light casement windows. The west wing contains five semicircular arches, and the east wing has seven bays.	II
Pigeoncote, Alfreton Hall; 53.09797°N 1.39301°W	—	Early 19th century	The pigeoncote is in red brick on a plinth, with brick dressings, a dentilled eaves band, and a pyramidal slate roof with a ball finial. There are two storeys, a square plan, and a single bay. On the east and west sides are tall segmental arches, and above are round-headed openings in the west and south sides.	II
George Hotel; 53.09772°N 1.39040°W		Early 19th century	The hotel, on a corner site, is in painted red brick with stucco dressings, a stepped eaves band, and a slate roof, hipped to the southeast. There are three storeys, fronts of three bays, and a later two-storey three-bay wing to the north. The doorway has a stepped semicircular head and a traceried fanlight. The windows are sashes.	II
Milepost; 53.09769°N 1.39031°W		Early 19th century	The milepost abuts the George Hotel and is in cast iron. It has a triangular section and a sloping top. The top is inscribed "ALFRETON PARISH" and in the sides it is indicated that Nottingham is 16 miles distant, and Alfreton is 0 miles away (the names have been abbreviated).	II
Wycliffe Reform Church; 53.09764°N 1.39110°W		c. 1850	The church is in sandstone with a roof of blue and green slate and crested ridge tiles. It consists of a nave, a chancel, and aisles. The gabled end faces the street, and contains three round semicircular-headed windows and a two-light window above. To the right is a tower with four stages, containing a round-headed doorway, above which is a recessed panel containing a circular window and with a frieze at the top. The third stage has paired semicircular-headed windows, and the top stage contains an arcade on each side, and a corbel table under a cornice. On the left is a square turret that has a cupola with arcaded sides and a pyramidal roof.	II
Alfreton Hall; 53.09753°N 1.39489°W		1853–54	The remaining east wing of a country house that was extended in 1892, the rest of the house being demolished in 1968. It is in stone on a moulded plinth, with rusticated full-height pilasters, a moulded eaves cornice, a balustrade with square piers and vase-shaped balusters, a pedimented panel, and a hipped slate roof. There are two storeys and eleven bays, the left two bays and the right bay recessed. On the front is a three-bay loggia with three moulded and rusticated round-headed arches on impost blocks, four Tuscan columns, a triglyph frieze, and a moulded cornice. The windows are sashes with moulded architraves, the window over the middle of the loggia also with a pulvinated frieze and a pediment. Above the doorway is a pedimented panel.	II
Croft Infant School; 53.09492°N 1.38753°W	—	1907–08	The school, designed by George H. Widdows, is in red brick, partly pebbledashed, with brick and tile dressings, and a tile roof. There is an X-shaped plan, consisting of a central three-bay hall, and four four-bay classrooms radiating from it. On top of the hall is an octagonal cupola with loured arcaded sides, and a domed top with a weathervane. The windows are mullioned and transomed, and in the gables are mullioned dormers.	II
War memorial and railings 53.09754°N 1.39040°W		1927	The war memorial in Market Place is in stone, and has a moulded plinth, a panelled base, and a tall square pier on which is a bronze statue depicting a soldier and a child. On three sides of the piers are inscribed bronze plaques. The memorial is enclosed by a kerb, on which are bulbous posts linked by chains.	II
