= Alfreton Hall =

Country house in Alfreton, Derbyshire, England

Coordinates: 53°5′52″N 1°23′31″W

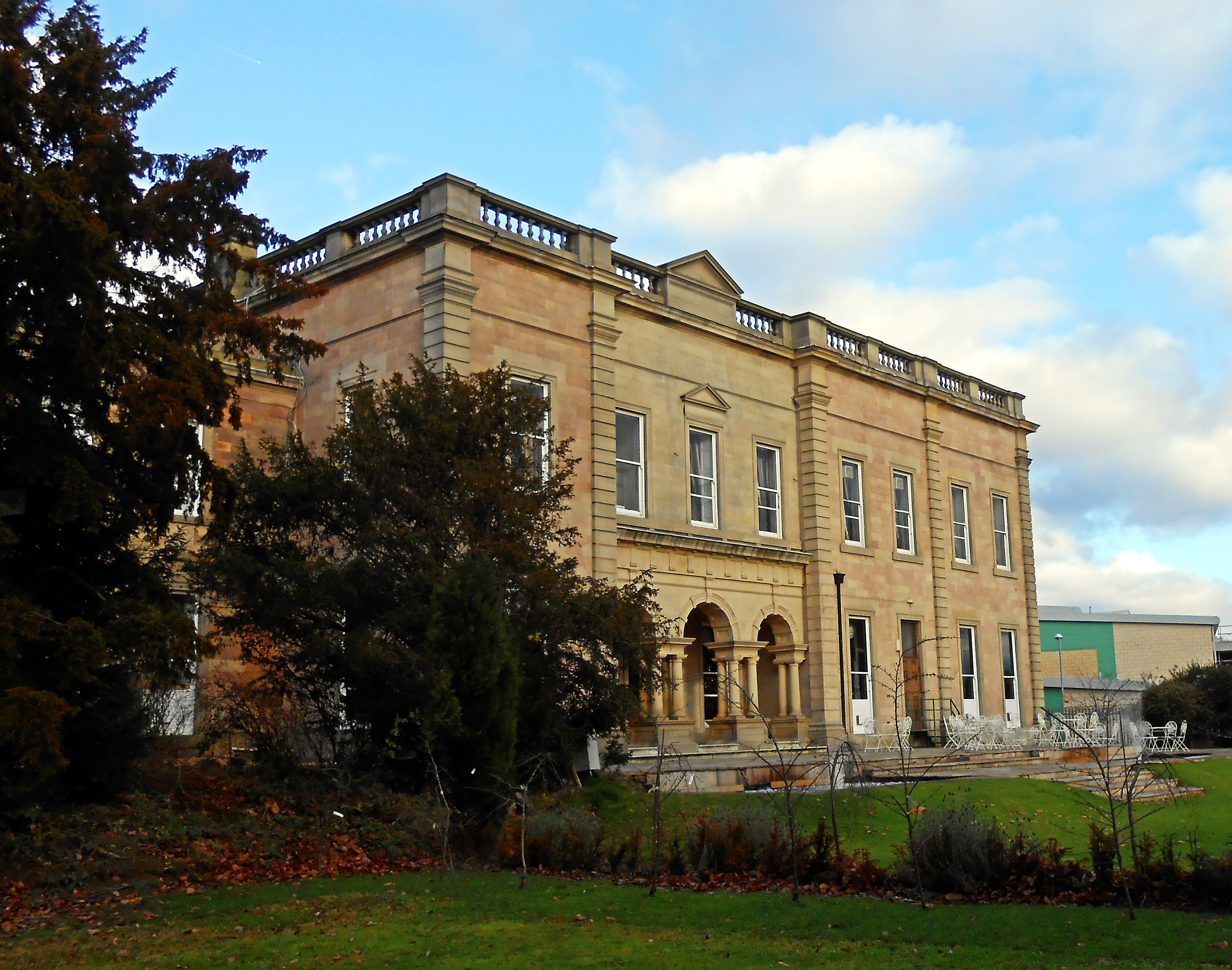
- Interactive map of the Alfreton Hall area

General information
- Construction started: 1724
- Completed: 1725

Listed Building – Grade II
- Official name: Alfreton Hall
- Designated: 25 May 1988
- Reference no.: 1109028

Alfreton Hall is a country house in Alfreton, Derbyshire. It was at the heart of local social and industrial history in the county. The history of the estate goes back to Norman times, but by the 17th century it was owned by the Morewood family, who were linked to local industry, mainly in coal mining.

The original hall was on the site of Hall Farm to the east of the present building and was the seat of the Lord of the Manor. A new hall was built on the estate around 1724–25 by Rowland Morewood, with an additional wing added in 1855 by William Palmer-Morewood (architect Benjamin Wilson). This made the hall a very substantial property.

== The Morewood family ==
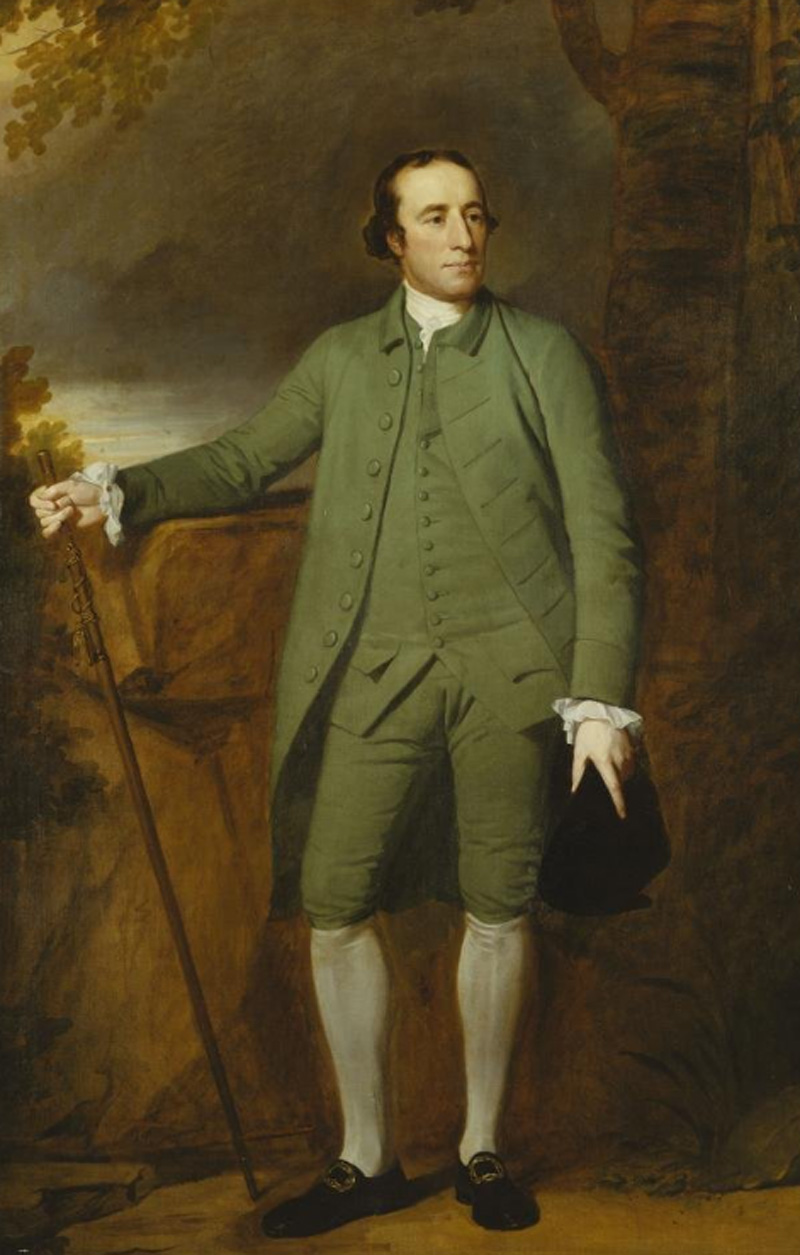
George Morewood (one of a pair by Romney)

Rowland Morewood built Alfreton Hall in about 1725. He was born in 1682. His father was John Morewood who owned the Alfreton estate and his mother was Barbara Palmer. He was educated at Cambridge University in 1700 and in 1717 he married Mary Wigley. He was the High Sheriff of Derby in 1706–1707. The couple had three sons but two died leaving the second son George to inherit Alfreton Hall.

George Morewood was born in 1719. In 1768 at the age of 49 he married Ellen Goodwin who was the daughter of Richard Goodwin of Ashbourne. She was 27 years old. Paintings of this couple by George Romney once hung in the Hall's dining room.

In 1792 George died and left the estate to his wife Ellen who carried forward the Morewood name and went to court to defend, unsuccessfully, her mining rights. She later married Reverend Henry Case who took the name Morewood. They both lived at Alfreton Hall for the next 30 years. An interesting description is given of the house in 1812 at the time they were in residence:

"The present mansion house does considerable credit to the taste and liberality of its erector, Rowland Morewood, Esq., who, about 80 years ago, caused the old building, which was falling into decay, to be pulled down, and built, at a little distance to the west, the present stone house. It commands a pleasing prospect from the north and west fronts. The adjoining grounds, according to their extent, are well laid out and the rooms within are furnished with a considerable collection of paintings, some of them by the best masters. Beneath the house is a piece of woodland, the upper part of which is intersected by two avenues; one of them which branches off to the other on the right is terminated by a Temple of Diana, and a bust, and the other of them by an obelisk, above and below by a piece of water, the boundaries of which, not being seen from the farthest point of view, the imagination is left to form to itself the idea of unlimited expansion and transform a little fish pond into an extensive lake. Below are several rural moss huts and a grotto built of different mineral productions of all that diversity of form and colour exhibited by the mineral substances of the Peak. It is of an octagonal figure and painted within are several representations of scenes in Walton's "Angler"."

Ellen died in 1824 and Henry died a year later. As they had no heirs the property was left to Ellen’s nephew William Palmer of Ladbroke Hall. He took the name Morewood and became William Palmer-Morewood.

== The Palmer-Morewood family ==
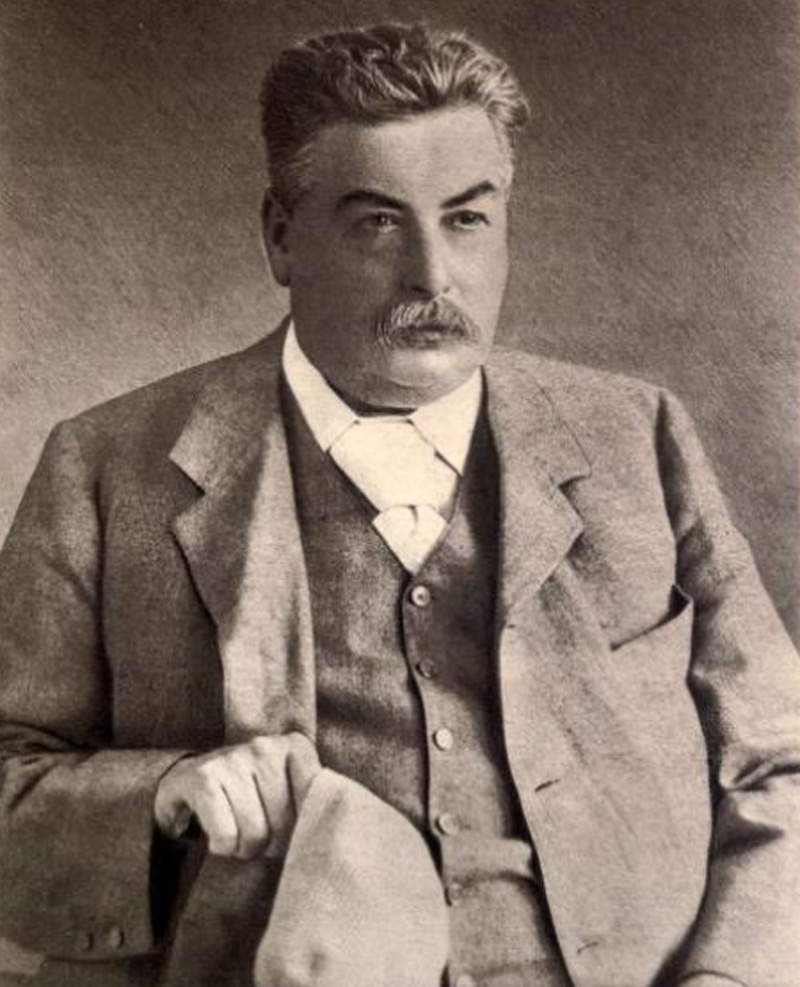
Charles Rowland Palmer-Morewood (1843–1910)

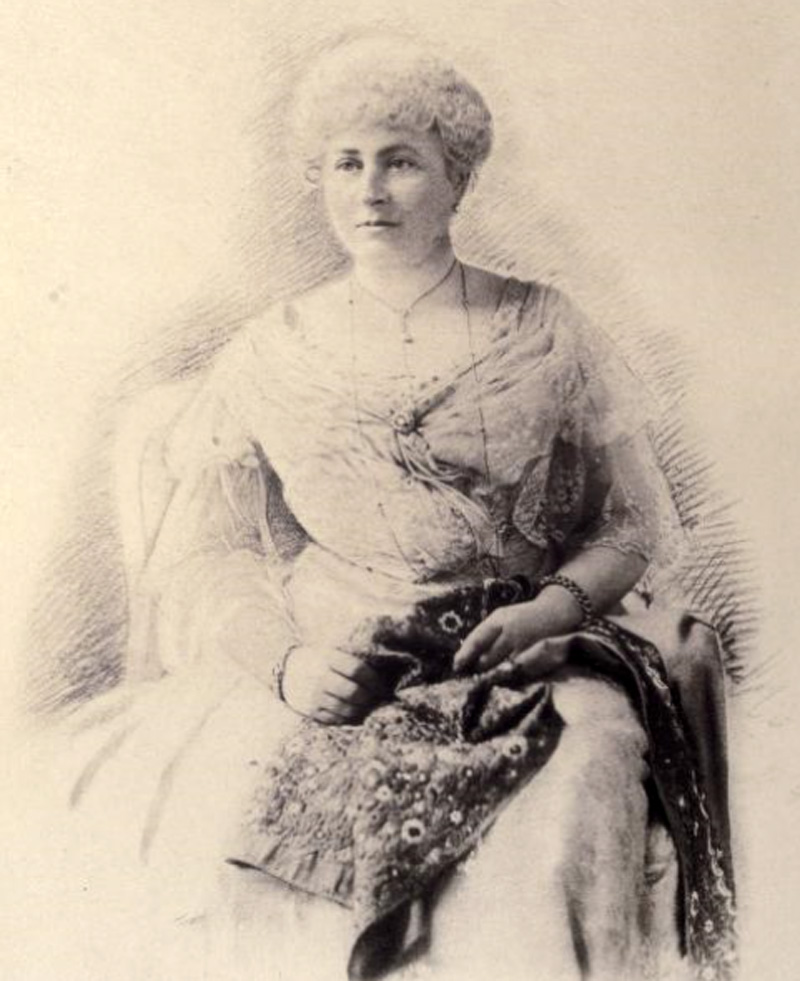
Patience Mary Palmer-Morewood, wife of Charles Rowland Palmer Morewood (1843–1910)

William Palmer-Morewood was born in 1780. His parents were Charles Palmer of Ladbroke and Anne Goodwin the sister of Ellen Morewood. In 1815 he married Clara Blois, second daughter of Sir Charles Blois of Cockfield Hall in Suffolk. The couple had four children, two boys and two girls.

While she was living at Alfreton Hall Clara kept a recipe book during the 1830s which was recently acquired by the Derbyshire Records Office. It contains recipes with medicinal and veterinary cures as well as beauty treatments. According to the Records Office it is a great example of the books of this time with recipes for fashionable foreign dishes such as ‘fromage fondue’, petit choux and ‘Spanish fritters’, but also ‘a cure for dogs who are troubled with the snort’, lip salve and a recipe to wash chintz amongst other delights. Some of the pages from the book are on their website and can be viewed here

William Palmer Morewell died in 1863 and his eldest son Charles Rowland Palmer-Morewood (1819–1875) inherited the Hall. In 1842 Charles had married Georgiana Byron. She was the daughter of Admiral George Anson Byron 7th Lord Byron who had inherited the title from his famous cousin Lord Byron the poet. The couple had nine children, four daughters and five sons.

The 1871 Census shows the household members at this time. There was Charles and his wife Georgiana and some of their children. The servants included a governess, a cook, a butler, nine maids, a coachman, two footmen, a groom and an usher.

Charles died in 1875 and his eldest son also called Charles Rowland Palmer Morewood inherited the property. His photo is shown. In 1873 he married Patience Mary Hervey (photo shown) daughter of Rev. Lord Arthur Charles Hervey. The couple had three children, two sons and a daughter. The youngest son died in infancy in 1889 and Charles erected the Palmer-Moorwood Mausoleum in the churchyard of St Martins at Alfreton. It is still there today and a photo is at this link.

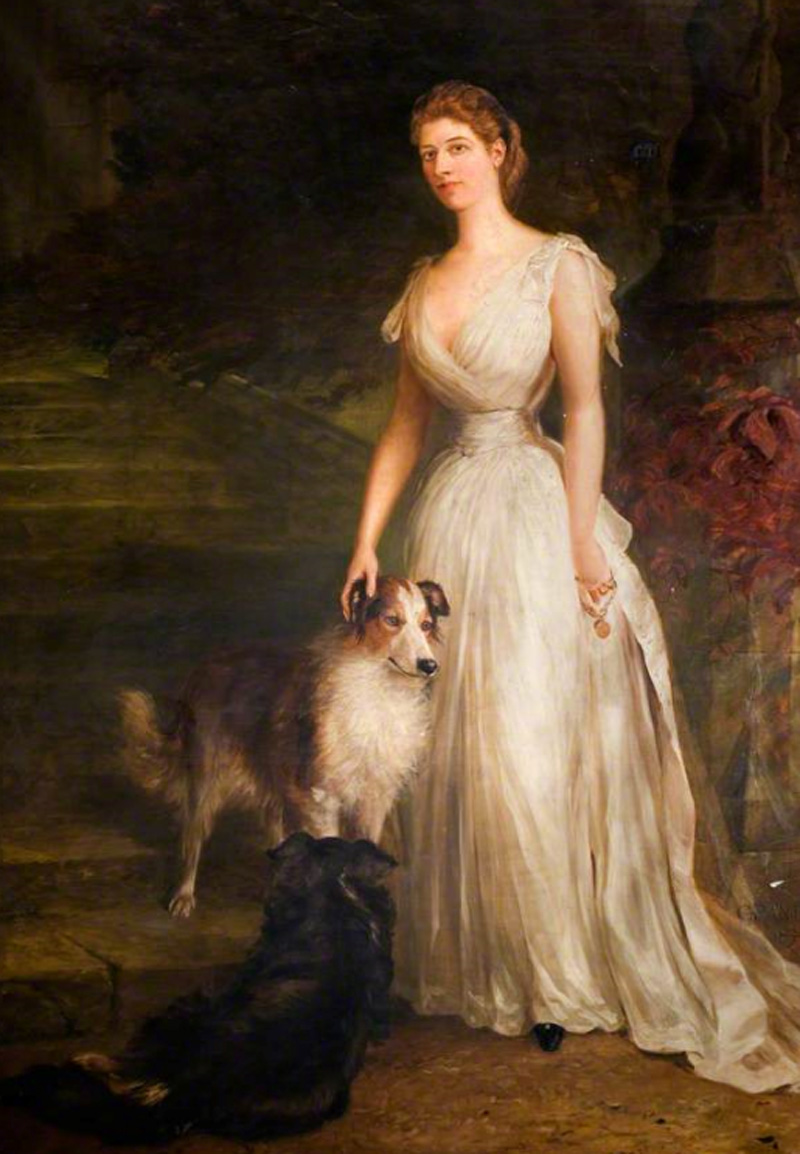
Ellen Mary Palmer-Morewood who became the Countess of Shrewsbury.

In 1882 Charles was involved in a dispute with his four younger brothers and was described in numerous newspapers. In 1881, a Christmas party was held at Alfreton Hall where Charles invited his four brothers. After the meal they all retired to the library where the host was set upon by the four brothers, one of whom had a revolver. They tried to force him to sign over outstanding inheritances, and it was claimed that they had drawn lots to decide who would kill him should he not agree. However, he did not yield, and although he was not shot he was found naked and bleeding by his servants. He lodged charges against his brothers, who all skipped bail and went abroad. At the same time this scandal was occurring the sister of these brothers Ellen Mary Palmer-Morewood who had married Alfred Miller Mundy deserted this family and eloped with Charles John Chetwynd-Talbot, the Earl of Shrewsbury. She later married him and became the Countess of Shrewsbury. A painting of her is shown.

Charles died in 1910 and his son Rowland Charles Arthur Palmer-Morewood inherited Alfreton Hall. He lived there for the next 50 years and several years after he died in 1957 Derbyshire Council bought the property.

== Alfreton Hall today ==
In May 1963 Derbyshire County Council acquired the building and some 90 acres of adjoining parkland for £28,500. In February 1964 the Alfreton Urban District Council bought the hall and 4 acres (16,000 m^{2}) of land from the County Council for £5,000, largely to provide public access to a swimming pool.

Most of the house was demolished in 1968, having been substantially weakened by mining subsidence. However, the 1855 extension, which has Grade II listed building status, was converted into an arts and adult education centre and the land became part of an attractive public park, providing facilities for swimming and other sports. The stables and dovecote are separately listed at Grade II.

The property was sold to Genesis Social Enterprise in 2006 by the County Council and was fully restored to its former grandeur and now provides conferencing and banqueting facilities which can be used for concerts, conferences and weddings. It also hosts the I-ACE development programmes and other events. Alfreton Hall now incorporates a French-style restaurant.

== See also ==
- Listed buildings in Alfreton
