= Redlands Santa Fe Depot District =

Historic district in Redlands, California, US

- U.S. National Register of Historic Places
- U.S. Historic district
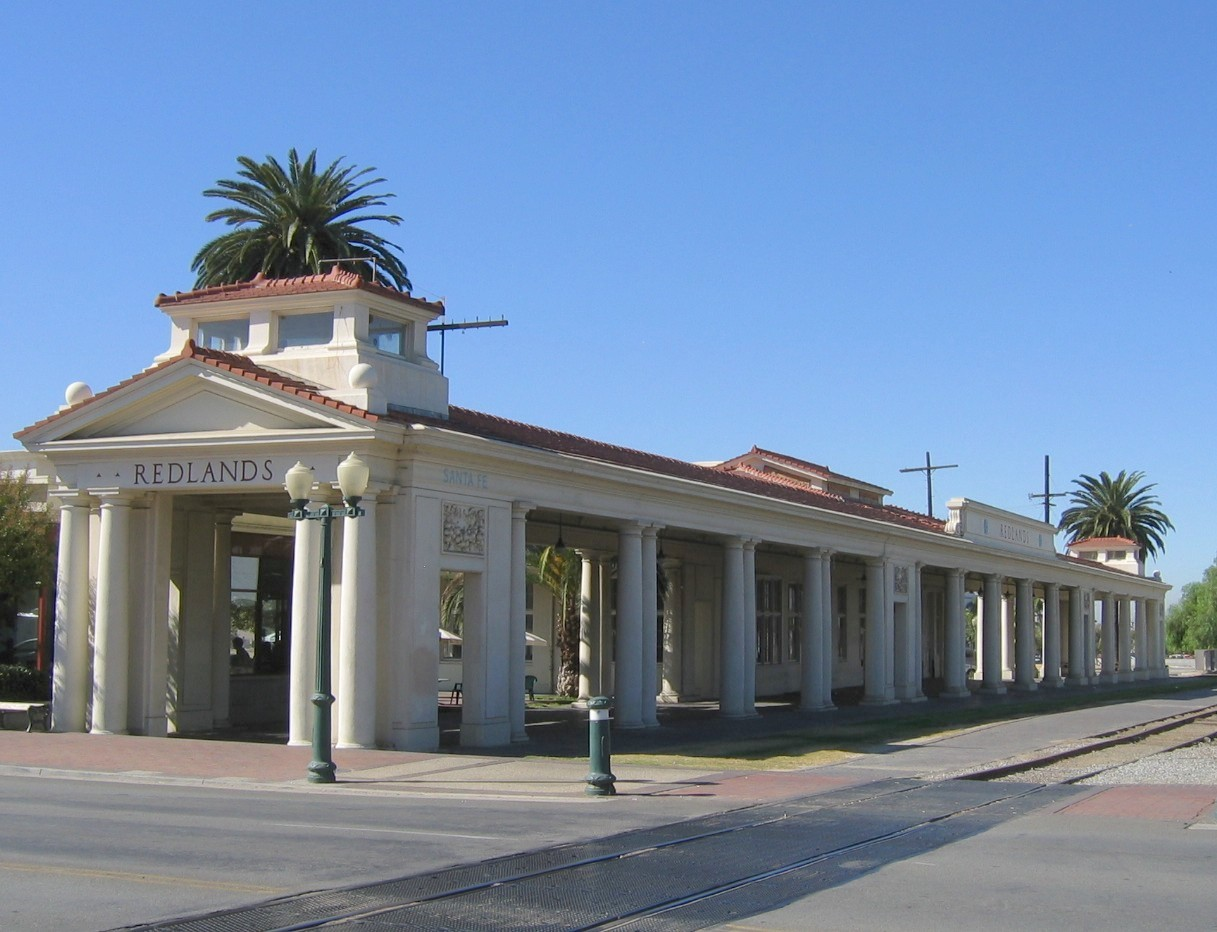

- Location within California Location within the United States
- Location: Roughly bounded by Stuart Ave., N. 5th St., Redlands Blvd., Eureka St. and the SFRR tracks, Redlands, California
- Coordinates: 34°3′31″N 117°10′57″W
- Area: 20 acres (8.1 ha)
- NRHP reference No.: 91001535
- Added to NRHP: October 29, 1991

The Redlands Santa Fe Depot District is a historic commercial district and station located in downtown Redlands. The district is centered on Redlands' Atchison, Topeka and Santa Fe Railway depot, which was established in 1888.

== History ==
The nationally registered district is centered around the current station building, a Classical Revival structure, built in 1909–10 to replace the original depot built in 1888. The Pacific Electric Red Car trolley service, the Redlands Line, ran past the mainline Santa Fe station on Orange Street between 1903 and 1936. This station lost passenger service in 1938.

The district was added to the National Register of Historic Places on October 29, 1991, and the California Points of Historical Interest.

The buildings surrounding the station represent many of the important components of the city's economy, particularly the orange packing industry. Several packing houses remain from the city's heyday as an orange packing center, forming one of the largest remaining groups of orange packing houses in the Inland Empire. A number of the other buildings were used by growers' associations and other groups in the citrus industry. The district also includes three buildings from the city's historic Chinatown, which thrived from the 1880s through the 1920s after Chinese immigrants came to Redlands to build the railroad.

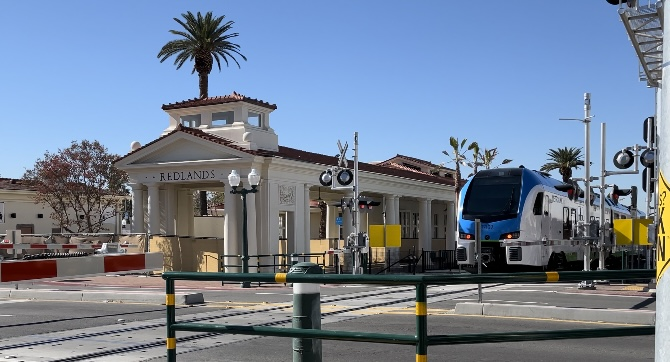
Metrolink's Arrow light rail line train service.

== Redevelopment ==
The depot was purchased from Krikorian Premier Theaters founder George Krikorian by Property One LLC, a real estate development company with ties to Esri executives in September 2017. With new ownership and a name change to Redlands Railway District LLC, the depot was restored and integrated with the adjacent Redlands–Downtown station on the Arrow commuter rail service in 2022. Redlands Railway District LLC redeveloped the surrounding properties as the "Redlands Packing House District" with shops and restaurants. Completed in 2024.

== See also ==
- Smiley Park Historic District
