= Redlands Bowl =

Amphitheatre in California, United States

- The Prosellis
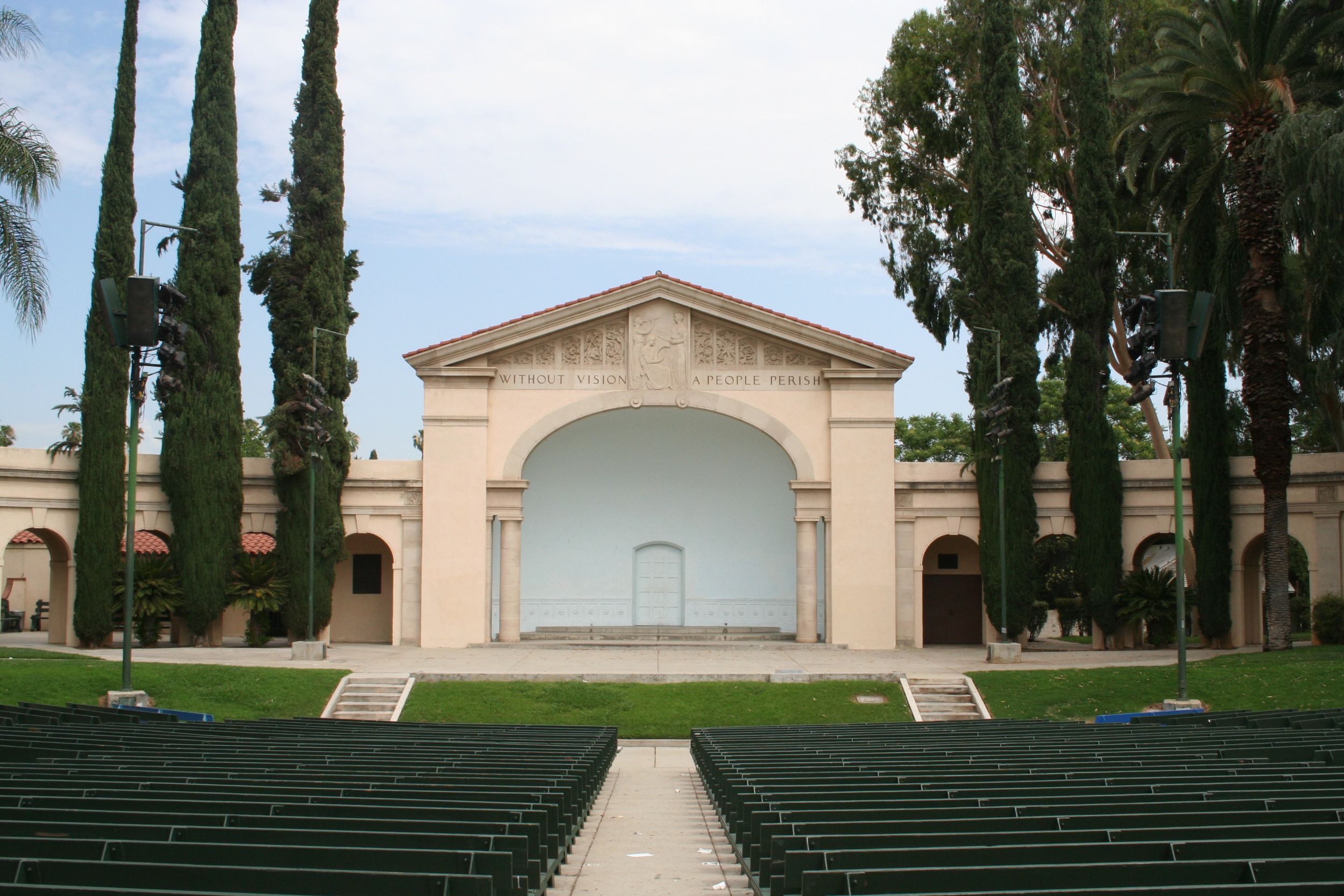
- The Prosellis at Redlands Bowl
- Interactive map of Redlands Bowl
- Address: 25 Grant St; Redlands, CA 92373; United States
- Location: San Bernardino County, California, United States
- Coordinates: 34.0535°N 117.1849°W
- Owner: City of Redlands
- Operator: Redlands Bowl Performing Arts

Construction
- Built: 1930
- Architect: Herbert J. Powell

Website
- redlandsbowl.org

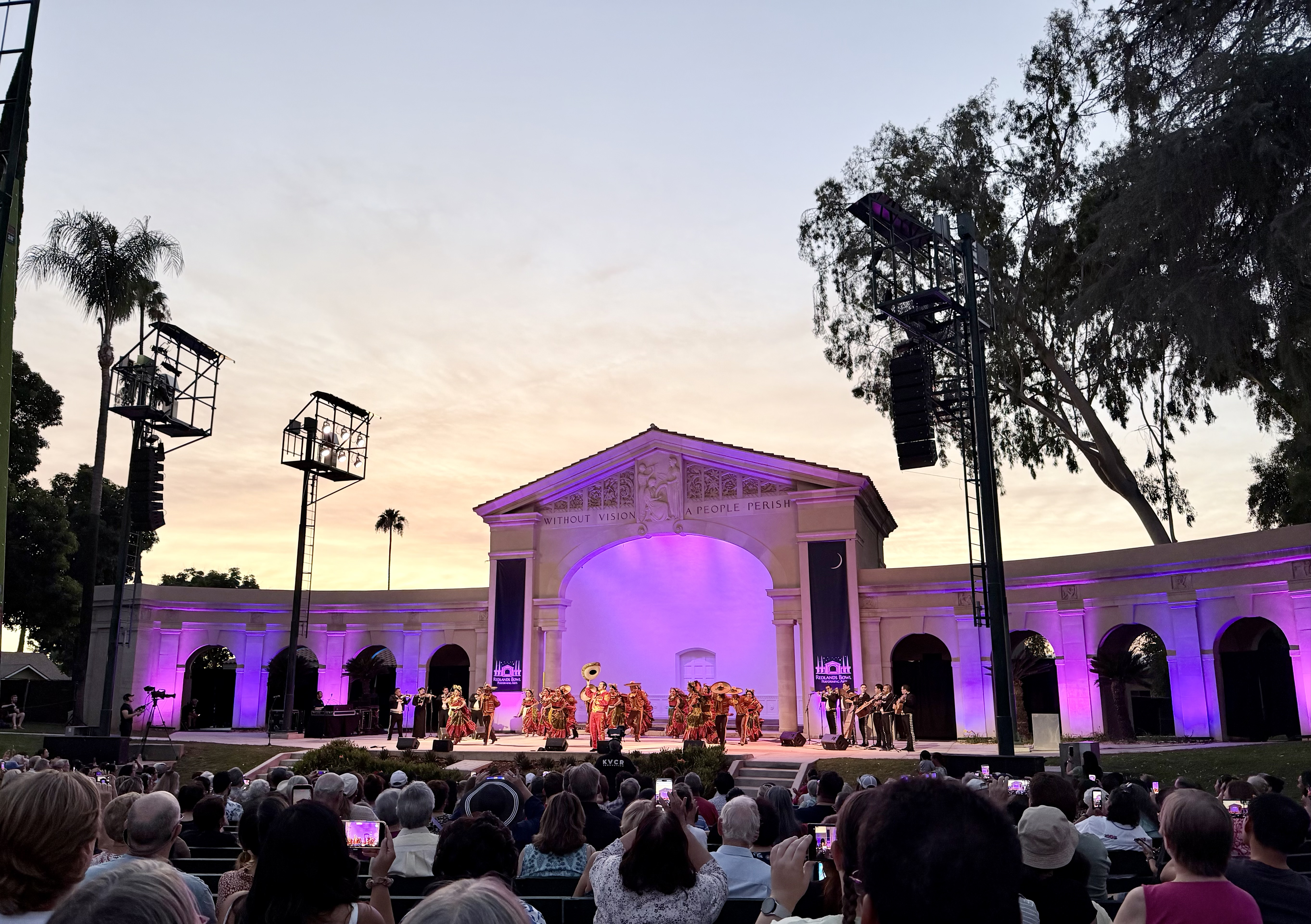
Summer Performance

The Redlands Bowl is an amphitheatre in Redlands, California, USA, founded in 1924. It is used for music and theatrical performances which are offered to the public at no charge. The bowl is within Smiley Park Historic District that also includes, Smiley Park, the A.K. Smiley Public Library and the Lincoln Memorial Shrine.

== History ==
In 1923, local resident Grace Stewart Mullen founded the Redlands Community Music Association and by 1924, she had organized the first season of music concerts at the local Smiley Park. A small band stand shell was located east of the current site, where the Lincoln Memorial Shrine stands now. As the music association gained success, Mullen was successful in collecting donations year round to make the music festival an annual event. She died in 1967.

The existing structure and current site was commissioned and built by local philanthropists, Florence R. and Clarence G. White in 1929. The White family, as new residents of Redlands, gifted a new band stand amphitheater structure they named the "Prosellis," from Latin, loosely meaning "before the seats". Designed by native architect Herbert J. Powell, the Prosellis was designed to match the nearby AK Smiley Public Library's architecture. The new amphitheater by commission, has inscribed, Proverbs 29:18, "Without vision a people perish", across the frieze above the stage.

=== Programs ===
The bowl is owned by the City of Redlands and is considered a public park. It is run by The Redlands Bowl Performing Arts Association, a non-profit separate 501(c)(3) organization. The association now holds the Redlands Bowl Summer Music Festival. The music festival takes place each summer from late June through August, with 18-20 programs in diverse musical genres offered on Tuesday and Friday nights. It is the oldest continuous music festival in the United States at which no admission is charged.

The Redlands Shakespeare Festival has occurred the last three weekends in May every year since its inception in 2004, presenting three full-scale Shakespearean productions in repertory, along with a series of educational lectures, community workshops, and special events. The 2014 festival was canceled.

The Redlands Bowl also serves as a venue for other productions and community events, including high school graduation ceremonies for local Redlands schools.

=== Mission Gables House ===
The Redlands Community Music Association purchased the 7,500 sq ft Mission Gables House directly southeast of the bowl from the city of Redlands in the 1990s after it was deemed uninhabitable and considered for demolition. The home was completely renovated and excavated to add restrooms for events, meetings and performances at a cost of over $1.8 million. The home overlooks the Redlands Bowl and is now used as executive office space for the Association and Performing Arts groups.
