= Margaret Miles-Bramwell =

Founder of Slimming World

- Born: Margaret Birch; 20 April 1948; London, England
- Died: 2 February 2025 (aged 76); Mallorca, Spain
- Education: Grammar School
- Occupation: Entrepreneur
- Known for: founding Slimming World
- Spouse(s): Roy Miles, Tony Whittaker
- Children: three

Margaret Miles-Bramwell OBE or Margaret Glynis Whittaker (1948 – 2 February 2025) was the British founder of Slimming World and its charity SMILES. She was adopted by a couple and brought up in Derbyshire. Pregnancy ended her time at Grammar School and she was a married mother by sixteen. She co-founded Slimming World and it grew to have thousands of branches. She later bought a yacht company, a club in Mallorca and was declared Business Woman of the Year.

== Life ==
Margaret Miles-Bramwell was born on 20th April 1948 in London and she was adopted whilst a baby. Her adopted parents were Emma Selina and Samuel Birch and they brought her up in South Normanton in Derbyshire. She went to grammar school but she was obliged to leave when she became pregnant aged fifteen. The child was called Claire and Margaret married Claire's father, Roy Miles, in 1964 when she was 16. She worked in an office, she worked in shops which included stacking supermarket shelves and managing a furniture store.

Miles-Bramwell and a friend started a slimming group in a church hall in Alfreton because she was concerned for her own weight. By the end of that year there were 25 different groups in her county and in nearby Nottinghamshire. She was the leader but more like an elder than a boss. By 1988 there were a thousand Slimming World groups and that number grew to five thousand by 1996.

In 2000 the National Health Service (NHS) recognised Slimming World's success by creating an official referral facility. Doctors could prescribe a series of 12 sessions to allow patients to control their weight. It was the first time that the National Health Service had collaborated with a slimming organisation.

By 2006 she and her husband had bought and transformed a company called Pearl Yachts and they opened a club and restaurant in Mallorca called the Mood Club. She was awarded an OBE in 2009 noting her contribution to health and charity. She credited her early success because Slimming World was based around respect where her early rivals relied on humiliation. She had founded a charity in 1997 which in time raised £25m by the actions of "Slimmers Making It a Little Easier for Someone" aka SMILES.

Her second husband, Tony Whittaker, died in 2021. In 2023 she was recognised as Business Woman of the Year. At the time she also owned a theatre in Majorca as well as Pearl Yachts. Miles-Bramwell died in Mallorca in 2025. Her funeral cortege passed by her company's headquarters, where 500 people were employed, en route to a funeral in Derby Cathedral.
