= David Nieper Academy =

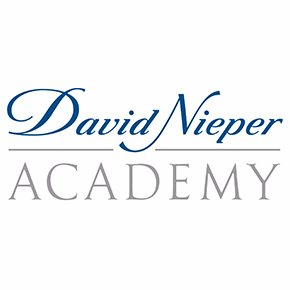

Location
- Grange Street; Alfreton; Derbyshire, DE55 7JA; England; 53.0929°N 1.3854°W

Information
- Type: Academy
- Motto: Aspire Endeavour Succeed
- Established: 16 March 1939
- Local authority: Derbyshire
- Trust: Christopher Nieper Education Trust
- Department for Education URN: 142405 Tables
- Ofsted: Reports
- Chair of Trustees: Christopher Nieper
- Headteacher: Richard White
- Gender: Co-educational
- Age: 11 to 18
- Website: davidnieper.academy

David Nieper Academy is a co-educational secondary school and sixth form located in Alfreton in the English county of Derbyshire. It is the first school in Derbyshire to be sponsored by a local business.

It is the 7th most oversubscribed school in Derbyshire.

== Performance ==
The academy is currently underperforming compared to local and national schools. Its Progress 8 score is "Below Average" at -0.34. Only 7% of students were entered for the English Baccalaureate (EBacc) in the 2022-23 year, compared to 30% in the local authority and 39% nationally. The percentage of students that achieved a grade 5 or above in English and maths GCSEs was also lower than the national average, at 22% compared to 45%. This dropped to only 10% for disadvantaged pupils. Of the 133 pupils entered in 2022-23, 7 spoke English as a second language.

In 2021, 84% of pupils stayed in education or training for at least two terms after Key Stage 4, which is lower than the average of 94% in England.

The academy was rated as "Good" by Ofsted in 2022, after having been rated as "Requires Improvement" in 2019. The 2019 report noted that pupils did not make good progress, especially SEND pupils, but praised the efforts of Headteacher Kathryn Hobbs and the leadership team. The 2022 report showed that this had been improved upon, saying the provision for vulnerable students was a strength, and still had good safeguarding, and leadership, but that PSHCE needed better implementation.

== History ==
=== First Opening ===
The school first opened on 16 March 1939, by Alderman W. Mortimer Wilson, MA, whose name went on to be borne by the school for close on 70 years. The school opened as a non-selective establishment with two separate schools within, the boys and girls being educated separately. The first headmaster of the boys' school was Wilfred Dawes and the headmistress of the girls' school was Miss Cresswell. After the Second World War four houses were introduced named Brindley, Nightingale, Royce and Stephenson. Originally in 1939 it was named "Alfreton Central Elementary School", and in 1944 it became known as "Alfreton Secondary Modern School".

=== Comprehensive School status ===
The school became a comprehensive in the late 1960s. Miss Cresswell then retired and Mr Dawes took full control of the school. During his time as headmaster the school was recognised as a modal for the comprehensive system. In recognition of his achievements, Wilfred Dawes was appointed O.B.E. for his services to Education. He was a strong Socialist and supporter of the comprehensive system. He retired in 1974.

=== Arts College Status ===
The school gained specialist Arts College status in 2008 and was renamed Alfreton Grange Arts College.

On 22, July 2013, the headteacher, Gail Giles was suspended pending investigation from the governing body. Then two months later in September 2013 the school was deemed inadequate by Ofsted and the school was placed into special measures.

=== Academy status ===
Previously a community school administered by Derbyshire County Council, in September 2016 Alfreton Grange Arts College converted to academy status and was renamed "David Nieper Academy". In preparation for the conversion, In April 2016, Kathryn Hobbs was named the new Headteacher of the school.

In 2017, the new purpose-built £15 million building was opened, and all site work was completed in 2019 by VolkerFitzpatrick Construction, after collapse of construction firm Carillion. In 2022, the academy applied for planning permission for an outdoor seating canopy as it had grown quicker than expected, and the building could not accommodate all students at once.

In September 2023, Richard White was announced as the new Headteacher, following the expansion of the Christopher Nieper Education Trust to include Stonebroom Primary And Nursery School and the Kathryn Hobbs moving to work in other areas of the trust after 7 years as headteacher.

== Notable former pupils ==
- Joe Bennett - Vice President for Academic Affairs at Berklee College of Music
- Niamh Emerson - Olympic heptathlete
