= Robert Watchorn =

English coal miner, businessman, philanthropost, union leader

- Born: April 5, 1859; Alfreton, Derbyshire, England
- Died: April 13, 1944 (aged 85); Redlands, California, U.S.
- Occupations: Coal miner; union leader; immigration commissioner; businessman; philanthropist
- Spouse: Alma Jessica Simpson
- Children: 2

Robert Watchorn (April 5, 1859 – April 13, 1944) was an English-American coal miner, union leader, immigration commissioner, businessman, and philanthropist. He worked as an Immigration Commissioner at Ellis Island and the U.S.–Canada border. In his later years, Watchorn worked in the oil business and amassed a sizable fortune.

== Early life ==
Robert Watchorn was born in Alfreton, Derbyshire, England on April 5, 1859, to John and Alice Watchorn. His formal education started and ended with a Church of England school for boys, which he attended up to his eleventh year. Watchorn left school to earn money working in the coal mines, though he "continued his studies at night". Before the US Civil War, Great Britain was a large contributor to the mining population that immigrated to the United States for employment. This trend picked up again after the Civil War, and Watchorn was one of the Derbyshire miners who came over at this time. He was 22 years old when he immigrated to the United States and found a job in the coal mines of the Pittsburgh area.

== Union work ==
The miner became very involved in union work once he moved to the United States. Watchorn was elected President of the Pittsburgh District Miners' Union and named secretary of the National Miners' Union in 1888. These unions merged into the United Mine Workers of America two years later, and Watchorn was made secretary of this new organization. In his union years, he was described as "one of the pioneers in the fight against sweatshops and abuses of child labor in Pennsylvania factories"

== Immigration work ==
=== Time with the U.S. Immigration Service ===
Watchorn worked for the U.S. Immigration Service for 14 years, first as an inspector at Ellis Island, and later as Immigration Commissioner at the U.S.–Canada border. He was appointed commissioner in 1905, and instituted several reforms at Ellis Island, "including construction of a small island on which were built hospitals and new dormitories". When President Roosevelt left office, President Taft did not renominate him for the position. Many duties were bestowed on Robert Watchorn while he was serving as a commissioner. For instance, President McKinley "sent him to investigate the causes of the tremendous emigration of Jewish people to the United States". The commissioner's report was used by Secretary of State John Hays in his letter to the U.S. Minister to Greece. This letter resulted in "an appeal to Rumania for amelioration of its anti-Semitic laws"

=== Views on American immigration policy ===
When he worked under union leader Terrence V. Powderly, Watchorn appeared to be an advocate of immigrant restrictions, particularly contract-labor laws. However, while he was operating as an immigration commissioner under President Theodore Roosevelt, Watchorn took a laxer stance. While the commissioner was very concerned about letting in any immigrant who was likely to become a public charge, it was also noted that he "hated" to order deportations. In an article he wrote for Metropolitan Magazine that appeared shortly after his dismissal in 1909, Watchorn addressed many points of contention in United States immigration policy. He also criticized popular nativist behaviors held by a portion of the U.S. citizenry while he was alive. "To call immigrants a horde at once suggests a dreadful picture; to refer to them as a swarm suggests a pestilence; and to designate them as individually as "sheenies", "dagoes", Huns and Slavs incites derision", Watchorn wrote. He criticized these commonplace slurs, which he dubbed as indicidant of public opinion at the time. As the article came to a close, Watchorn called the nation to "bend every energy to shut out the "camp follower," the criminal, the destitute, the immoral, and the seriously diseases mentally and physically, and we shall rejoice in the strong, the healthy, and the industrious [immigrants]. Such a statement is exemplary of Watchorn's later views on immigration.

== Entering the oil industry ==
After resigning as immigration commissioner, Watchorn entered the oil business in 1909. He first worked as an assistant to the president and treasurer of the United Oil Company of California, until he resigned in 1912. He then founded and was president of the Watchorn Oil and Gas Company in Oklahoma in 1916. Watchorn's success in the oil industry allowed him to amass a sizeable fortune.

== Philanthropy ==
For most of his life, he was known as a "staunch" Methodist, and the religious part of him played a role in a significant amount of his donations. For example, Watchorn gave his two-hundred-acre New York estate to the Atlantic Union Conference of the Seventh Day Adventist Church, with the understanding that it was to be used as a church-operated medical facility. He also made sizable donations to Protestant churches in California, Oklahoma, and his home country England. Watchorn's donations from the year 1915-1936 totaled nearly US$1.5 million, and Robert Watchorn Charities, Ltd. Donated over $3 million to a number of charities from 1936 to 1957.

== Personal life ==
Robert Watchorn married Alma Jessica Simpson on June 30, 1891, in Columbus, Ohio. They had two children, Robert Kinnear and Emory Ewart Watchorn. Robert died in infancy, and Ewart died in 1921 from an illness contracted while serving in World War I. Robert Watchorn later built the Abraham Lincoln Memorial Shrine in Redlands, California in memory of Ewart

== Death ==
Robert Watchorn died in Redlands, California, on April 13, 1944, at the age of 85. Buried at Hollywood Forever Cemetery in Los Angeles, California.
