= Smiley Park Historic District =

Historic district in California, United States

- U.S. National Register of Historic Places
- U.S. Historic district
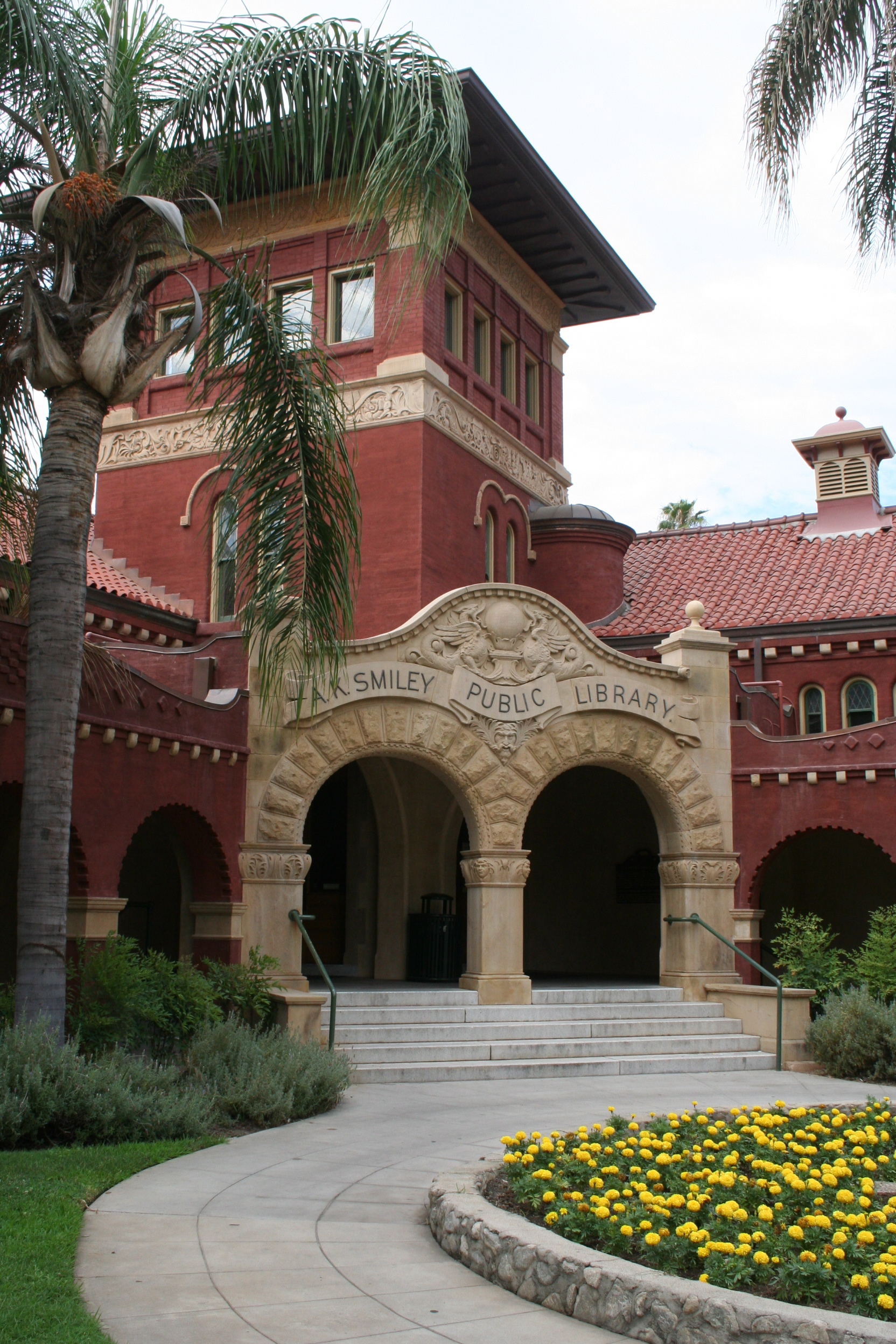
- The A.K. Smiley Public Library

- Location within California Location within the United States
- Location: Roughly bounded by Brookside Ave., Cajon St., Cypress Ave. and Buena Vista St., Redlands, California
- Coordinates: 34°3′3″N 117°10′56″W
- Area: 109 acres (44 ha)
- Architectural style: Colonial Revival, Classical Revival, American Craftsman
- NRHP reference No.: 94001487
- Added to NRHP: December 29, 1994

The Smiley Park Historic District is a residential historic neighborhood in Redlands, California, United States. Adjacent immediately south of the downtown area. The neighborhood is centered on Smiley Park, which was named for benefactors Alfred and Albert Smiley and includes the A. K. Smiley Public Library, the Redlands Bowl and Lincoln Memorial Shrine.

== History ==
Development in the district began in 1887 as much of Southern California grew rapidly due to the expanding citrus industry. Through the turn of the century, new residents mainly built Victorian homes, either in the form of larger Queen Anne designs or as smaller cottages. The Classical Revival style became popular around 1900, and after 1908 most new homes had American Craftsman designs. Growth in the district stopped in 1913 after a freeze crippled Redlands' orange industry; development in the city did not fully resume until after World War I, and later homes were mainly built outside the district.

The district was added to the National Register of Historic Places on December 29, 1994.

== See also ==
- Redlands Santa Fe Depot District
