= Lincoln Memorial Shrine =

Abraham Lincoln memorial in Redlands, California

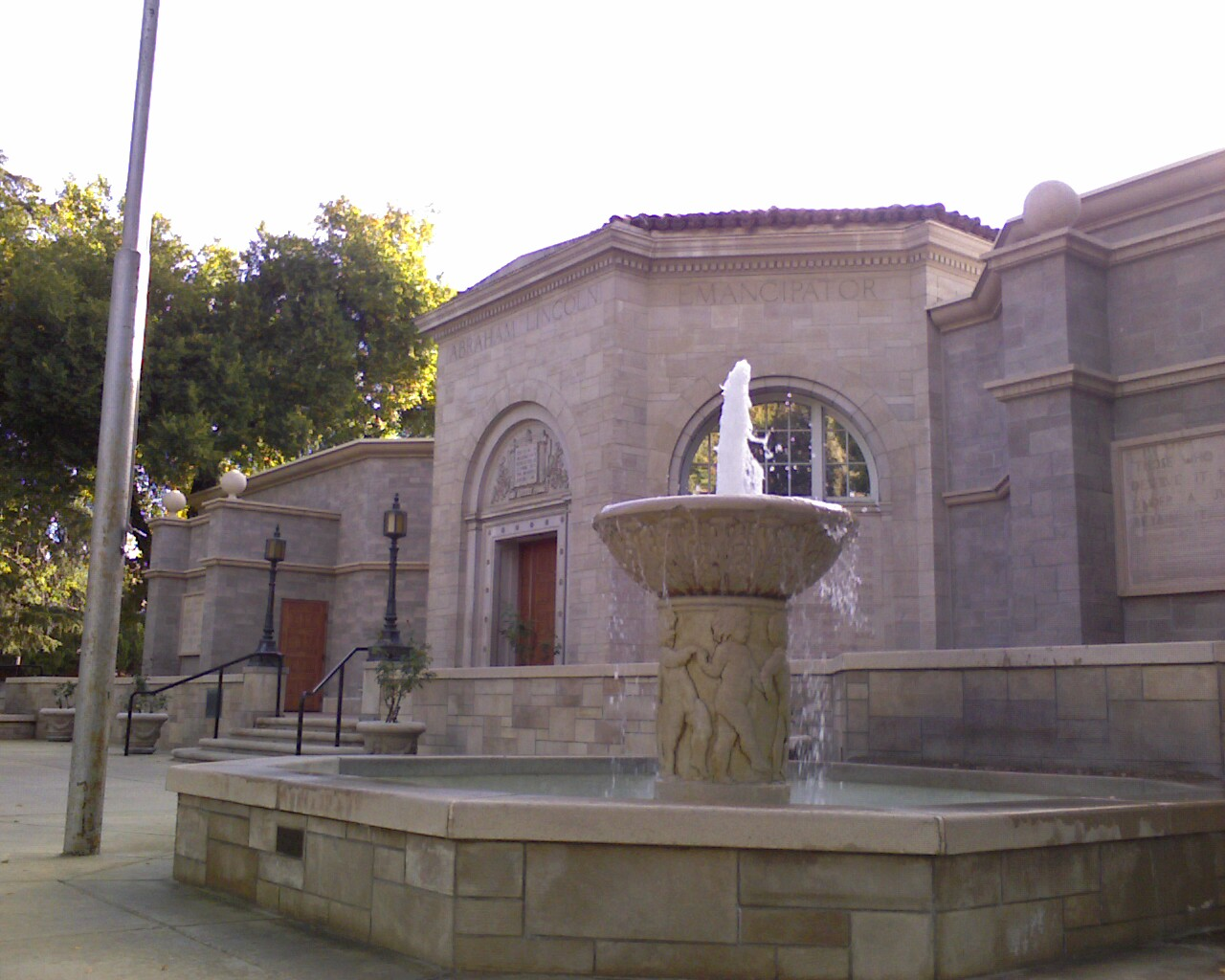
- Interactive map of Lincoln Memorial Shrine
- 34°03′14″N 117°11′00″W
- Location: Redlands, California

History
- Established: February 12, 1932

Site notes
- Visitors: 100,000 (in 2019)

The Lincoln Memorial Shrine in Redlands, California, is a memorial and research center dedicated to the memory of Abraham Lincoln, the 16th President of the United States of America. It was opened on February 12, 1932, by local philanthropist Robert Watchorn as a monument to his deceased and only son, Emory Ewart Watchorn. The memorial is located at 125 West Vine Street behind the A. K. Smiley Public Library, adjacent to the Redlands Bowl and within Smiley Park Historic District. The Lincoln Memorial Shrine is open daily, except on Mondays and majors holidays, from 1 PM to 5 PM. As the largest memorial and research center dedicated to Abraham Lincoln on the West Coast of the United States, it possesses the largest Lincoln-related memorabilia collection in the region. Entrance is free.

== History ==
Robert Watchorn agreed to donated $60,000 on May 6, 1931, for the city to construct the Memorial Shrine, with a pledge by the city to upkeep the museum. The Memorial Shrine was dedicated by the Watchorn family for their only adult surviving son, Emory Watchorn, who died at the age of twenty-five in 1921 due to complications from service as an open-air cockpit pilot in WWI. Years after his death, the Watchorns decided to build the memorial at their winter home in Redlands. A tribute to Lincoln, as Robert and Emory shared a mutual interest in the life of President Lincoln. Designed by Elmer Grey and interior murals created by Dean Cornwell. Designed in an octagonal shape. Whatchorn also donated a bust of Lincoln by George Grey Barnard he acquired in 1922.

The Watchorn Lincoln Memorial Association was created. The association along with the city's A.K. Smiley public library hold that pledge to upkeep. They host the Lincoln Dinner Sponsorship fund. The association conducts a dinner as a fundraising event for the Memorial Shrine. The dinner is held at the Orton Center at the University of Redlands yearly. The Memorial Shrine was expanded with two wings in 1998. Tripled the size of museum space. The Memorial Shrine obtained the Watchorn Family Collection papers and portraits in September 2008 for $108,000. Obtains letter and books from the time Watchorn was an immigration commissioner at Ellis Island from 1905 to 1909. The current curator is Nathan Gonzalez. Norman Rockwell donated his painting to the memorial shrine in 1945. The Lincoln themed work entitled Thoughts on Peace on Lincoln’s Birthday, is displayed in the west wing of the museum.

During boy scout week, since 1940, several local Boy Scouts and Girl Scouts troops march to the Memorial Shrine in honor of Lincoln. Parade is held on Lincoln's Birthday yearly and ends with American Civil War re-enactors and various civil war displays.

== Gallery ==
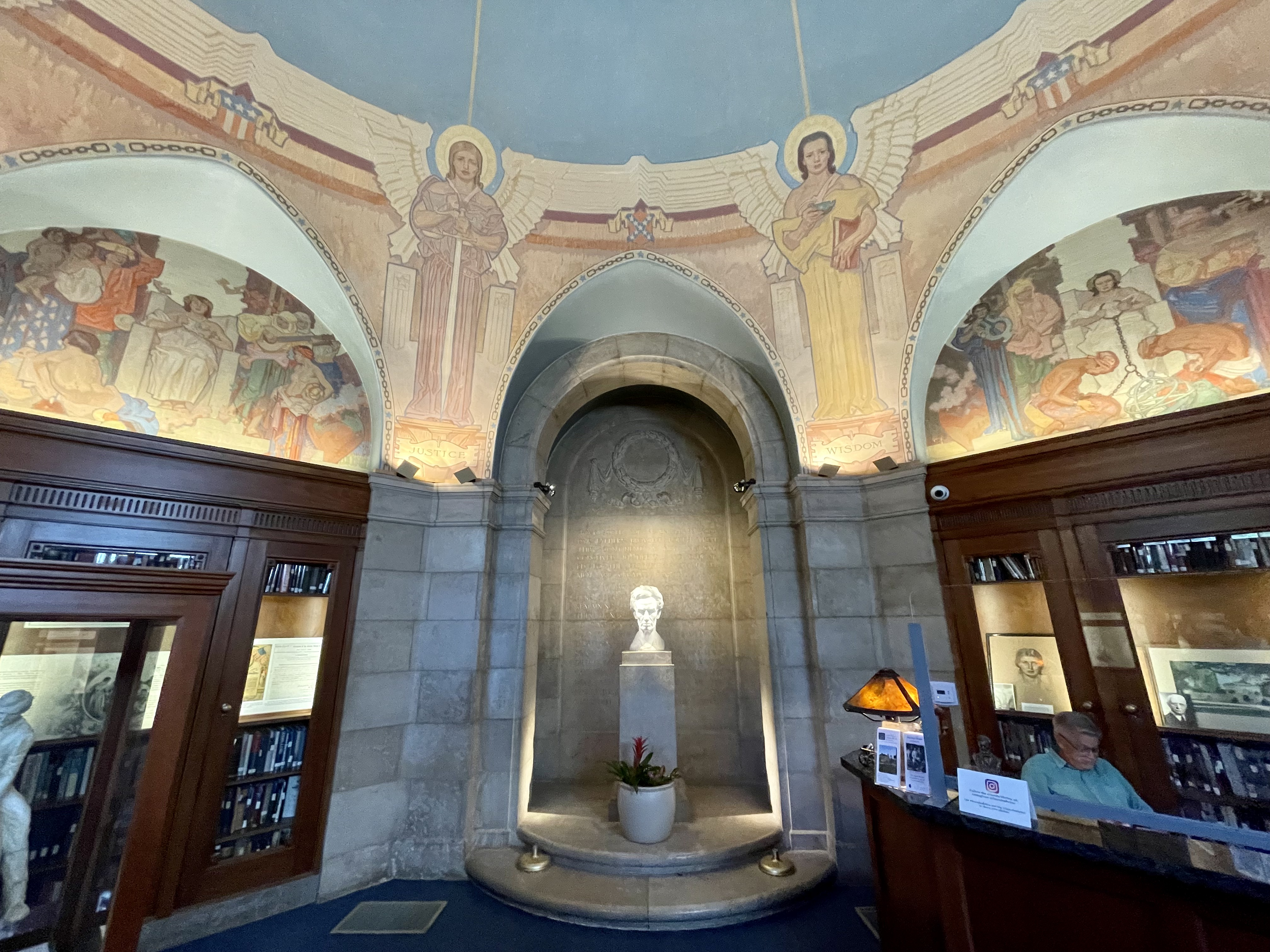
Lincoln bust by George Grey Barnard

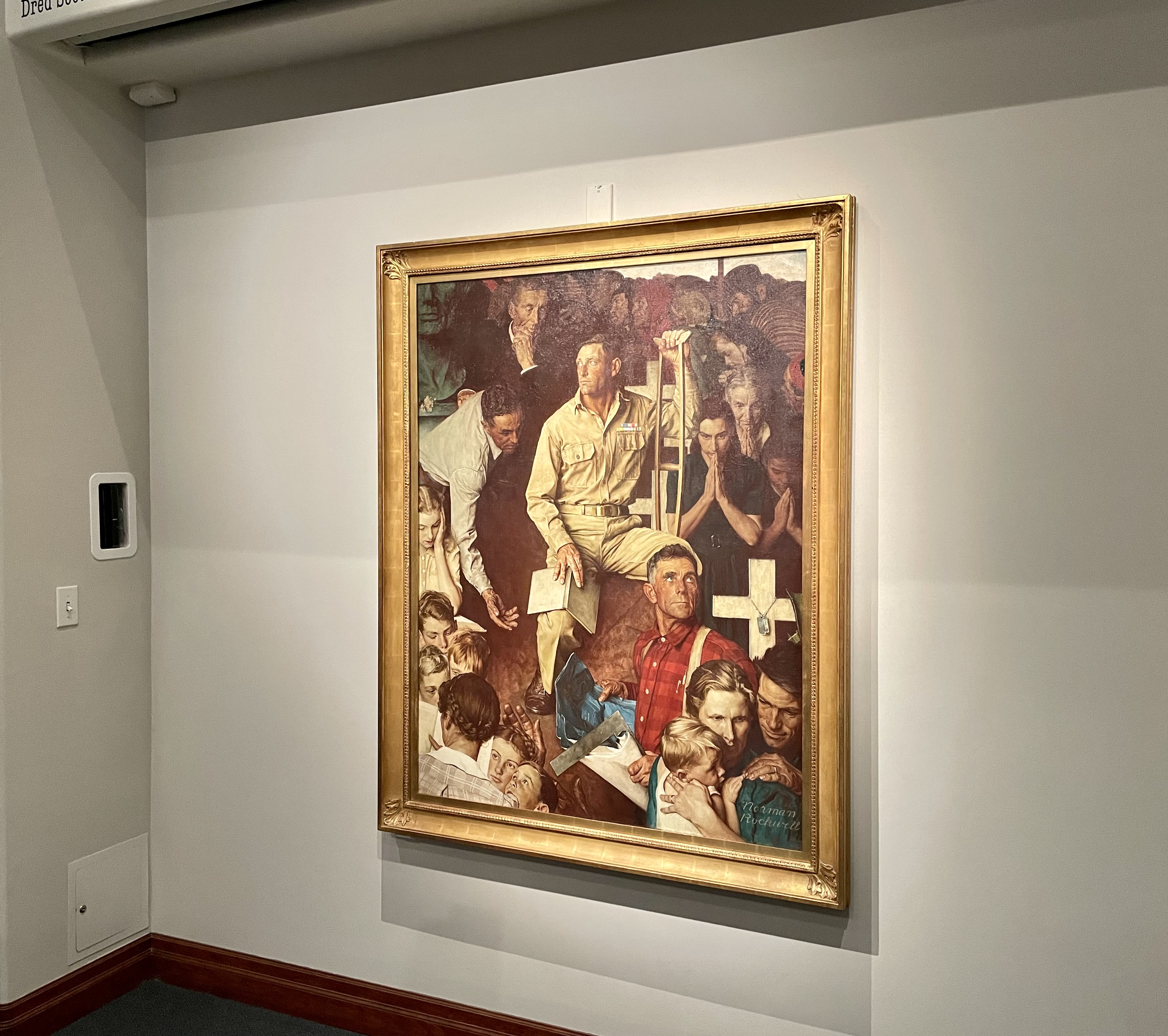
Norman Rockwell Painting

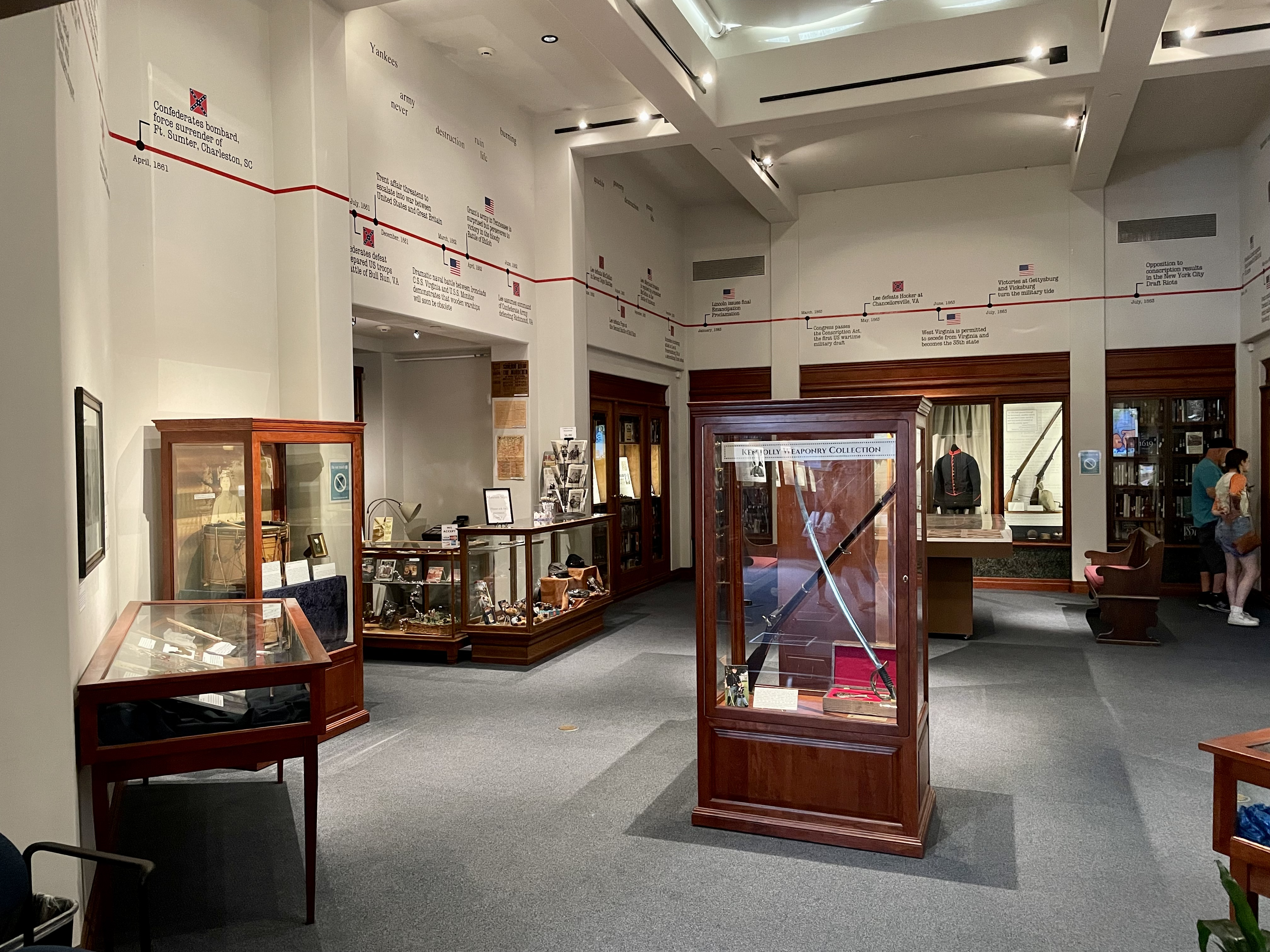
East Wing of Shrine dedicated to the US Civil War
