= A. K. Smiley Public Library =

- U.S. National Register of Historic Places
- California Historical Landmark
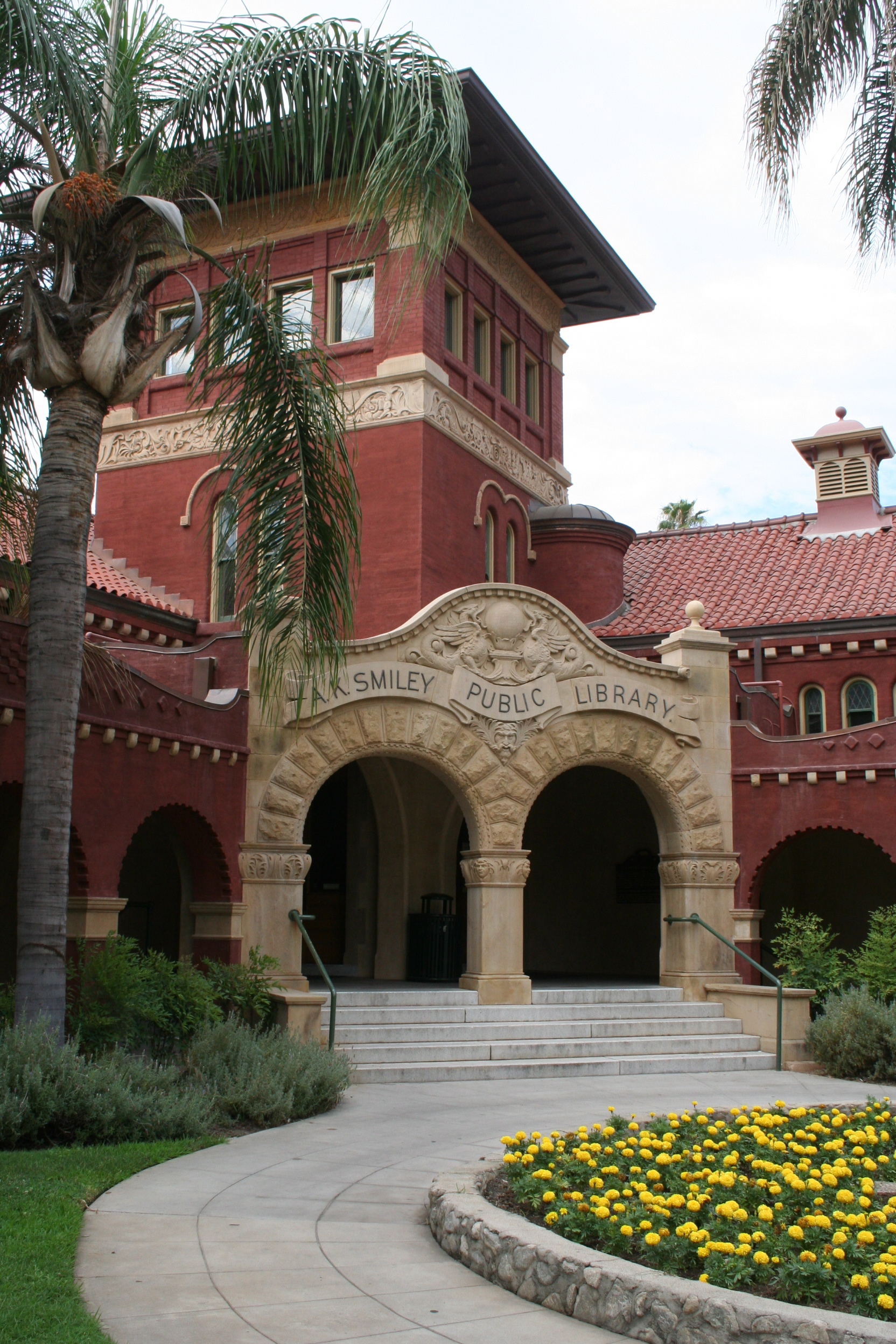

- Location within California Location within the United States
- Location: 125 W. Vine St., Redlands, California
- Coordinates: 34°03′16″N 117°11′02″W
- Area: 2 acres (0.81 ha)
- Built: 1898
- Architect: Griffith, T.R.
- Architectural style: Mission Revival, Moorish Revival
- NRHP reference No.: 76000513
- CHISL No.: 994

Significant dates
- Added to NRHP: December 12, 1976
- Designated CHISL: August 17, 1990

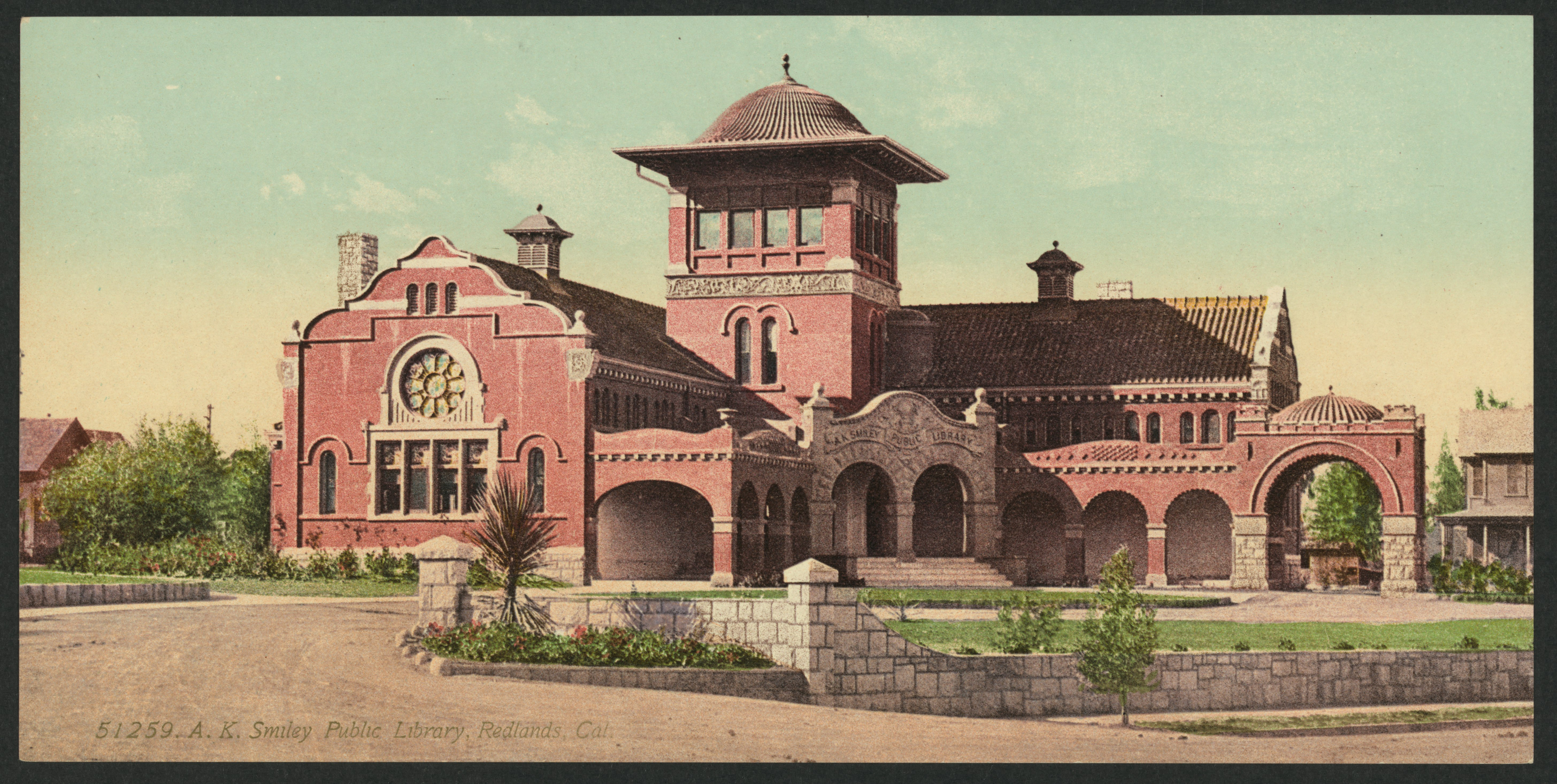
A. K. Smiley Public Library before 1905

The A. K. Smiley Public Library is a public library located at 125 W. Vine St. in Redlands, California. Built in 1898, the library was donated to Redlands by philanthropist Albert K. Smiley. The library is within Smiley Park Historic District and adjacent the Redlands Bowl and Lincoln Memorial Shrine.

== History ==
Architect T.R. Griffith designed the library in a style which has alternately been described as Mission Revival and Moorish Revival and includes a variety of elements from additional styles. The building has a tile roof and parapets topping arcades on its sides, which suggest a Mission Revival influence; however, the battlement and the curves in the parapet are Moorish Revival elements. In addition, elements of the arches in the arcade, the windows, and the roof ridge were borrowed from classical, Gothic, Spanish Romanesque, and Oriental themes. The library still serves as the Redlands public library. In addition, it houses a collection of materials on native tribes in California donated by Andrew Carnegie, as well as a collection of rare materials about Southern California and local history.

The library was added to the National Register of Historic Places on December 12, 1976. It was designated a California Historical Landmark on August 17, 1990.

== See also ==
- California Historical Landmarks in San Bernardino County, California
