= Alfreton =

Town and civil parish in Amber Valley, Derbyshire, England

Coordinates: 53.097°N 1.380°W

- Town
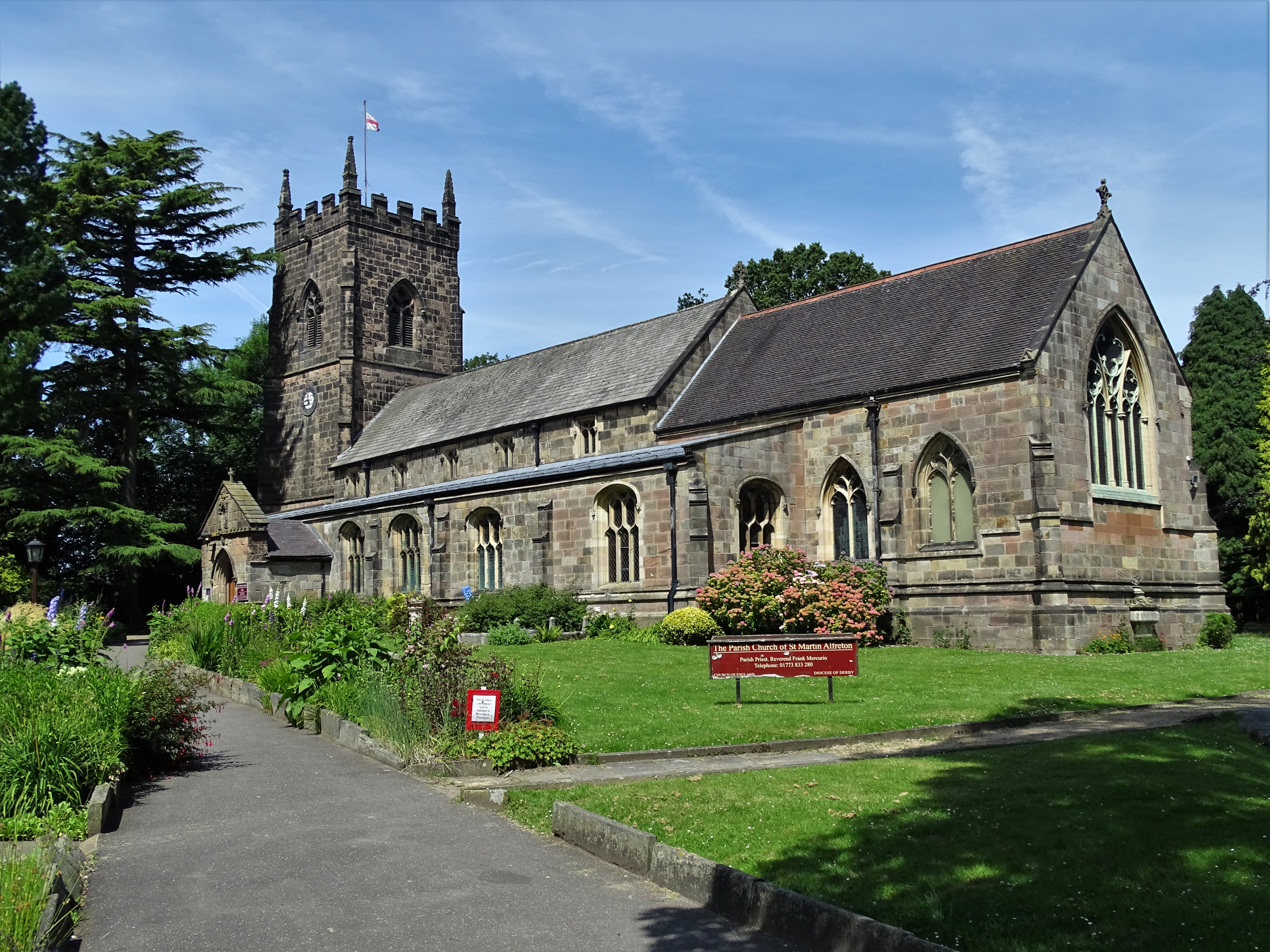
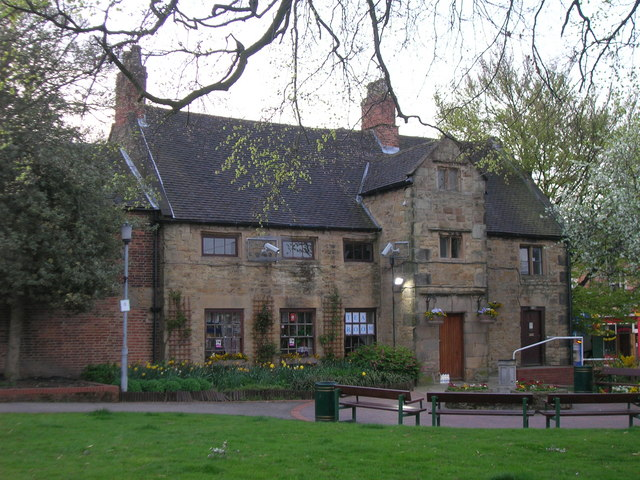
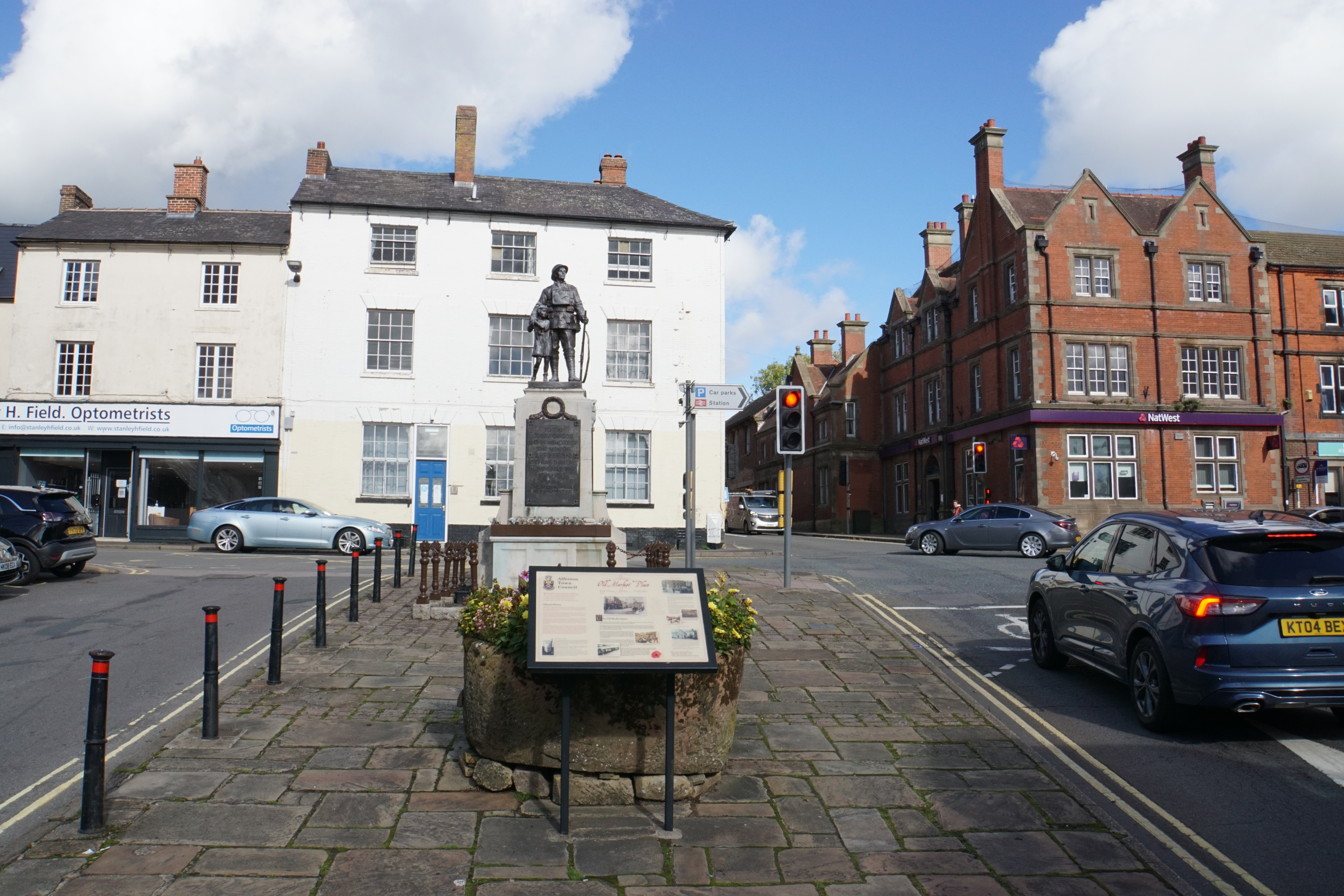
- St Martin's Church Alfreton House Old Market Square

- Location within Derbyshire
- Interactive map of Alfreton
- Area: 1.765 sq mi (4.57 km^{2})
- Population: 24,302 (2023)
  - Density: 13,769/sq mi (5,316/km^{2})
- OS grid reference: SK414558
  - London: 122.5 mi (197.1 km)
- Civil parish: Alfreton
- District: Amber Valley
- Shire county: Derbyshire
- Region: East Midlands
- Country: England
- Sovereign state: United Kingdom
- Post town: ALFRETON
- Postcode district: DE55
- Dialling code: 01773
- Police: Derbyshire
- Fire: Derbyshire
- Ambulance: East Midlands
- UK Parliament: Amber Valley
- Website: alfretontowncouncil.co.uk

Alfreton (/ˈɒlfrɪtən/ OL-frih-tən or /ˈælfrɪtən/ AL-frih-tən) is a town and civil parish in the Amber Valley district of Derbyshire, England. The town was formerly a Norman Manor and later an Urban District. The population of the Alfreton parish was 8,799 at the 2021 census. The villages of Ironville, Riddings, Somercotes and Swanwick were historically part of the Manor and Urban District, and the population including these was 24,476 in 2001.

== History ==
Alfreton is said to have been founded by Alfred the Great (King Alfred) and to have derived its name from him. The placename appears in different forms throughout the ages, such as 'Elstretune' in the Domesday Book (1086), but the earliest record appears to occur in 1004AD in the will of Wulfric Spot, the founder of Burton Abbey. Amongst his bequests was 'Aelfredingtune', or 'Alfred's farmstead', which is believed to relate to Alfreton. However, there is no evidence that this Alfred was the aforementioned king.

To the southwest near Pentrich was a Roman fortlet on the major road known as Icknield Street. Another Roman road known as Lilley Street ran from there to the southern end of Alfreton, suggesting that settlement in the area predated the time of King Alfred by several centuries.

The initial settlement was centred at the top of the modern King Street hill, where the original market place developed. On the hilltop there was also an ancient meeting hall (the 'Moot Hall') until 1914, and several inns became established over the centuries, some of which survive today. To the west was a manor house, and the nearby Church of St. Martin, parts of which date back to 1200. The manor of Alfreton spread over lands to the south and east, including the parishes of Somercotes, Swanwick, Riddings, and Ironville. The first Lord of the Manor was Earl Roger de Busli, who delegated the position to Baron Ralf Ingram. The position was passed down variously through heredity, gift, and sale over the centuries up until William Palmer-Morewood, the last Lord of Alfreton, who died in 1957.

The economy during the Middle Ages centred on agriculture. However, the presence of readily accessible and extensive deposits of coal and ironstone in the area meant that mining and iron-working grew in importance. In some parts of the manor, coal seams were so close to the surface they were often ploughed up, and numerous small workings developed. Pits developed throughout the Manor, with those in Swanwick and Alfreton being the most productive. Alfreton colliery was sited to the northeast of the town. Ropemaking was allied to this industry, and the locality became famous for the quality of its ropes. In the 18th century Alfreton was the chief coal mining centre in Derbyshire, and the third-largest town in the county. The pits closed in the late 1960s and their sites have been reclaimed for other development.

Local iron working began in the low-lying land to the south of the current town in the vicinity of the A61, where a dam was made to power a water mill. This would have been quite a small operation, along with another at Lower Birchwood, and it was not until the 18th century that iron working was expanded into major enterprises, centred on Riddings and Butterley, south and southeast of the manor.

The growth of these industries grounded the area's prosperity and attracted huge numbers of workers in the 19th century, rapidly swelling the local population. The extensive brick terraced housing in the area dates to this period, and brickmaking and tilemaking were significant local industries. Bootmaking and repairing, and tanning of leather, were also substantial employers due to the need for footwear for these heavy industries. According to census figures, in 1801 the population of the area that would become the Urban District stood at 2,301, rising to 21,232 in 1931. It has remained within about 3,000 of that number ever since.

After the closure of the pits and Riddings Ironworks in the 1960s, local employment shifted to factory, retail, and service enterprises, many of which grew up on industrial estates occupying formerly despoiled colliery lands. Initially only a few major employers were present, such as Aertex and English Rose, but this changed with the development of several industrial estates to the east of the town.

The development of transport in the area followed much the same pattern as elsewhere in England, with roads being vastly improved by turnpiking from the late 18th century onwards. Turnpike Acts affecting the area were obtained in 1759, 1764 (amended in 1790 and 1812), 1786, and 1802. These provided Alfreton with good road links to Derby, Nottingham, Mansfield, Chesterfield, and the High Peak. The town became a coaching centre, which accounts for the inordinate number of inns that were formerly in the vicinity of the market place. A legal requirement on turnpike companies to provide milestones resulted in a local curiosity, a cast-iron marker on the town crossroads with the notation 'Alfreton 0 Miles'. Around the same time as turnpikes were introduced the coal and iron industries benefited from the building of canals in the southern and eastern parts of the area. The Cromford Canal, built in 1793, had a 3,000-yard-long tunnel. In the 19th century, coaching and canal transport were rendered increasingly obsolete by railways built to the east of the town and along the eastern and southern boundaries of the former manor. As canals fell into disuse, road and rail transport burgeoned. Rail transport temporarily declined in the 1960s when Alfreton station was closed due to the Beeching cuts, before being reopened in May 1973.

Alfreton Hall, the successor to the original manor house, was built c. 1750, with an additional wing added c. 1850; it is now a conference centre and restaurant. Alfreton House just off the High Street dates from c. 1650 and is now occupied by the Town Council. The former George Inn at the top of King Street dates back to the 18th century and was used as the meeting place for the local Turnpike Trust and local Assizes. On the west side of the southern approach to Alfreton is a small and distinctive stone-roofed building known as the 'House of Confinement'. This was built in the 1840s and was the local jail. There are also several churches, the oldest of which is St. Martin's at the west end of the town, part of which dates back to 1200. Beyond the town but within the ancient Manor are Carnfield Hall (15th century, now a private residence and events venue), Riddings House (now a nursing home), Swanwick Hall (c. 1772, now a school), Swanwick Old Hall (1678, private residence), The Hayes (c. 1860, now a conference centre), Newlands House (19th century, now flats), and the Jessop Monument (1854) at Ironville.

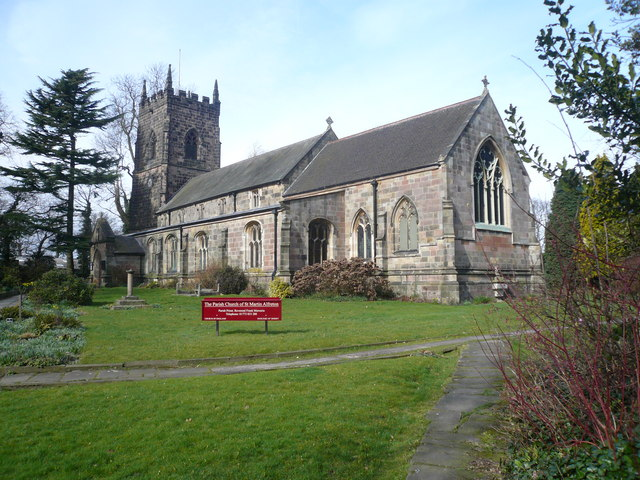
St Martin's Church in 2008

== Economy ==
The main industry of Alfreton was historically coal mining but after the mines closed in the 1960s it changed to light industry, warehousing, retailing, and the service sector. A substantial proportion of local jobs are in health, education, and leisure. A significant but declining proportion of the area is still agricultural. Alfreton town centre features a number of national chain stores, along with independent businesses and charity shops, but it is dominated by a large branch of Tesco. There are several banks, building societies, estate agents, and other services. There is an indoor market, library, two post offices, a job centre, and numerous pubs and food outlets. There is a health centre, a leisure centre, swimming pool and park at the west end of the town, and a golf course outside the town to the west.

The chocolate company Thorntons, women's fashion company David Nieper and safety footwear manufacturer Rock Fall are based in Alfreton. Margaret Miles-Bramwell started Slimming World here and it, in time, employed 500 people.

== Transport ==
=== Road ===
The area has a heavily used and extensive road network, in particular the arterial A61 and A38, the latter linking to the nearby junction 28 of the M1 motorway. The town grew as a centre for bus transport throughout the 20th century and still has extensive bus services.

The A38 bypass, to the south, from Alfreton to M1, opened as the A615. It was built by Robert McGregor & Sons from October 1967 for £1,473,341. It was Derbyshire's largest road project. It took up 29 acres of land in Pinxton. The A61 Swanwick–Alfreton diversion had not been built, but an elevated roundabout was built at this junction. The bypass was built as a concrete road.

The bypass opened on 27 August 1969, four months early. It was opened with a cavalcade of historic vehicles, including a horse and carriage, a 1907 Rolls-Royce Silver Ghost, several high-performance cars including the Le Mans twice-winner Ford GT40, the James Bond Aston Martin DB5 and Chitty Chitty Bang Bang (car) (named 'Dalkeith'), built by Alan Mann Racing. The GT40 approached 200 mph. The bypass was 3.3 miles, and cost £2m.

=== Railway ===
Alfreton railway station, sited northeast of the town, was originally closed in 1967 as part of the Beeching cuts, but in 1973 a station was opened on the same site named Alfreton and Mansfield Parkway, as the nearby town of Mansfield did not have its own station at this time. When Mansfield regained its own station as part of the Robin Hood Line reopenings in the 1990s, the station's name reverted to Alfreton. From May 2021, the station lost all direct services to and from London, though a campaign to have some reinstated has the support of the Town Council. An hourly service also runs to Liverpool and Norwich, and between Leeds and Nottingham.

== Geography ==
Alfreton is 2.45 miles (3.94 kilometres) from the border with Nottinghamshire and lies near the towns of Kirkby-in-Ashfield 5 miles (8.0 kilometres), Sutton-in-Ashfield 5.09 miles (8.19 kilometres) and Mansfield 8.3 miles (13.4 kilometres). The towns of Clay Cross 4.95 miles (7.97 kilometres) and Ripley 3.38 miles (5.44 kilometres) are also nearby. Chesterfield is 9.66 miles (15.55 kilometres) north of Alfreton.

== Politics ==
Alfreton is part of the Amber Valley constituency; the Member of Parliament (MP) is Linsey Farnsworth (Labour). The local council for Alfreton is Amber Valley Borough Council.

Alfreton is also represented by Alfreton Town Council. The current Mayor is Councillor Hannah Jowett-Frost.

== Education ==
The local secondary school is David Nieper Academy. Before September 2008 the school was known as Mortimer Wilson School for many decades. In September 2017 it became David Nieper Academy, after the clothing line that now owns it.

Schools for children aged 4–6 are Copthorne Infant School and Croft Infant School. Leys Junior School, on Flowery Leys Lane, and Woodbridge Junior school, which shares the Alfreton Grange site on Grange Street, provide for children aged 7–11.

There is also a Roman Catholic school named Christ the King on Firs Avenue, for children 4–11, as well as an adjoining nursery for children 2–4.

== Media ==
Local news and television programmes are provided by BBC East Midlands and BBC Yorkshire on BBC One, and by ITV Central and ITV Yorkshire on ITV1. Television signals are received from either the Waltham or Emley Moor TV transmitters.

Local radio stations are BBC Radio Derby, Smooth East Midlands, Capital East Midlands, Greatest Hits Radio Yorkshire (formerly Peak FM) and Amber Sound FM, a community-based station.

The town's local newspaper is the Derbyshire Times.

== Sport and leisure ==
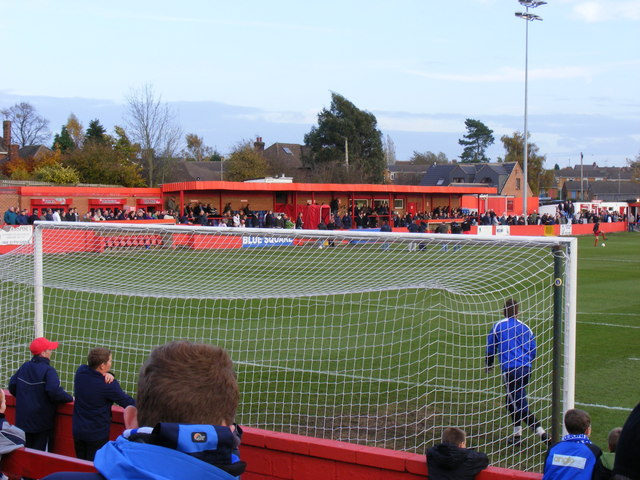
Alfreton Town F.C., 2008

=== Football ===
Alfreton Town's home ground is at The Impact Arena on North Street and they play in the Northern Premier League Premier Division.

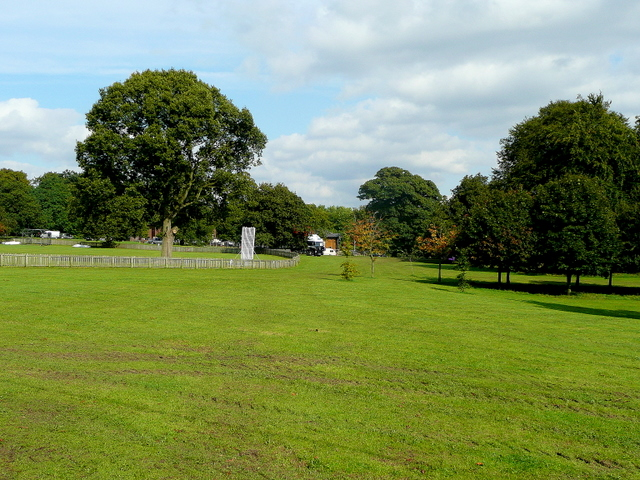
Alfreton Park, 2009

=== Cricket ===
Alfreton Cricket Club is an English amateur cricket club, founded in 1927. The club's ground is in Alfreton Park on Wingfield Road. Alfreton CC have three Saturday senior XI teams that compete in the Derbyshire County Cricket League, a Women's Softball team competing in the East Midlands Women's Cricket League, and a junior training section that play competitive cricket in the Derbyshire Cricket Foundations Competitions.

=== Cycling ===
Alfreton has an active cycling club, organising a full programme of Audax events.

=== Air Training Corps ===
Alfreton is home to 1401 (Alfreton and Ripley) Squadron of the Air Training Corps (ATC).

=== Wrestling ===
Professional wrestling shows were often shown in Alfreton, with British legends such as Big Daddy, Jackie Pallo, and Blackjack Mulligan performing here.

== Notable residents ==
- Benjamin Outram (1764–1805), civil engineer, surveyor and industrialist. He was a pioneer in the building of canals and tramways.
- James Young (1811–1883), a Scottish chemist best known for his method of distilling paraffin from coal and oil shales whilst working locally in 1848. He is often referred to as Paraffin Young.
- William Carter (1830–1918), founded Carter's – The William Carter Company, in Needham, Massachusetts (US). He emigrated to Needham in 1854 and established the factory to produce children's clothing.
- Robert Watchorn (1859–1944), coal miner, union leader, immigration commissioner, businessman, and philanthropist. Emigrated to America aged 22. US Commissioner of Immigration at Ellis Island between 1905 and 1909. He was later a benefactor of Alfreton.
- Frank Varley (1885–1929), coal miner, checkweighman, politician, Labour MP for Mansfield, 1923–1929.
- Roger Sacheverell Coke (1912–1972), composer and pianist from Brookhill Hall, Pinxton.
- Norman Whitehead (1915–1983), a local landscape painter.
- Margaret Miles-Bramwell (1948–2025), founded Slimming World in 1969, grew up and is buried locally.

=== Sport ===
- Sammy Lamb (1879–1960), footballer who played 174 games beginning with Alfreton Town and Derby County.
- George Davis (1881–1969), footballer and coach, who played 134 games for Derby County and 2 for England.
- Freddie Wheatcroft (1882–1917), footballer who played over 230 games beginning with Alfreton Town and Derby County.
- Alf Bentley (1887–1940), footballer who played almost 300 games including 151 for Derby County.
- Shirley Abbott (1889–1947), footballer who played over 270 games including for Chesterfield and Portsmouth.
- Arthur Severn (1893–1949), cricketer who played 13 first-class cricket games for Derbyshire
- Barry Jepson (1929–2001), footballer who played 168 games including 89 for Chester City.
- John Rowland (1941–2020), footballer who played over 250 games including 149 for Port Vale.
- Jacob Whittle (born 2004), freestyle swimmer who competed at the 2020 and the 2024 Summer Olympics.

== See also ==
- Listed buildings in Alfreton
