= Shirley Abbott (footballer) =

English footballer

Personal information
- Full name: Shirley Wray Abbott
- Date of birth: 10 February 1889
- Place of birth: Alfreton, England
- Date of death: 26 September 1947 (aged 58)
- Place of death: Portsmouth, England
- Positions: Wing half; left back

Senior career*
Years	Team	Apps	(Gls)
1906–1910	Alfreton Town		
1910–1911	The Wednesday	0	(0)
1911–1913	Derby County	1	(0)
1913–1923	Portsmouth	155	(8)
1923–1924	Queens Park Rangers	12	(0)
1924–1928	Chesterfield	107	(5)
- * Club domestic league appearances and goals

Shirley Wray Abbott (10 February 1889 – 26 September 1947) was an English professional footballer who captained Chesterfield and Portsmouth in the Football League. A wing half, he also played League football for Queens Park Rangers and Derby County and after his retirement served Chesterfield as first team trainer between 1928 and 1939.

== Personal life ==
Abbott served in the Middlesex and London Regiments during the First World War and ended the war as a sergeant in the Royal Sussex Regiment. During the Second World War, Abbott worked as a dockworker in Portsmouth, where he died of cancer in 1947.

== Career statistics ==
Appearances and goals by club, season and competition
Club	Season	League			FA Cup		Other		Total	
Club	Season	Division	Apps	Goals	Apps	Goals	Apps	Goals	Apps	Goals
Derby County	1911–12	Second Division	1	0	0	0	—		1	0
Portsmouth	1920–21	Third Division South	23	3	0	0	—		23	3
Portsmouth	1921–22	Third Division South	39	0	2	0	—		41	0
Portsmouth	1922–23	Third Division South	34	0	2	0	—		36	0
Portsmouth	Total		96	3	4	0	—		100	3
Queens Park Rangers	1923–24	Third Division South	12	0	0	0	—		12	0
Chesterfield	1924–25	Third Division North	27	1	2	0	3 (Note: 2 appearances in Derbyshire Senior Cup, 1 appearance and 1 goal in Chesterfield Hospital Senior Cup)	1	32	2
Chesterfield	1925–26	Third Division North	41	1	3	0	3 (Note: 1 appearance in Derbyshire Senior Cup, 1 appearance in Chesterfield Hospital Senior Cup, 1 appearance in Wilson Hospital Senior Cup)	0	47	1
Chesterfield	1926–27	Third Division North	30	3	2	0	3	0	35	3
Chesterfield	1927–28	Third Division North	9	0	1	0	0	0	10	0
Chesterfield	Total		107	5	8	0	9	1	124	6
Career total			216	8	12	0	9	1	237	9

== Honours ==
Portsmouth

- Southern League First Division: 1919–20

Chesterfield

- Derbyshire Senior Cup: 1924–25
- Chesterfield Hospital Senior Cup: 1924–25, 1925–26, 1926–27
- Wilson Hospital Senior Cup: 1925–26
