= Heanor and Loscoe =

Civil parish in Derbyshire, England

Coordinates: 53.017°N 1.356°W

- Civil parish
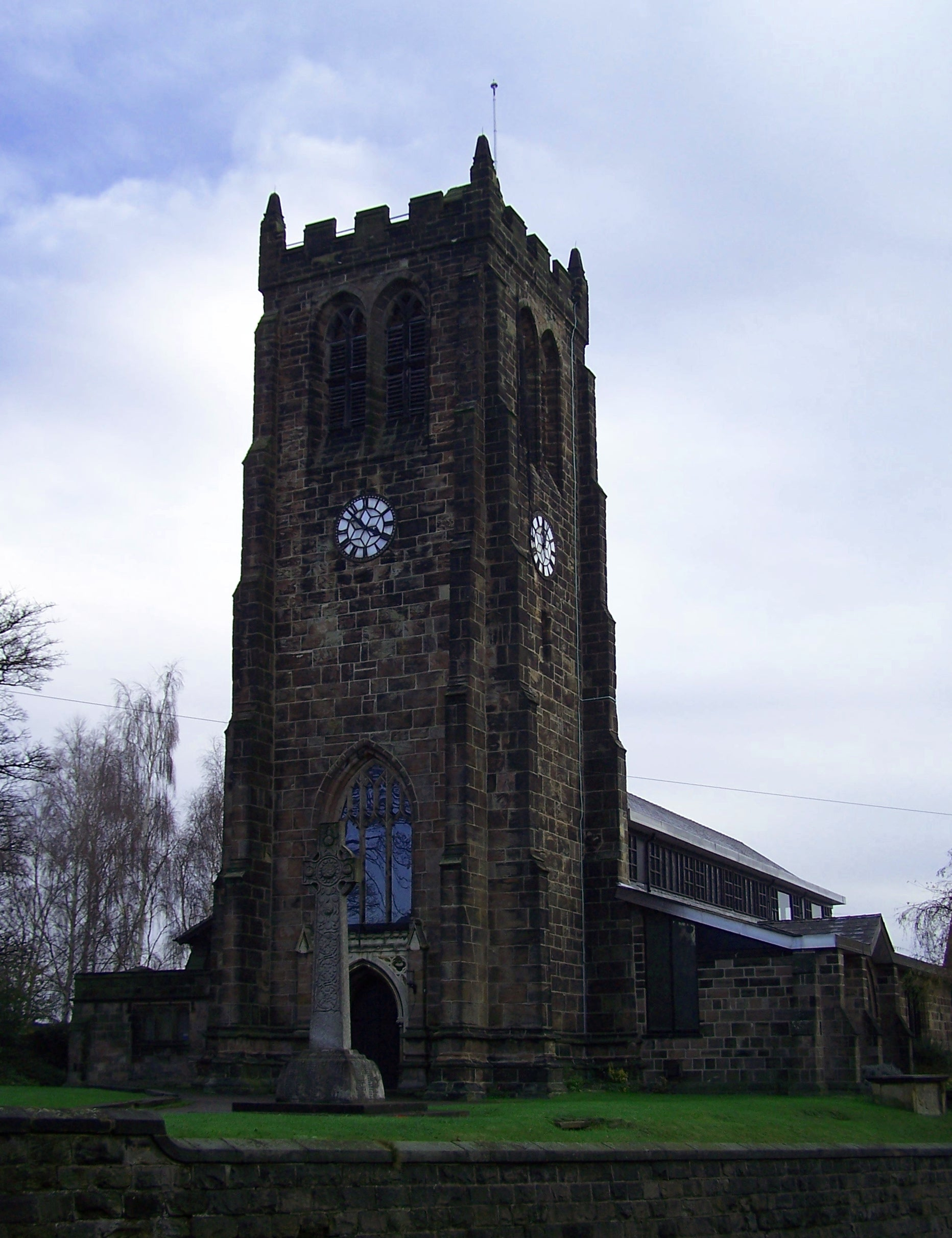
- St Lawrence's Church, Heanor

- Location within Derbyshire
- Interactive map of Heanor and Loscoe
- Area: 2.34 sq mi (6.1 km^{2})
- Population: 17,337 (2021)
  - Density: 7,409/sq mi (2,861/km^{2})
- OS grid reference: SK 4347
  - London: 120 mi (190 km) SE
- District: Amber Valley
- Shire county: Derbyshire
- Region: East Midlands
- Country: England
- Sovereign state: United Kingdom
- Settlements: Heanor, Loscoe, Marlpool, Langley, Loscoe Grange
- Post town: HEANOR
- Postcode district: DE75
- Dialling code: 01773
- Police: Derbyshire
- Fire: Derbyshire
- Ambulance: East Midlands
- UK Parliament: Amber Valley
- Website: www.heanorloscoetowncouncil.gov.uk

Heanor and Loscoe is a civil parish within the Amber Valley district, which is in the county of Derbyshire, England. Mainly built up with rural fringes, its population was 17,337 during the 2021 census, a small increase from the 17,251 residents of the 2011 census. The parish is 120 miles (190 km) north west of London, 10 miles (16 km) north east of the county city of Derby, and contains the market town of Heanor along with other areas. It shares a boundary with the parishes of Aldercar and Langley Mill, Codnor, Denby, Shipley and Smalley.

== Geography ==
=== Location ===
==== Placement and size ====
Heanor and Loscoe parish is surrounded by the following local Derbyshire places:

- Codnor, Langley Mill and Woodlinkin to the north
- Heanor Gate, Smalley and Shipley to the south
- Eastwood to the east
- Denby to the west.

It is 2.34 square miles (6.1 km^{2}; 610 ha) in area, 1 1/2 miles (2.4 km) in length and 2 miles (3.2 km) in width, within the south western portion of the Erewash district, and is to the south east of the Derbyshire county near its border with Nottinghamshire. The parish is roughly bounded by land features such as the A610 Nottingham to Ripley road to the north, Bailey Brook and the Erewash Valley railway line to the east, Shipley Park to the south, and the Sough Wood to the west.

==== Settlements ====
There are areas of built environment to the bulk of the parish, outside of this being essentially rural fringes and farmland. The main locales are:

- Heanor, a town
- Loscoe and Loscoe Grange, villages
- Marlpool, a suburb of Heanor
- Langley, a suburb of Heanor

===== Heanor =====
This is to the centre south of the parish, and atop a geological ridge. It is the main settled location of the parish, taking up prominence in its title as it is the largest urban area. Heanor maintains primary services such as food stores and hospitality, retail park with medium sized retail offerings and other shops, market, churches, school, industrial estates and the core housing stock for the area. Common Side is a suburb 1/4 mile (0.40 km) to the south west.

===== Loscoe/Loscoe Grange =====
Lying 1 mile (1.6 km) to the north west of Heanor, these are villages which have grown and merged with the town. It is encircled by the adjoining parishes of Codnor and Smalley They are primarily residential or dormitory areas, with some small retail and industrial units amongst. Key buildings and features include a church, nature reserve and several factories.

===== Marlpool =====
This location is 2/3 mile (1.1 km) to the south east of Heanor, here also coalesces into the town, bounded by rural area of Shipley parish, the main thoroughfare is from Ilkeston. It contains a mix of mainly residences with small retail outlets, school, churches and other local services.

===== Langley =====
2/3 mile (1.1 km) to the east of Heanor, this merges into the town and Marlpool and is surrounded by the rural portion of the adjacent Shipley parish. Primarily residential, It contains very few services including limited retail, school and church.

==== Routes ====
The key road through the parish is the A608 road from Annesley in Nottinghamshire to the city of Derby, which cuts through the centre of Heanor. The A6007 road is from Bramcote in Nottinghamshire to Codnor and overlays the A608 through Heanor.

=== Environment ===
==== Landscape ====
The centre of Heanor stands on a high ridge, the surrounding land to the east being noticeably lower as part of the Erewash Valley, except towards the south east by Marlpool and to the west towards Heanor Gate. Many of the roads towards the town are characterised by steep inclines. The parish is primarily urbanised, but has some sporadic greenfield land throughout, particularly recreation areas, along with some farmland on its fringes, this more pronounced surrounding Loscoe. Red River Local Nature Reserve is the only one of its kind within the parish, separating Loscoe and Loscoe Grange. Substantial areas of trees are few, with a small coppice to the north of Bailey Brook, and scattered clusters at Loscoe and Marlpool.

==== Geology ====
Scattered throughout much of the parish and surrounding the River Derwent, the bedrock of the parish consists of mudstones, siltstones and sandstones of various types within the Pennine Middle Coal Measures Formation, formed between 318 and 309.5 million years ago during the Carboniferous period, the ridge at Heanor particularly persistent of the latter, along with Loscoe. Superficial deposits at the Heanor ridge are till, Mid Pleistocene - Diamicton. The wider area has historically been mined for coal and marl. Along the Bailey Brook are clay, silt, sand and gravel alluvium superficial deposits dating from 11.8 thousand years ago to the present during the Quaternary period.

==== Hydrological features ====
Bailey Brook is a subsidiary of the River Erewash, it forms some of the parish north eastern boundary and flows to the east of Loscoe, where the Loscoe Brook joins after flowing through the village. Loscoe Dam is a man made lake which has existed since medieval times and filled by Bailey Brook. Other lakes include Osbourne's Pond to the very south of the parish at Marlpool, along with Red River Local Nature Reserve in Loscoe.

==== Land elevation ====
The centre of the town of Heanor stands on a noticeably high ridge which is in the range of 125–130 metres (410–427 ft). Nearby areas with a similar height include Derby Road to the west of Common Side at Tag Hill, along with Marlpool. Loscoe is in the range of 95–100 metres (312–328 ft), Langley varies from 65–105 metres (213–344 ft), and Loscoe Grange is in the range of 75–120 metres (246–394 ft). The highest point is the far west of Loscoe by the parish boundary in the range of 135 metres (443 ft), the lowest is at Bailey Brook where it meets the A608 road, measuring ~62 metres (203 ft).

== History ==
=== Toponymy ===
Only the settlements of Heanor and Langley were listed in the Domesday 1086 landholding survey. Heanor was described in it as Hainoure, which was thought to mean ‘The high ridge’ in reference to its elevation. Langley was Langeleie and stood for 'long clearing'. Loscoe was recorded by the late 13th century as Loftskou, Loscowe or Loskowe in various texts and meant 'wood with a loft (house)'. Common Side was derived from Heanor Common and was first noted in the 17th century. Marlpool was a much later addition in the early 19th century, with suggestions marl was shallow mined alongside the Heanor-Ilkeston road and the resulting hole filling with rainwater.

=== Prehistory to modern times ===
The parish holds very little proof of its prehistoric past, with relics from that era recorded mainly in the surrounding area just outside the boundary, although a stone axe was found at Marlpool in 1953, and much of these dating from the Neolithic to Late Bronze Age (4000 BC to 701 BC). The location formed part of the southern boundary of Sherwood Forest, and the high ground offered good vantage points for defence from approaches and attacks. It is thought the earliest settlements, built of wattle and daub were located around the area of the present day Heanor Market Place. There is evidence of a Roman presence in the area with contemporary discoveries of Roman artefacts, and with Ryknield Street, a primary Roman road running less than two miles to the west, suggests that the parish may have had part of the Roman road system through it. Later Anglo-Saxons were the main settlers of the area, with local town and village names being derived from their influence. Heanor in particular because of its strategic location became a centre for the area and became more developed than its surroundings, certainly by the time of the Norman Conquest, with it being recorded in the Domesday Book of 1086 as having a church. It was associated to the manor of Codnor which was held by Warner, the local lord who paid tax to the tenant-in-chief, William Peverel. The manor was granted by the early 13th century to Henry de Grey, early ancestor in the House of Grey; Codnor Castle became their seat, they used a number of local bowmen during the battles of Crecy and Agincourt. After Henry, the last Lord Grey of Codnor, died in the early 16th century the Codnor estate passed to John la Zouche. Sold on by the family in 1634, to Archbishop of York Richard Neile and his son Sir Paul Neile, later descendants sold the manor and castle in 1692, to Sir Streynsham Master, who was High Sheriff of Derbyshire in 1712. Descendant Charles Legh Hoskins Masters was Lord of the manor by the 1850s, however the parish was described in trade directories as being freehold and in the hands of several landowners, especially after enclosure activities in 1792.

Loscoe was associated to the Draycott family, with records showing Richard and William De Draycott at Loscoe in 1401. Loscoe Manor was their seat, it was demolished in 1704. The associated Grange Farm continued through to the 1960s when it was cleared and a food processing plant built. Henry Garnet, a protagonist in the 1605 Gunpower Plot was born in Heanor. The Fletchers were a notable family in the wider region and owned several coalmines in the 17th century, they resided in Heanor Hall which was built in the period, it was bought by the Suttons and through inheritance came to the Ray family, both of whom also had mining interests. The estate was bought by the Mundy family of Shipley Hall and split up by the 1880s, the parkland donated to the town to become the Market Place in 1894 and the then economic centre at Tag Hill on Derby Road losing custom as a result. The town had begun to see some focus towards the church with some buildings being erected alongside, particularly the Heanor Town Hall in 1867, which for a time was also a movie theatre. Heanor Hall became a secondary school, Heanor Grammar, opening in 1893 until it was demolished in 1910 and rebuilt in 1912. In 1976 it became a campus for the South East Derbyshire College, and after further reorganisation, Derby College before being mothballed in 2013. The Ripley & Heanor News title started in 1889 as a Ripley-only newspaper, but in 1890 was renamed Ripley and Heanor News and Ilkeston Division Free Press, after a relaunch in 1977 its regularised name was used from 1979 until 2021 when it was merged into the Derbyshire Times. A school was built in 1895 at Loscoe to cater for boys and girls of infant age. It closed in 2003, with the opening of a new primary school. Calladine House was an isolation hospital to the south of Loscoe Grange until the early 1900s. Heanor Memorial Hospital was a dedication to fallen World War I locals, it was constructed in 1925. It was rebuilt in 2018 as a medical centre after asbestos was found. A methane gas explosion from landfill waste occurred at a Loscoe bungalow in 1986, and led to new UK laws on landfill gas migration and gas protection.

=== Governance ===
Heanor was in medieval times an ancient parish within the Morleyston and Litchurch hundred, with local affairs being run by their vestry in conjunction with the manor of Codnor and local courts or justices. It was a sprawling area, encompassing Heanor, Codnor, Codnor Castle and Park, Shipley, Langley, Langley Mill, Loscoe, Milnhay and Shipley Wood. Loscoe was within the parish of Heanor until 1844, and along with the Codnor areas, became a standalone parish after St. James’s Church at Cross Hill, in-between the two villages, was built. The remaining parish area of Heanor created under Public Health Act 1848 legislation a local board of health in 1850 to govern the public infrastructure of the town, this reformed into a sanitary district gaining additional powers. With the Local Government Act 1894, Codnor Park and Shipley were made independent civil parishes, and the board's area became an urban district in 1895. In 1899 Heanor Urban District was extended with the reabsorption of the parish of Codnor and Loscoe. The district used the town hall as their headquarters. It was then merged into the new non-metropolitan district of Amber Valley by the Local Government Act 1972 in 1974. The former area of the urban district at first was an unparished area. Ten years later in 1984 following a referendum, it was divided between three new civil parishes, Aldercar and Langley Mill, Codnor, and Heanor and Loscoe. In 1987 Heanor and Loscoe parish council voted to reconstitute the parish as a town under the 1972 Act, creating a town council.

=== Economy ===
Industry during medieval times included the establishment of Loscoe Dam by the Greys, first noted at the start of the 14th century in county records and used to run a corn mill and to provide a supply of fish to the family. In the late 16th century the waters powered an iron works built by the Zouches, the road over the dam still called Furnace Road. By the middle 1800s it was described in sale documents once again as a corn mill, and the land to the south later being taken over by Ormonde Colliery from 1908 until 1970. A further site between Loscoe and Loscoe Grange was known since the 12th century as Egreaves which had a dam and ponds. It was developed from the later 18th century to serve as a water powered source for Shelton's Mill, used to refine corn and was inherited in that period by the Wooley family. Heanor Hall parkland where the modern day market place is, once hosted a colliery. Loscoe Colliery was sunk in the 1830s, it operated across from the Loscoe corn mill, the Wooleys selling up to the proprietors of the mine in the late 1920s, who were by then the Butterley Company. The family later sold Egreaves House to allow the company to mine in the area. Butterley also owned New Winnings colliery which was opened in 1859 and renamed New Langley after a pause in operations for four years due to a lack of demand until 1891. The business also owned Bailey Brook colliery and together the four were known as the New Langley group of collieries, until coal nationalisation after WWII. Manufacturing premises included silk and lace factories towards Heanor Gate, brickworks at Heanor and Loscoe, and pottery works at Heanor.

=== Religion ===
==== Church of England ====
The first church at Heanor existed before the time of Domesday and little is known of this building, during the 12th century it was a chapel to a parent church, St Mary's in Derby and to Dale Abbey in 1473. A new church was opened in 1297, it was at first dedicated to St Michael until at least the 16th century. At some point after this it was rededicated to St Lawrence, trade directories between 1895 and 1912 reporting this change. In 1868 the chancel and nave were rebuilt, the tower being left intact. In 1981, another major rebuild took place, and again only the tower was left as before. Loscoe was separated from Heanor in 1844 and merged with Codnor, the parish church, St James being based at Cross Hill between the two villages. In 1927, Loscoe was made a separate ecclesiastical parish, and services were held at a mission church until 1936-7 when St. Luke's was built. All Saints church was first built in 1895 also initially as a mission church to cater for the Marlpool and Langley population.

==== Other denominations ====
Loscoe was an early non-conformist centre, opening a Presbyterian chapel in 1722 under a former All Saints' Church, Breadsall rector, John Hieron, with a dated foundation stone attributed to Francis Tantum, a local clockmaker of some regard who was related to Mary Howitt, a local poet. It later lessened in usage and was eventually shared with and later passed to a Baptist group with the first minister appointed in 1784. Methodists began worshipping from 1810 in Heanor and other congregations met elsewhere in the area such as the Independents in Marlpool from 1821 and Quakers/Society of Friends from 1834 in Heanor, amongst other denominations and Sunday schools. Marlpool cemetery was established in 1858 and in the grounds are a pair of mortuary chapels.

=== Transport ===
The Midland Railway built a line in 1890 from Ripley avoiding the Heanor ridge and instead paralleling the Bailey Brook within the valley to Heanor railway station, which was to the north of the town. In 1895 it was linked to the main Midland line at Langley Mill. Separately, a branch was built by the Great Northern Railway (GNR) in 1891, and a terminus to the west of the town was also called Heanor station, although it was referred to locally as Heanor Gate to help distinguish the two. Marlpool station opened on the GNR south of the village and outside the boundary in Shipley parish, also in 1891. All had closed by 1963. Nottinghamshire and Derbyshire Tramways Company opened a tramway from Nottingham to Ripley in 1913, this came from Langley Mill to Heanor, then through Loscoe, its depot was located on the Heanor side of Bailey Brook which was eventually shared with their bus company, Midland General Omnibus Company. The tram service was stopped in 1933, the depot eventually passing through mergers to become the headquarters of the Trent Barton bus company. The Yourbus company had a depot in Heanor during 2009, but ceased operations in 2019.

== Governance ==
=== Local bodies ===
Heanor and Loscoe parish is managed at the first level of public administration through a town council.

At district level, the wider area is overseen by Amber Valley Borough council. Derbyshire County Council provides the highest level strategic services locally.

=== Electoral representation ===
For electoral purposes, the parish is divided into the Heanor and Loscoe, Heanor West and Heanor East wards of the Amber Valley district, is split between the Heanor Central and Greater Heanor electoral divisions for Derbyshire county elections; and within the Amber Valley parliamentary constituency.

== Demographics ==
=== Population ===
There are 17,337 residents reported within Heanor and Loscoe parish for the 2021 census, a small increase (0.5%) from the 17,251 residents of the 2011 census, which was an increase from 16,040 (7.5%) of the 2001 census. 2011 statistics show that the population majority is mainly working age adults, with the 18-64 years age bracket taking up 62%. Infants to teenage years are another sizeable grouping of around 21%, with elderly residents (65 years and older) making up a smaller number (17%) of the parish population.

=== Labour market ===
Data from the 2011 census shows a substantial number of 18 years old locals and above are in some way performing regular work, with 69.7% classed as economically active. 30.3% are economically inactive, of which 15.9% are reported as retired. A majority of residents' occupations are in manufacturing, retail trade and repair of motor vehicles and motor cycles, construction, health and social work activities (59%).

=== Housing and mobility ===
Over 7,200 residences exist throughout the parish in 2011. The majority of housing stock is of the semi-detached type (38%), then detached (28%) or terraced (27%) and the remainder comprising flats, maisonettes or apartments or caravans (7%). The large majority of these (>5,200) are owner occupied, with other tenure including shared ownership, social and private rentals. The majority of households (76%) report having the use of a car or van.

== Education ==
There are a number of nursery and primary schools:

- Heanor and Loscoe Grange - Howitt Primary
- Loscoe - Loscoe Church of England (CofE) Primary and nursery
- Marlpool - Coppice Primary, Mundy CofE Juniors, Marlpool Juniors
- Langley - Laceyfields Academy
- A secondary school, Heanor Gate Science College, is based west of the boundary in the adjacent Smalley parish.

== Community and leisure ==
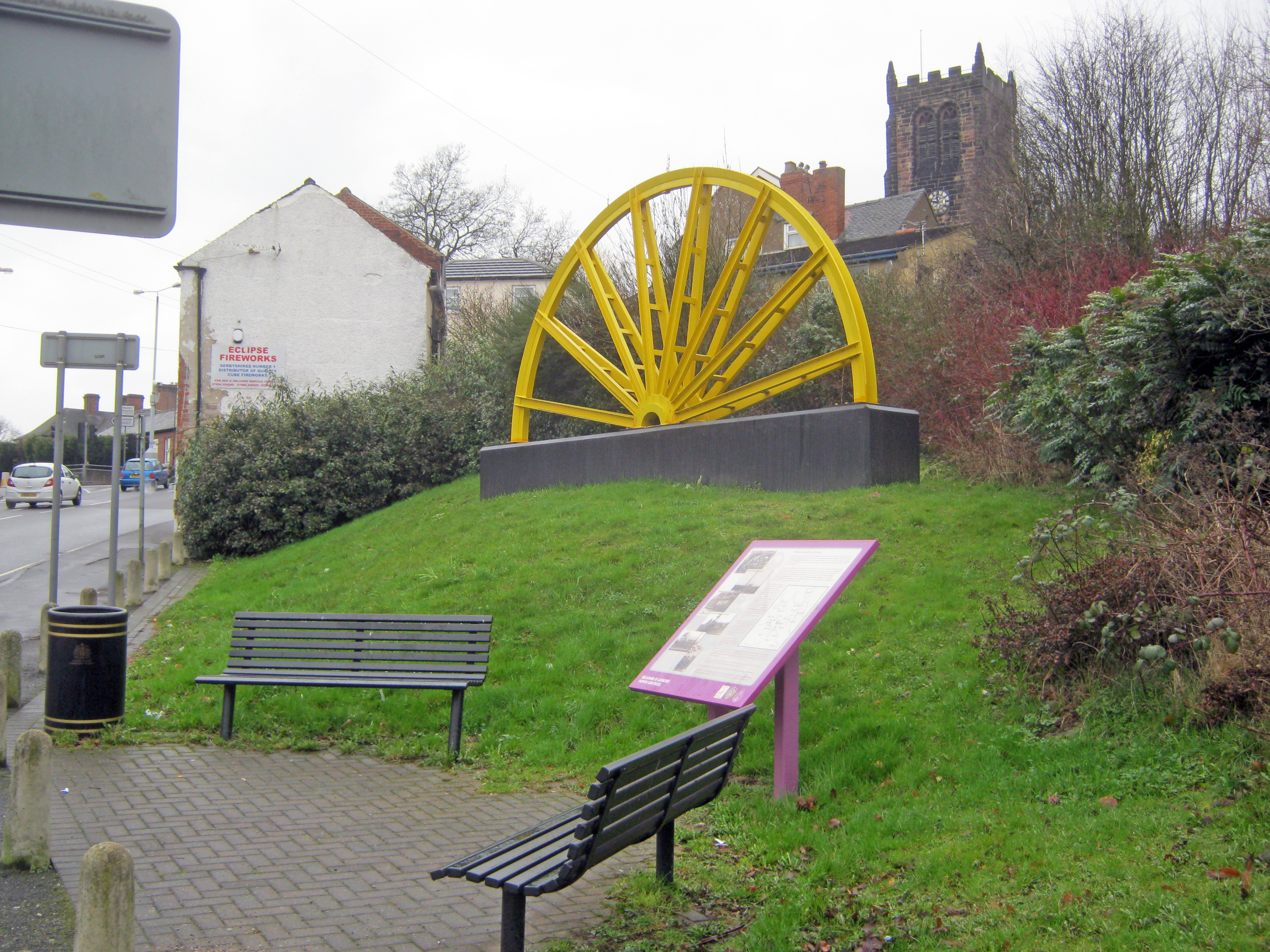
Heanor mining memorial

=== Amenities and local economy ===
The parish has a number of publicly accessible facilities and commercial business activities, overwhelmingly based at Heanor. These include fresh food outlets, grocery stores, retail park, medical centre and public houses. Industrial locations include an area of small and medium sized units between Heanor and Loscoe, the Trent Barton bus depot by Bailey Brook near Langley Mill, Derby Road Industrial Estate hosting smaller businesses and a small area crossing over from the Heanor Gate Industrial Park, which is predominantly in Smalley parish.

=== Events and community groups ===
Heanor and Loscoe council arrange various events such as annual May Day celebrations, band concert, pantomime and Christmas lights festivities. Wilmot Street Centre at Heanor is a community-owned building used for local groups and activities.

=== Recreation ===
The town hosts a number of recreation grounds and playing fields as well as the Red River Nature Reserve at Loscoe and a memorial park at Heanor. There are a large number of play areas for children and young people throughout the parish. Further places for leisure and activities including civic spaces and green corridors. There are community allotment spaces at Loscoe and Marlpool.

=== Tourism ===
The Nutbrook Trail (named after the Nutbrook Canal) is a 10-mile (16 km) traffic-free path between Long Eaton, Shipley Country Park and Heanor. lt briefly encroaches the parish south of Marlpool, reusing the redundant Great Northern railway line before exiting and ending at Heanor Gate. It is also a segment for the 124-mile (200 km) Route 67 of the National Cycle Network between Leicestershire and North Yorkshire.

== Landmarks ==
=== Conservation ===
==== Structural protections ====
===== Listed buildings =====
There are ten items of national architectural merit throughout the parish, St Lawrence's Church at Heanor holds a statutory designation of Grade II*, the rest have Grade II listed status, and comprises varied features such a number of houses, former bank, town hall, former college, and a cemetery monument.

==== Environmental designations ====
===== Green belt =====
The parish, except for the built up area which takes up a majority, is within the South East Derbyshire green belt, which is a component of the wider Nottingham and Derby green belt.

===== Local reserves =====
The area of broadleaved wet woodland alongside Bailey Brook Marsh and north of Heanor is designated as a Local Wildlife Site. which is a non-statutory categorisation used to identify high quality sites in counties, it does not confer any legal restrictions; however, it is a core consideration in planning matters. There is one further non-statutory site, Red River Local Nature Reserve, at Loscoe.

=== War memorials ===
There are several monument items throughout the parish commemorating local personnel who served in the World War I and WWII conflicts:

- William Gregg VC Leisure Centre - dedicated to a locally born soldier who earned the Victoria Cross for their gallant actions
- A WWI memorial tablet, also commemorating William Gregg, in Heanor Cemetery, Marlpool, Derbyshire
- A memorial tablet commemorating William Gregg, in Heanor Park
- Heanor Memorial Health Centre, hosting several plaques
- Dedication boards at the Town Hall
- Artefacts at St Lawrence's Church
- Memorial WWI benches in the Heanor Memorial Park and Red River Nature Reserve.

== Transport ==
=== Bus services ===
Heanor centre is relatively accessible by public transport, being a key interchange point for the parish, the town centre containing seven bus stops. Services travel between Heanor and Chesterfield, Derby, Nottingham, Mansfield and Ripley, amongst others. The Rainbow One bus route operated by Trent Barton runs between Nottingham and Ripley along the A6005 road. It is a scheduled route, with buses on half hour intervals on weekdays and Saturdays, with some longer periods between services on Sundays and bank holidays. The H1 route runs between Alfreton and Derby via Heanor and Loscoe, operated also by Trent Barton, with a similar schedule.

=== Train services ===
There is no railway station within the parish although the Erewash Valley railway line borders the parish to the east of Langley. Along this railway route, Langley Mill railway station is located approximately 1.8 miles (2.9 km) east of Heanor centre.

== Religious sites ==
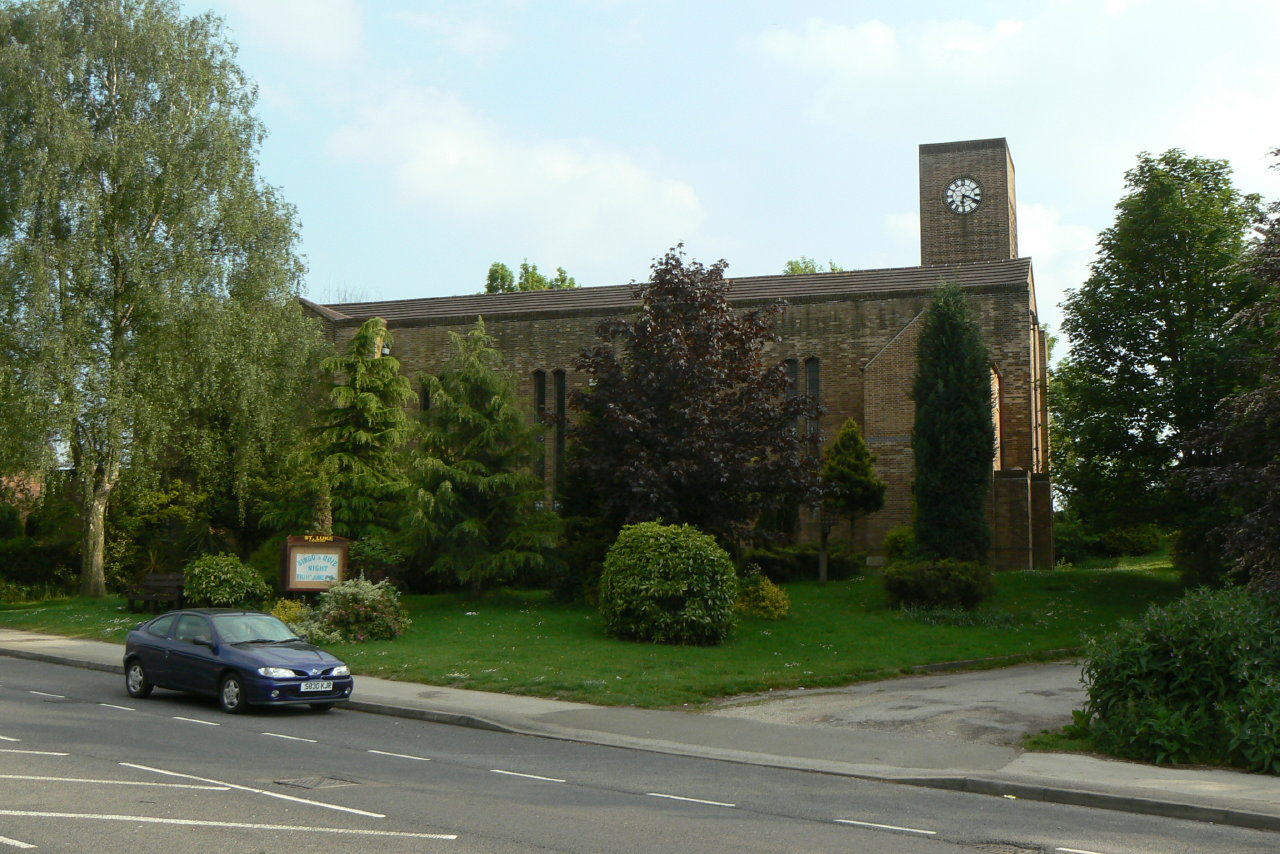
St Luke's, Loscoe

Of the established state church, there are three Anglican places of worship, St Lawrence's at Heanor dates from the 13th century and is atop the highest point within Heanor. St Luke's Church is in Loscoe and All Saints is in Marlpool. Several other denominations are dotted throughout the parish, including Baptists, Christadelphians, United Reformists, Methodists, Jehovah Witnesses and others. A cemetery is based at Marlpool.

== Sport ==
William Gregg VC Leisure Centre is a multi-use sports hall, gym and recreation centre based at Heanor.

The Town Ground in Common Side to the south of Heanor hosts a cricket and football field. Nearby is the Lockton Avenue playing fields. Also in the area are the Miner's Welfare bowling green and football field.

Charles Hill Recreation Ground in Loscoe is an all-weather multi-use games facility for a range of sports, including football, cricket, basketball and wheelchair friendly activities.

Heanor Town are an association football team who are in the United Counties League and play at the Town Ground.

== External sites ==
- Rights of way in Heanor and Loscoe
- Community gallery
- Heanor video journal #1
- Heanor video journal #2
