= Bissill =

Bissill is a surname. Notable people with the surname include:

- George Bissill (1896–1973), British miner, painter, and furniture designer
- Richard Bissill, British French horn player, composer, and arranger
