= Samuel Roper =

Samuel or Sam Roper may refer to:

- Samuel Roper (antiquary) (died 1658), English antiquary
- Samuel Roper (Klansman) (1895–1986), American leader of the Ku Klux Klan after 1946
- Sam Roper, a circus owner whose sideshow included "Elephant Man", Joseph Merrick
- Samuel Phelps-Roper, oldest son of Shirley Phelps-Roper, member of the Westboro Baptist Church
