= Listed buildings in Heanor and Loscoe =

Heanor and Loscoe is a civil parish in the Amber Valley district of Derbyshire, England. The parish contains ten listed buildings that are recorded in the National Heritage List for England. Of these, one is listed at Grade II*, the middle of the three grades, and the others are at Grade II, the lowest grade. The parish contains the town of Heanor and the area of Loscoe to the north. The listed buildings consist of houses, a church, a barn, a public house, a monument in a cemetery, a former town hall, a former bank, and a school.

== Key ==
Grade	Criteria
II*	Particularly important buildings of more than special interest
II	Buildings of national importance and special interest

== Buildings ==
Name and location	Photograph	Date	Notes	Grade
St Lawrence's Church, Heanor; 53.01353°N 1.35188°W		15th century	The oldest part of the church is the tower, the rest of the church was rebuilt in 1867–78, and further alterations were made to the east end and south aisle in 1981. The church is built in stone with a roof of asbestos slate, and consists of a nave with a clerestory, north and south aisles, a northwest vestry, and a west tower. The tower has three stages, angle buttresses, a moulded plinth, a west doorway with a pointed moulded arch, a diaperwork frieze with an embattled top and gableted pilasters, and a three-light window. In the middle stage are clock faces, and the top stage has two-light bell openings, a coved eaves band, and an embattled parapet with corner crocketed pinnacles. The south clerestory contains re-set Victorian glass.	II*
8 Market Place, Heanor; 53.01393°N 1.35248°W	—	Late 17th to early 18th century (probable)	A red brick house incorporating earlier material, with string courses, coped parapets, and a tile roof. There are two storeys, three bays, and a later single-story extension to the east. All the windows are small-pane casements, and there is a 19th-century dormer with shaped bargeboards. In the gable end facing the road is a bay window.	II
21 High Street and railings, Loscoe; 53.02724°N 1.37265°W	—	1766	The house is in pebbledashed brick on a plinth, with painted stone dressings, a floor band, an eaves band, and a red tile roof. There are two storeys and three bays. Above the central doorway is a circular window with a moulded surround, and the other windows are cross casements. All the openings have wedge lintels with incised voussoirs, and double keystones. Attached to the front of the house are iron railings with arrow finials.	II
Barn behind 21 High Street, Loscoe; 53.02709°N 1.37293°W	—	Late 18th century	The barn with stables and a loft is in red brick, and has a tile roof with coped gables. It contains a stable door, windows and slit vents.	II
90 and 92 Derby Road, Heanor; 53.01293°N 1.36172°W	—	Early 19th century	A pair of houses, one later a shop, in red brick with stone dressings, dentilled eaves bands, and a slate roof. There are three storeys, and each house has two bays. In the ground floor of No. 92 is a shop front, and No. 90 has a central doorway with a fanlight. The windows are sashes, and al the openings have wedge lintels.	II
Butchers Arms; 53.01276°N 1.34261°W	—	Early 19th century	The public house is in stuccoed brick with a floor band and a moulded timber cornice, the extensions are in red brick, and the roof is slated. The main block has three storeys and three bays, to the left is a single-storey single-bay extension, and to the right is an extension with two storeys and two bays. On the front is a gabled porch, and the windows are sashes.	II
Donavon Monument; 53.00806°N 1.35158°W		c. 1864	The monument in Marlpool Cemetery is to the memory of a local doctor, and is about 8 feet (2.4 m) high with a square plan. It has a stepped square base, a semicircular niche on each side, flanked by clasping Ionic columns. Above is an elaborate entablature, a frieze with honeysuckle decoration, and a fluted urn finial. In the north and south niches are inscribed panels in polished granite.	II
Registry Office; 53.01397°N 1.35383°W		1867	The former town hall is in red brick with some yellow and blue brick, dressings in stone and tile, and a hipped slate roof. It is in Italianate style, and has two storeys and five bays, the middle bay slightly projecting. In the centre is a semicircular doorway with a moulded surround, a yellow brick arch, a hood mould, and impost bands. It is flanked by segmental-headed sash windows, above which is a floor band with an inscribed panel in the centre. The upper floor contains semicircular-headed fixed windows with an impost band and keystones. Above is a cornice and paired gutter brackets interspersed with yellow brick panels.	II
Former Midland Bank; 53.01393°N 1.35360°W		1897	The former bank is in red brick on a stone plinth, with dressings in brick and stone, string courses, and a roof of Westmorland slate. There are two storeys and attics, and a front of four bays. In the left bay is a semicircular-headed doorway with voussoirs, a keystone and a moulded cornice, and above it is a two-storey oriel window with a pyramidal roof. Between the bays and on the corners are pilasters, and the ground floor windows have flat heads. The upper windows are sashes set in segmental arches with alternating brick and stone voussoirs, and with raised panels in the arches. At the top is a gable, stepped on the outer bays, containing a cartouche, and surmounted by a segmental pediment.	II
Southeast Derbyshire College; 53.01270°N 1.35275°W		1912	The school, designed by George H. Widdows, is in red brick with dressings in blue brick and stone, moulded timber cornices, and a hipped tile roof. It consists of a full height hall range with four bays, flanked by projecting two-storey wings with eight bays. In the hall range, the bays contain tall windows, and are separated by pilasters with blue brick quoins. The windows are mullioned and transomed, and above each window is a semicircular-headed dormer containing a circular window. In the centre of the roof is an octagonal bellcote with arcaded sides and a domed copper roof. In the angle between the hall and the windows are canted bays containing Tuscan doorways with pediments.	II
