= Tommy Fletcher (footballer, born 1881) =

English footballer

Personal information
- Full name: Thomas Fletcher
- Date of birth: 15 June 1881
- Place of birth: Heanor, England
- Date of death: 1954 (aged 72–73)
- Position: Inside forward

Senior career*
Years	Team	Apps	(Gls)
1897–1898	Hill's Ivanhoe		
1898–1900	Derby Nomads		
1901–1904	Leicester Fosse	5	(2)
1904	Derby Nomads		
1904–1907	Derby County	33	(8)
1907	Derby Thornhill		
Total		38	(10)
- * Club domestic league appearances and goals

Thomas Fletcher (15 June 1881–1954) was an English footballer who played in the Football League for Derby County and Leicester Fosse.
