= George Robinson (footballer, born 1908) =

English footballer

Personal information
- Full name: George Henry Robinson
- Date of birth: 11 January 1908
- Place of birth: Marlpool, England
- Date of death: 15 January 1963 (aged 55)
- Place of death: Blackheath, London, England
- Height: 5 ft 9 in (1.75 m)
- Position: Inside forward

Senior career*
Years	Team	Apps	(Gls)
1925–1926	Ilkeston Rangers		
1926–1927	Ilkeston United		
1927–1931	Sunderland	31	(8)
1931–1932	Charlton Athletic	40	(5)
1932–1934	Burton Town		
1934–1947	Charlton Athletic	198	(37)
- * Club domestic league appearances and goals

George Henry Robinson (11 January 1908 – 15 January 1963) was an English professional footballer who played as an inside forward for Sunderland and Charlton Athletic
