= Heanor =

Town in Derbyshire, England

Coordinates: 53.014°N 1.354°W

- town
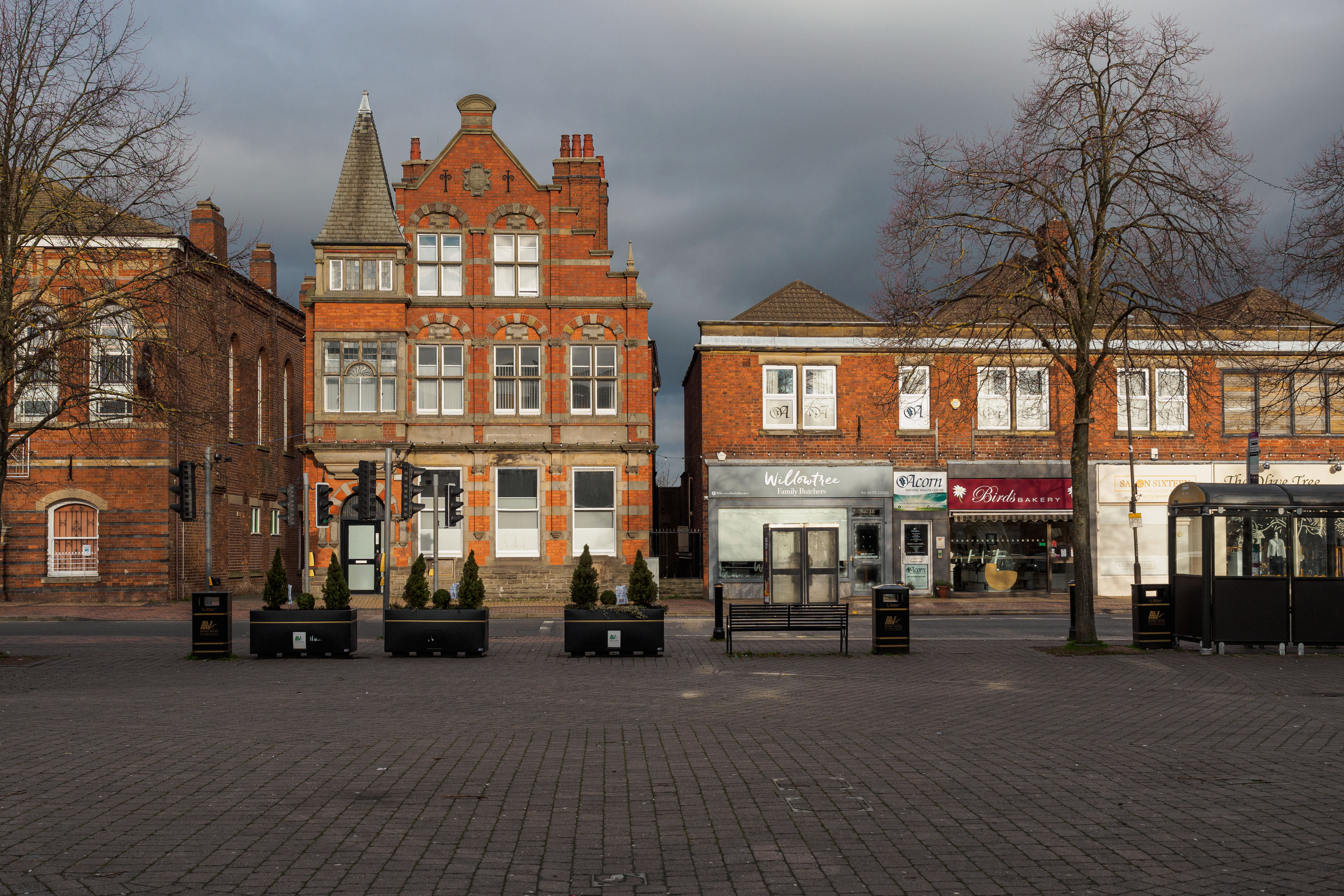
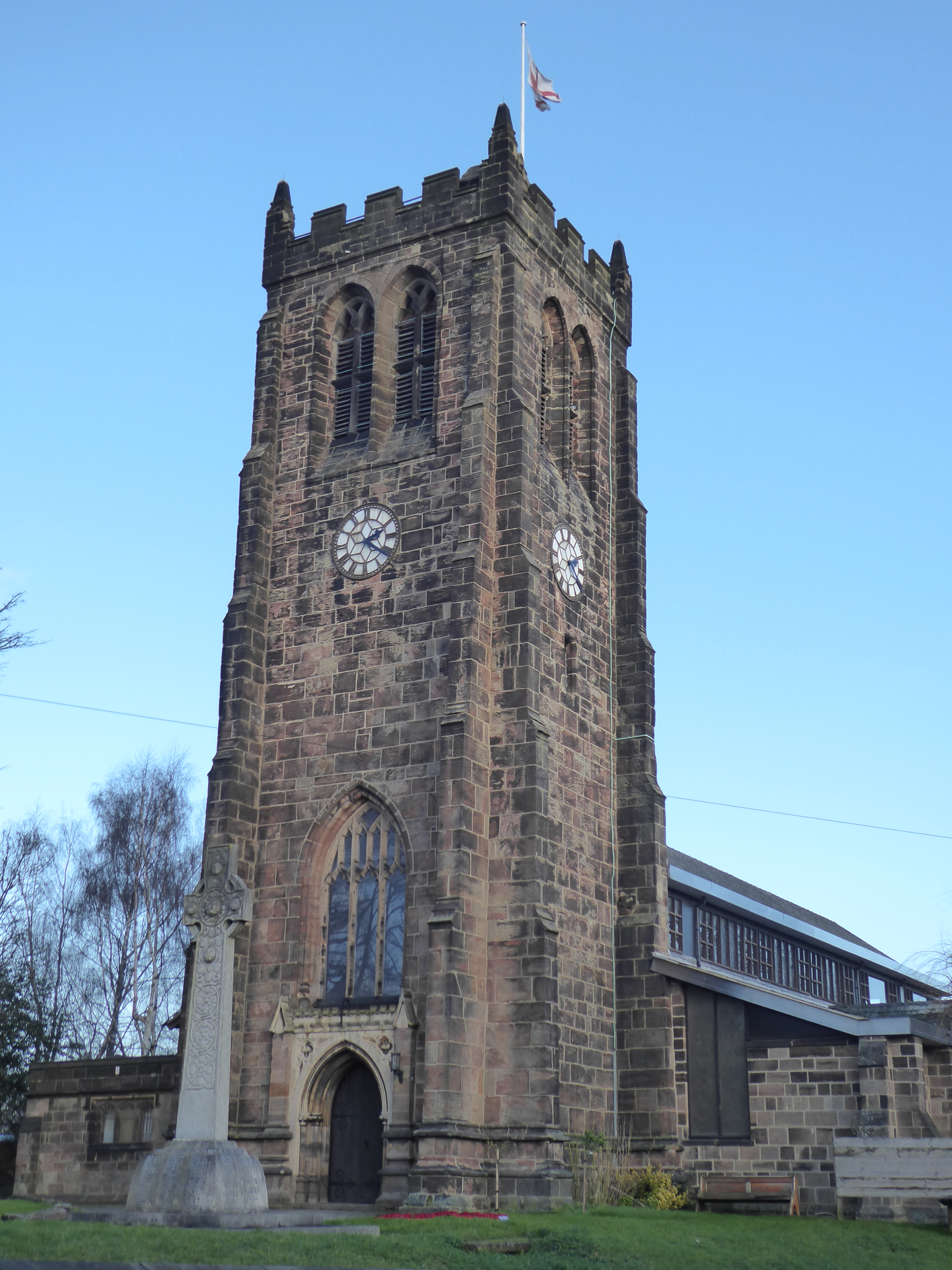
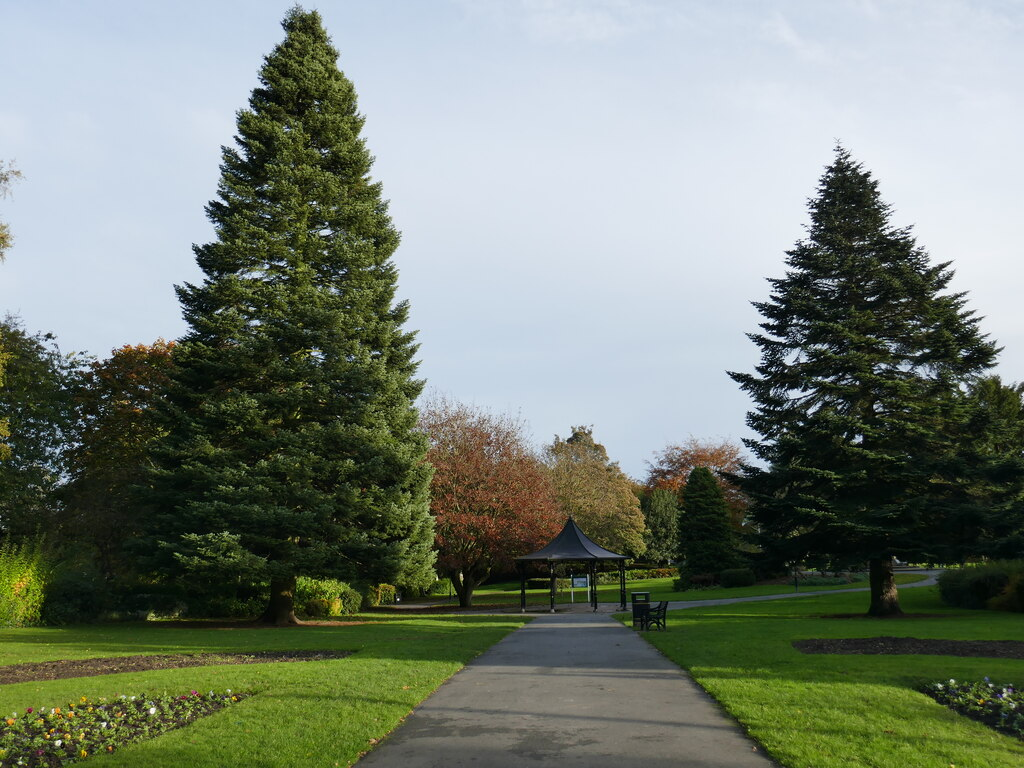
- Market Place St Lawrence Church Memorial Park

- Location within Derbyshire
- Population: 17,251 Whole administrative parish (2011 census)
- OS grid reference: SK 43334 46528
- Civil parish: Heanor and Loscoe
- District: Amber Valley
- Shire county: Derbyshire
- Region: East Midlands
- Country: England
- Sovereign state: United Kingdom
- Areas of the town: List: Heanor Gate; Langley; Loscoe (Village); Marlpool (Village); Shipley (Village); Town Centre
- Post town: HEANOR
- Postcode district: DE75
- Dialling code: 01773
- Police: Derbyshire
- Fire: Derbyshire
- Ambulance: East Midlands
- UK Parliament: Amber Valley

Heanor (/ˈhiːnə/) is a town in the Amber Valley district of Derbyshire, England. It lies 8 miles (13 km) north-east of Derby and forms, with the adjacent village of Loscoe, the civil parish and town council-administered area of Heanor and Loscoe, which had a population of 17,251 in the 2011 census.

== History ==
The name Heanor derives from the Old English hēan (the dative form of hēah) and ofer, and means "[place at] the high ridge". In the Domesday Book of 1086 it was recorded as Hainoure, with its entry stating:

6M In CODNOR and Heanor and Langley [in Heanor] and 'Smithycote' [in Codnor Park] 8 thegns had 7 carucates of land to the geld [before 1066]. [There is] land for as many ploughs. There are now 3 ploughs in demesne, and 11 villains and 2 bordars and 3 sokemen having 5½ ploughs. There is a church and 1 mill [rendering] 12d and 35 acres (140,000 m^{2}) of meadow [and] woodland pasture 2 leagues long and 3 furlongs broad. TRE worth £4 sterling; now 41s 4d [£2.2] per year. Warner holds it.

Samuel Lewis's A Topographical Dictionary of England, published in 1848, states that Heanor parish "abounds with coal and ironstone, both worked extensively, the collieries alone affording employment to more than 2000 persons. The town is pleasantly situated upon an eminence, on the road from Derby to Mansfield. The principal articles of manufacture are silk and cotton goods, hosiery, and bobbinet lace, providing occupation to about 800 persons." The parish then covered 7,000 acres (2,800 ha) and was in the union of Basford and the hundred of Morleston and Litchurch, with Heanor town itself covering 1,500 acres (610 ha) with 3,058 inhabitants. The parish church, dedicated to St Mary, was "a very ancient edifice, with a lofty substantial tower, from which is an extensive view", though the dictionary noted there were also "places of worship for Baptists, Independents, Wesleyans, and Ranters".

Heanor Market Place developed in the 1890s after the break-up of the Heanor Hall estate by the Miller Mundy family of nearby Shipley Hall. The Market Place site had been part of Heanor Hall Park and the main focus of trading activity hitherto Tag Hill.

== Governance ==
=== Civic history ===
The parish of Heanor formed a local board of health in about 1850 to provide services in the town. In 1895, under the Local Government Act 1894, the board's area became an urban district. In 1899 Heanor Urban District was enlarged by the neighbouring parish of Codnor and Loscoe. The urban district remained until 1974, when it became part of a new non-metropolitan district of Amber Valley under the Local Government Act 1972. On 1 April 1974 the parish was abolished and it became an unparished area. In 1961 the parish had a population of 23,870. In 1984 three new civil parishes were created in Amber Valley, Heanor being within the civil parish of Heanor and Loscoe the other two parishes Aldercar and Langley Mill and Codnor). In 1987 Heanor and Loscoe Parish Council resolved to designate the parish a town, (Note: Under section 245 of the 1972 Act) and so it is now governed by a town council headed by a town mayor.

=== Current ===
Since 1984 Heanor has had three tiers of local government: Derbyshire County Council at county level, Amber Valley Borough Council at district level, and Heanor and Loscoe Town Council at parish level. Heanor falls into two single-member electoral divisions of the County Council, Greater Heanor and Heanor Central. Since the 2017 Derbyshire County Council election, both divisions are represented by members of the Conservative Party.

For Amber Valley Borough Council, Heanor and Loscoe civil parish divides into three electoral wards – Heanor East, Heanor West, and Heanor and Loscoe – which each elect two councillors. From 2014 to 2018, all six were from Labour, until the Conservatives narrowly took one seat in both Heanor East and Heanor West at the 2018 local elections, but fell short of taking a seat in Heanor and Loscoe. In the May 2019 local elections, Labour won 13 seats on the town council and the Conservatives 8.

== Geography ==
Measured directly, Heanor town is 8 miles (13 km) north-east of Derby and 9.5 miles (15.3 km) west-north-west of Nottingham. It stands on a hill between 65 metres (213 ft) and 125 metres (410 ft) above sea-level. It lies within the Nottinghamshire, Derbyshire and Yorkshire Coalfield National Character Area as defined by Natural England.

Heanor and Loscoe civil parish includes all Heanor town except Heanor Gate Spencer Academy and a few surrounding streets on the western edge of town (near the road to Smalley), Heanor Gate Industrial Estate to the south west, and a small area of houses on the town's south-eastern fringe near the main road to Ilkeston. The college and surrounding streets and half the industrial estate are in Smalley civil parish, the other areas in Shipley civil parish.

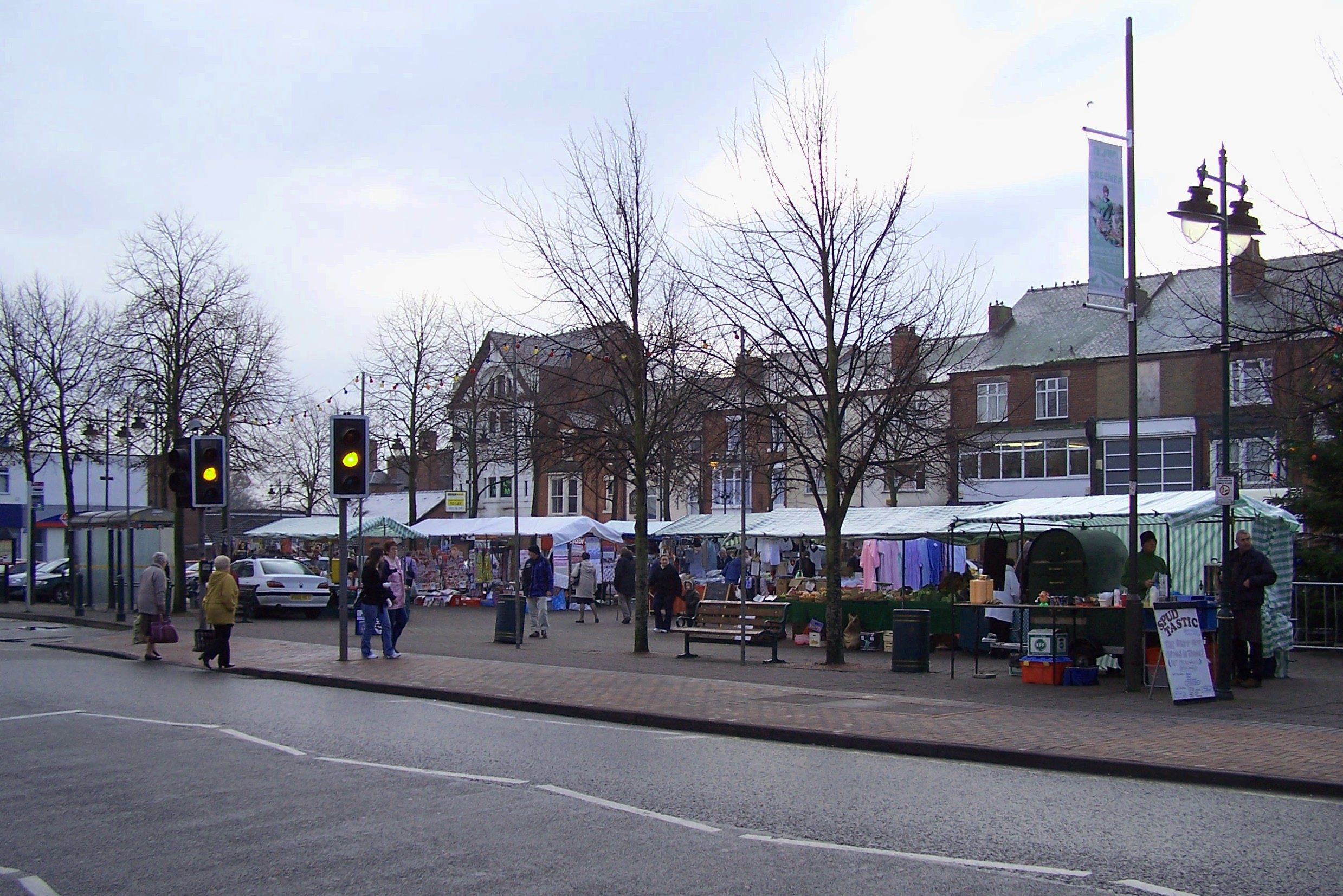
The market place

Heanor and Loscoe civil parish contains no conservation areas, but 30 per cent of the area lies in a green belt. The one nature reserve and four wildlife sites are all of local significance.

== Economy ==
The most important economic sector in the town, employing more than 20 per cent of the working population, is manufacturing, with the retail sector employing over 17 per cent. Coal mining and textiles used to be major industries, but both declined. In December 2013 the unemployment rate was 2.3 per cent in Heanor East and Heanor and Loscoe wards and 3.5 per cent in Heanor West ward. The average for England at the time was 2.8 per cent.

The Matthew Walker factory in Heanor Gate Industrial Park, famous for the production of Christmas puddings, was sold in 1992 to the Northern Foods Group. Other companies on the park include Advanced Composites Group, Cullum Detuners Ltd and Isolated Systems Ltd. In 2011 the 2 Sisters Food Group purchased Northern Foods. The Matthew Walker factory is now a part of the 2 Sisters Chilled Division.

Retail chains with a presence include Tesco, Aldi, and Boyes. A small outdoor market is held on Fridays and Saturdays.

Heanor merges into Langley Mill.

== Demography ==
The 1841 census recorded the population as 3,058 inhabitants.

In the 2011 census Heanor and Loscoe civil parish had 7,512 dwellings, 7,221 households and a population of 17,251. 18.7 per cent of residents were under the age of 16 (compared to 18.9 per cent for England as a whole) and 16.5 per cent of residents were aged 65 or over (compared to 16.4 per cent for England as a whole). Like Amber Valley as a whole, the population was found to be ethnically less diverse than the average for England; 1.84 per cent of residents were of non-white ethnicity (England: 14.58 per cent). Christianity was the most prevalent stated religious affiliation (56.4 per cent; England: 59.4 per cent); 35.6 per cent stated they had no religion (England: 24.7 per cent).

== Education ==
Heanor has two infant schools (Corfield Church of England Infant School and Marlpool Infant School), three primary schools (Coppice Primary School, Howitt Primary Community School and Loscoe Church of England Primary School), two junior schools (Marlpool Junior School and Mundy Church of England Voluntary Controlled Junior School) and one secondary school (Heanor Gate Spencer Academy). Heanor Grammar School, which was just to the east of the market place, was latterly part of Derby College but is currently closed. The site of the former school was purchased from private ownership by Amber Valley Borough Council, with assistance of a Future High Streets Fund grant.

A book on the history of the school was published in 2008.

== Sport and leisure ==
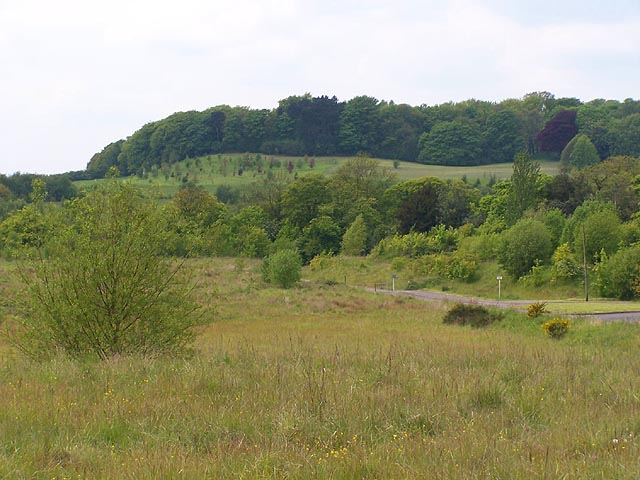
Shipley Hill, part of Shipley Country Park to the south of the town

Shipley Country Park, a steep wooded knoll bordering the south and west of the town, has a riding school and three lakes surrounding it. The park consists of most of the former estate of the Miller-Mundy family, which until the 1920s held Shipley Hall (demolished in the 1940s). It was then sold for intensive open-cast and deep-seam mining by what became the National Coal Board, before being restored and handed to the county council in the 1970s.

The local association football team is Heanor Town Football Club (the Lions). Established in 1883, the club belongs to the United Counties League Premier Division North. Its youth team is called Heanor Juniors. Famous ex-players include Nigel Clough, who went on to play for Nottingham Forest, Liverpool and Manchester City and Nigel Pearson, who captained Sheffield Wednesday to a League Cup win over Manchester United at Wembley. The club shares grounds with Heanor Town Cricket Club.

Heanor Town Cricket Club: The village has a long history of recreational cricket dating back to 1843. In 2003, Heanor Town Cricket Club amalgamated with Stapleford Town Cricket Club, and by 2018 had to move from their original 'Heanor Town Ground' to the Underwood Miners Welfare ground, on Church Lane. Heanor Town CC fields one senior XI team in the Derbyshire County Cricket League.

Heanor Clarion Cycling Club was founded in 1934. The club meet on a Wednesday evening most weeks at Aldercar Community Language College.

== Transport ==
Langley Mill rail station, one mile (1.6 km) east of Heanor town centre, has services to Nottingham, Sheffield and beyond. Earlier the Midland Railway had a line between Shipley Gate and Butterley that passed through Heanor, but it was closed to passengers in 1926. The Great Northern Railway had a branch line that terminated in a goods yard and small station in Heanor. This was closed in 1928, though temporarily reopened in 1939.

Bus routes link Heanor with Nottingham, Derby, Mansfield and other towns and cities in the area. The main operator is Trent Barton with one route run by Notts + Derby. Yourbus formerly ran services.

The nearest international airport is East Midlands Airport (18 miles, 29 km).

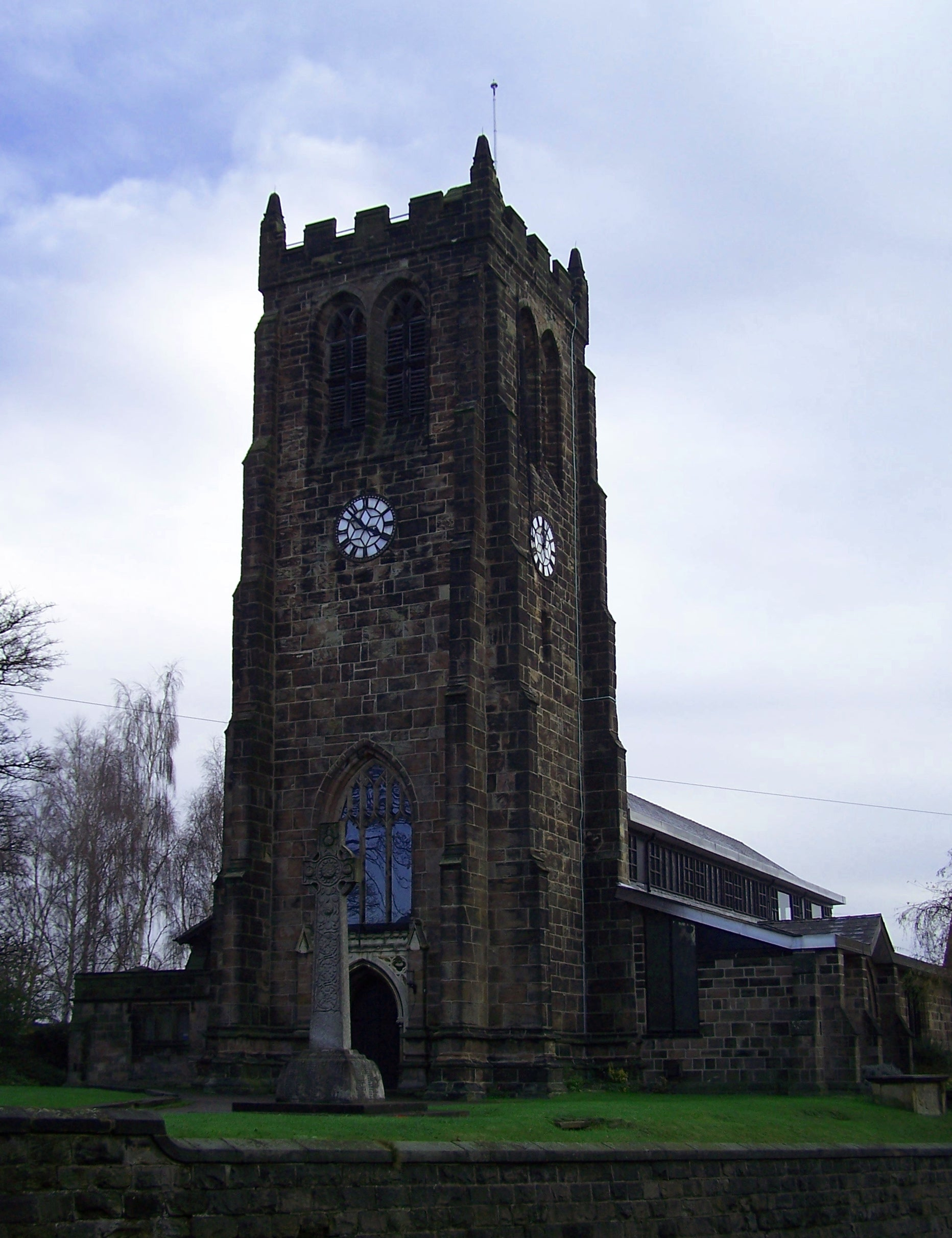
St Lawrence's Church

== Notable buildings ==
There are ten structures in Heanor and Loscoe civil parish listed by Historic England as of particular architectural or historical interest: two in Loscoe and eight in Heanor. The Church of St Lawrence in Heanor is listed as Grade II*. The other nine, which include Heanor Town Hall, are listed as Grade II. St Lawrence's has 15th-century origins, but was altered in 1866–1868 and about 1980.

== Media ==
Local news and television programmes are provided by BBC East Midlands and ITV Central. Television signals are received from the Waltham TV transmitter.

Local radio stations are BBC Radio Derby, Smooth East Midlands, Capital Midlands, Hits Radio East Midlands, Greatest Hits Radio Midlands and Amber Sound FM, a community based radio station.

The district newspaper was the Ripley and Heanor News, it appeared on Thursdays but was amalgamated into the Derbyshire Times in 2021.

== Heanorites ==
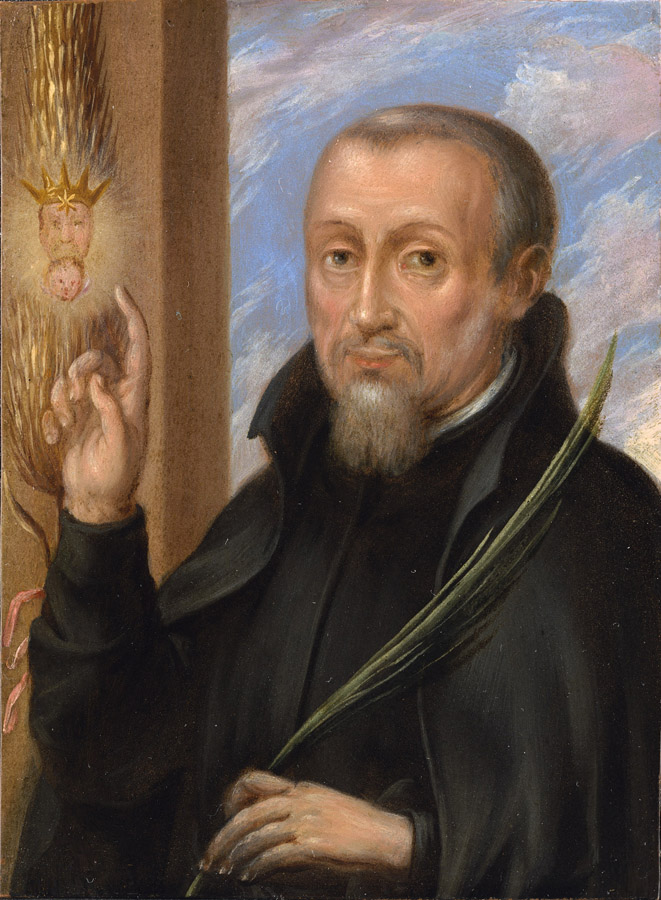
Portrait of Henry Garnett, 17th C.

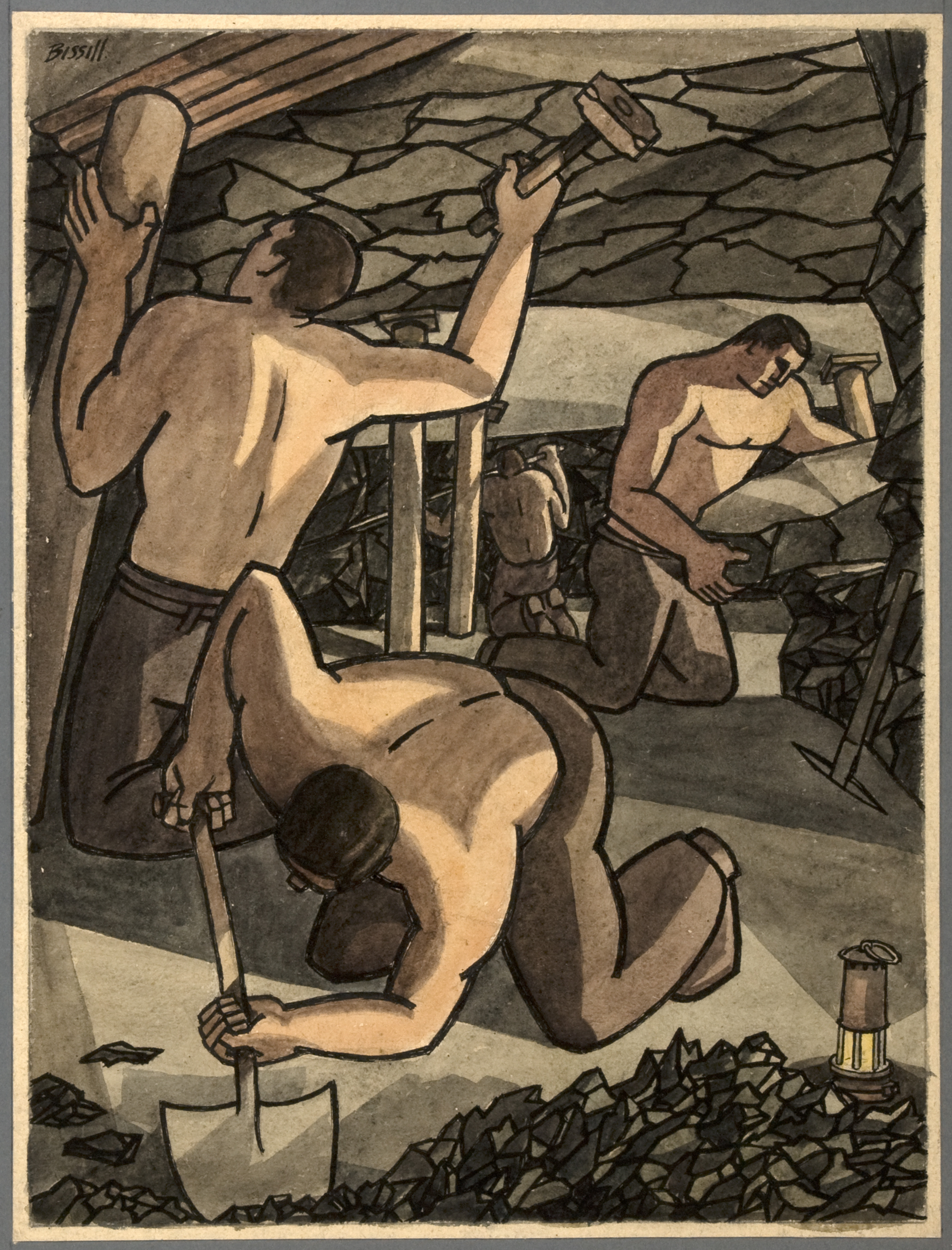
Coal miners at work by George Bissill

- Henry Garnet (1555–1606), Jesuit, born in Heanor, executed for involvement in the Gunpowder Plot.
- Sir Thomas Bloodworth (1620–1682), merchant and politician, Lord Mayor of London during Great Fire of London, was born at Heanor.
- Samuel Roper (died 1658), antiquary, was born in Heanor.
- Samuel Watson (c. 1662–1715), sculptor in wood and stone, was born in Heanor.
- John Varley (1740–1809), canal engineer, supervised construction of the Chesterfield Canal, born in Heanor.
- The Howitt brothers: William Howitt (1792–1879), author, Richard, (1799–1869) poet and Godfrey (1800–1873), entomologist, were born in Heanor.
- Mary Howitt (1799–1888), author, lived in Heanor.
- Edward Smith (1819–1874), physician, medical writer and dietician, was born in Heanor.
- William Gregg (1890–1969), Company Sergeant-Major in The Sherwood Foresters, born and died in Heanor, awarded the Victoria Cross for bravery in 1918.
- Sir Conrad Corfield (1893–1980), civil servant and the private secretary to several viceroys of India, including Lord Mountbatten
- George Bissill (1896–1973), painter, grew up in Langley Mill and attended school in Heanor.
- Sir Richard W. B. Clarke (1910–1975), journalist and civil servant, was born in Heanor.
- Douglas Keen (1913–2008), designer of Ladybird Books, lived in Heanor and created the first title in the kitchen of his house there.

=== Sport ===
- Billy Bestwick (1875–1938), cricketer who played 323 First-class cricket matches was born in Heanor.
- George Robinson (1908–1963), footballer who played 269 games including 198 for Charlton Athletic
- Eddie Barks (1921–1989), footballer who played 279 games including 213 for Mansfield Town
- Helen Fletcher (1931–2022), a British tennis player and a Wimbledon doubles semi-finalist
- Peter Hill (1931–2015), footballer who played 285 games for Coventry City

== Notes and references ==
Notes
