= Loscoe =

Former mining village in Derbyshire, England

Coordinates: 53.0258°N 1.3716°W

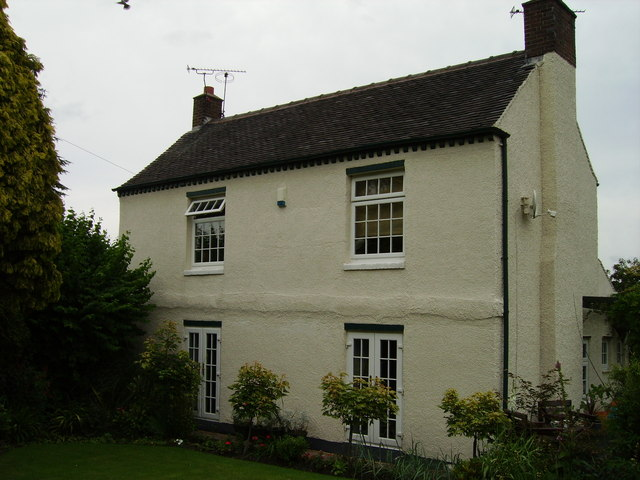
- Highfield House

- Location within Derbyshire
- Population: 5,335 (electoral ward, 2011 census)
- OS grid reference: SK4224547796
- Civil parish: Heanor and Loscoe
- District: Amber Valley
- Shire county: Derbyshire
- Region: East Midlands
- Country: England
- Sovereign state: United Kingdom
- Post town: HEANOR
- Postcode district: DE75
- Dialling code: 01773
- Police: Derbyshire
- Fire: Derbyshire
- Ambulance: East Midlands
- UK Parliament: Amber Valley

Loscoe is a village near Heanor in Derbyshire, England, lying within the civil parish of Heanor and Loscoe. It had prominent coalmines in the 19th and 20th centuries. Denby Common and Codnor Breach are hamlets on the western edge of the village.

== History ==
The name Loscoe derives from Old Norse words lopt and skógr, as in lopt í skógi, meaning "loft in a wood" or "wood with a loft house". It was recorded as Loscowe in 1277.

Loscoe Manor formed part of the wider Draycott Estate; Richard and William de Draycott were recorded at Loscoe (or Loschowe) in 1401. The manor house was demolished in 1704.

Loscoe's economy in the 19th and 20th centuries was dominated by coal mining: pit chimneys and slag heaps were prominent. Three mines operated: Old Loscoe (early 1830s – 1933), Bailey Brook (1847–1938) and Ormonde (1908–1970).

Loscoe was in the ecclesiastical parish of Heanor until 1844, when a church was built between Loscoe and neighbouring Codnor to the north, and a joint parish created for them. Loscoe became a separate parish in 1927. Services were held in the mission church until a new parish church, dedicated to St Luke, was completed in 1938.

== Explosion ==
Loscoe was the site of a landfill gas migration explosion on 24 March 1986. Although there were no fatalities, one house was destroyed by the blast and its three occupants injured.

The atmospheric pressure on the night of the explosion fell 29 hPa (29 mbar) over a seven-hour period, causing the gas to be released from the ground in much greater quantities than usual. In the four hours before the explosion at approximately 6.30 am, the local meteorological office had recorded average falls of 4 hPa (4 mbar) per hour. Several cubic metres of landfill gas (consisting of a 3:2 mixture of methane and carbon dioxide) collected underground near the house at 51 Clarke Avenue, and as the gas expanded it flowed into the space beneath the floor, from where it was drawn by convection to the gas central-heating boiler and ignited.

The incident led to the introduction of key British legislation and government guidance, with research into landfill behaviour and revised best practice at landfill sites. These moves were designed to vent gas into the atmosphere over time, then to burn off methane, and eventually in the most productive sites, to use gas turbines to turn the gas into electric power for the national grid.

== Demography ==
In the 2011 census the electoral ward of Heanor and Loscoe (covering Loscoe and north-western parts of Heanor) had 2,285 dwellings, 2,216 households and a population of 5,335. The average age of residents was 40.5 (39.3 for England as a whole) and 17.9 per cent were aged 65 or over (16.4 per cent for England as a whole).

== Governance ==
For representation within Heanor and Loscoe Town Council and Amber Valley Borough Council, Heanor and Loscoe civil parish is divided into three electoral wards: Heanor East, Heanor West and Heanor and Loscoe. In the May 2019 Parish Council elections, the Heanor and Loscoe Ward obtained seven seats, made up of four Labour and three Conservative candidates.

== Notable residents ==
- Francis Tantum (1674—1729), clockmaker
- BMX racer Dale Holmes was born here on 6 October 1971.

== See also ==
- Listed buildings in Heanor and Loscoe
