= Ilkeston United F.C. =

Ilkeston United
- Full name: Ilkeston United Football Club
- Nickname(s): the Robins
- Founded: 1894
- Dissolved: 1932
- Ground: Manor Ground
- League: Derbyshire League
- 1931–32 (last full season): 2nd
| Original colours | 1926–32 colours |

Ilkeston United Football Club was an association football club from Ilkeston in Derbyshire.

== History ==
The earliest record of the club is from 1894, when it was an entrant to the Long Eaton Cup Competition, a competition put up by the Long Eaton Rangers for minor clubs. Originally the club played within the Nottinghamshire region, joining the Notts Football Association in April 1894, before moving over to Derbyshire in 1899.

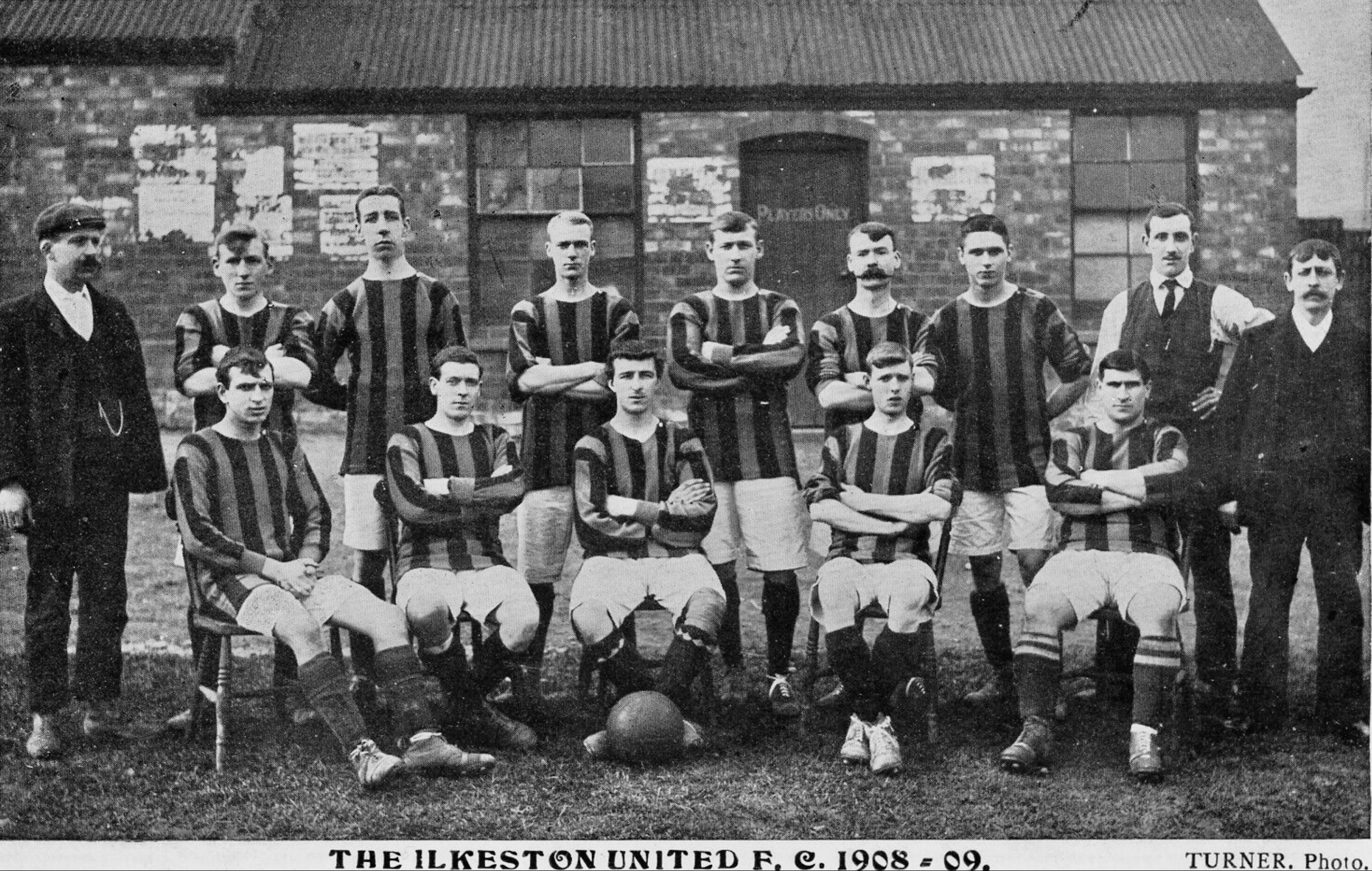
Ilkeston United F.C., 1908–09, taken at the Manor Ground.

United gained prominence after the demise of Ilkeston Town, and from the mid-1900s proved a local force. It reached the fourth qualifying round of the FA Cup in 1905–06, 1907–08, and 1909–10; in the last of those, the club visited Stoke, and held the Potters in a "particularly entertaining" game until the last 15 minutes, when the home side scored twice - goalkeeper Joe Webster "was responsible for the best example of custodianship I have seen for several years". It also won the Erewash section of the Derbyshire Senior Cup from 1903–04 to 1906–07 and the Derbyshire Senior League in 1907–08, ahead of the Derby County reserve side. At the time the club's crowds were regularly reaching 4,000.

The club nearly went out of existence in the late 1920s, and was only kept going by donations from chairman Fred Kenward, a butcher, who also secured the club admission to the Midland League in 1925; the club also reached the fourth qualifying round of the Cup one more time in 1926–27.

However, after the 1927–28 season, following three seasons of struggling, the club failed re-election and dropped back into the Derbyshire Senior League; an immediate consequence was that in the 1928–29 season the club's gate receipts more than halved to just under £500 - only the transfer of George Robinson to Sunderland, which earned the club £100, ensuring a positive balance.

Kenward's death in 1931 robbed the club of its chief benefactor. Despite a successful 1931–32 season, which saw the club finish second in the Derbyshire League, the club went bust in July 1932, with four of the committee members being involved in starting up a short-lived phoenix club called simply Ilkeston.

== Colours ==
The club's original colours were red and green stripes; by 1910 they were red and blue with white knickers. In at least 1913–14 they were white shirts with a red V, but the red and blue returned after the First World War. In 1926 the club bought a new set of plain red shirts thanks to the sale of raffle tickets.

== Ground ==
The club played at the Manor Ground, inherited from the earlier Ilkeston club.
