= Heanor Gate Science College =

Heanor Gate Spencer Academy
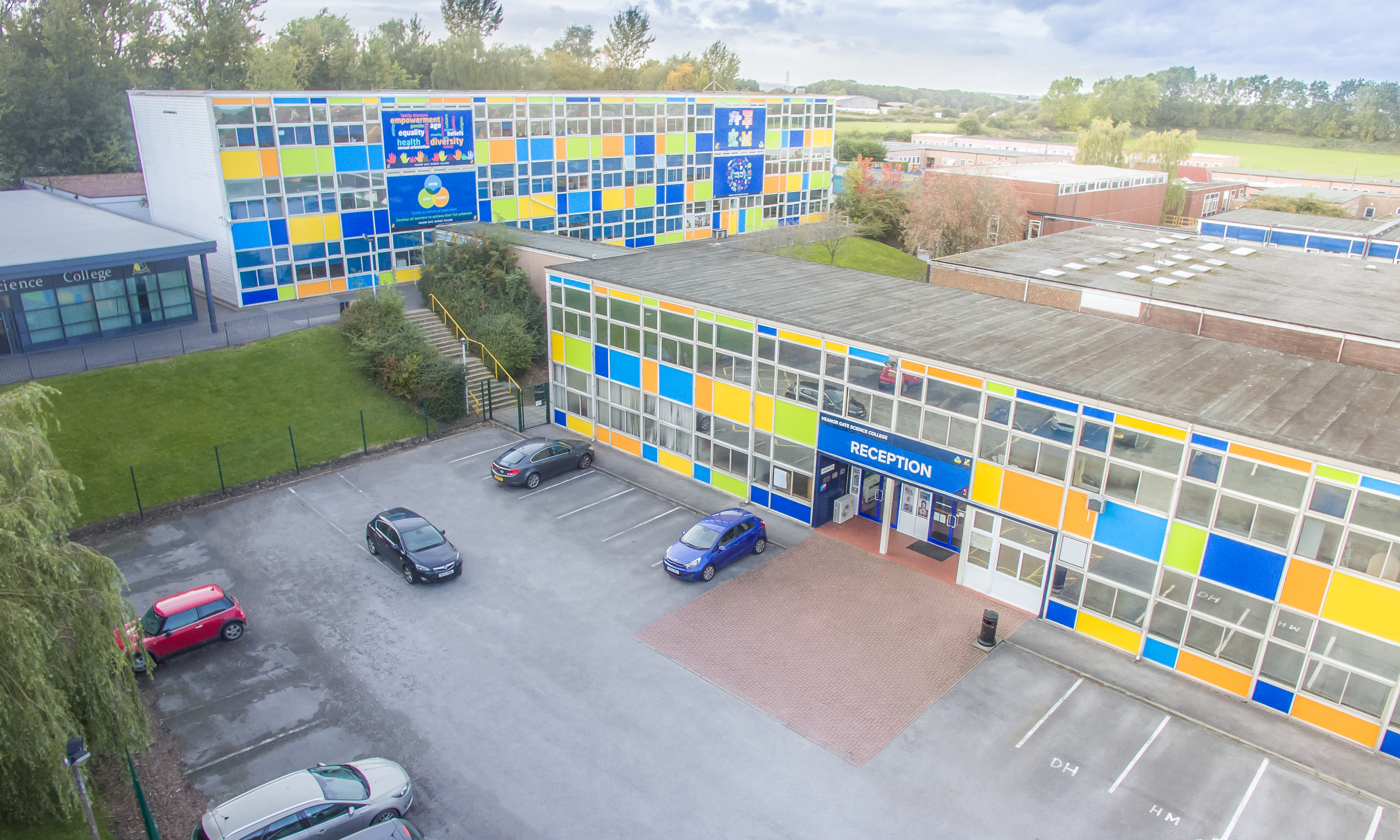

Location
- Kirkley Drive; Heanor, Derbyshire, DE75 7RA; England; 53.01106°N 1.37081°W

Information
- Type: Academy
- Motto: Aspire Learn Achieve
- Established: 1964
- Specialist: Science College
- Department for Education URN: 137606 Tables
- Ofsted: Reports
- Principal: Matt Jones
- Gender: Mixed
- Age: 11 to 18
- Enrolment: 1357
- Former names: Heanor Gate Comprehensive School; Heanor Gate School
- Website: www.heanorgate.org.uk

Heanor Gate Spencer Academy is a medium-sized secondary academy school and specialist Science College located in Heanor in the Amber Valley district of Derbyshire, England. Although in 2012 the school achieved an "outstanding" Ofsted report, in 2013 the school was downgraded to "inadequate", which resulted in the school being placed in special measures.

== History ==
It opened in September 1964 as Heanor Gate County Secondary School, a secondary modern school being officially opened on 19 June 1965. In the 1990s, it became a grant maintained school. It became a foundation school, very similar to grant maintained status, and added a sixth form. In 2002, it gained Science College specialist status, the first in Derbyshire. This was incorporated into the school's name from October 2002. The school converted to an Academy in November 2011. The school then became part of the Spencer Academies Trust from September 2014 and was officially renamed from Heanor Gate Science College to Heanor Gate Spencer Academy on 1 September 2021.

=== Former schools ===
Other schools that combined to produce the school include Heanor Grammar School on Mundy Street, the William Howitt Secondary Modern School on Loscoe Road and Loscoe Road Girls Secondary Modern School. The former grammar school became the South East Derbyshire College in 1976.

=== School buildings ===
In February 2010 the Art and Technology block (H block) suffered a devastating fire caused by an electrical fault, which resulted in the Art section of the building being completely destroyed. This section of the block was consequently removed and replaced with a covered work area for the construction students. The Art block was subsequently moved to the newly built N block. This block then received an extension in 2012.

In 2013 the Science block (F block) was completely refurbished to provide new and improved science facilities for the school.

The Sixth Form block (P block) was constructed in 2025 to provide a larger space for the students and some new class rooms.

A new Student Support block (T block) was also constructed in 2014 to provide better facilities for students requiring educational support or help during school life from the school.

== Admissions ==
The school accepts children aged 11–16. The Post 16 Centre (Sixth Form) is for ages 16–18.

== School buildings ==
The school has a total of 15 blocks, some part of the original school, although some are temporary buildings.

- A block- Admin and Reception
- B block- Hall and Gym
- C block- Careers & Support Centre
- D block- Mathematics & English
- E block- English, Business Studies and Computer Studies
- F block- Sciences (Physics, Chemistry, Biology)
- G block- Sciences, including Social Sciences (Psychology & Sociology)
- H block- Design Tech and Catering (part of the original art building was destroyed in the fire)
- J block- Humanities, Achievement Centre
- K block- Modern Foreign Languages
- L block- Hair and Beauty, Beauty Salon
- M block- Music
- N block- Art & Design, Sociology
- P block - Sixth Form Centre
- S block- PEPA (Physical Education, Drama)
- T block- Student and SEN Support

== Academic performance ==
It gets GCSE results at about the average for comprehensive schools in England, but slightly below average for Derbyshire. A-Level results are slightly under the England average.
