= Samuel Roper (antiquary) =

English antiquary

- Born: Heanor, Derbyshire
- Died: 1 September 1658
- Spouse: Elizabeth Gooderell
- Parent: Thomas Roper

Samuel Roper (died 1658) was an English antiquary.

== Life ==
He was the eldest son of Thomas Roper of Heanor, Derbyshire, by his second wife, Anne, daughter and co-heir of Alvered Gresbrooke of Middleton, Warwickshire. Roper claimed ancestry going back before Henry V. In about 1615 Roper made the acquaintance of Sir William Dugdale before he became connected with him by marriage. Roper lived for some time in Monks Kirby in Warwickshire. He assisted Dugdale in his history of the county, making investigations which resulted in the discovery of foundations of old walls and Roman bricks. He died on 1 September 1658.

== Antiquarian ==
Dugdale in his Antiquities of Warwickshire mentions Roper as "a gentleman learned and judicious, and singularly well seen in antiquities." Roper also had chambers in Lincoln's Inn, and there Dugdale first met in 1638 Roger Dodsworth, his future collaborator in the Monasticon Anglicanum. Roper worked out the genealogy of his own family, and his pedigree fills several pages in the Visitation of Derbyshire of 1654. It is illustrated by extracts from deeds, and drawings of seals; but the proofs are usually taken from private muniments, which are seldom corroborated by public records. It satisfied Dugdale, who repeated it in his Visitation of Derbyshire of 1662. In the 'Visitation' of 1654 Roper is called "collonell for the parlament". Other sources record him as Colonel.

== Family ==
Roper married Elizabeth, daughter and co-heir of Sir Henry Goodere of Polesworth, Warwickshire, and had issue two sons and four daughters. The eldest son, Samuel Roper (1633–1678),who inherited his father's antiquarian tastes (cf. Life of Dugdale) was a barrister at Lincoln's Inn. He died unmarried.
