= Heanor Town Hall =

Municipal building in Heanor, Derbyshire, England

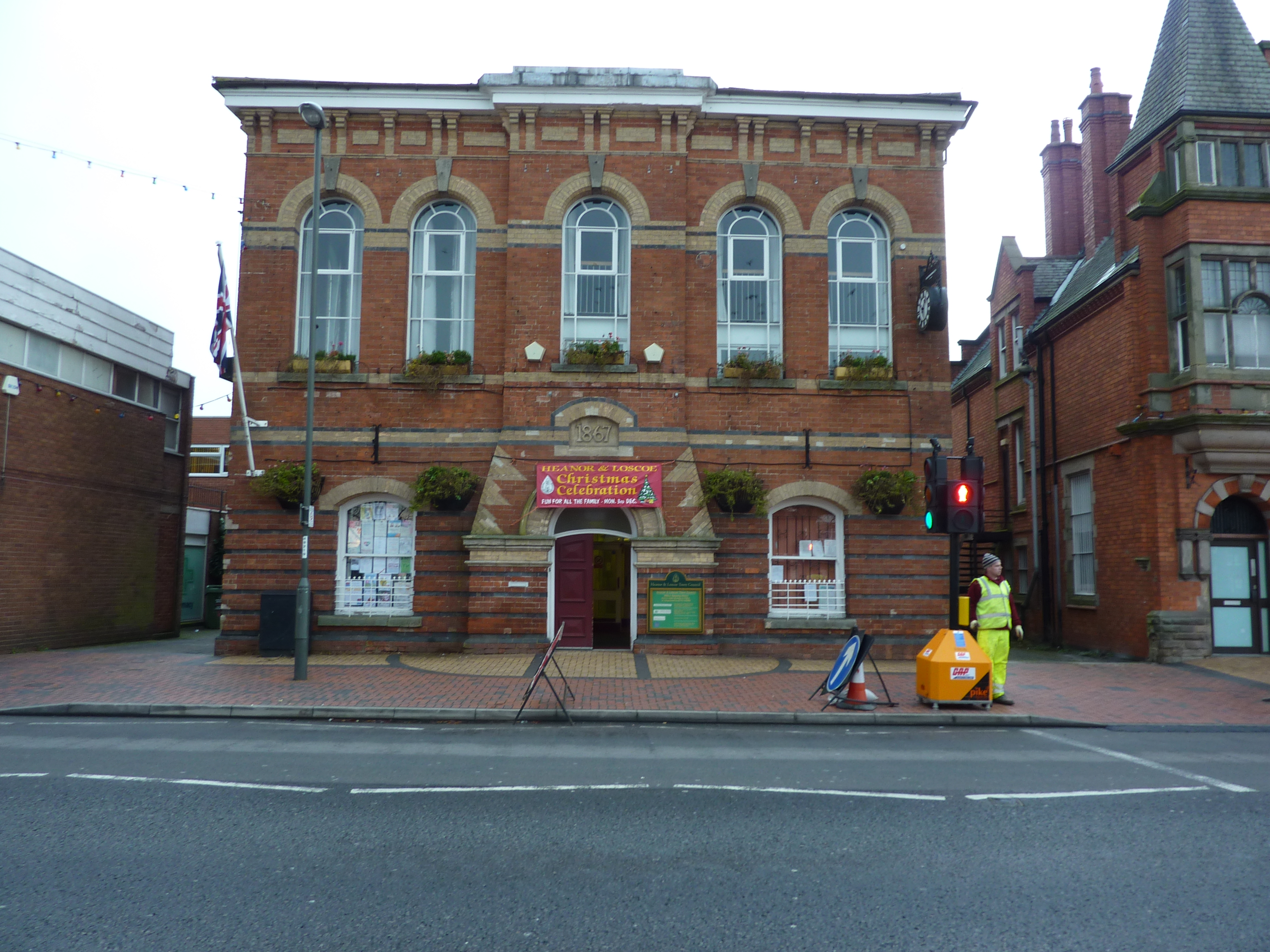
- Heanor Town Hall

- Shown in Derbyshire
- 53.0140°N 1.3537°W
- Location: Market Street, Heanor

History
- Built: 1867

Site notes
- Architectural style: Italianate style

Listed Building – Grade II
- Official name: Registry Office
- Designated: 25 May 1988
- Reference no.: 1158590

Heanor Town Hall is a municipal building in the Market Street, Heanor, Derbyshire, England. The town hall, which is the meeting place of Heanor and Loscoe Town Council, is a grade II listed building.

== History ==
The building was initially commissioned as "public offices" for the local board of health, which had been formed in 1863. It was designed in the Italianate style, was built in red brick with stone dressings and was completed in 1867. The design involved a symmetrical main frontage with five bays facing onto Market Street; the central bay, which projected forward at ground level but with the projection tapering back higher up, featured a round headed doorway with a fanlight and a stone surround on the ground floor; there were five round headed windows with keystones forming an arcade on the first floor and a series of modillions supporting a cornice above. Internally, the principal room was the council chamber. In the 19th century an adjacent building to the north west formed a lock-up and police station. The public offices became the meeting place of Heanor Urban District Council when it was formed in 1894.

In 1908 Fred Buxton of Langley Mill hired the building to show moving pictures and a banner was hoisted outside the building advertising its new role as "Buxton's Picture Palace". Then, on 2 March 1910, during the Ilkeston by-election, the suffragette, Emmeline Pankhurst, booked the building and gave a speech in support of the Liberal Party candidate and future Secretary of State for War, J. E. B. Seely: the meeting was well supported with hundreds of people in attendance.

The building continued to serve as a meeting place for Heanor Urban District Council for much of the 20th century but ceased to be local seat of government when the enlarged Amber Valley Borough Council was formed in 1974. It was subsequently used as a registry office and, after its condition deteriorated, it was saved from demolition in the early 1990s. After an extensive programme of refurbishment works which was completed in June 1995, the building then became the meeting place of Heanor and Loscoe Town Council. A millennium banner depicting the stained glass windows of the parish church, local individuals, the town fair and the market place, was embroidered by members of the local community and presented to the mayor, Harry Soar, on 11 November 1998; it was subsequently placed on display in the council chamber in the building.

== See also ==
- Listed buildings in Heanor and Loscoe
