= South East Derbyshire College =

Defunct further education college

Information
- Type: Further Education College
- Established: 1953
- Closed: 2010
- Former Principals: Linnia Khemdoudi, Mark Flynn, Mick Brown, Brenda Remington, Mike Clegg and Ewart Taylor
- Gender: Mixed
- Age: 16+

South East Derbyshire College (S.E.D.C) was a college located in Ilkeston, Heanor and Morley. It had several campuses, Field Road, Cavendish Road Arts Centre in Ilkeston, Ilkeston Road and Mundy Street in Heanor. It also consisted of several outreach centres including in the towns of Alfreton and Belper.

Due to financial pressures on the college the outreach centres were closed one by one and the Ilkeston Road Campus in Heanor was closed and later destroyed by fire. The Ilkeston Road site in Heanor was sold to David Wilson homes who developed luxury domestic residences there. The sites of Field Road and Cavendish Road were demolished in 2017 for a housing development and Morrisons supermarket.

South East Derbyshire College merged with Derby College in 2010. This was a merger forced by the UK Government, despite Derby College having withdrawn an initial bid to merge with the failing college due to its crippling financial status. The final stages of a merger with The University of Derby were overturned by the newly elected Government, and the two remaining campus in Heanor and Ilkeston became a Derby College campus during the 2010 merge. The former Field Road and Cavendish Road campus were both auctioned off in 2013. The newly built campus opened in January 2014 on the grounds of the Old Magistrates Court in Ilkeston, this would serve Derby College students in January 2014.

== History ==
The college began as the Ilkeston College of Further Education on 14 September 1953, the official opening ceremony took place on 25 June 1954, the college became South East Derbyshire College of Further Education in 1966. When it opened, in 1974, a site in Heanor on the former Heanor Grammar School was an annexe of the main college. Heanor Grammar School closed in 1976, it had around 550 boys and girls. Geoffrey Stone was the headmaster for twenty years and became Principal of the new college.

== Structure ==
The former college is now part of Derby College and provides education and training to young people in Derby and Derbyshire.

== Merge and closure ==
On 15 February 2010 South East Derbyshire College was dissolved and all of its educational facilities, services and staff was transferred to Derby College. David Croll, the (then) Principal and Chief Executive of Derby College, led the newly merged college which will operate under the Derby College banner.

The newly merged college will continue to operate from SEDC's existing sites in Ilkeston and Heanor and from Derby College's other sites located in Derby and Derbyshire. Meanwhile, an estates and learning review is being undertaken to ensure learners benefit from the best facilities for their chosen courses.

Mary Rogers, senior account director-designate for the Skills Funding Agency, commented: “The LSC and its successor bodies will be working with the merged college to ensure that the needs of learners, employers and their communities can be effectively met with the delivery of high quality learning.”

The governing body of South East Derbyshire College proposed to merge with Derby College. This would be achieved by the dissolution of the further education corporation of South East Derbyshire College and the transfer of its property, rights and liabilities to the further education corporation of Derby College. The governing body of Derby College separately proposed to the Secretary of State that the name of the college be changed to Derbyshire College to reflect the changed nature of the college; however, the change of name was scrapped, and the college would continue under the name of Derby College for the foreseeable future.

The principal reason advanced by the governors of the colleges in support of the proposal is to create a cost-effective, high-quality general further education college which builds on the strengths of the two colleges. The merged college will also meet the changing needs of learners and support the developing local infrastructure and the regional economy. The merged college will aim to increase learner participation and success rates within the area – particularly where there is significant under representation amongst identifiable groups of potential learners.

== Alumni ==
=== Heanor Grammar School ===
- Audley Bowdler Williamson, the chemist who invented Swarfega and started his company now called Deb Limited
