= George Bissill =

English painter

- Born: 22 June 1896; Fairford, England
- Died: 14 September 1973 (aged 77)
- Education: Nottingham School of Art

George William Bissill (22 June 1896 – 14 September 1973) was a British miner, painter, and furniture designer. Bissill's paintings are held in a number of important public collections, including the Tate Gallery, National Museum of Northern Ireland and the Manchester Art Gallery. Bissill was known for his landscapes and figurative paintings in oil, watercolour and woodcuts.

== Early life ==
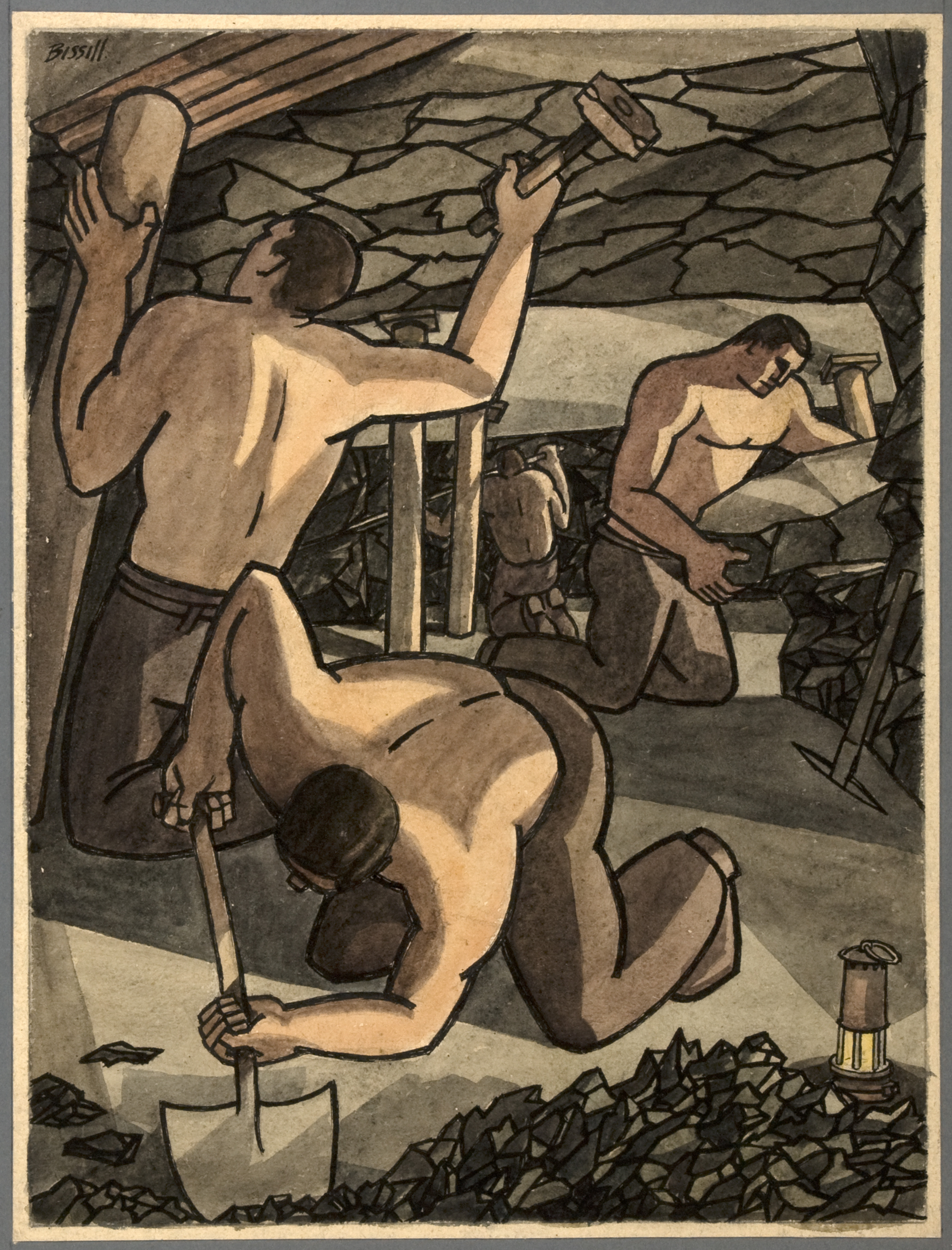
Poster by Bissill commissioned for the Ministry of Information during the Second World War showing coal miners at work.

George Bissill was born in Fairford in Gloucestershire, but the family soon moved to the mining village of Langley Mill in Derbyshire where his father worked as a railway brakesman. At 13 George was sent down the mines, where he worked, initially with pit ponies, then at the coal face, until 1915 when he joined the Kings Royal Rifles (First Battalion) to fight in the First World War. He had hoped to escape the underground life but as an ex-miner he was immediately trained to be a sapper, tunnelling, defusing mines and laying mines under enemy lines. While working near Béthune in France, he suffered a catastrophic tunnel collapse and later in the war he was badly gassed. In 1918 he was invalided out of the army.

With his army pension, he spent a few months at Nottingham School of Art, but he had already developed his own distinctive style and subject matter, saying later that the pit was the only art school he needed.

== London and Paris ==
After a spell working as a village postman, during which he exhibited at the Ilkeston Arts Club annual exhibition in Derbyshire, he decided to try to take his work to London. He arrived in London in 1922 and took a pitch as a pavement artist outside Bush House, which was just being constructed. There he was ‘spotted’ by a member of the Arts League of Service, who in 1924 took a portfolio of his mining drawings around the country for exhibition.

Soon after this the newly established Redfern Gallery in Bond Street offered him an exhibition, which opened to great critical acclaim in April 1925. Bissill immediately became extremely famous, causing a sensation with his pictures of miners toiling underground, a subject matter which was new to the London Art Scene and was ten years before the Pitmen Painters came to fame. The show was reviewed by all the major art critics and newspapers. Other exhibitions at the Redfern Gallery followed and Bissill worked successfully in London for the next 5–6 years.

Soon after the first exhibition opened in 1925 Bissill met the ballet critic, writer and art collector Arnold Haskell, who took him on a visit to Paris. Here Bissill learnt the art of wood engraving, producing some of his finest work, and expanded his subject matter to include ballet dancers, harlequins, set designs and pictures of Paris life. Exhibiting his work at Le Nouvel Essor gallery he was again commercially very successful. On his return to London the Redfern Gallery issued a portfolio of his wood engravings, with an introduction by Arnold Haskell.

== Furniture Design ==
In 1926 Arnold Haskell commissioned Bissill to do the entire interior design scheme for his new Kensington home. Photos show rooms, furnished with Bissill's pieces in the Art Deco style, with many of his art works on the walls. All of this was lost when, in 1941 a bomb fell, completely destroying the house.

== Industrial work ==
Bissill created posters for LNER, the GPO and Shell, for whom he also designed a series of newspaper advertisements. He contributed to the famous “You can be sure of Shell” campaign, with paintings of Wicklow in Ireland and Taynton in Gloucestershire, alongside other artists such as John Piper, Cedric Morris, Edwin Callinan and many others.

== Marriage and move to Hampshire ==
Bissill moved out of London in the early 1930s, craving the countryside and contact with nature. He lived in the small village of Ibthorpe in Hampshire at first and here he married Gladys Swann, whom he had met in London. They moved in 1935 to the nearby village of Ashmansworth and lived there for the rest of their lives. From that time Bissill called himself a 'landscape painter'. But he also undertook picture restoration and became well known as a dealer in the local art salerooms. He spent most of his time painting the local landscape, and his snow scenes became particularly popular. In 1941 he contributed several watercolours to Kenneth Clark's Recording Britain project.

George Bissill died in Ashmansworth in 1973, aged 77. His wife Gladys died in 1983. They had no children.
