= Derby College =

Further education provider in Derby, Derbyshire, England

Location
- Roundhouse Road; Derby, Derbyshire, DE24 8JE; England; 52°54′59″N 1°27′39″W

Information
- Type: FE College
- Established: 2000 (merger)
- Local authority: Derby
- Department for Education URN: 133585 Tables
- Ofsted: Reports
- Principal: Mandie Stravino OBE
- Staff: 1500
- Gender: Coeducational
- Age: 16+
- Website: http://www.derby-college.ac.uk

Derby College is a further education provider with sites located within Derbyshire (Derby and South East Derbyshire – Ilkeston, Morley). It delivers training in workplace locations across England.

Derby College Group is a member of the Collab Group of high-performing further-education institutions.

== History ==
The Derby College of Higher Education split from Derby College of Further Education (FE) during the 1960s. Derby FE was primarily targeted at part-time students from engineering companies such as Rolls-Royce and British Rail. This provision continued through to the 1980s until a major restructuring of industry and the apprenticeship system. The FE colleges then took on different types of students and evolved into new areas.

In 1989 Derbyshire County Council was responsible for education, and formed two tertiary colleges, Wilmorton and Mackworth to serve different parts of the city.

=== Mackworth Campus ===
It was opened on the site of the former Parkfields Cedars Grammar School, which moved there in 1969. It became a comprehensive school, then became Mackworth College in 1989. In 1997 there were plans to merge with the University of Derby, but these stalled in 1998.

The building has a 1969 glass-tile mural by the artist Alan Boyson.

=== Wilmorton Campus ===
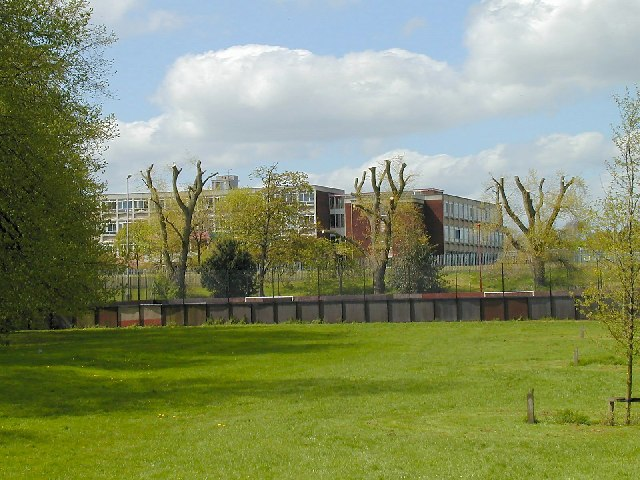
The former Wilmorton College in April 2005

This was situated at the current junction of the Wilmorton Link and London Road on the A6.

=== Broomfield Campus ===
Is situated in the ground of Broomfield Hall. Built in 1873, it was originally the country home of Charles Schwind, and became the Derbyshire Farm Institute. The former students of Broomfield Hall alumni association is called – Broomfield Old Students Association (BOSA).

=== Ilkeston Campus ===
Is situated in Ilkeston in Derbyshire and began as Ilkeston College of Further Education on 14 September 1953. The official opening ceremony took place on 25 June 1954, the college became South East Derbyshire College of Further Education in 1966. When it opened, in 1974, a site in Heanor on the former Heanor Grammar School was an annex of the main college. Heanor Grammar School closed in 1976, it had around 550 boys and girls. Geoffrey Stone was the headmaster for twenty years and became Principal. In 2010 Derby College in Ilkeston was formed between the merges of three campuses of the college that where situated in Ilkeston and Heanor. The former Field Road and Cavendish Road campus were superseded with a modern purpose-built campus was opened in 2014 on the grounds of the Old Magistrates Court in Ilkeston. In 2015 Derby College plans to turn the remaining Heanor campus into a new studio school facility failed to secure enough local interest.

=== Mergers ===
Derby College was established as a single institution in 2002 by merging three further education colleges: Mackworth Tertiary College, Wilmorton Tertiary College and Broomfield Agricultural College. Since then Wilmorton College has been demolished and turned into a housing estate; and Derby College has built two new purpose-built sites; The Joseph Wright Centre (JWC), which specialises in A' levels and in 2010 Derby College reported a 99% success rate for the second year in a row. The Roundhouse redevelopment is the college's flagship site with a focus on vocational qualifications. A merger between South East Derbyshire College and Derby College was approved on 2 February 2010.

== Curriculum ==
The college offers a wide variety of courses at various levels of education. Working with Post 16 curriculum through to university level qualifications BSc / BEng degree, Adult Education and continued professional development (CPD).

== Sites ==
Derby College has a number of campuses across Derbyshire:

=== The Roundhouse (RH) ===
Officially opened in 2010 by the Princess Royal and accompanied by the lord-lieutenant of Derbyshire. The Roundhouse (RH) is dedicated to vocational courses such as Engineering, Construction (gas and plumbing), Civil Engineering, Hair & Beauty, Health and Social Care, Early Years / Child Care, Travel and Tourism, Business and Art & Design.

In 2024, development of the East Midlands Institute of Technology commenced, the new facilities will provide 1100 square metres of spaces for Construction, Engineering, Digital, and Leadership training (Levels 4-6).

As part of the Hair & Beauty faculty, the Roundhouse incorporates the SENSI hairdressing, holistics & beauty salon which are open to the public. The Roundhouse is also the home of the main Derby College Student Union (DCSU) office.

=== The Roundhouse – Johnson Building (JB) ===
The Johnson Building on Locomotive Way, Pride Park, is the transitions centre for Derby College.

In 2024, a new Automotive Engineering Facility was built on the main Roundhouse campus, Stephenson Building.

=== The Roundhouse – Hudson Building (HB) ===
The Hudson (HB) Building on Locomotive Way, Pride Park, is the Construction centre for Derby College, home to Professional Construction, Brick, Bench and Site Joinery, Plastering, Painting and Decorating.

=== Joseph Wright Centre (JWC) ===
Joseph Wright Centre (JWC) – Located in Derby City Centre. It opened in 2005, and was extended in the next two years. Courses include A' Levels (Choice of 35 including extended project), Music, Media, ICT Level 3, Science and T-levels.

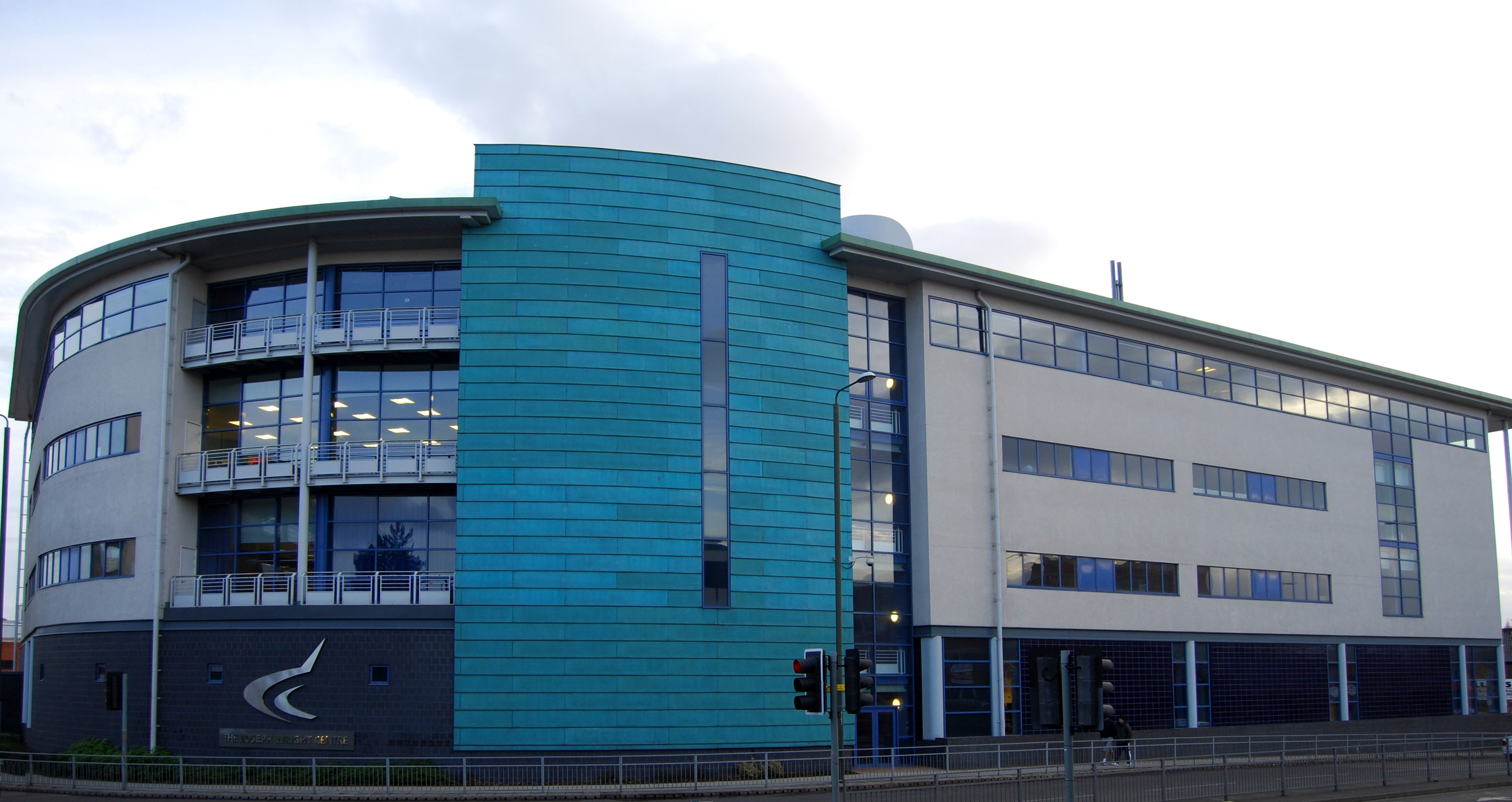
The new Joseph Wright Sixth Form College

=== Broomfield Hall (BH) ===
Broomfield Hall (BH) – Located on the A608 near Morley, Ilkeston, with 450 acres (1.8 km^{2}; 180 ha) of land and was built in 1870. It is the home to Aboriculture, Agriculture, Animal Care, Conservation and Countryside, Equine, Floristry and Flower Arranging, Horticulture, Sport and Public Services courses. The Pathway to Independence programme is based at this site for young people with learning difficulties and disabilities. This used to be an independent agricultural college. It is also technically outside of Derby LEA, in Derbyshire and the Erewash district.

=== The Community College, Ilkeston (ILK / Pimlico) ===
The Ilkeston campus is a purpose-built community campus in the heart of Ilkeston town centre and home to community adult learning.

== St James Centre (SJC) ==
Community learning supporting adult learners within the city.

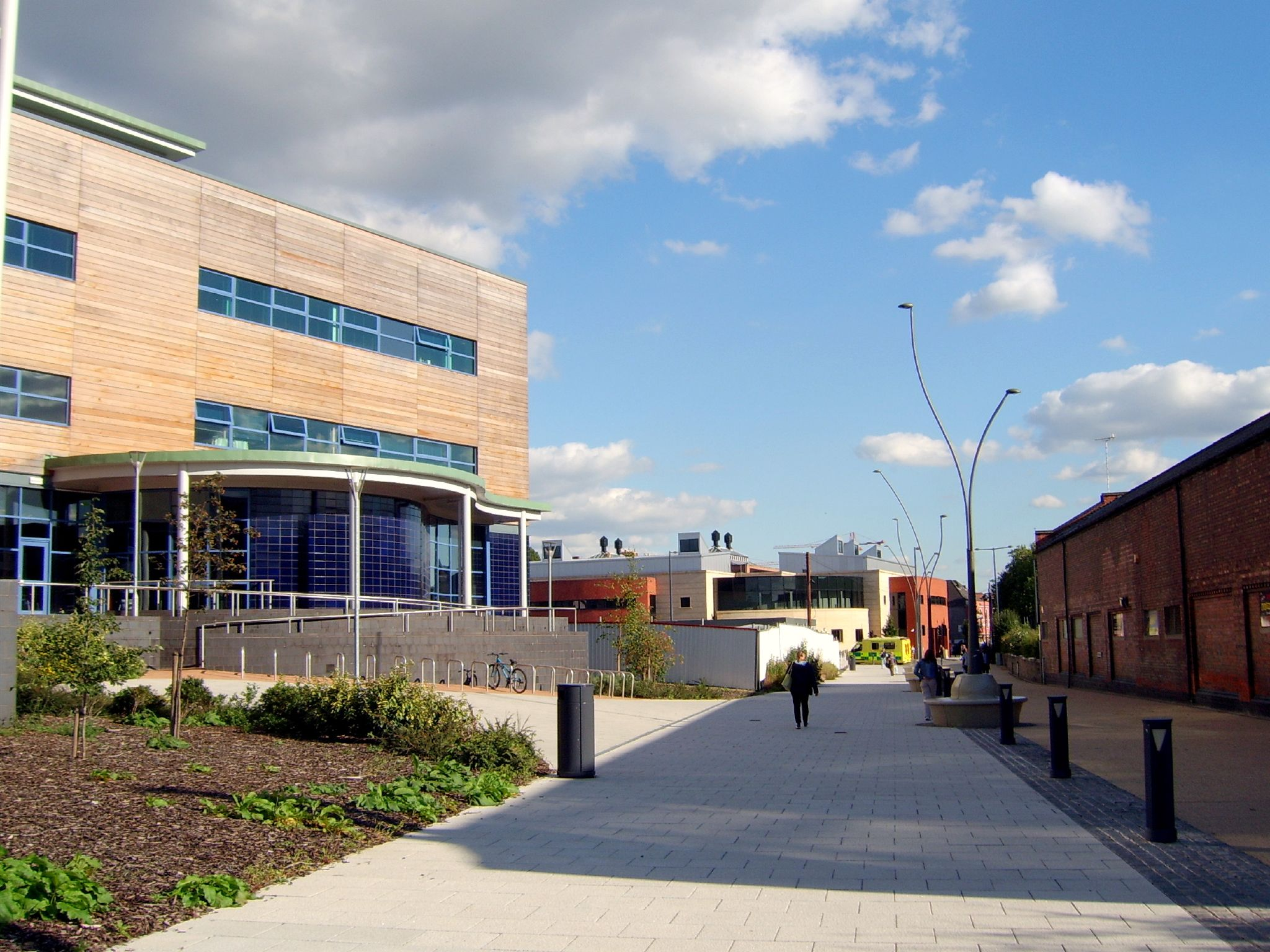
The entrance of the Joseph Wright centre

== The Roundhouse ==
The Roundhouse itself has been recorded by the Guinness World Records as the first roundhouse built in 1839 by the North Midland Railway and is a registered historic site.

The Roundhouse hosted a number of high-profile events and conferences, including International Women's Day celebration and BBC One's Question Time.

== Students' Union ==
The Derby College Students' Union (DCSU) was voted FE Students' Union of the Year 2008.

== Former sites ==
=== Masons Place ===
Masons Place (MP) – Located in Chaddesden. This site delivered Brickwork, Plastering, Carpentry and Joinery, Electrical Installation, Manufacturing, Painting and Decorating, Plumbing & Gas Training, Professional Construction and Road Haulage courses, in addition to some of the Engineering and Rolls-Royce Learning & Career Development courses.

=== Prince Charles Avenue ===
Prince Charles Avenue (PCA) – Was located in the Mackworth Estate, Derby. It was one of the founding sites of Derby College.

=== The Derby Japanese School ===
(ダービー日本人補習校 Dābī Nihonjin Hoshūkō), a Japanese weekend school, held classes in Broomfield Hall.

=== University Technical College ===
In March 2013 the Department for Education announced a successful bid had been approved for a University Technical College Derby College is working with the University of Derby, Rolls-Royce, Toyota, Bombardier and Derby City Council to deliver education and training of young people aged 14 to 19, it will provide normal curriculum studies alongside engineering and technology skills promotion.

=== Employment World @ Derby College (EW) ===
'Employment World @ Derby College' was based in outreach centres across Derby. It works with unemployed people to equip them with the skills required to rejoin the workforce.

Working directly with employers and partners the programmes are available to individuals aged 18+ and are targeted at labour market opportunities. Courses also lead to a full Level 2 or Level 3 Qualification.

=== Derby College IT Learning Centres ===
The Learning Centres offer courses in functional skills such as IT, either for beginners or for those who feel they have advanced computing skills. Closed in 2014.

== Alumni ==
=== Mackworth College ===
- Professor Graham Martin, Professor of Health Organisation and Policy, University of Leicester (1995–97)
- Professor Justin Waring, Professor of Organisational Sociology, University of Nottingham (1994–95)

=== Wilmorton College ===
- Jeremy Groombridge, Director of Transformation and Product Management at Jobcentre Plus since 2006

=== Parkfields Cedars Grammar School ===
- Freda Bedi, born Freda Houlston, who made her life in India where she was a prominent nationalist and later a Tibetan Buddhist nun
- Brigadier Dame Mary Coulshed, Director of the Women's Royal Army Corps (1951–54)
- Patricia Greene, has played Jill Archer in The Archers since 1957
- Judith Hann, Tomorrow's World presenter
- Julia Watson (former head girl), Casualty
