= Derbyshire Times =

British local newspaper

- Type: Weekly newspaper
- Format: Tabloid
- Owner: National World
- Founded: 1854
- Headquarters: Chesterfield
- Circulation: 8,005 (as of 2023)
- Website: derbyshiretimes.co.uk

The Derbyshire Times is a weekly local newspaper published in northern Derbyshire, each edition being on sale from Thursday. Its headquarters are in Chesterfield and much of its coverage centres on the town and the surrounding area. The newspaper also covers parts of the Peak District and Amber Valley areas. The Derbyshire Times is the biggest selling weekly newspaper in the county and in Britain’s top ten for circulation. Published in five editions - Chesterfield/Clay Cross, East, North East, Alfreton area, and Matlock/Peak.

The Derbyshire Times (and Chesterfield Herald) was first published on Saturday, January 7, 1854. Historical copies of the Derbyshire Times and Chesterfield Herald, dating back to 1854, are available to search and view in digitised form at The British Newspaper Archive.

In 1978, the paper's publisher Wilfred Edmunds Ltd became the first English acquisition of Falkirk-based publishers F. Johnston & Co, which later became Johnston Press.

The paper switched from a broadsheet format to tabloid in March 1986 and entered the world of multimedia publishing in 1999 with the launch of its website.

The paper has a staff of 4 reporters and 4 photographers, which is supported by a team of voluntary correspondents. The newspaper contains several supplements focusing on property, motoring, business and entertainment in the area. Once possessing their own printing facility at their Chesterfield premises, the Derbyshire Times has been printed at Johnston Press's Sheffield Web facility in Dinnington in Yorkshire since 2007.

== See also ==
- List of newspapers in the United Kingdom
