= Amber Valley Borough Council elections =

Local government elections in Derbyshire, England

Amber Valley Borough Council elections are held every four years to elect councillors to Amber Valley Borough Council, the local authority for the non-metropolitan district of Amber Valley in Derbyshire, England. Since the last boundary changes in 2023, 42 councillors have been elected to represent 18 wards. Prior to 2023 a third of the council was elected three years out of every four.

== Council election results ==
The party make up of the council after each election is as shown below.

Election	Labour	Conservative	Green Party	Liberal Democrats	Independent	BNP	Total	Notes
1973	33	6	0	3	18	0	60	Inaugural election
1976	18	4	0	14	24	0	60	
1979	18	12	0	7	6	0	43	New Boundaries
1980	24	11	0	4	4	0	43	
1982	22	10	0	7	4	0	43	
1983	23	7	0	8	5	0	43	
1984	21	10	0	8	4	0	43	
1986	23	12	0	5	3	0	43	
1987	19	20	0	3	1	0	43	
1995	37	6	0	0	0	0	43	
1996	37	6	0	0	0	0	43	
1998	37	6	0	0	0	0	43	
1999	32	11	0	0	0	0	43	
2000	12	32	0	0	1	0	45	New Boundaries
2002	19	26	0	0	0	0	45	
2003	25	20	0	0	0	0	45	
2004	24	21	0	0	0	0	45	
2006	18	27	0	0	0	0	45	
2007	17	28	0	0	0	0	45	
2008	14	29	0	0	0	2	45	
2010	14	29	0	0	0	2	45	
2011	15	28	0	0	0	2	45	
2012	21	24	0	0	0	0	45	
2014	23	22	0	0	0	0	45	
2015	21	24	0	0	0	0	45	
2016	22	23	0	0	0	0	45	
2018	20	25	0	0	0	0	45	
2019	25	19	1	0	0	0	45	
2021	16	28	1	0	0	0	45	
2022	11	30	3	0	1	0	45	
2023	26	7	6	1	2	0	42	New Boundaries

== Council elections ==
- 1973 Amber Valley District Council election
- 1976 Amber Valley District Council election
- 1979 Amber Valley District Council election (New ward boundaries)
- 1980 Amber Valley District Council election
- 1982 Amber Valley District Council election
- 1983 Amber Valley District Council election
- 1984 Amber Valley District Council election
- 1986 Amber Valley District Council election (District boundary changes took place but the number of seats remained the same)
- 1987 Amber Valley District Council election
- 1988 Amber Valley District Council election
- 1990 Amber Valley Borough Council election
- 1991 Amber Valley Borough Council election
- 1992 Amber Valley Borough Council election
- 1994 Amber Valley Borough Council election (Borough boundary changes took place but the number of seats remained the same)
- 1995 Amber Valley Borough Council election
- 1996 Amber Valley Borough Council election
- 1998 Amber Valley Borough Council election
- 1999 Amber Valley Borough Council election
- 2000 Amber Valley Borough Council election (New ward boundaries increased the number of seats by two)
- 2002 Amber Valley Borough Council election
- 2003 Amber Valley Borough Council election
- 2004 Amber Valley Borough Council election
- 2006 Amber Valley Borough Council election
- 2007 Amber Valley Borough Council election
- 2008 Amber Valley Borough Council election
- 2010 Amber Valley Borough Council election
- 2011 Amber Valley Borough Council election
- 2012 Amber Valley Borough Council election
- 2014 Amber Valley Borough Council election
- 2015 Amber Valley Borough Council election
- 2016 Amber Valley Borough Council election
- 2018 Amber Valley Borough Council election
- 2019 Amber Valley Borough Council election
- 2021 Amber Valley Borough Council election
- 2022 Amber Valley Borough Council election
- 2023 Amber Valley Borough Council election (New ward boundaries and change to all-out elections)
- 2027 Amber Valley Borough Council election

== Borough result maps ==
2000 results map

2002 results map

2003 results map

2004 results map

2006 results map

2007 results map

2008 results map

2010 results map

2011 results map

2012 results map

2014 results map

2015 results map

2016 results map

2018 results map

2019 results map

2021 results map

2022 results map

2023 results map

== By-election results ==
=== 1994-2000 ===
Riddings by-election, 5 September 1996
Party	Candidate	Votes	%	±%
Conservative		619	48.2	
Labour		545	42.5	
Liberal Democrats		119	9.3	
Majority		74	5.7	
Turnout		1,164	24.0	
Conservative gain from Labour		Swing		

=== 1997-2001 ===
Alfreton West by-election, 26 June 1997
Party	Candidate	Votes	%	±%
Labour		354	76.5	−8.3
Liberal Democrats		109	23.5	+8.3
Majority		245	53.0	
Turnout		463	11.8	
Labour hold		Swing		

Wingfield by-election, 16 July 1998
Party	Candidate	Votes	%	±%
Conservative		372	44.7	+4.2
Labour		259	31.1	−23.1
Independent		165	19.8	+19.8
Liberal Democrats		36	4.3	−2.8
Majority		113	13.6	
Turnout		832	45.0	
Conservative gain from Labour		Swing		

Swanwick by-election, 22 October 1998
Party	Candidate	Votes	%	±%
Conservative		673	68.8	+23.3
Labour		305	31.2	−23.3
Majority		368	37.6	
Turnout		978	22.9	
Conservative gain from Labour		Swing		

=== 2000-2006 ===
Belper Central by-election, 20 June 2002
Party	Candidate	Votes	%	±%
Conservative		618	53.8	−3.9
Labour		531	46.2	+10.2
Majority		87	7.6	
Turnout		1,149	28.0	
Conservative hold		Swing		

Heage and Ambergate by-election, 8 December 2005
Party	Candidate	Votes	%	±%
Conservative		557	52.3	+3.6
Labour		381	35.8	+5.7
Liberal Democrats	Tony Cooper	127	11.9	−9.3
Majority		176	16.5	
Turnout		1,065	24.0	
Conservative hold		Swing		

Heanor & Loscoe by-election, 2 February 2006
Party	Candidate	Votes	%	±%
Labour	Alan Longdon	570	42.0	−11.9
BNP	Paul Snell	411	30.2	+30.2
Conservative	Jean Parry	317	23.3	−22.8
Liberal Democrats	Sally McIntosh	61	4.5	+4.5
Majority		159	11.8	
Turnout		1,359	33.0	
Labour hold		Swing		

=== 2006-2010 ===
Ripley & Marehay by-election, 17 September 2009
Party	Candidate	Votes	%	±%
Labour	Lyndsay D Cox	585	52.4	+23.7
Conservative	Matthew C Joyes	531	47.6	−1.7
Majority		54	4.9	
Turnout		1,116	24.1	
Labour hold		Swing	12.6%	

=== 2010-2014 ===
Codnor & Waingroves by-election, 1 August 2013
Party	Candidate	Votes	%	±%
Labour	Isobel Harry	557	52.3	−5.8
UKIP	Garry Smith	250	23.5	+9.6
Conservative	Ron Ashton	219	20.6	−3.3
Liberal Democrats	Keith Falconbridge	39	3.7	+3.7
Majority		307	28.8	
Turnout			26.8	
Labour hold		Swing		

Heanor East by-election, 30 January 2014
Party	Candidate	Votes	%	±%
Labour	Sheila Oaks	548	58.4	+8.4
Conservative	Steven Grainger	350	37.3	+11.0
Liberal Democrats	Kate Smith	41	4.4	−0.2
Majority		198	21.1	
Turnout			18.6	
Labour hold		Swing		

Heanor West by-election, 13 March 2014
Party	Candidate	Votes	%	±%
Labour	Celia Cox	595	52.9	−3.3
UKIP	Philip Rose	259	23.0	+23.0
Conservative	Mark Burrell	229	20.4	−5.2
Liberal Democrats	Kate Smith	41	3.6	+3.6
Majority		336	29.9	
Turnout			23.3	
Labour hold		Swing		

=== 2018-2023 ===
Wingfield by-election, 15 December 2022
Party	Candidate	Votes	%	±%
Conservative	Dawn Harper	242	54.9	−13.9
Liberal Democrats	Kate Smith	114	25.9	+21.4
Labour	Dean Watson	53	12.0	−7.2
Green	Sally Lowick	32	7.3	−0.2
Majority		128	29.0	
Turnout		441	22.9	
Conservative hold		Swing		

=== 2023-2027 ===
Crich & South Wingfield by-election, 2 May 2024
Party	Candidate	Votes	%	±%
Conservative	Tony Harper	617	35.9	−2.4
Liberal Democrats	Marcus Johnson	434	25.2	−12.1
Labour	Amy Trewick	428	24.9	+11.0
Green	Fiona Horton	240	14.0	+1.1
Majority		183	10.7	
Turnout		1719	41.1	
Conservative hold		Swing		

Ironville and Riddings by-election, 1 May 2025
Party	Candidate	Votes	%	±%
Independent	Philip Rose	463	31.0	New
Conservative	Sarah Jane Tucker	442	29.6	−0.4
Labour	James Earl Whitmore	340	22.8	−20.7
Green	Dave Hatchett	147	9.9	+1.6
Liberal Democrats	Paul Slater	100	6.7	+3.3
Majority		21	1.4	
Turnout		1492	33.6%	
Independent gain from Labour		Swing		

Kilburn, Denby, Holbrook and Horsley by-election, 1 May 2025
Party	Candidate	Votes	%	±%
Conservative	Matt Murray	854	32.1	−2.0
Green	Nicola Perry	676	25.4	+13.3
Labour	John Cowings	585	22.0	−15.1
Independent	Alex Stevenson	375	14.1	New
Liberal Democrats	Sarah Denise Gent	169	6.4	+0.3
Majority		178	6.7	
Turnout		2659	39.9	
Conservative gain from Labour		Swing		

Somercotes by-election 5 June 2025
Party	Candidate	Votes	%	±%
Reform	James Kerry	396	45.3	+36.7
Labour	Sian Harper	346	39.6	−21.3
Conservative	Jake Gilbert	53	6.1	−13.2
Liberal Democrats	Paul Slater	48	5.5	−0.6
Green	Russ Hubber	20	2.2	−2.9
Independent	Alex Stevenson	11	1.3	New
Majority		50	5.7	
Turnout		874	19.4	
Reform gain from Labour		Swing		

Codnor, Langley Mill & Aldercar by-election, 20 January 2026
Party	Candidate	Votes	%	±%
Reform	Dave Chambers	595	45.6	+24.1
Labour	Mark Howard	249	19.1	−20.8
Advance UK	Alex Stevenson	161	12.3	new
Conservative	Jake Gilbert	130	10.0	−15.3
Green	Bess Saunders	77	5.9	−5.5
Derbyshire Community Party	Rob Marshall	50	3.8	new
Liberal Democrats	Gemma Davey	42	3.2	new
Majority				
Turnout		1,304	18.33	
Reform gain from Labour		Swing		

Kilburn, Denby, Holbrook & Horsley by-election, 8 October 2026
Party	Candidate	Votes	%	±%
Green	Bess Saunders	674	29.5	+4.1
Reform	Juliette Stevens	617	27.0	New
Conservative	Paul Moss	386	16.9	−15.2
Labour	Andrew Bayton	364	15.9	−6.1
Restore	Edward Oakenfull	246	10.8	New
Majority		57	2.5	
Turnout			34.3	
Green gain from Conservative		Swing		
