= 2021 Amber Valley Borough Council election =

2021 UK local government election

2021 Amber Valley Borough Council Election
← 2019	6 May 2021	2022 →

16 of 45 seats for Amber Valley Borough Council 23 seats needed for a majority
	First party	Second party	Third party
Party	Conservative	Labour	Green
Last election	19	25	1
Seats won	13	3	0
Seats after	28	16	1
Seat change	▲9	▼9	Steady
Popular vote	14,684	9,728	2,077
Percentage	53.6%	35.5%	7.6%
- Results of the 2021 Amber Valley Borough Council election by ward

The 2021 elections to Amber Valley Borough Council were held on Wednesday 5th May 2021, 16 seats in the council were up for election. The Conservative Party retook control of the council from The Labour Party after losing control in 2019. These seats were due to have been contested in 2020, but the elections were delayed by a year due to the COVID-19 pandemic along with other elections.

== Results summary ==
2021 Amber Valley Borough Council election
Party	This election			Full council			This election		
Party	Seats	Net	Seats %	Other	Total	Total %	Votes	Votes %	+/−
Conservative	13	▲9	81.3	15	28	62.2	14,684	53.6	+18.7
Labour	3	▼9	18.8	13	16	35.6	9,728	35.5	-5.1
Green	0	Steady	0.0	1	1	2.2	2,077	7.6	+3.0
Liberal Democrats	0	Steady	0.0	0	0	0.0	901	3.3	+0.8
National Front	0	Steady	0.0	0	0	0.0	18	0.1	±0.0

== Council composition ==
Following the last election in 2019, the composition of the council was:

↓
25	19	1
Labour	Conservative	Grn

After the election, the composition of the council was:

↓
28	16	1
Conservative	Labour	Grn

Grn - Green

== Ward results ==
Incumbent councillors are denoted by an asterisk (*)

=== Alfreton ===
Alfreton
Party	Candidate	Votes	%	±%
Conservative	Christian Dale	912	47.4	+27.9
Labour	Marlene Bennett*	805	41.9	−11.3
Green	Leo Francis Swarvett	121	6.3	+3.4
Liberal Democrats	Paul Robin Gibbons	85	4.4	−0.5
Majority		107	5.5	
Turnout		1,923	29	+3.0
Conservative gain from Labour		Swing		

=== Belper Central ===
Belper Central
Party	Candidate	Votes	%	±%
Conservative	John Nelson	870	42.6	+8.2
Labour	Maurice Richard Neville*	807	39.6	−2.1
Green	Steve Kennedy	284	13.9	+5.6
Liberal Democrats	Paul Clarence Beardmore	80	3.9	
Majority		63	3.0	
Turnout		2,041	46	+5.0
Conservative gain from Labour		Swing		

=== Belper North ===
Belper North
Party	Candidate	Votes	%	±%
Labour	Ben Rupert Edward Bellamy*	914	46.8	+9.0
Conservative	Mark Edward Robertson	741	38.0	+5.1
Green	James Major John Brooks	237	12.1	−5.4
Liberal Democrats	Richard Alan Salmon	61	3.1	+1.1
Majority		173	8.8	+3.9
Turnout		1,953	50	+1.0
Labour hold		Swing		

=== Codnor and Waingroves ===
Codnor and Waingroves
Party	Candidate	Votes	%	±%
Conservative	Lorna Dorothy Tassi	697	49.5	+23.9
Labour	Chris Emmas-Williams*	628	44.6	−8.8
Green	Jackie Blackett	58	4.1	+1.3
Liberal Democrats	Jeremy Quentin Miles	26	1.8	+0.2
Majority		69	4.9	
Turnout		1,409	35	
Conservative gain from Labour		Swing		

=== Heage and Ambergate ===
Heage and Ambergate
Party	Candidate	Votes	%	±%
Conservative	Tony Harper	927	51.6	+4.9
Labour	Colin Bailey	651	36.2	+0.1
Green	David Martin Hatchett	183	10.2	+5.9
Liberal Democrats	Jan Thompson	35	2.0	−0.2
Majority		276	15.4	+4.8
Turnout		1,796	45	+3.0
Conservative hold		Swing		

=== Heanor and Loscoe ===
Heanor and Loscoe
Party	Candidate	Votes	%	±%
Conservative	Dale Christopher Wright	848	63.4	+37.5
Labour	Kieran James Denbygh Hill*	361	27.0	−13.1
Green	Hilary Ann Fender	77	5.7	+2.6
Liberal Democrats	Steve Radford	52	3.9	+1.2
Majority		487	36.4	
Turnout		1,338	33	
Conservative gain from Labour		Swing		

=== Heanor East ===
Heanor East
Party	Candidate	Votes	%	±%
Conservative	Mark Anthony Burrell	958	63.4	+33.1
Labour	Janet Irene Ward	409	27.1	−11.1
Green	Cathie Hallsworth	107	7.1	+3.6
Liberal Democrats	Jerry Marler	37	2.4	−0.6
Majority		549	36.3	
Turnout		1,511	33	
Conservative gain from Labour		Swing		

=== Heanor West ===
Heanor West
Party	Candidate	Votes	%	±%
Conservative	Jackie Stones	849	53.9	+25.5
Labour	Celia Mary Cox	565	35.9	−6.3
Green	Tina Pritchard	100	6.3	+3.6
Liberal Democrats	Barbara Woodcock Radford	61	3.9	+0.9
Majority		284	18.0	
Turnout		1,575	32	
Conservative gain from Labour		Swing		

=== Ironville and Riddings ===
Ironville and Riddings
Party	Candidate	Votes	%	±%
Conservative	Jack Watson Brown*	938	56.6	+15.9
Labour	Paul Christopher Wardle	594	35.8	−4.0
Green	Rachael Mary Hatchett	84	5.1	+2.7
Liberal Democrats	Kate Mary Kift	41	2.5	+0.6
Majority		344	20.8	+19.9
Turnout		1,657	35	
Conservative hold		Swing		

=== Kilburn, Denby and Holbrook ===
Kilburn, Denby and Holbrook
Party	Candidate	Votes	%	±%
Conservative	Paul Alexander Hillier	1,468	56.8	+9.3
Labour	Keith Lisle Venables	713	27.6	−2.6
Green	Matt McGuinness	265	10.2	+5.7
Liberal Democrats	Chris Gent	140	5.4	+1.5
Majority		755	29.2	+11.9
Turnout		2,586	41	+2.0
Conservative hold		Swing		

=== Langley Mill and Aldercar ===
Langley Mill and Aldercar
Party	Candidate	Votes	%	±%
Conservative	Sam Goodrum	763	63.3	+30.8
Labour	Steven Bower	358	29.7	−13.8
Green	Julie Christine Wozniczka	51	4.2	+2.9
National Front	Timothy Knowles	18	1.5	+0.2
Liberal Democrats	Joanna Karpasea	15	1.3	0.0
Majority		405	33.6	
Turnout		1,205	28	
Conservative gain from Labour		Swing		

=== Ripley ===
Ripley
Party	Candidate	Votes	%	±%
Conservative	Matt Murray	1,472	58.2	+19.2
Labour	Tony Holmes*	863	34.1	−6.0
Green	Jamie Alexander Walls	125	5.0	+2.5
Liberal Democrats	Richard William Smeeton	68	2.7	+0.7
Majority		609	24.1	
Turnout		2,528	35	+3.0
Conservative gain from Labour		Swing		

=== Ripley and Marehay ===
Ripley and Marehay
Party	Candidate	Votes	%	±%
Conservative	Trevor Spencer	900	56.5	+19.9
Labour	Mick Wilson*	568	35.7	−6.2
Green	Michael Peter Bedford	80	5.0	+2.0
Liberal Democrats	Paul Arthur Gillians	45	2.8	+1.2
Majority		332	20.8	
Turnout		1,593	36	+2.0
Conservative gain from Labour		Swing		

=== Shipley Park, Horsley and Horsley Woodhouse ===
Shipley Park, Horsley and Horsley Woodhouse
Party	Candidate	Votes	%	±%
Conservative	Alexander George Stevenson*	1,409	67.3	+15.7
Labour	Amina Sabeah Deen Burslem	392	18.7	−3.4
Green	Lian Pizzey	220	10.5	+6.8
Liberal Democrats	Adrian James Miller	72	3.5	+0.4
Majority		1,017	48.6	+19.1
Turnout		2,093	41	
Conservative hold		Swing		

=== Somercotes ===
Somercotes (2 seats)
Party	Candidate	Votes	%	±%
Labour	John McCabe	590	47.4	
Labour	Katie Louise Simpson	510	41.0	
Conservative	Paul Price	492	39.5	
Conservative	Philip Sanders Rose	440	35.3	
Green	Steve Elliott	85	6.8	
Liberal Democrats	Paul Slater	54	4.3	
Liberal Democrats	Kate Smith	29	2.3	
Turnout			27	
Labour hold		Swing		
Labour hold		Swing		

Only one seat was due to be up for election during this cycle, but a second seat (due up in 2022) was contested due to the death of the sitting councillor
