= 2016 Amber Valley Borough Council election =

2016 UK local government election

2016 Amber Valley Borough Council Election
← 2015	5 May 2016	2018 →

15 of 45 seats for Amber Valley Borough Council 23 seats needed for a majority
	First party	Second party
Party	Conservative	Labour
Last election	24	22
Seats won	4	11
Seats after	23	22
Seat change	▼1	▲1
Popular vote	8,418	9,800
Percentage	34.9%	40.6%
- Map of the results of the 2016 Amber Valley Borough council election. Labour in red and Conservatives in blue. Blank wards were not contested in 2016.

Elections to Amber Valley Borough Council in Derbyshire, England took place on Thursday 5 May 2016. One third of the council seats were up for election and after the election the Conservative Party continued to hold overall control of the council.

After the election, the composition of the council was:

- Conservative 23
- Labour 22

== Election result ==
Amber Valley election result 2016
Party	Seats	Gains	Losses	Net gain/loss	Seats %	Votes %	Votes	+/−
Labour	11	2	1	+1	73.3	40.6	9,800	
Conservative	4	1	2	-1	27.7	34.9	8,418	
UKIP	0	0	0	0	0.0	16.8	4,047	
Green	0	0	0	0	0.0	4.6	1,101	
Liberal Democrats	0	0	0	0	0.0	2.5	592	
Independent	0	0	0	0	0.0	0.5	131	
National Front	0	0	0	0	0.0	0.1	29	

== Ward results ==
Percentage change in party votes are from the last time the ward was contested. This is either 2014 or 2015.

Alfreton
Party	Candidate	Votes	%	±%
Labour	Marlene Bennett	981	53.2	+7.6
Conservative	Kat Moss	360	19.5	−8.1
UKIP	Pete Twiname	342	18.6	−1.6
Liberal Democrats	Henry Foulds	91	4.9	+1.5
Green	Leo Swarvett	53	2.9	−0.3
Rejected ballots		15		
Majority		621	33.7	
Turnout		1842		
Labour hold		Swing		

Belper Central
Party	Candidate	Votes	%	±%
Labour	Maurice Neville	761	41.7	+10.4
Conservative	John Nelson	627	34.4	−8.4
Green	Dave Wells	151	8.3	−4.6
UKIP	John Young	149	8.2	−4.8
Independent	Dave Fisher	131	7.2	+7.2
Rejected ballots		4		
Majority		134	7.3	
Turnout		1823		
Labour gain from Conservative		Swing		

Belper North
Party	Candidate	Votes	%	±%
Labour	Ben Bellamy	662	37.8	+12.7
Conservative	Alan Cox	576	32.9	−9.1
Green	Sue MacFarlane	307	17.5	−0.1
UKIP	Dennis Smith	160	9.1	−6.2
Liberal Democrats	Richard Salmon	35	2.0	+2.0
Rejected ballots		11		
Majority		86	4.9	
Turnout		1751		
Labour gain from Conservative		Swing		

Codnor and Waingroves
Party	Candidate	Votes	%	±%
Labour	Christopher Emmas-Williams	702	53.4	+11.5
Conservative	Linda Edwards-Milsom	337	25.6	+0.8
UKIP	Gaz Smith	212	16.1	−12.1
Green	Jackie Blackett	37	2.8	+2.8
Liberal Democrats	Fay Whitehead	21	1.6	−0.7
Rejected ballots		5		
Majority		365	27.8	
Turnout		1314		
Labour hold		Swing		

Heage and Ambergate
Party	Candidate	Votes	%	±%
Conservative	Angela Ward	749	46.7	+4.5
Labour	Paul Lobley	579	36.1	+1.4
UKIP	Ian Gillatt	168	10.5	−4.2
Green	William MacFarlane	69	4.3	−1.1
Liberal Democrats	Audrey Wootton	36	2.2	−0.8
Rejected ballots		3		
Majority		170	10.6	
Turnout		1604		
Conservative hold		Swing		

Heanor and Loscoe
Party	Candidate	Votes	%	±%
Labour	Kieran Hill	541	40.1	−0.1
UKIP	Geoffrey Aldwinckle	370	27.4	−6.9
Conservative	Julie Whitmore	349	25.9	+3.4
Green	James Brooks	42	3.1	+3.1
Liberal Democrats	James Morton	37	2.7	−0.3
Rejected ballots		9		
Majority		171	12.7	
Turnout		1348		
Labour hold		Swing		

Heanor East
Party	Candidate	Votes	%	±%
Labour	Sheila Oakes	536	38.2	−4.8
Conservative	Mark Burrell	425	30.3	+4.3
UKIP	Philip Rose	342	24.4	−3.7
Green	Julie Wozniczka	49	3.5	+3.5
Liberal Democrats	George White	42	3.0	0.0
Rejected ballots		10		
Majority		111	7.9	
Turnout		1404		
Labour hold		Swing		

Heanor West
Party	Candidate	Votes	%	±%
Labour	Teresa Curran	597	42.2	+1.8
Conservative	Steven Grainger	401	28.4	+5.4
UKIP	Chris Flude	325	23.0	−9.5
Liberal Democrats	Joel Hunt	43	3.0	−1.1
Green	Mike Jones	38	2.7	+2.7
Rejected ballots		10		
Majority		196	13.8	
Turnout		1414		
Labour hold		Swing		

Ironville and Riddings
Party	Candidate	Votes	%	±%
Conservative	Jack Brown	630	40.7	+8.8
Labour	Paul Wardle	616	39.8	−8.1
UKIP	Stuart Bent	227	14.7	−3.2
Green	Steve Kennedy	37	2.4	+2.4
Liberal Democrats	Ollie Smith	30	1.9	−0.4
Rejected ballots		8		
Majority		14	0.9	
Turnout		1548		
Conservative gain from Labour		Swing		

Kilburn, Denby and Holbrook
Party	Candidate	Votes	%	±%
Conservative	Charles Norman Bull	1086	47.5	−2.2
Labour	Christine Venables	691	30.2	+3.0
UKIP	Roy Snape	312	13.6	−1.3
Green	Kate Howard	102	4.5	−0.1
Liberal Democrats	Ron Welsby	90	3.9	+0.2
Rejected ballots		7		
Majority		395	17.3	
Turnout		2288		
Conservative hold		Swing		

Langley Mill & Aldercar
Party	Candidate	Votes	%	±%
Labour	Brian Gration	486	43.5	−0.1
Conservative	Rosie Webster	363	32.5	+8.7
UKIP	Tony Warren	219	19.6	−10.6
Green	Christina Smith	15	1.3	+1.3
Liberal Democrats	Ruth Thornton	14	1.3	−1.2
National Front	Timothy Knowles	14	1.3	+1.3
Rejected ballots		5		
Majority		123	11.0	
Turnout		1116		
Labour hold		Swing		

Ripley & Marehay
Party	Candidate	Votes	%	±%
Labour	Mick Wilson	640	41.9	+5.6
Conservative	Matt Murray	560	36.6	−5.9
UKIP	John Pass	237	15.5	+0.3
Green	Tony Youens	46	3.0	−0.6
Liberal Democrats	Clym Stock-Williams	25	1.6	−0.8
National Front	Michael Sharpe	15	1.0	+1.0
Rejected ballots		5		
Majority		80	5.3	
Turnout		1528		
Labour hold		Swing		

Ripley
Party	Candidate	Votes	%	±%
Labour	Tony Holmes	869	40.1	+5.4
Conservative	Sean Carter	845	39.0	−1.6
UKIP	Paula Parkin	345	15.9	−2.0
Green	Phil Taylor	55	2.5	−1.1
Liberal Democrats	Peter Jelf	43	2.0	−1.1
Rejected ballots		8		
Majority		24	1.1	
Turnout		2165		
Labour hold		Swing		

Shipley Park, Horsley and Horsley Woodhouse
Party	Candidate	Votes	%	±%
Conservative	Alex Stevenson	945	51.6	+10.8
Labour	Antony Tester	404	22.1	+1.7
UKIP	Ade Nathan	348	19.0	−9.2
Green	Matt McGuinness	68	3.7	+3.7
Liberal Democrats	Kate Smith	56	3.1	−2.0
Rejected ballots		10		
Majority		541	29.5	
Turnout		1831		
Conservative hold		Swing		

Somercotes
Party	Candidate	Votes	%	±%
Labour	John McCabe	735	58.4	+1.5
UKIP	Paul Price	291	23.1	−1.5
Conservative	Colin Boyce	165	13.1	−2.0
Green	Steve Elliott	32	2.5	+2.5
Liberal Democrats	Elsie Situnayake	29	2.3	−1.0
Rejected ballots		6		
Majority		444	25.3	
Turnout		1258		
Labour hold		Swing		
