= 2010 Amber Valley Borough Council election =

2010 UK local government election

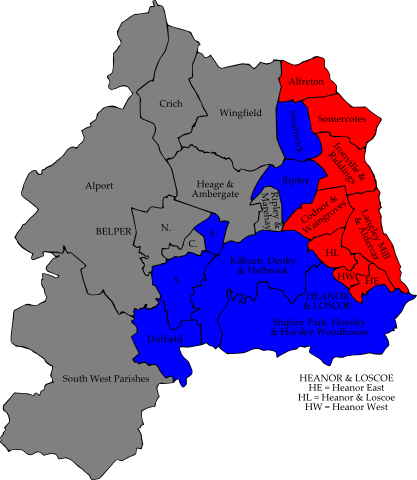
Map of the results of the 2010 Amber Valley council election. Labour in red and Conservatives in blue. Wards in grey were not contested in 2010.

The 2010 Amber Valley Borough Council election took place on 6 May 2010 to elect members of Amber Valley Borough Council in Derbyshire, England. One third of the council was up for election and the Conservative Party stayed in overall control of the council.

After the election, the composition of the council was:

- Conservative 29
- Labour 14
- British National Party 2

== Campaign ==
15 seats were contested in the election by a total of 50 candidates.

The Conservatives campaigned on their record of controlling the council for the previous 10 years, pointing to keeping council tax increases low and plans to regenerate local towns. However Labour pledged to appoint people as area managers who would be a contact point for people to bring any problems and planned to use compulsory purchase orders to bring empty properties into use. Meanwhile, the Liberal Democrats targeted seats in Belper and Duffield campaigning on regeneration, recycling and litter, while the British National Party hoped to increase on the 2 seats they held in Heanor.

== Election result ==
The results saw no change in the party balance as Labour held the 8 seats they had been defending and the Conservatives the other 7 seats, meaning the Conservatives remained in control of the council. Neither the Liberal Democrats or British National Party won any seats, with the British National Party vote dropping in Heanor where it held 2 seats.

Amber Valley local election result 2010
Party	Seats	Gains	Losses	Net gain/loss	Seats %	Votes %	Votes	+/−
Labour	8	0	0	0	53.3	35.8	17,024	+2.9%
Conservative	7	0	0	0	46.7	40.2	19,154	-7.6%
Liberal Democrats	0	0	0	0	0	17.5	8,352	+12.4%
BNP	0	0	0	0	0	5.7	2,725	-6.5%
National Front	0	0	0	0	0	0.4	185	+0.4%
Independent	0	0	0	0	0	0.3	164	+0.3%

== Ward results ==
Alfreton
Party	Candidate	Votes	%	±%
Labour	John Walker	1,805	47.7	−0.5
Conservative	David Cantrill	1,094	28.9	−11.5
Liberal Democrats	Kieran Harley	566	15.0	+3.6
BNP	Michael White	319	8.4	+8.4
Majority		711	18.8	+11.0
Turnout		3,784		
Labour hold		Swing		

Belper East
Party	Candidate	Votes	%	±%
Conservative	Martin Tomlinson	1,533	47.9	−4.7
Liberal Democrats	Timothy Clark	848	26.5	+8.2
Labour	Ben Bellamy	818	25.6	−3.5
Majority		685	21.4	
Turnout		3,199		
Conservative hold		Swing		

Belper South
Party	Candidate	Votes	%	±%
Conservative	Jim Anderson	1,247	43.0	−6.5
Liberal Democrats	Emily Bamford	840	28.9	+28.9
Labour	Richard Salmon	816	28.1	−2.9
Majority		407	14.0	−4.5
Turnout		2,903		
Conservative hold		Swing		

Codnor and Waingroves
Party	Candidate	Votes	%	±%
Labour	George Parkes	1,159	43.3	+1.6
Conservative	Robert Phillips-Forsyth	1,127	42.1	+0.4
BNP	Ken Cooper	391	14.6	−2.0
Majority		32	1.2	+1.2
Turnout		2,677		
Labour hold		Swing		

Duffield
Party	Candidate	Votes	%	±%
Conservative	Chris Short	1,768	60.2	−3.5
Liberal Democrats	Colin Thompson	1,169	39.8	+24.5
Majority		599	20.4	−22.3
Turnout		2,937		
Conservative hold		Swing		

Heanor and Loscoe
Party	Candidate	Votes	%	±%
Labour	Bob Moon	1,264	46.4	+10.8
Conservative	Janet Russell	874	32.1	+3.2
BNP	Paul Snell	584	21.5	−14.0
Majority		390	14.3	+14.2
Turnout		2,722		
Labour hold		Swing		

Heanor East
Party	Candidate	Votes	%	±%
Labour	Barry Aistrop	1,038	35.9	+5.1
Conservative	Alex Stevenson	965	33.3	+0.6
BNP	Emma Roper	451	15.6	−20.9
Liberal Democrats	Peter Jelf	440	15.2	+15.2
Majority		73	2.6	
Turnout		2,894		
Labour hold		Swing		

Heanor West
Party	Candidate	Votes	%	±%
Labour	Paul Jones	1,160	37.6	+7.1
Conservative	Linda Edwards-Milsom	970	31.4	+9.0
BNP	Maria Riley-Ward	542	17.6	−22.0
Liberal Democrats	Gavin Sarkas-Bosman	416	13.5	+6.0
Majority		190	6.2	
Turnout		3,088		
Labour hold		Swing		

Ironville and Riddings
Party	Candidate	Votes	%	±%
Labour	Paul Smith	1,457	48.7	+7.3
Conservative	David Harrison	1,087	36.3	−22.3
Liberal Democrats	Judith Woolley	448	15.0	+15.0
Majority		370	12.4	
Turnout		2,992		
Labour hold		Swing		

Kilburn, Denby and Holbrook
Party	Candidate	Votes	%	±%
Conservative	Jean Gemmell	2,097	48.6	−6.6
Labour	John Banks	1,352	31.3	+11.0
Liberal Democrats	Margaret Tomkins	869	20.1	+7.3
Majority		745	17.3	−17.6
Turnout		4,318		
Conservative hold		Swing		

Langley Mill and Aldercar
Party	Candidate	Votes	%	±%
Labour	Eileen Hamilton	931	38.4	−4.4
Conservative	Liam Rhodes	753	31.1	−13.2
Liberal Democrats	Christopher Bown	390	16.1	+3.2
National Front	Timothy Knowles	185	7.6	+7.6
Independent	Jo Ward	164	6.8	+6.8
Majority		178	7.3	
Turnout		2,423		
Labour hold		Swing		

Ripley
Party	Candidate	Votes	%	±%
Conservative	Liz Bowley	1,779	39.4	−20.4
Labour	David Williams	1,662	36.8	+6.1
Liberal Democrats	Paul Gibbons	635	14.1	+4.6
BNP	Nathan Wilde	438	9.7	+9.7
Majority		117	2.6	−26.5
Turnout		4,514		
Conservative hold		Swing		

Shipley Park, Horsley and Horsley Woodhouse
Party	Candidate	Votes	%	±%
Conservative	Kevin Parkinson	1,491	44.7	−20.4
Labour	Eric Lancashire	1,112	33.4	−1.5
Liberal Democrats	Neil Paget	729	21.9	+21.9
Majority		379	11.4	−18.8
Turnout		3,332		
Conservative hold		Swing		

Somercotes
Party	Candidate	Votes	%	±%
Labour	Brian Lyttle	1,443	54.9	+6.3
Conservative	Kat Moss	759	28.9	+0.3
Liberal Democrats	Keith Falconbridge	427	16.2	+16.2
Majority		684	26.0	+6.0
Turnout		2,629		
Labour hold		Swing		

Swanwick
Party	Candidate	Votes	%	±%
Conservative	Allen King	1,610	50.4	+11.7
Labour	Timothy Benson	983	30.8	+15.5
Liberal Democrats	Michael Bedford	599	18.8	+14.3
Majority		627	19.6	+15.1
Turnout		3,192		
Conservative hold		Swing		
