= 2022 Amber Valley Borough Council election =

2022 local election in Amber Valley

2022 Amber Valley Borough Council Election
- 5 May 2022

15 of 45 seats for Amber Valley Borough Council 23 seats needed for a majority
	First party	Second party	Third party
Party	Conservative	Labour	Green
Last election	28	16	1
Seats won	9	4	2
Seats after	30	11	3
Seat change	▲2	▼4	▲2
Popular vote	10,236	8,744	3,916
Percentage	42.6%	36.4%	16.3%
- Results of the 2022 Amber Valley Borough Council election by ward

The elections to Amber Valley Borough Council in Derbyshire, England took place on Thursday 5 May 2022. One third of the council were up for election. The Conservatives increased their majority on the council whilst the Green Party also gained seats.

This election was the last by thirds election and the last before boundary changes proposed by the Local Government Boundary Commission came into effect at the 2023 election. Councillors elected this year served for a period of one year.

== Results summary ==
2022 Amber Valley Borough Council Election
Party	This election				Full council			This election		
Party	Candidates	Seats	Net	Seats %	Other	Total	Total %	Votes	Votes %	+/−
Conservative	{{{candidates}}}	9	▲2	60.0	21	30	66.7	10,236	42.6	-11.0
Labour	{{{candidates}}}	4	▼4	26.7	7	11	24.4	8,744	36.4	+0.9
Green	{{{candidates}}}	2	▲2	13.3	1	3	6.7	3,916	16.3	+8.7
Liberal Democrats	{{{candidates}}}	0	Steady	0.0	0	0	0.0	1,076	4.5	+1.2
National Front	{{{candidates}}}	0	Steady	0.0	0	0	0.0	28	0.0	±0.0
SDP	{{{candidates}}}	0	Steady	0.0	0	0	0.0	21	0.0	±0.0

== Council composition ==
Following the last election in 2021, the composition of the council was:

↓
28	16	1
Conservative	Labour	Grn

After the election, the composition of the council was:

↓
30	11	3	1
Conservative	Labour	Green	Ind

Independent caused by Neil Ploughman for Belper Central leaving The Labour Party in 2021

== Ward results ==
Percentage change is from the 2018 Amber Valley Borough Council Election.

=== Alfreton ===
Alfreton (1 Seat)
Party	Candidate	Votes	%	±%
Labour	Steve Marshall-Clarke	852	50.5	▼8.9
Conservative	Jonty Powis	629	37.3	▲4.1
Liberal Democrats	Paul Robin Gibbons	106	6.3	▲3.4
Green	Russ Hubber	100	5.9	▲1.4
Majority		223	13.2	
Turnout		1,687	25	
Labour hold		Swing		

=== Belper East ===
Belper East (1 Seat)
Party	Candidate	Votes	%	±%
Labour	Fay Atkinson	758	45.4	▲0.5
Conservative	Mark Edward Robertson	589	35.3	▼6.3
Green	Kendal Greaves	172	10.3	▲5.9
Liberal Democrats	James Morrissey	150	9.0	▼0.1
Majority		169	10.1	
Turnout		1,669	36	
Labour hold		Swing		

=== Belper South ===
Belper South (1 Seat)
Party	Candidate	Votes	%	±%
Green	Jamie Alexander Walls	973	54.9	▲47.3
Conservative	Daniel James Kerry	385	21.7	▼15.3
Labour	Joel Martin Bryan	381	21.5	▼26.2
Liberal Democrats	Richard Alan Salmon	34	1.9	▼1.6
Majority		588	33.2	
Turnout		1,773	41	
Green gain from Labour		Swing		

=== Codnor and Waingroves ===
Codnor and Waingroves (1 Seat)
Party	Candidate	Votes	%	±%
Labour	Christopher Emmas-Williams	681	51.8	▲0.6
Conservative	Mark Neil O'Malley	524	39.8	▼5.9
Green	David Martin Hatchett	72	5.5	▲5.5
Liberal Democrats	Jeremy Quentin Miles	38	2.9	▼0.3
Majority		157	12.0	
Turnout		1,315	33	
Labour hold		Swing		

=== Duffield ===
Duffield (1 Seat)
Party	Candidate	Votes	%	±%
Green	Alison Jane McDermott	1,474	69.8	▲35.7
Conservative	Pippa Rowen	508	24.1	▼23.9
Labour	Mark Spilsbury	102	4.8	▼7.2
Liberal Democrats	Sue Allen	28	1.3	▼4.6
Majority		966	45.7	
Turnout		2,112	54	
Green gain from Conservative		Swing		

=== Heanor and Loscoe ===
Heanor and Loscoe (1 Seat)
Party	Candidate	Votes	%	±%
Conservative	Nikki Savage	560	49.8	▲4.3
Labour	Kieran James Denbygh Hill	435	38.7	▼9.3
Green	James Major John Brooks	77	6.9	▲2.5
Liberal Democrats	Kate Smith	52	4.6	▲2.5
Majority		125	11.1	
Turnout		1,124	28	
Conservative gain from Labour		Swing		

=== Heanor East ===
Heanor East (1 Seat)
Party	Candidate	Votes	%	±%
Conservative	Henry William Thompson	669	52.3	▲2.5
Labour	Janet Irene Ward	451	35.2	▼8.2
Green	Cathie Hallsworth	105	8.2	▲8.2
Liberal Democrats	Jerry Marler	55	4.3	▼2.5
Majority		218	17.1	
Turnout		1,280	28	
Conservative hold		Swing		

=== Heanor West ===
Heanor West (1 Seat)
Party	Candidate	Votes	%	±%
Conservative	Steven Grainger	658	48.2	▲1.5
Labour	Steve Bower	556	40.7	▼4.1
Green	Tina Pritchard	90	6.6	▲1.4
Liberal Democrats	Michael John Heap	61	4.5	▲1.2
Majority		102	7.5	
Turnout		1,365	28	
Conservative hold		Swing		

=== Ironville and Riddings ===
Ironville and Riddings (1 Seat)
Party	Candidate	Votes	%	±%
Conservative	Pete Clark	707	47.1	▲5.4
Labour	Paul Christopher Wardle	648	43.2	▼11.2
Green	Rachael Hatchett	96	6.4	▲6.4
Liberal Democrats	Kate Mary Kift	50	3.3	▼0.6
Majority		59	3.9	
Turnout		1,501	32	
Conservative gain from Labour		Swing		

=== Kilburn, Denby and Holbrook ===
Kilburn, Denby and Holbrook (1 Seat)
Party	Candidate	Votes	%	±%
Conservative	Trevor Mark Ainsworth	1,163	50.9	▼6.5
Labour	Keith Lisle Venables	763	33.4	▼0.1
Green	Cathy Kinsella	267	11.7	▲7.5
Liberal Democrats	Chris Gent	92	4.0	▼0.8
Majority		400	17.5	
Turnout		2,285	37	
Conservative hold		Swing		

=== Langley Mill and Aldercar ===
Langley Mill and Aldercar (1 Seat)
Party	Candidate	Votes	%	±%
Conservative	Sheena Edith Trower	530	49.9	▲5.5
Labour	Eileen Hamilton	450	42.3	▼6.4
Liberal Democrats	Joanna Elizabeth Karpasea	55	5.2	▲1.1
National Front	Timothy Knowles	28	2.6	▼0.1
Majority		80	3.3	
Turnout		1,063	25	
Conservative gain from Labour		Swing		

=== Ripley ===
Ripley (1 Seat)
Party	Candidate	Votes	%	±%
Conservative	Sean David Carter	1,065	45.7	▼3.9
Labour	Tony Holmes	987	42.4	▼1.2
Green	Michael Peter Bedford	147	6.7	▲3.6
Liberal Democrats	Richard William Smeeton	99	4.3	▲0.6
SDP	Edwin George Dale Taylor	21	0.9	▲0.9
Majority		78	3.3	
Turnout		2,319	33	
Conservative hold		Swing		

=== Shipley Park, Horsley and Horsley Woodhouse ===
Shipley Park, Horsley and Horsley Woodhouse (1 Seat)
Party	Candidate	Votes	%	±%
Conservative	Richard Henry Iliffe	1,010	55.7	▼8.6
Labour	Amina Sabeah Deen Burslem	483	26.6	▲2.7
Green	Lian Pizzey	213	11.7	▲6.4
Liberal Democrats	Adrian James Miller	108	6.0	▼0.4
Majority		552	29.1	
Turnout		1,814	36	
Conservative hold		Swing		

=== Somercotes ===
Somercotes (1 Seat)
Party	Candidate	Votes	%	±%
Labour	Katie Simpson	682	59.8	▼6.8
Conservative	Paul Price	407	35.7	▲5.5
Liberal Democrats	Paul Slater	51	4.5	▲1.4
Majority		275	24.1	
Turnout		1,140	25	
Labour hold		Swing		

=== Swanwick ===
Swanwick (1 Seat)
Party	Candidate	Votes	%	±%
Conservative	David Wilson	832	52.9	▼6.7
Labour	Matt Allwood	515	32.7	▲5.8
Green	Steve Elliott	130	8.3	▲1.8
Liberal Democrats	Malvin Leslie Trigg	97	6.2	▼0.8
Majority		317	20.2	
Turnout		1,574	37	
Conservative hold		Swing		

=== By-elections ===
==== Wingfield ====
Wingfield: 15 December 2022
Party	Candidate	Votes	%	
Conservative	Dawn Harper	242	54.9	▼13.9
Liberal Democrats	Kate Smith	114	25.9	▲21.4
Labour	Dean Watson	53	12.0	▼7.2
Green	Sally Lowick	32	7.3	▼0.2
Majority		128	29.0	
Turnout		441	23.0	
Conservative hold		Swing		

The Wingfield by-election was triggered by the death of councillor Valerie Thorpe.
