= 2003 Amber Valley Borough Council election =

2003 UK local government election

Map of the results of the 2003 Amber Valley council election. Conservatives in blue and Labour in red. Wards in grey were not contested in 2003.

Elections to Amber Valley Borough Council were held on 1 May 2003. One third of the council was up for election and the Conservative Party held overall control of the council.

After the election, the composition of the council was:

- Conservative 25
- Labour 20

== Election result ==
Amber Valley local election result 2003
Party	Seats	Gains	Losses	Net gain/loss	Seats %	Votes %	Votes	+/−
Conservative	12			-1	80.0	53.2	9,734	+16.1%
Labour	3			+1	20.0	37.0	6,770	-15.5%
Liberal Democrats	0			0	0	7.6	1,386	+2.0%
Independent	0			0	0	2.2	411	-2.2%

== Ward results ==
Alfreton
Party	Candidate	Votes	%	±%
Labour	Gillian Dolman	716	54.1	
Conservative	David Wilson	450	34.0	
Liberal Democrats	Paul Gibbons	158	11.9	
Majority		266	20.1	
Turnout		1,324		

Alport
Party	Candidate	Votes	%	±%
Conservative	Deborah Biss	629	70.4	
Labour	Tony Munro	142	15.9	
Liberal Democrats	Peter Handscombe	123	13.8	
Majority		487	54.5	
Turnout		894		

Belper Central
Party	Candidate	Votes	%	±%
Conservative	Peter Makin	711	59.0	
Labour	Brenda Remington	494	41.0	
Majority		217	18.0	
Turnout		1,205		

Belper East
Party	Candidate	Votes	%	±%
Conservative	Leslie Dorey	553	49.1	+2.5
Labour	Alan Broughton	411	36.5	−7.1
Liberal Democrats	Timothy Clark	162	14.4	+14.4
Majority		142	12.6	+9.6
Turnout		1,126		

Belper North
Party	Candidate	Votes	%	±%
Conservative	Simon Hitchcock	660	52.2	
Labour	Peter Shepherd	364	28.8	
Liberal Democrats	Roger Shelley	147	11.6	
Independent	Margaret Jackson	94	7.4	
Majority		296	23.4	
Turnout		1,265		

Belper South
Party	Candidate	Votes	%	±%
Conservative	Peter Arnold	614	56.3	+6.3
Labour	Ronald Buzzard	476	43.7	−6.3
Majority		138	12.6	+12.5
Turnout		1,090		

Crich
Party	Candidate	Votes	%	±%
Conservative	Glyn Hartshorne	450	62.8	
Labour	Kenneth Armstrong	134	18.7	
Liberal Democrats	Catherine Smith	132	18.4	
Majority		316	44.1	
Turnout		716		

Duffield
Party	Candidate	Votes	%	±%
Conservative	Anthony Woodings	851	57.3	−2.8
Labour	Patrick Mountain	318	21.4	−18.5
Liberal Democrats	Deena Smith	316	21.3	+21.3
Majority		433	35.9	+15.7
Turnout		1,485		

Heage and Ambergate
Party	Candidate	Votes	%	±%
Labour	Maurice Gent	739	51.3	
Conservative	Juliette Blake	559	38.8	
Liberal Democrats	Anthony Cooper	142	9.9	
Majority		180	12.5	
Turnout		1,440		

Kilburn, Denby and Holbrook
Party	Candidate	Votes	%	±%
Conservative	Albert Hall	845	47.2	+5.6
Labour	Susan Reaney	741	41.4	−2.9
Liberal Democrats	Jeremy Benson	206	11.5	−2.6
Majority		104	5.8	+3.1
Turnout		1,792		

Ripley
Party	Candidate	Votes	%	±%
Conservative	Kathleen Brown	890	50.2	
Labour	Walter Fryer	882	49.8	
Majority		8	0.4	
Turnout		1,772		

Ripley and Marehay
Party	Candidate	Votes	%	±%
Labour	Geoffrey Carlile	627	53.1	
Conservative	Patricia Bowmar	404	34.2	
Independent	Alex Stevenson	150	12.7	
Majority		223	18.9	
Turnout		1,181		

South West Parishes
Party	Candidate	Votes	%	±%
Conservative	John Cunningham	750	85.4	
Labour	Diana Hancock	128	14.6	
Majority		622	70.8	
Turnout		878		

Swanwick
Party	Candidate	Votes	%	±%
Conservative	Stephen Hayes	733	55.9	−6.2
Labour	Paul Smith	411	31.4	−6.5
Independent	John Pidcock	167	12.7	+12.7
Majority		322	24.5	
Turnout		1,311		

Wingfield
Party	Candidate	Votes	%	±%
Conservative	Valerie Thorpe	635	77.3	
Labour	Graham Naylor	187	22.7	
Majority		448	54.6	
Turnout		822		
