= 2004 Amber Valley Borough Council election =

2004 UK local government election

Map of the results of the 2004 Amber Valley council election. Conservatives in blue and Labour in red. Wards in grey were not contested in 2004.

Elections to Amber Valley Borough Council were held on 10 June 2004. One third of the council was up for election and the Conservative Party held overall control of the council. Overall turnout was 44%.

After the election, the composition of the council was:

- Conservative – 24
- Labour – 21

== Election result ==
Amber Valley local election result 2004
Party	Seats	Gains	Losses	Net gain/loss	Seats %	Votes %	Votes	+/−
Conservative	8	0	1	-1	53.3	43.2	13,224	-10.0%
Labour	7	1	0	+1	46.7	43.0	13,167	+6.0%
Liberal Democrats	0	0	0	0	0	9.8	3,000	+2.2%
BNP	0	0	0	0	0	2.7	811	+2.7%
Independent	0	0	0	0	0	1.3	399	-0.9%

== Ward results ==
Alfreton
Party	Candidate	Votes	%	±%
Labour	Bennett Marlene	1,198	47.3	−6.8
Conservative	David Wilson	738	29.1	−4.9
Liberal Democrats	Paul Gibbons	598	23.6	+11.7
Majority		460	18.2	−1.9
Turnout		2,565	41	
Labour hold		Swing		

Belper Central
Party	Candidate	Votes	%	±%
Conservative	John Nelson	1,107	59.7	+0.7
Labour	Ronald Buzzard	746	40.3	−0.7
Majority		361	19.4	+1.4
Turnout		1,853	46	
Conservative hold		Swing		

Belper North
Party	Candidate	Votes	%	±%
Conservative	Alan Cox	1,012	47.9	−4.3
Labour	Peter Shepherd	535	25.3	−3.5
Liberal Democrats	Roger Shelley	438	20.7	+9.1
Independent	Steven Broughton	128	6.1	−1.3
Majority		477	22.6	−0.8
Turnout		2,113	53	
Conservative hold		Swing		

Codnor & Waingroves
Party	Candidate	Votes	%	±%
Labour	Christopher Emmas-Williams	1,029	58.6	−8.3
Conservative	Patricia Bowmar	728	41.4	+8.3
Majority		301	17.2	−16.6
Turnout		1,757	45	
Labour hold		Swing		

Heage & Ambergate
Party	Candidate	Votes	%	±%
Conservative	Albert Wilde	934	48.7	+9.9
Labour	Stella Ragsdale	578	30.1	−21.2
Liberal Democrats	Anthony Cooper	406	21.2	+11.3
Majority		356	18.6	
Turnout		1,918	49	
Conservative hold		Swing		

Heanor & Loscoe
Party	Candidate	Votes	%	±%
Labour	Tony Munro	905	53.9	−11.9
Conservative	Christopher Jubb	774	46.1	+11.9
Majority		131	7.8	−23.8
Turnout		1,679	42	
Labour hold		Swing		

Heanor East
Party	Candidate	Votes	%	±%
Labour	Kenneth Armstrong	1,147	64.9	+11.1
Conservative	Linda Edwards-Milsom	619	35.1	+8.4
Majority		528	29.8	+2.7
Turnout		1,766	41	
Labour gain from Conservative		Swing		

Heanor West
Party	Candidate	Votes	%	±%
Labour	Celia Cox	683	34.7	−12.4
BNP	David Orme	515	26.2	+26.2
Conservative	Jade Wiltshire	451	22.9	+2.3
Liberal Democrats	Gavin Sarkas-Bosman	320	16.3	−16.0
Majority		168	8.5	−6.3
Turnout		1,969	45	
Labour hold		Swing		

Ironville & Riddings
Party	Candidate	Votes	%	±%
Conservative	Jack Brown	1,066	55.8	−2.3
Labour	Paul Smith	845	44.2	+2.3
Majority		221	11.6	−4.6
Turnout		1,911	42	
Conservative hold		Swing		

Kilburn, Denby & Holbrook
Party	Candidate	Votes	%	±%
Conservative	Charles Bull	1,363	47.3	+0.1
Labour	Sasann Reaney	965	33.5	−7.9
Liberal Democrats	Jeremy Benson	553	19.2	+7.7
Majority		398	13.8	+8.0
Turnout		2,881	47	
Conservative hold		Swing		

Langley Mill & Aldercar
Party	Candidate	Votes	%	±%
Labour	David Mickleburgh	818	54.5	−4.7
Conservative	Terence Thorpe	278	18.5	−5.0
Independent	Timothy Knowles	271	18.0	+0.6
Liberal Democrats	Keith Falconbridge	135	9.0	+9.0
Majority		540	36.0	+0.3
Turnout		1,502	40	
Labour hold		Swing		

Ripley
Party	Candidate	Votes	%	±%
Conservative	David Bowley	1,418	49.1	−1.1
Labour	Walter Fryer	921	31.9	−17.9
Liberal Democrats	Catharine Smith	550	19.0	+19.0
Majority		497	17.2	+16.8
Turnout		2,889	43	
Conservative hold		Swing		

Ripley & Marehay
Party	Candidate	Votes	%	±%
Conservative	Linda Cope	972	50.8	+16.6
Labour	Michael Missett	941	49.2	−3.9
Majority		31	1.6	
Turnout		1,913	44	
Conservative hold		Swing		

Shipley Park, Horsley & Horsley Woodhouse
Party	Candidate	Votes	%	±%
Conservative	Nigel Mills	1,308	58.5	+21.8
Labour	Leslie Foster	929	41.5	−5.4
Majority		379	17.0	
Turnout		2,237	50	
Conservative hold		Swing		

Somercotes
Party	Candidate	Votes	%	±%
Labour	John McCabe	927	55.2	−20.7
Conservative	Sally West	456	27.2	+3.1
BNP	Steven Belshaw	296	17.6	+17.6
Majority		471	28.0	
Turnout		1,679	38	
Labour hold		Swing		
