= 2007 Amber Valley Borough Council election =

2007 UK local government election

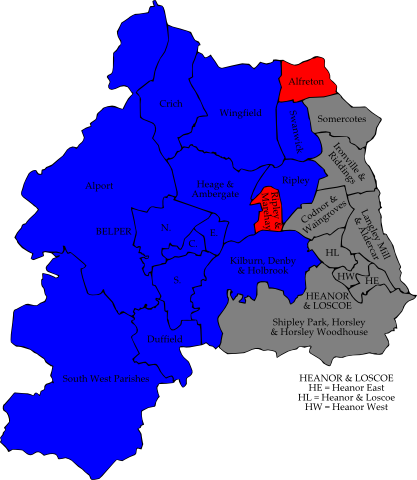
Map of the results of the 2007 Amber Valley council election. Conservatives in blue and Labour in red. Wards in grey were not contested in 2007.

Elections to Amber Valley Borough Council were held on 3 May 2007. One third of the council was up for election and the Conservative Party held overall control of the council. Overall turnout was 37.7%.

After the election, the composition of the council was:

- Conservative 28
- Labour 17

== Election result ==
Amber Valley local election result 2007
| Party | Seats | Gains | Losses | Net gain/loss | Seats % | Votes % | Votes | +/− |
|---|---|---|---|---|---|---|---|---|
| Conservative | 13 | 1 | 0 | +1 | 86.7 | 48.5 | 10,503 | +5.3% |
| Labour | 2 | 0 | 1 | -1 | 13.3 | 29.4 | 6,378 | -10.0% |
| Liberal Democrats | 0 | 0 | 0 | 0 | 0 | 13.1 | 2,848 | +13.1% |
| BNP | 0 | 0 | 0 | 0 | 0 | 4.8 | 1,048 | +0.1% |
| Independent | 0 | 0 | 0 | 0 | 0 | 2.9 | 634 | +2.9% |
| Green | 0 | 0 | 0 | 0 | 0 | 1.2 | 260 | +0.1% |

1 Conservative candidate was unopposed.

== Ward results ==
Alfreton
| Party | Candidate | Votes | % | ±% |
|---|---|---|---|---|
| Labour | Gail Dolman | 1,003 | 48.5 | −7.3 |
| Conservative | Paul West | 527 | 25.5 | −4.6 |
| BNP | Michael White | 344 | 16.6 | +16.6 |
| Liberal Democrats | Keith Falconbridge | 196 | 9.5 | +9.5 |
| Majority | | 476 | 23.0 | −2.7 |
| Turnout | | 2,070 | 33.6 | +3.6 |
| Labour hold | | Swing | | |

Alport
| Party | Candidate | Votes | % | ±% |
|---|---|---|---|---|
| Conservative | Deborah Biss | 710 | 78.2 | +7.8 |
| Labour | Sue Reaney | 198 | 21.8 | +5.9 |
| Majority | | 512 | 56.4 | +1.9 |
| Turnout | | 908 | 45.3 | |
| Conservative hold | | Swing | | |

Belper Central
| Party | Candidate | Votes | % | ±% |
|---|---|---|---|---|
| Conservative | Peter Makin | 781 | 52.6 | −7.1 |
| Labour | Peter Shepard | 479 | 32.3 | −8.0 |
| Liberal Democrats | Janet Thompson | 225 | 15.2 | +15.2 |
| Majority | | 302 | 20.3 | +0.9 |
| Turnout | | 1,485 | 36.1 | −9.9 |
| Conservative hold | | Swing | | |

Belper East
| Party | Candidate | Votes | % | ±% |
|---|---|---|---|---|
| Conservative | Les Dorey | 688 | 52.6 | +1.7 |
| Labour | Randall Sanders | 381 | 29.1 | +0.3 |
| Liberal Democrats | Timothy Clark | 240 | 18.3 | +18.3 |
| Majority | | 307 | 23.5 | +1.4 |
| Turnout | | 1,309 | 29.7 | −1.3 |
| Conservative hold | | Swing | | |

Belper North
| Party | Candidate | Votes | % | ±% |
|---|---|---|---|---|
| Conservative | Barry Lewis | 641 | 40.8 | −7.1 |
| Liberal Democrats | Hassan Dervish | 569 | 36.2 | +36.2 |
| Labour | Joyce Sanders | 362 | 23.0 | −2.3 |
| Majority | | 72 | 4.6 | −18.0 |
| Turnout | | 1,572 | 39.6 | −13.4 |
| Conservative hold | | Swing | | |

Belper South
| Party | Candidate | Votes | % | ±% |
|---|---|---|---|---|
| Conservative | Peter Arnold | 658 | 49.5 | +6.2 |
| Labour | Ron Buzzard | 412 | 31.0 | −1.5 |
| Green | Dave Wells | 260 | 19.5 | +6.2 |
| Majority | | 246 | 18.5 | +7.7 |
| Turnout | | 1,330 | 34.1 | +2.1 |
| Conservative hold | | Swing | | |

Crich
| Party | Candidate | Votes | % | ±% |
|---|---|---|---|---|
| Conservative | Gill Taylor | 508 | 61.1 | −1.7 |
| Liberal Democrats | Kate Smith | 202 | 24.3 | +24.3 |
| Labour | Janis Gregory | 121 | 14.6 | −4.1 |
| Majority | | 306 | 36.8 | −7.3 |
| Turnout | | 831 | 42.9 | |
| Conservative hold | | Swing | | |

Duffield
| Party | Candidate | Votes | % | ±% |
|---|---|---|---|---|
| Conservative | Stuart Bradford | 1,005 | 63.7 | −1.2 |
| Labour | Di Hancock | 331 | 21.0 | +7.6 |
| Liberal Democrats | Colin Thompson | 242 | 15.3 | +15.3 |
| Majority | | 674 | 42.7 | −6.5 |
| Turnout | | 1,578 | 42.8 | −0.2 |
| Conservative hold | | Swing | | |

Heage & Ambergate
| Party | Candidate | Votes | % | ±% |
|---|---|---|---|---|
| Conservative | Angela Ward | 878 | 56.3 | +7.6 |
| Labour | Christine Worth | 477 | 30.6 | +0.5 |
| Liberal Democrats | Margaret Tomkins | 205 | 13.1 | +13.1 |
| Majority | | 401 | 25.7 | +7.1 |
| Turnout | | 1,560 | 39.6 | −9.4 |
| Conservative gain from Labour | | Swing | | |

Kilburn, Denby & Holbrook
| Party | Candidate | Votes | % | ±% |
|---|---|---|---|---|
| Conservative | Mel Hall | 1,098 | 47.3 | −16.0 |
| Labour | Terry Foster | 571 | 24.6 | −12.1 |
| BNP | Alan Warner | 372 | 16.0 | +16.0 |
| Liberal Democrats | John Banks | 281 | 12.1 | +12.1 |
| Majority | | 527 | 22.7 | −3.9 |
| Turnout | | 2,322 | 38.0 | +2.0 |
| Conservative hold | | Swing | | |

Ripley
| Party | Candidate | Votes | % | ±% |
|---|---|---|---|---|
| Conservative | David Wilson | 965 | 42.9 | −5.4 |
| Labour | Charles Cutting | 925 | 41.1 | +4.3 |
| Liberal Democrats | Michael Bedford | 359 | 16.0 | +16.0 |
| Majority | | 40 | 1.8 | −9.7 |
| Turnout | | 2,249 | 34.3 | +2.3 |
| Conservative hold | | Swing | | |

Ripley & Marehay
| Party | Candidate | Votes | % | ±% |
|---|---|---|---|---|
| Labour | Geoff Carlile | 714 | 42.3 | −6.9 |
| Conservative | Robert Phillips-Forsyth | 597 | 35.3 | −15.5 |
| BNP | Paul Snell | 197 | 11.7 | +11.7 |
| Liberal Democrats | Phil Boothroyd | 181 | 10.7 | +10.7 |
| Majority | | 117 | 7.0 | |
| Turnout | | 1,689 | 36.7 | −7.3 |
| Labour hold | | Swing | | |

South West Parishes
| Party | Candidate | Votes | % | ±% |
|---|---|---|---|---|
| Conservative | Simon Hitchcock | unopposed | | |
| Conservative hold | | Swing | | |

Swanwick
| Party | Candidate | Votes | % | ±% |
|---|---|---|---|---|
| Conservative | Stephen Hayes | 719 | 38.7 | −23.0 |
| Independent | George Soudah | 634 | 34.2 | +34.2 |
| Labour | Isobel Harry | 284 | 15.3 | −9.1 |
| BNP | Clifford Roper | 135 | 7.3 | +7.3 |
| Liberal Democrats | Gordon Monaghan | 84 | 4.5 | +4.5 |
| Majority | | 85 | 4.5 | −32.8 |
| Turnout | | 1,856 | 43.3 | +6.3 |
| Conservative hold | | Swing | | |

Wingfield
| Party | Candidate | Votes | % | ±% |
|---|---|---|---|---|
| Conservative | Valerie Thorpe | 728 | 79.8 | +2.5 |
| Labour | David Williams | 120 | 13.2 | −9.5 |
| Liberal Democrats | Elsie Situnayake | 64 | 7.0 | +7.0 |
| Majority | | 608 | 66.6 | +12.0 |
| Turnout | | 912 | 49.5 | |
| Conservative hold | | Swing | | |
