= 2011 Amber Valley Borough Council election =

2011 UK local government election

Map of the results of the 2011 Amber Valley council election. Conservatives in blue and Labour in red. Wards in grey were not contested in 2011.

The 2011 Amber Valley Borough Council election took place on 5 May 2011 to elect members of Amber Valley Borough Council in Derbyshire, England. One third of the council was up for election and the Conservative Party stayed in overall control of the council.

After the election, the composition of the council was:

- Conservative 28
- Labour 15
- British National Party 2

== Campaign ==
15 seats were contested in the election, mainly from Conservative leaning areas of the council. 1 seat was sure to remain in Conservative hands in South West Parishes after only a Conservative candidate stood for the seat.

The Conservatives pointed to their record in control of the council, Labour pledged to reduce car parking charges, while the Liberal Democrats focused on plans to regenerate Heanor. The parties also disagreed over how to make cuts as a result of a reduction in central government funding, such as over plans to close local offices of the council and to sell the main council headquarters.

== Election result ==
The results saw the Conservative majority remain strong after losing only 1 seat to Labour, leaving the Conservatives with 28 seats compared to 15 for Labour. Labour gained the seat in Heage and Ambergate from the Conservatives, while the closest result came in Ripley where the Conservative held on by 14 votes. Both the Conservative and Labour parties said they were pleased with the results, while neither the Liberal Democrats or the British National Party won any seats. Overall turnout in the election was 45.83%, almost 12% up on when these seats were last contested in 2007.

Amber Valley local election result 2011
Party	Seats	Gains	Losses	Net gain/loss	Seats %	Votes %	Votes	+/−
Conservative	14	0	1	-1	82.4	47.6	14,728	+7.4%
Labour	3	1	0	+1	17.6	38.6	11,922	+2.8%
Liberal Democrats	0	0	0	0	0	5.5	1,708	-12.0%
Independent	0	0	0	0	0	3.1	961	+2.8%
BNP	0	0	0	0	0	2.6	813	-3.1%
Green	0	0	0	0	0	2.6	793	+2.6%

== Ward results ==
Alfreton
Party	Candidate	Votes	%	±%
Labour	Gail Dolman	1,372	58.1	+10.4
Conservative	David Cantrill	747	31.6	+2.7
BNP	Emma Roper	155	6.6	−1.8
Liberal Democrats	Peter Jelf	87	3.7	−11.3
Majority		625	26.5	+7.7
Turnout		2,361	37.6	
Labour hold		Swing		

Alport
Party	Candidate	Votes	%	±%
Conservative	David Taylor	850	70.3	−7.9
Labour	Robert Johnston	359	29.7	+7.9
Majority		491	40.6	−15.8
Turnout		1,209	57.2	+11.9
Conservative hold		Swing		

Belper Central
Party	Candidate	Votes	%	±%
Conservative	Peter Makin	950	47.8	−12.9
Labour	Michael Wilson	609	30.6	+11.2
Green	Dave Wells	428	21.5	+1.7
Majority		341	17.2	−23.7
Turnout		1,987	46.1	+10.9
Conservative hold		Swing		

Belper East
Party	Candidate	Votes	%	±%
Conservative	Jacqueline Cox	845	45.7	−2.2
Labour	Alan Broughton	635	34.4	+8.8
Independent	Les Dorey	368	19.9	+19.9
Majority		210	11.4	−10.0
Turnout		1,848	40.7	
Conservative hold		Swing		

Belper North
Party	Candidate	Votes	%	±%
Conservative	Mark Robertson	838	45.1	−5.9
Labour	Stephen Holden	568	30.6	+12.3
Liberal Democrats	Pamela Bain	310	16.7	−1.1
Green	Mike Whittall	141	7.6	−5.3
Majority		270	14.5	−18.2
Turnout		1,857	46.2	+7.3
Conservative hold		Swing		

Belper South
Party	Candidate	Votes	%	±%
Conservative	Peter Arnold	722	39.8	−3.2
Labour	Erik Johnsen	698	38.5	+10.4
Green	Colin Grimley	224	12.4	+12.4
Liberal Democrats	Richard Salmon	169	9.3	−19.6
Majority		24	1.3	−12.7
Turnout		1,813	41.1	
Conservative hold		Swing		

Crich
Party	Candidate	Votes	%	±%
Conservative	Gareth Gee	531	50.6	−10.5
Labour	Steve Marshall-Clarke	290	27.6	+13.0
Liberal Democrats	Christopher Bown	229	21.8	−2.5
Majority		241	23.0	−13.8
Turnout		1,050	53.0	+10.1
Conservative hold		Swing		

Duffield
Party	Candidate	Votes	%	±%
Conservative	Stuart Bradford	1,279	60.2	+0.0
Labour	Patrick Mountain	568	26.8	+26.8
Liberal Democrats	Colin Thompson	276	13.0	−26.8
Majority		711	33.5	+13.1
Turnout		2,123	54.3	
Conservative hold		Swing		

Heage and Ambergate (2)
Party	Candidate	Votes	%	±%
Labour	Maurice Gent	1,017		
Conservative	Angela Ward	933		
Labour	Christine Worth	763		
Conservative	Matthew Joyes	716		
Liberal Democrats	Keith Falconbridge	114		
Turnout		3,543	50.6	+13.8
Labour gain from Conservative		Swing		
Conservative hold		Swing		

Kilburn, Denby and Holbrook
Party	Candidate	Votes	%	±%
Conservative	Mel Hall	1,504	53.0	+4.4
Labour	John Banks	1,120	39.5	+8.2
BNP	Amy Purdy	215	7.6	+7.6
Majority		384	13.5	−3.8
Turnout		2,839	45.9	
Conservative hold		Swing		

Ripley
Party	Candidate	Votes	%	±%
Conservative	Stuart Joynes	1,248	43.8	+4.4
Labour	Tony Holmes	1,234	43.3	+6.5
BNP	Alan Edwards	210	7.4	−2.3
Liberal Democrats	Paul Gibbons	158	5.5	−8.6
Majority		14	0.5	−2.1
Turnout		2,850	40.5	
Conservative hold		Swing		

Ripley and Marehay
Party	Candidate	Votes	%	±%
Labour	Lyndsay Cox	946	47.3	+18.6
Conservative	Liam Rhodes	757	37.8	−11.5
BNP	Kenneth Cooper	170	8.5	−13.5
Liberal Democrats	Michael Bedford	128	6.4	+6.4
Majority		189	9.5	
Turnout		2,001	43.2	+7.1
Labour hold		Swing		

Shipley Park, Horsley and Horsley Woodhouse
Party	Candidate	Votes	%	±%
Conservative	Alex Stevenson	1,144	50.2	+5.5
Labour	Eric Lancashire	959	42.1	+8.7
Liberal Democrats	Kate Smith	176	7.7	−14.2
Majority		185	8.1	−3.3
Turnout		2,279	49.4	
Conservative hold		Swing		

South West Parishes
Party	Candidate	Votes	%	±%
Conservative	Jane Orton	unopposed		
Conservative hold		Swing		

Swanwick
Party	Candidate	Votes	%	±%
Conservative	Steve Hayes	903	43.4	−7.0
Independent	George Soudah	593	28.5	+28.5
Labour	Emma Sowter	523	25.1	−5.7
BNP	Maria Riley-Ward	63	3.0	+3.0
Majority		310	14.9	−4.7
Turnout		2,082	48.8	
Conservative hold		Swing		

Wingfield
Party	Candidate	Votes	%	±%
Conservative	Valerie Thorpe	761	70.3	−9.5
Labour	Geoffrey Johnston	261	24.1	+10.9
Liberal Democrats	Ollie Smith	61	5.6	−1.4
Majority		500	46.2	−20.4
Turnout		1,083	58.4	+8.9
Conservative hold		Swing		
