= 2019 Amber Valley Borough Council election =

2019 UK local government election

2019 Amber Valley Borough Council Election
- 2 May 2019

15 of 45 seats for Amber Valley Borough Council 23 seats needed for a majority
	First party	Second party	Third party
Party	Labour	Conservative	Green
Last election	20	25	1
Seats won	6	8	1
Seats after	25	19	1
Seat change	▲5	▼6	▲1
Popular vote	7,616	9,322	3,689
Percentage	31.1%	38.0%	15.0%
- Map of wards showing results of the 2019 Amber Valley Borough Council election

Elections to Amber Valley Borough Council in Derbyshire, England took place on Thursday 2 May 2019. One third of the council seats were up for election. The Labour Party gained overall control of the council, taking a total of five seats from the Conservatives. In addition, the Green Party gained representation for the first time. After the election, the composition of the council was:-

- Labour 25
- Conservative 19
- Green 1

== Election result ==
Amber Valley Local election result 2019
Party	Seats	Gains	Losses	Net gain/loss	Seats %	Votes %	Votes	+/−
Conservative	8	0	6	-6	53.3	38.0	9,322	▼9.7
Labour	6	5	0	+5	40.0	31.1	7,616	▲1.2
Green	1	1	0	+1	6.6	15.0	3,689	▲7.0
Liberal Democrats	0	0	0	0	0.0	8.2	2,010	▲5.6
UKIP	0	0	0	0	0.0	5.6	1,363	▼5.9
Independent	0	0	0	0	0.0	1.9	460	▲0.9
English Democrat	0	0	0	0	0.0	0.2	65	New

== Ward results ==
Percentage change in party votes are from wards contested during the previous election cycle, which was 2015. Percentages might not add up to 100 percent due to rounding.

=== Alfreton ===
Alfreton (1 Seat)
Party	Candidate	Votes	%	±%
Labour	Gail Dolman	675	40.8	−4.9
Conservative	Ben Slade	421	25.4	−2.2
UKIP	Phil Rose	385	23.3	+3.1
Green	Leo Swarvett	112	6.8	+3.6
Liberal Democrats	George William	62	3.8	+0.4
Majority		254		
Turnout			26	
Labour hold		Swing		

=== Alport ===
Alport (1 Seat)
Party	Candidate	Votes	%	±%
Conservative	David Taylor	584	56.6	−11.2
Green	Will MacFarlane	165	16.0	+3.3
Labour	Carol Anthony	153	14.8	−4.6
Liberal Democrats	Ade Smith	129	12.5	New
Majority		419		
Turnout			49	
Conservative hold		Swing		

=== Belper Central ===
Candidate Neil Ploughman was suspended by the Labour Party when alleged antisemitic Facebook posts were discovered; however, he remained on the ballot. After being elected, he initially sat as an independent on the authority. He was subsequently reinstated by the party with no charge to answer. He later left the party in 2021 sitting as a 'socialist'.

Belper Central (1 Seat)
Party	Candidate	Votes	%	±%
Labour	Neil Ploughman	743	41.3	+9.9
Conservative	James Kerry	559	31.0	−11.8
Green	Steve Kennedy	353	19.6	+6.7
Liberal Democrats	Jeremy Benson	146	8.1	+8.1
Majority		184		
Turnout			41	
Labour gain from Conservative		Swing		

=== Belper East ===
Belper East (1 Seat)
Party	Candidate	Votes	%	±%
Labour	Mark Oldfield	775	42.8	+12.3
Conservative	Valerie Taylor	538	29.7	−17.4
Liberal Democrats	John Morrissey	499	27.6	New
Majority		237		
Turnout			39	
Labour gain from Conservative		Swing		

=== Belper North ===
Belper North (1 Seat)
Party	Candidate	Votes	%	±%
Labour	Emma Monkman	814	41.8	+16.7
Conservative	John Nelson	591	30.3	−11.7
Green	Sue MacFarlane	276	14.2	−3.4
UKIP	Mervyn Jackson	163	8.4	−6.9
Liberal Democrats	Roger Shelley	104	5.3	New
Majority		223		
Turnout			49	
Labour gain from Conservative		Swing		

=== Belper South ===
Belper South (1 Seat)
Party	Candidate	Votes	%	±%
Labour	John Porter	676	39.5	+9.4
Conservative	Paul Hillier	554	32.4	−8.4
Green	James Brooks	369	21.6	+7.5
Liberal Democrats	Richard Salmon	111	6.5	New
Majority		122		
Turnout			39	
Labour gain from Conservative		Swing		

=== Crich ===
Crich (1 Seat)
Party	Candidate	Votes	%	±%
Conservative	Gareth Gee	351	40.0	−12.3
Liberal Democrats	Kate Smith	218	24.9	+12.8
Labour	Joel Bryan	180	20.5	−7.8
Green	Julie Wozniczka	128	14.6	+7.3
Majority		133		
Turnout			42	
Conservative hold		Swing		

=== Duffield ===
Duffield (1 Seat)
Party	Candidate	Votes	%	±%
Green	Dave Wells	1,394	62.9	+53.7
Conservative	Steven Evanson	603	27.2	−36.4
Labour Co-op	James Butler	148	6.7	−12.7
UKIP	Geoffrey Aldwinckle	67	3.3	New
Majority		791		
Turnout			55	
Green gain from Conservative		Swing		

=== Heage and Ambergate ===
Heage and Ambergate (1 Seat)
Party	Candidate	Votes	%	±%
Labour	Paul Lobley	731	43.2	+8.6
Conservative	Matt Murray	615	36.4	−5.8
Green	Sarah Johnson	260	15.4	+9.9
Liberal Democrats	Simon Mallard	85	5.0	+3.0
Majority		116		
Turnout			42	
Labour gain from Conservative		Swing		

=== Kilburn, Denby and Holbrook ===
Kilburn, Denby and Holbrook (1 Seat)
Party	Candidate	Votes	%	±%
Conservative	Kevin Buttery	1,034	42.5	−7.2
Labour	Keith Venables	583	30.4	+3.2
UKIP	Adrian Nathan	281	11.6	−3.4
Green	Joe Smith	261	10.7	+6.2
Liberal Democrats	Phillip Mackin	117	4.8	+1.2
Majority		451		
Turnout			39	
Conservative hold		Swing		

=== Ripley ===
Ripley (1 Seat)
Party	Candidate	Votes	%	±%
Conservative	Paul Moss	861	37.4	−3.2
Labour	Steve Freeborn	842	36.6	+1.8
UKIP	Mandy Sylvan	304	13.2	−4.7
Green	Tom Carter	203	8.8	+5.2
Liberal Democrats	Richard Smeeton	94	4.1	+1.0
Majority		19		
Turnout			32	
Conservative hold		Swing		

=== Ripley and Marehay ===
Ripley and Marehay (1 Seat)
Party	Candidate	Votes	%	±%
Conservative	Ronald Ashton	618	39.9	−2.6
Labour	Ian Fisher	587	37.7	+1.4
UKIP	Tim Ford	158	10.2	−5.5
Liberal Democrats	Chris Oakley	104	6.7	+4.3
English Democrat	Michael Sharp	65	5.5	New
Majority		31		
Turnout			34	
Conservative hold		Swing		

=== South West Parishes ===
South West Parishes (1 Seat)
Party	Candidate	Votes	%	±%
Conservative	Jane Orton	740	67.8	−10.4
Liberal Democrats	Colin Thompson	206	18.9	New
Labour	David Farrelly	146	13.4	New
Majority		534		
Turnout			37	
Conservative hold		Swing		

=== Swanwick ===
Swanwick (1 Seat)
Party	Candidate	Votes	%	±%
Conservative	Steve Hayes	651	42.0	−10.3
Independent	George Soudah	460	29.7	+16.0
Labour	Antony Tester	240	15.5	−12.1
Green	Steve Elliott	102	6.6	+2.7
Liberal Democrats	Malvin Trigg	96	6.2	+3.7
Majority		191		
Turnout			35	
Conservative hold		Swing		

=== Wingfield ===
Wingfield (1 seat)
Party	Candidate	Votes	%	±%
Conservative	Valerie Thorpe	602	68.8	+4.0
Labour	David Williams	168	19.2	−2.1
Green	Mike Jones	66	7.5	+4.0
Liberal Democrats	Jeremy Miles	39	4.5	+1.7
Majority		434	49.6	
Turnout		875	46	
Conservative hold		Swing		
