= 2015 Amber Valley Borough Council election =

2015 UK local government election

2015 local election results in Amber Valley

The 2015 Amber Valley Borough Council election took place on 7 May 2015 to elect members of Amber Valley Borough Council in England. This was on the same day as other local elections. The Conservatives gained two seats and thereby retook control of the council.

After the election the composition of the council was:

- Conservative 24
- Labour 21

== Election result ==
Amber Valley local election result 2015
| Party | Seats | Gains | Losses | Net gain/loss | Seats % | Votes % | Votes | +/− |
|---|---|---|---|---|---|---|---|---|
| Conservative | 14 | 2 | 0 | +2 | 93 | 47.7 | 20605 | |
| Labour | 1 | 0 | 2 | -2 | 7 | 29.2 | 12627 | |
| UKIP | 0 | 0 | 0 | 0 | 0 | 11.5 | 4979 | |
| Green | 0 | 0 | 0 | 0 | 0 | 8.0 | 3456 | |
| Liberal Democrats | 0 | 0 | 0 | 0 | 0 | 2.6 | 1118 | |
| Independent | 0 | 0 | 0 | 0 | 0 | 1.0 | 439 | |

== Ward results ==
Percentage change in party votes are from the last time the ward was contested. This may have been 2011, 2013 or 2014.

Alfreton
| Party | Candidate | Votes | % | ±% |
|---|---|---|---|---|
| Labour | Gail Dolman | 1626 | 45.6 | −9.0 |
| Conservative | Kat Moss | 985 | 27.6 | +12.8 |
| UKIP | Anthony Spencer | 718 | 20.2 | −7.9 |
| Liberal Democrats | Ruth Thornton | 121 | 3.4 | +1.0 |
| Green | Chris Parker | 113 | 3.2 | +3.2 |
| Majority | | 641 | 18.0 | |
| Turnout | | 3563 | 57.6 | |
| Labour hold | | Swing | | |

Alport
| Party | Candidate | Votes | % | ±% |
|---|---|---|---|---|
| Conservative | David Taylor | 1126 | 67.8 | −2.5 |
| Labour | Phil Whitney | 323 | 19.5 | −10.2 |
| Green | Steve Kennedy | 211 | 12.7 | +12.7 |
| Majority | | 803 | 48.3 | |
| Turnout | | 1660 | 76.9 | |
| Conservative hold | | Swing | | |

Belper Central
| Party | Candidate | Votes | % | ±% |
|---|---|---|---|---|
| Conservative | Dan Booth | 1320 | 42.8 | +0.6 |
| Labour | Dick Watson | 965 | 31.3 | +1.0 |
| UKIP | David Fisher | 400 | 13.0 | +13.0 |
| Green | Dave Wells | 396 | 12.9 | −9.2 |
| Majority | | 355 | 11.5 | |
| Turnout | | 3081 | 68.5 | |
| Conservative hold | | Swing | | |

Belper East
| Party | Candidate | Votes | % | ±% |
|---|---|---|---|---|
| Conservative | Jackie Cox | 1515 | 47.1 | +8.9 |
| Labour | Ben Bellamy | 980 | 30.5 | −4.4 |
| UKIP | Roy Snape | 491 | 15.3 | −7.2 |
| Green | John Devine | 230 | 7.2 | +7.2 |
| Majority | | 535 | 16.6 | |
| Turnout | | 3216 | 67.2 | |
| Conservative hold | | Swing | | |

Belper North
| Party | Candidate | Votes | % | ±% |
|---|---|---|---|---|
| Conservative | Joseph Booth | 1229 | 42.0 | −2.1 |
| Labour | Steve Holden | 733 | 25.1 | −14.3 |
| Green | Sue MacFarlane | 515 | 17.6 | +17.6 |
| UKIP | Ashley Harrison | 447 | 15.3 | +15.3 |
| Majority | | 496 | 16.9 | |
| Turnout | | 2924 | 72.9 | |
| Conservative hold | | Swing | | |

Belper South
| Party | Candidate | Votes | % | ±% |
|---|---|---|---|---|
| Conservative | Paul Hillier | 1214 | 40.8 | +10.2 |
| Labour | Alan Broughton | 898 | 30.2 | −7.2 |
| UKIP | Ashleigh Lloyd-Selby | 445 | 15.0 | −11.5 |
| Green | Sue Devine | 419 | 14.1 | +14.1 |
| Majority | | 316 | 10.6 | |
| Turnout | | 2976 | 65.5 | |
| Conservative hold | | Swing | | |

Crich
| Party | Candidate | Votes | % | ±% |
|---|---|---|---|---|
| Conservative | Gareth Gee | 784 | 52.3 | +1.7 |
| Labour | Ro MacKenzie | 425 | 28.4 | +0.8 |
| Liberal Democrats | Kate Smith | 180 | 12.0 | −9.8 |
| Green | Julie Wozniczka | 109 | 7.3 | +7.3 |
| Majority | | 359 | 23.9 | |
| Turnout | | 1498 | 74.8 | |
| Conservative hold | | Swing | | |

Duffield
| Party | Candidate | Votes | % | ±% |
|---|---|---|---|---|
| Conservative | Steven Evanson | 1901 | 63.6 | +12.4 |
| Labour | Carol Angharad | 581 | 19.4 | −4.0 |
| Green | Kate Howard | 273 | 9.1 | +9.1 |
| Liberal Democrats | Richard Salmon | 234 | 7.8 | −1.2 |
| Majority | | 1320 | 44.2 | |
| Turnout | | 2989 | 74.5 | |
| Conservative hold | | Swing | | |

Heage and Ambergate
| Party | Candidate | Votes | % | ±% |
|---|---|---|---|---|
| Conservative | Valerie Taylor | 1264 | 42.2 | +9.9 |
| Labour | David Farrelly | 1038 | 34.7 | −7.6 |
| UKIP | Mitch Blakeman | 440 | 14.7 | −6.7 |
| Green | Sandy Devine | 163 | 5.4 | +5.4 |
| Liberal Democrats | Audrey Wootton | 90 | 3.0 | −1.1 |
| Majority | | 226 | 7.5 | |
| Turnout | | 2995 | 74.1 | |
| Conservative gain from Labour | | Swing | | |

Kilburn, Denby and Holbrook
| Party | Candidate | Votes | % | ±% |
|---|---|---|---|---|
| Conservative | Kevin Buttery | 2212 | 49.7 | +8.9 |
| Labour | John Banks | 1210 | 27.2 | −2.8 |
| UKIP | Adrian Nathan | 664 | 14.9 | −10.4 |
| Green | Lian Pizzey | 203 | 4.6 | +4.6 |
| Liberal Democrats | Ron Welsby | 163 | 3.7 | −0.3 |
| Majority | | 1002 | 22.5 | |
| Turnout | | 4452 | 70.1 | |
| Conservative hold | | Swing | | |

Ripley
| Party | Candidate | Votes | % | ±% |
|---|---|---|---|---|
| Conservative | Colin Moss | 1836 | 40.6 | +9.5 |
| Labour | Antony Tester | 1572 | 34.7 | −3.1 |
| UKIP | Paula Parkin | 811 | 17.9 | −6.4 |
| Green | Tony Youens | 165 | 3.6 | +3.6 |
| Liberal Democrats | Peter Jelf | 140 | 3.1 | +0.3 |
| Majority | | 264 | 5.9 | |
| Turnout | | 4524 | 64.4 | |
| Conservative hold | | Swing | | |

Ripley and Marehay
| Party | Candidate | Votes | % | ±% |
|---|---|---|---|---|
| Conservative | Ronald Aston | 1273 | 42.5 | +6.0 |
| Labour | Lyndsay Cox | 1089 | 36.3 | −14.7 |
| UKIP | Garry Smith | 454 | 15.2 | +15.2 |
| Green | Phil Taylor | 109 | 3.6 | +3.6 |
| Liberal Democrats | Fay Whitehead | 71 | 2.4 | −2.0 |
| Majority | | 184 | 6.2 | N/A |
| Turnout | | 2996 | 66.0 | |
| Conservative gain from Labour | | Swing | | |

South West Parishes
| Party | Candidate | Votes | % | ±% |
|---|---|---|---|---|
| Conservative | Kathryn Jane Orton | 1347 | 78.1 | |
| Green | Matt McGuinness | 377 | 21.9 | |
| Majority | | 970 | 55.2 | |
| Turnout | | 1724 | 76.2 | |
| Conservative hold | | Swing | | |

Swanwick
| Party | Candidate | Votes | % | ±% |
|---|---|---|---|---|
| Conservative | Steve Hayes | 1679 | 52.4 | +16.0 |
| Labour | Timothy Benson | 885 | 27.6 | +4.7 |
| Independent | George Soudah | 439 | 13.7 | −5.7 |
| Green | Jackie Blackett | 124 | 3.9 | +3.9 |
| Liberal Democrats | Margaret Tomkins | 79 | 2.5 | 0.0 |
| Majority | | 796 | 24.8 | |
| Turnout | | 3206 | 73.6 | |
| Conservative hold | | Swing | | |

Wingfield
| Party | Candidate | Votes | % | ±% |
|---|---|---|---|---|
| Conservative | Valerie Thorpe | 920 | 64.8 | −5.5 |
| Labour | Geoffrey Johnston | 302 | 21.3 | −2.8 |
| UKIP | Ann Fox | 109 | 7.7 | +7.7 |
| Green | Mike Jones | 49 | 3.5 | +3.5 |
| Liberal Democrats | Ollie Smith | 40 | 2.8 | −2.8 |
| Majority | | 618 | 43.5 | |
| Turnout | | 1420 | 76.0 | |
| Conservative hold | | Swing | | |
