= 2018 Amber Valley Borough Council election =

2018 UK local government election

2018 Amber Valley Borough Council Election
- 3 May 2018

15 of 45 seats for Amber Valley Borough Council 23 seats needed for a majority
	First party	Second party
Party	Conservative	Labour
Last election	23	22
Seats won	7	8
Seats after	25	20
Seat change	▲2	▼2
Popular vote	11,723	9,322
Percentage	47.2%	41.9%
- Map of the results of the 2018 Amber Valley Borough council election. Labour in red and Conservatives in blue. Wards in grey were not contested in 2018.

The Conservatives gained seats to strengthen their position controlling the council. After the election, the composition of the council was:-

- Conservative 25
- Labour 20

== Election result ==
Amber Valley election result 2018
Party	Seats	Gains	Losses	Net gain/loss	Seats %	Votes %	Votes	+/−
Conservative	7	+3	-1	+2	46.7%	47.2%	11723	
Labour	8	+1	-3	-2	53.3%	41.9%	10417	
Green	0	0	0	0	0%	5.8%	1440	
Liberal Democrats	0	0	0	0	0%	4.8%	1182	
Independent	0	0	0	0	0%	0.3%	71	
National Front	0	0	0	0	0%	0.1%	30	

== Ward results ==
Percentage change in party votes are from the last time the ward was contested. This is either 2015 or 2016.

=== Alfreton ===
Alfreton (1 Seat)
Party	Candidate	Votes	%	±%
Labour	John Walker	993	59.7	+6.1
Conservative	Colin Boyce	555	33.2	+13.7
Green	Leo Swarvett	75	4.5	+1.6
Liberal Democrats	Kate Smith	49	2.9	−2.0
Majority		438	26.5	
Turnout		1672	27.2	
Labour hold		Swing		

=== Belper East ===
Belper East (1 Seat)
Party	Candidate	Votes	%	±%
Labour	Fay Atkinson	812	44.9	+14.4
Conservative	Martin Tomlinson	753	41.6	−5.5
Liberal Democrats	Adam Raphael	164	9.1	+9.1
Green	Julie Wozniczka	79	4.4	−2.8
Majority		59	3.3	
Turnout		1808	38.0	
Labour gain from Conservative		Swing		

=== Belper South ===
Belper South (1 Seat)
Party	Candidate	Votes	%	±%
Labour	Carol Angharad	811	47.7	+17.5
Conservative	Timothy Sutton	629	37.0	−3.8
Green	Sue MacFarlane	130	7.6	−6.5
Independent	Steven White	71	4.2	+4.2
Liberal Democrats	Richard Salmon	60	3.5	+3.5
Majority		182	10.7	
Turnout		1701	38.2	
Labour hold		Swing		

=== Codnor and Waingroves ===
Codnor and Waingroves (1 Seat)
Party	Candidate	Votes	%	±%
Labour	Isobel Harry	689	51.2	−2.2
Conservative	Matthew Murray	615	45.7	+20.1
Liberal Democrats	Jeremy Miles	43	3.2	+1.6
Majority		74	5.5	
Turnout		1347	34.7	
Labour hold		Swing		

=== Duffield ===
Duffield (1 Seat)
Party	Candidate	Votes	%	±%
Conservative	Chris Short	898	48.0	−15.6
Green	Dave Wells	637	34.1	+25.0
Labour	Patrick Mountain	225	12.0	−7.4
Liberal Democrats	Andrea Nove	110	5.9	−1.9
Majority		262	13.9	
Turnout		1870	46.4	
Conservative hold		Swing		

=== Heanor and Loscoe ===
Heanor and Loscoe (1 Seat)
Party	Candidate	Votes	%	±%
Labour	Hannah Stirland	654	48.0	+7.9
Conservative	Sue Iliffe	620	45.6	+19.7
Green	James Brooks	60	4.4	+1.3
Liberal Democrats	John Morrissey	29	2.1	−0.6
Majority		34	2.4	
Turnout		1363	33.6	
Labour hold		Swing		

=== Heanor East ===
Heanor East (1 Seat)
Party	Candidate	Votes	%	±%
Conservative	Henry Thompson	669	49.8	+19.5
Labour	Frank Carmichael	583	43.4	+5.2
Liberal Democrats	Jerry Marler	92	6.8	+3.8
Majority		86	6.4	
Turnout		1344	29.9	
Conservative gain from Labour		Swing		

=== Heanor West ===
Heanor West (1 Seat)
Party	Candidate	Votes	%	±%
Conservative	Steven Grainger	698	46.7	+18.3
Labour	Paul Jones	670	44.8	+2.6
Green	Lian Pizzey	78	5.2	+2.5
Liberal Democrats	Chris Oakley	49	3.3	+0.3
Majority		28	1.9	
Turnout		1495	31.7	
Conservative gain from Labour		Swing		

=== Ironville and Riddings ===
Ironville and Riddings (1 Seat)
Party	Candidate	Votes	%	±%
Labour	Paul Smith	917	54.4	+14.6
Conservative	Pete Clark	703	41.7	+1.0
Liberal Democrats	George Turner	66	3.9	+2.0
Majority		214	12.7	
Turnout		1686	37.4	
Labour hold		Swing		

=== Kilburn, Denby and Holbrook ===
Kilburn, Denby and Holbrook (1 Seat)
Party	Candidate	Votes	%	±%
Conservative	Trevor Ainsworth	1,345	57.4	+6.9
Labour	Sam Hart	785	33.5	+3.3
Liberal Democrats	Susan Allen	113	4.8	+0.9
Green	Steve Kennedy	99	4.2	−0.3
Majority		560	23.9	
Turnout		2342	36.8	
Conservative hold		Swing		

=== Langley Mill and Aldercar ===
Langley Mill and Aldercar (1 Seat)
Party	Candidate	Votes	%	±%
Labour	Eileen Hamilton	535	48.7	+5.2
Conservative	Victoria Stevenson	488	44.4	+11.9
Liberal Democrats	Joanna Jones	45	4.1	+2.8
National Front	Timothy Knowles	30	2.7	+1.4
Majority		47	4.3	
Turnout		1098	27.1	
Labour hold		Swing		

=== Ripley ===
Ripley (1 Seat)
Party	Candidate	Votes	%	±%
Conservative	Sean Carter	1,207	49.6	+10.6
Labour	Roland Emmas-Williams	1061	43.6	+3.5
Liberal Democrats	Richard Smeeton	89	3.7	+1.7
Green	Will MacFarlane	75	3.1	+0.6
Majority		146	6.0	
Turnout		2432	34.2	
Conservative gain from Labour		Swing		

=== Shipley Park, Horsley and Horsley Woodhouse ===
Shipley Park, Horsley and Horsley Woodhouse (1 Seat)
Party	Candidate	Votes	%	±%
Conservative	Richard Iliffe	1,172	64.3	+12.7
Labour	Christine Venables	436	23.9	+1.8
Liberal Democrats	Jacob Holt	117	6.4	+3.3
Green	Tina Pritchard	97	5.3	+1.6
Majority		736	40.4	
Turnout		1822	38.0	
Conservative hold		Swing		

=== Somercotes ===
Somercotes (1 Seat)
Party	Candidate	Votes	%	±%
Labour	Brian Lyttle	789	66.6	+8.2
Conservative	Kathy Moss	358	30.2	+17.1
Liberal Democrats	Colin Thompson	37	3.1	+0.8
Majority		431	36.4	
Turnout		1184	26.5	
Labour hold		Swing		

=== Swanwick ===
Swanwick (1 Seat)
Party	Candidate	Votes	%	±%
Conservative	David Wilson	1,013	59.6	+7.2
Labour	Charlie Robinson	457	26.9	−0.7
Liberal Democrats	Joel Hunt	119	7.0	+5.5
Green	Steve Elliott	110	6.5	+2.6
Majority		556	32.7	
Turnout		1699	39.0	
Conservative hold		Swing		
